= 2016 United States presidential election in Illinois =

- November 8, 2016
- Turnout: 70.56% (▲0.36 pp)
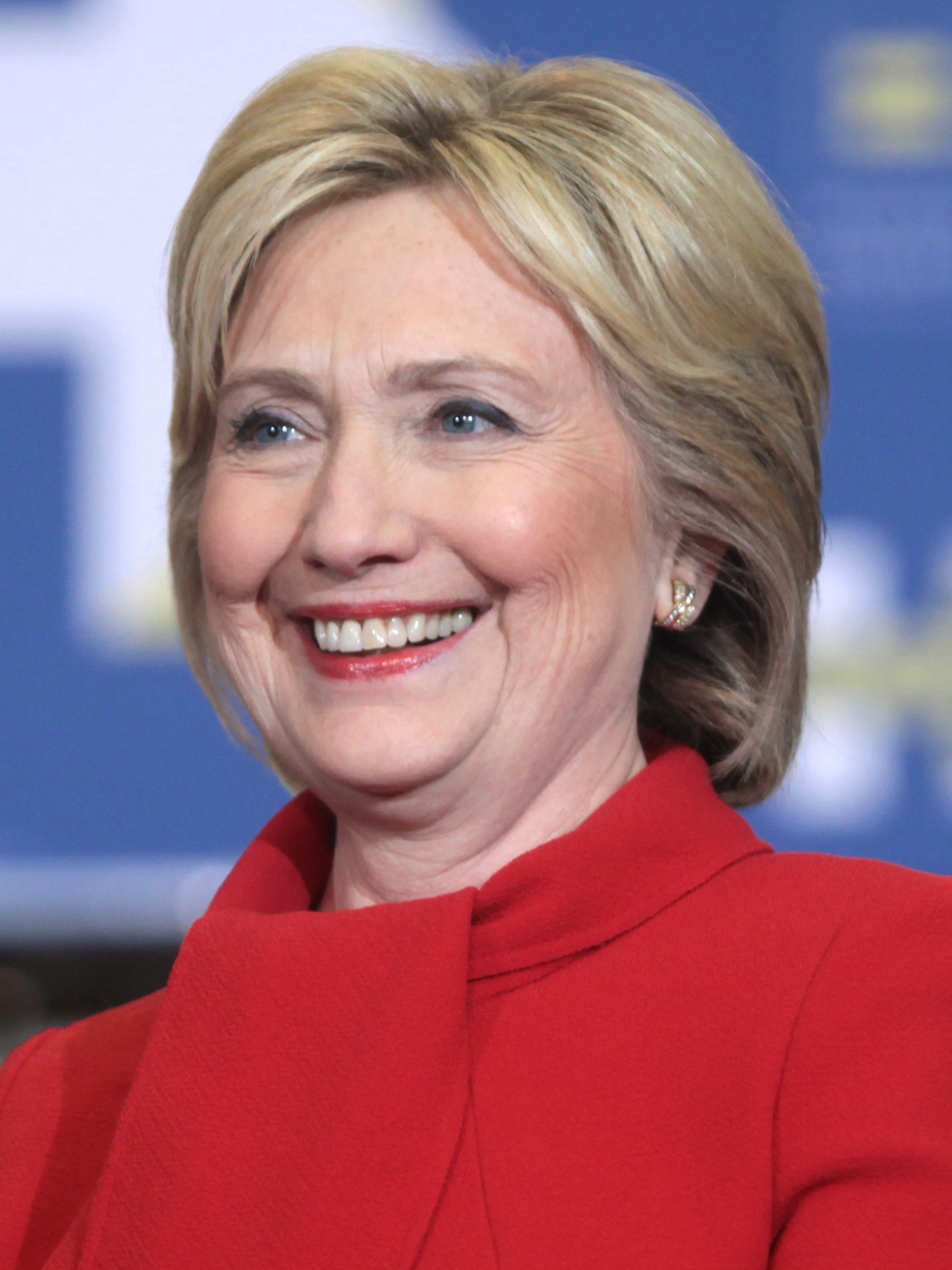

Nominee	Hillary Clinton	Donald Trump
Party	Democratic	Republican
Home state	New York	New York
Running mate	Tim Kaine	Mike Pence
Electoral vote	20	0
Popular vote	3,090,729	2,146,015
Percentage	55.83%	38.76%

Clinton
40–50%
50–60%
60–70%
70–80%
80–90%
90–100%
Trump
40–50%
50–60%
60–70%
70–80%
80–90%
90–100%
Tie/No Data
President before election
Barack Obama
Democratic
Elected President
Donald Trump
Republican

The 2016 United States presidential election in Illinois was held on Tuesday, November 8, 2016, as part of the 2016 United States presidential election in which all 50 states plus the District of Columbia participated. Illinois voters chose electors to represent them in the Electoral College via a popular vote, pitting the Republican Party's nominee, businessman Donald Trump, and running mate Indiana Governor Mike Pence against Democratic Party nominee, former Secretary of State Hillary Clinton, and her running mate Virginia Senator Tim Kaine. Illinois had 20 votes in the Electoral College.

Illinois was won by Clinton, who garnered 55.83% of the votes cast against Trump's 38.76%, thus winning the state by a margin of 17.07%. Prior to the election, news organizations accurately predicted that the state would be carried by Clinton, who was born in Illinois. Clinton won by a slightly wider margin than Barack Obama in 2012 (by 0.2%), making it one of eleven states (and the District of Columbia) in which she outperformed Obama's 2012 margin; however, due to an increase in third-party voting, her overall percentage of the vote was lower than Obama's in both his runs. Trump flipped eleven counties red, although all of them have small populations; the most populous of them, Whiteside County, has under 60,000 residents. He also became the first Republican ever to win the White House without carrying DeKalb, DuPage, Kane, Lake, Will, or Winnebago Counties.

== Primary elections ==
Presidential primary elections for three parties were held in Illinois. From January 25 to February 17, 2016, the Green Party of the United States held primaries and caucuses, as part of the Green Party presidential primaries, to elect delegates representing a candidate at the 2016 Green National Convention. Physician and activist Jill Stein won a landslide of the popular vote, taking almost all of the state's 23 delegates. On March 15, 2016, both the Democratic and Republican parties held primaries in Illinois as part of a five-state contest being held on the day in both the Democratic and Republican presidential primaries. In the Democratic primaries, 156 pledged delegates to the 2016 Democratic National Convention were elected and awarded to candidates proportionally, according to countywide and statewide vote. In the Republican primaries, 69 delegates to the 2016 Republican National Convention were elected and awarded to the first place candidate, according to statewide vote.

=== Democratic primary ===
The 2016 Illinois Democratic presidential primary was held on March 15, 2016, in the U.S. state of Illinois as one of the Democratic Party's state primaries ahead of the 2016 presidential election.

==== Forum ====
March 14, 2016 – Columbus, Ohio, and Springfield, Illinois: The tenth forum was held at 6:00 pm EDT on March 14, 2016, at the campus of Ohio State University in Columbus, Ohio, and at the Old State Capitol State Historic Site (Illinois) in Springfield, Illinois. It aired on MSNBC. The first section of the town hall with Bernie Sanders was moderated by Chuck Todd; the second section of the town hall with Hillary Clinton was moderated by Chris Matthews.

==== Results ====
Six candidates appeared on the Democratic presidential primary ballot:

Illinois Democratic primary, March 15, 2016
Candidate	Popular vote		Estimated delegates		
Candidate	Count	Percentage	Pledged	Unpledged	Total
Hillary Clinton	1,039,555	50.56%	79	24	103
Bernie Sanders	999,494	48.61%	77	1	78
Willie Wilson	6,565	0.32%			
Martin O'Malley (withdrawn)	6,197	0.30%	0	1	1
Lawrence "Larry Joe" Cohen	2,407	0.12%			
Rocky De La Fuente	1,802	0.09%			
Others	27	0.00%			
Uncommitted	—N/a		0	1	1
Total	2,056,047	100%	156	27	183

=== Republican primary ===
2016 Illinois Republican presidential primary
- March 15, 2016
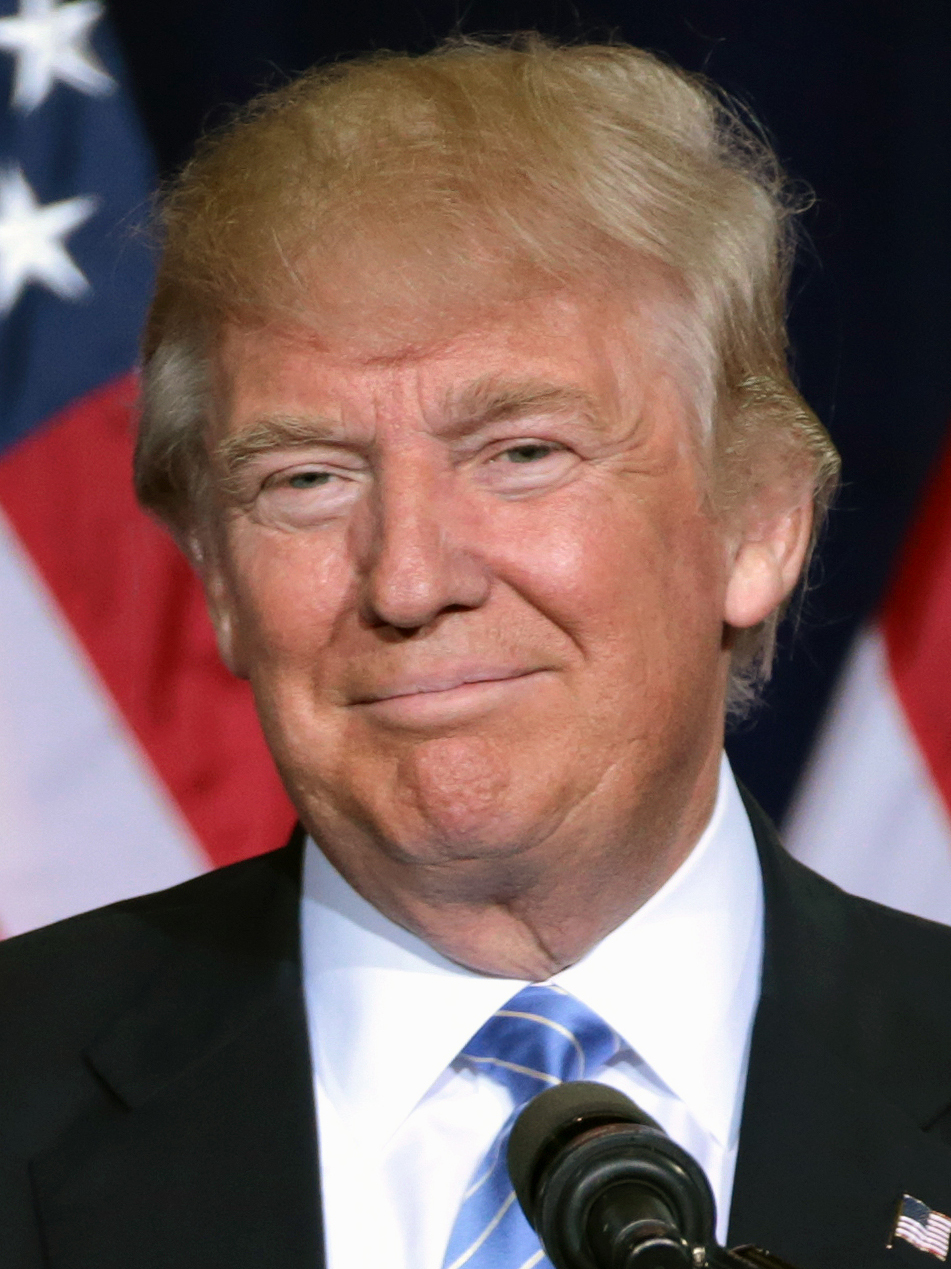

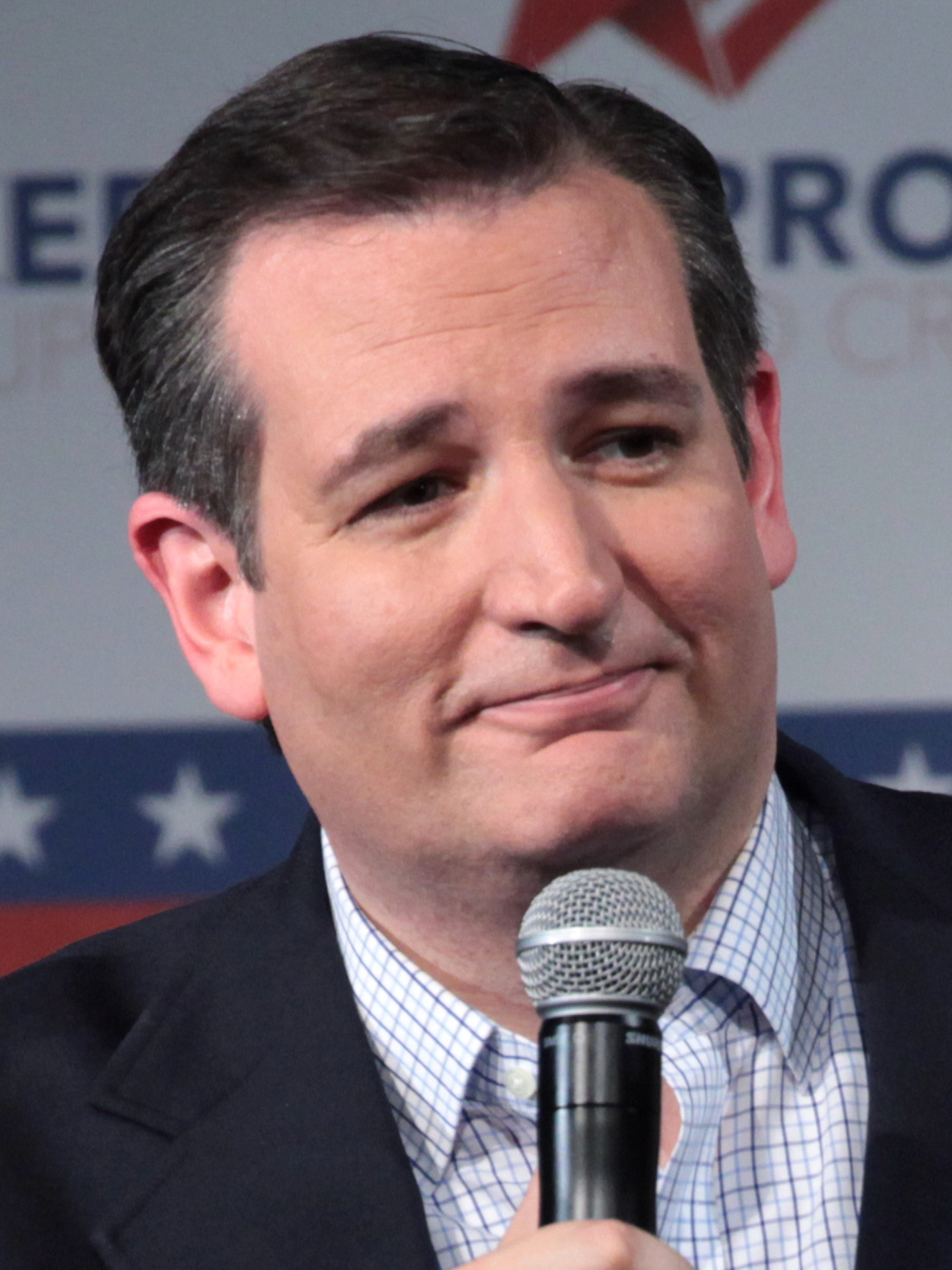

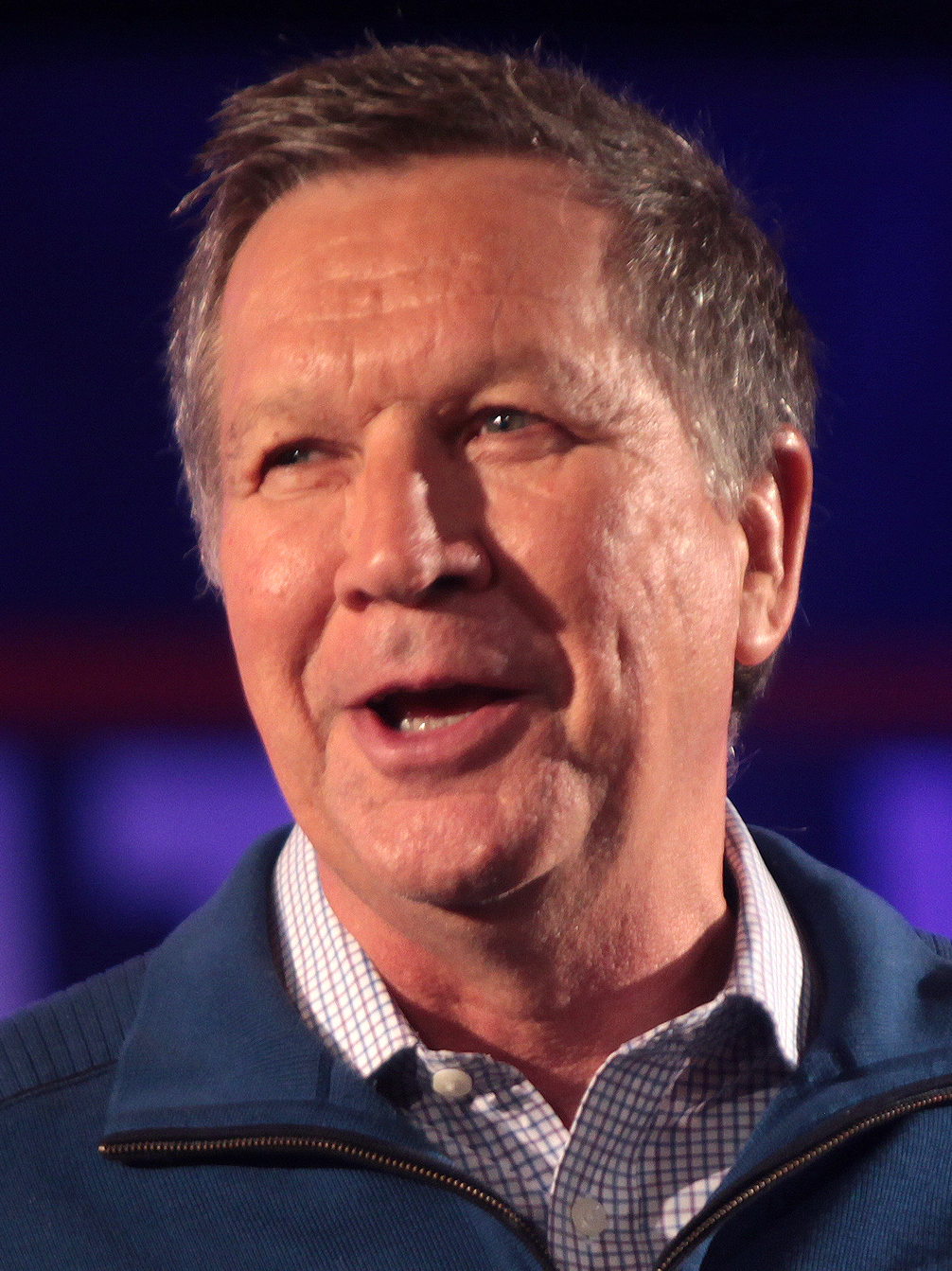

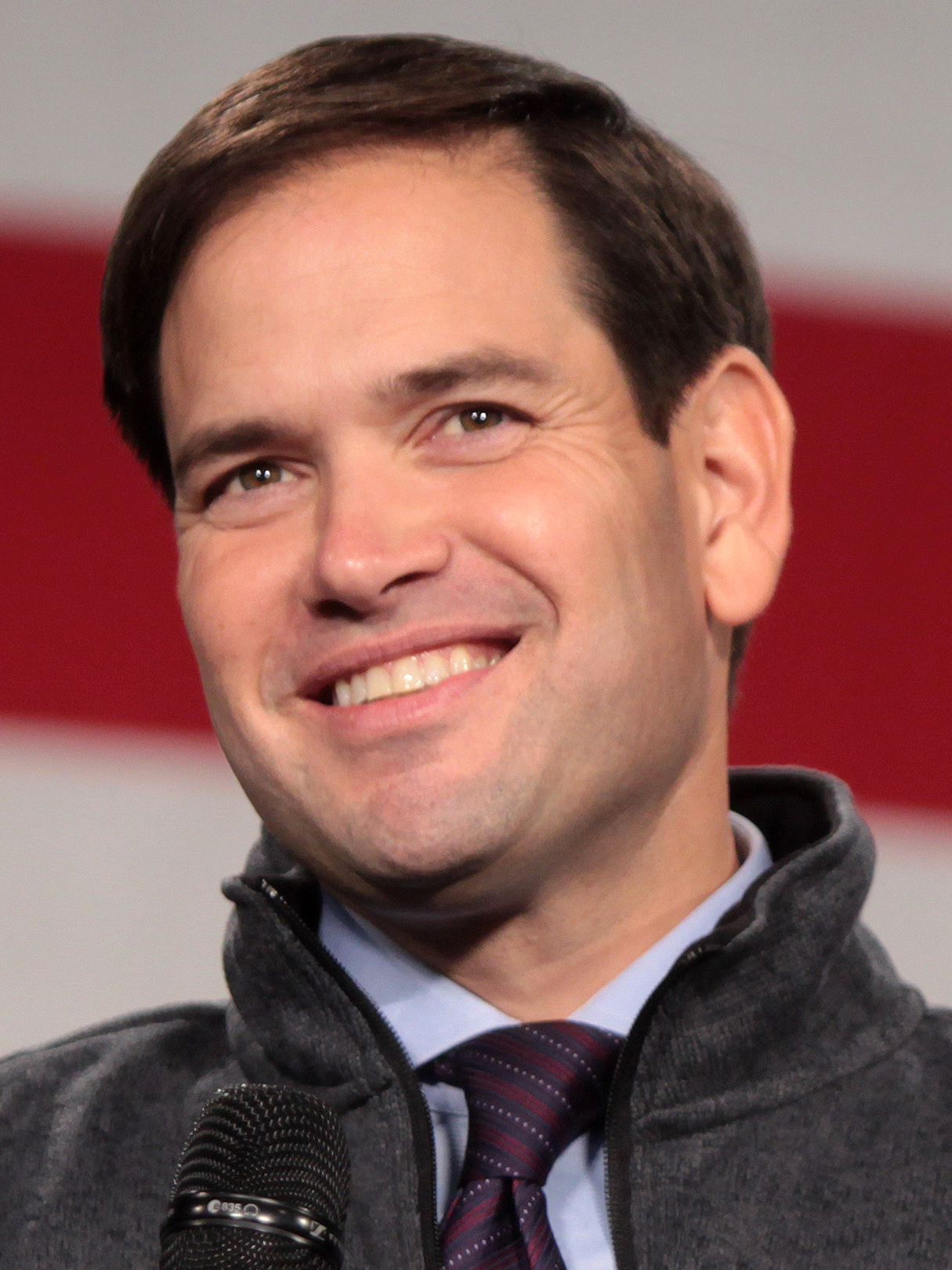
Candidate	Donald Trump	Ted Cruz
Home state	New York	Texas
Delegate count	54	9
Popular vote	562,464	438,235
Percentage	38.80%	30.23%
Candidate	John Kasich	Marco Rubio
Home state	Ohio	Florida
Delegate count	6	0
Popular vote	286,118	126,681
Percentage	19.74%	8.74%
Results by county
Donald Trump 30–40% 40–50% 50–60%	Ted Cruz 30–40% 40–50%

The 2016 Illinois Republican presidential primary was held on March 15, 2016, in the U.S. state of Illinois as one of the Republican Party's state primaries ahead of the 2016 presidential election.

Ten candidates appeared on the Republican presidential primary ballot:

Illinois Republican primary, March 15, 2016
Candidate	Votes	Percentage	Actual delegate count		
Candidate	Votes	Percentage	Bound	Unbound	Total
Donald Trump	562,464	38.80%	54	0	54
Ted Cruz	438,235	30.23%	9	0	9
John Kasich	286,118	19.74%	6	0	6
Marco Rubio	126,681	8.74%	0	0	0
Ben Carson (withdrawn)	11,469	0.79%	0	0	0
Jeb Bush (withdrawn)	11,188	0.77%	0	0	0
Rand Paul (withdrawn)	4,718	0.33%	0	0	0
Chris Christie (withdrawn)	3,428	0.24%	0	0	0
Mike Huckabee (withdrawn)	2,737	0.19%	0	0	0
Carly Fiorina (withdrawn)	1,540	0.11%	0	0	0
Rick Santorum (withdrawn)	1,154	0.08%	0	0	0
Unprojected delegates:			0	0	0
Total:	1,449,748	100.00%	69	0	69
Source: The Green Papers

=== Green primary ===
2016 Illinois Green Party presidential primary
- January 25–February 17, 2016

23 Green National Convention delegates
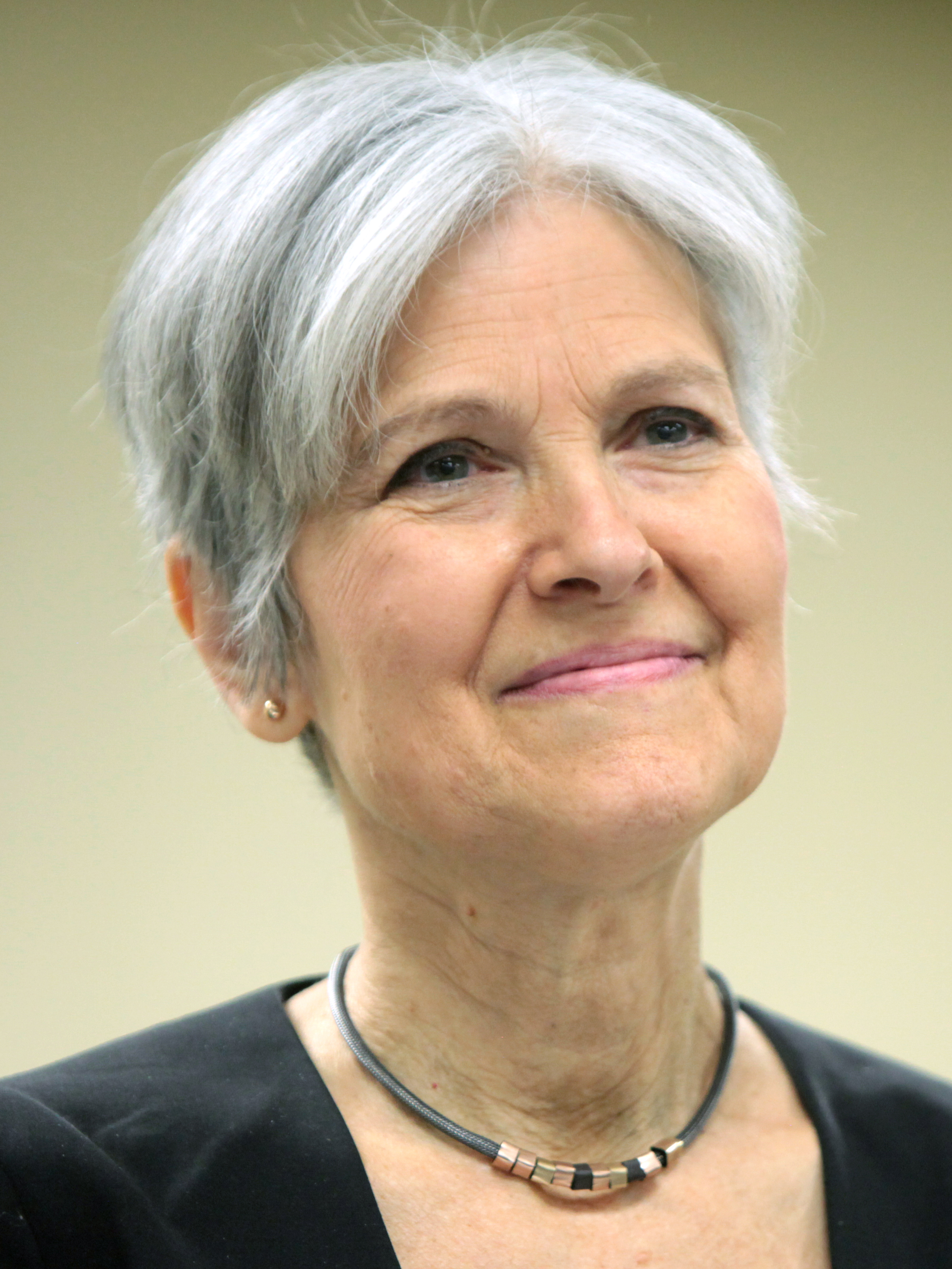

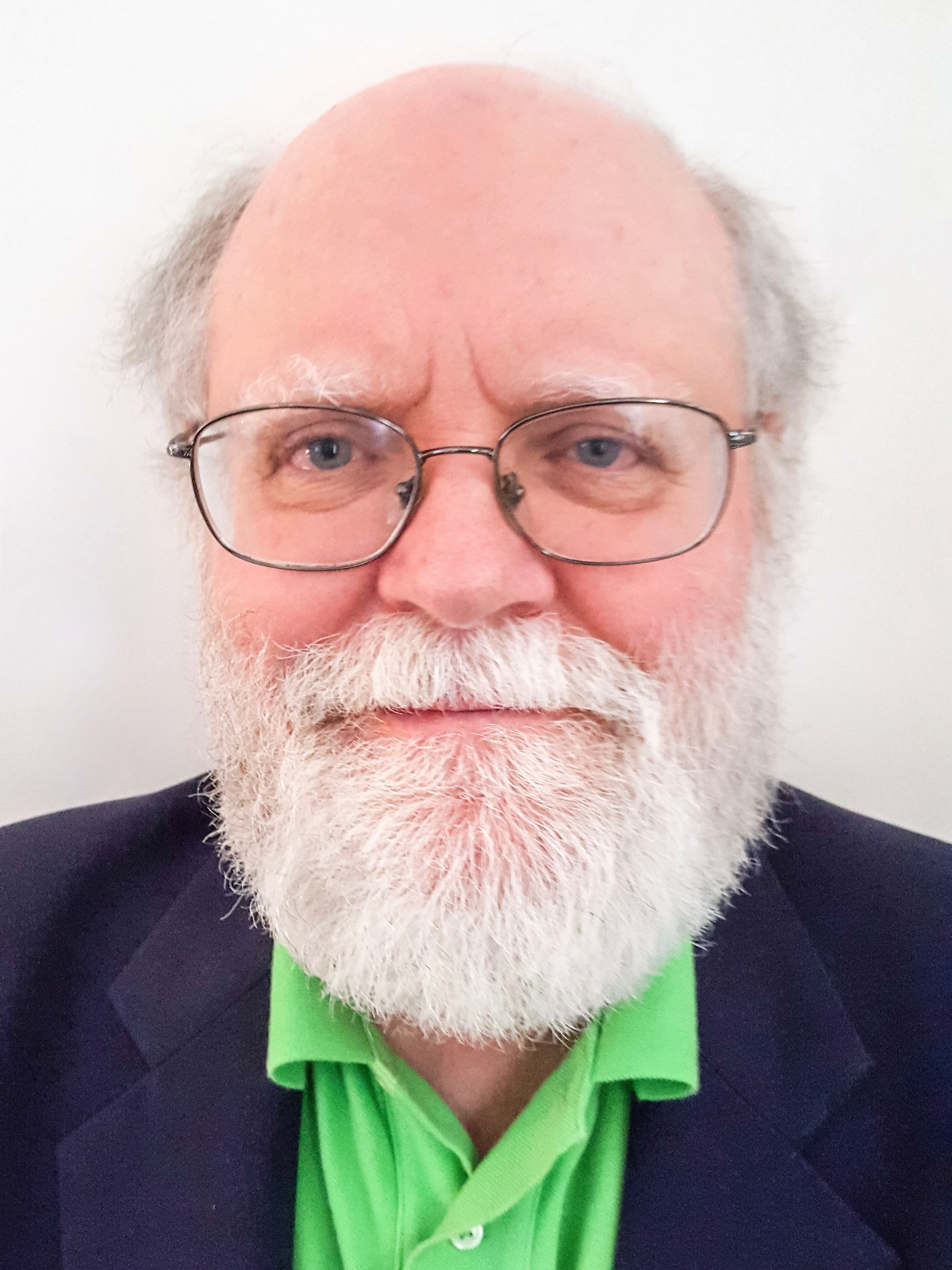
Candidate	Jill Stein	William Kreml
Party	Green	Green
Home state	Massachusetts	South Carolina
Delegate count	20	1
Popular vote	119	5
Percentage	88.81%	3.73%

The 2016 Illinois Green Party presidential primary was held from January 25 through February 17 in the U.S. state of Illinois as one of the Green Party's state primaries ahead of the 2016 presidential election. It was run by the Green Party of Illinois. Illinois' primary was the first to be held of the series of presidential primaries held by the Green Party of the United States. Registered Green party voters could participate in the primary through an online ballot or at select caucus sites in the state on various dates. 23 delegates to the 2016 Green National Convention were up for election in this primary.

Five candidates stood for election, including a sixth "uncommitted" option for the ballot. The candidates included activist and Green nominee in the 2012 presidential election, Jill Stein, singer-songwriter Darryl Cherney, businesswoman Sedinam Moyowasifza-Curry, perennial candidate Kent Mesplay, and professor William "Bill" Kreml. By the end of the primary, 134 votes were cast, with Stein winning a landslide 89% of the vote. 20 delegates from Illinois to the convention were allocated to Stein following the primary, with 1 being allocated to William Kreml and 2 being sent as uncommitted delegates.

Illinois Green Party presidential primary, January 25 - February 17, 2016
Candidate	Votes	Percentage	National delegates
Jill Stein	119	88.81%	20
William Kreml	5	3.73%	1
Kent Mesplay	2	1.49%	0
Sedinam Moyowasifza-Curry	2	1.49%	0
Darryl Cherney	0	0.00%	0
Uncommitted	10	7.46%	2
Total	134	100.00%	23

== General election ==
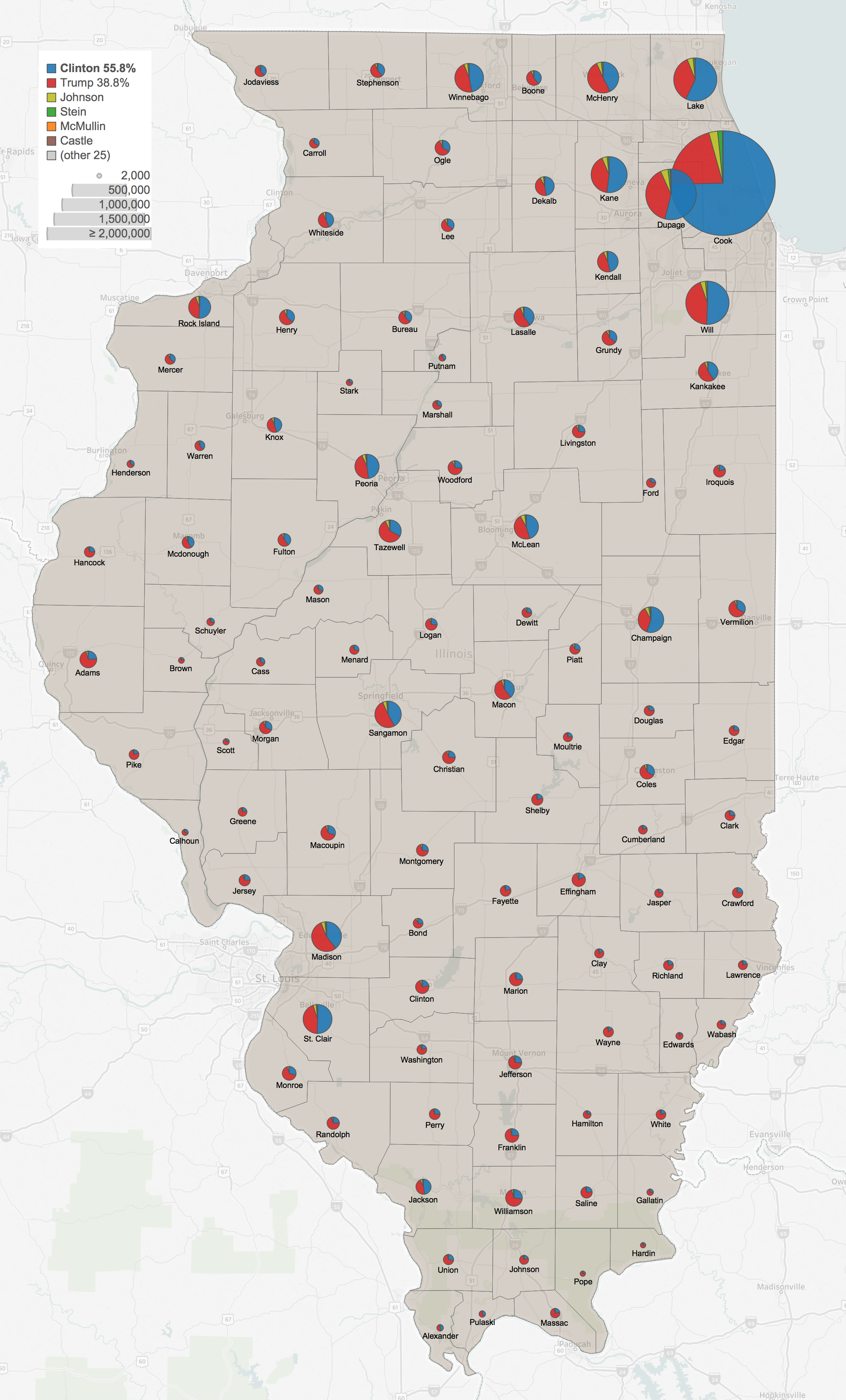
Results by county showing number of votes by size and candidates by color

Treemap of the popular vote by county

=== Predictions ===
Source	Ranking	As of
Los Angeles Times	Safe D	November 6, 2016
CNN	Safe D	November 4, 2016
Cook Political Report	Safe D	November 7, 2016
Electoral-vote.com	Safe D	November 8, 2016
Rothenberg Political Report	Safe D	November 7, 2016
Sabato's Crystal Ball	Safe D	November 7, 2016
RealClearPolitics	Likely D	November 8, 2016
Fox News	Safe D	November 7, 2016

=== Results ===
2016 United States presidential election in Illinois
Party	Candidate	Votes	%
Democratic	Hillary Clinton Tim Kaine	3,090,729	55.83%
Republican	Donald Trump Mike Pence	2,146,015	38.76%
Libertarian	Gary Johnson Bill Weld	209,596	3.79%
Green	Jill Stein Ajamu Baraka	76,802	1.39%
Write-in		13,282	0.23%
Total votes		5,536,424	100.00
Democratic hold			

==== By county ====
Chicago results by community area: Clinton: 40–50%; 50–60%; 60–70%; 70–80%; 80–90%; 90–100%; Trump: 50–60%

County	Hillary Clinton Democratic		Donald Trump Republican		Various candidates Other parties		Margin		Total votes cast
County	#	%	#	%	#	%	#	%	Total votes cast
Adams	7,676	23.76%	22,790	70.54%	1,844	5.70%	−15,114	−46.78%	32,310
Alexander	1,262	44.75%	1,496	53.05%	62	2.20%	−234	−8.30%	2,820
Bond	2,068	27.32%	4,888	64.57%	614	8.11%	−2,820	−37.25%	7,570
Boone	8,986	39.07%	12,282	53.40%	1,733	7.53%	−3,296	−14.33%	23,001
Brown	476	20.01%	1,796	75.49%	107	4.50%	−1,320	−55.48%	2,379
Bureau	6,029	36.38%	9,281	56.01%	1,261	7.61%	−3,252	−19.63%	16,571
Calhoun	739	28.74%	1,721	66.94%	111	4.32%	−982	−38.20%	2,571
Carroll	2,447	32.87%	4,434	59.56%	564	7.57%	−1,987	−26.69%	7,445
Cass	1,621	31.64%	3,216	62.76%	287	5.60%	−1,595	−31.12%	5,124
Champaign	50,137	54.72%	33,368	36.42%	8,123	8.86%	16,769	18.30%	91,628
Christian	3,992	25.79%	10,543	68.12%	942	6.09%	−6,551	−42.33%	15,477
Clark	1,877	23.68%	5,622	70.91%	429	5.41%	−3,745	−47.23%	7,928
Clay	1,020	16.06%	5,021	79.07%	309	4.87%	−4,001	−63.01%	6,350
Clinton	3,945	22.65%	12,412	71.26%	1,062	6.09%	−8,467	−48.61%	17,419
Coles	7,309	33.35%	13,003	59.33%	1,606	7.32%	−5,694	−25.98%	21,918
Cook	1,611,946	73.93%	453,287	20.79%	115,111	5.28%	1,158,659	53.14%	2,180,344
Crawford	1,992	22.79%	6,277	71.83%	470	5.38%	−4,285	−49.04%	8,739
Cumberland	1,031	18.51%	4,206	75.50%	334	5.99%	−3,175	−56.99%	5,571
DeKalb	20,466	46.94%	19,091	43.79%	4,043	9.27%	1,375	3.15%	43,600
DeWitt	1,910	25.28%	5,077	67.19%	569	7.53%	−3,167	−41.91%	7,556
Douglas	1,949	23.78%	5,698	69.53%	548	6.69%	−3,749	−45.75%	8,195
DuPage	228,622	53.08%	166,415	38.64%	35,637	8.28%	62,207	14.44%	430,674
Edgar	1,793	22.70%	5,645	71.46%	461	5.84%	−3,852	−48.76%	7,899
Edwards	434	13.06%	2,778	83.57%	112	3.37%	−2,344	−70.51%	3,324
Effingham	3,083	17.51%	13,635	77.43%	891	5.06%	−10,552	−59.92%	17,609
Fayette	1,819	18.97%	7,372	76.86%	400	4.17%	−5,553	−57.89%	9,591
Ford	1,414	22.11%	4,480	70.04%	502	7.85%	−3,066	−47.93%	6,396
Franklin	4,727	25.26%	13,116	70.10%	868	4.64%	−8,389	−44.84%	18,711
Fulton	6,133	38.82%	8,492	53.76%	1,172	7.42%	−2,359	−14.94%	15,797
Gallatin	657	24.27%	1,942	71.74%	108	3.99%	−1,285	−47.47%	2,707
Greene	1,205	21.58%	4,145	74.22%	235	4.20%	−2,940	−52.64%	5,585
Grundy	8,065	34.71%	13,454	57.90%	1,718	7.39%	−5,389	−23.19%	23,237
Hamilton	802	19.30%	3,206	77.14%	148	3.56%	−2,404	−57.84%	4,156
Hancock	2,139	23.45%	6,430	70.50%	552	6.05%	−4,291	−47.05%	9,121
Hardin	420	19.55%	1,653	76.96%	75	3.49%	−1,233	−57.41%	2,148
Henderson	1,155	32.83%	2,155	61.26%	208	5.91%	−1,000	−28.43%	3,518
Henry	8,871	36.00%	13,985	56.75%	1,787	7.25%	−5,114	−20.75%	24,643
Iroquois	2,504	19.11%	9,750	74.42%	848	6.47%	−7,246	−55.31%	13,102
Jackson	11,634	47.26%	10,843	44.05%	2,140	8.69%	791	3.21%	24,617
Jasper	924	18.08%	3,975	77.76%	213	4.16%	−3,051	−59.68%	5,112
Jefferson	4,425	26.03%	11,695	68.80%	879	5.17%	−7,270	−42.77%	16,999
Jersey	2,679	24.37%	7,748	70.49%	564	5.14%	−5,069	−46.12%	10,991
Jo Daviess	4,462	39.37%	6,121	54.01%	751	6.62%	−1,659	−14.64%	11,334
Johnson	1,142	18.76%	4,649	76.35%	298	4.89%	−3,507	−57.59%	6,089
Kane	103,665	51.91%	82,734	41.43%	13,288	6.66%	20,931	10.48%	199,687
Kankakee	18,971	40.10%	25,129	53.12%	3,205	6.78%	−6,158	−13.02%	47,305
Kendall	24,884	46.03%	24,961	46.18%	4,210	7.79%	−77	−0.15%	54,055
Knox	10,083	44.81%	10,737	47.71%	1,683	7.48%	−654	−2.90%	22,503
Lake	171,095	56.37%	109,767	36.16%	22,658	7.47%	61,328	20.21%	303,520
LaSalle	19,543	39.29%	26,689	53.65%	3,511	7.06%	−7,146	−14.36%	49,743
Lawrence	1,290	21.17%	4,521	74.19%	283	4.64%	−3,231	−53.02%	6,094
Lee	5,528	35.69%	8,612	55.60%	1,349	8.71%	−3,084	−19.91%	15,489
Livingston	4,023	26.22%	10,208	66.54%	1,111	7.24%	−6,185	−40.32%	15,342
Logan	3,313	26.72%	8,181	65.97%	907	7.31%	−4,868	−39.25%	12,401
Macon	18,343	38.17%	26,866	55.90%	2,851	5.93%	−8,523	−17.73%	48,060
Macoupin	6,689	29.87%	14,322	63.96%	1,380	6.17%	−7,633	−34.09%	22,391
Madison	50,587	38.86%	70,490	54.15%	9,102	6.99%	−19,903	−15.29%	130,179
Marion	4,369	25.55%	11,859	69.36%	870	5.09%	−7,490	−43.81%	17,098
Marshall	1,789	29.90%	3,785	63.25%	410	6.85%	−1,996	−33.35%	5,984
Mason	2,014	31.02%	4,058	62.50%	421	6.48%	−2,044	−31.48%	6,493
Massac	1,558	23.26%	4,846	72.36%	293	4.38%	−3,288	−49.10%	6,697
McDonough	5,288	40.23%	6,795	51.70%	1,061	8.07%	−1,507	−11.47%	13,144
McHenry	60,803	42.24%	71,612	49.75%	11,515	8.01%	−10,809	−7.51%	143,930
McLean	36,196	44.51%	37,237	45.79%	7,891	9.70%	−1,041	−1.28%	81,324
Menard	1,817	27.89%	4,231	64.94%	467	7.17%	−2,414	−37.05%	6,515
Mercer	3,071	36.02%	4,807	56.39%	647	7.59%	−1,736	−20.37%	8,525
Monroe	5,535	28.60%	12,629	65.25%	1,190	6.15%	−7,094	−36.65%	19,354
Montgomery	3,504	27.00%	8,630	66.50%	844	6.50%	−5,126	−39.50%	12,978
Morgan	4,696	31.73%	9,076	61.32%	1,028	6.95%	−4,380	−29.59%	14,800
Moultrie	1,481	23.57%	4,455	70.91%	347	5.52%	−2,974	−47.34%	6,283
Ogle	8,050	33.27%	14,352	59.32%	1,791	7.41%	−6,302	−26.05%	24,193
Peoria	38,060	48.12%	35,633	45.05%	5,409	6.83%	2,427	3.07%	79,102
Perry	2,462	24.93%	6,855	69.42%	557	5.65%	−4,393	−44.49%	9,874
Piatt	2,645	29.19%	5,634	62.19%	781	8.62%	−2,989	−33.00%	9,060
Pike	1,413	18.76%	5,754	76.41%	363	4.83%	−4,341	−57.65%	7,530
Pope	375	17.51%	1,678	78.34%	89	4.15%	−1,303	−60.83%	2,142
Pulaski	962	35.17%	1,675	61.24%	98	3.59%	−713	−26.07%	2,735
Putnam	1,147	36.86%	1,767	56.78%	198	6.36%	−620	−19.92%	3,112
Randolph	3,439	24.23%	10,023	70.61%	732	5.16%	−6,584	−46.38%	14,194
Richland	1,584	20.59%	5,739	74.59%	371	4.82%	−4,155	−54.00%	7,694
Rock Island	32,298	50.47%	26,998	42.19%	4,698	7.34%	5,300	8.28%	63,994
Saline	2,572	22.59%	8,276	72.70%	536	4.71%	−5,704	−50.11%	11,384
Sangamon	40,907	41.58%	49,944	50.77%	7,522	7.65%	−9,037	−9.19%	98,373
Schuyler	1,075	28.04%	2,524	65.83%	235	6.13%	−1,449	−37.79%	3,834
Scott	535	20.51%	1,966	75.38%	107	4.11%	−1,431	−54.87%	2,608
Shelby	2,288	20.71%	8,229	74.48%	532	4.81%	−5,941	−53.77%	11,049
St. Clair	60,756	50.03%	53,857	44.35%	6,823	5.62%	6,899	5.68%	121,436
Stark	751	27.38%	1,778	64.82%	214	7.80%	−1,027	−37.44%	2,743
Stephenson	7,768	38.19%	11,083	54.48%	1,492	7.33%	−3,315	−16.29%	20,343
Tazewell	20,685	31.95%	38,707	59.78%	5,359	8.27%	−18,022	−27.83%	64,751
Union	2,402	27.88%	5,790	67.20%	424	4.92%	−3,388	−39.32%	8,616
Vermilion	10,039	32.58%	19,087	61.93%	1,692	5.49%	−9,048	−29.35%	30,818
Wabash	1,151	21.07%	4,047	74.07%	266	4.86%	−2,896	−53.00%	5,464
Warren	2,987	38.26%	4,275	54.76%	545	6.98%	−1,288	−16.50%	7,807
Washington	1,448	19.47%	5,571	74.90%	419	5.63%	−4,123	−55.43%	7,438
Wayne	1,048	12.62%	6,967	83.93%	286	3.45%	−5,919	−71.31%	8,301
White	1,412	19.25%	5,640	76.89%	283	3.86%	−4,228	−57.64%	7,335
Whiteside	11,035	43.14%	12,615	49.31%	1,932	7.55%	−1,580	−6.17%	25,582
Will	151,927	49.94%	132,720	43.63%	19,579	6.43%	19,207	6.31%	304,226
Williamson	8,581	26.94%	21,570	67.72%	1,701	5.34%	−12,989	−40.78%	31,852
Winnebago	55,713	46.41%	55,624	46.33%	8,718	7.26%	89	0.08%	120,055
Woodford	5,092	25.63%	13,207	66.49%	1,565	7.88%	−8,115	−40.86%	19,864
Totals	3,090,729	55.83%	2,146,015	38.76%	299,680	5.41%	944,714	17.07%	5,536,424

Counties that flipped from Democratic to Republican

- Alexander (largest city: Cairo)
- Carroll (largest city: Savanna)
- Fulton (largest city: Canton)
- Henderson (largest village: Oquawka)
- Henry (largest city: Kewanee)
- Jo Daviess (largest city: Galena)
- Knox (largest city: Galesburg)
- Mercer (largest city: Aledo)
- Putnam (largest village: Granville)
- Warren (largest city: Monmouth)
- Whiteside (largest city: Sterling)

==== By congressional district ====
Clinton won 11 of 18 congressional districts, both candidates won a district held by the other party.

District	Clinton	Trump	Representative
1st	75%	21%	Bobby Rush
2nd	77%	19%	Robin Kelly
3rd	55%	39%	Dan Lipinski
4th	81%	13%	Luis Gutierrez
5th	70%	24%	Mike Quigley
6th	49%	43%	Peter Roskam
7th	87%	9%	Danny K. Davis
8th	57%	36%	Tammy Duckworth
8th	57%	36%	Raja Krishnamoorthi
9th	69%	25%	Jan Schakowsky
10th	61%	32%	Robert Dold
10th	61%	32%	Brad Schneider
11th	58%	35%	Bill Foster
12th	40%	54%	Mike Bost
13th	44%	49%	Rodney Davis
14th	44%	48%	Randy Hultgren
15th	24%	70%	John Shimkus
16th	38%	55%	Adam Kinzinger
17th	46%	47%	Cheri Bustos
18th	33%	60%	Darin LaHood

=== Turnout ===
For the state-run primaries (Democratic and Republican), turnout was 45.73%, with 3,505,795 votes cast. For the general election, turnout was 68.95%, with 5,536,424 votes cast.

== Analysis ==
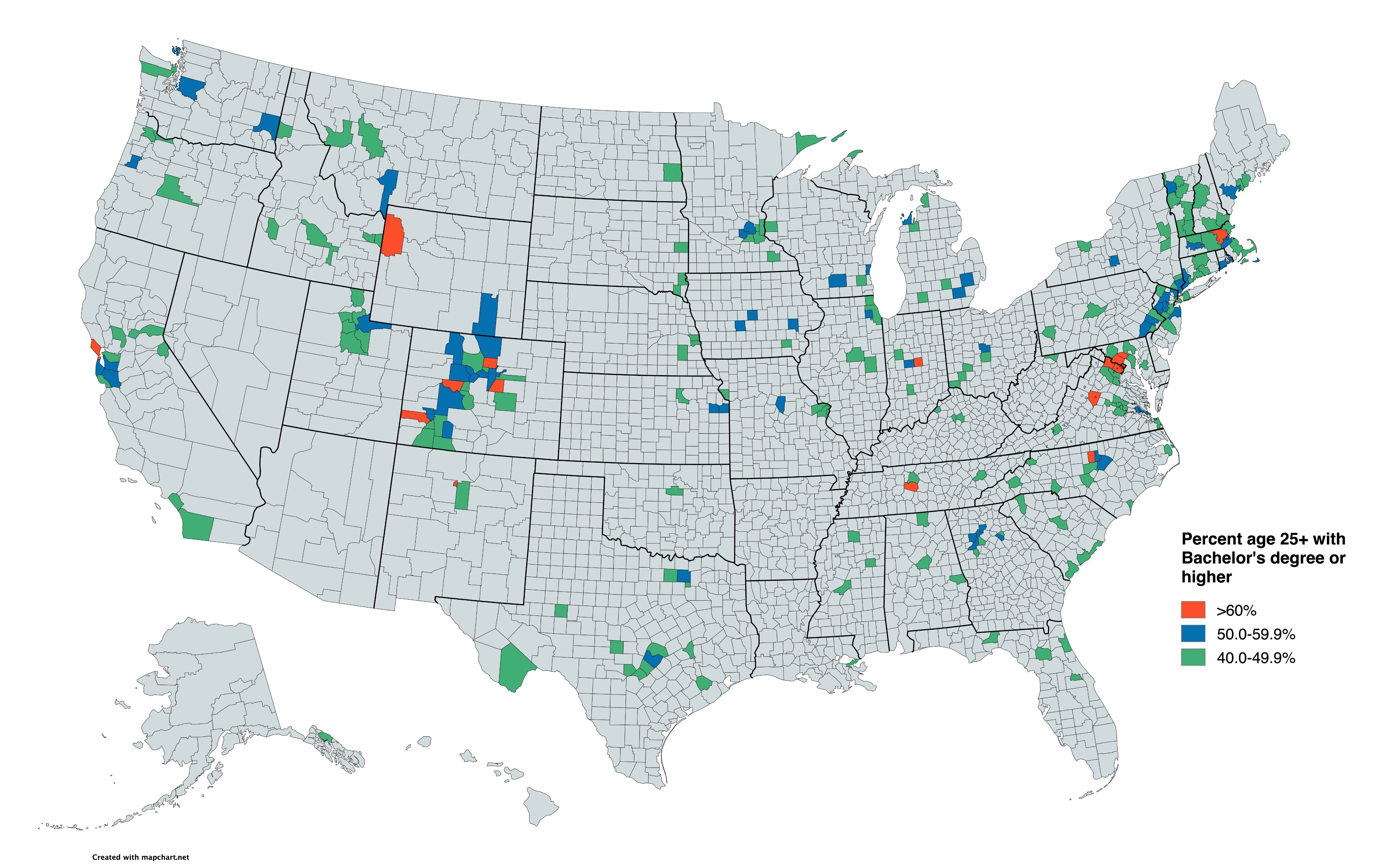
A map of the most college-educated counties in the United States

Although Clinton won the state by a nearly identical margin as Obama, the state’s internal politics changed dramatically. Clinton made massive gains in the state’s most college-educated counties, while Trump made massive gains in the rest of the state.

Clinton's win in Illinois was largely the result of a lopsided victory in Cook County, the state's most populous county and home of Chicago, the city where Clinton was born and raised. Trump, meanwhile, won most of the downstate rural counties by large margins. Many of these counties had voted for Clinton's husband in both his 1992 and 1996 presidential runs. This is also the first presidential election in history where a Republican managed to win the White House nationally while failing to carry any of Chicago's collar counties (winning only McHenry County). To put in perspective the political turnaround in the region, between the 1854 creation of the Republican party and Bill Clinton's 1992 election, Democrats won any of the collar counties in just three landslide elections. In 1932 and 1936, Franklin Roosevelt carried Will County, and in 1964, Lyndon Johnson carried Will and Lake counties.

Illinois, along with Minnesota, was one of the only two Midwestern states not won by Donald Trump. The election marked the first time since 1988 in which Illinois did not vote the same as neighboring Wisconsin, and the first time since 1960 when the Democratic candidate won Illinois, while losing Wisconsin. This is the first time the Republicans have won Alexander County since Richard Nixon's 1972 landslide, as well as the first time they have won Fulton, Henderson, Knox, Mercer, and Putnam Counties since Ronald Reagan's 1984 landslide. Whiteside County voted Republican for the first time since 1988.

Cook County, the collar counties, and the downstate counties of Champaign and McLean were the only ones to swing towards Clinton. Champaign is the home of the University of Illinois Urbana-Champaign, while McLean is the home of Illinois State University. Knowing these statistics, if one were to subtract Cook County's total votes from the rest of Illinois, Trump would have won the state with 1,692,728 votes to Clinton's 1,478,783 votes.

Had Clinton won the election, she would have become the second president born in Illinois after Ronald Reagan, although both politicians jump-started their political careers in elected office elsewhere. Reagan served as Governor of California while Clinton served as a United States Senator from New York. As of the 2024 election, this is the most recent election where Kendall County and McLean County have voted Republican.

== See also ==
- United States presidential elections in Illinois
- 2016 Democratic Party presidential debates and forums
- 2016 Democratic Party presidential primaries
- 2016 Republican Party presidential debates and forums
- 2016 Republican Party presidential primaries
- 2016 Donald Trump Chicago rally protest
