= Jill Stein 2016 presidential campaign =

Political campaign for United States presidency

Jill Stein for President
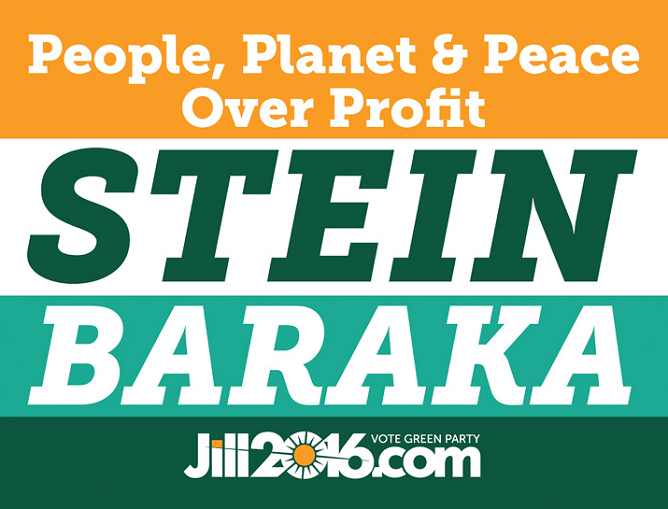
- Campaign: U.S. presidential election, 2016
- Candidate: Jill Stein; Former member of the Lexington; Town Meeting from the 2nd district (2005–2011); Ajamu Baraka; Human rights activist Howie Hawkins (Minnesota)
- Affiliation: Green Party
- Status: Announced: June 22, 2015; Presumptive nominee: June 15, 2016; Official nominee: August 6, 2016; Lost election: November 8, 2016
- Headquarters: Brooklyn, New York
- Key people: Ajamu Baraka (running mate); David Cobb (campaign manager)
- Receipts: US$11,499,548.55 (2016-09-31)
- Slogan: 1. ItsInOurHands

Website
- www.Jill2016.com (archived - November 7, 2016)

Jill Stein, a physician from Massachusetts, announced her entry into the 2016 United States presidential election on June 22, 2015. Stein had been the Green Party's presidential nominee in 2012, in which she received 469,627 votes. In the 2016 election, she once again secured the Green Party nomination and lost in the general election. She received 1.07% of the popular vote and no electoral college delegates.

She formally announced her second presidential bid on Democracy Now! on June 22, 2015.

On June 15, 2016, she reached the necessary number of delegates for the presumptive Green nomination. On August 1, 2016, Stein announced that she had selected international human rights activist Ajamu Baraka as her running mate.

Stein officially received the Green Party presidential nomination on August 6, 2016, at the party's nominating convention in Houston, Texas.

== Background ==
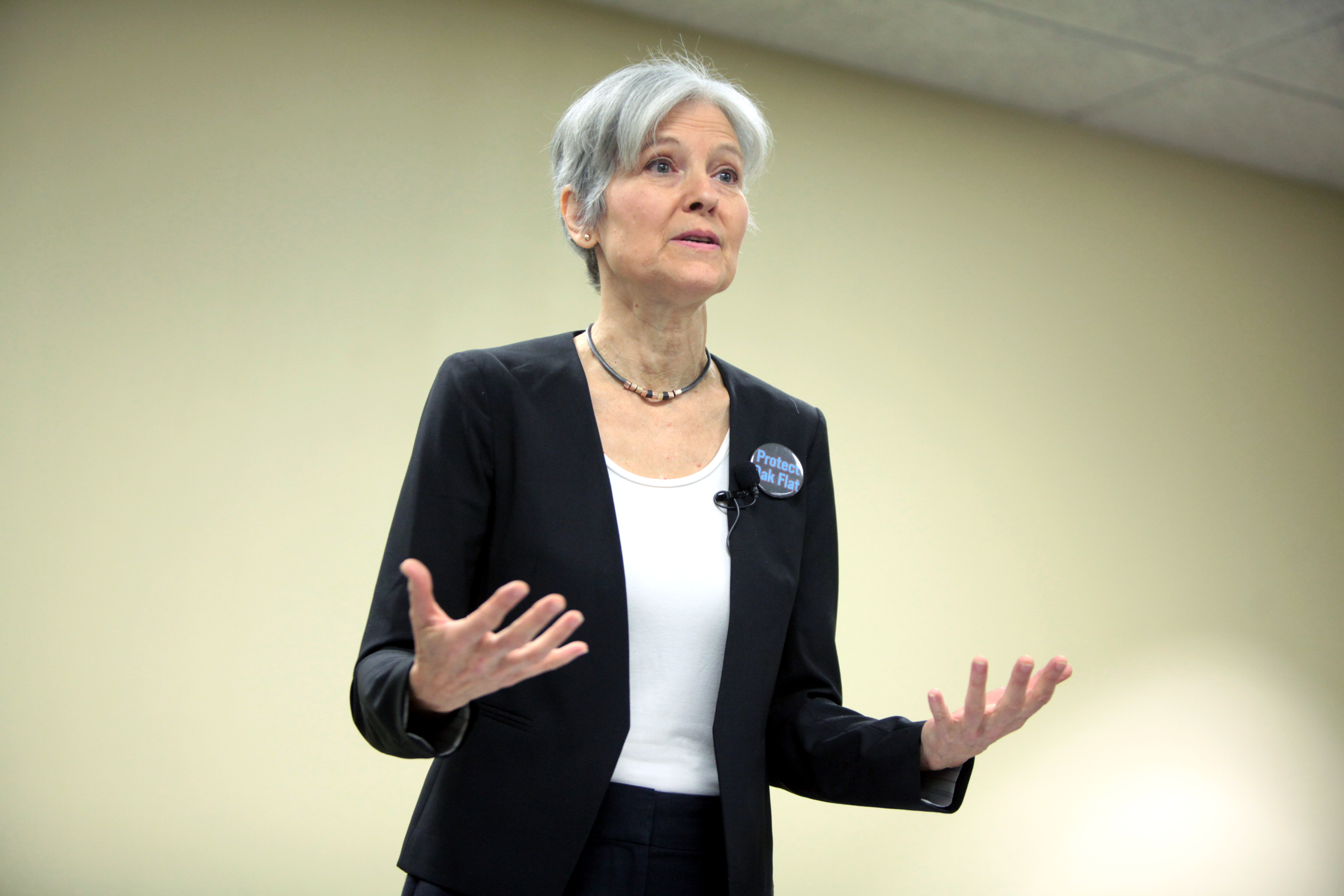
Stein speaking at a campaign event in Mesa, Arizona

On February 6, 2015, Stein announced the formation of an exploratory committee for a campaign for the Green Party's presidential nomination in 2016. In a June 2015 interview on The Alan Colmes Show, Stein said that she would announce her intention to run for President "certainly before the summer is up, probably a lot sooner than that".

In December 2015, Stein took part in the 2015 United Nations Climate Change Conference (COP 21) in Paris, speaking at several forums. On February 24, Stein was invited to speak at the Oxford Union at the University of Oxford in England. In March 2016, Stein was one of only two presidential candidates to receive an A rating for their health plan from Physicians for a National Health Program, an advocacy group for single-payer health care, out of an analysis of the health plans of six presidential candidates, including the top two Democratic candidates and the top three Republican candidates. In May 2016, the Marijuana Policy Project released a voter guide of the candidates of the four largest political parties (Democratic, Republican, Libertarian, and Green) in the 2016 election. Stein received an A+, tying her with Gary Johnson and placing her above the Democratic and Republican candidates.

== History ==
Stein began taking part in the 2016 Green Party presidential primaries in February 2016. Stein was immediately the front-runner and was described as "steamrolling to victory." On June 15, 2016, the Stein campaign announced that it had received 203 delegates, enough to win the nomination on the first ballot at the 2016 Green National Convention.

During the 2016 Democratic National Convention, the Green Party encouraged supporters of runner-up Bernie Sanders to back the Greens instead of Hillary Clinton. Stein officially won the Green Party nomination on August 6, 2016.

== Running mate selection ==
On July 31, Democratic former Ohio state senator Nina Turner, who had been a top campaign surrogate for the Democratic primary campaign of Bernie Sanders, confirmed that Stein had offered to make her vice presidential running mate. Turner said she would have not decided whether she would accept the offer. The following day, Turner turned down the offer, saying, "I'm going to keep fighting in the party, even though I'm disappointed. I'm a Democrat, and that's worth fighting for."

On August 1, same day that Turner rejected Stein's offer, Stein announced that she had selected activist Ajamu Baraka to be her running mate.

== Fundraising ==
In an e-mail to supporters on June 10, 2015, Stein wrote "I'm preparing to make a big announcement next week." She also challenged her supporters to raise $10,000 in that time period. Two days later on June 12, Stein's campaign sent another e-mail indicating that she had surpassed that goal and raised her fundraising goal to $30,000. Stein noted that she would seek to qualify for matching funds from the federal government by raising at least $5,000 from residents of 20 states before receiving the nomination in 2016. The e-mail indicated that she had already raised more than the requisite amount from residents of California and that Washington State, New York, and others were very close behind. In September, Stein's campaign said they had met the $5,000 mark in five states (California, Florida, Massachusetts, New York, and Washington) and had received at least half of that amount in eight others.

As of November 22, 2015, Stein's campaign had surpassed the requisite fundraising totals in at least 9 states. On November 28, Richard Winger of Ballot Access News reported that Stein would likely qualify for the initial public funding before January 1, 2016. However, on January 3, Ballot Access News reported that Stein's campaign had only qualified in 13 states. It said that the campaign was trying to qualify in 8 others. On January 8, Stein's campaign announced it had enough contributions to qualify for FEC funds. Nevertheless, the campaign did not submit its request for matching funds and accompanying documentation until March 28, after which the FEC declared Stein eligible for matching funds on April 14, 2016.

In January 2017, Stein and her campaign received the final amount of matching funds from the FEC. The final check equaled $134,900. Overall, the campaign received $590,935.39 in matching funds.

== Platform and issues ==
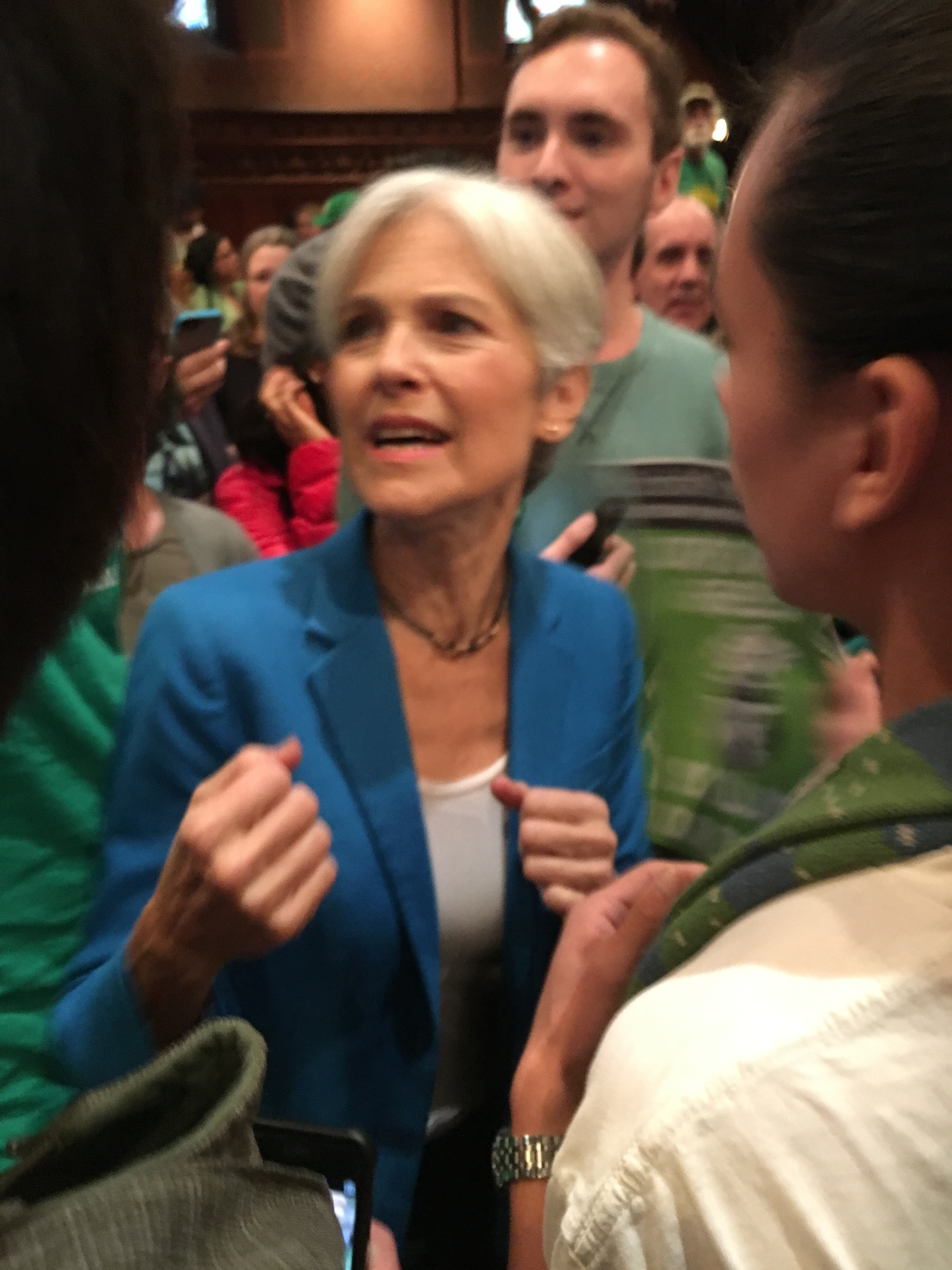
Stein with supporters at a rally in Boston, Massachusetts

The Stein platform was labeled a "power to the people plan."

The main issues of Stein's platform were:

- A Green New Deal
- Jobs as a Right
- End Poverty
- Health Care as a Right
- Education as a Right
- A Just Economy
- Protect Mother Earth
- Racial Justice Now
- Freedom and Equality
- Justice for All
- Peace and Human Rights
- Empower the People

== Ballot status ==
| | Electoral Votes | 2016 | 2012 | 2008^{A} | 2004^{A} | 2000^{B} |
|---|---|---|---|---|---|---|
| States (& DC) | 51 | 45 (48) | 37 (44) | 32 (48) | 25 (43) | 44 (48) |
| Electoral Votes | 538 | 480 (522) | 439 (489) | 368 (528) | 267 (479) | 481 (513) |
| Percent of EVs | 100% | 89.2% (97.0%) | 81.6% (90.9%) | 71.0% (96.2%) | 49.6% (89.0%) | 89.4% (95.4%) |
| Alabama | 9 | On ballot | On ballot | (write-in) | (write-in) | On ballot |
| Alaska | 3 | On ballot | On ballot | (write-in) | On ballot | On ballot |
| Arizona | 11 | On ballot | On ballot | On ballot | (write-in) | On ballot |
| Arkansas | 6 | On ballot | On ballot | On ballot | On ballot | On ballot |
| California | 55 | On ballot | On ballot | On ballot | On ballot | On ballot |
| Colorado | 9 | On ballot | On ballot | On ballot | On ballot | On ballot |
| Connecticut | 7 | On ballot | (write-in) | (write-in) | On ballot | On ballot |
| Delaware | 3 | On ballot | On ballot | On ballot | On ballot | On ballot |
| Florida | 29 | On ballot | On ballot | On ballot | On ballot | On ballot |
| Georgia | 16 | (write-in) | (write-in) | (write-in) | (write-in) | (write-in) |
| Hawaii | 4 | On ballot | On ballot | On ballot | On ballot | On ballot |
| Idaho | 4 | On ballot | On ballot | (write-in) | (write-in) | (write-in) |
| Illinois | 20 | On ballot | On ballot | On ballot | (write-in) | On ballot |
| Indiana | 11 | (write-in) | (write-in) | (write-in) | (write-in) | (write-in) |
| Iowa | 6 | On ballot | On ballot | On ballot | On ballot | On ballot |
| Kansas | 6 | On ballot | (write-in) | (write-in) | (write-in) | On ballot |
| Kentucky | 8 | On ballot | On ballot | (write-in) | | On ballot |
| Louisiana | 8 | On ballot | On ballot | On ballot | On ballot | On ballot |
| Maine | 4 | On ballot | On ballot | On ballot | On ballot | On ballot |
| Maryland | 10 | On ballot | On ballot | On ballot | On ballot | On ballot |
| Massachusetts | 11 | On ballot | On ballot | On ballot | | On ballot |
| Michigan | 16 | On ballot | On ballot | On ballot | On ballot | On ballot |
| Minnesota | 10 | On ballot | On ballot | On ballot | On ballot | On ballot |
| Mississippi | 6 | On ballot | On ballot | On ballot | On ballot | On ballot |
| Missouri | 10 | On ballot | | (write-in) | | On ballot |
| Montana | 3 | On ballot | | (write-in) | On ballot | On ballot |
| Nebraska | 5 | On ballot | | On ballot | On ballot | On ballot |
| Nevada | 6 | | On ballot | On ballot | | On ballot |
| New Hampshire | 4 | On ballot | (write-in) | (write-in) | (write-in) | On ballot |
| New Jersey | 14 | On ballot | On ballot | On ballot | On ballot | On ballot |
| New Mexico | 5 | On ballot | On ballot | On ballot | On ballot | On ballot |
| New York | 29 | On ballot | On ballot | On ballot | (write-in) | On ballot |
| North Carolina | 15 | (write-in) | (write-in) | (write-in) | (write-in) | |
| North Dakota | 3 | On ballot | On ballot | (write-in) | | On ballot |
| Ohio | 18 | On ballot | On ballot | On ballot | (write-in) | On ballot |
| Oklahoma | 7 | | | | | |
| Oregon | 7 | On ballot | On ballot | On ballot | On ballot | On ballot |
| Pennsylvania | 20 | On ballot | On ballot | (write-in) | On ballot | On ballot |
| Rhode Island | 4 | On ballot | On ballot | On ballot | On ballot | On ballot |
| South Carolina | 9 | On ballot | On ballot | On ballot | On ballot | On ballot |
| South Dakota | 3 | | | | | |
| Tennessee | 11 | On ballot | On ballot | On ballot | (write-in) | On ballot |
| Texas | 38 | On ballot | On ballot | (write-in) | (write-in) | On ballot |
| Utah | 6 | On ballot | On ballot | On ballot | (write-in) | On ballot |
| Vermont | 3 | On ballot | (write-in) | (write-in) | (write-in) | On ballot |
| Virginia | 13 | On ballot | On ballot | On ballot | (write-in) | On ballot |
| Washington | 12 | On ballot | On ballot | On ballot | On ballot | On ballot |
| West Virginia | 5 | On ballot | On ballot | On ballot | (write-in) | On ballot |
| Wisconsin | 10 | On ballot | On ballot | On ballot | On ballot | On ballot |
| Wyoming | 3 | On ballot | (write-in) | (write-in) | (write-in) | (write-in) |
| District of Columbia | 3 | On ballot | On ballot | On ballot | (write-in) | On ballot |

A. Based on 2004 - 2008 electoral college apportionment.
B. Based on 1992 - 2000 electoral college apportionment.

== Results ==
This map shows the percentage of the popular vote Jill Stein earned in each county.

On Election Day, Stein finished in 4th with over 1,457,216 votes (more than the previous three Green tickets combined) and 1.07% of the popular vote. However, she finished three million votes under Gary Johnson as the Greens once again finished behind the Libertarian Party, though they did gain more votes than Independent candidate Evan McMullin and Constitution Party candidate Darrell Castle.

At the state level, Stein exceeded 2% vote share in Hawaii (12,737, or 2.97%), Oregon (50,002, or 2.50%) and Vermont (6,758, or 2.14%). She won her most votes in California (278,657, or 1.96%). In 22 other states, she crossed 1% of the vote. Although she did not win any counties or congressional districts, Stein placed third in 23 counties and 18 congressional districts nationally. The Stein-Baraka ticket received their highest percentage of the vote in Sioux County, North Dakota (10.39%), while also surpassing five percent in Humboldt County and Mendocino County, California.

She finished in third place in Humboldt and Mendocino, San Francisco, Santa Cruz and Alameda counties in California, Multnomah County, Oregon (3.25%), San Juan County, Washington (4.33%), most counties in Hawaii (Kalawao, Maui, Hawaii and Kauaʻi), and four out of all five boroughs of New York City (Kings, Queens, Bronx and New York counties), in addition to Prince George's County, Maryland and Menominee County, Wisconsin. In Kalawao County, Hawaii, Stein received 25% of the vote and came in 2nd place after Hillary Clinton, although only 20 total votes were cast in the county.

=== Recount petitions ===
On November 23, Stein launched a public fundraiser to pay for recounts in Wisconsin, Michigan, and Pennsylvania, in which she asserted that the election's outcome had been affected by hacking. Changing the outcome in these three states would make Clinton the winner; this would have required showing that collectively fewer than 60,000 of the votes that had been counted for Trump should have been gone to Clinton.

Stein filed for a recount in Wisconsin on November 25. She subsequently filed for recounts in Pennsylvania on November 28, and Michigan on November 30. After unfavorable rulings by the courts, Stein abandoned her recount bids in December 2016.

== Election interference investigation ==
On December 18, 2017, the Washington Post reported that the Senate Intelligence Committee would examine Stein's presidential campaign for potential "collusion with the Russians". The Stein campaign released a statement stating it would work with investigators.

In December 2018, two reports commissioned by the US Senate found that the Internet Research Agency boosted Stein's candidacy through social media posts, targeting African-American voters in particular. After consulting the two reports, NBC News reporter Robert Windrem said that nothing suggested Stein knew about the operation, but added that "the Massachusetts physician ha[d] long been criticized for her support of international policies that mirror Russian foreign policy goals."

== See also ==
- List of elections involving vote splitting
- Nationwide opinion polling for the United States presidential election, 2016
