= 2016 United States presidential election in Texas =

- November 8, 2016
- Turnout: 59.4% (of registered voters) ▲46.5% (of voting age population)

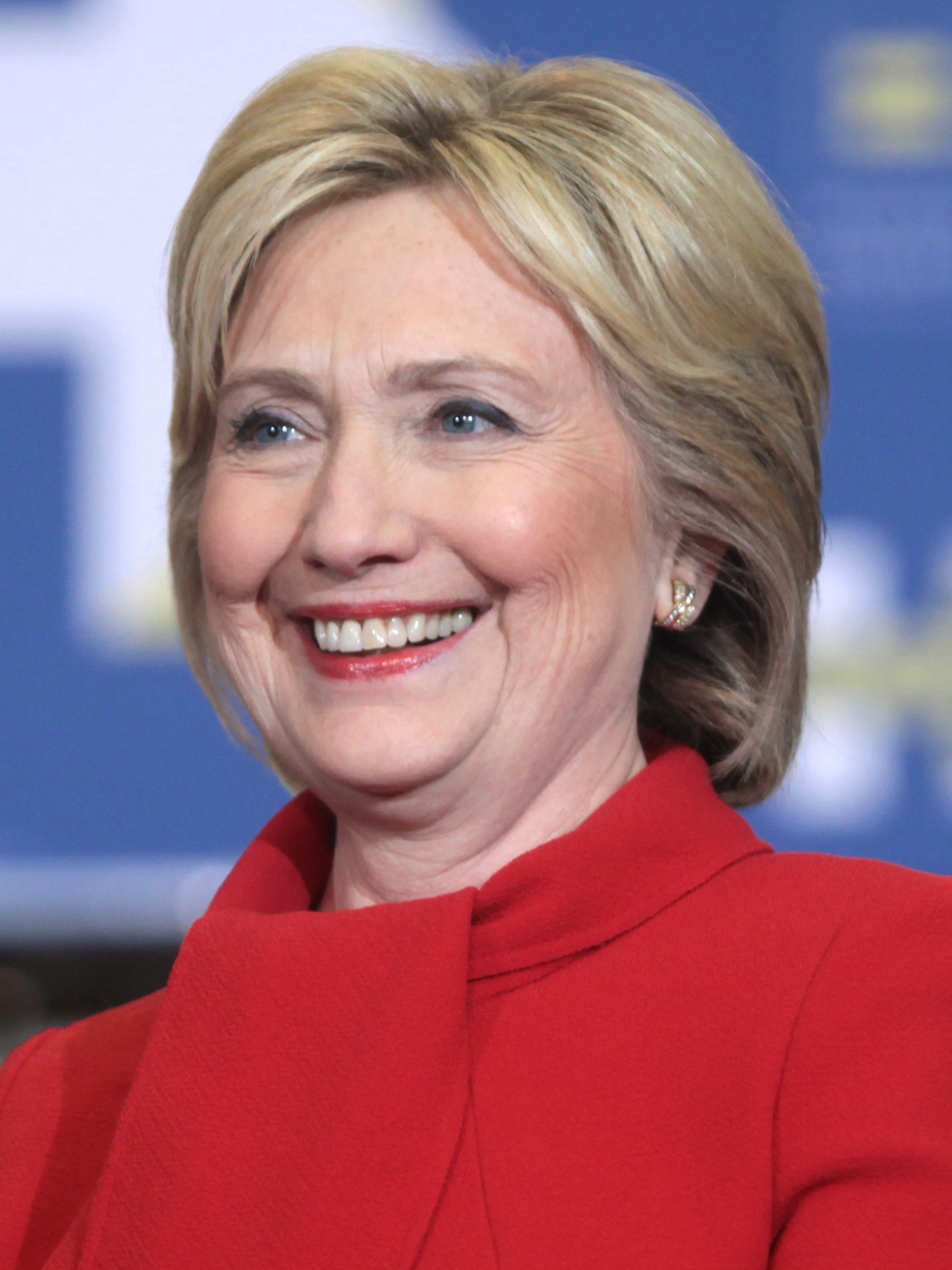
Nominee	Donald Trump	Hillary Clinton
Party	Republican	Democratic
Home state	New York	New York
Running mate	Mike Pence	Tim Kaine
Electoral vote	36 (Note: Trump and Pence earned 38 pledged electoral votes, but Trump lost two and Pence lost one due to faithless electors. Bill Greene voted for Ron Paul (who was not a candidate) for president and Mike Pence (who was on the Republican ticket) as vice president, while Christopher Suprun voted for John Kasich for president and Carly Fiorina for vice president (both not candidates).)	0
Popular vote	4,685,047	3,877,868
Percentage	52.23%	43.24%

Trump
40–50%
50–60%
60–70%
70–80%
80–90%
90–100%
Clinton
40–50%
50–60%
60–70%
70–80%
80–90%
90–100%
President before election
Barack Obama
Democratic
Elected President
Donald Trump
Republican

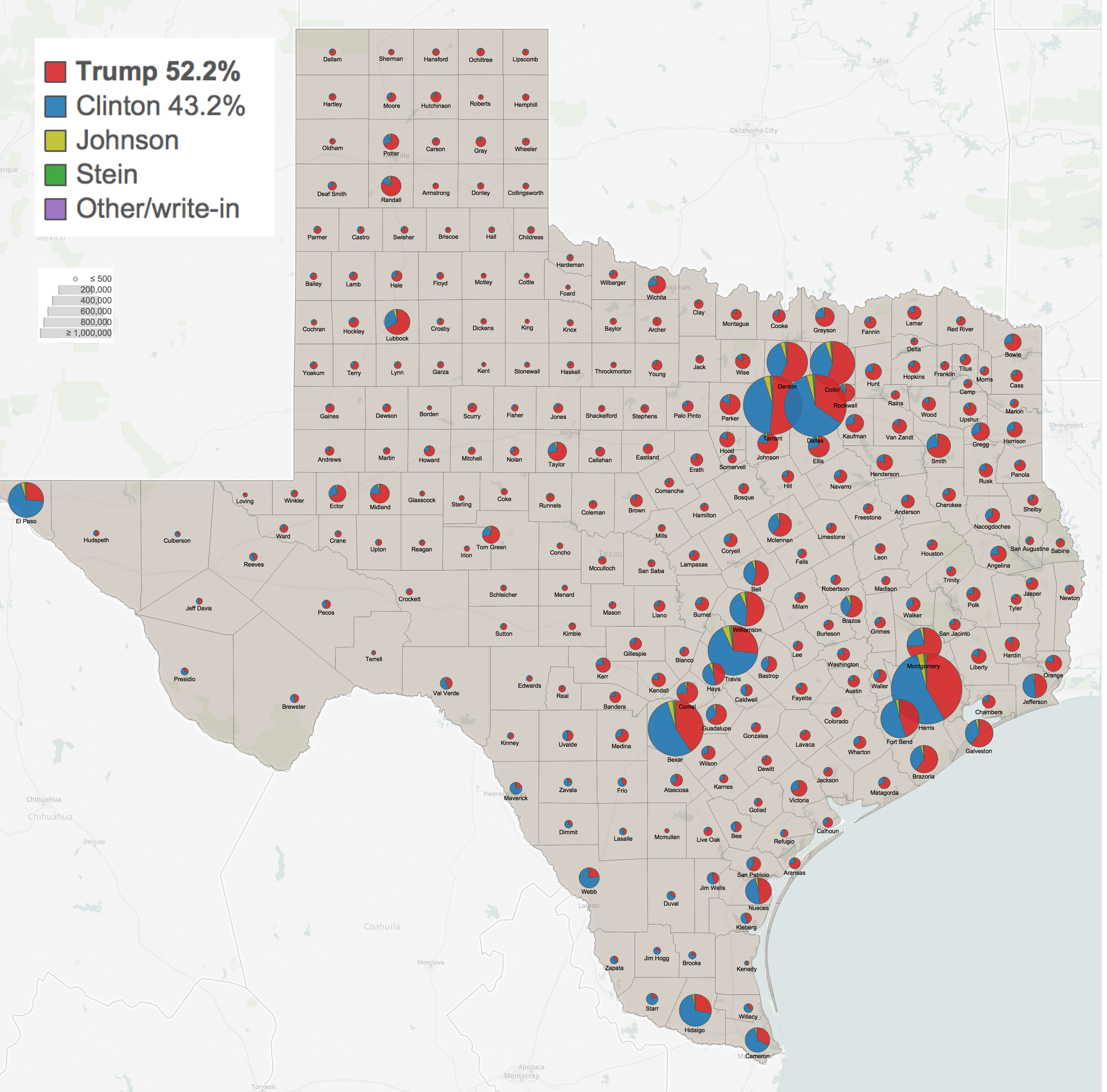
Results by county showing number of votes by size and candidates by color

Treemap of the popular vote by county

The 2016 United States presidential election in Texas took place on November 8, 2016, as part of the 2016 United States presidential election. Primary elections were held on March 1, 2016.

Texas was won by Republican Donald Trump and his running mate Mike Pence by an 8.99% margin over Democrats Hillary Clinton and Tim Kaine. Texas assigned its 38 Electoral College votes to the state's popular vote winner, but two faithless electors chose other candidates, making Texas the only state in 2016 to give Trump fewer than the assigned electoral votes. Even then, its 36 electoral votes were Trump's largest electoral prize in 2016.

When the Electoral College met on December 19, 2016, only 36 of the 38 electors voted for Trump for president. Two electors defected; one voted for Ohio Governor John Kasich, and the other voted for former Congressman Ron Paul, making the latter, at 81 and despite not running, the oldest person to ever receive an electoral vote. For vice president, 37 electors voted for Pence, while one voted for Carly Fiorina. This was the first time since 1976 where a Republican presidential candidate lost a pledged vote via a faithless elector; that year, Gerald Ford lost a Washington state electoral vote to fellow Republican Ronald Reagan. Additionally, this was the first time since 1972 that the winning presidential candidate lost an electoral vote, when Richard Nixon lost a Virginia electoral vote to Libertarian Party nominee John Hospers.

Texas was one of eleven states (and the District of Columbia) where Clinton improved on Barack Obama's performance in 2012. Clinton lost Texas by a smaller margin than any Democrat since 1996 (though her proportion of the vote was slightly smaller than that received by Barack Obama in 2008), which analysts attributed to Trump losing ground with college-educated white voters. Trump's 2016 performance in Texas was the weakest of any victorious Republican nominee since Richard Nixon in 1968 - the last Republican to win the presidency without carrying Texas. Trump in 2016 was the tenth consecutive Republican presidential nominee to win Texas, beginning with Reagan in 1980. Nevertheless, he became the first Republican to win the White House without carrying Bexar County since Richard Nixon in 1968, as well as the first to win without carrying Fort Bend County since Herbert Hoover in 1928, and the first to win without carrying Harris or Dallas County since Calvin Coolidge in 1924.

== Primaries ==
=== Democratic primary ===
The Texas Democratic Party held their state's primary in concurrence with the other Super Tuesday contests on March 1. Eight candidates appeared on the ballot, Hillary Clinton, Bernie Sanders, dropped-out candidate Martin O'Malley and five minor candidates (Rocky De La Fuente, Willie Wilson, Star Locke, Keith Russell Judd and Calvis Hawes.) The Texas Democratic primary had 251 delegates to the Democratic National Convention: 222 pledged delegates and 29 super delegates. 145 delegates were allocated proportionally based on the results in the state's 31 senatorial districts. The other 77 pledged delegates were allocated proportionally based on the statewide popular vote.

==== Results ====
2016 Texas Democratic Party presidential primary
Candidate	Popular vote		Delegates		
Candidate	Count	Percentage	Pledged delegates	Super delegates	Total delegates
Hillary Clinton	936,004	65.19%	147	21	168
Bernie Sanders	476,547	33.19%	75	0	75
Rocky De Le Fuente	8,429	0.59%	0	0	0
Martin O'Malley	5,364	0.37%	0	0	0
Willie Wilson	3,254	0.23%	0	0	0
Keith Russell Judd	2,569	0.18%	0	0	0
Calvis L. Hawes	2,017	0.14%	0	0	0
Star Locke	1,711	0.12%	0	0	0
Uncommitted	n/a			8	8
Total:	1,435,895	100%	222	29	251

Key:	Withdrew prior to contest

=== Republican primary ===
==== Results ====
2016 Texas Republican Party presidential primary
Candidate	Popular vote		Delegates
Candidate	Count	Percentage	Delegates
Ted Cruz	1,241,118	43.76%	104
Donald Trump	758,762	26.75%	48
Marco Rubio	503,055	17.74%	3
John Kasich	120,473	4.25%	0
Ben Carson	117,969	4.16%	0
Jeb Bush	35,420	1.25%	0
Uncommitted	29,609	1.04%	0
Rand Paul	8,000	0.28%	0
Mike Huckabee	6,226	0.22%	0
Elizabeth Gray	5,449	0.19%	0
Chris Christie	3,448	0.12%	0
Carly Fiorina	3,247	0.11%	0
Rick Santorum	2,006	0.07%	0
Lindsey Graham	1,706	0.06%	0
Total:	2,836,488	100%	155

Key:	Withdrew prior to contest

=== Green Party caucus ===
The Texas Green Party held its party caucuses at conventions at the precinct level on March 8, the county level on March 12, and the district level on March 19, leading up to the state nominating convention in Grey Forest, Texas, on April 9 and 10.

On April 10 it was announced that Jill Stein had won the state convention.

Texas Green Party presidential caucus, Saturday, April 9, 2016
Candidate	Votes	Percentage	National delegates
Jill Stein	-	-	15
Sedinam Moyowasifza-Curry	-	-	3
Darryl Cherney	-	-	2
Kent Mesplay	-	-	2
William Kreml	-	-	1
Total	-	100.00%	23

==== Campaign ====
The Green Party did host their National Convention in Houston from August 4–6 at the University of Houston making it the last physical convention for the Green Party to date for a presidential election as one was held virtually for the 2020 and 2024 elections.

== General election ==
=== Polling ===
Trump won every single pre-election poll with margins varying from 2 to 14 points. Trump won the last poll 49% to 35% and the average of the last three polls showed Trump leading 50% to 38%.

=== Predictions ===
The following are final 2016 predictions from various organizations for Texas as of Election Day.

Source	Ranking	As of
Los Angeles Times	Lean R	November 6, 2016
CNN	Safe R	November 8, 2016
Rothenberg Political Report	Safe R	November 7, 2016
Sabato's Crystal Ball	Safe R	November 7, 2016
NBC	Lean R	November 8, 2016
Electoral-vote.com	Lean R	November 8, 2016
RealClearPolitics	Likely R	November 8, 2016
Fox News	Lean R	November 7, 2016
ABC	Safe R	November 7, 2016

=== Results ===
State Senate district results

State House district results

The voting age population was 19,307,355, of which 15,101,087 were registered to vote. Turnout was 8,969,226, which is 46.45% of the voting age population and 59.39% of registered voters. The early voting period lasted for two weeks ending November 4, with 43.5% of registered voters casting early or absentee ballots. Out of those who cast votes, 73% cast their ballots early or absentee and 26% voted on Election Day.

Thirteen candidates received write-in votes, of which the large majority (42,366) went to Evan McMullin.

2016 United States presidential election in Texas
Party	Candidate	Running mate	Votes	Percentage	Electoral votes
Republican	Donald Trump	Mike Pence	4,685,047	52.23%	36
Democratic	Hillary Clinton	Tim Kaine	3,877,868	43.24%	0
Libertarian	Gary Johnson	William Weld	283,492	3.16%	0
Green	Jill Stein	Ajamu Baraka	71,558	0.80%	0
Write-in	Various candidates	Various candidates	51,261	0.57%	0
Republican	John Kasich	Carly Fiorina	0	0.00%	1
Libertarian	Ron Paul	Mike Pence	0	0.00%	1
Totals			8,969,226	100.00%	38
Turnout (VAP)					46.45%

2012-2016 Swing by Precinct Trump: >50%; 40-50%; 30-40%; 20-30%; 15-20%; 10-15%; 5-10%; 1-5%; Clinton: 1-5%; 5-10%; 10-15%; 15-20%; 20-30%; 30-40%; 40-50%; >50%

==== By county ====
County	Donald Trump Republican		Hillary Clinton Democratic		Various candidates Other parties		Margin		Total
County	#	%	#	%	#	%	#	%	Total
Anderson	13,201	77.76%	3,369	19.84%	407	2.40%	9,832	57.92%	16,977
Andrews	3,927	79.45%	836	16.91%	180	3.64%	3,091	62.54%	4,943
Angelina	21,668	72.44%	7,538	25.20%	705	2.36%	14,130	47.24%	29,911
Aransas	7,740	73.63%	2,465	23.45%	307	2.92%	5,275	50.18%	10,512
Archer	3,786	88.40%	394	9.20%	103	2.40%	3,392	79.20%	4,283
Armstrong	924	90.50%	70	6.86%	27	2.64%	854	83.64%	1,021
Atascosa	8,618	63.03%	4,651	34.02%	404	2.95%	3,967	29.01%	13,673
Austin	9,637	78.52%	2,320	18.90%	317	2.58%	7,317	59.62%	12,274
Bailey	1,344	74.96%	397	22.14%	52	2.90%	947	52.82%	1,793
Bandera	8,163	79.89%	1,726	16.89%	329	3.22%	6,437	63.00%	10,218
Bastrop	16,328	56.96%	10,569	36.87%	1,768	6.17%	5,759	20.09%	28,665
Baylor	1,267	84.52%	191	12.74%	41	2.74%	1,076	71.78%	1,499
Bee	4,744	55.91%	3,444	40.59%	297	3.50%	1,300	15.32%	8,485
Bell	51,998	54.33%	37,801	39.50%	5,902	6.17%	14,197	14.83%	95,701
Bexar	240,333	40.42%	319,550	53.74%	34,691	5.84%	-79,217	-13.32%	594,574
Blanco	4,212	74.09%	1,244	21.88%	229	4.03%	2,968	52.21%	5,685
Borden	330	90.41%	31	8.49%	4	1.10%	299	81.92%	365
Bosque	6,339	80.58%	1,278	16.25%	250	3.17%	5,061	64.33%	7,867
Bowie	24,924	72.03%	8,838	25.54%	840	2.43%	16,086	46.49%	34,602
Brazoria	72,791	60.07%	43,200	35.65%	5,190	4.28%	29,591	24.42%	121,181
Brazos	38,738	57.64%	23,121	34.40%	5,352	7.96%	15,617	23.24%	67,211
Brewster	2,077	48.85%	1,873	44.05%	302	7.10%	204	4.80%	4,252
Briscoe	625	84.92%	91	12.36%	20	2.72%	534	72.56%	736
Brooks	613	23.61%	1,937	74.61%	46	1.78%	-1,324	-51.00%	2,596
Brown	12,017	85.68%	1,621	11.56%	388	2.76%	10,396	74.12%	14,026
Burleson	5,316	76.38%	1,491	21.42%	153	2.20%	3,825	54.96%	6,960
Burnet	14,638	76.22%	3,797	19.77%	769	4.01%	10,841	56.45%	19,204
Caldwell	6,691	54.94%	4,795	39.37%	692	5.69%	1,896	15.57%	12,178
Calhoun	4,638	66.50%	2,118	30.37%	218	3.13%	2,520	36.13%	6,974
Callahan	4,865	87.20%	569	10.20%	145	2.60%	4,296	77.00%	5,579
Cameron	29,472	31.80%	59,402	64.10%	3,791	4.10%	-29,930	-32.30%	92,665
Camp	3,201	70.48%	1,260	27.74%	81	1.78%	1,941	42.74%	4,542
Carson	2,620	88.39%	249	8.40%	95	3.21%	2,371	79.99%	2,964
Cass	9,726	78.79%	2,391	19.37%	227	1.84%	7,335	59.42%	12,344
Castro	1,414	70.81%	526	26.34%	57	2.85%	888	44.47%	1,997
Chambers	13,339	79.23%	2,948	17.51%	549	3.26%	10,391	61.72%	16,836
Cherokee	12,919	76.94%	3,469	20.66%	402	2.40%	9,450	56.28%	16,790
Childress	1,802	86.47%	253	12.14%	29	1.39%	1,549	74.33%	2,084
Clay	4,377	87.23%	536	10.68%	105	2.09%	3,841	76.55%	5,018
Cochran	679	75.36%	190	21.09%	32	3.55%	489	54.27%	901
Coke	1,265	88.90%	140	9.84%	18	1.26%	1,125	79.06%	1,423
Coleman	3,177	87.21%	388	10.65%	78	2.14%	2,789	76.56%	3,643
Collin	201,014	55.16%	140,624	38.59%	22,792	6.25%	60,390	16.57%	364,430
Collingsworth	983	85.03%	145	12.54%	28	2.43%	838	72.49%	1,156
Colorado	6,325	74.30%	1,987	23.34%	201	2.36%	4,338	50.96%	8,513
Comal	45,136	72.59%	14,238	22.90%	2,804	4.51%	30,898	49.69%	62,178
Comanche	4,333	82.74%	789	15.07%	115	2.19%	3,544	67.67%	5,237
Concho	885	82.87%	148	13.86%	35	3.27%	737	69.01%	1,068
Cooke	13,181	82.61%	2,352	14.74%	422	2.65%	10,829	67.87%	15,955
Coryell	12,225	66.98%	5,064	27.74%	964	5.28%	7,161	39.24%	18,253
Cottle	506	82.68%	92	15.03%	14	2.29%	414	67.65%	612
Crane	1,049	75.79%	299	21.60%	36	2.61%	750	54.19%	1,384
Crockett	980	70.25%	372	26.67%	43	3.08%	608	43.58%	1,395
Crosby	1,181	68.34%	468	27.08%	79	4.58%	713	41.26%	1,728
Culberson	280	36.51%	454	59.19%	33	4.30%	-174	-22.68%	767
Dallam	1,261	81.67%	222	14.38%	61	3.95%	1,039	67.29%	1,544
Dallas	262,945	34.34%	461,080	60.22%	41,657	5.44%	-198,135	-25.88%	765,682
Dawson	2,636	73.98%	835	23.44%	92	2.58%	1,801	50.54%	3,563
Deaf Smith	2,911	69.05%	1,185	28.11%	120	2.84%	1,726	40.94%	4,216
Delta	1,836	80.49%	400	17.54%	45	1.97%	1,436	62.95%	2,281
Denton	170,603	57.13%	110,890	37.13%	17,152	5.74%	59,713	20.00%	298,645
DeWitt	5,519	80.64%	1,163	16.99%	162	2.37%	4,356	63.65%	6,844
Dickens	755	83.06%	128	14.08%	26	2.86%	627	68.98%	909
Dimmit	974	30.20%	2,173	67.38%	78	2.42%	-1,199	-37.18%	3,225
Donley	1,225	83.62%	191	13.04%	49	3.34%	1,034	70.58%	1,465
Duval	1,316	31.57%	2,783	66.77%	69	1.66%	-1,467	-35.20%	4,168
Eastland	6,011	86.33%	776	11.14%	176	2.53%	5,235	75.19%	6,963
Ector	25,020	68.49%	10,249	28.06%	1,261	3.45%	14,771	40.43%	36,530
Edwards	746	69.52%	303	28.24%	24	2.24%	443	41.28%	1,073
Ellis	44,941	70.10%	16,253	25.35%	2,916	4.55%	28,688	44.75%	64,110
El Paso	55,512	25.71%	147,843	68.47%	12,567	5.82%	-92,331	-42.76%	215,922
Erath	11,210	80.69%	2,160	15.55%	523	3.76%	9,050	65.14%	13,893
Falls	3,441	65.57%	1,684	32.09%	123	2.34%	1,757	33.48%	5,248
Fannin	9,548	79.28%	2,132	17.70%	364	3.02%	7,416	61.57%	12,044
Fayette	8,743	78.24%	2,144	19.19%	287	2.57%	6,599	59.05%	11,174
Fisher	1,265	73.16%	403	23.31%	61	3.53%	862	49.85%	1,729
Floyd	1,474	75.24%	435	22.21%	50	2.55%	1,039	53.03%	1,959
Foard	383	74.66%	113	22.03%	17	3.31%	270	52.63%	513
Fort Bend	117,291	44.76%	134,686	51.39%	10,089	3.85%	-17,395	-6.63%	262,066
Franklin	3,585	81.85%	665	15.18%	130	2.97%	2,920	66.67%	4,380
Freestone	6,026	78.42%	1,471	19.14%	187	2.44%	4,555	59.28%	7,684
Frio	1,856	42.18%	2,444	55.55%	100	2.27%	-588	-13.37%	4,400
Gaines	3,907	84.57%	597	12.92%	116	2.51%	3,310	71.65%	4,620
Galveston	73,757	60.01%	43,658	35.52%	5,488	4.47%	30,099	24.49%	122,903
Garza	1,225	82.55%	230	15.50%	29	1.95%	995	67.05%	1,484
Gillespie	10,446	79.05%	2,288	17.31%	480	3.64%	8,158	61.74%	13,214
Glasscock	553	91.56%	34	5.63%	17	2.81%	519	85.93%	604
Goliad	2,620	70.66%	973	26.24%	115	3.10%	1,647	44.42%	3,708
Gonzales	4,587	72.25%	1,571	24.74%	191	3.01%	3,016	47.51%	6,349
Gray	6,500	87.78%	701	9.47%	204	2.75%	5,799	78.31%	7,405
Grayson	35,325	74.50%	10,301	21.72%	1,790	3.78%	25,024	52.78%	47,416
Gregg	28,764	68.90%	11,677	27.97%	1,308	3.13%	17,087	40.93%	41,749
Grimes	7,065	74.11%	2,194	23.01%	274	2.88%	4,871	51.10%	9,533
Guadalupe	36,632	63.02%	18,391	31.64%	3,100	5.34%	18,241	31.38%	58,123
Hale	6,366	71.87%	2,101	23.72%	391	4.41%	4,265	48.15%	8,858
Hall	893	81.85%	164	15.03%	34	3.12%	729	66.82%	1,091
Hamilton	3,060	84.53%	479	13.23%	81	2.24%	2,581	71.30%	3,620
Hansford	1,730	88.85%	171	8.78%	46	2.37%	1,559	80.07%	1,947
Hardeman	1,207	79.78%	249	16.46%	57	3.76%	958	63.32%	1,513
Hardin	19,606	86.07%	2,780	12.20%	394	1.73%	16,826	73.87%	22,780
Harris	545,955	41.61%	707,914	53.95%	58,243	4.44%	-161,959	-12.34%	1,312,112
Harrison	18,749	70.62%	7,151	26.94%	648	2.44%	11,598	43.68%	26,548
Hartley	1,730	88.63%	173	8.86%	49	2.51%	1,557	79.77%	1,952
Haskell	1,403	79.27%	314	17.74%	53	2.99%	1,089	61.53%	1,770
Hays	33,826	46.87%	33,224	46.04%	5,114	7.09%	602	0.83%	72,164
Hemphill	1,462	85.80%	181	10.62%	61	3.58%	1,281	75.18%	1,704
Henderson	23,650	78.72%	5,669	18.87%	726	2.41%	17,981	59.85%	30,045
Hidalgo	48,642	27.89%	118,809	68.12%	6,957	3.99%	-70,167	-40.23%	174,408
Hill	10,108	77.93%	2,547	19.64%	315	2.43%	7,561	58.29%	12,970
Hockley	5,809	79.46%	1,260	17.23%	242	3.31%	4,549	62.23%	7,311
Hood	21,382	81.42%	4,008	15.26%	872	3.32%	17,374	66.16%	26,262
Hopkins	10,707	79.09%	2,510	18.54%	321	2.37%	8,197	60.55%	13,538
Houston	6,205	74.28%	1,978	23.68%	170	2.04%	4,227	50.60%	8,353
Howard	6,637	76.09%	1,770	20.29%	316	3.62%	4,867	55.80%	8,723
Hudspeth	503	57.75%	324	37.20%	44	5.05%	179	20.55%	871
Hunt	23,910	75.77%	6,396	20.27%	1,248	3.96%	17,514	55.50%	31,554
Hutchinson	7,042	86.35%	854	10.47%	259	3.18%	6,188	75.88%	8,155
Irion	660	86.16%	90	11.75%	16	2.09%	570	74.41%	766
Jack	2,973	88.75%	314	9.37%	63	1.88%	2,659	79.38%	3,350
Jackson	4,266	80.46%	904	17.05%	132	2.49%	3,362	63.41%	5,302
Jasper	10,609	79.06%	2,590	19.30%	220	1.64%	8,019	59.76%	13,419
Jeff Davis	695	58.35%	422	35.43%	74	6.22%	273	22.92%	1,191
Jefferson	42,862	48.92%	42,443	48.44%	2,313	2.64%	419	0.48%	87,618
Jim Hogg	430	20.29%	1,635	77.16%	54	2.55%	-1,205	-56.87%	2,119
Jim Wells	5,420	43.78%	6,694	54.08%	265	2.14%	-1,274	-10.30%	12,379
Johnson	44,382	77.04%	10,988	19.07%	2,236	3.89%	33,394	57.97%	57,606
Jones	4,819	80.86%	936	15.70%	205	3.44%	3,883	65.16%	5,960
Karnes	2,965	70.63%	1,145	27.27%	88	2.10%	1,820	43.36%	4,198
Kaufman	29,587	71.70%	10,278	24.91%	1,400	3.39%	19,309	46.79%	41,265
Kendall	15,700	77.40%	3,643	17.96%	940	4.64%	12,057	59.44%	20,283
Kenedy	84	45.16%	99	53.23%	3	1.61%	-15	-8.07%	186
Kent	360	82.95%	59	13.59%	15	3.46%	301	69.36%	434
Kerr	17,727	76.09%	4,681	20.09%	889	3.82%	13,046	56.00%	23,297
Kimble	1,697	86.94%	206	10.55%	49	2.51%	1,491	76.39%	1,952
King	149	93.71%	5	3.14%	5	3.15%	144	90.57%	159
Kinney	936	65.45%	458	32.03%	36	2.52%	478	33.42%	1,430
Kleberg	4,367	45.55%	4,716	49.19%	504	5.26%	-349	-3.64%	9,587
Knox	1,078	78.86%	247	18.07%	42	3.07%	831	60.79%	1,367
Lamar	14,561	77.81%	3,583	19.15%	570	3.04%	10,978	58.66%	18,714
Lamb	3,111	77.87%	771	19.30%	113	2.83%	2,340	58.57%	3,995
Lampasas	6,385	77.82%	1,483	18.07%	337	4.11%	4,902	59.75%	8,205
La Salle	872	42.35%	1,129	54.83%	58	2.82%	-257	-12.48%	2,059
Lavaca	7,347	84.79%	1,170	13.50%	148	1.71%	6,177	71.29%	8,665
Lee	4,997	76.20%	1,372	20.92%	189	2.88%	3,625	55.28%	6,558
Leon	6,391	85.91%	909	12.22%	139	1.87%	5,482	73.69%	7,439
Liberty	18,892	77.85%	4,862	20.04%	513	2.11%	14,030	57.81%	24,267
Limestone	5,796	74.89%	1,778	22.97%	165	2.14%	4,018	51.92%	7,739
Lipscomb	1,159	87.01%	135	10.14%	38	2.85%	1,024	76.87%	1,332
Live Oak	3,464	80.52%	742	17.25%	96	2.23%	2,722	63.27%	4,302
Llano	8,299	79.44%	1,825	17.47%	323	3.09%	6,474	61.97%	10,447
Loving	58	89.23%	4	6.15%	3	4.62%	54	83.08%	65
Lubbock	65,651	66.31%	28,023	28.30%	5,339	5.39%	37,628	38.01%	99,013
Lynn	1,546	76.95%	403	20.06%	60	2.99%	1,143	56.89%	2,009
Madison	3,351	78.13%	881	20.54%	57	1.33%	2,470	57.59%	4,289
Marion	2,983	70.39%	1,165	27.49%	90	2.12%	1,818	42.90%	4,238
Martin	1,455	82.58%	266	15.10%	41	2.32%	1,189	67.48%	1,762
Mason	1,656	80.51%	354	17.21%	47	2.28%	1,302	63.30%	2,057
Matagorda	8,366	68.60%	3,500	28.70%	330	2.70%	4,866	39.90%	12,196
Maverick	2,816	20.72%	10,397	76.52%	375	2.76%	-7,581	-55.80%	13,588
McCulloch	2,552	82.24%	482	15.53%	69	2.23%	2,070	66.71%	3,103
McLennan	48,260	61.03%	27,063	34.22%	3,752	4.75%	21,197	26.81%	79,075
McMullen	454	90.98%	40	8.02%	5	1.00%	414	82.96%	499
Medina	12,085	70.07%	4,634	26.87%	527	3.06%	7,451	43.20%	17,246
Menard	682	78.94%	154	17.82%	28	3.24%	528	61.12%	864
Midland	36,973	75.13%	10,025	20.37%	2,214	4.50%	26,948	54.76%	49,212
Milam	6,364	73.45%	2,051	23.67%	249	2.88%	4,313	49.78%	8,664
Mills	1,951	86.90%	243	10.82%	51	2.28%	1,708	76.08%	2,245
Mitchell	1,780	81.06%	354	16.12%	62	2.82%	1,426	64.94%	2,196
Montague	7,526	87.47%	885	10.29%	193	2.24%	6,641	77.18%	8,604
Montgomery	150,314	73.00%	45,835	22.26%	9,755	4.74%	104,479	50.74%	205,904
Moore	3,977	75.26%	1,098	20.78%	209	3.96%	2,879	54.48%	5,284
Morris	3,446	69.29%	1,425	28.65%	102	2.06%	2,021	40.64%	4,973
Motley	566	92.03%	40	6.50%	9	1.47%	526	85.53%	615
Nacogdoches	14,771	65.29%	6,846	30.26%	1,005	4.45%	7,925	35.03%	22,622
Navarro	11,994	72.99%	4,002	24.35%	437	2.66%	7,992	48.64%	16,433
Newton	4,288	77.48%	1,156	20.89%	90	1.63%	3,132	56.59%	5,534
Nolan	3,552	73.13%	1,029	21.19%	276	5.68%	2,523	51.94%	4,857
Nueces	50,766	48.62%	49,198	47.12%	4,441	4.26%	1,568	1.50%	104,405
Ochiltree	2,628	87.54%	274	9.13%	100	3.33%	2,354	78.41%	3,002
Oldham	850	89.19%	78	8.18%	25	2.63%	772	81.01%	953
Orange	25,513	79.73%	5,735	17.92%	752	2.35%	19,778	61.81%	32,000
Palo Pinto	8,284	80.66%	1,708	16.63%	278	2.71%	6,576	64.03%	10,270
Panola	8,445	81.08%	1,835	17.62%	136	1.30%	6,610	63.46%	10,416
Parker	46,473	81.79%	8,344	14.69%	2,000	3.52%	38,129	67.10%	56,817
Parmer	1,915	77.66%	485	19.67%	66	2.67%	1,430	57.99%	2,466
Pecos	2,468	58.97%	1,554	37.13%	163	3.90%	914	21.84%	4,185
Polk	15,176	76.45%	4,187	21.09%	489	2.46%	10,989	55.36%	19,852
Potter	19,630	68.09%	7,657	26.56%	1,544	5.35%	11,973	41.53%	28,831
Presidio	652	29.53%	1,458	66.03%	98	4.44%	-806	-36.50%	2,208
Rains	3,968	84.41%	628	13.36%	105	2.23%	3,340	71.05%	4,701
Randall	43,462	80.03%	8,367	15.41%	2,476	4.56%	35,095	64.62%	54,305
Reagan	709	78.43%	167	18.47%	28	3.10%	542	59.96%	904
Real	1,382	82.21%	262	15.59%	37	2.20%	1,120	66.62%	1,681
Red River	3,926	76.07%	1,149	22.26%	86	1.67%	2,777	53.81%	5,161
Reeves	1,417	44.50%	1,659	52.10%	108	3.40%	-242	-7.60%	3,184
Refugio	1,830	62.08%	1,034	35.07%	84	2.85%	796	27.01%	2,948
Roberts	524	94.58%	20	3.61%	10	1.81%	504	90.97%	554
Robertson	4,668	66.35%	2,203	31.31%	164	2.34%	2,465	35.04%	7,035
Rockwall	28,451	70.81%	9,655	24.03%	2,074	5.16%	18,796	46.78%	40,180
Runnels	3,250	85.93%	453	11.98%	79	2.09%	2,797	73.95%	3,782
Rusk	14,675	76.70%	3,935	20.57%	524	2.73%	10,740	56.13%	19,134
Sabine	3,998	85.96%	614	13.20%	39	0.84%	3,384	72.76%	4,651
San Augustine	2,622	73.47%	910	25.50%	37	1.03%	1,712	47.97%	3,569
San Jacinto	8,059	77.92%	2,038	19.70%	246	2.38%	6,021	58.22%	10,343
San Patricio	13,030	60.17%	7,871	36.35%	755	3.48%	5,159	23.82%	21,656
San Saba	2,025	85.91%	293	12.43%	39	1.66%	1,732	73.48%	2,357
Schleicher	821	77.53%	208	19.64%	30	2.83%	613	57.89%	1,059
Scurry	4,410	83.02%	733	13.80%	169	3.18%	3,677	69.22%	5,312
Shackelford	1,378	91.62%	103	6.85%	23	1.53%	1,275	84.77%	1,504
Shelby	7,179	79.01%	1,758	19.35%	149	1.64%	5,421	59.66%	9,086
Sherman	807	86.31%	96	10.27%	32	3.42%	711	76.04%	935
Smith	58,930	69.52%	22,300	26.31%	3,538	4.17%	36,630	43.21%	84,768
Somervell	3,206	82.27%	541	13.88%	150	3.85%	2,665	68.39%	3,897
Starr	2,224	18.94%	9,289	79.12%	227	1.94%	-7,065	-60.18%	11,740
Stephens	3,034	87.44%	348	10.03%	88	2.53%	2,686	77.41%	3,470
Sterling	549	86.73%	70	11.06%	14	2.21%	479	75.67%	633
Stonewall	555	79.17%	135	19.26%	11	1.57%	420	59.91%	701
Sutton	1,075	75.92%	313	22.10%	28	1.98%	762	53.82%	1,416
Swisher	1,671	75.82%	462	20.96%	71	3.22%	1,209	54.86%	2,204
Tarrant	345,921	51.74%	288,392	43.14%	34,201	5.12%	57,529	8.60%	668,514
Taylor	33,250	72.66%	10,085	22.04%	2,424	5.30%	23,165	50.62%	45,759
Terrell	288	65.75%	140	31.96%	10	2.29%	148	33.79%	438
Terry	2,459	73.29%	753	22.44%	143	4.27%	1,706	50.85%	3,355
Throckmorton	715	88.49%	84	10.40%	9	1.11%	631	78.09%	808
Titus	6,511	69.13%	2,597	27.57%	311	3.30%	3,914	41.56%	9,419
Tom Green	27,494	71.45%	9,173	23.84%	1,812	4.71%	18,321	47.61%	38,479
Travis	127,209	27.14%	308,260	65.77%	33,251	7.09%	-181,051	-38.63%	468,720
Trinity	4,737	79.15%	1,154	19.28%	94	1.57%	3,583	59.87%	5,985
Tyler	6,624	82.63%	1,248	15.57%	144	1.80%	5,376	67.06%	8,016
Upshur	13,209	82.49%	2,380	14.86%	424	2.65%	10,829	67.63%	16,013
Upton	1,007	74.76%	286	21.23%	54	4.01%	721	53.53%	1,347
Uvalde	4,835	53.94%	3,867	43.14%	262	2.92%	968	10.80%	8,964
Val Verde	5,890	43.25%	6,964	51.14%	763	5.61%	-1,074	-7.89%	13,617
Van Zandt	18,473	84.39%	2,799	12.79%	618	2.82%	15,674	71.60%	21,890
Victoria	21,275	67.92%	8,866	28.30%	1,183	3.78%	12,409	39.62%	31,324
Walker	12,884	65.08%	6,091	30.77%	821	4.15%	6,793	34.31%	19,796
Waller	10,531	62.74%	5,748	34.25%	505	3.01%	4,783	28.49%	16,784
Ward	2,547	73.93%	783	22.73%	115	3.34%	1,764	51.20%	3,445
Washington	10,945	73.79%	3,382	22.80%	505	3.41%	7,563	50.99%	14,832
Webb	12,947	22.48%	42,307	73.47%	2,331	4.05%	-29,360	-50.99%	57,585
Wharton	10,149	68.89%	4,238	28.77%	345	2.34%	5,911	40.12%	14,732
Wheeler	2,087	90.50%	194	8.41%	25	1.09%	1,893	82.09%	2,306
Wichita	27,631	72.49%	8,770	23.01%	1,718	4.50%	18,861	49.48%	38,119
Wilbarger	3,166	77.13%	809	19.71%	130	3.16%	2,357	57.42%	4,105
Willacy	1,547	30.36%	3,422	67.16%	126	2.48%	-1,875	-36.80%	5,095
Williamson	104,175	50.90%	84,468	41.27%	16,016	7.83%	19,707	9.63%	204,659
Wilson	13,998	72.17%	4,790	24.70%	607	3.13%	9,208	47.47%	19,395
Winkler	1,403	74.79%	420	22.39%	53	2.82%	983	52.40%	1,876
Wise	20,670	83.43%	3,412	13.77%	694	2.80%	17,258	69.66%	24,776
Wood	15,700	83.84%	2,630	14.04%	397	2.12%	13,070	69.80%	18,727
Yoakum	1,797	78.03%	426	18.50%	80	3.47%	1,371	59.53%	2,303
Young	6,601	85.65%	876	11.37%	230	2.98%	5,725	74.28%	7,707
Zapata	1,029	32.75%	2,063	65.66%	50	1.59%	-1,034	-32.91%	3,142
Zavala	694	20.44%	2,636	77.62%	66	1.94%	-1,942	-57.18%	3,396
Totals (Note: Results slightly differ from the broad report vs the broken down certified report that added more votes for third party/write-in candidates.)	4,685,047	52.09%	3,877,868	43.12%	430,940	4.79%	807,179	8.97%	8,993,855

Counties that flipped from Democratic to Republican

- Jefferson (largest city: Beaumont)

Counties that flipped from Republican to Democratic

- Fort Bend (largest city: Sugar Land)
- Kenedy (largest community: Sarita)

==== By congressional district ====
Trump won 22 of 36 congressional districts, while Clinton won 14, including three held by Republicans.

District	Trump	Clinton	Representative
1st	72%	25%	Louie Gohmert
2nd	52%	43%	Ted Poe
3rd	54%	40%	Sam Johnson
4th	75%	22%	John Ratcliffe
5th	63%	34%	Jeb Hensarling
6th	54%	42%	Joe Barton
7th	47%	48%	John Culberson
8th	72%	24%	Kevin Brady
9th	18%	79%	Al Green
10th	52%	43%	Michael McCaul
11th	78%	19%	Mike Conaway
12th	62%	32%	Kay Granger
13th	80%	17%	Mac Thornberry
14th	58%	38%	Randy Weber
15th	40%	56%	Rubén Hinojosa
15th	40%	56%	Vicente Gonzalez
16th	27%	67%	Beto O'Rourke
17th	56%	38%	Bill Flores
18th	20%	76%	Sheila Jackson Lee
19th	72%	23%	Randy Neugebauer
19th	72%	23%	Jodey Arrington
20th	34%	60%	Joaquín Castro
21st	52%	42%	Lamar Smith
22nd	52%	44%	Pete Olson
23rd	46%	49%	Will Hurd
24th	51%	44%	Kenny Marchant
25th	55%	40%	Roger Williams
26th	60%	34%	Michael Burgess
27th	60%	36%	Blake Farenthold
28th	38%	58%	Henry Cuellar
29th	25%	71%	Gene Green
30th	18%	79%	Eddie Bernice Johnson
31st	53%	40%	John Carter
32nd	47%	48%	Pete Sessions
33rd	24%	73%	Marc Veasey
34th	37%	59%	Filemon Vela Jr.
35th	30%	64%	Lloyd Doggett
36th	72%	25%	Brian Babin

== Analysis ==
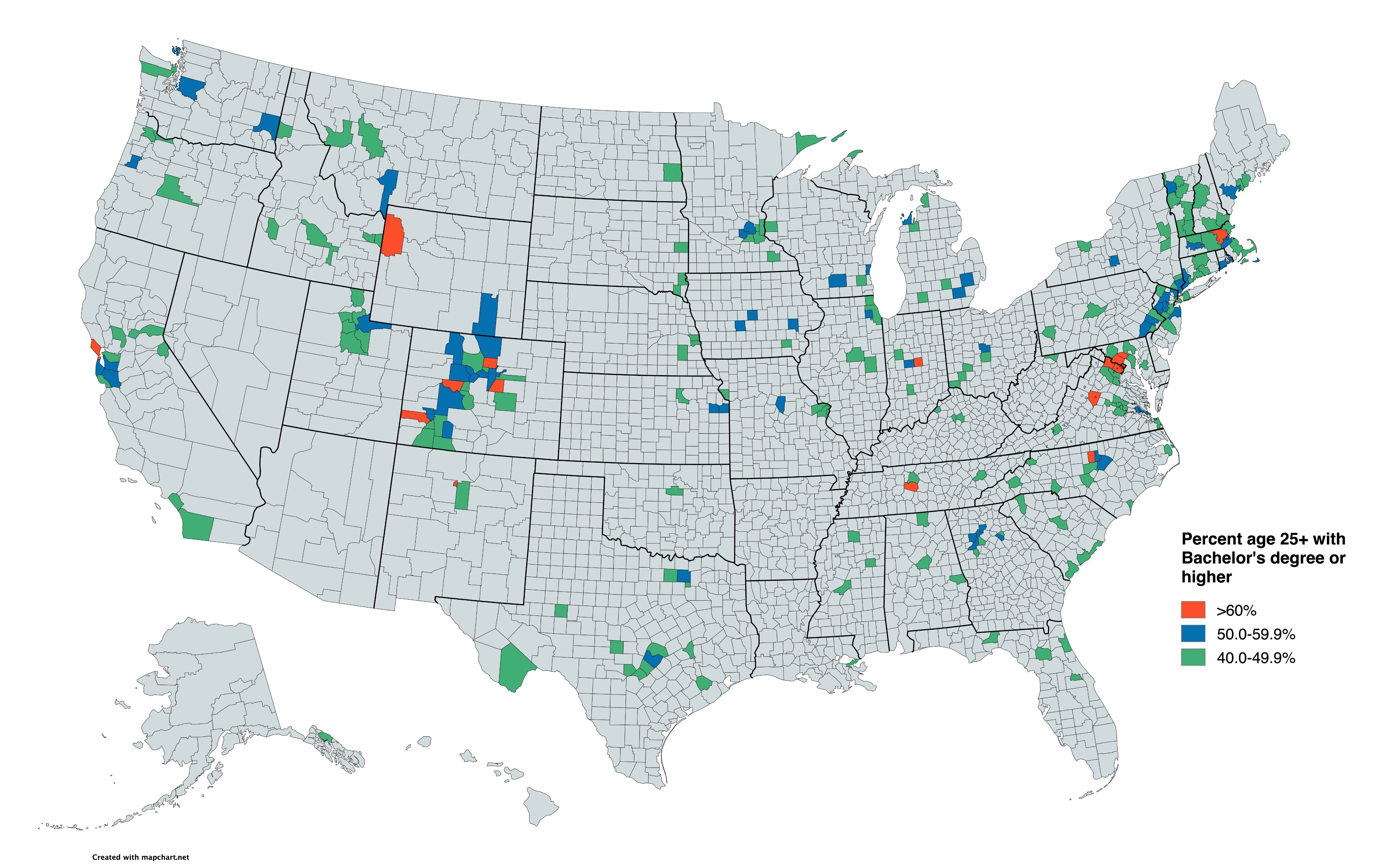
A map of the most college-educated counties in the United States

While he continued the Republican 10-cycle winning streak in Texas, Trump's winning margin was down from Mitt Romney's 15.79% in 2012 to 8.99%, a 6.80% drop, making 2016 the closest Democrats had come to winning Texas since 1996 (though the Democrats also received a smaller percentage of the vote in Texas in this election than in the 2008 presidential election). The surge in Democratic votes can partly be attributed to a growing population of Hispanics/Latinos, Trump's relatively weak performance with college-educated white voters, and the growth of cities and their respective suburbs in the Texas Triangle region, which are heavily populated with both college-educated voters and minorities and thus swung more Democratic compared to 2012. These were Clinton's main sources of votes. She swept the Rio Grande region counties, such as El Paso, Webb, Hidalgo and Cameron as they have sizable Hispanic populations.

Due to Trump's underperformance with college-educated white voters, Clinton made major gains in the Texas Triangle. Clinton scored a 38-point sweep in Travis County, home to the state capital of Austin and the University of Texas at Austin, the best Democratic performance in the county since 1964. She became the first Democrat to break 60% of the vote in Dallas County since 1944. Furthermore, she outperformed Obama in the minority-heavy counties of Bexar (San Antonio) and Harris County (Houston), shifting his slim victories into double-digit leads. In fact, the Presidential vote in Texas' 7th Congressional District, which includes Houston's inner-west suburbs, had the biggest change in margin towards Clinton compared to Obama's 2012 performance outside of Utah, shifting 23 points left. Clinton also won suburban Fort Bend County for the first time since Texas native Lyndon B. Johnson in 1964, which was attributed to the county's large immigrant population and negative perception of Trump by female Republican voters. While Clinton didn't win heavily college-educated suburban counties such as Denton County, Williamson County, Collin County, or Hays County, her margin of defeat was much narrower than other Democratic presidential nominees. Places that had large numbers of young voters in the state were a stronghold for Clinton as well. Texas Lieutenant Governor Dan Patrick suggested that Trump's relatively small margin of victory could have been largely due to many moderate Republican voters who had supported Romney in 2012 staying home. In an interview conducted the morning after the election, Patrick said in reference to these voters, "Had they turned out, he would've been in the low teens".

In total, Clinton beat Trump in 27 counties by a total of 883,819 votes, and had the best percentage performance of any other Democrat running statewide. Conversely, Trump, who won 227 of the state's 254 counties, got the smallest percentage of the vote of all Republicans running in the state. Although, Trump was the first Republican presidential candidate to win Jefferson County since 1972.

As of the 2024 election, this is the most recent election where Frio, Jim Wells, Kenedy, Kleberg, La Salle, Reeves, Val Verde, and Zapata counties have voted Democratic, as rural Hispanic-majority South Texas has trended heavily Republican in the two elections since, and the most recent election where Hays County has voted Republican.

== See also ==
- United States presidential elections in Texas
- First presidency of Donald Trump
- 2016 Democratic Party presidential debates
- 2016 Democratic Party presidential primaries
- 2016 Republican Party presidential debates
- 2016 Republican Party presidential primaries
