= 2016 Green Party presidential primaries =

- February 17 – July 31, 2016

402 delegates to the Green National Convention 202 delegates votes needed to win
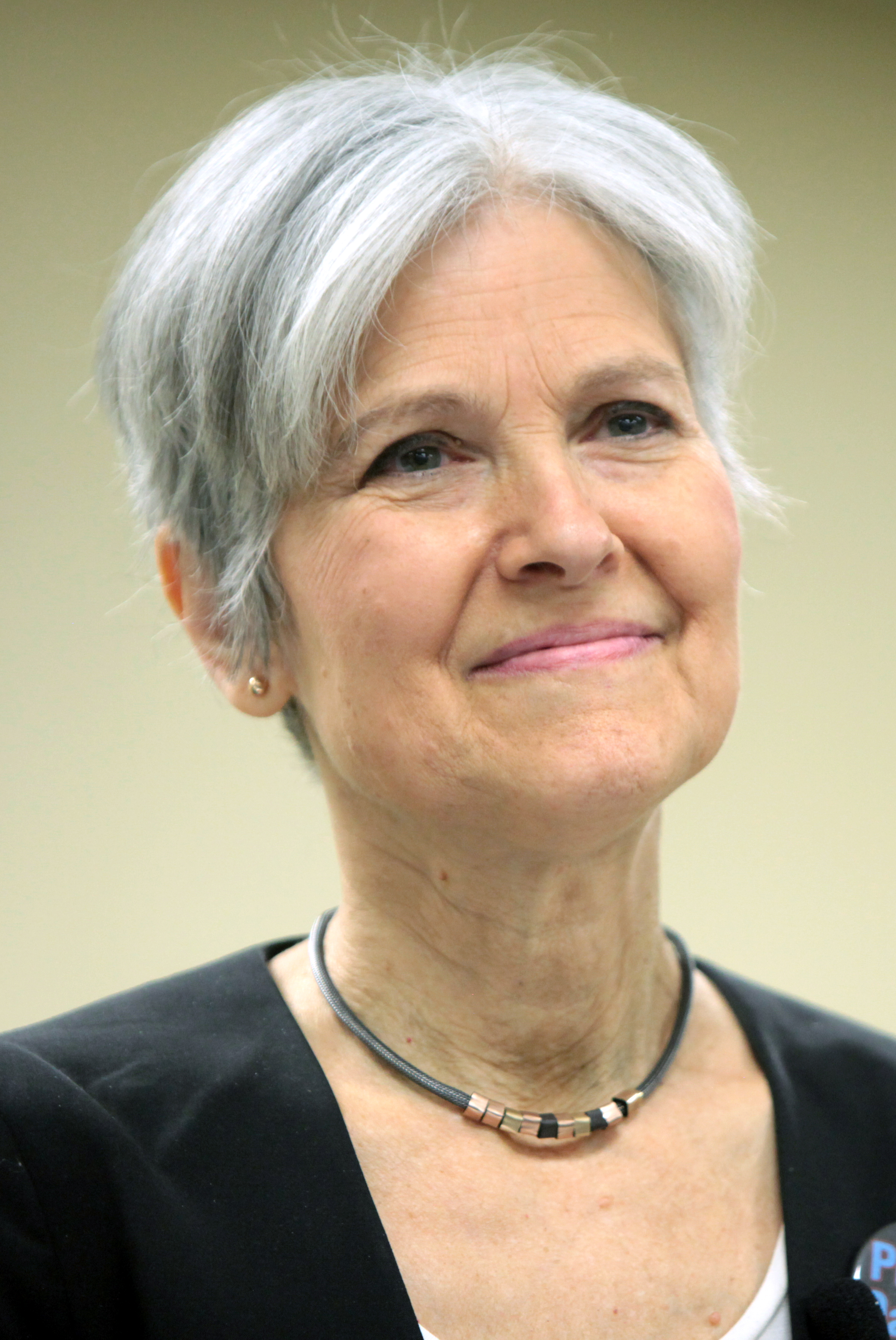

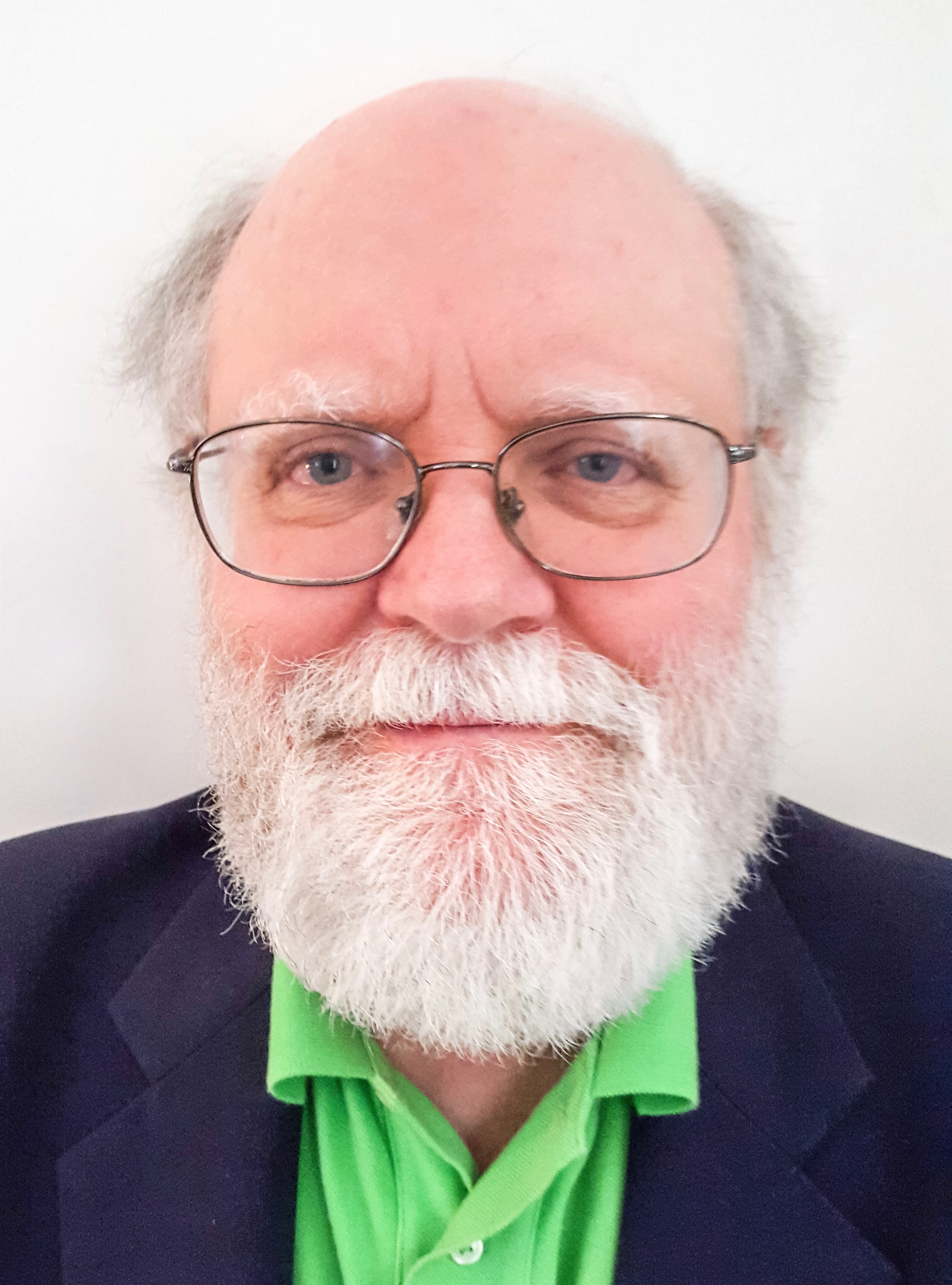
Candidate	Jill Stein	Others / Uncommitted	William Kreml
Home state	Massachusetts		South Carolina
Delegate count	269½	112¼	20¼
Contests won	36	0	1
Popular vote	13,240	3,957	654
Percentage	74.2%	22.1%	3.7%
First place (popular vote or delegate count)
Jill Stein	William Kreml
Previous Green nominee
Jill Stein
Green nominee
Jill Stein

The 2016 Green Party presidential primaries were a series of primaries, caucuses and state conventions in which voters elected delegates to represent a candidate for the Green Party's nominee for President of the United States at the 2016 Green National Convention. The primaries, held in numerous states on various dates from January to July 2016, featured elections publicly funded and held as an alternative ballot, concurrent with the Democratic and Republican primaries, and elections privately funded by the Green Party, held non-concurrently with the major party primaries. Over 400 delegates to the Green National Convention were elected in these primaries, with a candidate needing a simple majority of these delegates to become the party's nominee for president.

A total of six candidates stood in the primaries, including the preceding Green nominee for president in the 2012 presidential election, Jill Stein, who sought the nomination for a second time. Other candidates included Sedinam Moyowasifza-Curry, who had previously worked as a campaign manager for the presidential campaign of the Green Party's 2008 nominee, Cynthia McKinney, in addition to singer-songwriter and Earth First! activist Darryl Cherney, perennial candidate Kent Mesplay, University of South Carolina professor William Kreml, and youth rights activist Elijah Manley.

Formal recognition is a requirement to be the Green Party's nominee. On May 4, the Green Party of the United States formally recognized William Kreml and Jill Stein as candidates for its presidential nomination. On June 15, the Stein campaign announced that it had received 203 delegates, enough to win the nomination on the first ballot at the National Convention. Jill Stein formally won the nomination on August 6, during the 2016 Green National Convention.

As the Green Party presidential candidate in the 2016 United States presidential election Stein received 1,457,222 votes or 1.06% of the popular vote. Stein received zero electoral college votes.

== Background ==
The 2016 United States presidential election was the fourth contested by the Green Party of the United States since they split from the Greens/Green Party USA (G/GPUSA) in 2001. The 2004 presidential election saw Green nominee David Cobb appear on ballots in 27 states plus the District of Columbia, and received 0.10% of the popular vote, losing out to many other candidates and parties on the ballot, including third-placed independent Ralph Nader, who had been the presidential nominee of the G/GPUSA in the 1996 and 2000 elections. In the 2008 election, Cynthia McKinney was nominated as the Green Party's candidate for the presidency and had ballot access to 32 states plus DC. However, McKinney insignificantly improved upon Cobb's performance, capturing only 0.12% of the popular vote in an election that also saw Nader finish a strong third behind the Democratic and Republican parties.

Having received minimal publicity in the previous elections, thus contributing to the low voting share that the party received, the Green Party gained significant exposure and media attention in the lead-up to the 2012 Green National Convention and the 2012 presidential election, starting with media personality Roseanne Barr's announcement of her presidential run with the Green Party. Using the publicity gained from the announcement, Barr praised the Green Party and championed their beliefs through interviews and public statements, which were often profane and harshly critical of both the Democratic and Republican parties. Barr, however, lost the nomination at the 2012 Green National Convention to physician and activist Jill Stein, who had gained the support of Green Party delegates through her "Green New Deal" platform of progressive economic policies centered on the prevention of future financial crisises and the acceleration of global warming. Stein's campaign for the presidency focused mostly on keeping the publicity gained by the Green Party and gaining support from independents and dissenting Democratic and Republican voters, often echoing resentment towards the two parties. This included a court challenge against the Commission on Presidential Debates by Stein that sought to include her in the official presidential election debates. Stein's campaign also gained media attention and exposure through a series of nonviolent protests, including those against the presidential debates, the Keystone XL pipeline, and foreclosures, which had Stein arrested, and even jailed, numerous times.

On election day, Stein oversaw a relatively sharp rise in the Green Party's popularity, earning 0.36% of the popular vote (469,628 votes), across the Green Party's ballot access in 36 states plus DC. The result was triple the amount Cynthia McKinney received in 2008, pushing the Green Party from a lower-tier third party to the second most popular third party, trailing behind the Libertarian Party, who had nominated the popular former Governor of New Mexico Gary Johnson as their presidential candidate, also setting numerous Libertarian Party and presidential third party records. The election also notably made Stein the most successful female presidential candidate in U.S. history, surpassing Lenora Fulani's bid for the presidency in the 1988 election, with the New Alliance Party, who had ballot access in all states plus DC and earned 217,219 votes that year. Despite her success, however, Stein's campaign was criticized by those who felt that she had failed to capitalise on her momentum and gain an even bigger success.

== Candidates ==
The national Green Party of the United States officially recognized two candidates, Jill Stein and William Kreml, while four additional candidates have appeared on several state—or territory—ballots.

Candidate	Most recent position	Campaign	Projected Delegates	Delegations with plurality
Candidates formally recognized by GPUS
Jill Stein	Lexington Town Meeting member (2005–2011)	(Campaign • Endorsements • Website)	269.5 / 402 (67%)	34; AZ, CA, CO, CT, DE, FL, GA, HI IL, IA, LGC, LA, MA, MI, MS, MD, ME, MN, MO, NJ, NM, NY, OH, OR, PA, RI, TN, TX, VA, WA, DC, WV, WI, YGC
Bill Kreml	Distinguished Professor Emeritus, University of South Carolina	Endorsed Jill Stein (Website)	20.25 / 402 (5.05%)	1 SC
Other candidates
Sedinam Moyowasifza-Curry	People's National Convention organizer	(Website)	13 / 402 (3.48%)	None
Elijah Manley	Chapter President of the National Youth Rights Association, Florida State Director of the Alliance Against Corporal Punishment (2015–Present)	Endorsed Jill Stein (Website)	10 / 402 (2.49%)	None
Darryl Cherney	Earth First! organizer (1980–present)	Endorsed Jill Stein (Website)	7 / 402 (2.24%)	None
Kent Mesplay	Inspector at the Air Pollution Control; District of San Diego County (2001–2015)	(Website)	6 / 402 (1.74%)	None
Alternate ballot options
Other or None of the above	N/A		10 / 402 (2.49%)	None

== Debates ==
The Green Party of New Mexico and Students Organizing Action for Peace hosted a debate on April 9 at the University of New Mexico's Student Union Building. The debate was streamed online through Burque Media Productions. All five candidates recognized by the national party were invited.

== Results ==
		Winning			Projected delegates							
Date	State	Candidate	Vote	Percent	Stein	Kreml	Curry	Mesplay	Cherney	Manley	Other	Total
February 17	Illinois	Jill Stein	119	87%	20	1	0	0	0	0	2	23
March 1	Massachusetts	Jill Stein	768	48%	5	0	1	0	0	0	4	10
March 1	Minnesota	Jill Stein	70	84%	4	0	3	0	0	0	0	7
March 19	Maine	Jill Stein	-	-	9	0	1	0	0	0	1	11
March 22	Arizona	Jill Stein	688	79%	5	0	0	1	0	0	0	6
April 2	Delaware	Jill Stein	14	100%	4	0	0	0	0	0	0	4
April 3	Virginia	Jill Stein	35	76%	3	0	0	1	0	0	0	4
April 3	Colorado	Jill Stein	-	-	5	0	0	0	0	0	0	5
April 3	Ohio	Jill Stein	-	61%	6	2	1	0	0	0	0	9
April 5	Young Greens	Jill Stein	66	92%	2	0	0	0	0	0	0	2
April 10	Texas	Jill Stein	-	-	15	1	3	2	2	0	0	23
April 16	Wisconsin	Jill Stein	-	-	7	1	0	0	0	0	0	8
April 17	New Jersey	Jill Stein	-	-	5	0	0	0	0	0	0	5
April 30	Pennsylvania	Jill Stein	50	83%	8	1	0	0	0	0	0	9
April 30	Connecticut	Jill Stein	24	89%	6	0	0	0	0	0	1	7
April 30	Missouri	Jill Stein	-	-	4	0	0	0	0	0	0	4
April 30	New Mexico	Jill Stein	-	-	3	1	0	0	0	0	0	4
April 30	South Carolina	William Kreml	13	56%	3	5	0	0	0	0	0	8
May 15	Washington	Jill Stein	-	-	5	0	0	0	0	0	0	5
May 21	Mississippi	Jill Stein	-	-	4	0	0	0	0	0	0	4
May 21	Oregon	Jill Stein	-	-	6	0	1	0	0	0	1	8
May 21	Rhode Island	Jill Stein	-	-	4	0	0	0	0	0	0	4
May 28	Hawaii	Jill Stein	-	-	3	1	0	0	0	0	0	4
June 4	Georgia	Jill Stein	-	-	3	1	0	0	0	0	0	4
June 4	Tennessee	Jill Stein	-	-	3½	½	0	0	0	0	0	4
June 7	California	Jill Stein	11,206	76%	40	2	3	2	5	0	0	50
June 11	New York	Jill Stein	127	89%	16	1	0	0	0	0	1	18
June 12	Maryland	Jill Stein	51	96%	6	0	0	0	0	0	0	6
June 14	Washington, DC	Jill Stein	-	-	4	¼	0	0	0	0	0	4
June 25	North Carolina	Jill Stein	-	–	4	0	0	0	0	0	0	4
June 26	Nebraska	Jill Stein	-	-	4	0	0	0	0	0	0	4
June 28	Lavender Greens	Jill Stein	-	-	2	0	0	0	0	0	0	2
July 9	Iowa	Jill Stein	-	-	3	1	0	0	0	0	0	4
July 16	West Virginia	Jill Stein	-	-	4	0	0	0	0	0	0	4
July 30	Louisiana	Jill Stein	-	-	4	1	–	–	–	–	-	4
July 31	Michigan	Jill Stein	-	-	15	½	–	–	–	–	-	15
July 31	Florida	Jill Stein	-	58.88%	15	0	0	0	0	10	0	25
-	Other	-	-	-	-	-	-	-	-	-	-	73
Total	United States				269½	20.25	13	6	7	10	10	402

== Map ==

Jill Stein
William Kreml
No contest

== See also ==
- Jill Stein presidential campaign, 2016

National Conventions

- 2016 Green National Convention
- 2016 Libertarian National Convention
- 2016 Republican National Convention
- 2016 Democratic National Convention

Presidential primaries

- Constitution Party presidential primaries, 2016
- Democratic Party presidential primaries, 2016
- Green Party presidential primaries, 2016
- Libertarian Party presidential primaries, 2016
- Republican Party presidential primaries, 2016
