= 2016 Green National Convention =

United States political convention

- 2016 presidential election

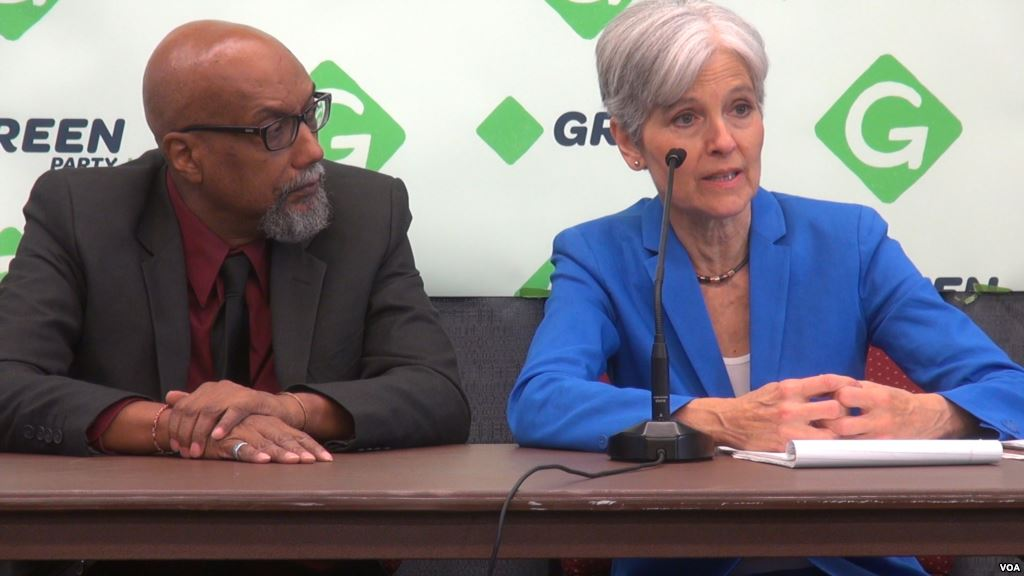
- Stein (right) and Baraka (left) at the convention

Convention
- Date(s): August 4–7, 2016
- City: Houston, Texas
- Venue: University of Houston
- Keynote speaker: Cornel West

Candidates
- Presidential nominee: Jill Stein of Massachusetts
- Vice-presidential nominee: Ajamu Baraka of the District of Columbia
- Other candidates: William Kreml, Sedinam Curry, Kent Mesplay, Darryl Cherney

Voting
- Total delegates: 402
- Votes needed for nomination: 202 (majority)

Sites of the 2016 national presidential nominating conventions. Blue, red, green, and yellow indicate the conventions for the Democratic, Republican, Green, and Libertarian parties, respectively.

The 2016 Green National Convention, in which delegates of the Green Party of the United States chose the party's nominees for president and vice president in the national election, was held August 4–7, 2016 in Houston, Texas. In August 2015, Houston was chosen over a competing proposal from Toledo, Ohio. The convention was located at the University of Houston with the theme, "Houston, We Have A Solution: Vote Green 2016". The convention formally nominated Jill Stein as the party's presidential nominee and Ajamu Baraka as her running mate.

== Speakers ==
Several speakers had been confirmed ahead of time; more were announced closer to the convention

- David Cobb, 2004 Green Party presidential nominee and co-founder of Move to Amend
- Andrea Cuellar, former member of the Denver Public Schools Board of Education
- Bruce Dixon, managing editor of Black Agenda Report
- Lisa Fithian, activist, writer, and organizer for United for Peace and Justice
- Howie Hawkins, Green Party activist and perennial candidate
- YahNé Ndgo, activist, author, and singer
- John Rensenbrink, political scientist and co-founder of the Green Party
- Cornel West, philosopher, academic, social activist, author, member of Democratic Socialists of America, and member of the DNC platform committee
- Keli Yen, Coordinator for Global Greens and former Convenor of the Asia Pacific Greens Federation
- Julian Assange, computer programmer, publisher, journalist, and Editor-in-Chief of WikiLeaks (via video)

== Presidential delegate count ==

Jill Stein
William Kreml
No contest

Green National Convention Presidential Roll call vote, 2016
Candidate	First Ballot	Percentage
Jill Stein	233.5	81.64%
William Kreml	18.25	6.38%
Sedinam Curry	14.5	5.07%
Darryl Cherney	8.5	2.97%
Kent Mesplay	7.5	2.62%
Elijah Manley	3.25	1.14%
No candidate	0.5	0.17%
Totals	286	100%
Turnout	286	71.14%

== Vice presidential selection ==
Jill Stein began taking part in the 2016 Green Party presidential primaries in February 2016. Stein was immediately the front-runner and was described by the media as "steamrolling to victory." On June 15, 2016, the Stein campaign announced that it had received 203 delegates, enough to win the nomination on the first ballot at the 2016 Green National Convention. A week before the start of the convention, former Ohio State Senator Nina Turner, who served as a surrogate for Senator Bernie Sanders during his campaign, announced that she had been in discussions with the Stein campaign about possibly serving as Stein's vice presidential pick. The following day, Stein stated that the campaign hadn't chosen a VP candidate yet, and was in discussion with several individuals. On August 1, the Stein campaign announced that Ajamu Baraka had been chosen as Stein's VP candidate. Stein released the names of the final six individuals she had considered as her running mate, with Baraka being the choice. The six contenders for Stein's running mate were:

- Ajamu Baraka, founding executive director of the US Human Rights Network and associate fellow at the Institute for Policy Studies
- Aaron Dixon, former captain of the Seattle chapter of the Black Panther Party
- Dr. Margaret Flowers, former pediatrician, radio host, healthcare activist, and candidate for the United States Senate election in Maryland, 2016
- Chris Hedges, Pulitzer Prize-winning journalist and author
- Nina Turner, former Ohio State Senator
- Kevin Zeese, former executive director of National Organization for the Reform of Marijuana Laws

== See also ==
- Green Party of the United States
- Green Party presidential primaries, 2016
- Green National Convention
- Other parties' presidential nominating conventions in 2016:
  - Democratic
  - Libertarian
  - Republican
