= Howie Hawkins 2020 presidential campaign =

American political campaign

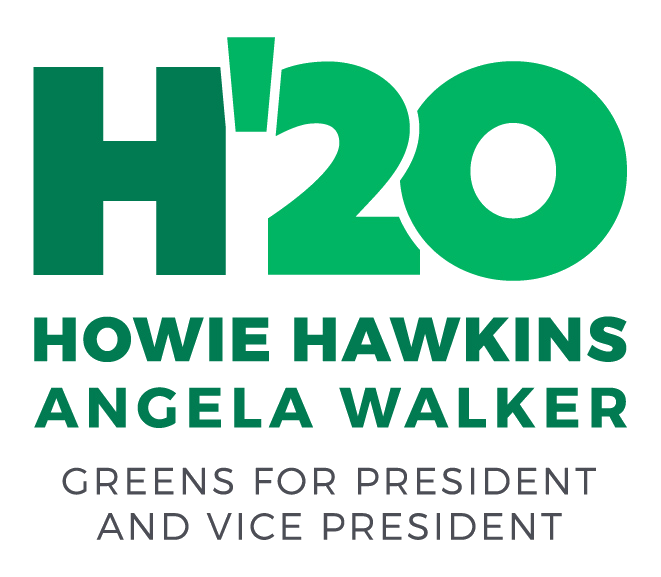
- Campaign: 2020 presidential election (Green primaries)
- Candidate: Howie Hawkins; Co-founder of the Green Party; Angela Walker; 2016 Socialist Party USA vice-presidential nominee
- Affiliation: Green Party; Legal Marijuana Now (Note: The Legal Marijuana Now Party originally nominated Mark Elsworth and later Rudy Reyes for president but later decided to nominate Hawkins.); Socialist Party USA; Socialist Alternative
- Status: Formed exploratory committee: April 3, 2019; Announced: May 28, 2019; Official Socialist nominee: October 26, 2019; Official Green nominee: July 11, 2020; Lost election: November 7, 2020
- Headquarters: Syracuse, New York
- Receipts: US$463,084.18 (October 31, 2020)
- Slogan: For an Ecosocialist Green New Deal

Website
- howiehawkins.us

The 2020 presidential campaign of Howie Hawkins, both the co-founder of the Green Party of the United States and thrice its gubernatorial candidate in New York, was informally launched on April 3, 2019, when Hawkins announced the formation of an exploratory committee and formally announced his campaign on May 28, 2019, to seek the Green Party nomination for the presidency of the United States in the 2020 presidential election and later the Socialist Party USA. On May 5, 2020, Hawkins announced that former Socialist Party USA vice presidential candidate Angela Nicole Walker would be his running mate. Hawkins and Walker were nominated by the Green Party on July 11, 2020.

Hawkins also sought the nomination of the various state-based left-wing parties, including the Peace and Freedom Party, Legal Marijuana Now Party, Oregon Progressive Party, United Citizens Party, Liberty Union Party, and Vermont Progressive Party.

== Background ==
In the 1980s, Hawkins joined the green movement. In 1988, Howie and Murray Bookchin founded the Left Green Network "as a radical alternative to U.S. Green liberals", based around the principles of social ecology and libertarian municipalism. In the early 1990s a press conference was held in Washington, D.C., that featured Charles Betz, Joni Whitmore, Hilda Mason, and Howie Hawkins to announce the formation of the Greens/Green Party USA. Later in December 1999, Mike Feinstein and Hawkins wrote the Plan for a Single National Green Party which was the plan to organize the ASGP and GPUSA into a single Green Party. Over the next decade he would run in multiple New York Senate and House races.

In the 2010 New York gubernatorial election Hawkins surpassed the 50,000-vote requirement to stay on the ballot in the gubernatorial election. In the 2014 election, he received enough to move the Green Party line to Row D on the ballot as he had taken one-third more than the Working Families Party and twice as much as the Independence Party. In the 2018 election, Hawkins received 80,000 fewer votes than he did in his 2014 run. As a result, the party was lowered one row down to Row E, but retained ballot access.

In 2012, Hawkins was approached over the possibility of running for the Green Party presidential nomination. He declined due to his employment commitments at UPS, which he maintained would interfere with a national campaign.

Following his retirement from UPS, Hawkins was approached again to run by a draft movement via a public letter addressed to him. The letter was signed by former Green vice presidential nominees Cheri Honkala and Ajamu Baraka, former Green mayoral candidate and Nader's 2008 running mate Matt Gonzalez, and other prominent Green Party members.

== Campaign ==
On April 3, 2019, Hawkins announced that he was forming an exploratory committee to prepare for a potential candidacy for the Green Party 2020 presidential nomination and formally launched his campaign on May 28, 2019, in Brooklyn, New York. On June 21, 2020, Hawkins received enough delegates to win the Green Party's presidential nomination after winning delegates from the Green Party of Michigan and Lavender Caucus. On July 11, he received the Green Party's presidential nomination with 210 delegates at the party's virtual convention.

On October 26, 2019, Hawkins won the nomination of the Socialist Party USA as part of his effort to unite smaller left-wing parties. In November, Hawkins was endorsed by Solidarity, a U.S.-based socialist organization. On March 3, 2020, Hawkins lost the Peace and Freedom Party primary to Gloria La Riva. On August 13, 2020, he was endorsed by Socialist Alternative. Hawkins also received the nomination of the Legal Marijuana Now Party. In August 2020, Solidarity withdrew their endorsement following a poll of its members, instead taking no official position on the presidential election.

A September 2020 New York Times article highlighted how Republican operatives worked to get the Green Party on presidential ballot lines in swing states by collecting signatures and advising on ballot access lawsuits, hoping that it would split votes away from Biden.

=== Ballot access ===
	Electoral votes	2020	2016	2012	2008^{A}	2004^{A}	2000^{B}
States (& DC)	51	29 (17)	45 (48)	37 (44)	32 (48)	25 (43)	44 (48)
Electoral votes	538	381 (514)	480 (522)	439 (489)	368 (528)	267 (479)	481 (513)
Percent of EVs	100%	? (?)	89.2% (97.0%)	81.6% (90.9%)	71.0% (96.2%)	49.6% (89.0%)	89.4% (95.4%)
Alabama	9	(write-in)	On ballot	On ballot	(write-in)	(write-in)	On ballot
Alaska	3	(write-in)	On ballot	On ballot	(write-in)	On ballot	On ballot
Arizona	11	(write-in)	On ballot	On ballot	On ballot	(write-in)	On ballot
Arkansas	6	On ballot	On ballot	On ballot	On ballot	On ballot	On ballot
California	55	On ballot	On ballot	On ballot	On ballot	On ballot	On ballot
Colorado	9	On ballot	On ballot	On ballot	On ballot	On ballot	On ballot
Connecticut	7	On ballot	On ballot	(write-in)	(write-in)	On ballot	On ballot
Delaware	3	On ballot	On ballot	On ballot	On ballot	On ballot	On ballot
Florida	29	On ballot	On ballot	On ballot	On ballot	On ballot	On ballot
Georgia	16	(write-in	(write-in)	(write-in)	(write-in)	(write-in)	(write-in)
Hawaii	4	On ballot	On ballot	On ballot	On ballot	On ballot	On ballot
Idaho	4	(write-in)	On ballot	On ballot	(write-in)	(write-in)	(write-in)
Illinois	20	On ballot	On ballot	On ballot	On ballot	(write-in)	On ballot
Indiana	11	(write-in)	(write-in)	(write-in)	(write-in)	(write-in)	(write-in)
Iowa	6	On ballot	On ballot	On ballot	On ballot	On ballot	On ballot
Kansas	6	(write-in)	On ballot	(write-in)	(write-in)	(write-in)	On ballot
Kentucky	8	(write-in)	On ballot	On ballot	(write-in)		On ballot
Louisiana	8		On ballot	On ballot	On ballot	On ballot	On ballot
Maine	4	On ballot	On ballot	On ballot	On ballot	On ballot	On ballot
Maryland	10	On ballot	On ballot	On ballot	On ballot	On ballot	On ballot
Massachusetts	11	On ballot	On ballot	On ballot	On ballot		On ballot
Michigan	16	On ballot	On ballot	On ballot	On ballot	On ballot	On ballot
Minnesota	10	On ballot	On ballot	On ballot	On ballot	On ballot	On ballot
Mississippi	6	On ballot	On ballot	On ballot	On ballot	On ballot	On ballot
Missouri	10	On ballot	On ballot		(write-in)		On ballot
Montana	3		On ballot		(write-in)	On ballot	On ballot
Nebraska	5	(write-in)	On ballot		On ballot	On ballot	On ballot
Nevada	6			On ballot	On ballot		On ballot
New Hampshire	4	(write-in)	On ballot	(write-in)	(write-in)	(write-in)	On ballot
New Jersey	14	On ballot	On ballot	On ballot	On ballot	On ballot	On ballot
New Mexico	5	On ballot	On ballot	On ballot	On ballot	On ballot	On ballot
New York	29	On ballot	On ballot	On ballot	On ballot	(write-in)	On ballot
North Carolina	15	On ballot	(write-in)	(write-in)	(write-in)	(write-in)	
North Dakota	3	(write-in)	On ballot	On ballot	(write-in)		On ballot
Ohio	18	On ballot	On ballot	On ballot	On ballot	(write-in)	On ballot
Oklahoma	7						
Oregon	7	On ballot	On ballot	On ballot	On ballot	On ballot	On ballot
Pennsylvania	20	(write-in)	On ballot	On ballot	(write-in)	On ballot	On ballot
Rhode Island	4	(write-in)	On ballot	On ballot	On ballot	On ballot	On ballot
South Carolina	9	On ballot	On ballot	On ballot	On ballot	On ballot	On ballot
South Dakota	3						
Tennessee	11	On ballot	On ballot	On ballot	On ballot	(write-in)	On ballot
Texas	38	On ballot	On ballot	On ballot	(write-in)	(write-in)	On ballot
Utah	6	On ballot	On ballot	On ballot	On ballot	(write-in)	On ballot
Vermont	3	On ballot	On ballot	(write-in)	(write-in)	(write-in)	On ballot
Virginia	13	(write-in)	On ballot	On ballot	On ballot	(write-in)	On ballot
Washington	12	On ballot	On ballot	On ballot	On ballot	On ballot	On ballot
West Virginia	5	On ballot	On ballot	On ballot	On ballot	(write-in)	On ballot
Wisconsin	10	(write-in)	On ballot	On ballot	On ballot	On ballot	On ballot
Wyoming	3	(write-in)	On ballot	(write-in)	(write-in)	(write-in)	(write-in)
District of Columbia	3	On ballot	On ballot	On ballot	On ballot	(write-in)	On ballot

A. Based on 2004 - 2008 electoral college apportionment
B. Based on 1992 - 2000 electoral college apportionment

Total electoral vote eligibility: 514 (Note: The Alaska Green Party instead nominated Jesse Ventura for president with Cynthia McKinney as his running mate.) On ballot (29 states + DC, 381 electoral votes) Write-in (17 states, 133 electoral votes) Not on ballot

On July 15, Hawkins sued Oklahoma over its $35,000 filing fee for president. On September 1, the Green Party of Alaska nominated Jesse Ventura for president and Cynthia McKinney for vice president instead of Hawkins and Walker. Hawkins appeared in the ballot in thirty states.

==== Rhode Island ====
On May 28, 2020, the Green Party of Rhode Island announced that it would not place a presidential candidate onto the ballot for the first time since 1996 citing the danger of Donald Trump winning reelection. Hawkins later announced that he would petition as an independent candidate under the partisan label "Independent Left" in Rhode Island. However, Hawkins failed to qualify for the Rhode Island ballot after submitting only 897 valid signatures in his petition to run for office.

==== Pennsylvania ====
A challenge was filed against Hawkins in Pennsylvania stating that the Green Party's stand-in candidates for president and vice president had not submitted a declaration of candidacy. On September 9, Judge J. Andrew Crompton rejected a challenge to Hawkins being on the ballot in Pennsylvania although the challenge against Walker being on the ballot was accepted. Crompton ruled that Hawkins should appear on the ballot as the stand-in presidential candidate did submit a declaration of candidacy while the stand-in vice-presidential candidate had not.

On September 10, the Pennsylvania Democratic Party appealed to the Supreme Court of Pennsylvania to remove Hawkins from the ballot. The Supreme Court of Pennsylvania ordered election officials to not print ballots until the court made a decision on whether or not Hawkins would appear on the ballot. On September 17, the Pennsylvania Supreme Court ruled five to two in favor of removing Hawkins from the ballot. All five Democratic members of the Pennsylvania Supreme Court voted to remove Hawkins while both Republican members voted to keep him on the ballot.

==== Wisconsin ====
Hawkins' presidential petition in Wisconsin was challenged in August under the basis that Walker had changed her residence address within South Carolina. On August 19, the staff of the Wisconsin Elections Commission recommended that Hawkins be removed from the ballot due to his petitions not having enough signatures when the signatures for the out-of-date postal address for Walker were removed. On August 20, the commission voted three to three to remove Hawkins from the ballot; all of the Democratic members of the commission voted to remove Hawkins while the Republican members voted to keep him on the ballot.

On September 3, Hawkins filed a lawsuit to the Wisconsin Supreme Court. On September 10, the Wisconsin Supreme Court ordered election officials to stop mailing out ballots until the court ruled on whether or not Hawkins and/or Kanye West could appear on the ballot. The Wisconsin Supreme Court ruled four to three in favor of the election commission on September 14, citing that Hawkins had waited too long to file a lawsuit and that it would cause too much disruption to place his name on the ballot.

== Campaign finance ==
On August 23, 2019, the Hawkins campaign announced they had met the requisite federal matching funds for California and New York. Only his campaign and that of Steve Bullock applied for primary season matching funds. On July 9, 2020, the Hawkins campaign announced they achieved federal matching fund requirements in 20 necessary states, claiming they had raised $220,000 from 4,000 donors in over 7,000 total contributions.

== Political positions ==
=== Climate change ===
Hawkins supported the Green Party's version of the Green New Deal that would serve as a transitional plan to the exclusive use of renewable energy by 2030 utilizing a carbon tax, jobs guarantee, free college, single-payer healthcare and a focus on using public programs.

He was a critic of the Democratic version of the Green New Deal written by Alexandria Ocasio-Cortez, stating that "unfortunately, they took the brand but watered down the content".

=== Democratic Party reform ===
Hawkins disagreed with the "party-within-the-party" approach to the Democratic Party advocated by organizations such as the Democratic Socialists of America or by individuals such as Bernie Sanders. Instead, he believed that socialists should build up an independent Left party.

=== Participatory democracy ===
Hawkins advocated for expansion of town meetings, expanding their powers to enact legislation and granting them the power to recall representatives.

=== Medicare for All ===
Hawkins viewed health care as a human right and a public good. His plan is to implement a single-payer National Health Insurance in which health care facilities are publicly owned, healthcare workers are salaried, and the system is governed by community boards elected by the public (two-thirds of the seats) and health care workers (one-third of the seats).

The system would be funded by allocating current public healthcare dollars (about 70% of current spending) to the system. The rest of the funding would come from progressive taxes on individuals/families, both earned and unearned income, who earn more than 150% of the adjusted Federal Poverty Level and on large corporations.

== Endorsements ==
=== Local officials ===
==== Former ====
- Matt Gonzalez, President of San Francisco Board of Supervisors (2003–2005), San Francisco Supervisor (2001–2005), Ralph Nader's running mate for vice president in 2008 United States presidential election

=== Party officials ===
- Margaret Flowers, co-chair of the Green Party of the United States 2018–present; adviser to the board of Physicians for a National Health Program; medical doctor

=== Notable individuals ===
- Ajamu Baraka, national organizer for Black Alliance for Peace, Green nominee for vice president in 2016
- Chris Hedges, author, recipient of the Pulitzer Prize for Explanatory Reporting in 2002, former New York Times Middle East bureau chief
- Cheri Honkala, founder of Poor People's Economic Human Rights Campaign, Green nominee for vice president in 2012
- Paul Le Blanc, historian, labor activist
- Richard Stallman, programmer, software freedom activist, founder of FSF and GNU Project
- Bhaskar Sunkara, publisher of Jacobin
- Kevin Zeese, lawyer, political activist, Green nominee for U.S. Senate from Maryland in 2006 (former press secretary for Howie Hawkins 2020) (deceased)

=== Organizations ===
==== Activist groups ====
- StudentLoanJustice.org
- Workers' Liberty

==== National political parties and organizations ====
- Independent Socialist Group
- Legal Marijuana Now Party (received party's nomination)
- Socialist Alternative (received party's endorsement)
- Solidarity

==== State political parties ====
- Arizona Green Party
- Connecticut Green Party
- Green Party of Arkansas
- Green Party of Florida
- Green Party of Hawaii
- Green Party of Mississippi
- Green Party of Montana
- Green Party of New Jersey
- Green Party of New Mexico
- Green Party of New York
- Green Party of Ohio
- Green Party of Pennsylvania
- Green Party of Virginia
- Green Party of Washington State
- Green-Rainbow Party
- Kansas Green Party
- Maine Green Independent Party
- Maryland Green Party
- Mountain Party
- North Carolina Green Party
- Pacific Green Party
- Socialist Party of New Jersey
- Socialist Party of New York
- South Carolina Green Party
- Vermont Green Party

== Controversies ==
=== Allegations of irregularities in the Green Party primary ===
On October 16, 2019, a joint candidate letter called for reform in the party's primary process in response to the party's announcement that it would remove unrecognized candidates from its website list that November, an effort which the other Green candidates claimed was being done to help Hawkins secure its nomination. This was followed by allegations of conflicts of interest among the party's leadership, who the candidates believed where helping party co-founder Hawkins, and an alleged overlooking of a violation of Green Party rules regarding Hawkins’ campaign for the Socialist Party's nomination.

After the 2020 Green Party Nominating Convention named Hawkins as their presidential candidate, candidate Dario Hunter announced via Twitter that he would continue to pursue the presidency as an independent candidate. Hunter cited alleged irregularities and undemocratic processes throughout the Green Party presidential primary, stating that party leaders had committed “ethical lapses” to ensure Hawkins nomination, and criticizing Hawkins for what he saw as his "imperialist perspective" and "CIA talking points.”

=== Dispute with Gloria La Riva ===
On February 20, 2020, Hawkins published a statement critical of his opponent in the Peace and Freedom Party nomination primary, Gloria La Riva, alleging that she supported "a 'safe strategy' of supporting Bernie Sanders in the 'battleground' states" and stating "you didn't join the Peace and Freedom Party to support Democrats." LaRiva responded stating that it was "not an honest critique" and "[f]or Hawkins to further imply that he is the stronger supporter of Peace and Freedom is not convincing." LaRiva won the Peace and Freedom Party's only primary contest in California, receiving 67% to Hawkins' 33%.
