= Busboys and Poets =

Restaurant chain in Washington, D.C., area

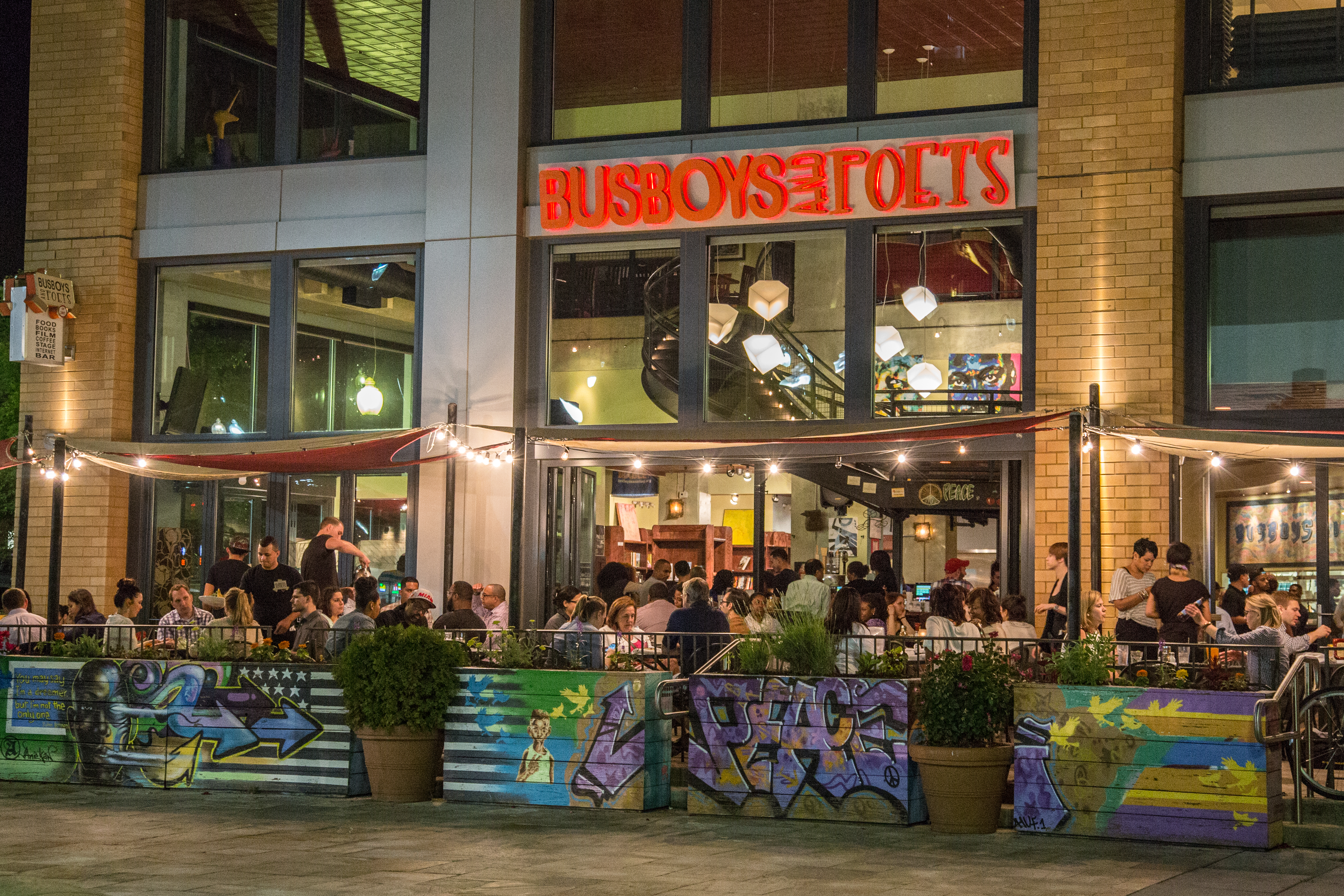
- View of Busboys and Poets' exterior seating
- Interactive map of Busboys and Poets

Restaurant information
- Established: September 7, 2005; 21 years ago
- Owner: Anas "Andy" Shallal
- Food type: American
- Dress code: Casual
- Location: Washington, D.C., United States
- Coordinates: 38°55′4.5″N 77°1′54″W
- Other locations: Mount Vernon Triangle at 5th & K; Shirlington, Virginia; Hyattsville, Maryland; Brookland (Washington, D.C.); Takoma (Washington, D.C.); Anacostia
- Website: https://www.busboysandpoets.com/

Busboys and Poets is a full-service restaurant, bar, bookstore, coffee shop, and events venue in the Washington, D.C. area, founded in 2005 by Andy Shallal. The original Busboys and Poets is located at 14th & V streets in the U Street Corridor of Washington, D.C. There are now eight locations in the DMV: a second location opened in Shirlington, Virginia, in 2007; a third location opened in DC's Mount Vernon Triangle neighborhood in 2008; a fourth in Hyattsville, Maryland, opened in July 2011; a fifth opened in the Takoma neighborhood on Valentine's Day in 2015; a sixth at D.C.'s Brookland neighborhood opened on New Year's Eve in 2016; a seventh location opened in D.C.'s Anacostia neighborhood in early 2019; and an eighth location opened in Columbia, Maryland, in late 2021. A further location is planned for Reagan National Airport.

It has been described as a haven for writers, thinkers and performers from America's progressive social and political movements.

== Establishment ==
Exterior of the Shirlington location, 2008

Locations in the Washington, DC metropolitan area

The first Busboys and Poets lies two blocks from U Street, a commercial corridor in Northwest Washington, known as "Black Broadway" in its heyday. Concerned that his creation of a trendy artistic space would clash with U Street's traditional identity, Shallal reached out for support from community leaders, neighborhood groups, church organizations, schools and radio stations prior to opening the location. Shallal obtained a loan from black-owned Industrial Bank, located at 11th and U streets. The name refers to American poet Langston Hughes, who worked as a busboy at the Wardman Park Hotel in the 1930s, prior to gaining recognition as a poet. Rejected ideas for the restaurant's name include Writers Block Cafe, Broken Bread Cafe and White Rabbit Cafe, the latter inspired by The Matrix.

Shallal painted the giant civil rights movement-themed mural covering one wall of the restaurant, titled Peace in Struggle Wall. He refuses to sign the mural, saying this would be a "final gesture" that would preclude him from making revisions later. The collage depicts civil rights icons including the Rev. Martin Luther King Jr. and Nelson Mandela. It features the words of Langston Hughes, "Let America be America again / Let it be the dream it used to be."

== Reception ==
Shallal had said he would keep Busboys running even if it just broke even, but it proved a success from the beginning, even without committing an advertising budget. C-SPAN, NBC News and ABC's Good Morning America all filmed segments inside the restaurant within the restaurant's first few months. Kevin Zeese, spokesperson for Ralph Nader's 2004 presidential campaign and director of Democracy Rising, related to The Hill, "Boom! It just became an incredibly important landmark for the community. It definitely has a progressive feel to it; it's in the 'hood, not disjointed from the community like the National Press Club and Capitol Hill are." Shallal said of the restaurant's popularity, "I've opened many restaurants, [but] this is the first time that people came in and got it right away."

The Busboys clientele has included Alice Walker, Angela Davis, Danny Glover, Cheryl Strayed, Amy Goodman, singer Nick Jonas, Common, Cindy Sheehan, Tom Hayden, Harry Belafonte, Amiri Baraka, Rep. Maxine Waters, Rep. Lynn Woolsey, Rep. Sheila Jackson-Lee, Anthony Shadid and Dave Meggyesy, a former St. Louis Cardinals linebacker who quit the NFL in protest of the Vietnam War. Additionally, onetime Washington Wizards center Etan Thomas has performed his poetry at Busboys. Minnesota Senator, Al Franken spoke in Busboys and Poets' Langston Room, Howard Zinn, House Speaker Nancy Pelosi and her daughter, actor Matt Dillon, modern hip hop artist Keri Hilson and others have either eaten or hosted an event.
