= Chris Van Hollen =

American lawyer and politician (born 1959)

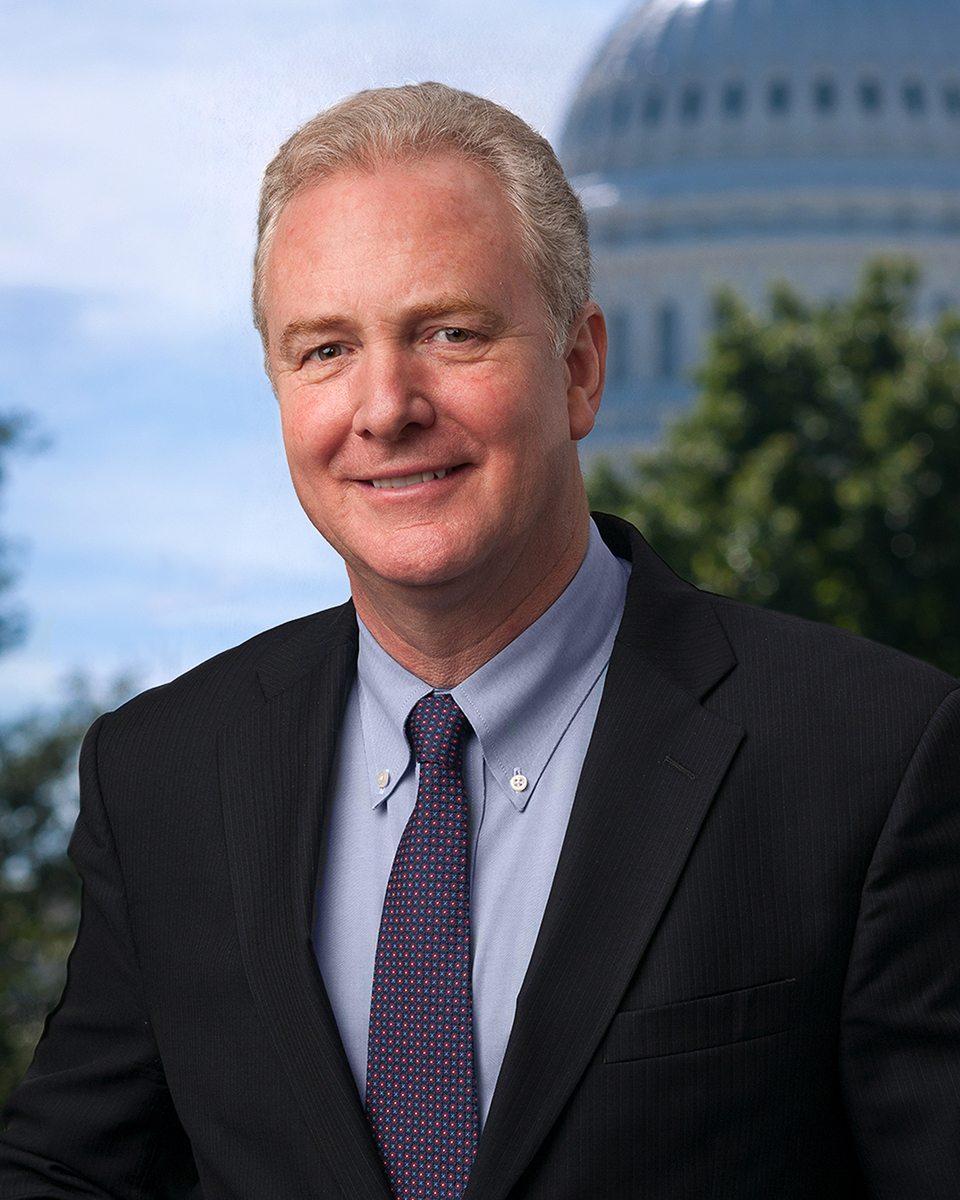
- Official portrait, 2017

United States Senator from Maryland
- Incumbent
- Assumed office January 3, 2017 Serving with Angela Alsobrooks
- Preceded by: Barbara Mikulski

Chair of the Democratic Senatorial Campaign Committee
- In office January 3, 2017 – January 3, 2019
- Leader: Chuck Schumer
- Preceded by: Jon Tester
- Succeeded by: Catherine Cortez Masto

House Democratic Assistant to the Leader
- In office January 3, 2009 – January 3, 2011
- Leader: Nancy Pelosi
- Preceded by: Xavier Becerra
- Succeeded by: Jim Clyburn (Assistant Democratic Leader)

Chair of the Democratic Congressional Campaign Committee
- In office January 3, 2007 – January 3, 2011
- Leader: Nancy Pelosi
- Preceded by: Rahm Emanuel
- Succeeded by: Steve Israel

Member of the U.S. House of Representatives from Maryland's 8th district
- In office January 3, 2003 – January 3, 2017
- Preceded by: Connie Morella
- Succeeded by: Jamie Raskin

Member of the Maryland Senate from the 18th district
- In office January 11, 1995 – January 8, 2003
- Preceded by: Patricia Sher
- Succeeded by: Sharon Grosfeld

Member of the Maryland House of Delegates from the 18th district
- In office January 9, 1991 – January 11, 1995
- Preceded by: Patricia Sher; Lawrence Wiser
- Succeeded by: Sharon Grosfeld

Personal details
- Born: Christopher Van Hollen Jr. January 10, 1959 (age 67) Karachi, Pakistan
- Party: Democratic
- Spouse: Katherine Wilkens (m. 1987)
- Children: 3
- Parent: Christopher Van Hollen Sr. (father)
- Education: Swarthmore College (BA); Harvard University (MPP); Georgetown University (JD)
- Website: Senate website Campaign website
- Van Hollen's voice Van Hollen questioning witnesses on housing supply shortages. Recorded August 2, 2022

Christopher Van Hollen Jr. (/væn ˈhɒlən/ van HOL-ən; born January 10, 1959) is an American attorney and politician serving as the senior United States senator from Maryland, a seat he has held since 2017. A member of the Democratic Party, he served as the U.S. representative for Maryland's 8th congressional district from 2003 to 2017 and as a Maryland state senator from 1995 to 2003. He is challenging Chuck Schumer in the 2026 Senate Democratic Caucus leadership election.

In 2007, Van Hollen became the chair of the Democratic Congressional Campaign Committee (DCCC). In this post, he was responsible for leading efforts to defend vulnerable Democrats and get more Democrats elected to Congress in 2008, which led to a wave election for Democrats. House Speaker Nancy Pelosi created a new leadership post, Assistant to the Speaker, in 2006 so that Van Hollen could be present at all leadership meetings. He was elected ranking member on the Budget Committee on November 17, 2010. Pelosi appointed Van Hollen to the 12-member bipartisan Committee on Deficit Reduction with a mandate for finding major budget reductions by late 2011. On October 17, 2013, Pelosi appointed Van Hollen to serve on the bicameral conference committee.

Van Hollen ran for the United States Senate in 2016 to replace retiring Senator Barbara Mikulski. He defeated U.S. Representative Donna Edwards in the Democratic primary and won the general election with 61% of the vote to Republican nominee Kathy Szeliga's 36%. He was reelected in 2022 with nearly 66% of the vote to Republican nominee Chris Chaffee's 34%. Van Hollen chaired the Democratic Senatorial Campaign Committee (DSCC) from 2017 to 2019. Van Hollen became Maryland's senior senator when Ben Cardin retired from the Senate in 2025. Van Hollen is set to become the dean of Maryland's congressional delegation in 2027, as longtime Representative Steny Hoyer has announced his retirement.

== Early life, education, and career ==
Van Hollen was born in Karachi, Pakistan, the eldest of three children of American parents, Edith Eliza (née Farnsworth) and Christopher Van Hollen. His father was a Foreign Service officer who served as deputy assistant secretary of state for Near Eastern Affairs (1969–1972) and U.S. ambassador to Sri Lanka and the Maldives (1972–1976); his mother worked in the Central Intelligence Agency and the State Department, where she served as chief of the intelligence bureau for South Asia. He spent parts of his early life in Pakistan, Turkey, India, and Sri Lanka. In 1971 his father disagreed with Henry Kissinger on the Nixon administration's support for Pakistan when it committed the Bangladesh genocide during its civil war. He returned to the United States for his junior year of high school, and attended Middlesex School in Concord, Massachusetts, where his grandfather had once taught.

He is an alumnus of the Kodaikanal International School (in Dindigul district, Tamil Nadu, India). In 1982, Van Hollen graduated from Swarthmore College with a Bachelor of Arts in philosophy. He continued his studies at Harvard University, where he earned a Master of Public Policy concentrating in national security studies from the John F. Kennedy School of Government in 1985. He then earned a Juris Doctor from the Georgetown University Law Center in 1990.

== Early political career ==
Van Hollen worked as a legislative assistant for defense and foreign policy to U.S. Senator Charles Mathias, a Republican from Maryland, from 1985 to 1987. He was also a staff member of the U.S. Senate Committee on Foreign Relations (1987–1989), and a legislative advisor for federal affairs to Maryland governor William Donald Schaefer (1989–1991). He was admitted to the Maryland bar in 1990, and joined the law firm of Arent Fox.

== Maryland State Legislature (1991–2003) ==
Van Hollen served in the Maryland General Assembly from 1991 to 2003, first in the House of Delegates (1991–1995) and then in the State Senate (1995–2003). In the Senate, he served on the Budget and Taxation Committee and the Health and Human Services Subcommittee. He led successful efforts to raise the tobacco tax, prohibit oil drilling in the Chesapeake Bay, mandate trigger locks for guns, and increase funding for education and healthcare. In 2002, The Washington Post called Van Hollen "one of the most accomplished members of the General Assembly".

== U.S. House of Representatives (2003–2017) ==
=== Elections ===
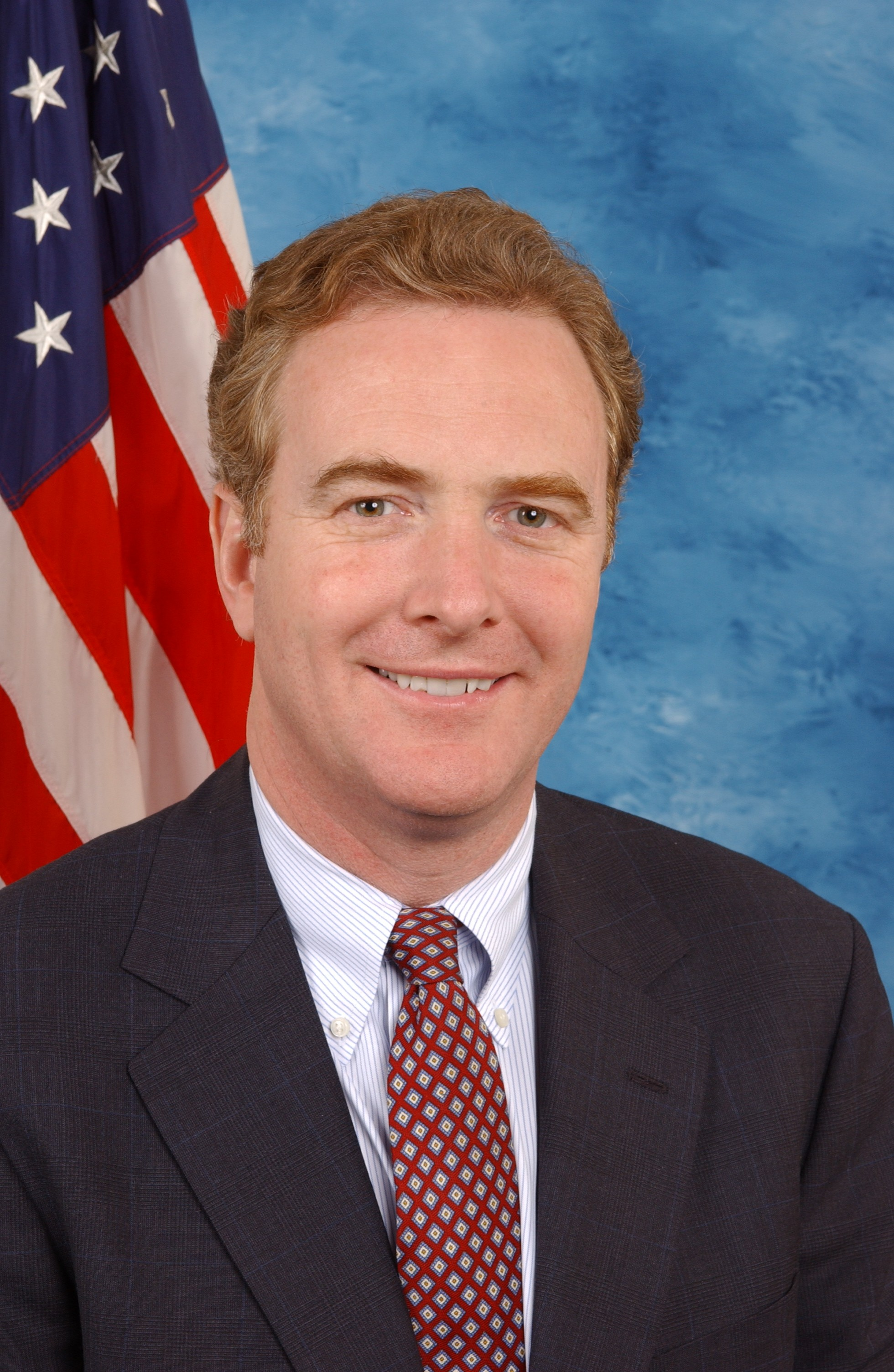
Van Hollen's official congressional portrait, c. 2003

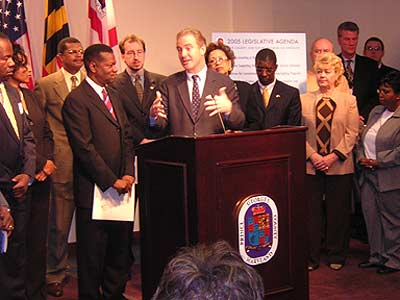
Chris Van Hollen joining Prince George's County Executive Jack B. Johnson (at the podium and to the left of Van Hollen) for the announcement of the county's legislative agenda for 2005

Before Van Hollen's election, incumbent Connie Morella had won eight elections in the district, despite being a Republican in a district that had swung heavily Democratic. Morella's success was largely attributed to her political independence and relatively liberal voting record, including support for abortion rights, gay rights, gun control, and increased environmental protections.

After Morella's reelection in 2000, Democratic Maryland Senate President Thomas V. Miller, Jr. made no secret that he wanted to draw the 8th out from under Morella. Indeed, one redistricting plan after the 2000 census divided the 8th in two, giving one district to Van Hollen and forcing Morella to run against popular State Delegate Mark Kennedy Shriver. The final plan was far less ambitious, but made the district even more Democratic than its predecessor. It absorbed nine heavily Democratic precincts from neighboring Prince George's County, an area Morella had never represented. It also restored a heavily Democratic spur in eastern Montgomery County that had been cut out in the last round of redistricting. Van Hollen defeated Morella in the 2002 general election in part, according to some analysts, because of this redistricting.

In 2002, Van Hollen entered a competitive Democratic primary against Shriver and former Clinton administration aide Ira Shapiro. Though Shriver had the most money, Van Hollen launched a grassroots effort that mobilized Democratic voters. After receiving the endorsement of The Washington Post, The Baltimore Sun, and other local papers, Van Hollen defeated Shriver, 43.5% to 40.6%.

During the campaign, Van Hollen emphasized that even when Morella voted with the district, her partisan affiliation kept Tom DeLay and the rest of her party's more conservative leadership in power. Van Hollen also touted his leadership in the State Senate on issues such as education funding, HMO reform, trigger locks for handguns, and protecting the Chesapeake Bay from oil drilling. Van Hollen defeated Morella, 51.7% to 48.2%. He crushed Morella in Prince George's County while narrowly winning Montgomery County. Morella won most of the precincts she had previously represented.

Van Hollen never faced another contest nearly that close, and was reelected six times with at least 60% of the vote. After the 2010 census, his district was made slightly less Democratic. He lost a heavily Democratic spur of Montgomery County to the neighboring 6th district, and lost his share of Prince George's County to the 4th district. In their place, the 8th absorbed a strongly Republican spur of Frederick County, as well as the southern part of even more Republican Carroll County. Nonetheless, his share of Montgomery County had more than double the population of his shares of Carroll and Frederick Counties combined, and Van Hollen won a sixth term over Republican Ken Timmerman with 63% of the vote. He lost in Carroll and Frederick, but swamped Timmerman in Montgomery by 130,406 votes.

=== Tenure ===
In 2003, the Committee for Education Funding, a nonpartisan education coalition founded in 1969, named Van Hollen its Outstanding New Member of the Year. The first bill Van Hollen introduces every session is the Keep Our Promise to America's Children and Teachers (Keep Our PACT) Act, which would fully fund No Child Left Behind and Individuals with Disabilities Education Act. He introduced an amendment, which passed, that repealed a 9.5 percent loophole in student loans that had allowed lenders to pocket billions of taxpayer dollars. Now, that money is available for additional student loans.

Because many federal employees live in his district, Van Hollen has worked on a number of issues relating to them. He supported pay parity in pay raises for civilian employees and introduced an amendment, which passed, to block attempts to outsource federal jobs.

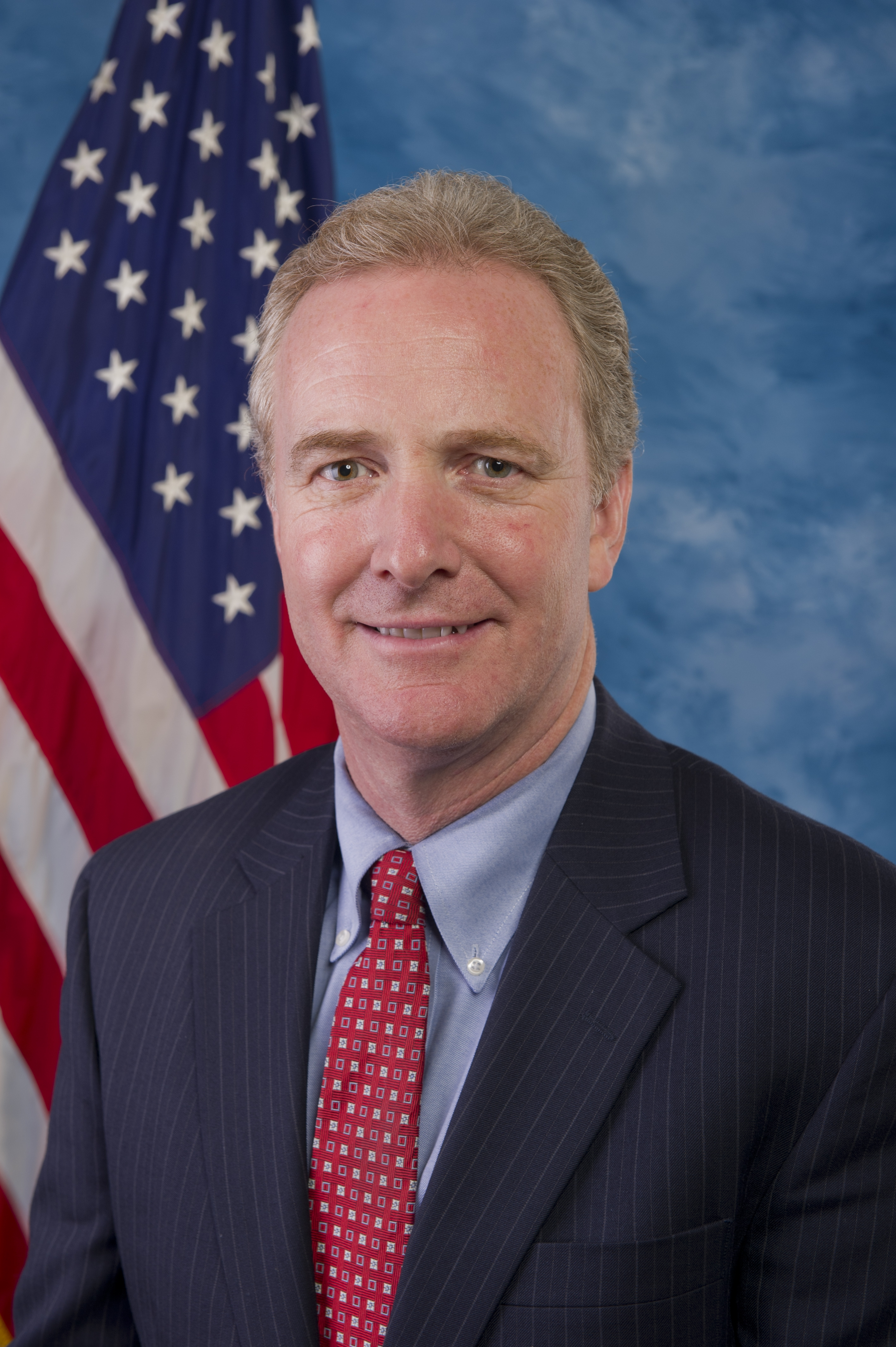
Official portrait, c. 2011

Van Hollen has secured federal funding for a number of local-interest projects, including transportation initiatives, local homeland security efforts, education programs and community development projects. Van Hollen included a provision in legislation governing Washington Metro to prevent housing development in Takoma Park. He and Adam Schiff (D-CA) often discuss issues of National Security on the floor of the House in tandem, with particular commentary on the wars in Afghanistan and Iraq.

In May 2006, Van Hollen formed a congressional caucus on the Netherlands with Dutch-born Republican U.S. Representative Pete Hoekstra from Michigan. The goal of the caucus is to promote the U.S. relationship with the Netherlands and remember the Dutch role in establishing the State of New York and the United States.

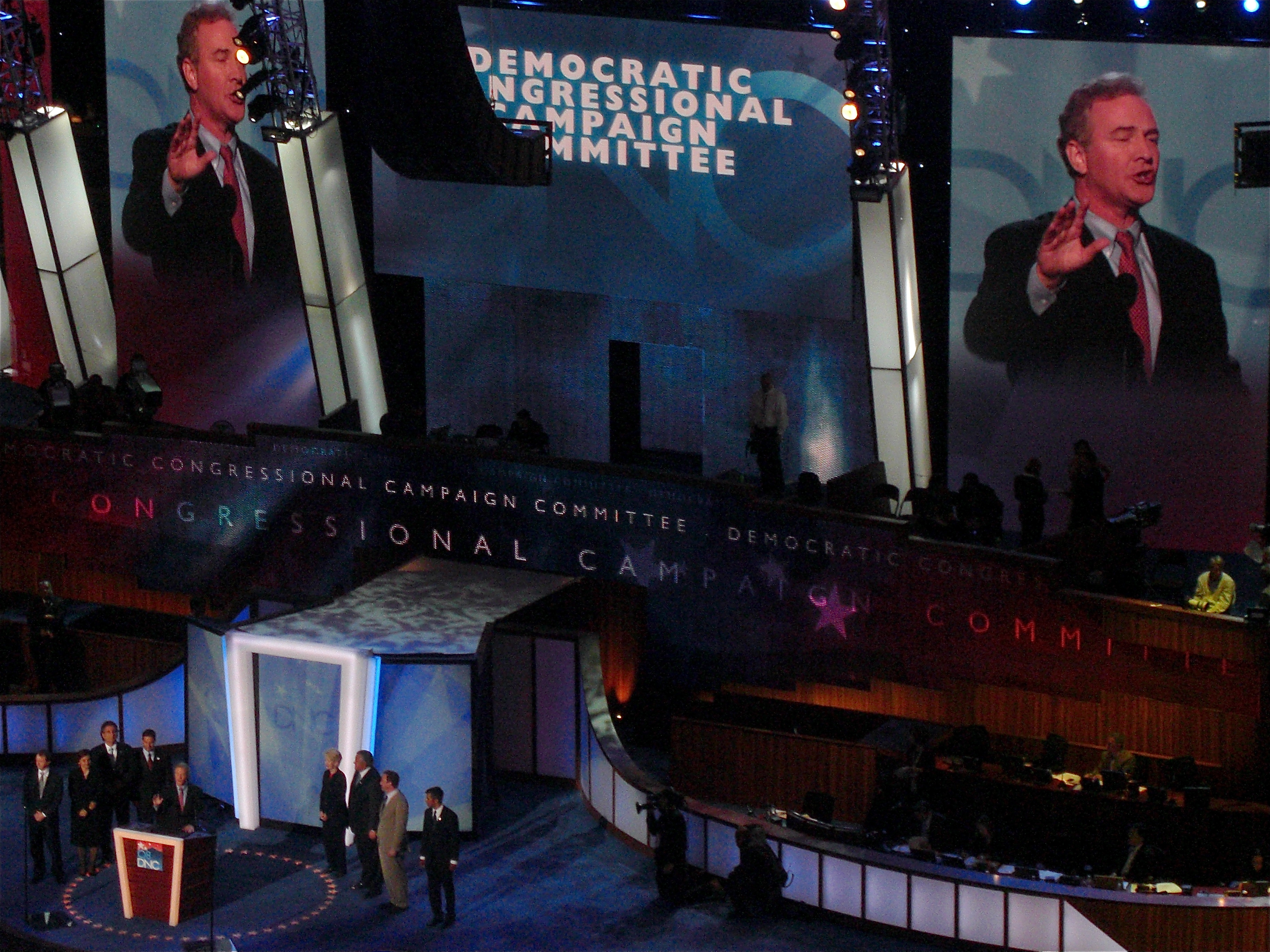
Van Hollen speaking during the second day of the 2008 Democratic National Convention in Denver, Colorado, in his capacity as chairman of the Democratic Congressional Campaign Committee. He is flanked by Democratic House challengers.

In July 2006, Van Hollen urged the Bush administration to support a ceasefire supported by a peacekeeping force that would end the 2006 Lebanon War. He was criticized by elements of the Jewish and pro-Israel community, a large part of his constituency, for criticizing U.S. and Israeli policy in the Lebanon conflict. In follow-up comments, Van Hollen indicated that his original comments were meant as a critique of Bush administration policy but did not retract his position, and other members of the local Jewish and pro-Israel community defended him.

In 2006, Van Hollen opted out of the race to succeed the retiring Senator Paul Sarbanes, saying he would rather spend time with his family and help elect more Democrats to Congress. In keeping with that, Van Hollen was appointed to Chairman of the Democratic Congressional Campaign Committee.

In 2009, Van Hollen introduced a bill which establishes a green bank to catalyze the financing of renewable energy and energy efficiency projects. He reintroduced the same bill again in 2014.

In March 2010, when Charles Rangel was forced to resign as Chairman of the Committee on Ways and Means over ethics charges, Van Hollen played a key role in having Sander Levin succeed to the Chairmanship over Pete Stark. Stark was the second-most experienced member of the committee while Levin was third, and party tradition would have made Stark chairman due to seniority. However, Van Hollen and other younger members saw Stark's past intemperate comments as a liability to the Democrats in an election year.

On April 29, 2010, Van Hollen introduced the campaign finance DISCLOSE Act. He reintroduced the bill for the 113th Congress on February 9, 2012.

In April 2011, Van Hollen sued the Federal Election Commission, charging it with regulatory capture and the creation of a loophole that allowed unlimited and undisclosed financing in the 2010 election season. According to Van Hollen, had it not been for the loophole, "much of the more than $135 million in secret contributions that funded expenditures would have been disclosed."

During the 2012 Obama reelection campaign, Van Hollen participated in one-on-one debate prep with vice president Joe Biden, impersonating the Republican vice-presidential candidate Paul Ryan.

In 2014, Van Hollen worked with a bipartisan group to pass the ABLE (Achieving a Better Life Experience) Act. The legislation allowed people with disabilities to create tax-free savings accounts for qualified disability-related expenses (including education, housing, and transportation). The act was signed into law on December 19, 2014.

=== Party leadership and caucus memberships ===
- Ranking Member on the House Budget Committee
- Vice Chairman of the Renewable Energy and Energy Efficiency Caucus
- Co-chairman of the Congressional Soccer Caucus
- Co-chairman of the Chesapeake Bay Watershed Task Force
- Co-chairman of the Congressional Caucus on Global Road Safety
- Vice Chairman of the Democratic Task Force on Budget and Tax Policy
- Member of the Congressional Asian Pacific American Caucus
- Member of the Sustainable Energy and Environment Coalition
- International Conservation Caucus
- Congressional Chesapeake Bay Watershed Caucus
- Chairman, Congressional Down Syndrome Caucus
- Afterschool Caucuses
- Black Maternal Health Caucus
- Congressional Coalition on Adoption
- Senate Taiwan Caucus
- Rare Disease Caucus

== U.S. Senate (2017–present) ==
=== Elections ===
==== 2016 ====
Van Hollen defeated Republican Kathy Szeliga in the general election, 61% to 36%. He replaced Democrat Barbara Mikulski, who had retired from the Senate after serving for 30 years.

==== 2022 ====
Van Hollen was reelected to a second term in 2022, defeating Republican Chris Chaffee with 65.8% of the vote to Chaffee's 34.1%.

=== Tenure ===
==== 115th Congress (2017–2019) ====
Shortly after the 2016 elections, Van Hollen was selected as the Chairman of the Democratic Senatorial Campaign Committee (DSCC) for the 2018 cycle. While part of a congressional delegation visiting India in 2019, Van Hollen requested the Indian government's permission to travel to Jammu and Kashmir to observe the conditions of the lockdown. His request was denied.

==== 117th Congress (2021–2023) ====
Chris Van Hollen giving his Electoral College count remarks, including his response to the January 6 United States Capitol attack

Van Hollen was walking to the Senate chambers to speak during the 2021 United States Electoral College vote count when he was stopped by U.S. Capitol Police telling him that the building was on lockdown due to the attack on the Capitol. He returned to his office, where he remained for the duration of the attack. In the immediate wake of the insurrection, Van Hollen called Trump a "political arsonist" and said "I never thought we would live to see the day that violent mobs seized control of the Capitol. I cry for our country." As Van Hollen waited for the Capitol to be secured, he said he wanted an immediate investigation, calling the perpetrators "a violent mob". He also contrasted the police's treatment of the rioters with events that led to the use of tear gas on peaceful demonstrators, such as Black Lives Matter protests. After Congress returned to session to count the electoral votes, he voted against objections raised by some Republican senators. Van Hollen also called for Trump's "immediate removal" via the Twenty-fifth Amendment to the United States Constitution and said, "we should have looked at that option much earlier."

==== 119th Congress (2025–2027) ====
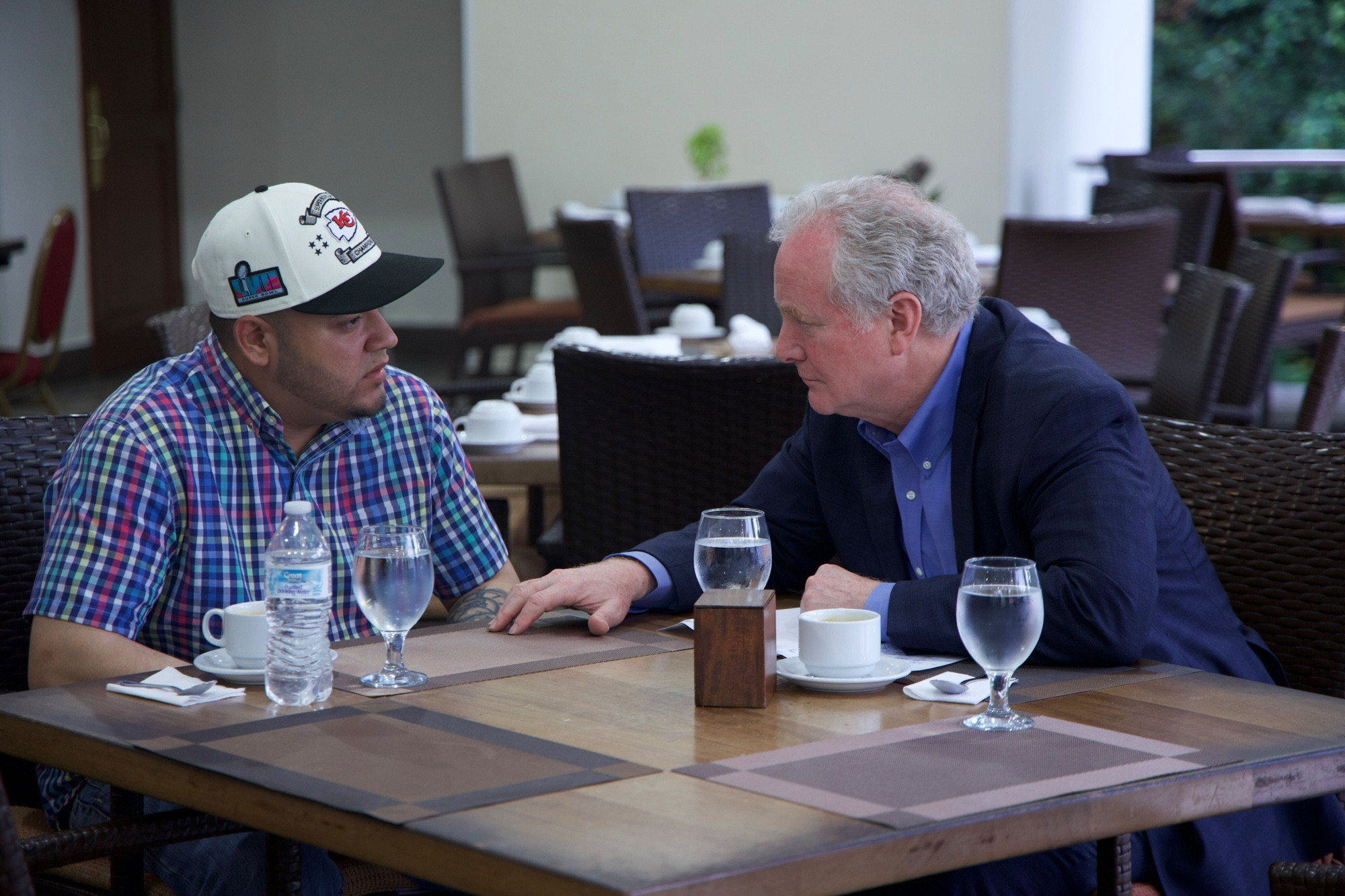
Van Hollen meets with Abrego Garcia in April 2025.

In April 2025, Van Hollen traveled to El Salvador, advocating the release of Maryland resident Kilmar Abrego Garcia. On April 16, he met with the Salvadoran vice president Félix Ulloa, who denied him visitation access to CECOT and refused to authorize a call between him and Abrego Garcia. On April 17, Van Hollen was denied entry into CECOT after he was stopped at a checkpoint under orders to not allow him to proceed. A delegation of five House Republicans, including Ways and Means Committee Chair Jason Smith, had been given a tour of the prison two days earlier. When Secretary of State Marco Rubio testified before the Senate Foreign Relations Committee on May 20, 2025, Van Hollen told him that he regretted voting to confirm him.

External video
- Sen. Van Hollen Tells Secretary Rubio He Regrets Voting to Confirm Him, May 20, 2025, 10:59, C-SPAN

In July 2025, Van Hollen led a call by 29 Senate Democrats asking Rubio to investigate the killing of Palestinian Americans in the West Bank. In August 2025, he visited the West Bank, Jerusalem, and the Egypt–Gaza border with Oregon senator Jeff Merkley and reported their conclusion that Israel was carrying out an "ethnic cleansing" campaign in the territory.

Van Hollen is a member of the Fight Club in the U.S. Senate.

==== 120th Congress (2027–present) ====
On November 12, 2026, after the Senate elections the previous week, Van Hollen announced that he would run against Chuck Schumer for Senate Majority Leader. Of the Senate Democratic caucus, only Abdul El-Sayed, Peggy Flanagan, Jeff Merkley, Bernie Sanders, and Elissa Slotkin have publicly announced support for him, but Van Hollen has said that more than 15 members support him privately.

=== Committee assignments ===
==== Current ====
- Committee on Appropriations
  - Subcommittee on Commerce, Justice, Science, and Related Agencies
  - Subcommittee on Financial Services and General Government (chair)
  - Subcommittee on Interior, Environment, and Related Agencies
  - Subcommittee on State, Foreign Operations, and Related Programs
  - Subcommittee on Transportation, Housing and Urban Development, and Related Agencies
- Committee on Banking, Housing, and Urban Affairs
  - Subcommittee on Housing, Transportation, and Community Development
  - Subcommittee on Financial Institutions and Consumer Protection
  - Subcommittee on Securities, Insurance, and Investment
- Committee on Foreign Relations
- Committee on the Budget

==== Previous ====
- Committee on Environment and Public Works (2017–2021)
- Committee on Agriculture (2017)

=== Caucus memberships ===
- Foreign Service Caucus (co-chair)
- Congressional NextGen 9-1-1 Caucus
- Expand Social Security Caucus

== Political positions ==
In the leadup to the 2026 Senate Democratic Caucus leadership election, multiple news outlets labeled Van Hollen a progressive. The Washington Post has described Van Hollen as a politician "once part of the Democratic establishment" who has emerged as a "progressive favorite" during the second Trump administration.

=== Conservation ===
In 2023, Van Hollen received a 100% score from the League of Conservation Voters.

=== Economy ===
According to his campaign website, Van Hollen supports an increase in the minimum wage, paid sick leave, an expansion of the earned income tax credit, equal pay for women, an increase in the child care tax credit, and a financial transaction tax.

=== Elections ===
In October 2018, Van Hollen and Susan Collins cosponsored the Protect Our Elections Act, a bill that would block "any persons from foreign adversaries from owning or having control over vendors administering U.S. elections" and would make companies involved in administering elections reveal foreign owners and inform local, state and federal authorities if said ownership changes. Companies failing to comply would face fines of $100,000.

=== Foreign policy ===
==== Israel–Palestine ====
In May 2020, Van Hollen voiced his opposition to Israel's plan to annex parts of the Israeli-occupied West Bank.

In January 2024, during the Gaza war, Van Hollen voted for a resolution proposed by Senator Bernie Sanders to apply the Foreign Assistance Act's human rights provisions to U.S. aid to Israel's military. The proposal was defeated, 72 to 11. After the Israeli military shot and killed an American activist in the West Bank in 2024, Van Hollen urged the Biden administration to hold Israel accountable for its actions, saying "If the Netanyahu government will not pursue justice for Americans, the Department of Justice must". In November 2024, Van Hollen criticized Biden for what he saw as Biden's "inaction" in holding Israel accountable for not letting aid into Gaza, calling Biden's conduct "weak" and "shameful". In April 2025, Van Hollen voted for a pair of resolutions Sanders proposed to cancel the Trump administration's sales of $8.8 billion in bombs and other munitions to Israel. The proposals were defeated, 82 to 15.

In July 2025, Van Hollen called for an end to funding the Gaza Humanitarian Foundation for its role in mass killings in the Gaza Strip and a restoration of funding for UNRWA. In September 2026, he introduced Senate Resolution 852, which would require the State Department to report on Israel's human rights practices and violence in the West Bank, citing the killings of nine Americans by Israelis in the West Bank. The resolution failed to pass by a vote of 47 to 51.

==== Sudanese civil war ====
In 2024, Van Hollen led legislative efforts to impose a targeted arms embargo on the United Arab Emirates (UAE) due to its alleged support for the Rapid Support Forces (RSF) in the Sudanese Civil War. As of November 2026, the bill was pending.

=== Gun control ===
Van Hollen has been endorsed by the Brady Campaign to Prevent Gun Violence, a group that lobbies for more regulation of guns. In September 2008, he voted against repealing parts of the Washington, D.C., firearm ban. He supports a national assault weapon ban.

In 2015, Van Hollen introduced legislation for increased handgun licensing, specifically the requirement for permit-to-purchase licenses. The proposal was based on a similar law in Maryland. Of his proposal, Van Hollen said, "States require licenses to drive a car or even to fish in local rivers, so requiring a license to buy a deadly handgun is a commonsense step that could save countless lives."

In response to the 2017 Las Vegas shooting, Van Hollen co-sponsored a bill to ban bump stocks.

=== Health ===
Van Hollen supports the Patient Protection and Affordable Care Act (also known as Obamacare) and has defended it many times. He is pro-choice and was an original co-sponsor of the Women's Health Protection Act of 2021. In December 2025, Van Hollen expressed his support for Medicare for All.

=== Journalism ===
In July 2019, Van Hollen cosponsored the Fallen Journalists Memorial Act, a bill introduced by Ben Cardin and Rob Portman that would create a privately funded memorial to be constructed on federal lands in Washington, D.C. to honor journalists, photographers, and broadcasters who died in the line of duty.

=== LGBTQ rights ===
Van Hollen signed a letter in July 2017 in opposition to an announced military ban against transgender soldiers. In November 2022, Van Hollen voted in favor of the Respect for Marriage Act, modifying existing legal definitions of marriage to include same-sex and interracial couples. In October 2024, Van Hollen voted against the National Defense Authorization Act for Fiscal Year 2025 as amended, which restricted gender-affirming care in the military. The bill was later signed by Joe Biden.

=== Taxes ===
In 2010, Van Hollen received a 0% rating from Citizens Against Government Waste (CAGW) and the National Taxpayers Union (NTU). Both organizations advocate lower taxes for everyone, including the wealthy. In 2006, Van Hollen received a 100% rating from Citizens for Tax Justice (CTJ), a group that calls for higher taxes on the wealthy. Van Hollen opposes eliminating the federal estate tax.

== Personal life ==
Van Hollen and his wife Katherine have three children. Van Hollen is of Dutch descent and is Episcopalian.

On May 15, 2022, Van Hollen announced that he had a minor stroke over that weekend and would stay at George Washington University Hospital for a few days. He further said he was expected to make a full recovery with no long-term effects and would return to his work in the Senate later in the week.

== Electoral history ==
Maryland's 8th congressional district election, 2002
Party	Candidate	Votes	%
Democratic	Chris Van Hollen	112,788	51.74
Republican	Connie Morella (incumbent)	103,587	47.52
Write-in		1,599	0.73
Total votes		217,974	100.00
Democratic gain from Republican			

Maryland's 8th congressional district election, 2004
Party	Candidate	Votes	%
Democratic	Chris Van Hollen (incumbent)	215,129	74.91
Republican	Chuck Floyd	71,989	25.07
Write-in		79	0.03
Total votes		287,197	100.00
Democratic hold			

Maryland's 8th congressional district election, 2006
Party	Candidate	Votes	%
Democratic	Chris Van Hollen (incumbent)	168,872	76.52
Republican	Jeffrey M. Stein	48,324	21.90
Green	Gerard P. Giblin	3,298	1.49
Write-in		191	0.09
Total votes		220,685	100.00
Democratic hold			

Maryland's 8th congressional district election, 2008
Party	Candidate	Votes	%
Democratic	Chris Van Hollen (incumbent)	229,740	75.08
Republican	Steve Hudson	66,351	21.68
Green	Gordon Clark	6,828	2.23
Libertarian	Ian Thomas	2,562	0.84
Write-in		533	0.17
Total votes		306,014	100.00
Democratic hold			

Maryland's 8th congressional district election, 2010
Party	Candidate	Votes	%
Democratic	Chris Van Hollen (incumbent)	153,613	73.27
Republican	Michael Lee Philips	52,421	25.00
Libertarian	Mark Grannis	2,713	1.29
Constitution	Fred Nordhorn	696	0.33
Write-in		224	0.11
Total votes		209,667	100.00
Democratic hold			

Maryland's 8th congressional district election, 2012
Party	Candidate	Votes	%
Democratic	Chris Van Hollen (incumbent)	217,531	63.37
Republican	Kenneth R. Timmerman	113,033	32.93
Libertarian	Mark Grannis	7,235	2.11
Green	George Gluck	5,064	1.48
Write-in		393	0.11
Total votes		343,256	100.00
Democratic hold			

Maryland's 8th congressional district election, 2014
Party	Candidate	Votes	%
Democratic	Chris Van Hollen (incumbent)	136,722	60.74
Republican	Dave Wallace	87,859	39.03
Write-in		516	0.23
Total votes		225,097	100.00
Democratic hold			

United States Senate Democratic primary results in Maryland, 2016
Party	Candidate	Votes	%
Democratic	Chris Van Hollen	470,320	53.18
Democratic	Donna Edwards	343,620	38.86
Democratic	Freddie Dickson	14,856	1.68
Democratic	Theresa Scaldaferri	13,178	1.49
Democratic	Violet Staley	10,244	1.16
Democratic	Lih Young	8,561	0.96
Democratic	Charles Smith	7,912	0.89
Democratic	Ralph Jaffe	7,161	0.81
Democratic	Blaine Taylor	5,932	0.67
Democratic	Ed Tinus	2,560	0.29
Total votes		884,344	100.00%

United States Senate election in Maryland, 2016
Party	Candidate	Votes	%	±%
Democratic	Chris Van Hollen	1,659,907	60.89	−1.30
Republican	Kathy Szeliga	972,557	35.67	−0.08
Green	Margaret Flowers	89,970	3.30	+2.17
Write-in		3,736	0.14	+0.03
Total votes		2,726,170	100.00	N/A
Democratic hold				

United States Senate election in Maryland, 2022
Party	Candidate	Votes	%	±%
Democratic	Chris Van Hollen (incumbent)	1,316,897	65.7	+4.88
Republican	Chris Chaffee	682,293	34.0	−1.60
Write-in		3,146	0.16	+0.02
Total votes		2,002,336	100.00	N/A
Democratic hold				

== See also ==
- List of United States senators born outside the United States

U.S. House of Representatives
Preceded by Connie Morella	Member of the U.S. House of Representatives from Maryland's 8th congressional district 2003–2017	Succeeded by Jamie Raskin
Preceded by Paul Ryan	Ranking Member of the House Budget Committee; 2011–2017	Succeeded by John Yarmuth
Party political offices
Preceded by Rahm Emanuel	Chair of the Democratic Congressional Campaign Committee; 2007–2011	Succeeded by Steve Israel
Preceded by Xavier Becerra	House Democratic Assistant to the Leader; 2009–2011	Succeeded by Jim Clyburn as House Assistant Democratic Leader
Preceded by Barbara Mikulski	Democratic nominee for U.S. Senator from Maryland (Class 3); 2016, 2022	Most recent
Preceded by Jon Tester	Chair of the Democratic Senatorial Campaign Committee; 2017–2019	Succeeded by Catherine Cortez Masto
U.S. Senate
Preceded by Barbara Mikulski	U.S. Senator (Class 3) from Maryland; 2017–present Served alongside: Ben Cardin, Angela Alsobrooks	Incumbent
U.S. order of precedence (ceremonial)
Preceded by Dan Sullivan	Order of precedence of the United States as United States Senator	Succeeded by Maggie Hassan
Preceded by Dan Sullivan	United States senators by seniority 56th	Succeeded by Todd Young
