= Andy Shallal =

Iraqi-American businessman, artist and activist

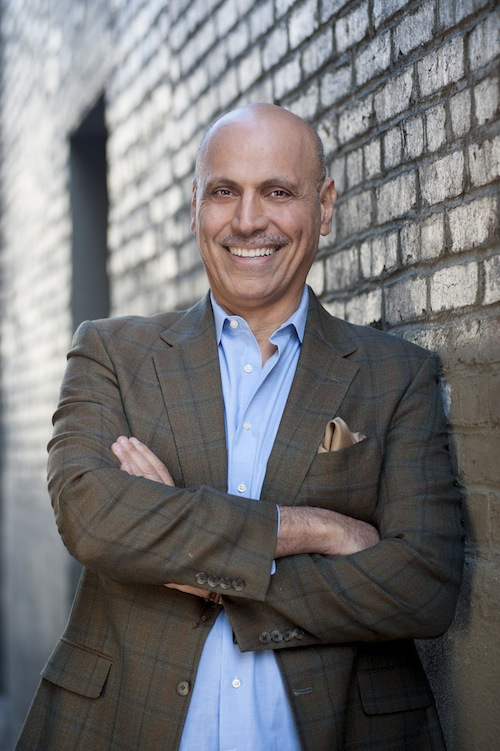
- Born: March 21, 1955 (age 71); Baghdad, Iraq
- Education: Catholic University of America; Howard University College of Medicine; University of Maryland, College Park
- Occupations: Artist; activist; philanthropist; entrepreneur
- Known for: Founding Busboys and Poets
- Political party: Democratic

Anas "Andy" Shallal (Arabic: أنس شلال) (born March 21, 1955) is an Iraqi-American artist, activist, philanthropist and entrepreneur. He is best known as the founder and CEO of the Washington, D.C., area restaurant, bookstore, and performance venue Busboys and Poets. He is also known for his opposition to the 2003 invasion of Iraq. He was a candidate for the city's mayoral election in 2014.

== Early life ==
Shallal moved to the United States with his family in 1966. His father was Ambassador of the Arab League, a position he held until Saddam Hussein seized power, after which they could not return. He graduated from Catholic University of America and later enrolled in Howard University medical school. Shallal earned his MBA from the Robert H. Smith School of Business at the University of Maryland. Shallal worked as a researcher in medical immunology at the National Institutes of Health.

=== Busboys and Poets ===
In September 2005, he opened Busboys and Poets (a phrase from the works of poet Langston Hughes) at 14th and V, in the historic U Street neighborhood. The restaurant features a bookstore, performance space and a mural painted by Shallal. The restaurant was an instant success, embraced by the neighborhood and the progressive community, especially among activists opposed to the Iraq War.

There are seven locations in the Washington, D.C., area. Shallal opened a second Busboys location in Arlington in July 2007, and a third location in D.C. at 5th & K NW in 2008. A fourth location opened in Hyattsville, Maryland, in summer 2011. In 2014 Busboys and Poets opened in Brookland. In 2015 Busboys and Poets opened in Takoma. The seventh location opened in Anacostia in Southeast, D.C.

In 2017, Andy Shallal closed his stores for one day in solidarity with Day Without Immigrants.

=== Peace Ball ===
Shallal is the founder of the Peace Ball inaugural balls. The 2017 Peace Ball took place at the National Museum of African American History and Culture.

Shallal spoke about the significance of the recently opened museum. He included in the evening's program a poem from Langston Hughes.

=== Eatonville ===
Eatonville was a Southern-inspired restaurant that opened in 2009 and closed in 2015. It was located across the street from the Busboys and Poets restaurant in U Street Corridor, Washington, DC. Placing an emphasis on history and culture, the restaurant was named after and takes its concept from Eatonville, the hometown of Zora Neale Hurston, an American folklorist and author during the time of the Harlem Renaissance.

==== Background ====
Shallal always wanted to use Hurston as an inspiration for the restaurant. In 2007, while talking about his plans for the restaurant, Shallal said: "I'd like to incorporate Zora Neale Hurston into the name. I like taking literary [authors] and using them as springboards." He chose her because had studied the Harlem Renaissance during college, and wanted to use someone who lived during that period and had a connection to Washington. Eatonville pays homage to Hurston through the murals, which were painted by a local artist. Shallal said she "was the life of the party, so I wanted the space to look lively and gregarious. And she wrote a lot about the porch at Eatonville where the townspeople tell stories, so we put in an area [with rocking chairs] for people to have drinks." According to Shallal, Carla Hall from Top Chef judged a "reality TV-style contest" to select Eatonville Restaurant's chef.

Amy Cavanaugh in the Decider: DC writes "With this spring's opening of Eatonville, his Zora Neale Hurston-themed restaurant, Andy Shallal is trying to mend a decades-old literary rift between the author and her contemporary, Langston Hughes, whom Shallal's Busboys And Poets chain is named in honor of. The two writers tried to collaborate on a play, Mule Bone, but things went sour: “They fought over copyright issues, but I think they wanted to be friends,” says Shallal. Since the restaurants are across the street from each other, Shallal sees it as a chance to reunite the two writers."

==== Shallal's green initiatives ====
Busboys and Poets was awarded one of the first "REAL" restaurants by the United States Healthful Food Council. REAL (Responsible Epicurean Agricultural Leadership) Certification is a program of the USHFC to help connect people who want healthful and sustainable food and beverages with the restaurants that provide them.

Busboys and Poets and Eatonville Restaurant are members of the American Sustainable Business Council.

Shallal is one of the co-founders of Think Local First Washington, DC.

== Awards ==
Shallal was honored at The DC Vote Champions of Democracy Awards Dinner on Tuesday, October 12, 2010, for advocating for full, equal voting rights for DC.

Shallal has received numerous awards including the Mayor's Arts Award, Martha's Table Luminary Award, Mayor's Environmental Award, United Nations Human Rights Community Award, as well as leadership awards in employment and sustainable business practices. He was also named Man of the Year by the Washington Peace Center.

He was named "Democracy's Restaurateur" by Ralph Nader in a Washington Post article by David Montgomery.

== Activism ==
Shallal has founded or co-founded several peace movement organizations and holds leadership positions in numerous others. Among them are Iraqi Americans for Peaceful Alternatives, created prior to the 2003 invasion, and The Peace Cafe, which seeks to promote Arab-Jewish dialogue. At 800 members it is the largest such group in the Washington, D.C., area. Shallal is a Peace Fellow with Seeds of Peace, and spokesperson for Education for Peace in Iraq Center (EPIC). Shallal is a recipient of the United Nations Human Rights Community Award and has been named Man of the Year by the Washington Peace Center.

In 2005, Shallal spoke at the counter-inaugural of President George W. Bush held at Malcolm X Park. Later that year, he visited and provided catering at Sheehan's Camp Casey protest in Crawford, Texas. Sheehan later participated in an Impeachment Forum sponsored by Democracy Rising at the U Street Busboys location.

He is a Foreign Policy In Focus analyst for the left-leaning think tank Institute for Policy Studies and current board member serving as Treasurer.

In 2010, the Cultural Alliance of Greater Washington gave an award to Shallal for his support of the local arts community.

On October 12, 2010, Shallal was awarded the Champions of Democracy Award by DCVote for his activism in support of voting rights for the people of the District of Columbia.

Shallal is a member of Restaurant Opportunities Centers United (ROC-United) which works to help improve wages and working conditions for restaurant workers.

Shallal also drew an original mural highlighting the struggle to end “Taxation without Representation” that was auctioned off at the gala to benefit DC Vote. “When Iraq got its voting rights,” Shallal said “I was able to vote in Iraq. I was surprised that I was able to vote in a representative government while I can’t in my own city where I live today.”

== Murals ==
Shallal painted the mural at the headquarters of the Institute for Policy Studies on 16th street NW, which depicts the story of IPS and social movements in which it has been involved. The mural is several hundred square feet and wraps around a 50-seat, square meeting room. Featured in the mural are the Rev. Martin Luther King Jr., Benjamin Spock and the late Minnesota Senator Paul Wellstone. Also included are Chilean diplomat and IPS fellow Orlando Letelier and his assistant Ronni Moffitt, who were killed by a car bomb on Embassy Row in 1976. The mural depicts former Chilean dictator Augusto Pinochet weeping into a handkerchief. As an IPS board member, Shallal painted the mural as a gift to the Institute.

Shallal painted the civil rights movement-themed mural at Busboys and Poets, called Peace in Struggle Wall. He refuses to sign the civil rights mural at Busboys, saying this would be a "final gesture" that would preclude him from making revisions later. All of the Busboys and Poets locations feature an original mural by Shallal.

Shallal's most recent mural, created in August 2013, is at the new Anthony Bowen YMCA, where he is a board member. The mural honors the legacy of the U St Corridor and Anthony Bowen.

== 2014 mayoral campaign ==
On November 8, 2013, he formally announced his candidacy for mayor of Washington, D.C. He was referred to as the Bill de Blasio of D.C. mayoral candidates and was endorsed by actor Danny Glover and writers George Pelecanos and Barbara Ehrenreich. He finished fifth with 3,196 votes or 3.3% of the total.

== See also ==
- Iraqi art
- List of Iraqi artists
