= 2016 United States Senate election in Maryland =

- November 8, 2016
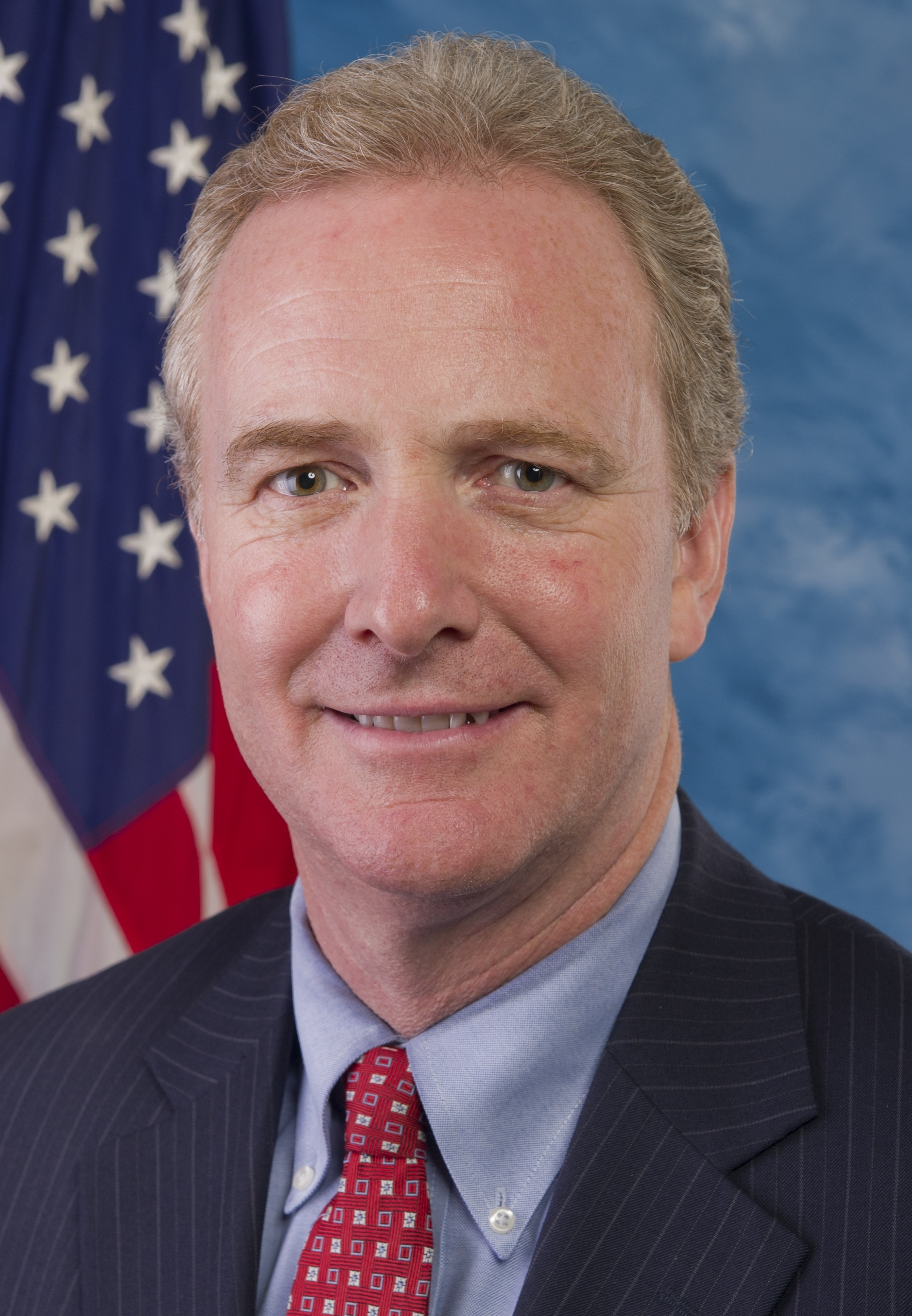

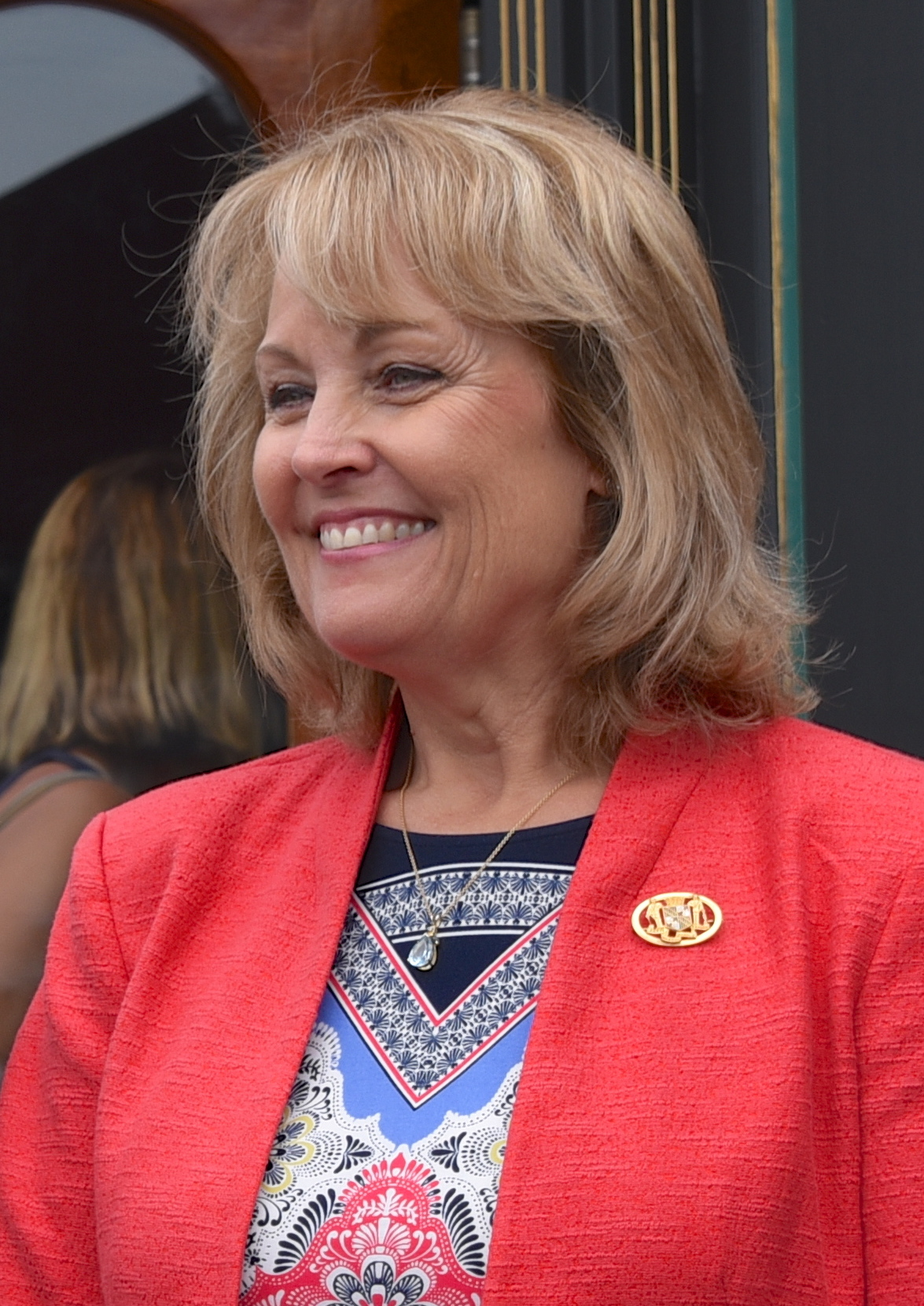
Nominee	Chris Van Hollen	Kathy Szeliga
Party	Democratic	Republican
Popular vote	1,659,907	972,557
Percentage	60.89%	35.67%
- Van Hollen: 40–50% 50–60% 60–70% 70–80% 80–90% >90% Szeliga: 40–50% 50–60% 60–70% 70–80% 80–90% >90% Tie: 40–50% 50% No votes
U.S. senator before election
Barbara Mikulski
Democratic
Elected U.S. Senator
Chris Van Hollen
Democratic

The 2016 United States Senate election in Maryland took place on November 8, 2016, to elect a member of the United States Senate to represent the State of Maryland, concurrently with the 2016 U.S. presidential election, as well as other elections to the United States Senate in other states and elections to the United States House of Representatives and various state and local elections.

Incumbent Democratic Senator Barbara Mikulski decided to retire after five terms in the Senate. Primary elections were held April 26, 2016, in which Chris Van Hollen and Kathy Szeliga were chosen as the Democratic and Republican party nominees, respectively. In addition, the Green Party chose Margaret Flowers and the Libertarian Party chose Arvin Vohra as their respective nominees.

Van Hollen was heavily favored to win the election. He ultimately won with over 60% of the vote. As typically occurs with the state's elections, most support for the Democratic nominee, Van Hollen, came from the densely populated Baltimore–Washington metropolitan area in central Maryland, while the Republican nominee, Szeliga, did well in the more sparsely populated areas on the Eastern Shore and in Western Maryland, and narrowly won Anne Arundel County, home to the state capital Annapolis, as well as exurban Frederick County.

== Background ==
Mikulski first ran for the U.S. Senate in 1974, losing to Republican incumbent Charles Mathias. Mikulski then served in the U.S. House of Representatives from 1977 to 1987 and was elected to the U.S. Senate in 1986, succeeding the retiring Mathias. She was re-elected by large margins in 1992, 1998, 2004 and 2010. Shortly after being sworn in for her fifth term in 2011, she succeeded Margaret Chase Smith as the longest-serving female senator in U.S. history, and on March 17, 2012, she became the longest-serving female member of Congress in U.S. history, surpassing Congresswoman Edith Nourse Rogers of Massachusetts, who served from 1925 to 1960. On March 2, 2015, Mikulski announced that she would not run for re-election to a sixth term in office.

In August 2013, Abby Livingston of Roll Call had predicted that a potential retirement by Mikulski would create "chaos" and "blow open Maryland's political bottleneck" because "the state's teeming political Democratic Party talent is backed up in lower offices." Among the ten Democrats who ran in the primary, only two had previously been elected to an office.

== Democratic primary ==
=== Candidates ===
==== Declared ====
- Freddy Donald Dickson Jr.
- Donna Edwards, U.S. representative
- Ralph Jaffe, perennial candidate
- Theresa Scaldaferri
- Charles U. Smith, perennial candidate
- Violet Staley
- Blaine Taylor
- Ed Tinus, perennial candidate
- Chris Van Hollen, U.S. representative
- Lih Young, perennial candidate

==== Declined ====
- Rushern Baker, Prince George's County executive (endorsed Chris Van Hollen)
- Anthony Brown, former lieutenant governor of Maryland and nominee for governor of Maryland in 2014 (ran for MD-04)
- Susan L. Burke, attorney
- Elijah Cummings, U.S. representative (ran for re-election)
- John Delaney, U.S. representative (ran for re-election)
- Peter Franchot, comptroller of Maryland
- Doug Gansler, former attorney general of Maryland and candidate for governor of Maryland in 2014
- Steny Hoyer, U.S. representative and House minority whip (ran for re-election)
- Benjamin Jealous, former president and CEO of the NAACP
- Kevin Kamenetz, Baltimore County executive
- Kathleen Kennedy Townsend, former lieutenant governor of Maryland, nominee for governor in 2002 and nominee for Maryland's 2nd congressional district in 1986
- Frank Kratovil, former U.S. representative
- Kweisi Mfume, former U.S. representative, former president and CEO of the NAACP, candidate for the U.S. Senate in 2006
- Barbara Mikulski, incumbent senator
- Heather Mizeur, former state delegate and candidate for governor in 2014
- Martin O'Malley, former governor of Maryland (ran for president)
- Thomas Perez, United States secretary of labor and former secretary of the Maryland Department of Labor, Licensing and Regulation
- Jamie Raskin, state senator (ran for MD-08)
- Stephanie Rawlings-Blake, mayor of Baltimore
- Dutch Ruppersberger, U.S. representative (ran for re-election)
- John Sarbanes, U.S. representative and son of former U.S. Senator Paul Sarbanes (ran for re-election)
- Kenneth Ulman, former Howard County executive and nominee for lieutenant governor in 2014

=== Debates ===
Dates	Location	Van Hollen	Edwards	Link
March 25, 2016	Baltimore, Maryland	Participant	Participant	

=== Endorsements ===
Donna Edwards

Federal politicians

- Carol Moseley Braun, former U.S. senator (D-IL) and former U.S. ambassador to New Zealand
- Kirsten Gillibrand, U.S. senator (D-NY)

Statewide politicians

- Debra Davis, Charles County commissioner
- Derrick Davis, Prince George's County council member
- Doug Duncan, former Montgomery County executive and former mayor of Rockville
- Mel Franklin, Prince George's County Council chairman
- Danielle Glaros, Prince George's County council member
- Andrea Harrison, Prince George's County council member
- Mary A. Lehman, Prince George's County council member
- Karen S. Montgomery, state senator
- Edith J. Patterson, state delegate and former Charles County commissioner
- Obie Patterson, Prince George's County council member and former state delegate
- Curtis Smith, Indian Head town councilman
- Karen Toles, Prince George's County council member

Other individuals

- Richard Stallman
- Barbra Streisand

Organizations

- Daily Kos
- Democracy for America
- EMILY's List
- Feminist Majority
- IBEW Local 26
- J Street
- Teamsters Local 639
- Women's Action for New Directions
Chris Van Hollen

Federal politicians

- Beverly Byron, former U.S. representative (D-MD)
- Harry Reid, U.S. senator (D-NV) and Senate minority leader
- Dutch Ruppersberger, U.S. representative (D-MD)

Governors

- Martin O'Malley, former governor (D-MD), 2007–2015

Statewide politicians

- Vanessa Atterbeary, state delegate
- Rushern Baker, Prince George's County executive
- Kumar Barve, state delegate and former majority leader of the Maryland House of Delegates
- Joanne C. Benson, state senator
- Roger Berliner, Montgomery County council member
- Jerry Donald, Frederick County council member
- Marc Elrich, Montgomery County council member
- Jessica Fitzwater, Frederick County council member
- Nancy Floreen, Montgomery County council member and former mayor of Garrett Park
- Brian Frosh, attorney general of Maryland
- Jan Gardner, Frederick County executive
- James W. Gilchrist, state delegate
- Guy Guzzone, state senator
- Sheila E. Hixson, state delegate
- Tom Hucker, Montgomery County council member and former state delegate
- Kevin Kamenetz, Baltimore County executive
- Sidney A. Katz, Montgomery County council member and former mayor of Gaithersburg
- Delores G. Kelley, state senator
- Kathleen Kennedy Townsend, former lieutenant governor of Maryland, nominee for governor in 2002 and nominee for Maryland's 2nd congressional district in 1986
- Marc Korman, state delegate
- Susan C. Lee, state senator
- Isiah Leggett, Montgomery County executive and former chairman of the Maryland Democratic Party
- George Leventhal, Montgomery County council member
- Maggie McIntosh, state delegate
- Heather Mizeur, former state delegate and candidate for governor in 2014
- David Moon, state delegate
- Nancy Navarro, Montgomery County council member
- Jamie Raskin, state senator
- Craig L. Rice, Montgomery County council member
- Hans Riemer, Montgomery County council member
- William C. Smith Jr., state delegate
- Dana Stein, state delegate
- Frank S. Turner, state delegate
- Ronald N. Young, state senator
- Robert Zirkin, state senator

Other individuals

- Oscar Ramirez, former vice chair of the Maryland Democratic Party
- Robert Reich, former United States secretary of labor
- Mike Tidwell, founder and director of the Chesapeake Climate Action Network
- Susan Turnbull, former chair of the Maryland Democratic Party

Newspapers

- The Baltimore Sun
- The Washington Post

Organizations

- J Street
- Teamsters Joint Council No. 55
- Teamsters Joint Council No. 62
Declined to endorse

Federal politicians

- Ben Cardin, U.S. senator (D-MD)
- Steny Hoyer, U.S. representative (D-MD) and House minority whip
- Barbara Mikulski, retiring U.S. senator for this seat (D-MD)
- Nancy Pelosi, U.S. representative (D-CA) and House minority leader

=== Polling ===
Poll source	Date(s) administered	Sample size	Margin of error	Donna Edwards	Chris Van Hollen	Other	Undecided
Monmouth University	April 18–20, 2016	300	± 5.7%	36%	52%	1%	11%
Public Policy Polling	April 15–17, 2016	492	± 4.4%	33%	42%	—	25%
Marist College	April 5–9, 2016	775	± 3.5%	38%	44%	—	18%
Washington Post/University of Maryland	March 30 – April 3, 2016	539	± 4.5%	44%	40%	—	16%
Garin-Hart-Yang Research	March 28–30, 2016	604	± 4.9%	40%	45%	—	15%
University of Baltimore	March 4–9, 2016	400	± 4.9%	34%	28%	—	31%
Gonzales Research	February 29 – March 4, 2016	411	± 5.0%	41%	42%	—	17%
Goucher College	February 13–18, 2016	307	± 5.6%	39%	37%	—	24%
Gonzales Research	January 11–16, 2016	402	± 5%	36%	38%	—	24%
University of Baltimore	November 13–17, 2015	419	± 4.8%	19%	28%	40%	13%
University of Baltimore	November 13–17, 2015	419	± 4.8%	31%	45%	—	24%
Washington Post/University of Maryland	October 8–11, 2015	1,006	± 3.5%	20%	20%	33%	27%
Global Strategy Group (D-Edwards)	August 3–9, 2015	600	± 4%	42%	37%	—	21%
Mellman Group (D-Cummings)	March 19–22, 2015	700	± 3.7%	23%	22%	29%	27%

=== Results ===
Results by county: Van Hollen: 30–40%; 40–50%; 50–60%; 60–70%; 70–80%; Edwards: 50–60%; 60–70%

Results by precinct: Van Hollen: 30–40%; 40–50%; 50–60%; 60–70%; 70–80%; 80–90%; 90–100%; Edwards: 30–40%; 40–50%; 50–60%; 60–70%; 70–80%; 80–90%; 90–100%; Smith: 90–100%; Young: 90–100%; Jaffe: 90–100%; Staley: 50–60%; Tie No votes

Democratic primary results, April 26
Party	Candidate	Votes	%
Democratic	Chris Van Hollen	470,320	53.2%
Democratic	Donna Edwards	343,620	38.9%
Democratic	Freddie Dickson	14,856	1.7%
Democratic	Theresa Scaldaferri	13,178	1.5%
Democratic	Violet Staley	10,244	1.2%
Democratic	Lih Young	8,561	1.0%
Democratic	Charles Smith	7,912	0.9%
Democratic	Ralph Jaffe	7,161	0.8%
Democratic	Blaine Taylor	5,932	0.7%
Democratic	Ed Tinus	2,560	0.3%
Total votes		884,344	100.0%

== Republican primary ==
=== Candidates ===
==== Declared ====
- Chris Chaffee, candidate for MD-05 in 2010 and nominee for MD-05 in 2014
- Sean P. Connor
- Richard Douglas, attorney, former deputy assistant secretary of defense and candidate for the U.S. Senate in 2012
- John Graziani, candidate for MD-04 in 2014
- Greg Holmes, candidate for MD-04 in 2012 and 2014 and Democratic state senate candidate in 2006
- Joseph Hooe, small business owner
- Chrys Kefalas, vice president of executive communications for the National Association of Manufacturers and deputy legal counsel under Governor Bob Ehrlich
- Mark McNicholas
- Lynn Richardson
- Anthony Seda
- Richard Shawver, candidate for U.S. Senate in 2006
- Kathy Szeliga, state delegate and House minority whip
- Dave Wallace, businessman and nominee for MD-08 in 2014
- Garry Thomas Yarrington

==== Declined ====
- Dan Bongino, former United States Secret Service agent, nominee for the U.S. Senate in 2012 and nominee for Maryland's 6th congressional district in 2014 (moved to Florida)
- Ben Carson, author and retired director of pediatric neurosurgery at Johns Hopkins Hospital (running for President)
- Kendel Ehrlich, former First Lady of Maryland
- Robert Ehrlich, former governor of Maryland
- Barry Glassman, Harford County executive
- Jeannie Haddaway-Riccio, former state delegate and candidate for lieutenant governor in 2014
- Andy Harris, U.S. representative (running for re-election)
- Larry Hogan, governor of Maryland
- Mary Kane, former secretary of state of Maryland and nominee for lieutenant governor in 2010
- Allan Kittleman, Howard County executive
- Connie Morella, former U.S. representative and former U.S. ambassador to the Organisation for Economic Co-operation and Development
- Laura Neuman, former Anne Arundel County executive
- Boyd Rutherford, lieutenant governor of Maryland
- Steve Schuh, Anne Arundel County executive
- Michael Steele, former lieutenant governor of Maryland, former chairman of the Republican National Committee and nominee for the U.S. Senate in 2006

=== Endorsements ===
Chrys Kefalas

Newspapers

- The Baltimore Sun
Kathy Szeliga

U.S. senators (current and former)

- Mike Lee, Utah
- Trent Lott, Mississippi (former) and senior fellow at the Bipartisan Policy Center

U.S. representatives (current and former)

- Helen Bentley, Maryland (former)
- Andy Harris, Maryland

Individuals

- Ellen Sauerbrey, former assistant secretary of state for population, refugees, and migration

Statewide politicians

- Christopher Adams, Maryland state delegate
- Kathy Afzali, Maryland state delegate
- Carl Anderton Jr., Maryland state delegate
- Steven Arentz, Maryland state delegate
- Susan Aumann, Maryland state delegate
- Gail H. Bates, Maryland state senator
- Wendell R. Beitzel, Maryland state delegate
- Jason Buckel, Maryland state delegate
- Mary Beth Carozza, Maryland state delegate
- Andrew Cassilly, Maryland state delegate
- Bob Cassilly, Maryland state senator
- Barrie Ciliberti, former Maryland state delegate and current University of Maryland University College professor
- John W. E. Cluster Jr., Maryland state delegate
- Bob Culver, Wicomico County executive
- Adelaide C. Eckardt, Maryland state senator
- George C. Edwards, Maryland state senator
- Robert Flanagan, Maryland state delegate
- William Folden, Maryland state delegate
- Jeff Ghrist, Maryland state delegate
- Glen Glass, Maryland state delegate
- Robin Grammer Jr., Maryland state delegate
- Steve Hershey, Maryland Senate minority whip
- Larry Hogan, governor of Maryland
- Kevin Hornberger, Maryland state delegate
- Michael Hough, Maryland state senator
- Seth A. Howard, Maryland state delegate
- Richard Impallaria, Maryland state delegate
- Jay Jacobs, Maryland state delegate
- J. B. Jennings, Maryland Senate minority leader
- Nic Kipke, minority leader of the Maryland House of Delegates
- Trent Kittleman, Maryland state delegate
- Susan W. Krebs, Maryland state delegate
- Mike Lewis, Wicomico County sheriff
- Bob Long, Maryland state delegate
- Michael Malone, Maryland state delegate
- Susan McComas, Maryland state delegate
- Tony McConkey, Maryland state delegate
- Mike McKay, Maryland state delegate
- Herb McMillan, Maryland state delegate
- Ric Metzgar, Maryland state delegate
- Christian Miele, Maryland state delegate
- Tari Moore, Cecil County executive
- Matthew Morgan, Maryland state delegate
- H. Wayne Norman Jr., Maryland state senator
- Charles Otto, Maryland state delegate
- Neil Parrott, Maryland state delegate
- Justin Ready, Maryland state senator
- Edward R. Reilly, Maryland state senator
- Deb Rey, Maryland state delegate
- April Rose, Maryland state delegate
- Sid Saab, Maryland state delegate
- Johnny Ray Salling, Maryland state senator
- Steve Schuh, Anne Arundel County executive
- Audrey Scott, former chair of the Maryland Republican Party
- Andrew A. Serafini, Maryland state senator
- Haven Shoemaker, Maryland state delegate
- Bryan Simonaire, Maryland state senator
- Meagan Simonaire, Maryland state delegate
- David Vogt, Maryland state delegate
- Steve Waugh, Maryland state senator
- Christopher West, Maryland state delegate
- Brett Wilson, Maryland state delegate
- William J. Wivell, Maryland state delegate

Organizations

- American Conservative Union, grassroots conservative organization
- Citizens United, conservative non-profit organization
- Maryland Right to Life, pro-life organization
- RightNOW Women, conservative women's organization
- VIEWPAC, organization supporting conservative women officials

=== Polling ===
Poll source	Date(s) administered	Sample size	Margin of error	Kathy Szeliga	Richard Douglas	Barry Glassman	Chrys Kefalas	Anthony Seda	Undecided
Marist College	April 5–9, 2016	368	± 5.1%	20%	13%	–	9%	–	57%
Washington Post/University of Maryland	March 30 – April 3, 2016	283	± 7.5%	15%	9%	–	11%	–	46%
University of Baltimore	March 4–8, 2016	400	± 4.9%	6%	1%	–	2%	<1%	79%
University of Baltimore	November 13–17, 2015	307	± 5.6%	15%	9%	8%	5%	4%	59%

=== Results ===
Primary results by county Szeliga: 20–30%; 30–40%; 40–50%; 50–60%; Chaffee: 20–30%; 30–40%; 40–50%; 50–60%

Republican primary results
Party	Candidate	Votes	%
Republican	Kathy Szeliga	135,337	35.6%
Republican	Chris Chaffee	52,066	13.7%
Republican	Chrys Kefalas	36,340	9.6%
Republican	Richard Douglas	29,007	7.6%
Republican	Dave Wallace	23,226	6.1%
Republican	Sean Connor	21,727	5.7%
Republican	Lynn Richardson	20,792	5.5%
Republican	John Graziani	16,722	4.4%
Republican	Greg Holmes	16,148	4.3%
Republican	Mark McNicholas	9,988	2.6%
Republican	Joe Hooe	8,282	2.2%
Republican	Anthony Seda	3,873	1.0%
Republican	Richard Shawver	3,155	0.8%
Republican	Garry Yarrington	2,988	0.8%
Total votes		379,651	100.0%

Szeliga won the April 26, 2016, primary in Baltimore City and each of Maryland's counties except Calvert, St. Mary's, Charles, and Prince George's, in which Chris Chaffee received more votes.

== Third party and independent candidates ==
=== Green Party ===
- Margaret Flowers, former pediatrician, healthcare activist and radio host

==== Results ====
Green Party primary results
Party	Candidate	Votes	%
Green	Margaret Flowers	125	98.0%
Green	None of the above	3	2.0%
Total votes		128	100.0%

=== Independents ===
- Greg Dorsey
- Steve Gladstone
- Edward Shlikas
- Kay Young

=== Libertarian Party ===
- Arvin Vohra, nominee for MD-05 in 2012 and for MD-04 in 2014

== General election ==
=== Candidates ===
- Margaret Flowers (G), former pediatrician, healthcare activist and radio host
- Kathy Szeliga (R), state delegate and House minority whip
- Chris Van Hollen (D), U.S. representative
- Arvin Vohra (L), nominee for MD-05 in 2012 and for MD-04 in 2014

=== Debates ===
Dates	Location	Van Hollen	Szeliga	Link
October 26, 2016	Baltimore, Maryland	Participant	Participant	

=== Endorsements ===
Chris Van Hollen

Federal politicians

- Beverly Byron, former U.S. representative (D-MD)
- Ben Cardin, U.S. senator (D-MD)
- Steny Hoyer, U.S. representative (D-MD) and House minority whip
- Barbara Mikulski, outgoing U.S. senator for this seat (D-MD)
- Harry Reid, U.S. senator (D-NV) and Senate minority leader
- Dutch Ruppersberger, U.S. representative (D-MD)

Statewide politicians

- Vanessa Atterbeary, state delegate
- Rushern Baker, Prince George's County executive
- Kumar Barve, state delegate and former majority leader of the Maryland House of Delegates
- Joanne C. Benson, state senator
- Roger Berliner, Montgomery County council member
- Jerry Donald, Frederick County council member
- Marc Elrich, Montgomery County council member
- Jessica Fitzwater, Frederick County council member
- Nancy Floreen, Montgomery County council member and former mayor of Garrett Park
- Brian Frosh, attorney general of Maryland
- Jan Gardner, Frederick County executive
- James W. Gilchrist, state delegate
- Guy Guzzone, state senator
- Sheila E. Hixson, state delegate
- Tom Hucker, Montgomery County council member and former state delegate
- Kevin Kamenetz, Baltimore County executive
- Sidney A. Katz, Montgomery County council member and former mayor of Gaithersburg
- M.C. Keegan-Ayer, Frederick County council member
- Delores G. Kelley, state senator
- Kathleen Kennedy Townsend, former lieutenant governor of Maryland, nominee for governor in 2002 and nominee for Maryland's 2nd congressional district in 1986
- Marc Korman, state delegate
- Susan C. Lee, state senator
- Isiah Leggett, Montgomery County executive and former chairman of the Maryland Democratic Party
- George Leventhal, Montgomery County council member
- Maggie McIntosh, state delegate
- Heather Mizeur, former state delegate and candidate for governor in 2014
- David Moon, state delegate
- Nancy Navarro, Montgomery County council member
- Jamie Raskin, state senator
- Craig L. Rice, Montgomery County council member
- Hans Riemer, Montgomery County council member
- William C. Smith, state delegate
- Dana Stein, state delegate
- Frank S. Turner, state delegate
- Ronald N. Young, state senator
- Robert Zirkin, state senator

Other individuals

- Oscar Ramirez, former vice chair of the Maryland Democratic Party
- Robert Reich, former United States secretary of labor
- Mike Tidwell, founder and director of the Chesapeake Climate Action Network
- Susan Turnbull, former chair of the Maryland Democratic Party

Newspapers

- The Baltimore Sun
- The Washington Post

Organizations

- J Street
- Teamsters Joint Council No. 55
- Teamsters Joint Council No. 62
Kathy Szeliga

Governors

- Larry Hogan, Maryland

U.S. senators (current and former)

- Mike Lee, Utah
- Trent Lott, Mississippi (former) and Senior Fellow at the Bipartisan Policy Center

U.S. representatives (current and former)

- Helen Bentley, Maryland (former)
- Andy Harris, Maryland

Individuals

- David Bossie, former chief congressional investigator and president of Citizens United
- Carly Fiorina, former CEO of Hewlett-Packard, 2010 nominee for Senate in California and 2016 presidential candidate
- Amie Hoeber, former deputy under secretary of the Army and 2016 congressional candidate for Maryland's 6th congressional district
- Chrys Kefalas, vice president of executive communications for the National Association of Manufacturers and former Republican candidate for U.S. Senate
- Ellen Sauerbrey, former assistant secretary of state for population, refugees, and migration
- Audrey Scott, former chair of the Maryland Republican Party
- Michael Steele, former lieutenant governor of Maryland and former chair of the Republican National Committee
- Diana Waterman, chairwoman of the Maryland Republican Party

Statewide politicians

- Christopher Adams, Maryland state delegate
- Kathy Afzali, Maryland state delegate
- Carl Anderton, Maryland state delegate
- Steve Arentz, Maryland state delegate
- Susan Aumann, Maryland state delegate
- Gail H. Bates, Maryland state senator
- Wendell R. Beitzel, Maryland state delegate
- Jason Buckel, Maryland state delegate
- MaryBeth Carrozza, Maryland state delegate
- Andrew Cassily, Maryland state delegate
- Bob Cassily, Maryland state senator
- Barrie Ciliberti, former Maryland state delegate and current University of Maryland University College professor
- John W. E. Cluster Jr., Maryland state delegate
- Bob Culver, Wicomico County executive
- Adelaide C. Eckardt, Maryland state senator
- George C. Edwards, Maryland state senator
- Robert Flanagan, Maryland state delegate
- William Folden, Maryland state delegate
- Greg Fox, Howard County councilman
- Jeff Ghrist, Maryland state delegate
- Glen Glass, Maryland state delegate
- Robin Grammer, Maryland state delegate
- Steve Hershey, Maryland Senate minority whip
- Kevin Hornberger, Maryland state delegate
- Michael Hough, Maryland state senator
- Seth Howard, Maryland state delegate
- Richard Impallaria, Maryland state delegate
- Jay Jacobs, Maryland state delegate
- J. B. Jennings, Maryland Senate minority leader
- Nic Kipke, minority leader of the Maryland House of Delegates
- Allan H. Kittleman, Howard County executive
- Trent Kittleman, Maryland state delegate
- Susan W. Krebs, Maryland state delegate
- Mike Lewis, Wicomico County sheriff
- Bob Long, Maryland state delegate
- Michael Malone, Maryland state delegate
- Susan McComas, Maryland state delegate
- Tony McConkey, Maryland state delegate
- Mike McKay, Maryland state delegate
- Herb McMillan, Maryland state delegate
- Ric Metzger, Maryland state delegate
- Christian Miele, Maryland state delegate
- R. Clayton Mitchell Jr., former speaker of the Maryland House of Delegates (Democratic)
- Tari Moore, Cecil County executive
- Matthew Morgan, Maryland state delegate
- Wayne Norman, Maryland state senator
- Charles Otto, Maryland state delegate
- Neil Parrott, Maryland state delegate
- Justin Ready, Maryland state senator
- Edward R. Reilly, Maryland state senator
- Deb Rey, Maryland state delegate
- April Rose, Maryland state delegate
- Sid Saab, Maryland state delegate
- Johnny Salling, Maryland state senator
- Andrew A. Serafini, Maryland state senator
- Haven Shoemaker, Maryland state delegate
- Bryan Simonaire, Maryland state senator
- Meagan Simonaire, Maryland state delegate
- Steve Schuh, Anne Arundel County executive
- Audrey Scott, former chair of the Maryland Republican Party
- David Vogt, Maryland state delegate
- Steve Waugh, Maryland state senator
- Christopher West, Maryland state delegate
- Brett Wilson, Maryland state delegate
- William Wivell, Maryland state delegate

Newspapers

- Carroll County Times

Organizations

- American Conservative Union, grassroots conservative organization
- Citizens United, conservative non-profit organization
- Maggie's List, political action committee supporting fiscally conservative women in political office
- Maryland Right to Life, pro-life organization
- National Federation of Independent Business, small business association
- National Republican Senatorial Committee, Republican Hill committee for the United States Senate
- RightNOW Women, conservative women's organization
- VIEWPAC, organization supporting conservative women officials

=== Predictions ===
Source	Ranking	As of
The Cook Political Report	Safe D	November 2, 2016
Sabato's Crystal Ball	Safe D	November 7, 2016
Rothenberg Political Report	Safe D	November 3, 2016
Daily Kos	Safe D	November 8, 2016
Real Clear Politics	Safe D	November 7, 2016

=== Polling ===
Poll source	Date(s) administered	Sample size	Margin of error	Chris Van Hollen (D)	Kathy Szeliga (R)	Other	Undecided
SurveyMonkey	November 1–7, 2016	1,216	± 4.6%	64%	33%	—	3%
SurveyMonkey	October 31 – November 6, 2016	1,056	± 4.6%	64%	33%	—	3%
SurveyMonkey	October 28 – November 3, 2016	851	± 4.6%	66%	32%	—	2%
SurveyMonkey	October 27 – November 2, 2016	772	± 4.6%	67%	31%	—	2%
SurveyMonkey	October 26 – November 1, 2016	695	± 4.6%	66%	31%	—	3%
SurveyMonkey	October 25–31, 2016	740	± 4.6%	66%	31%	—	3%
University of Maryland/Washington Post	September 27–30, 2016	706	± 4.0%	58%	29%	5%	6%
Goucher College	September 17–20, 2016	514	± 4.3%	54%	24%	2%	19%
OpinionWorks	August 18–30, 2016	754	± 3.6%	55%	26%	1%	19%
Public Policy Polling	April 15–17, 2016	879	± 3.3%	53%	25%	—	22%

=== Results ===

United States Senate election in Maryland, 2016
Party	Candidate	Votes	%	±%
Democratic	Chris Van Hollen	1,659,907	60.89%	−1.30%
Republican	Kathy Szeliga	972,557	35.67%	−0.08%
Green	Margaret Flowers	89,970	3.30%	+2.17%
Write-in		3,736	0.14%	+0.03%
Total votes		2,726,170	100.00%	N/A
Democratic hold				

==== By county ====
County	Chris Van Hollen Democratic		Kathy Szeliga Republican		Margaret Flowers Green		Write-in Write-in		Margin		Total votes cast
County	#	%	#	%	#	%	#	%	#	%	Total votes cast
Allegany	8,549	32.1%	16,993	63.8%	1,113	4.2%	32	0.1%	-8444	-31.7%	26687
Anne Arundel	116,422	47.8%	119,760	49.2%	7,374	3.0%	305	0.1%	-3338	-1.4%	243556
Baltimore (County)	189,041	56.4%	135,846	40.5%	10,212	3.0%	511	0.2%	53195	15.9%	335099
Baltimore (City)	171,318	82.7%	26,353	12.7%	9,550	4.6%	463	0.2%	144965	70.0%	207684
Calvert	17,094	40.1%	23,867	56.0%	1,691	4.0%	76	0.2%	-6773	-15.9%	42654
Caroline	4,306	32.6%	8,560	64.9%	327	2.5%	11	0.1%	-4254	-32.3%	13193
Carroll	25,415	29.9%	57,540	67.6%	2,149	2.5%	80	0.1%	-32125	-37.7%	85184
Cecil	13,864	33.4%	26,143	63.0%	1,517	3.7%	58	0.1%	-12279	-29.6%	41478
Charles	45,834	63.6%	24,038	33.4%	2,159	3.0%	105	0.1%	21796	30.2%	72041
Dorchester	6,127	44.4%	7,351	53.3%	321	2.3%	15	0.1%	-1224	-8.9%	13814
Frederick	52,651	46.0%	57,432	50.2%	4,382	3.8%	163	0.1%	-4781	-4.2%	114628
Garrett	2,402	19.3%	9,655	77.7%	371	3.0%	18	0.1%	-7253	-58.4%	12446
Harford	44,758	35.9%	76,563	61.4%	3,431	2.8%	148	0.1%	-31805	-25.5%	124900
Howard	89,622	60.9%	52,577	35.8%	4,854	3.3%	224	0.2%	37045	25.1%	147277
Kent	4,320	47.1%	4,641	50.6%	205	2.2%	4	0.04%	-321	-3.5%	9170
Montgomery	307,892	74.9%	91,966	22.4%	11,121	2.7%	570	0.1%	215926	52.5%	410979
Prince George's	305,992	88.1%	30,451	8.8%	10,961	3.2%	652	0.2%	275541	79.3%	347056
Queen Anne's	7,834	31.9%	16,178	65.8%	576	2.3%	19	0.1%	-8344	-33.9%	24607
Somerset	3,610	41.6%	4,894	56.4%	166	1.9%	10	0.1%	-1284	-14.8%	8670
St. Mary's	16,338	36.7%	26,395	59.4%	1,730	3.9%	65	0.1%	-10057	-22.7%	44428
Talbot	8,208	43.6%	10,212	54.3%	391	2.1%	18	0.1%	-2004	-10.7%	18829
Washington	21,422	36.3%	35,312	59.8%	2,298	3.9%	89	0.2%	-13890	-23.5%	59121
Wicomico	16,692	43.3%	20,713	53.7%	1,163	3.0%	56	0.1%	-4021	-10.4%	38568
Worcester	9,134	36.1%	15,462	61.1%	690	2.7%	26	0.1%	-6328	-25.0%	25312

Counties that flipped from Democratic to Republican

- Dorchester (largest municipality: Cambridge)
- Somerset (largest municipality: Princess Anne)
- Wicomico (largest municipality: Salisbury)
- Anne Arundel (largest municipality: Glen Burnie)
- Kent (largest municipality: Chestertown)
- Talbot (largest municipality: Easton)

==== By congressional district ====
Van Hollen seven of eight congressional districts.

District	Van Hollen	Szeliga	Representative
1st	35%	62%	Andy Harris
2nd	61%	36%	Dutch Ruppersberger
3rd	62%	35%	John Sarbanes
4th	76%	21%	Donna Edwards
4th	76%	21%	Anthony Brown
5th	64%	33%	Steny Hoyer
6th	57%	39%	John Delaney
7th	72%	24%	Elijah Cummings
8th	64%	33%	Chris Van Hollen
8th	64%	33%	Jamie Raskin

== See also ==
- 2016 United States Senate elections
- 2016 United States elections
