= Kevin Zeese =

American activist

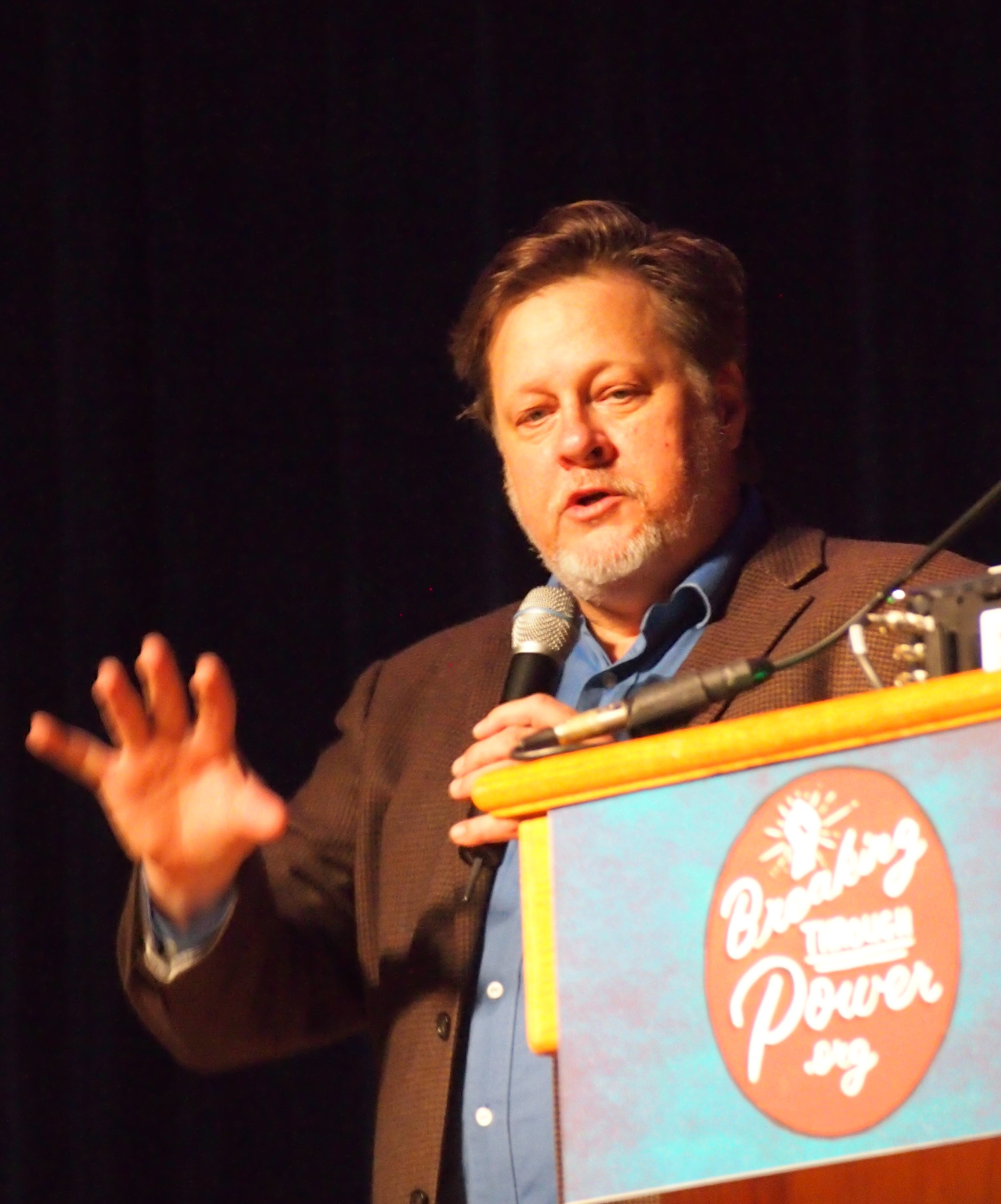

Personal details
- Born: October 28, 1955 New York, New York, U.S.
- Died: September 6, 2020 (aged 64) Baltimore, Maryland, U.S.
- Party: Green
- Domestic partner: Margaret Flowers
- Children: Alexander B Zeese, Daniel A Zeese
- Education: SUNY Buffalo, (BS); George Washington University Law School, (JD)
- Profession: Activist, Attorney

Kevin Bruce Zeese (October 28, 1955 – September 6, 2020) was an American lawyer, U.S. Senate candidate and political activist. He worked to end the war on drugs and mass incarceration, and was instrumental in organizing the 2011 Occupy encampment in Washington, D.C. at Freedom Plaza and occupying the Venezuelan Embassy in the District of Columbia. Zeese co-founded the news site PopularResistance.org in 2011 with his partner, Margeret Flowers. Zeese died of a heart attack on September 6, 2020.

== Early life ==
Zeese was born in New York City in 1955. He grew up in Queens, New York, where he attended public schools. He received a bachelor's degree from the State University of New York at Buffalo. He graduated from the George Washington University Law School in 1980.

== Career ==
=== Advocacy for the end of the War on Drugs ===
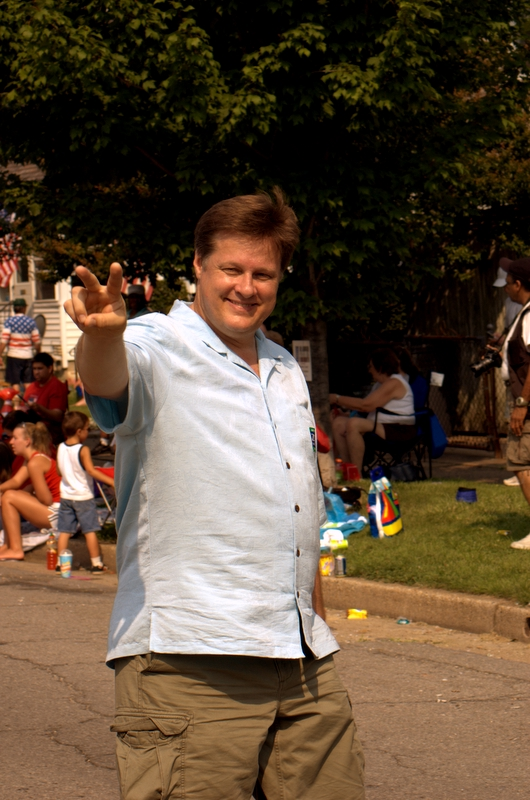
Zeese in Dundalk, Maryland, 2006

Zeese began his career as an advocate working as chief counsel for National Organization for the Reform of Marijuana Laws (NORML) in 1980 and served as NORML's Executive Director from 1983 to 1986. During his time at NORML he helped stop the spraying of herbicides on marijuana in Mexico and the United States, and he became a leading advocate of the medical use of marijuana.

Zeese co-founded the Drug Policy Foundation (DPF) with Professor Arnold S. Trebach in 1987 which merged with the Lindesmith Center in 2000 and is now the Drug Policy Alliance. Zeese served as Vice President and Counsel to DPF from 1986 to 1994. Drug Policy Foundation was the largest drug policy reform advocacy group until it merged with Drug Policy Alliance, now the largest reform group in U.S. history.

Zeese was a founder in 1993 of Harm Reduction Coalition, which advocates for a public health approach to drug policy that reduces the harms from drug use and abuse. Harm Reduction Coalition is "driven by a commitment to drug user rights and social inclusion of marginalized communities" and has advocated for and helped put in place policies like needle exchange programs, treatment on request, overdose prevention strategies and low threshold access to methadone treatment among other issues.

In 1994 he co-founded the Common Sense for Drug Policy along with businessman and philanthropist Robert E. Field and attorney Melvin R. Allen. Zeese continued to serve as president of Common Sense. The organization ran 152 public service advertisements in Reason, The American Prospect, The National Review, The Nation, The New Republic, and The Progressive from 1999 to 2007. Common Sense has published Drug War Facts since 1998, providing facts and citations covering 47 issue-areas related to drug policy.

=== Activism ===
In 2002, he worked with Washington, D.C. area peace groups in opposing the war in Iraq including the Montgomery County Coalition Against War. In 2004 he joined with Ralph Nader's Democracy Rising to make opposition to war a focus of the organization. In 2006, Zeese founded a national antiwar group, Voters for Peace and served as its director until 2011.

In October 2011, he was one of the co-founders of Occupy DC, which later merged into Popular Resistance. On January 29, 2021, another of the co-founders of Occupy DC died, Reverend Bruce Wright of the Poor Peoples Army.

In January 2018, Zeese outlined his anti-interventionist position in a column, stating: "The United States cannot be a moral or ethical country until it faces up to the realities of U.S. empire and the destruction it causes around the world. The U.S. undermines governments (including democracies), kills millions of people, causes mass migrations of people fleeing their homes, communities and countries and produces vast environmental damage." He also criticized humanitarian intervention saying that it is "based on the dubious claim that the U.S. has a 'responsibility to protect.'"

Zeese is listed in the U.S. Peace Registry which also provides a summary of his work.

== Political activity ==
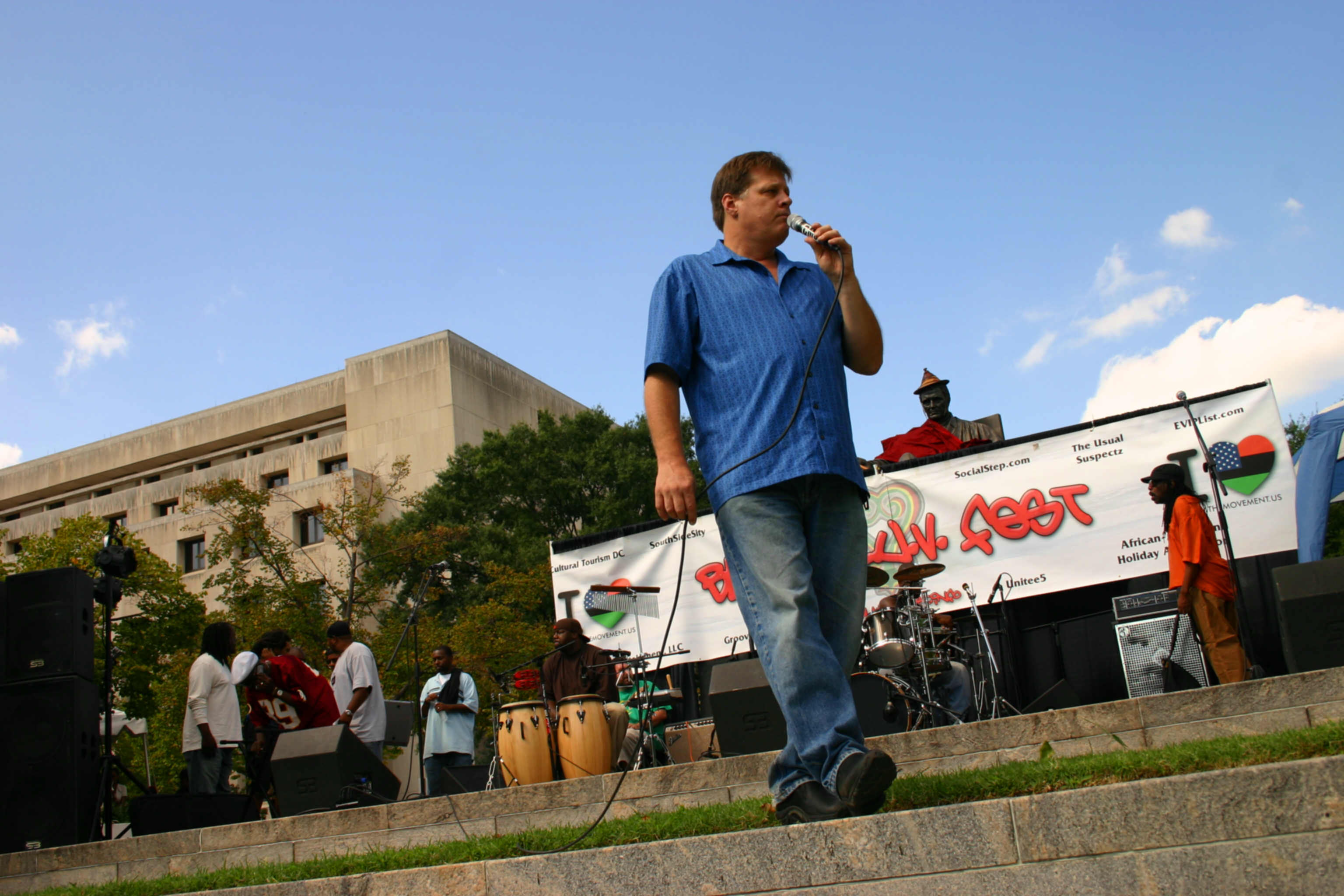
Zeese speaking in Washington, D.C. in 2006

Zeese had his first official campaign involvement serving as an advisor to Linda Schade, who was running for the Maryland House of Delegates in 2002.

From 2003 onward, Zeese worked on a broad range of progressive issues and third-party and independent electoral campaigns. He was primarily active with the Green Party and even ran for office himself.

In 2003, Zeese went to California to work on the gubernatorial campaign of Peter Camejo in the election that followed the recall of Governor Gray Davis. Zeese was involved in writing position papers and organizing grassroots support for Camejo.

=== 2004 Nader campaign ===
In 2004, Zeese joined the presidential campaign of Ralph Nader. His initial responsibility was developing a strategy for ballot access. He went on to become press secretary and spokesperson for Nader, and also worked with Nader in drafting position statements.

=== 2006 U.S. Senate candidacy ===
Zeese ran for the U.S. Senate for Maryland in 2006 against Democrat Ben Cardin and Republican Michael Steele. After months of campaigning, Zeese received the Maryland Green Party's nomination for the U.S. Senate, and was also nominated by the Libertarian Party of Maryland in April 2006 and the Populist Party of Maryland in June. This is the only time the Greens and Libertarians nominated the same person for a statewide office. It is also the only time all three parties had nominated the same candidate. However, in early April 2006, the Maryland legislature passed SB 129, which held a candidate can be nominated by only a party with which he is registered. Therefore, Zeese ran on the Maryland Green Party ticket, with the Libertarians and Populists endorsing the nomination.

Zeese called his campaign the "Unity Campaign" and ran on a reform platform that advocated the withdrawal of U.S. troops and corporate interests from Iraq, economic justice, an end to corporate welfare (which he termed "big business socialism"), and electronic voting reform. He also was a vocal critic of the "hawkish" Israel lobby in the United States and Israel's 2006 bombing campaign against Lebanon. He challenged incumbent U.S. congressman Ben Cardin, who has close ties to the lobby, to break his silence on alleged Israeli wrongdoing.

Zeese was the first third-party candidate included in three-way debate; only one debate was publicly televised, the final Senatorial debate on Friday, November 3, 2006. In it he urged the audience to reject the major parties, saying: "Change has not come from status quo parties, it's come from the outside." Zeese finished third in the voting, receiving 27,564 votes for 1.5% of the total vote.

=== 2016 Flowers campaign ===
In 2016, Zeese served as an advisor to the U.S. Senate Campaign of Margaret Flowers, his partner and a pediatrician.

=== 2020 Hawkins campaign ===
In 2020, Zeese served as press secretary to the Presidential Campaign of Howie Hawkins until Zeese's death.

=== 2020 Venezuelan embassy protection ===
Zeese was an outspoken supporter of the Bolivarian Revolution and the United Socialist Party of Venezuela's policies. Zeese was also an ardent supporter of Nicolás Maduro, and argued during the Venezuelan presidential crisis that Maduro was the legitimate President of Venezuela, while stating that Juan Guaidó's appointment as Interim President by the National Assembly was a coup by the U.S. government. Zeese and former Senate candidate Margaret Flowers joined two other Green Party members participating in a delegation which traveled to Venezuela to meet with officials from the Maduro government, including Foreign Minister Jorge Arreaza. On March 15, Maduro met with the American delegation in Caracas for an hour and a half.

On April 10, 2019, the group Code Pink began occupying the embassy of Venezuela, Washington, D.C. by invitation from the Maduro government, after the withdrawal of its diplomats. The group was officially led by Code Pink founder Medea Benjamin, but Zeese was prominently visible as a spokesman for the group and for the policies and interests of the Maduro government. On May 16, DC Metropolitan Police, Department of State Diplomatic Security Service, and the Secret Service entered the embassy and arrested Zeese, along with the other three remaining members of the group. The members were charged in a federal court with a Class A misdemeanor; "interfering with a federal law enforcement agent engaged in protective functions."

== Death ==
On September 6, 2020, Zeese died suddenly from a heart attack.

== Electoral history ==
Maryland United States Senate election results, 2006
Party	Candidate	Votes	%	±%
Democratic	Ben Cardin	965,477	54.21	−9.0
Republican	Michael Steele	787,182	44.19	+7.5
Green	Kevin Zeese	27,564	1.55	n/a
Write-in		916	0.05	0
Majority		178,295	100.00	
Turnout		1,781,139		
Democratic hold		Swing		

== Bibliography ==
- Drug Testing Legal Manual and Practice AIDS, Clark Boardman Callaghan (1996)
- Drug Law Strategies and Tactics, with Eve Zeese, Clark Boardman Callaghan (1993)
- Drug Prohibition and the Conscience of Nations, with Arnold Trebach, The Drug Policy Foundation (1990)
