= Kansas Green Party =

Kansas affiliate of the Green Party

- Headquarters: Lawrence, KS 66044
- Ideology: Green politics
- Political position: Left-wing
- National affiliation: Green Party of the United States
- Colors: Green

Website
- kansasgreenparty.org

The Kansas Green Party is an independent political party in Kansas. It is the Kansas state affiliate of the Green Party of the United States. The party meets in Topeka, Lawrence, and Kansas City.

== Elections ==
=== 2020 ===
Green Party presidential nominee Howie Hawkins' name did not appear on the general election ballot; however, Kansas was one of five states in which voters could write-in his name. As a write-in candidate, the Hawkins-Walker ticket received 669 votes in the state. In an interview during the campaign, Hawkins argued that in Kansas, among other traditionally Republican states, the Green Party had the potential to be "the second party starting out" because of Democrats' underperformance, and that in such states it's in Green candidates' best interest to "run as a Green on the full program".

== Ballot access ==
=== 2019 ===
In 2019, a bill was introduced into committee in the Kansas legislature to reduce the number of signatures required for third parties to attain ballot access, by halving the number of required signatures and doubling the length of time in which to collect them. The Kansas Green Party supported the bill, with party co-chair Nick Blessing observing that ballot access grants third parties the ability to run candidates for many different offices without petitioning for each individually, and pointing to the fact that nearly 60 state House seats had been uncontested in the last election.

=== 2021 ===
In February 2021, the Kansas Green Party announced that, starting on April 22, 2021, they would begin the process of petitioning for party status. This made the party the second since 1998 to start the petition process, and the first since 2011.

== Presidential nominee results ==
Year	Nominee	Votes	%	Source
1996	Ralph Nader (write-in)	914	0.09%	
2000	Ralph Nader	36,086	3.44%	
2004	David Cobb (write-in)	33	0%	
2008	Cynthia McKinney (write-in)	35	0%	
2012	Jill Stein (write-in)	714	0.06%	
2016	Jill Stein	23,506	2.00%	
2020	Howie Hawkins (write-in)	669	0.05%	

== List of chairs ==
Chairs of the Kansas Green Party Council
Co-Chair	Tenure
Isabella Ticer	2017 – 2018
Nick Blessing	March 2017 – Present
Teresa Wilke	2020 – 2024
Kent Rowe	2020 — Present
