= StudentLoanJustice.org =

StudentLoanJustice.org is a US grassroots organization founded in 2005 by Alan Collinge with the goal of reforming predatory lending practices in the American student loan industry.

== Purpose ==
Specifically, the organization calls for the return of standard consumer protections to student loans, including bankruptcy protections and statutes of limitations. The organization also calls for the removal of exemptions given uniquely to the student loan industry from Fair Debt Collection Practices Act, the Truth in Lending Act, and state usury laws. StudentLoanJustice.org has 16,080 members in its Facebook group and additional members in its various mailers and lists.

The website contains information about the student loan industry, including the Higher Education Act of 1997, which it says allowed private lending agencies to impose what it describes as "draconian" punitive measures upon borrowers. It also publishes stories from graduates who have had difficulty with student loan companies.

In 2007, StudentLoanJustice formed a Political Action Committee of the same name, and was credited by staff for then-Senator Hillary Clinton as being the motivating force behind the Student Borrower Bill of Rights Act of 2006.

StudentLoanJustice.org or its members have been covered by a number of newspapers, radio, and television shows, including The New York Times, The Los Angeles Times, National Public Radio, The Washington Post, The National Review, The Wall Street Journal, Public Broadcasting System, Fortune Magazine, Businessweek, Fox Television, CNN, CBS News, Democracy Now!, The Chicago Sun-Times, and others.

In 2008, Collinge was selected by CNN/Money Magazine as one of seven Heroes for that year. In 2009, Collinge published The Student Loan Scam: The Most Oppressive Debt in U.S. History and How We Can Fight Back (Beacon Press).
