= RightNOW Women =

RightNOW Women PAC is a volunteer organization and political action committee helping elect Republican women to federal office. They support women candidates from all walks of life who share common beliefs in economic growth, individual responsibility, a strong national defense, access to the best education and quality healthcare at a reasonable cost. The PAC's leadership regularly contribute to discourse on recruiting and electing republican women to elected office. RightNOW Women PAC focuses on engaging young professionals in their 20s and 30s to support female candidates through low dollar, high volume fundraising events. RightNOW Women seeks to complement other like-minded organizations by developing a national grassroots movement, connected through social media.

The PAC's endorsement and events often leads to national coverage for their attendees or endorsements.
