= Margaret Flowers =

American activist and pediatrician

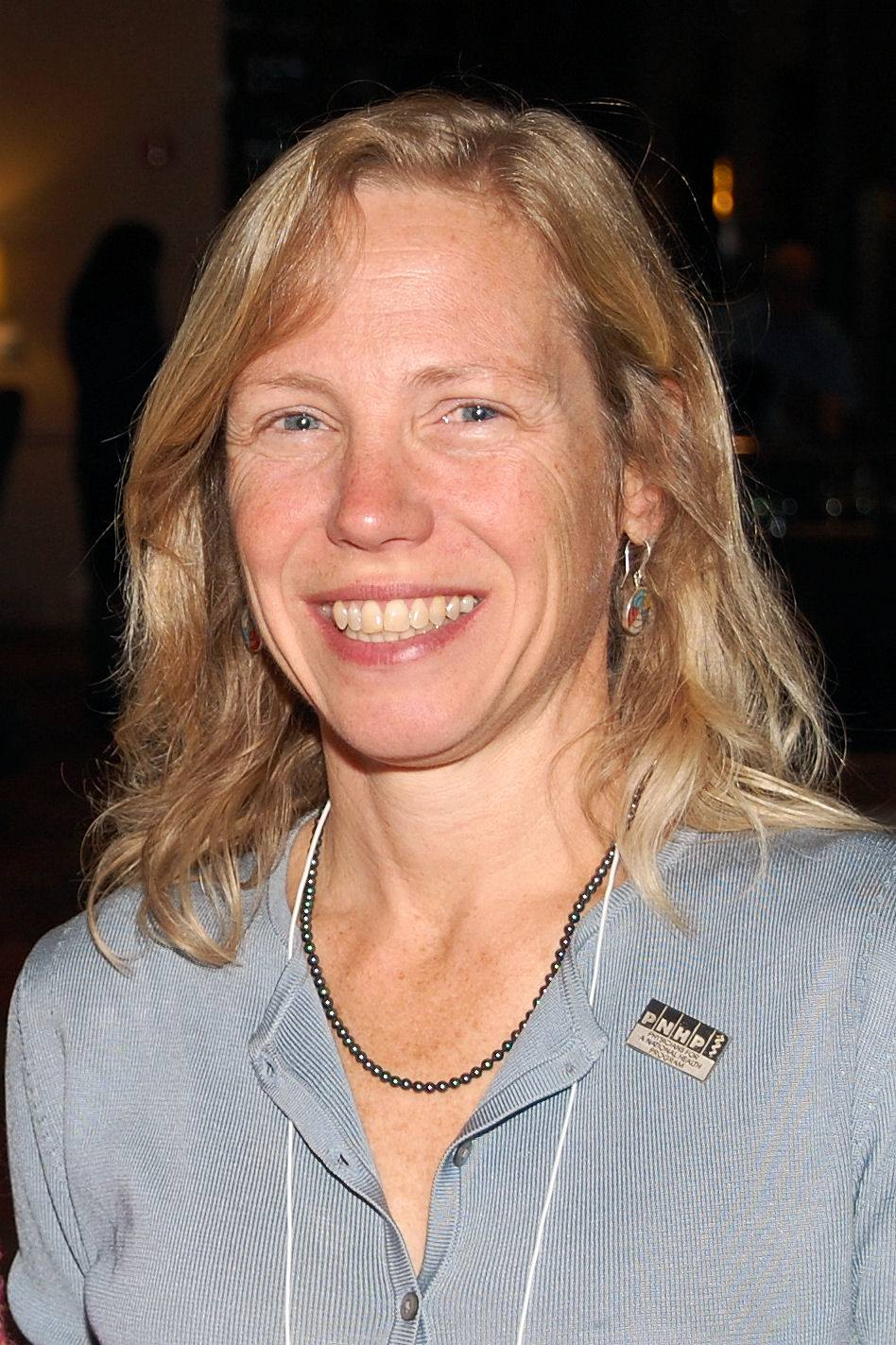
- Flowers in 2016

Co-Chair of the Green Party
- In office August 2, 2018 – 2020

Personal details
- Born: November 8, 1962 (age 63) Kansas City, Missouri, U.S.
- Party: Green
- Domestic partner: Kevin Zeese (1955–2020)
- Education: Georgetown University, (BS); University of Maryland School of Medicine, (MD)
- Profession: Activist, pediatrician

Margaret Flowers (born November 8, 1962) is an American pediatrician, public health advocate and activist. After 17 years of practicing medicine, she became an advocate for a single-payer insurance system.

Flowers is an adviser to the board of Physicians for a National Health Program, serving as a Congressional Fellow during the health reform process in 2009-2010 and is co-chair of the Maryland chapter. She was co-chair of the Green Party of the United States until 2020.

== Early life ==
Flowers was born in Kansas City, Missouri in 1962. She received her bachelor's degree in biology in 1986 at Georgetown University. In 1990 she received her Doctorate in Medicine from University of Maryland School of Medicine and completed her residency in pediatrics from Johns Hopkins Hospital.

== Career ==
=== Pediatrics ===
From 1990 to 2007, Flowers practiced medicine first as director of pediatrics at a rural hospital and then in private practice. Flowers left her practice to advocate full time for single payer Medicare for All healthcare.

=== Activism ===
Flowers joined Physicians for a National Health Program, serving as a Congressional Fellow, advocating for a single payer insurance system to expand Medicare to cover everyone.

In 2009, she was arrested at a Senate Roundtable on Health Insurance for standing and speaking up on behalf of the single payer option, as no representative for that type of insurance was invited to the roundtable discussion. She said in an interview on being arrested, "Our first goal was to have a seat at the table….If we couldn't get a seat, at least we could expose the insincerity of the current attempt at healthcare reform and show that single payer was actively being excluded."

In 2010, Flowers wrote a letter to President Barack Obama explaining her position on healthcare and offering Medicare as a model for a better system. After multiple attempts by Flowers and her colleagues to deliver the letter directly to the White House, they were arrested for their refusal to leave the premises.

In 2011, Flowers organized with the Occupy Movement in Washington, D.C., which evolved into her work at Popular Resistance in 2013, which she co-directed with Kevin Zeese.

=== Media ===
In 2012, Flowers launched the show Clearing the FOG with her partner Kevin Zeese on We Act Radio in Anacostia, and today is presented on Pacifica Radio as a podcast.

=== Senate campaign ===
Flowers ran for U.S. Senate in Maryland for the 2016 election, where she received over 3% of the vote or approximately 90,000 votes.

=== Green Party ===
From 2018 to 2020, Flowers served on the national Green Party's Steering Committee as one of its seven co-chairs, leading the party.

== Awards and recognition ==
Flowers received the 2020 Women and Media Award, alongside five other women, by the Women's Institute for Freedom of the Press for her contributions to media democracy.

== Electoral history ==
United States Senate election in Maryland, 2016
Party	Candidate	Votes	%	±%
Democratic	Chris Van Hollen	1,659,907	60.89%	−1.30%
Republican	Kathy Szeliga	972,557	35.67%	−0.08%
Green	Margaret Flowers	89,970	3.30%	+2.17%
n/a	Write-ins	3,736	0.14%	+0.03%
Total votes		2,726,170	100.00%	N/A

== See also ==
- Green Party of the United States
- Medicare for All
