= Democracy Rising =

American organization founded in 2001

Democracy Rising was an American organization founded in 2001 to oppose corporate corruption. It later became an organization opposed to the military actions of the United States against Iraq and, after the Iraq War, to promote an exit strategy to end the occupation of Iraq.

It began with three volunteers, Jason Kafoury (National Coordinator), Matthew Zawisky (National Organizer), and Richard Martin (National Operations Manager and Web Administrator). It collaboratively organized stadium and smaller sized manifestations called "Super Rallies" across the Eastern United States (Tampa, Florida, Wall Street, New York, Buffalo, New York, Trenton, New Jersey, and others) under the umbrella of a 501 (c)(4) non-profit organization (US Federal EIN # 54-2043043) that had been founded by Ralph Nader. It focused on corporate corruption during the run up and aftershock of the Enron debacle, and eventually merged into an anti-war group led by Kevin Zeese following the 2004 elections. At that time, it changed its website domain from a "democracyrising.org" to "democracyrising.us".

It was then that it became a member of United for Peace and Justice. Its web site hosted Ralph Nader's interactive blog and one by Kevin Zeese, director of the organization and a 2006 U.S. Senate candidate in Maryland. The organization folded in late 2007.
