= History of the Green Party of the United States =

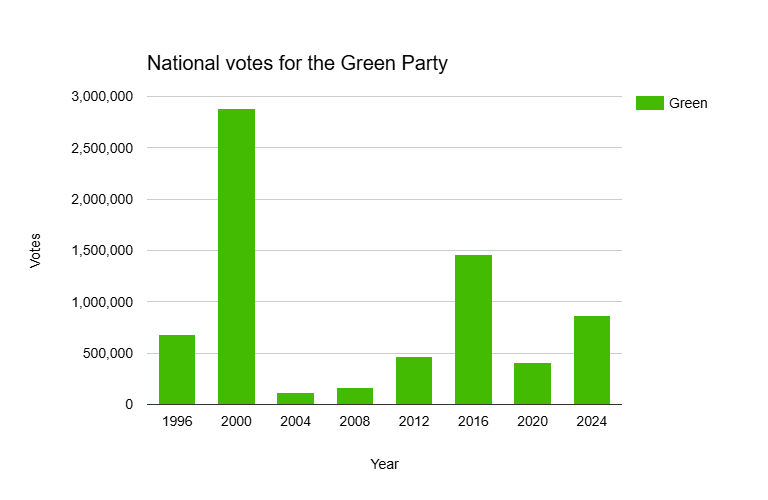
National votes for the Greens at presidential elections.

The Green Party of the United States originated in 1984 when 62 people from the U.S. gathered in St. Paul, Minnesota and founded the first national Green organization—the Committees of Correspondence. The Green Party of the U.S. has gone through several evolutions, from debating theory and praxis in the 1980s, to starting state parties in the 1990s, to the founding of a national political party (recognized by the Federal Elections Commission) in the 2000s.

== 1980s ==
=== Green Committees of Correspondence, 1984 ===
At the first North American Bio-regional Congress in May 1984 (convened by David Haenke of the Ozark Area Community Congress and in Missouri) a group was focused on the green movement in the United States. They approved a Green Movement Committee statement "concerning the formation of a Green political organization in the USA." From this initial gathering, a larger meeting was planned for August 1984.

In August 1984, 62 people met at Macalester College in St. Paul, Minnesota and founded the Committees of Correspondence (or CoC, so named after the Committees of Correspondence of the American Revolutionary War).

The three-day meeting included activists from peace, ecology and justice groups; veterans of the women's civil rights and community movements; and farmers, community leaders, church activists and teachers. There were social ecologists, deep ecologists, eco-feminists, anarchists, socialists and more.

The organizing committee was made up of professor Charlene Spretnak of California, Harry Boyte, Catherine Burton, Gloria Goldberg and David Haenke; and they invited 200 people from 27 issues areas.

The CoC was broadly formed to organize local Green groups and work toward creating a Green political organization in the U.S., including the forming of an interim Inter-Regional Committee (IC).

The meeting also started the creation of the Green Ten Key Values, as the new organization's guiding principles. Differing accounts of this process have been written by Mark Satin and Spretnak.

The first CoC clearinghouse was established in late 1984 in St. Paul with Harry Boyte, but was hampered by a division at the Macalester meeting as to its role, with a division between those who favored coordinated decentralization and those favoring radical decentralization, to the degree that the clearinghouse be a mail drop and information resource, but not an outreach vehicle.

The first U.S. Greens to run for public office, 1985, were Wes Hare for Mayor of Chapel Hill, North Carolina and Richard D. Wolff and Joel Schecter for mayor and alderman of New Haven, Connecticut. The first U.S. Greens to be elected were David Conley, County Board of Supervisors, Douglas County, Wisconsin and Frank Koehn, County Board of Supervisors, Bayfield County, Wisconsin. Also in 1986, Greg Gerritt would become the first Green to run for a state legislature, running for the Maine House of Representatives.

At the December 1985 IC meeting in Kansas City, the decision was taken that both the IC and the clearinghouse should actively support organizing efforts through a number of services. The clearinghouse was moved to Kansas City where there was a local organisation (the Prairie Greens) to actively support it. At that time, IC Bulletin, the CoC newsletter and the Green Letter, a newsletter published by Jerry Gwathney, were the main channels of information.

=== First National Green Gathering, 1987 ===
The first "National Green Gathering" was held in July 1987, at Hampshire College in Amherst, MA and was entitled "Building the Green Movement - A National Conference for a New Politics." The conference brochure described it as an educational conference, not a decision-making conference.

Over 600 were in attendance. Some of the tensions within the U.S. Green movement were on display at the time - 'party vs. movement', 'deep ecology vs. social ecology' and 'New Left vs. New Age.' Featured speakers included Grace Lee Boggs, Murray Bookchin, Walt Bresette, Guy Chichester, Barbara Epstein, Danny Moses, John Rensenbrink and Ynestra King. Workshops included a session on Independent Political Action. Other well-known Greens in attendance included Dee Berry, Kathy Christensen, Greta Gaard, Gerald Goldfarb, Howie Hawkins, Phil Hill, Myra Levy, Roberto Mendoza, Lorna Salzman, Brian Tokar and Nancy Vogl.

=== Strategic Policy Approaches in Key Areas (SPAKA) ===
After the Amherst gathering, the focus shifted to developing a set of Green policies and approaches based upon the Key Values, that might further define and unite U.S. Greens. At the August 1987 IC meeting in Kansas City, Green Letter editor Margo Adair and John Rensenbrink of Maine were selected as principal coordinators of what would come to be called the SPAKA process - Strategic Policy Approaches in Key Areas.

The process started with a call for subjects, which went out to all the Green locals, and many others. The responses to were bundled into 11 major categories. Later they were bundled into 19 categories: Energy, Forest and Forestry, Life Forms, Materials Use and Waste Management, Water/Air, General Economic Analysis, Finance, Land Use, Politics, Social Justice, Eco-Philosophy, Spirituality, Education, Food and Agriculture, Health, Peace and Non-violence, Community, Organizing, and Strategy. 190 position papers (SPAKAS) were received.

At the "Green Program Gathering" in Eugene, Oregon, policy approaches were provisionally approved by delegates, in order to send them back to the Green locals (GCoCs) for an additional year of review and input. The final document was approved at the Third Green Gathering, held in Estes Park, Colorado in September 1990.

=== Greening the West, 1988 ===
The Greening the West conference was held in (San Mateo County), California in September/October 1988. It was hosted by the Northern California Greens. More than 1,000 people attended.

The conference featured a workshop entitled "Towards a Green Party of the West: Local and Regional Electoral Strategies", which would turn out to be an early stepping stone in the development of a U.S. Green electoral politics. Some 150 people attended the workshop and moved ahead with forming the Green Party of the West, a support network. That network form the nucleus for the founding of the Green Party of California 15 months later. On December 31, 1991 California Secretary of State March Fong Eu announced that the California Green Party had registered the prerequisite number of voters to be qualify for the 1992 ballot, becoming the California's seventh political party with ballot access.

=== Second National Green Gathering, 1989 ===
The Second National Green Gathering was held in June 1989 in Eugene, OR. It was entitled 'Green Program Gathering', because it centered upon the SPAKA process (Strategic Policy Approaches in Key Areas), to craft a nationally agreed-upon set of Green policy approaches for the GCoC. The local GCoC in Eugene produced a daily Green Tidings, reporting on the Gathering, and contained a daily report on all changes in the 19 subject areas.

Afterward, the Politics Working Group issued a statement encouraging Green electoral activity but recommending that Greens begin running candidates at the local level and only proceed to the state and then to the national level when there were a substantial number of Green officeholders at the level immediately below.

== 1990s ==
The first state Green party to achieve ballot status was Alaska in 1990, based upon Jim Sykes receiving 3.4% for governor of Alaska. The next state parties to qualify came in California, Arizona, New Mexico and Hawaii in 1992, and Maine in 1994.

The first Green to be elected to a state legislature was Audie Bock, who won a March 1999 special election as a state legislator in the California Assembly from the Alameda/Oakland area. In 2000, Bock lost re-election, running as an independent after leaving the Greens just five months after taking office.

=== Greens/Green Party USA, 1991 ===
The Greens had long been divided between fundis who saw electoral politics as corrupting, and supported the notion of an "anti-party party" formed by Petra Kelly and other leaders of the Greens in Germany, and those who saw electoral politics as a crucial engine of social change. This struggle for the direction of the organization culminated in a "compromise agreement", ratified in 1990 at the Greens National Congress in Elkins, West Virginia, in which both strategies would be accommodated within the same 527 political organization renamed the Greens/Green Party USA (G/GPUSA).

The Greens/Green Party USA (Greens/GPUSA) was founded at the August 1991 Green Gathering in Elkins, West Virginia restructuring the Green Committees of Correspondence with the idea that the Green movement and Green Party would operate as part of a single organization. A press conference was held in Washington, DC to announce the new organization, featuring Charles Betz (G/GPUSA Coordinating Committee member), Howie Hawkins and Joni Whitmore (chair, Green Party of Alaska), as well as Hilda Mason of the D.C. Statehood Party.

=== Association of State Green Parties, 1996 ===
After the Elkins meeting in 1991, there was a committee tasked with examining the options for an eventual Green Party. The committee produced a report with contributions from 6 authors. Greg Gerritt's suggestion was to create an Association of State Green Parties based on sovereign state parties, as all political parties are organised in the USA. The reaction of the GPUSA to this suggestion was to throw Gerritt out of the GPUSA. In 1992, those sympathetic to this vision established the Green Politics Network.

In the aftermath of the first Green presidential campaign in 1996, 62 Greens from 30 states gathered in Middleburg, Virginia in November 1996 to found the Association of State Green Parties (ASGP). Green Parties from 13 states were the founding members, and approved its mission: (1) Assist in the development of State Green Parties and (2) Create a legally structured national Green Party. The founding meeting also established a national newsletter Green Pages. This new association generally followed the proposal Gerritt had submitted in early 1992. The ASGP was predominantly focused on establishing state Green Parties and running and electing Greens for public office, even while its member state parties and the individual Greens involved remained involved in issue activism.

=== 1996 presidential election ===
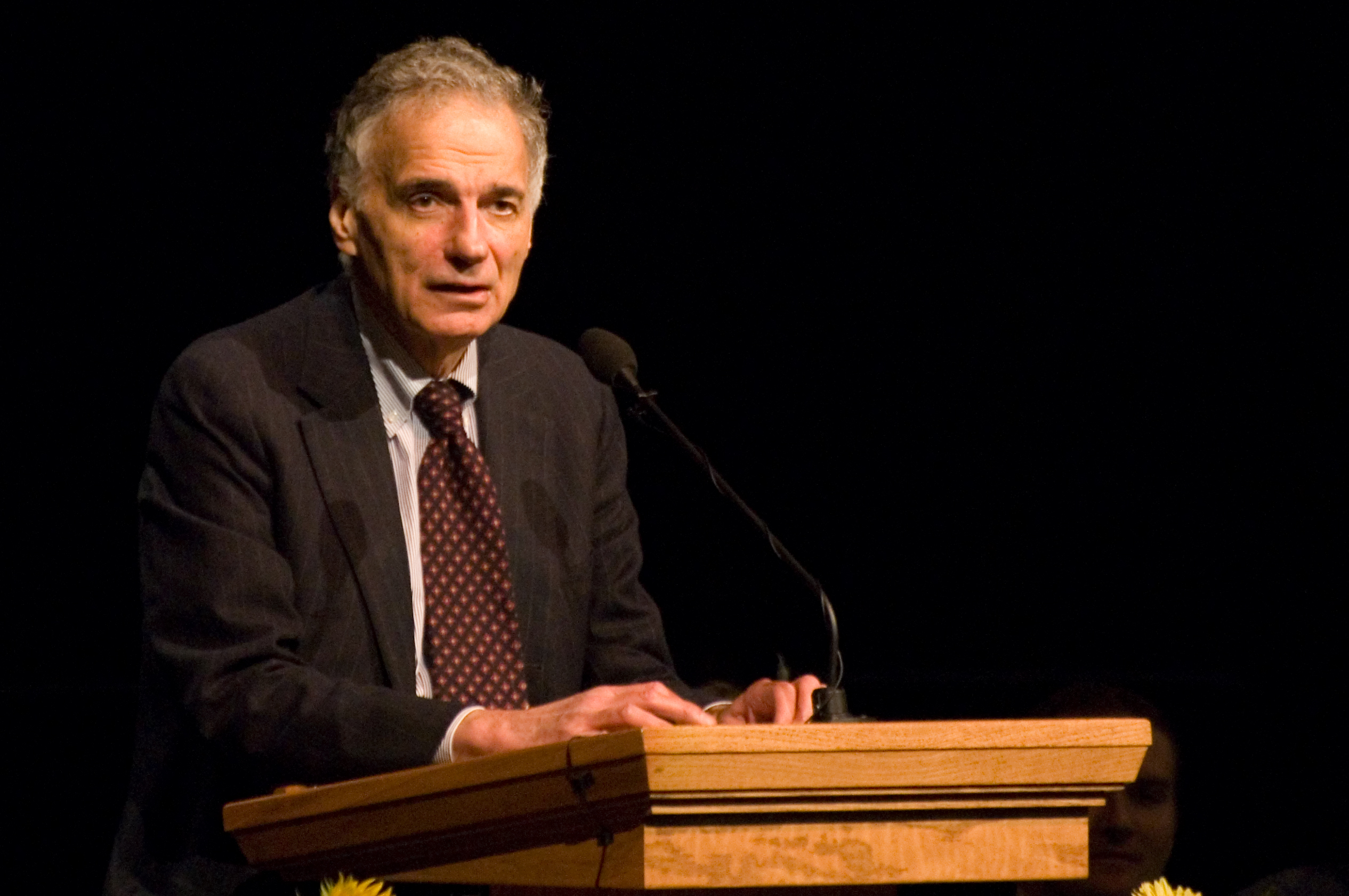
Ralph Nader, 1996 and 2000 nominee

At the 1995 national Green Gathering in Albuquerque, New Mexico, a proposal to put a candidate for president in 40 states was adopted. A significant minority of Greens voiced strong ideological objections (based on the principle of decentralization) to the proposal to become involved in such a large-scale political arena for the first time. Those who wished to run a candidate for president continued to pursue the possibility. Working within their state parties, as well as through an independent organization called Third Parties '96, they convinced Ralph Nader to accept placement on the Green Party of California's March 1996 primary ballot. Eventually, he accepted placement on more ballots but ran a limited campaign with a self-imposed campaign spending limit of $5,000 (which allowed him to avoid being subject to the obligation to file campaign finance statements with the FEC). He chose Winona LaDuke as his vice-presidential candidate. A convention was held at UCLA in Los Angeles on August 20, 1996 where Nader accepted the nomination. Nader/LaDuke were on the ballot in twenty-two states and received 685,297 votes, or 0.7% of all votes cast.

=== Split between G/GPUSA and GPUS ===
From 1997 to 1999, both the ASGP and the Greens/GPUSA aimed to win affiliation of the newly form state parties.

In December 1999, Mike Feinstein and Howie Hawkins met in New York and wrote the Plan for a Single National Green Party, which was more generally known as the Feinstein/Hawkins Proposal. Its idea was to create a single national Green Party from among the ASGP and GPUSA. It had support in both organisations but stalled. In October 2000, the Feinstein/Hawkins proposal was revived and renamed the "Boston Agreement". The Boston agreement was approved was by the ASGP at its December 2000 meeting in Hiawassee, GA, but did not pass at the April 2001 G/GPUSA Congress. This caused a schism in membership among the G/GPUSA from which they never recovered. In an article on the G/GPUSA's website, the organization characterized the split between itself and the ASGP as akin to the fundi–realo split in the German Greens, with itself being the fundi wing and ASGP the realos.

At its July 2001 meeting in Santa Barbara, the ASGP voted to change its name to "The Green Party of the United States" and apply for recognition of National Committee status by the Federal Election Commission, which it was granted later that year and has retained since. The Green Party was formally announced in June 2001.

== 2000s ==
In November 2002, John Eder's election to the Maine House of Representatives marked the first Green Party state legislator in the United States elected in a regular election. His party designation was "Green Independent". In 2004, he won re-election. However, he was defeated in 2006.

In January 2003, New Jersey Democrat, Matt Ahearn, became the first sitting state legislator to change affiliation to Green. He was defeated in November 2003 in his bid for re-election.

In November 2008, Richard Carroll was elected to the Arkansas House of Representatives. However, Carroll announced on April 29, 2009, his departure from the Greens, and registered as a Democrat, citing ideological differences that were more in line of the Democratic Party.

=== 2000 presidential election ===
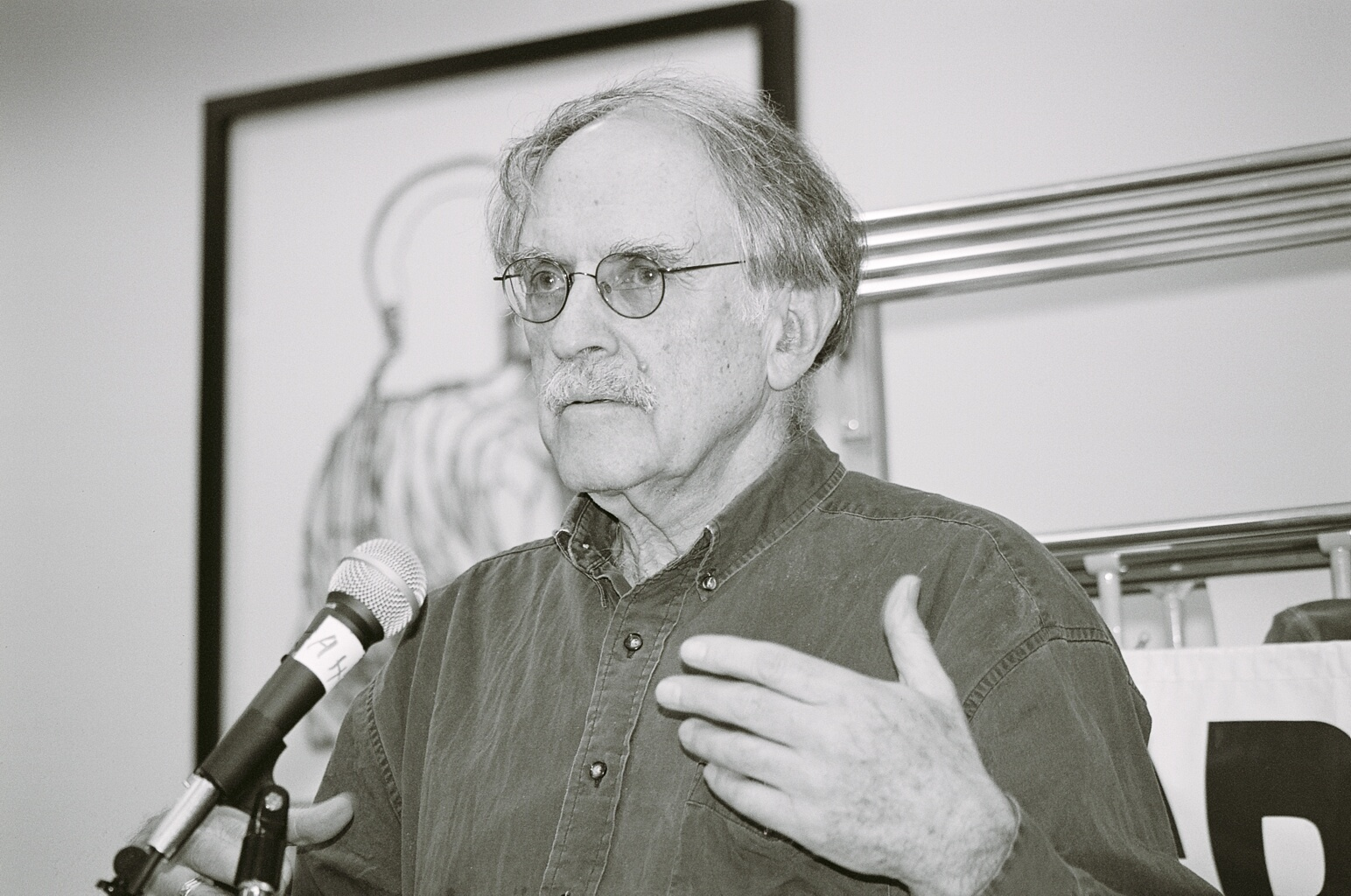
Psychoanalyst Joel Kovel sought the Green Party's presidential nomination in 2000

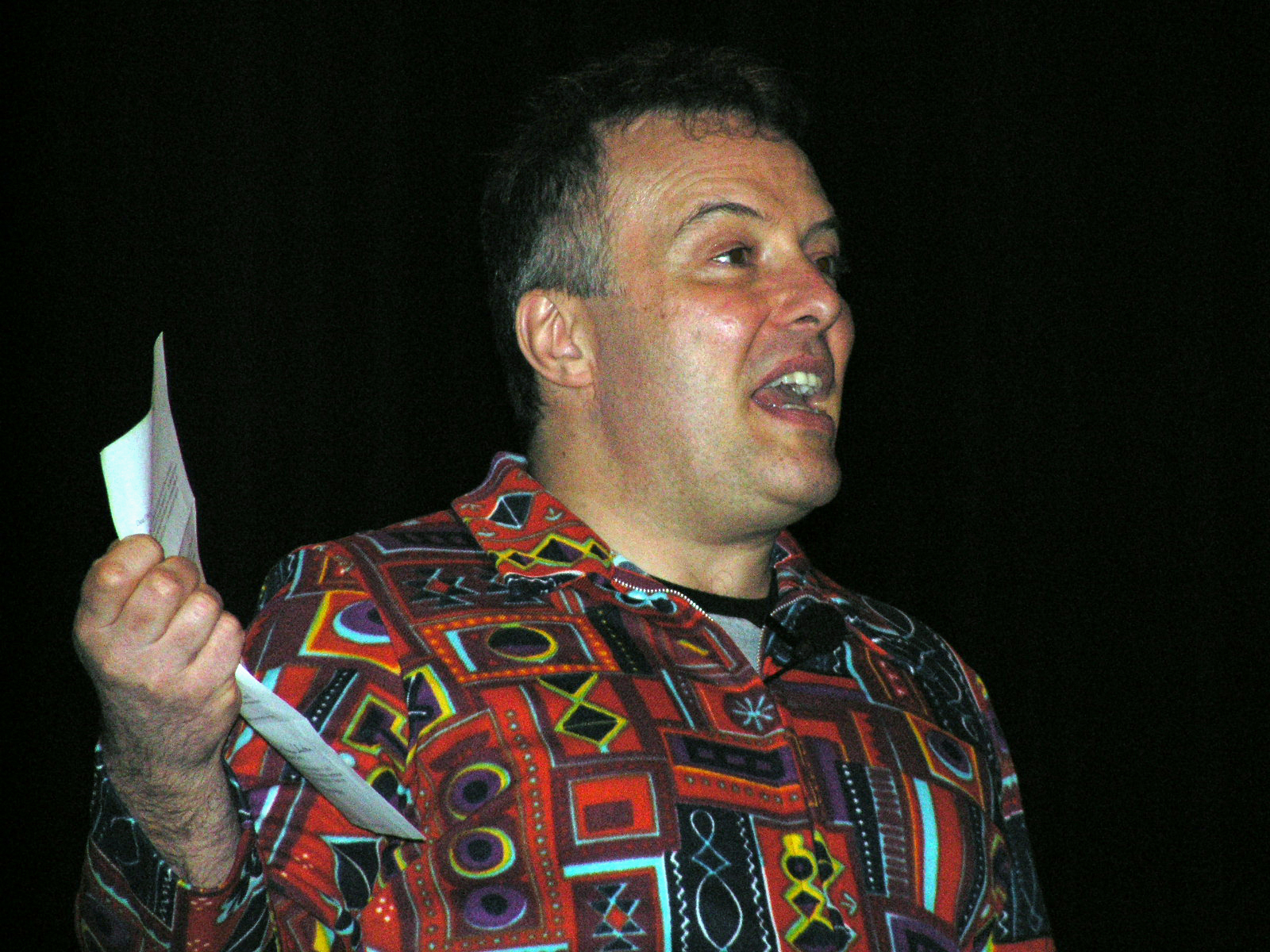
Musician Jello Biafra ran for the Green Party's presidential nomination in 2000, and has run for other offices with the Green Party.

In September 1998, the New Mexico Green Party proposed that an ASGP Presidential Exploratory Committee be established for the 2000 elections. The ASGP Coordinating Committee agreed and in December the ASGP Steering Committee appointed a seven-person committee. In February 1999 it sent out a letter questionnaire to potential candidates.

At it June convention in Denver, the ASGP nominated Ralph Nader and Winona LaDuke for president and vice-president. The pair appeared on 44 state ballots and received 2,883,105 votes, or 2.7 percent of all votes cast.

Due to Republican candidate George W. Bush's tiny margin of victory in Florida and New Hampshire, some Democrats accused Nader of "spoiling" the election of Al Gore, the Democratic Party nominee.

=== 2004 presidential election ===
In the 2004 presidential election, the candidate of the Green Party of the United States for President was Texas attorney and GPUS legal counsel David Cobb, and its candidate for vice-president was labor activist, Pat LaMarche of Maine.

In the Summer of 2003, the Greens began a debate on party presidential strategy. Interest groups were pressuring the Green Party and Ralph Nader not to run a presidential ticket. In response, a section of U.S. Greens issued the statement "Green & Growing: 2004 in Perspective".

On Christmas Eve 2003, Ralph Nader declared that he would not seek the Green Party's nomination for president in 2004, and in February 2004 announced his intention to run as an independent. However he did seek endorsement (rather than the nomination) of the Green Party and other third parties.

The Cobb-LaMarche ticket in 2004 appeared on 28 of the 51 ballots around the country, down from the Greens' 44 in 2000; the Nader-Camejo ticket in 2004 appeared on 35 ballots. In 2004, Cobb was on the ballot in California (and Nader was not), whereas Nader was on the ballot in New York (and Cobb was not).

Cobb-LaMarche received 119,859 votes.

==== Endorsement versus nomination controversy ====
Nader announced that he would run as an independent candidate (he had never become a party member). Later he explained that he was not seeking the Green Party's nomination, but would (as an independent) seek the party's "endorsement". Factions within the party which had been lining up behind potential candidates solidified into a camp favoring a Nader endorsement and a camp favoring nominating an actual Green Party member (the latter favoring primarily David Cobb).

On June 26, 2004, the Green National Convention nominated Cobb, who promised to focus on building the party. Just over a third of the delegates voted "No Nominee" with the intent to later vote for a Nader endorsement. Pat LaMarche of Maine was nominated for vice-president. Cobb and Nader emphasized different strategies. Cobb promised to run a "strategic states" campaign based on the preferences and needs of the individual state Green parties; as a result, Cobb campaigned heavily in some battleground states and not in others. Nader intended to run a national multiparty ticket uniting the Greens with other parties.

After David Cobb received the party's 2004 presidential nomination at the Green National Convention in Milwaukee, apparently in a show of unity, Nader's vice presidential running mate, Peter Camejo, said, "I'm going to walk out of here arm in arm with David Cobb." However, the nominating convention and the political discussions and maneuvering before it generated considerable controversy within the party. At issue was the apportionment of delegates and the method used to determine how many delegates each state received. The group Greens for Democracy and Independence, inspired by the principles in Peter Camejo's Avocado Declaration (in part a response to Nader's declaration not to seek the Green nomination), arose and became an organizing group for Greens disaffected with the internal policies and procedures of the GPUS, and sought reforms.

=== 2006 elections ===
The Greens fielded candidates in a number of races in 2006. The party won 66 races nationwide, including 21 in California and 11 in Wisconsin. One of the biggest victories included the election of Gayle McLaughlin as mayor in Richmond, California. Richmond now has become the first city with over 100,000 residents to have a Green mayor. In Maine, Pat LaMarche received nearly 10% of the vote in the state's gubernatorial race and the Maine Green Independent Party also won two seats on the Portland City Council. In the Illinois governor's race, candidate Rich Whitney received 10%, making the Green Party one of only three legally established, statewide political parties in Illinois. In Colorado's First District, Tom Kelly received 21% of the vote in his run for the U.S. Congress. However, the party lost its only elected state representative, John Eder.

The Green Party of Pennsylvania, faced with an exceptionally high ballot access petition requirement, chose to run Green Party organizer Carl Romanelli for U.S. Senate. The race between the incumbent, Rick Santorum, and the son of a former governor, Bob Casey, was already prominent on the national scene. Although a strong volunteer petition effort gathered 20,000 to 30,000 signatures, it was clear that paid petitioners would be needed to clear the 67,000 signature threshold. After Romanelli filed 99,000 signatures the Democrats challenged the petitions, and the judge ordered the lawyers and nine representatives from each side to work full-time reviewing signatures line by line, which continued for six weeks. Near the end of September, the judge abruptly ruled that Romanelli would be removed from the ballot. Following the controversial precedent set in the 2004 challenge to Nader's petitions in Pennsylvania, Romanelli and his lawyer were later assessed $81,000 for court costs and the challenger's expenses. The Green Party, having no statewide candidates on the ballot to get the required vote threshold, lost its "minor party" status in Pennsylvania, leaving only two parties still recognized by the state.

Approximately 8.7 million Americans voted for withdrawal of U.S. troops from Iraq and for impeachment resolutions on local and state ballots that were initiated or supported by Greens. Troop withdrawal initiatives won in 34 of 42 localities in Wisconsin, including Milwaukee, Madison, and La Crosse, and all 11 communities in Illinois, including Chicago. Of 139 cities and towns in Massachusetts voting on the troop withdrawal measures, only a handful voted nay on initiatives demanding that Congress and the White House end the war immediately.

=== 2008 presidential election ===
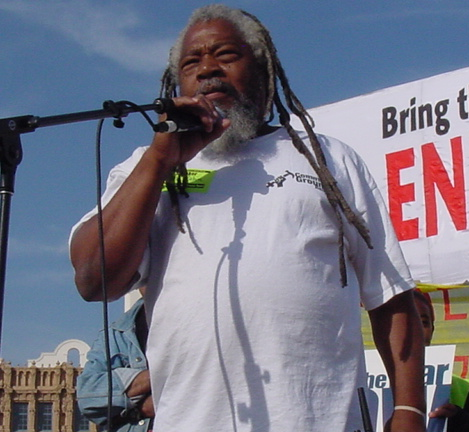
Malik Rahim, former Black Panther Party activist, ran for Congress in 2008 with the Green Party.

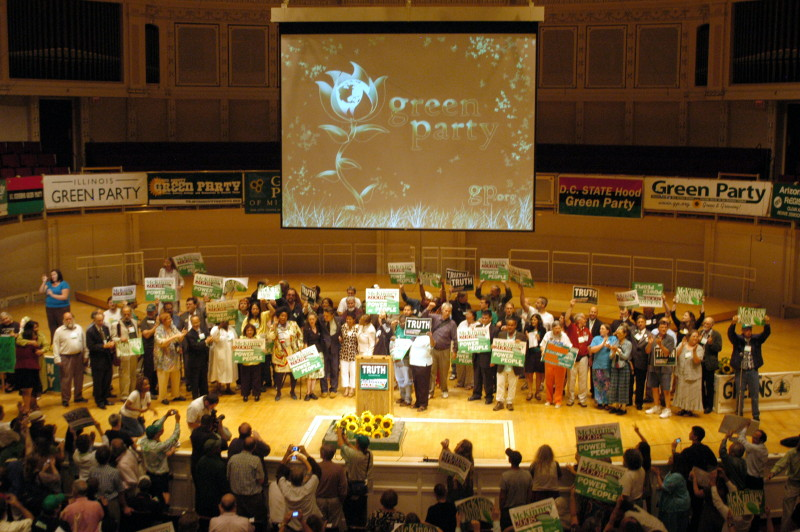
Cynthia McKinney was nominated for president at the 2008 Green National Convention

In the 2008 Green primary, the following candidates sought the Green nomination:

- Former six-term congresswoman Cynthia McKinney of Georgia
- Jesse Johnson of West Virginia, Mountain Party 2004 nominee for Governor of WV and 2006 nominee for U.S. Senate
- Kent Mesplay of California, environmentalist and CA Delegate to the Green National Committee
- Kat Swift of Texas, co-chair of the Green Party of Texas and 2007 Green Party nominee for San Antonio City Council

Former Green Party presidential nominee and 2004 independent candidate Ralph Nader announced in early 2008 that he would seek the presidency for the fourth time, running with San Francisco lawyer and Green politician Matt Gonzalez as his running mate. However, in late February, Nader and Gonzalez declined to seek the Green Party's nomination.

The Green Party of Minnesota hosted a Green Party Presidential Forum on Saturday January 5 in Minneapolis. It was followed by a January 13 presidential debate in San Francisco, co-sponsored by the Green Party of Alameda County, the San Francisco Green Party and the National Delegates Committee of the Green Party of California. About 800 people attended, with most paying a suggested donation of $10 to $20 to attend. The three-hour event was co-moderated by Cindy Sheehan and Aimee Allison.

Green Party primaries in Arkansas, California, Illinois, and Massachusetts were held on February 5, 2008. California and Massachusetts were won by Ralph Nader, who had not yet announced if he would seek the Green nomination, while Illinois was won by Cynthia McKinney. Washington, DC held the DC Statehood Green Party primary on February 12, which was won by McKinney, as was the February 19 Wisconsin Green primary. On May 13, McKinney won the Nebraska primary with 57% of the vote.

At the party's 2008 National Convention on July 12, 2008, in Chicago, IL, McKinney won a majority of the GNC delegate votes. Therefore, the Green Party nominated former six-term congresswoman Cynthia McKinney of Georgia as its 2008 presidential nominee and Rosa Clemente as its 2008 vice presidential nominee

In the general, McKinney received 161,797 votes [0.12%] nationwide.

== 2010s ==
=== 2012 presidential election ===
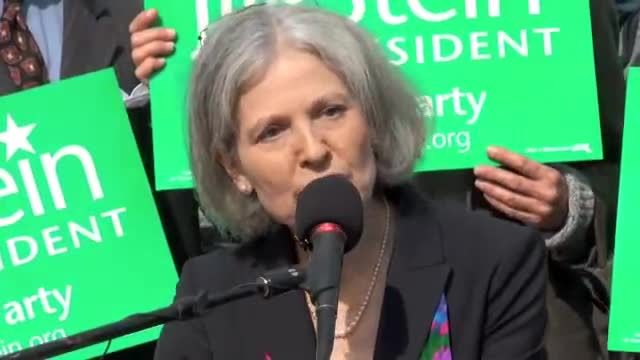
Jill Stein launching her campaign bid 2012.

On July 14, the Green Party nominated physician Jill Stein from Massachusetts and Pennsylvanian social organizer Cheri Honkala as their presidential and vice presidential candidates. Centerpieces of her campaign included the Green New Deal, nationalization, free secondary and higher education, and repealing the USA PATRIOT Act. The campaign became the second ever Green Party presidential campaign to qualify for primary season federal matching funds from the Election Commission.

Excluded from the first presidential debate of the cycle, Stein marched in protest in an Occupy Denver protest on October 3. She and Honkala were arrested for disorderly conduct after protesting outside of the second debate in a sit-in. Stein participated in an alternative a series of debates throughout her campaign, first one against Gary Johnson (Libertarian) on October 18 and then Virgil Goode (Constitution) and Rocky Anderson (Justice) in a debate held by the Free & Equal Elections Foundation on October 23. On November 4, Stein debated the same three candidates once again and on November 5, Stein and Johnson debated for a final time.

On election day, the Stein/Honkala ticket would earn 469,501 votes (0.36%), tripling the Green Party's performance from 2008. Stein received over 1% of the popular vote in three states: 1.3% in Maine, 1.1% in Oregon, and 1.0% in Alaska.

=== 2013-2016 ===
In the federal elections taking place across the country, the Green Party was unable to attain any victory for a seat in the House or Senate. Through popular vote, the best performance in the senate races was that of Emily Sanchez in Texas, who received 54,701 votes. Despite this, she would place fourth and only receive around 1% of the vote. Percentagewise, Mark Swaney running in Arkansas did the best, earning nearly 2%.

In the elections for the House, Antonio Diaz received the most votes for a member of the party, garnering over 27,000. He would come in a distant second to Lamar Smith, the Republican victor. They were running in the twenty-first district, while Paul Blair ran in the third. He would receive the highest percentage for Greens in federal elections this year, gaining 18%.

The worst performances from the party were Andrew Groff in Delaware (4,560 votes, Senate) and William Edstrom in New York (568 votes, House).

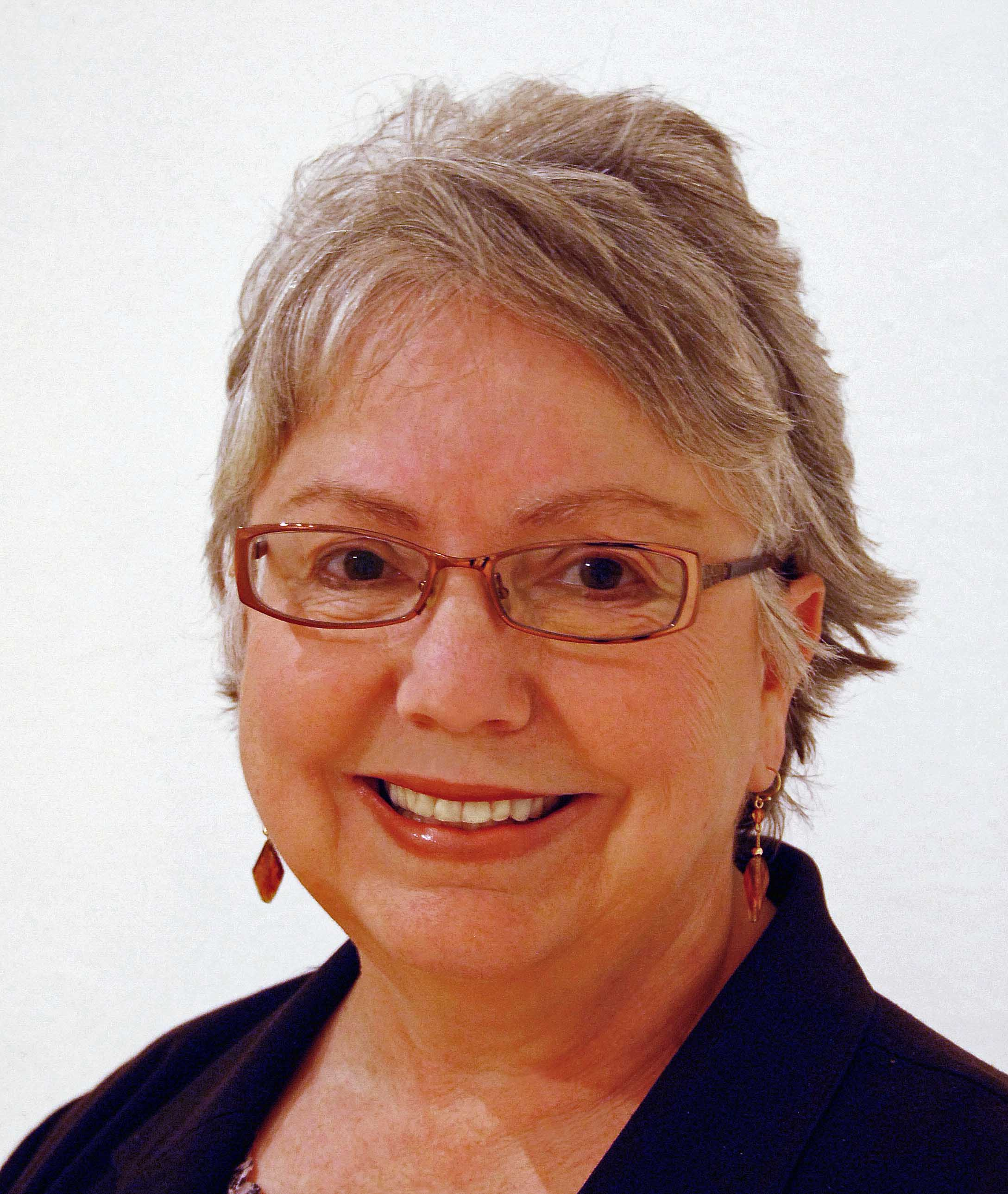
Gayle McLaughlin was elected to the RIchmond City Council after previously serving as their first Green mayor.

In six states, Green Party candidates attempted to become governor. All candidates lost their races, but the performance of Howie Hawkins in New York allowed the Green Party to keep ballot access for the next four years. In State legislature elections, no Green candidates won any election.

In Richmond, California, term-limited Green mayor Gayle McLaughlin was again elected to the Richmond City Council.

In the Middle East, the Green Party supports the 2015 Iran nuclear deal to decrease sanctions while limiting Iran's capacity to make nuclear weapons. The party condemned the Twelve-Day War, proclaiming themselves as a party of peace and the Democrats and Republicans as militaristic. When Israel and the United States again went to war with Iran nine months later, three state parties denounced the war and called it illegal under international law.

=== 2016 presidential election ===
This map shows the percentage of the popular vote Jill Stein received in each county (2016) (with a max vote share of 4.5%).

On June 22, 2015, Jill Stein officially declared her campaign for president in an exclusive Democracy Now! interview. Stein once again centered the Green New Deal in her campaign, stating in the interview, "So, our top plank really is a Green New Deal to transform our economy to a green economy..."

On August 1, 2016, Stein selected activist Ajamu Baraka to be her running mate.

In 2016, the Green Party garnered 1,457,218 votes, gaining over 1% of the vote (1.1%) for the first time since 2000.

Stein got higher support from counties and precincts with a high percentage of Native American population. For instance, in Sioux County (North Dakota, 84.1% Native American), Stein gained her best county-wide result: 10.4% of the votes. In Rolette County (also North Dakota, 77% Native American), she got 4.7% of the votes. Other majority Native American counties where Stein did above state average are Menominee (WI), Roosevelt (MT) and several precincts in Alaska.

Democrats sharply criticized Stein for her personal investments in index funds that included defense contractors, Big Tobacco, and Big Oil. Stein defended this as a retirement investment in a standard index fund, which was as systemically compromised as the rest of the American economy.

Politico and Newsweek stated that Russian state actors covertly promoted Stein and other Green Party candidates on Facebook prior to the 2016 elections. NBC News reported that a "growing body of evidence [exists] that [shows] the Russians worked to boost the Stein campaign as part of the effort to siphon support away from Democratic candidate Hillary Clinton and tilt the election to Trump." NBC News additionally documented over 100 instances where Stein appeared on Russian state media, receiving favorable coverage. The United States Senate's probe into Russian election interference investigated Jill Stein and the Green Party for potential collusion. In 2015, Stein was photographed dining at the same table as Russian president Vladimir Putin at the RT 10th anniversary gala in Moscow. Stein contended that she had no contact with Putin at the dinner and described the situation as a "non-event". One of Green Party's 2016 VP candidates, Chris Hedges, worked for RT, while Stein's 2016 running mate, Ajamu Baraka, also often appeared on the network criticizing NATO as "Gangster states". Stein also met with Russia's Foreign Minister Sergey Lavrov at an RT Gala in New York. Stein's 2016 foreign policy positions sometimes mirrored the Russian government in some instances, including the annexation of Crimea. In 2022, Stein condemned Russia's renewed invasion of Ukraine, but claimed that Russia was provoked by NATO's eastward expansion.

== 2020s ==
=== 2020 presidential election ===
Howie Hawkins announced his candidacy for President in the 2020 United States presidential election on April 3, 2019, seeking the Green nomination and of Socialist Party USA.

During the 2020 Green Party presidential primaries, several candidates argued that the Party's removal of unrecognized candidates from its website in November 2019 was being done to help the Hawkins campaign secure the party's nomination.

In July, the 2020 Green Party Nominating Convention named Hawkins the Green nominee. Runner-up Dario Hunter announced that he would run as an independent candidate, criticizing Hawkins for an "imperialist perspective" and "CIA talking points."

=== 2021-2024 ===
On December 27, 2024, politician James Skoufis accused the Green Party of spoiling the 2024 United States Senate election in Pennsylvania in favor of Dave McCormick.

=== 2024 presidential election ===
On August 17, 2024, Jill Stein and Butch Ware officially became the 2024 Green Party's nominees for President and Vice President, winning 267 out of the 287 Green delegate votes at their national convention. Their campaign primarily focused on social justice reforms, labor rights, healthcare, economic restructuring, and demilitarizing. The party also campaigned heavily on ending American aid to Israel during the Gaza war and particularly attacked Democratic candidates Joe Biden and Kamala Harris.

The Stein/Ware ticket came in 3rd place for the first time since 2000, securing 871,222 votes. She received 0.6% of the vote, ahead of 4th place independent Robert F. Kennedy Jr. (who had dropped out, while maintaining ballot placement in certain non-swing states) with 0.5% of the vote, and Libertarian Chase Oliver with 0.4% of the vote.

=== 2025-2028 ===
On February 3, Butch Ware announced that he would be campaigning to become the Governor of California in the 2026 California gubernatorial election; he came in 13th in the primary, with 0.26% of the vote.

On August 29, former presidential candidate Jill Stein spoke at and attended the second annual People's Conference for Palestine. She spoke in favor of the UN imposing an arms embargo, trade boycott, divestment, and utilizing the United Nations Protection Force.

In 2026, Paʻele Kiakona was elected to the Hawaii House of Representatives as a candidate from District 14, His election marked the first time a third party politician has been elected to the Hawaii State Legislature and the fifth time that a member of the Green Party had been elected to any state legislature.

== See also ==
- Green Party of the United States
- Greens/Green Party USA
- Green National Convention
- Green politics
- John Rensenbrink, co-founder of the Maine Green Party and the Green Party of the United States

== Sources and further reading ==
- Against All Odds: The Green Transformation of American Politics. 1999. John Rensenbrink. Leopold Press.
- "The Avocado Declaration," Peter Miguel Camejo. January 1, 2004.
- A Brief History of the Green Party (GPUS official website)
- Crashing the Party: Taking on the Corporate Government in an Age of Surrender. 2002. Ralph Nader. Thomas Dunne Books.
- "GPCA Founding & History", Mike Feinstein, Green Party of California.
- "The Green Alternative", Charlene Spretnak. In Context, Autumn 1984, p. 48.
- Green Party Elections Results
- Green Party Tempest: Weathering the Storm of 2004. 2005. Greg Gerritt.
- Green Politics: The Global Promise. 1984. Fritjof Capra and Charlene Spretnak. EP Dutton.
- Greens for Democracy and Independence (GDI official website)
- "A Historical Look at Green Structure: 1984 to 1992", Jodean Marks. Synthesis/Regeneration 14, Fall 1997.
- A History of the Green Party in the United States. Part 1. Movement or party? (1984-1994). 2018. Alan F. Zundel.
