= Left Green Network =

- Founders: Murray Bookchin; Howie Hawkins
- Founded: April 1988
- Dissolved: 1993
- Newspaper: Left Green Notes
- Ideology: Ecosocialism; Social ecology Libertarian municipalism
- Political position: Far-left

The Left Green Network (LGN) was an ecosocialist organization created by Murray Bookchin and Howie Hawkins.

== History ==
In 1984, members of the Institute for Social Ecology, which Bookchin directed, participated in the "Founding Conference of a National Green Politics Organization", which was a precursor to the Green Party of the United States, in order to oppose the top-down creation of a national party. The anti-party attendees won, and the proto-Greens instead created many local Green Committees of Correspondence (GCoC). In 1987, Bookchin spoke at the National Green Gathering, where he denounced Earth First! and Dave Foreman as social reactionaries for opposing aid to starving people.

In 1988, Bookchin and Hawkins founded LGN as a radical alternative to liberalism in the US Green movement, based around the principles of social ecology and libertarian municipalism. About 50 people attended the founding conference. LGN worked within the GCoC to advance social ecologist views, to demand a stronger anti-capitalist stance, and to oppose realo politics. In their founding documents, LGN explicitly rejected the "left wing of the possible" framing coined by Michael Harrington of the Democratic Socialists of America.

In 1991, GCoC members who supported electoral politics created the Green Party Organizing Committee (GPOC). At the fourth GCoC conference, the LGN crashed GPOC meetings and won control of the organization. As a result, the GCoC was restructured into the Greens/Green Party USA (G/GPUSA), which focused more on direct membership and direct action than on electoral work.

The formation of the G/GPUSA split the Green movement. As a result, the GPOC dissolved and became the Green Politics Network, which would eventually create the election-focused Association of State Green Parties (ASGP) in 1996 after Ralph Nader's presidential campaign. From 1996 to 1999, the ASGP and G/GPUSA competed over Green candidates and dues-payers. In 2000 and 2001, ASGP leader Mike Feinstein and G/GPUSA leader Howie Hawkins attempted to merge their organizations. However, at the 2001 G/GPUSA convention, this proposal won majority support, but not the necessary 2/3 majority. The G/GPUSA analogized this split to the fundi–realo split in the German Greens, with G/GPUSA as fundis and GPUS as realos. In the long run, the ASGP was more successful: In 2001, the ASGP became the modern Green Party of the United States (GPUS), while the G/GPUSA would shrink until it dissolved in 2019.

In the 1990s, as enthusiasm for socialism faded, the LGN also faded away until it became defunct in 1993.

== Impact ==
Due to its power in the G/GPUSA, LGN played a large role in shaping the Green movement's political positions, especially its focus on ecological social justice rather than a narrow environmentalism. In 2020, former LGN member Howie Hawkins ran on the GPUS ticket for president of the US.

== See also ==
- Murray Bookchin
- Howie Hawkins
- History of the Green Party of the United States
- Association of State Green Parties
- Greens/Green Party USA
- Green Party of the United States
