= Ralph Nader presidential campaign =

Ralph Nader presidential campaign could refer to:

- Ralph Nader presidential campaign, 1992
- Ralph Nader presidential campaign, 1996
- Ralph Nader presidential campaign, 2000
- Ralph Nader presidential campaign, 2004
- Ralph Nader presidential campaign, 2008
