= Women's Work =

Women's Work may refer to:

- Women's work, work stereotypically considered to be exclusively the domain of women
- "Women's Work" (The Handmaid's Tale), a television episode
- Women's Work: The First 20,000 Years, a book by Elizabeth Wayland Barber
- Women's Work: Modern Women Poets Writing in English, a 2008 anthology co-edited by Eva Salzman
