= Ralph Nader 2000 presidential campaign =

American political campaign

Ralph Nader for President 2000
- Campaign: U.S. presidential election, 2000
- Candidate: Ralph Nader; Founder of Public Citizen and progressive activist Winona LaDuke; Political activist
- Affiliation: Green candidate
- Status: Lost election
- Headquarters: Washington, DC

Website
- www.votenader.org (archived – May 12, 2000)

Nader giving a campaign speech in Austin, Texas

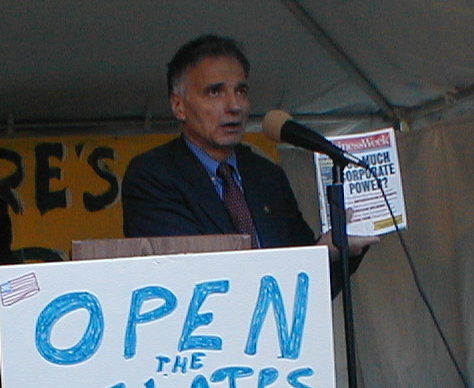
Nader speaks out against the presidential debates at Washington University in St. Louis from which he was excluded on October 17, 2000.

The 2000 presidential campaign of Ralph Nader, political activist, author, lecturer and attorney, began on February 21, 2000. He cited "a crisis of democracy" as motivation to run. He ran in the 2000 United States presidential election as the nominee of the Green Party. He was also nominated by the Vermont Progressive Party and the United Citizens Party of South Carolina. The campaign marked Nader's second presidential bid as the Green nominee, and his third overall, having run as a write-in campaign in 1992 and a passive campaign on the Green ballot line in 1996.

Nader's vice presidential running mate was Winona LaDuke, an environmental activist and member of the Ojibwe tribe of Minnesota.

Nader appeared on the ballot in 43 states and DC, up from 22 in 1996. He received 2,882,955 votes, or 2.74 percent of the popular vote. His campaign did not attain the 5 percent required to qualify the Green Party for federally distributed public funding in the next election. The percentage did, however, enable the Green Party to achieve ballot status in new states such as Delaware and Maryland.

Some analysts believe that had Nader and the Green Party not participated as a third-party in the 2000 U.S. presidential election, Al Gore would have won. Even Nader's post-election analysis seems to confirm this theory. However, when asked about this, Nader pointed to other factors and other ways Gore could have won, as did his ally, Jim Hightower.

== Nomination process ==
On July 9, the Vermont Progressive Party nominated Nader, giving him ballot access in the state. On August 12, the United Citizens Party of South Carolina chose Ralph Nader as its presidential nominee, giving him a ballot line in the state.

The Association of State Green Parties (ASGP) organized the national nominating convention that took place in Denver, Colorado, in June 2000, at which Greens nominated Ralph Nader and Winona LaDuke to be their parties' candidates for president and vice president, and Nader presented his acceptance speech.

== Ballot access ==
Nader's Ballot Access by State On state ballot Not on state ballot, eligible as write-in candidate only Not on State Ballot nor eligible as write-in candidate

Nader qualified to appear on the state ballot in 43 states along with the District of Columbia. In four states, Georgia, Indiana, Idaho, and Wyoming, Nader's name did not appear on the state ballot but he was eligible to receive official write-in votes that were counted. In 3 states, North Carolina, Oklahoma, and South Dakota, Nader neither appeared on the state ballot nor was he eligible to receive write-in votes.

== Campaign issues ==
Nader campaigned against the pervasiveness of corporate power and spoke on the need for campaign finance reform. His campaign also addressed problems with the two party system, voter fraud, environmental justice, universal healthcare, affordable housing, free education including college, workers' rights and increasing the minimum wage to a living wage. He also focused on the three-strikes rule, exoneration for prisoners for drug related non-violent crimes, legalization of commercial hemp and marijuana (also known as cannabis), and a shift in tax policies to place the burden more heavily on corporations than on the middle and lower classes. He opposed pollution credits and giveaways of publicly owned assets.

Nader and many of his supporters believed that the Democratic Party had drifted too far to the right. Throughout the campaign, Nader noted he had no worries about taking votes from Al Gore. He stated, "Isn't that what candidates try to do to one another—take votes?" Nader insisted that any failure to defeat Bush would be Gore's responsibility: "Al Gore thinks we're supposed to be helping him get elected. I've got news for Al Gore: If he can't beat the bumbling Texas governor with that terrible record, he ought to go back to Tennessee."

== Campaign developments ==
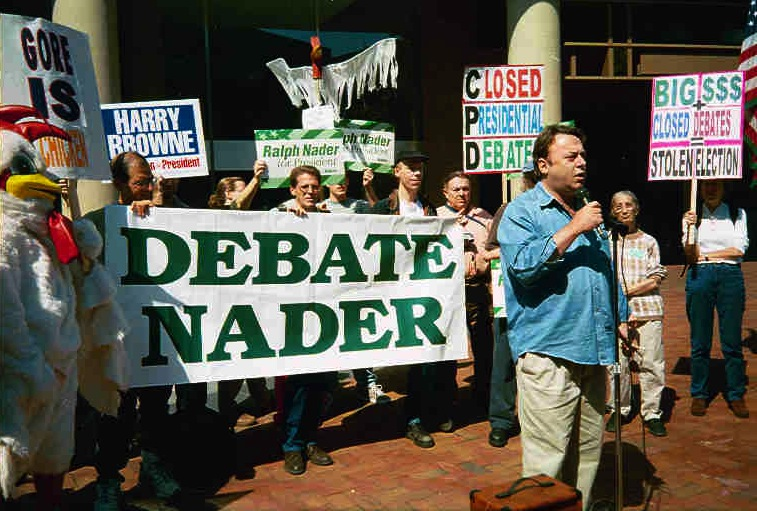
Nader's supporters protest his exclusion from the debates.

The campaign staged a series of large rallies that each drew over 10,000 paying attendees, such as 12,000 in Boston.

In October 2000, at the largest rally, in New York City's Madison Square Garden, 15,000 people paid $20 each to attend. Nader said that his two main opponents, Vice President Al Gore and Texas Governor George W. Bush, were "Tweedledee and Tweedledum - they look and act the same, so it doesn't matter which you get." He denounced Gore and Bush as "the bad and the worse," whose policies primarily reflect the influence of corporate campaign contributions. He further charged that corporate influence has blurred any meaningful distinctions between the Democratic and Republican Parties.

The campaign secured some union help. The California Nurses Association and the United Electrical Workers endorsed his candidacy and campaigned for him.

Nader did not appear on the ballot in some states. The Nader campaign launched an effort to challenge the inclusion criteria for the presidential debates sponsored by the Commission on Presidential Debates.

== Spoiler controversy ==
External videos
- Booknotes interview with Nader on Crashing the Party: How to Tell the Truth and Still Run for President, February 3, 2002, C-SPAN

In the 2000 presidential election in Florida, George W. Bush defeated Al Gore by 537 votes. Nader received 97,421 votes in Florida (and Pat Buchanan and Harry Browne received 17,484 and 16,415 respectively), which led to a general consensus that Nader's campaign took enough votes from Gore in Florida to cost him the election.

=== Prior to the election ===
As pre-election polls showed the race to be close, a group of activists who had formerly worked for Nader calling themselves "Nader's Raiders for Gore" urged their former mentor to end his campaign. They wrote an open letter to Nader dated October 21, 2000, which stated in part, "It is now clear that you might well give the White House to Bush. As a result, you would set back significantly the social progress to which you have devoted your entire, astonishing career." Mainstream media noticed the publishing of the petition.

When Nader, in a letter to environmentalists, attacked Gore for "his role as broker of environmental voters for corporate cash," and "the prototype for the bankable, Green corporate politician," and what he called a string of broken promises to the environmental movement, Sierra Club president Carl Pope sent an open letter to Nader, dated October 27, 2000, defending Al Gore's environmental record and calling Nader's strategy "irresponsible." He wrote:

You have also broken your word to your followers who signed the petitions that got you on the ballot in many states. You pledged you would not campaign as a spoiler and would avoid the swing states. Your recent campaign rhetoric and campaign schedule make it clear that you have broken this pledge... Please accept that I, and the overwhelming majority of the environmental movement in this country, genuinely believe that your strategy is flawed, dangerous and reckless.

Pope also protested Nader's suggestion that a "bumbling Texas governor would galvanize the environmental community as never before," and his statement that "The Sierra Club doubled its membership under James G. Watt." Wrote Pope in a letter to the New York Times dated November 1, 2000:

Our membership did rise, but Mr. Nader ignores the harmful consequences of the Reagan-Watt tenure. Logging in national forests doubled. Acid rain fell unchecked. Cities were choked with smog. Oil drilling, mining and grazing increased on public lands. A Bush administration promises more drilling and logging, and less oversight of polluters. It would be little solace if our membership grew while our health suffered and our natural resources were plundered.

On October 26, 2000, Eric Alterman wrote for The Nation: "Nader has been campaigning aggressively in Florida, Minnesota, Michigan, Oregon, Washington and Wisconsin. If Gore loses even a few of those states, then Hello, President Bush. And if Bush does win, then Goodbye to so much of what Nader and his followers profess to cherish."

In addition, the Republican Leadership Council ran pro-Nader ads in a few states in an effort to split the liberal vote.

=== After the election ===
Harry G. Levine, in his essay Ralph Nader as Mad Bomber states that Tarek Milleron, Ralph Nader's nephew and advisor, when asked why Nader would not agree to avoid swing states where his chances of getting votes were less, answered, "Because we want to punish the Democrats, we want to hurt them, wound them."

Moreover, syndicated columnist Marianne Means said of Nader's 2000 candidacy,

His candidacy was based on the self-serving argument that it would make no difference whether Gore or George W. Bush were elected. This was insane. Nobody, for instance, can imagine Gore picking as the nation's chief law enforcement officer a man of [John] Ashcroft's anti-civil rights, antitrust, anti-abortion and anti-gay record. Or picking Bush's first choice to head the Labor Department, Linda Chavez, who opposes the minimum wage and affirmative action.

Jonathan Chait of the American Prospect said this of Nader's 2000 campaign:

So it particularly damning that Nader fails to clear even this low threshold [Honesty]. His public appearances during the campaign, far from brutally honest, were larded with dissembling, prevarication and demagoguery, empty catchphrases and scripted one-liners. Perhaps you think this was an unavoidable response to the constraints of campaign sound-bite journalism. But when given more than 300 pages to explain his case in depth, Nader merely repeats his tired aphorisms.

In contrast, an analysis conducted by Harvard Professor B.C. Burden in 2005 showed Nader while did "play a pivotal role in determining who would become president following the 2000 election", but that:

Contrary to Democrats’ complaints, Nader was not intentionally trying to throw the election. A spoiler strategy would have caused him to focus disproportionately on the most competitive states and markets with the hopes of being a key player in the outcome. There is no evidence that his appearances responded to closeness. He did, apparently, pursue voter support, however, in a quest to receive 5% of the popular vote.

However, Chait notes that Nader did indeed focus on swing states disproportionately during the waning days of the campaign, and by doing so jeopardized his own chances of achieving the 5% of the vote he was aiming for.

There was the debate within the Nader campaign over where to travel in the waning days of the campaign. Some Nader advisers urged him to spend his time in uncontested states such as New York and California. These states – where liberals and leftists could entertain the thought of voting Nader without fear of aiding Bush – offered the richest harvest of potential votes. But... Nader – who emerges from this account as the house radical of his own campaign – insisted on spending the final days of the campaign on a whirlwind tour of battleground states such as Pennsylvania and Florida. In other words, he chose to go where the votes were scarcest, jeopardizing his own chances of winning 5 percent of the vote, which he needed to gain federal funds in 2004.

Dan Perkins agreed Nader was a spoiler and argued that other third-party candidates could have also been responsible for the defeat, including Workers World Party candidate Monica Moorehead, who received 1,500 votes.

An analysis and study by Neal Allen and Brian J. Brox titled "The Roots of Third Party Voting" agreed that Nader did determine the outcome of the election even if most of his votes would not have gone to Gore.

However, the study also targets Bill Clinton as "the individual who did the most harm to Gore (aside from himself)", a statement challenged by analysts and the press.

== Result ==
Nader's vote share by county Nader—>14% Nader—10–14% Nader—6–10% Nader—4–6% Nader—2–4% Nader—1–2% Nader—0–1% Not on state ballot Note: Nader not on ballot and only eligible as write-in candidate in Georgia, Indiana, Idaho, and Wyoming

=== Best states ===
In order for the Green Party to qualify for federal funds in the next election, Ralph Nader would have needed 5% of the total popular vote. Nader did receive 5% or more of the vote in the following states/districts:

- Alaska: 10.07%
- Vermont: 6.92%
- Massachusetts: 6.42%
- Rhode Island: 6.12%
- Montana: 5.95%
- Hawaii: 5.88%
- Maine: 5.70%
- Colorado: 5.25%
- District of Columbia: 5.24%
- Minnesota: 5.20%
- Oregon: 5.04%

=== Best counties ===
- San Miguel County, Colorado: 17.20%
- Missoula County, Montana: 15.03%
- Grand County, Utah: 14.94%
- Mendocino County, California: 14.68%
- Hampshire County, Massachusetts: 14.59%
- Franklin County, Massachusetts: 13.87%
- San Juan County, Colorado: 13.30%
- Pitkin County, Colorado: 12.99%
- Gunnison County, Colorado: 12.81%
- Humboldt County, California: 12.68%
- Boulder County, Colorado: 11.82%
- La Plata County, Colorado: 11.61%
- Windham County, Vermont: 11.52%
- Tompkins County, New York: 11.35%
- Gilpin County, Colorado: 11.20%
- Dukes County, Massachusetts: 11.10%
- San Juan County, Washington: 10.39%
- Travis County, Texas: 10.37%
- Saguache County, Colorado: 10.32%
- Cook County, Minnesota: 10.28%
- Summit County, Colorado: 10.22%
- Douglas County, Kansas: 10.12%
- Santa Cruz County, California: 10.01%

== Campaign staff ==
- Theresa Amato – Campaign manager
- Jim Davis – Campus coordinator for the campaign
- Howie Hawkins – Field Coordinator for Upstate New York

== Endorsements ==
=== Unions ===
- United Electrical Workers (August 30, 2000)
- California Nurses Association (June 14, 2000)
- Hemp Industries Association (September 14, 2000)
- AFSCME Local 1108 (August 2000), 1,200 members
- Dan McCarthy, President of UAW Local 417
- Al Benchich, President UAW Local 909

=== Political figures ===
- John Anderson (I-IL), Ex-GOP Congressman
- Peter Camejo (Green-CA), 1976 Socialist Workers Party Presidential Nominee
- Barry Commoner (I-NY), 1980 Citizens Party Presidential Nominee
- Barbara Ehrenreich (I-NY), 1988 Socialist Party Vice Presidential Nominee
- Mike Feinstein (Green-CA), Santa Monica Councilmember
- Doris "Granny D" Haddock (I-NH), Campaign Finance Reform Activist
- Dan Hamburg (Green-CA), Ex-Democratic Congressman
- Jim Hightower (D-TX), Ex-State Agriculture Commissioner
- Nicholas Johnson (D-IA), Ex-Federal Communications Commissioner
- Mel King (D-MA), Ex-State Rep.
- Kevin McKeown (Green-CA), Santa Monica City Councilmember
- Anthony Pollina (PP-VT), ran for Governor of Vermont on 2000
- Laurel Lunt Prussing, former member of the Illinois House of Representatives (1993–1995).
- Elizabeth Horton Sheff (Green-CT), Hartford City Councilmember
- Peter Steinbrueck (D-WA), Seattle City Councilman

=== Celebrities ===
- Susan Sarandon
- Michael Moore, documentarian
- Phil Donahue
- Eddie Vedder
- Tim Robbins
- Jackson Browne
- Bonnie Raitt
- Michelle Shocked
- Jello Biafra, Dead Kennedys singer and spoken word artist (had campaigned for Green Party nomination, later endorsed Nader)
- Patti Smith
- Bill Murray
- Ani Difranco
- Ben Harper
- Company Flow
- Danny Glover, actor
- Willie Nelson, singer
- Paul Newman
- Linda Ronstadt, singer
- Pete Seeger
- Indigo Girls folk duo Amy Ray and Emily Saliers
- Adam Yauch, member of hip hop trio the Beastie Boys
- Ad-Rock (Adam Horovitz), member of hip hop trio the Beastie Boys
- Ben Cohen, founder of Ben & Jerry's
- David Was, Member of the 1980s pop group, Was (Not Was)
- Hal Willner
- Studs Terkel, author

=== Newspapers ===
- San Francisco Bay Guardian
- L.A. Weekly (conditional) --October 27 – November 2
- Colorado Daily
- Colorado Springs Independent—October 26, 2000
- Aspen Times
- Winsted Journal (CT)
- Hartford Advocate (CT)
- Westchester County Weekly (CT)
- Lancaster Times (MA)
- Clinton Courier (MA)
- Worcester Magazine (MA)
- Detroit Metro Times—October 26, 2000
- Michigan Citizen
- Village Voice (NY) --November 1–7, 2000
- Metroland (NY)
- CITY (NY)
- Cleveland Free Times—November 1–7, 2000
- CityBeat (OH, KY)
- In Pittsburgh
- Amery Free Press (WI)
- The Austin Chronicle—November 3, 2000 (Split Gore-Nader)

=== Political parties (organizations) ===
- Green Party of the United States
- American Reform Party (June 25, 2000)
- Vermont Progressive Party
- United Citizens Party of South Carolina
- Rainbow Coalition Party of Massachusetts
- Progressive Dane

=== Political publications ===
- International Socialist Review published by Center for Economic Research and Social Change

=== Academics ===
- Howard Zinn, historian
- Noam Chomsky, linguist
- Cornel West
- Robert Fellmeth
- Petition of 296 leading academics endorsing Nader

=== Activists ===
- Randall Robinson, Co-Chair campaign's Citizens’ Committee for Nader/LaDuke
- Ron Kovic
- Norman Solomon
- David Brower
- Greg Kafoury, trial lawyer and political activist in Portland, Oregon
- Gerry Spence, trial lawyer and founder of Trial Lawyer’s College
- Yvon Chouinard, rock climber, environmentalist and outdoor industry businessman
- Merle Hansen, family farm activist, 1984 Democratic National Convention speaker
- Christopher Hitchens,
- Mark Ritchie, president of the Institute for Agriculture and Trade Policy and future Minnesota Secretary of State (2006)
- Blase Bonpane
- Jerry Mander
