= Rensenbrink =

Rensenbrink is a Dutch surname. Notable people with the surname include:

- John Rensenbrink (1928–2022), American political scientist, philosopher, journalist, educational innovator, and political activist
- Rob Rensenbrink (1947–2020), Dutch footballer
