= Electoral history of Howie Hawkins =

Elections featuring American politician

The electoral history of Howie Hawkins includes the 2020 Green Party presidential primaries and caucuses, campaigns for United States Senate and House of Representatives in New York, and the city of Syracuse, New York.

== Electoral history ==
=== City of Syracuse elections ===
==== 2005 ====
2005 Syracuse mayoral election
Party	Candidate	Votes	%	±%
Democratic	Matthew Driscoll (Incumbent)	16,470	49.7	N/A
Republican	Joanie Mahoney	15,110	45.6	N/A
Green	Howie Hawkins	1,551	4.7	N/A
Independence	Joanie Mahoney			N/A
Working Families	Matthew Driscoll (Incumbent)			N/A
Conservative	Joanie Mahoney			N/A
Majority		1,360	4.1	
Turnout		33,131		
Democratic hold				

==== 2009 ====
2009 Syracuse common councilor election (District 4)
Party	Candidate	Votes	%
Democratic	Thomas Seals	1,529	59.17%
Green	Howie Hawkins	1,055	40.83%
Majority		474	18.34%
Turnout		2,584	
Democratic hold			

==== 2011 ====
2011 Syracuse common councilor election (District 4)
Party	Candidate	Votes	%	±%
Democratic	Khalid Bey	1,214	52.08%	−7.10%
Green	Howie Hawkins	1,117	47.92%	+7.10%
Majority		97	4.16%	−14.18%
Turnout		2,331		
Democratic hold		Swing		

==== 2013 ====
2013 Syracuse common councilor election (District 4)
Party	Candidate	Votes	%	±%
Democratic	Khalid Bey (inc.)	1,471	59.65%	+7.57%
Green	Howie Hawkins	995	40.35%	−7.57%
Majority		476	19.3%	+15.14
Turnout		2,466		
Democratic hold		Swing		

==== 2015 ====
2015 Syracuse city auditor election
Party	Candidate	Votes	%
Democratic	Martin Masterpole	8,887	58.21%
Working Families	Martin Masterpole	948	6.21%
Reform Party of New York	Martin Masterpole	153	1.00%
Total	Martin Masterpole (incumbent)	9,988	65.42%
Green	Howie Hawkins	5,249	34.38%
Write-in		30	0.20%
Majority		4,739	31.04%
Total votes		1,526	100.00%
Democratic hold			

==== 2017 ====
2017 Syracuse mayoral election
Party	Candidate	Votes	%
Independence	Ben Walsh	12,351	48.81%
Reform Party of New York	Ben Walsh	1,233	4.87%
Total	Ben Walsh	13,584	53.68%
Democratic	Juanita Perez Williams	9,701	38.34%
Green	Howie Hawkins	1,017	4.02%
Republican	Laura Lavine	673	2.66%
Working Families	Joe Nicoletti	305	1.20%
Write-in		25	0.10%
Majority		3,883	15.34%
Total votes		25,305	100.00%
Independence gain from Democratic			

=== New York gubernatorial elections ===
==== 2010 ====
2010 New York gubernatorial election
Party	Candidate	Votes	%	±%
Democratic	Andrew Cuomo Robert Duffy	2,609,465	56.52%	–1.82
Working Families	Andrew Cuomo Robert Duffy	154,835	3.35%	+0.05
Independence	Andrew Cuomo Robert Duffy	146,576	3.17%	–0.89
Total	Andrew Cuomo; Robert Duffy	2,910,876	63.05%	–2.65
Republican	Carl Paladino Greg Edwards	1,289,817	27.94%	+4.40
Conservative	Carl Paladino Greg Edwards	232,215	5.03%	1.44+
Taxpayers Party of New York	Carl Paladino Greg Edwards	25,825	0.56%	New
Total	Carl Paladino Greg Edwards	1,547,857	33.53%	+6.41
Green	Howie Hawkins Gloria Mattera	59,906	1.30%	+0.41
Libertarian	Warren Redlich Alden Link	48,359	1.05%	+0.74
Rent Is Too Damn High	Jimmy McMillan James D. Schultz	41,129	0.89%	+0.61
Freedom Party of New York (2010)	Charles Barron Eva M. Doyle	24,571	0.53%	New
Anti-Prohibition Party	Kristin M. Davis Tanya Gendelman	20,421	0.44%	New
Scattering	Scattering	4,836	0.10%	N/A
Majority		1,363,019	29.52%	–9.06
Total votes		4,769,741	100.00%	
Democratic hold				

==== 2014 ====
New York gubernatorial election, 2014
Party	Candidate	Votes	%	±%
Democratic	Andrew Cuomo	1,811,672	47.52%	−9.00%
Working Families	Andrew Cuomo	126,244	3.31%	−0.04%
Independence	Andrew Cuomo	77,762	2.04%	−1.13%
Women's Equality	Andrew Cuomo	53,802	1.41%	N/A
Total	Andrew Cuomo/Kathy Hochul (incumbent)	2,069,480	54.28%	−8.77%
Republican	Rob Astorino	1,234,951	32.39%	+4.45%
Conservative	Rob Astorino	250,634	6.57%	+1.54%
Stop-Common-Core	Rob Astorino	51,492	1.35%	N/A
Total	Rob Astorino/Christopher Moss	1,537,077	40.31%	+6.78%
Green	Howie Hawkins/Brian Jones	184,419	4.84%	+3.54%
Libertarian	Michael McDermott/Chris Edes	16,769	0.44%	−0.61%
Sapient	Steven Cohn/Bobby Kalotee	4,963	0.13%	N/A
Total votes		'3,812,708'	'100.0%'	N/A
Democratic hold				

==== 2018 ====
New York gubernatorial election, 2018
Party	Candidate	Votes	%	±%
Democratic	Andrew Cuomo	3,424,416	56.16%	+8.64%
Working Families	Andrew Cuomo	114,478	1.88%	−1.43%
Independence	Andrew Cuomo	68,713	1.13%	−0.91%
Women's Equality	Andrew Cuomo	27,733	0.45%	−0.96%
Total	Andrew Cuomo (incumbent)	3,635,340	59.62%	+5.43%
Republican	Marc Molinaro	1,926,485	31.60%	−0.79%
Conservative	Marc Molinaro	253,624	4.16%	−2.41%
Reform	Marc Molinaro	27,493	0.45%	N/A
Total	Marc Molinaro	2,207,602	36.21%	−4.10%
Green	Howie Hawkins	103,946	1.70%	−3.14%
Libertarian	Larry Sharpe	95,033	1.56%	+1.12%
SAM	Stephanie Miner	55,441	0.91%	N/A
Total votes		'6,097,362'	'100.0%'	N/A
Democratic hold				

=== United States House of Representatives elections ===
==== 2000 ====
2000 New York's 25th congressional district election
Party	Candidate	Votes	%
Republican	James T. Walsh	132,120	59.99%
Independence	James T. Walsh	10,512	4.77%
Conservative	James T. Walsh	9,248	4.20%
Total	James T. Walsh (incumbent)	151,880	68.96%
Democratic	Francis Gavin	64,533	29.30%
Green	Howie Hawkins	3,830	1.74%
Majority		87,347	39.66%
Total votes		220,243	100.00%
Republican hold			

==== 2004 ====
2004 New York's 25th congressional district election
Party	Candidate	Votes	%
Republican	James T. Walsh	155,163	74.18%
Independence	James T. Walsh	20,184	9.65%
Conservative	James T. Walsh	13,716	6.56%
Total	James T. Walsh (incumbent)	189,063	90.39%
Peace and Justice	Howie Hawkins	20,106	9.61%
Majority		168,957	80.78%
Total votes		209,169	100.00%
Republican hold			

==== 2008 ====
2008 New York's 25th congressional district election
Party	Candidate	Votes	%
Democratic	Dan Maffei	148,290	51.65%
Working Families	Dan Maffei	9,085	3.16%
Total	Dan Maffei	157,375	54.82%
Republican	Dale Sweetland	106,653	37.15%
Conservative	Dale Sweetland	13,564	4.72%
Total	Dale Sweetland	120,217	41.87%
Green	Howie Hawkins	9,483	3.30%
Write-in		24	0.01%
Majority		37,158	12.95%
Total votes		287,099	100.00%
Democratic gain from Republican			

=== United States Senate elections ===
==== 2006 ====
2006 United States Senate election in New York
Party	Candidate	Votes	%
Democratic	Hillary Clinton	2,698,931	
Independence	Hillary Clinton	160,705	
Working Families	Hillary Clinton	148,792	
Total	Hillary Clinton (incumbent)	3,008,428	67.0%
Republican	John Spencer	1,212,902	
Conservative	John Spencer	179,287	
Total	John Spencer	1,392,189	31.0%
Green	Howie Hawkins	55,469	1.20%
Others	Others	33,967	0.8%
Majority		1,616,239	36.0%
Total votes		4,490,053	100.00%
Democratic hold			

=== United States presidential elections ===
==== 2016 ====
Howie Hawkins stood in for Ajamu Baraka as Jill Stein's vice-presidential running mate in Minnesota in 2016.

2016 United States presidential election in Minnesota
Presidential candidate Vice presidential candidate	Party	Popular votes	%	Electoral votes
Hillary Clinton; Tim Kaine	Democratic	1,367,716	46.44%	10
Donald Trump; Mike Pence	Republican	1,322,951	44.92%	0
Gary Johnson; William Weld	Libertarian	112,972	3.84%	0
Evan McMullin; Mindy Finn	Independent	53,076	1.80%	0
Jill Stein; Howie Hawkins	Green	36,985	1.26%	0
Others		51,113	1.74%	0
Total		2,944,813	100%	10

==== 2020 ====
2020 United States presidential election
Presidential candidate Vice presidential candidate	Party	Popular votes	%	Electoral votes
Joe Biden; Kamala Harris	Democratic	81,268,867	51.31%	306
Donald Trump (incumbent); Mike Pence	Republican	74,216,747	46.86%	232
Jo Jorgensen; Spike Cohen	Libertarian	1,865,620	1.18%	0
Howie Hawkins; Angela Walker	Green	405,704	0.26%	0
Others		626,299	0.40%	0
Total		158,381,554	100%	538
