= Greens/Green Party USA =

- Founder: Howie Hawkins
- Founded: 1991
- Dissolved: 2019
- Preceded by: Green Committees of Correspondence
- Succeeded by: Green Party of the United States
- Headquarters: Chicago, Illinois
- Newspaper: Synthesis/Regeneration
- Ideology: Green politics
- Political position: Left-wing
- Colors: Green

Website
- Archive

The Greens/Green Party USA (G/GPUSA) was a political organization formed out of the Green Committees of Correspondence in 1991 and was recognized as a national political party by the FEC from 1991 to 2005. It was based in Chicago. Synthesis/Regeneration, an affiliated journal of green social thought, was published in St. Louis. The now predominant Green Party of the United States split from the G/GPUSA in 2001.

== History ==
The Greens/Green Party USA (G/GPUSA) was founded at the August 1991 Green Gathering in Elkins, West Virginia, restructuring the Green Committees of Correspondence with the idea that the Green movement and Green Party would operate as part of a single organization.

A press conference was held in Washington, D.C., to announce the new organization, featuring Charles Betz (G/GPUSA Coordinating Committee member), Howie Hawkins and Joni Whitmore (Chair, Green Party of Alaska), as well as Hilda Mason of the D.C. Statehood Party, and was featured on C-SPAN. Subsequently, legal documents were filed under Missouri law to form the Greens/Green Party USA as a 527 group. It was recognized by the FEC as a national political party in 1991.

Subsequent G/GPUSA Green Gatherings were held in Minneapolis (Augsburg College, July 1992); Syracuse (August 1993); Boise (July 1994), Albuquerque (University of New Mexico, July 27–30, 1995), Los Angeles (UCLA, August 1996); and Lawrence, Massachusetts (August 1997).

At various times, a "Green Clearinghouse" was the central administrative office of G/GPUSA. The Clearinghouse has operated from various locations, including (originally) Kansas City, Missouri; Blodgett Mills, New York; Lawrence, Massachusetts; and Chicago.

Despite its development of a national-level organization, the G/GPUSA always emphasized that the "Green Local" is the primary organizing unit. Some members of G/GPUSA resisted efforts to organize Green parties at the state level, on the theory that state bureaucracy was inimical to the organic and democratic nature of autonomous Green locals. The model in the early days was based on the bioregion and not state boundaries. Other Greens pointed out that, in most jurisdictions in the United States, political parties gain recognition at the state level, so without state-level organizations it would be difficult for Greens to participate in election activities.

At the 2001 Congress of the G/GPUSA, held at Carbondale, Illinois, on July 21, the delegates were to consider the Boston Proposal, a separation of powers agreement between it and the Association of State Green Parties (ASGP). Many of those attending were also members of the ASGP. There was an intense organizational struggle, much of which revolved around whether or not to "accredit" various delegations (and thus grant them voting privileges). The proposal failed to reach the required two-thirds majority, although over half voted to approve it (99 in favor, 81 against).

The result was very controversial, and ultimately led to the exodus of many G/GPUSA activists, some of whom went on to form The Green Alliance, an organization intended to bring "movement" politics in the style of the G/GPUSA into the Green Party of the United States.

In 2001, the Green Party of the United States was founded and recognized by the FEC as a national committee, and has become a much larger and more visible than the G/GPUSA. In 2005, G/GPUSA lost its political party status at the FEC. It had reported no income or expenditures for some time.

The G/GPUSA Coordinating Committee notified its members and supporters of the decision to disband the party in January 2019.

== Magazine ==
The Greens/Green Party USA was an educational, grassroots organizing, advocacy group based on the 10 Key Values. The journal Synthesis/Regeneration, which operated from 1991 to 2013, was associated with the Party. Synthesis/Regeneration was formed from an editorial fusion of two earlier magazines, Green Synthesis and Regeneration. Synthesis/Regeneration was published every four months in St. Louis. Edited by Don Fitz, the journal published articles by writers with a wide range of Green viewpoints, examining contemporary issues in environmental politics, energy development, energy policy, climate change, social change, and social justice. 60 issues were published from 1991 to 2013, after which the journal was renamed Green Social Thought.

== Contrast with the Green Party of the United States ==
The Green Party of the United States and Greens/Green Party USA had no organizational connection but share a common and difficult history. The G/GPUSA is not an electoral party, although some of its members participate in elections. The name "G/GPUSA" is said to have reflected a compromise or a synergy between Greens who emphasized the primacy of combining non-electoral movement building with electoral campaigns, and those who sought to participate actively only in elections. It has also been characterized as a power grab when the original Committees of Correspondence split and a small group registered the name without consultation with the five existing state parties, all in the western states.

The source of the rift between the two national Green parties was a matter of contentious debate. Some point to differences of political philosophy or views on the proper structure of the party or attitudes toward elections, while others suggest it was more about personality conflicts, turf struggles, and poor communication leading to concerns about financial and political accountability, or perhaps the 1991 name grab or the inaccurate G/GPUSA FEC filing in 1995. The heated debates and the fighting that was waged for several years at the national level (and among Greens within a few states, such as New York, Missouri, California and New Jersey) seemed largely irrelevant to the vast majority of grassroots Greens, who preferred to devote their energies to local organizing.

In an article on the G/GPUSA's website, the organization characterized the split between itself and the Green Party of the United States (GPUS) as akin to the fundi–realo split in the German Greens, with itself being the fundi wing and GPUS the realos.

== See also ==
- Association of State Green Parties
- Green party (worldwide)
- History of the Green Party of the United States
- List of political parties in the United States
- Ralph Nader presidential campaign, 1996
- Ralph Nader presidential campaign, 2000
