= Lorna Salzman =

American environmental activist, writer, lecturer, and organizer (born 1935)

- Born: Lorna Jackson; 1935 (age 90–91); New York City, U.S.
- Education: Cornell University (BA)
- Occupations: Environmental activist; writer; lecturer; community organizer
- Political party: Green
- Spouse: Eric Salzman (m. 1955; died 2017)
- Children: 2, including Eva

Lorna Salzman (née Lorna Jackson, born 1935) is an American environmental activist, writer, lecturer, and community organizer. She was a candidate for the 2004 presidential nomination of the Green Party of the United States.

== Biography ==
Salzman was born in 1935 in New York City and raised in Manhattan and Queens. She completed a BA at Cornell University in 1956.

In the early 1960s, Salzman began community organizing with her husband Eric Salzman against gentrification in Brooklyn Heights as a founder of the North Brooklyn Heights Community Group, and in the late 1960s, as a founder of the group Citizens for Local Democracy. In 1970, she attended the first public meeting of Friends of the Earth U.S., became a volunteer in 1972, and in 1975 became employed as the first representative for the Mid-Atlantic region. During this time, she began to focus on issues related to nuclear power, and in 1975, participated in a campaign that successfully stopped the transportation of radioactive waste through New York City in 1976. She worked with FOE staffer Pamela Lippe on local campaigns opposing nuclear power in New Hampshire, Long Island and Montague, Massachusetts, corresponded with scientists in the nuclear physics field, and wrote to the Bulletin of the Atomic Scientists and The New York Times.

After Friends of the Earth, Salzman worked for the New York City Department of Environmental Protection as a natural resource specialist, and became involved in green politics in New York. In 1989, as a member of the 10 Key Values Green movement, Salzman wrote the essay "Is the Left Green Network really Green?", which critiques several positions of the LGN and is considered by professor Greta Gaard to have "crystallized the first step in a debate between Left Greens and 10KV Greens over who would be allowed to determine the defining characteristics of "Green."" Salzman was a founder of the New York Greens, a predecessor of the Green Party of New York, and unsuccessfully ran as a Green Party candidate for political office several times, including for the U.S. House of Representatives and the U.S. Senate. In 2004, she unsuccessfully ran for the Green Party presidential nomination.

She is a member of the New York Academy of Sciences.

== Honors and awards ==
In 2000 she received the international Earth Day Award from the Earth Society Foundation for her committed environmental work.

== Personal life ==
She was married to Eric Salzman until his death in 2017. Their two daughters are poet Eva Salzman and composer/songwriter Stephanie Salzman.
