= Crashing the Party =

2002 book by Ralph Nader

Crashing the Party: How to Tell the Truth and Still Run for President
- First edition (publ. St. Martin's Press)
- Author: Ralph Nader
- Language: English
- Genre: Memoir
- Publisher: St. Martin's Press
- Publication date: January 2002
- Publication place: United States
- Pages: 352
- ISBN: 978-1-4299-7852-1
- Website: crashingtheparty.org (archived October 12, 2002)

Crashing the Party is a 2002 book by Ralph Nader, detailing his experiences running in the 2000 U.S. presidential election.

== Summary ==
Much of the book focuses on critiquing the modern Democratic Party, with Nader arguing that the party has become too much beholden to donors and drifted from the tradition of Franklin Delano Roosevelt; at one point, he remarks that "the Democrats might as well be Republicans" for their similar positions on many economic issues. Nader also criticizes the national media, accusing them of corruption and noting that "I can't overemphasize the influence of The New York Times and Washington Post in setting the scene for the rest of the media". The book concludes with a list of ten "First Stage Goals for a Better America."

== Publication ==
The book was published by St. Martin's Press in January 2002. The subtitle "How to Tell the Truth and Still Run for President" was considered significant because, according to critic Jonathan Chait, an "aura" honesty and trustworthiness had been central to Nader's work, both as an attorney and as a political candidate. Publishers Weekly predicted that the book would find its most success in the areas where Nader had won the most votes in the election.
