= Association of State Green Parties =

American political organization from 1996 to 2001

The Association of State Green Parties was an organization of state Green Parties in the United States between 1996 and 2001. In 2001, it evolved into the Green Party of the United States.

== Founding ==
In the aftermath of the first Green presidential campaign in 1996, 62 Greens from 30 states gathered over the weekend of November 16–17, 1996 to found the Association of State Green Parties (ASGP). The meeting was held at the historic Glen-Ora Farm in Middleburg, Virginia, where Jack Kennedy had his weekend retreat in his administration's early days (rented to the president by the mother of ASGP meeting host and Nader supporter Elaine Broadhead.)

Green Parties from 13 states were the founding members, and approved an initial set of bylaws that set out the ASGP's purpose: (1) Assist in the development of State Green Parties and (2) Create a legally structured national Green Party. The founding meeting also established a national newsletter Green Pages, which carries forward today as the newspaper of the GPUS. The founding editor was Mike Feinstein.

Subsequent ASGP meetings occurred in Portland, OR (April 5–6, 1997), Topsham, ME (October 3–5, 1997), Santa Fe, NM (April 24–26, 1998), Moodus, CT (June 5–6, 1999), and Hiawassee, GA (December 8–10, 2000). Ralph Nader appeared in Moodus to talk about running for president the next year.

The concept of the ASGP came out of the 1991 national Greens Gathering in Elkins, West Virginia, where a committee was tasked with examining what an eventual Green Party might look like. The committee produced a report with contributions from six authors, among them Greg Gerritt from Maine. Gerritt's suggestion was for the creation of an Association of State Green Parties based on sovereign state parties, essentially as he argued, how all parties end up structured in the US. The reaction within the GPUSA was, according to Gerritt, to throw him out of the GPUSA. But that did not kill the concept. Instead it was shared by those involved in the establishment of the Green Politics Network in 1992, and what was founded in 1996 in Middleburg very closely reflected the proposal Gerritt originally submitted.

== ASGP and the Greens/Green Party USA ==
The ASGP was predominantly focused on establishing state Green Parties and running and electing Greens for public office, even while its member state parties and the individual Greens involved remained involved in issue activism. From 1997 to 1999, as more state Green Parties continued to form, a highly competitive environment between the ASGP and the Greens/Green Party USA (G/GPUSA) began to develop in terms of who would affiliate with which organization, and ultimately who would become the definitive national Green Party. To some extent this divide reflected philosophical differences within U.S. Greens that went back to the late 1980s and early 1990s, around how a Green political party should be organized - based upon state parties, or upon dues-paying local Green groups.

In December 1999, Santa Monica, California, Green City Councilmember Mike Feinstein and New York Green Howie Hawkins met in New Paltz, New York, during the state meeting of the Green Party of New York State and crafted the 'Plan for a Single National Green Party, which was more generally known as the Feinstein/Hawkins Proposal, meant to create a single national Green Party from among the ASGP and GPUSA by Earth Day, April 2000. The proposal found quick support within the ASGP, but not within the Greens/GPUSA in time for Earth Day.

== Boston Proposal ==
Instead it would be in October 2000 that the Feinstein/Hawkins proposal was revisited, negotiated further and renamed the 'Boston Proposal' or 'Boston Agreement' (so named because it was negotiated in Boston on October 1–2 in the days before the first 2000 presidential debate).

The negotiators for the Association of State Green Parties were Tony Affigne, David Cobb, Robert Franklin, Greg Gerritt, Anne Goeke, Stephen Herrick, and Tom Sevigny; and for the Greens/Green Party USA: Starlene Rankin, John Stith, Jeff Sutter, Steve Welzer, Rich Whitney, and Julia Willebrand.

The Boston Proposal was approved by the ASGP at its December 2000 meeting in Hiawasee, GA, but did not pass at the July 2001 G/GPUSA Congress in Carbondale, CO. This caused a schism in G/GPUSA membership from which it never recovered. The next week on July 29 in Santa Barbara, CA the ASGP voted to become the Green Party of the United States, held a press conference in Santa Monica on July 30 to announce it, and was subsequently recognized as having National Committee status by the Federal Election Commission.

Text of the Boston Proposal:

JOINT PROPOSAL OF NEGOTIATING COMMITTEES OF THE ASSOCIATION OF STATE GREEN PARTIES and THE GREENS/GREEN PARTY USA

The Negotiating Committees of the Association of State Green Parties and the Greens/Green Party USA, meeting on October 1–2, 2000, have agreed unanimously to recommend to their respective organizations the following proposal for the creation of a new national Green Party, to be called "Green Party of the United States," and a National Committee of the Green Party, which will apply to the Federal Election Commission for official recognition as a national political party.

1. The Greens/Green Party USA may continue as an independent organization but will cease functioning as a political party and will adopt a new name that will omit the word, "party." It will relinquish the domain name, "www.greenparty.org" to the new party.

2. The Green Party shall leave the question of state dues entirely to the state parties and shall neither encourage state parties to collect dues nor discourage state parties from collecting dues.

3. The new Green Party shall have a paid "sustaining members" category of membership and shall encourage members of all state parties to become sustaining members of the national organization.

4. State parties in the new Green Party shall have written democratic by-laws and at least one convention a year (whether it be a general membership assembly or a delegate assembly elected by locals and members-at-large).

5. State Green Parties shall make a good faith effort, where reasonable, to have delegates to the National Committee elected by clusters of local groups. The basis of representation to the National Committee shall be one person, one vote, and in the United States, Congressional Districts are a reasonable approximation of equal population areas. Local groups within a Congressional District or Districts shall come together for the purpose of electing delegates. (Statement of intent: The exact number of delegates and the size of the areas to be used for selecting these delegates is currently under study and will be determined by the ASGP.)

6. Representation to the National Committee shall be based on the principle of one delegate per specified number of Congressional Districts, provided that there is a requisite level of Green Party activity, electoral and/or non-electoral, being conducted in those Congressional Districts.

7. The Accreditation Criteria of the Green Party National Committee shall include the following in addition to the criteria currently used by the ASGP:
a. Evidence of commitment to, and good faith efforts to achieve, gender balance in party leadership and representation.
b. Evidence of good faith efforts to empower individuals and groups from oppressed communities, through, for example, leadership responsibilities, identity caucuses and alliances with community-based organizations, and endorsements of issues and policies.

8. The Green Party National Committee shall reserve seats for representatives of nationally organized caucuses for traditionally disempowered groups, provided that each caucus shall demonstrate a total membership of at least 100 people, from at least 15 member states, use democratic procedures and choose to send representatives to the National Committee.

9. The G/GPUSA Negotiating Committee recommends to the affiliates of G/GPUSA that a mail referendum of the Green Congress be initiated. The referendum shall ask the Congress to authorize the G/GPUSA National Committee to certify whether the ASGP, at its December 2000 meeting, amends its bylaws to reflect the terms of this joint proposal. The mail referendum will also authorize the G/GPUSA National Committee to (a) adopt a new name that will omit the word "party"; (b) relinquish the domain name "www.greenparty.org" to the new party; and (c) support the request of the ASGP for an advisory opinion on the national committee status of the new party, provided that it does in fact certify that the ASGP has amended its bylaws in accordance with this proposal.

== ASGP and Nader 2000 presidential campaign ==
In September 1998, the New Mexico Green Party proposed that an ASGP Presidential Exploratory Committee be established for the 2000 elections. The ASGP Coordinating Committee passed the proposal on October 30, and on December 20 the ASGP Steering Committee appointed a seven-person committee, chaired by then Texas Green David Cobb. On February 22, 1999, the Committee sent a letter and questionnaire to prospective presidential and vice presidential candidates, asking if they were interested in running on the Green Party ticket in 2000 and if so, how would they envision conducting the campaign: Wendell Berry, Jerry Brown, Lester Brown, Noam Chomsky, Ron Daniels, Ron Dellums, Lani Guinier, Dan Hamburg, Woody Harrelson, Paul Hawken, Jim Hightower, Molly Ivins, Winona LaDuke, Bill McKibben, Cynthia McKinney, Toni Morrison, Ralph Nader, Ron Ouellette (requested the questionnaire), John Robbins and Jan Schlichtmann. On May 10 the committee also sent the letter and questionnaire to: Harry Belafonte, Julian Bond, Joycelyn Elders, Kurt Schmoke, Studs Terkel, Myrlie Evers-Williams and Gen. George Lee Butler.

Brown, McKibben, Chomsky, Guinier, Hawken, Miller wrote back declining, but all graciously thanking the ASGP for its outreach, and offering sympathetic statements of support for the Green Party project.

Nader also replied: "If I seek the nomination - a decision that will not be made until next year- and receive that designation, I will pursue a dedicated and thorough campaign that meets the Federal Election Commission requirements. Such an active campaign will have the objective of strengthening our nation’s democracy by strengthening the Green Party movement at the local, state and national levels; by emphasizing the problems of, and remedies for, the excessive concentration of corporate power and wealth in our country, by highlighting the important tools of democracy needed for the American people as voters/citizens, workers, consumers, taxpayers, and small savers/investors. If there are Greens who support my seeking the nomination, I encourage them to expand the number of volunteers and increase the time spent working to build the Green Party this year in order to advance the Party’s “Key Values” and to increase the likelihood of ballot access in all fifty states."

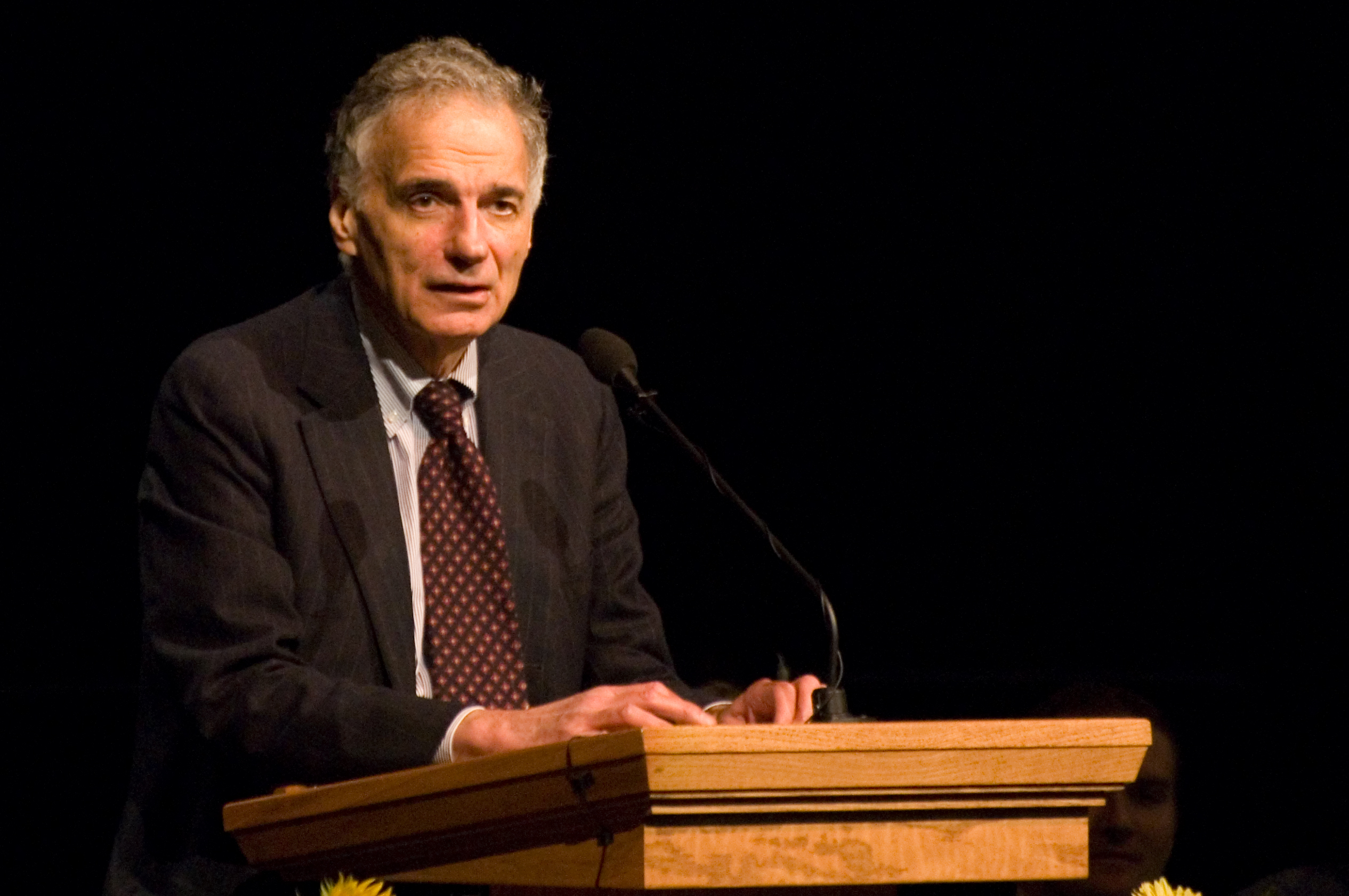
Ralph Nader, 1996 and 2000 nominee

At it June 23–25 convention in Denver, the ASGP nominated Ralph Nader and Winona LaDuke for president and vice-president. The pair appeared on 44 state ballots and received 2,883,105 votes, or 2.7 percent of all votes cast. Nader's strong showing in several states solidified the changes in the Green Party, transforming it from an "anti-party party" to an organization primarily dedicated to electoral campaigns. In particular, that was the widespread understanding of thousands of recruits to the party, as it went through an unprecedented rate of growth.

== International ==
In April 2001, the ASGP was represented at the founding congress of the Global Greens by Mike Feinstein, Annie Goeke and John Rensenbrink. The ASGP was also a founding member party of the Federacíon de Partidos Verdes de las Americas in 1998.
