= Howie Hawkins =

American activist and trade unionist (born 1952)

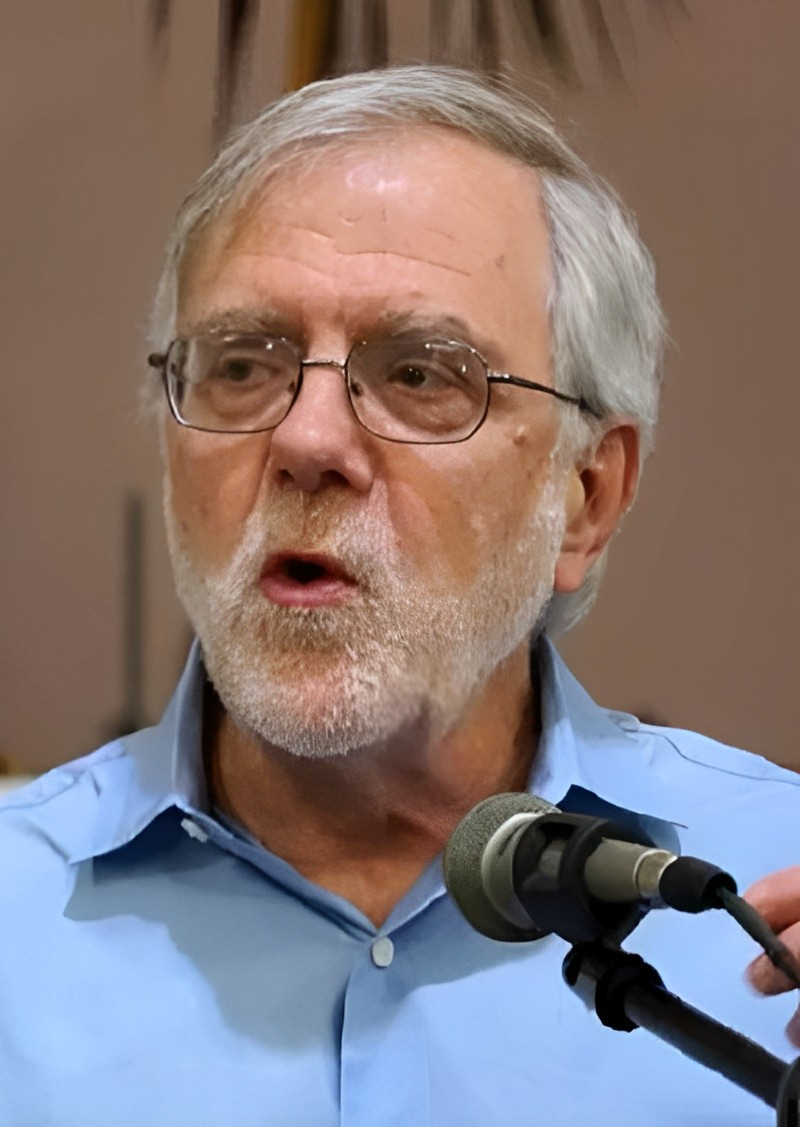
- Hawkins in 2018

Personal details
- Born: Howard Gresham Hawkins III; December 8, 1952 (age 73) San Francisco, California, U.S.
- Party: Green (2001–present); Socialist (1973–present)
- Other political affiliations: Greens/Green Party USA (1990s–2019) (Note: Prior to being a political party in the early 1990s, The Greens/Green Party USA was a Left–Green activist movement that started in the 1980s. The Greens merged into the Green Party in 2019.)
- Education: Dartmouth College

Military service
- Allegiance: United States
- Branch/service: United States Marine Corps
- Years of service: 1972–1978

Howard Gresham Hawkins III (born December 8, 1952) is an American trade unionist and environmental activist. Co-founder of the Green Party of the United States, Hawkins was the party's presidential nominee in the 2020 presidential election. His ideological platform includes enacting an eco-socialist version of the Green New Deal—which he first proposed in 2010—and building a viable, independent working-class political and social movement in opposition to the country's two major political parties and capitalism.

Hawkins has played leading roles in anti-war, anti-nuclear, and pro-worker movements since the 1960s. Hawkins is a retired teamster and construction worker; from 2001 until his retirement in 2017, Hawkins worked the night shift unloading trucks for UPS.

Hawkins has run for numerous political offices on 25 occasions, all of which resulted in losses. He was the Green Party of New York's candidate for the U.S. Senate in 2006. In 2010, Hawkins ran as the Green Party's candidate for Governor of New York, which restored ballot status for the party when it received more than the necessary 50,000 votes. In 2014, Hawkins ran again for the same office and received 5% percent of the vote. Hawkins ran for Mayor of Syracuse in 2017 and received roughly 4% of vote. He then ran a third time for Governor of New York in 2018, but received less than 2% percent of the vote.

Hawkins received 407,068 votes, or 0.2% of the electorate in the 2020 presidential election, receiving nearly a percentage less of the popular vote compared to 2016 Green Party nominee Jill Stein.

Hawkins ran for Governor of New York in 2022, but since the Green Party only received 32,832 votes in New York in the 2020 election, less than the 130,000 needed, the party lost ballot access and Hawkins ran as an Independent write-in candidate. He failed to win, attaining 9,290, or 0.2%.

== Early life and career ==
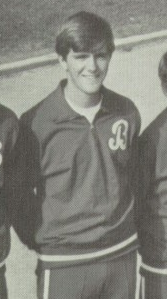
Hawkins in the 1970 Burlingame High School yearbook

Hawkins was born in San Francisco, California, in 1952, and raised in nearby San Mateo, California. He grew up in a diverse neighborhood in the city near the Bayshore Freeway, which had seen a large influx of migrants from the southern United States, both black and white: Hawkins has credited his southern-inflected accent as being a result of this. His father was an attorney who was a football and wrestling student-athlete at the University of Chicago and served in the counter-intelligence unit for the U.S. Army's Manhattan Project during World War II. He became politically active at the age of 12, when he saw how the multiracial Mississippi Freedom Democratic Party was denied recognition at the 1964 Democratic Convention.

After high school, Hawkins attended Dartmouth College in New Hampshire. He was never granted a degree because he did not complete the foreign language requirement. While at Dartmouth, he founded the Dartmouth Radical Union which opposed Dartmouth's investment in corporations that supported, among other causes, apartheid in South Africa and the Vietnam War. Despite his anti-war activism, he joined the Marine Corps after being drafted in 1972. He was never ordered back to active duty after completing boot camp.

That same year Hawkins campaigned for Bernie Sanders, then the Liberty Union Party candidate for senate and governor of Vermont. In 1973, Hawkins joined Socialist Party USA, a membership which has continued to the present day. In 1976, Hawkins was one of the co-founders of the Clamshell Alliance which was an anti-nuclear power organization aimed at stopping its use in New England.

=== Green Party ===
In the 1980s Hawkins joined the green movement. In 1988, he and Murray Bookchin founded the Left Green Network "as a radical alternative to U.S. Green liberals", based around the principles of social ecology and libertarian municipalism. In the early 1990s a press conference was held in Washington, D.C., that featured Charles Betz, Joni Whitmore, Hilda Mason, and Howie Hawkins to announce the formation of the Greens/Green Party USA. Later in December 1999, Mike Feinstein and Hawkins wrote the Plan for a Single National Green Party which was the plan to organize the ASGP and GPUSA into a single Green Party. A perennial candidate, Hawkins ran in multiple New York Senate and House races. In 2010 he surpassed the 50,000 vote requirement to stay on the ballot in the gubernatorial election and four years later he received enough to move the Green Party line to Row D as he had taken one-third more than the Working Families Party and twice as much as the Independence Party. However, in 2018 he lost 80,000 votes, but retained ballot access and was only lowered one row down to Row E.

In 2012 Hawkins was approached over the possibility of running for the Green Party nomination, but declined due to his employment commitments at UPS forcing him to campaign for offices in New York at most and would interfere with a national campaign. Following Hawkins' retirement he was approached again to run by a draft movement with a public letter addressed to him that was signed by former Green vice presidential nominees Cheri Honkala and Ajamu Baraka, former Green mayoral candidate and Ralph Nader's 2008 running mate Matt Gonzalez, and other prominent Green Party members.

Hawkins was accidentally listed on ballots in Minnesota as the Green Party candidate for vice president, along with Jill Stein for president in the 2016 general election. Although Ajamu Baraka was Stein's running mate on the party's national ticket, Hawkins was inadvertently placed on the Minnesota ballot due to the party using him as a stand-in before the vice-presidential candidate was chosen. With Hawkins listed, the Green Party ticket for President of the United States in Minnesota received nearly 37,000 votes statewide, an increase of 0.82% from the party's previous result in 2012.

=== Political positions ===
In 1993, Hawkins favored anarcho-communism as well as libertarian municipalism, as the "best way of integrating worker's control and community control in a process of social change that ultimately yields in a marketless, moneyless, stateless cooperative commonwealth". Hawkins was also a member of the Industrial Workers of the World.

Hawkins disagrees with the "party-within-the-party" approach to the Democratic Party exercised by organizations such as the Democratic Socialists of America or by individuals such as Bernie Sanders. Instead, he believes that socialists should immediately create an independent left-wing party. He has nevertheless expressed sympathy towards socialist politicians within the Democratic Party such as Zohran Mamdani, arguing that while their demands may be insufficiently anti-capitalist they should still be supported against more right-wing politicians, and that they represent a campaigning model that can be learned from.

Hawkins became the first politician to include the Green New Deal in their election platform when he ran for Governor of New York in 2010. Hawkins supports the Green Party's version of the Green New Deal that would serve as a transitional plan to a one hundred percent clean, renewable energy by 2030 utilizing a carbon tax, jobs guarantee, free college, single-payer healthcare and a focus on using public programs. He self-describes as an eco-socialist and libertarian socialist.

== New York politics ==
Hawkins was the Green Party of New York's candidate for the United States Senate in the state of New York. Hawkins received 55,469 votes in the November 2006 election (during which Hillary Clinton was re-elected), for 1.2% of the total votes cast.

In 2008, Hawkins ran for the United States House of Representatives in New York's 25th congressional district on the Green Populist line. Hawkins won 9,483 votes, losing to Democrat Dan Maffei by 147,892 votes.

In May 2010, Hawkins was nominated to run for Governor of New York as the Green Party candidate. His campaign was also supported by the Socialist Party of New York.

On November 2, 2010, Hawkins received nearly 60,000 votes (1.3%), allowing the Green Party of New York to be listed on the ballot for the next four years.

In December 2010, Hawkins was named co-chair of the newly recognized Green Party of New York.

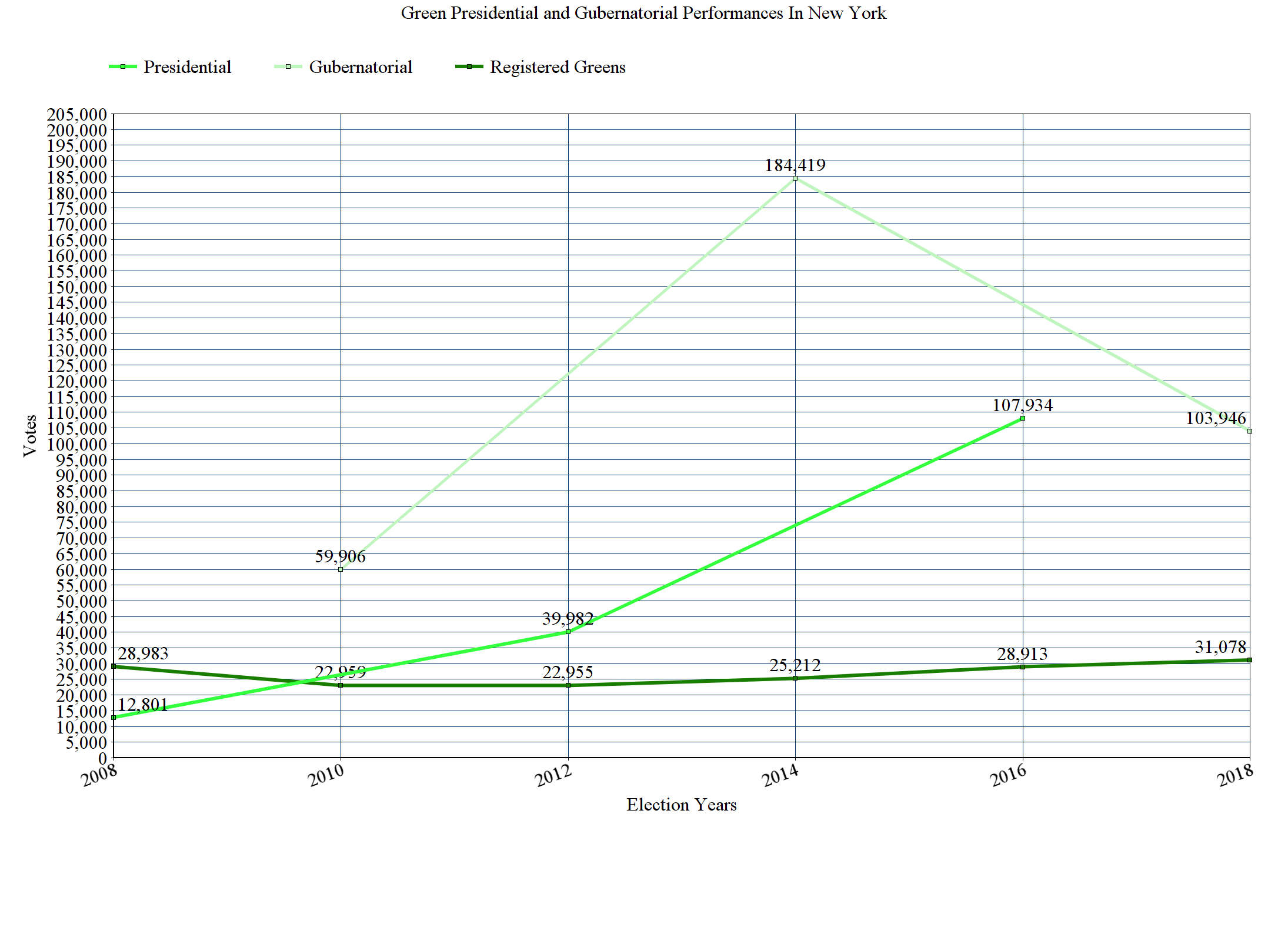
Hawkins' Gubernatorial Performance

Hawkins announced his candidacy for 4th District Common Councilor in Syracuse in September 2011, running as a Green Party candidate. His opponent was a Democrat, Khalid Bey. Hawkins received endorsements from the Syracuse Post Standard, UNITE HERE Local 150, and the Greater Syracuse Labor Council. Hawkins planned to sponsor resolutions for state tax code reforms to require more from the state's wealthiest, and to share more revenues with cities. He also supported the establishment of a municipal development bank to provide financing for local cooperative businesses and a 0.4% "commuter tax" on the incomes of suburbanites working in the city. Hawkins lost the election to Bey.

On May 20, 2013, Hawkins announced that he would again run for 4th District Common Councilor in Syracuse. His opponent was incumbent Democrat Khalid Bey. On October 16, 2013, Hawkins published a fiscal position paper with mayoral candidate Kevin Bott focused on a new scaled local income tax, and the role of the state in the fiscal crisis in Syracuse. Bott and Hawkins point out that New York revenue sharing with its biggest cities has decreased from the teens to just about one percent since the 1970s. Hawkins lost the election to Democrat Bey by a vote of 1,471 to 995.

On April 9, 2014, Hawkins announced his second candidacy for Governor of New York at the LCA Pressroom in Albany, New York. His campaign positions included a "Green New Deal" platform, a "Clean Money" system for public financing of elections, ending New York's role in the national Common Core standards, and a minimum wage increase to $15 an hour from the then-current $8 an hour in New York. Hawkins' running mate for Lt. Governor was New York City educator and union activist Brian Jones. Hawkins and the Green Party received 184,419 votes (4.8% of the vote), which moved the Green Party up to the fourth line on state ballots for the next four years (surpassing the Working Families and Independence parties).

In 2015, Hawkins ran for Syracuse City Auditor against incumbent Marty Masterpole. Hawkins noted that Masterpole had filed only two financial audits, and criticized him for auditing city skating rinks and golf courses while the city suffered from high poverty, failing infrastructure and struggling schools. Former District 2 city councilor Pat Hogan suggested to Hawkins that he should run for auditor, stating, "I'm not turning Green ... I am more concerned about the city than the party. The auditor is supposed to be a watchdog on the city budgets and Marty isn't doing any watching. There's a dearth of independence in city government." Hawkins lost the election, winning 35 percent of the vote.

In 2017, Hawkins ran for Mayor of Syracuse as a Green Party candidate to replace outgoing mayor Stephanie Miner. One of his central campaign points was to restore the Erie Canal through Downtown Syracuse to help aide in the revitalization of the neighborhood, with the belief that 'Cities that capitalize on their waterways tend to have more vibrant downtowns'. Hawkins won 4.1% of the vote (excluding write-ins) and lost to independent Ben Walsh (54.4%, excluding write-ins), the first independent in the city's history.

On April 12, 2018, Hawkins announced his third run for Governor of New York on the Green Party line. Hawkins and running mate Jia Lee received 95,716 votes (1.7%).

== 2020 presidential campaign ==
=== Background ===
In 2012 Hawkins was approached about the possibility of running for the Green Party presidential nomination, but declined due to his employment commitments at UPS, which would interfere with a national campaign.

However, following Hawkins' retirement he was approached again to run by a draft movement with a public letter addressed to him that was signed by former Green vice presidential nominees Cheri Honkala and Ajamu Baraka, former Green mayoral candidate and Nader's 2008 running mate Matt Gonzalez, and other prominent Green Party members.

=== Campaign ===
On April 3, 2019, Hawkins announced that he was forming an exploratory committee to prepare for a potential candidacy for the Green Party 2020 presidential nomination and later Hawkins formally launched his campaign on May 28, 2019, in Brooklyn, New York.

On August 23, 2019, the Hawkins campaign announced they had met the requisite federal matching funds for California and New York. The campaign must receive $5,000 from residents, with no more than $250 counted for each contribution, in at least 20 states to qualify for the funds. Only his campaign and Steve Bullock's applied for primary season matching funds.

On October 26, 2019, Hawkins won the nomination of the Socialist Party USA in his effort to unite smaller left-wing parties together. In November, Hawkins won the nomination of Solidarity.

On May 5, 2020, Hawkins selected Angela Walker as his running mate.

On July 11, 2020, Hawkins was chosen as the Green Party's nominee for the 2020 U.S. presidential election. His platform includes the Green New Deal (funded in part by cuts to military spending), Medicare for All, a federal jobs guarantee, a $20 minimum wage and a guaranteed minimum income.

On November 3, 2020, the results of the election were declared. Hawkins had received 407,068 votes (0.26%) of the popular vote, and 0 electoral votes. This was the third best showing a green party member had received, after Jill Stein and Ralph Nader. Hawkins conceded the election to Joe Biden.

== Publications ==
- Hawkins, Howard (2006). Independent Politics: The Green Party Strategy Debate. Haymarket Books. ISBN 978-1-931859-30-1.
- Howie, Hawkins (2020). The Case For An Independent Left Party: From The Bottom Up.
- Howie Hawkins New Politics (magazine)

== Notes ==
Party political offices
Preceded by Jill Stein	Green nominee for President of the United States; 2020	Succeeded by Jill Stein
Preceded by Mimi Soltysik	Socialist nominee for President of the United States; Endorsed; 2020	Succeeded by Bill Stodden
