= Eva Salzman =

American poet

Eva Salzman (born 1960) is a contemporary American poet.

Eva Salzman was born in 1960 in New York City to musicologist/composer Eric Salzman and activist/writer Lorna Salzman. She grew up in Brooklyn, where, from the age of 10 until 22, she was a dancer and later a choreographer. She was educated at Bennington College and Columbia University, then moved to Great Britain in 1985.

Salzman's eclectic background has led to work in cross-arts projects with artists, dancers, and singers. Her teaching for children, teenagers and adults has included projects in London’s East End and a residency at Springhill Prison, as well as continuing work for the Poetry Society’s Poet in the City and Poetryclass projects and co-devising a Start Writing Poetry course for the Open University. She is co-editor, with Amy Wack, of the 2008 anthology Women's Work: Modern Women Poets Writing in English.

Salzman's first collection of poetry, The English Earthquake, was a Poetry Book Society Recommendation and her second volume, Bargain With The Watchman, won a Special Commendation. Her poem "To the Enemy" was set for soprano and percussion ensemble by Australian composer Katia Tiutiunnik; the composition received its world premiere performance on August 26, 2010 at the opening "Visionaries" concert of the Soundstream Festival, Adelaide, South Australia. The premiere was broadcast live by ABC Classic FM.

She lives in Harringay, London. As of 2020, Salzman teaches literature at Emerson College in Boston, Massachusetts.

== Bibliography ==
- The English Earthquake
- Bargain With The Watchman
- Double Crossing: New and Selected Poems
- Women's Work: Modern Women Poets Writing in English (co-editor)
