= Ralph Nader 1996 presidential campaign =

Political campaign for president of the United States

Ralph Nader for President 1996
- Campaign: U.S. presidential election, 1996
- Candidate: Ralph Nader; Founder of Public Citizen and progressive activist Winona LaDuke; Activist
- Affiliation: Green candidate
- Status: Lost election: November 5, 1996
- Headquarters: Washington, DC

Website
- http://www.vais.net/~nader96/index.html

The 1996 presidential campaign of Ralph Nader, consumer advocate and political activist, began after he was drafted as a candidate for President of the United States on the Green Party ticket during the 1996 presidential election. Nader was not formally nominated by the national party or the Green Party USA organization, which was, at the time, the largest national Green group; instead he was nominated independently by various state Green parties. In some states, he appeared on the ballot as an independent.

== Background ==
Although Nader was not formally nominated by the national Green Party, a significant number of the party's members and supporters backed his presidential bid. Several of them actively campaigned for him. Nader qualified for ballot status in 22 states, garnering 685,297 votes or 0.71% of the popular vote (fourth place overall), although the effort did make significant organizational gains for the party. He refused to raise or spend more than $5,000 on his campaign, presumably to avoid meeting the threshold for Federal Election Commission reporting requirements; the unofficial Draft Nader committee could (and did) spend more than that, but the committee was legally prevented from coordinating in any way with Nader himself.

== Criticism ==
Nader received some criticism from gay rights supporters for calling gay rights "gonadal politics" and stating that he was not interested in dealing with such matters.

== Running mates ==
Instead of Nader having one running mate on all ballots on which he appeared, the women's caucus of the Green Party decided that a slate of women would run who would act as a cabinet of advisers for his campaign. Nader's multiple running mates included: Anne Goeke (14 states), Deborah Howes (Oregon), Muriel Tillinghast (New York), Krista Paradise (Colorado), Madelyn Hoffman (New Jersey), Bill Boteler (Washington, D.C.), and Winona LaDuke (California and Texas). However most political election websites dispute this and have LaDuke as his running mate in most of the states he ran in.

== Ballot access ==
Nader attained ballot status in 22 states.

== Events ==
A long term Green catch-phrase came out of the 1996 nominating convention. During Nader's acceptance speech, the crowd started to chant "Go Ralph Go!" to which Nader, appearing uncomfortable, gestured for silence and said "the intonation should be 'Go we Go'." The crowd obliged and the phrase "gowego" became a part of Green history.

== See also ==
Ralph Nader 2000 presidential campaign
