= John Rensenbrink =

American political scientist (1928–2022)

- Born: August 30, 1928; Pease, Minnesota, U.S.
- Died: July 30, 2022 (aged 93)
- Education: Calvin College (BA); University of Michigan (MA); University of Chicago (PhD)
- Occupations: Political scientist; conservationist; co-founder of the Green Party
- Spouse: Carla Washburne Resenbrink
- Children: Kathryn; Margaret; Elizabeth

John C. Rensenbrink (August 30, 1928 – July 30, 2022) was an American political scientist, philosopher, journalist, conservationist, and political activist. He initiated many organizations, the most prominent of which are the Maine Green Party (1984); the Green Party of the United States (1984–87) for both of which he was a principal founder; and the Cathance River Education Alliance (2000), a hands-on ecological education project for local schools, schoolchildren and high school students in mid-coast Maine.

== Early life and education ==
Rensenbrink was born in 1928 in rural Pease, Minnesota, one of seven children of Dutch-American farming parents. His mother, Effie (Aafje Kooiman), was born in the Netherlands; his father, John Rensenbrink, was the eldest son of Dutch immigrants.

Rensenbrink and his brother Henry operated the dairy farm upon their father's death in 1943. Unable to attend high school, Rensenbrink took a correspondence course conducted by the American School in Chicago. He left the farm in 1946 to attend Calvin College, an evangelical college in Grand Rapids, Michigan; his mother and siblings moved to that city the following year. Rensenbrink studied history, English and philosophy at Calvin and was editor of the college newspaper during his junior and senior years. He graduated with a BA in 1950. He then enrolled at the University of Michigan wher he focused primarily on political philosophy, and received a master's degree in political science in 1951. This was followed by a Fulbright Scholarship to study at the University of Amsterdam from 1951 to 1952. Thereafter, he studied at the University of Chicago, concentrating on political philosophy, American politics, and constitutional law, and completed his Ph.D. in political science from that university in 1956. His Ph.D. thesis was entitled "Technology and Utopia: the Structure of Freedom".

== Academic and other professional work ==
Rensenbrink began teaching at Coe College in Cedar Rapids, Iowa in 1956. After a year at Coe teaching history and international relations, he taught political philosophy and American government at Williams College in Williamstown, Massachusetts, for four years (1957–61).

He and his wife moved to Maine in 1961. Rensenbrink taught political philosophy and history at Bowdoin College in Brunswick, Maine, for one year before taking a job in 1962 for three years as education advisor to the governments of Kenya and Tanzania, sponsored by the U.S. Agency for International Development. He and Carla and their daughters Kathryn and Margaret, (born in Dar es Salaam), aged three and one respectively, returned to Bowdoin College in 1965. Rensenbrink was promoted to the tenured position of associate professor in 1968 and to full professor in 1974. The Rensenbrinks' third child, Elizabeth, was born in January 1968.

Rensenbrink spent the first six months of 1983 in Poland, accompanied by his wife and three daughters, as a research professor at the Marie Sklodowska University in Lublin, sponsored jointly by that university and Lock Haven State University in Pennsylvania.

Following semi-retirement in 1989, Rensenbrink continued teaching at Bowdoin for several years. Starting in the 1990s, Rensenbrink participated in the International Society for Universal Dialogue (ISUD), founded by Janusz Kuczynski, head of the philosophy department at the University of Warsaw. Serving as president for two years, he organized the 7th Congress of ISUD at Hiroshima in Japan in 2007. His presidential address was on cross-cultural dialogue as a major factor in the search for peace. Rensenbrink delivered one of three keynote addresses to the 11th Congress of ISUD in Warsaw on July 11, 2016. It was titled, "Co-Evolution—Basis for Inter-Active Dialogue."

== Political work ==
Rensenbrink left the Republican Party and became a Democrat after listening to the speeches of Adlai Stevenson, the Democratic nominee for president in 1952 and 1956. In 1968, following the assassinations of Martin Luther King Jr. and Robert F. Kennedy, and following Chicago Democratic Mayor Daley's police crackdown of student protestors at the national Democratic nominating convention in Chicago, Rensenbrink formed with others the Reform Democrats of Maine (1968 to 1970). In 1976 and 1978, Rensenbrink ran in the Democratic primary for the Lewiston/Auburn/Topsham Senate seat of the Maine legislature. He came up short both times, losing by 170 votes in 1978.

=== The Green Party ===
1984 was a decisive year for Rensenbrink. While in Poland the previous year, he had heard about the German elections where the German Green Party participated. They had won 27 seats in the German Parliament. That summer, on his way back to the United States, Rensenbrink stopped off in Munich and in Frankfurt to visit friends who had joined the German Green Party and were celebrating their unexpected parliamentary success. That fall, back in Maine and Bowdoin College, Alan Philbrook, a fellow anti-nuclear activist, called to say he had been at the first meeting of the Greens in Canada and, on his return to Maine, registered the Green Party of Maine. The two then called a meeting for January 14, 1984, to consider forming a Green Party organization in Maine. This was accomplished in Augusta on that date—the first of its kind, as they later discovered, in the United States.

Rensenbrink quickly made plans to seek early retirement (which was accomplished in 1989) and threw himself into Green Party organizing in Maine and in the United States. A meeting in St. Paul, Minnesota was followed by regular monthly meetings of what was first called the Committees of Correspondence, later changed to Green Committees of Correspondence, with a Clearing House in Kansas City headed by Dee Berry. Working with the Clearing House, the annual gathering of a Green Assembly, and the Inter-Regional Committee that had formed, Rensenbrink headed a three-year project to produce a Green Policy Program, generated from the over 300 grass roots groups that had sprung up in the early years. The Program was completed and approved in September 1990, at the annual meeting of the Green Assembly in Boulder, Colorado. Thereafter, Rensenbrink, with others, formed the Green Politics Network whose aim was the eventual creation of a national Green Party of associated state Green Parties. The result was the Association of State Green Parties (ASGP), which, from 1996 to 2001 grew to include all of the state Green parties and then morphed into the Green Party of the United States in 2001. Rensenbrink has continued to be active in the USGP's National Committee and annual Conventions and Presidential campaigns and in its International Committee, which he had founded in 1997 as part of ASGP.

Rensenbrink was the Maine Green Party's candidate for U.S. Senator in 1996 against Republican Susan Collins and Democrat Joe Brennan. and received 4% of the vote. The Maine Green Party changed its name to Maine Green Independent Party (MGIP) in 1998. It fielded a candidate for governor in each four-year election cycle from 1994 to 2006, getting 10% of the vote in 2002 and 2006.

== Community work ==
Rensenbrink helped found Merrymeeting Community Action (MCA) in mid-coast Maine in 1966–1967.

In 1999, Rensenbrink, together with his wife Carla and several fellow townspeople, created Topsham's Future, a citizen action group dedicated to balancing the then very rapid economic development of Topsham with the preservation and vitality of community values and neighborhood integrity. One of its major accomplishments was creation of the Cathance River Nature Preserve through extended negotiations with retirement-community developer John Wasileski. Building on their success in the negotiation, Rensenbrink and Wasileski joined together to found the Cathance River Education Alliance a program in 2000. The program provides hands-on ecological education for thousands of students and teachers in area schools. In 2019, the road leading to the CERA office was renamed "Rensenbrink Way."

Rensenbrink, as part of his goal to help develop an international community of strong ecological and politically alert activists from among Greens and Green-minded people, established the Green Horizon Foundation in 2002, and continued as its president.

== Death ==
Rensenbrink died on July 30, 2022.

== Selected awards ==
- Praxis Award for Distinguished Achievement in the Role of Scholar and Activist, presented September 2, 1994, by the American Political Science Association's Organized Section on Transformational Politics

== Publications ==
- How Change Does and Does Not Take Place: Maine Case Studies of Innovation in Education Reform Programs, ERIC Document, Resources in Education, Arlington, VA; Document Number ED 127664, 1977
- The Theory and Practice of Undistorted Communication, Analysis of the State Town Meeting Project 1990, Maine Humanities Council, Portland, Maine.
- Poland Challenges a Divided World, Louisiana State University Press, 1988
- The Greens and the Politics of Transformation, Preface by Jay Walljasper R&E Miles Publishers, 1992
- Against All Odds, the Green Transformation of American Politics, foreword by Ralph Nader, Leopold Press 1999

=== Selected articles ===
- "A Study in Praxis: the Caucus for a New Political Science." New Political Science, Winter 1980
- "Security, Democracy, and World Governance." In The Global Greens, Edited by Margaret Blakers. The Green Institute, Canberra 2001
- "Dialogue and Being – An Ontological Investigation." In Dialogue and Universalism, Vol XXIII, No. 3/2013.
