= 2026 California Secretary of State election =

- November 3, 2026
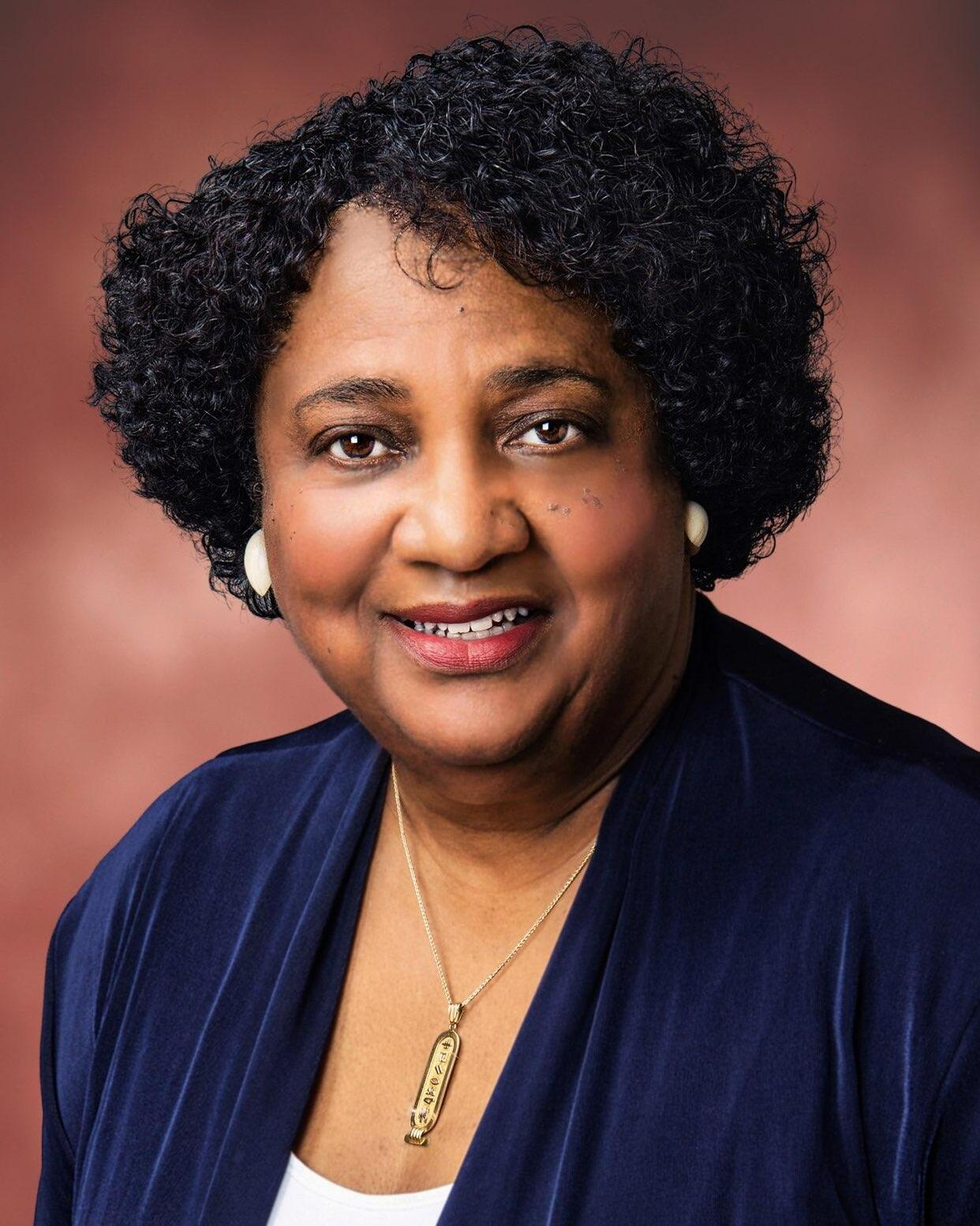

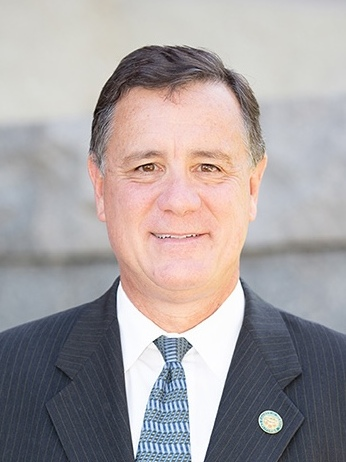
| Nominee | Shirley Weber | Don Wagner |
| Party | Democratic | Republican |
| Popular vote | 8,703,233 | 4,368,510 |
| Percentage | 66.6% | 33.4% |
- Weber: 50–60% 60–70% 70–80% 80–90% Wagner: 50–60% 60–70% 70–80%
Secretary of State before election
Shirley Weber
Democratic
Elected Secretary of State
Shirley Weber
Democratic

The 2026 California Secretary of State election took place on November 3, 2026, to elect the next secretary of state of California. The nonpartisan top-two primary election took place on June 2, 2026. Secretary of State Shirley Weber was elected in 2022 with 60.1% of the vote. She won re-election to a second term. Republican Orange County supervisor Don Wagner also ran for this position.

== Candidates ==
=== Democratic Party ===
==== Advanced to general ====
- Shirley Weber, incumbent California Secretary of State

=== Republican Party ===
==== Advanced to general ====
- Don Wagner, Orange County supervisor from the 3rd district (2019–present) and former state assemblymember from the 68th district (2010–2016)

=== Green Party ===
==== Eliminated in primary ====
- Gary Blenner, teacher
- Michael Feinstein, former Santa Monica city councilor (1996–2004) and candidate for secretary of state in 2018

== Primary election ==
=== Endorsements ===
Gary Blenner (G)

Political parties

- Green Party of California
- Peace and Freedom Party
Don Wagner (R)

U.S. senators

- Pete Wilson, former governor of California (1991–1999) and former U.S. senator from California (1983–1991) (candidate's honorary campaign chair)

Statewide officials

- Bill Jones, former secretary of state of California (1995–2003) (candidate's campaign co-chair)
- Bruce McPherson, former secretary of state of California (2005–2007) (Independent; candidate's campaign co-chair)

Political parties

- California Republican Party
Shirley Weber (D)

U.S. representatives

- Barbara Lee, mayor of Oakland (2025–present) and former U.S. representative from CA-12 (1998–2025)

Statewide officials

- Rob Bonta, attorney general of California (2021–present)

State legislators

- Toni Atkins, former president pro tempore of the California State Senate (2018–2024) from the 39th district (2016–2024)

Labor unions

- California Faculty Association
- California Federation of Labor Unions
- SEIU California
- SEIU United Healthcare Workers West
- International Brotherhood of Teamsters California

Organizations

- National Women's Political Caucus
- Sierra Club Angeles Chapter
- Stonewall Democratic Club

Political parties

- California Democratic Party

Party chapters

- Santa Monica Democratic Party

Newspapers

- Bay Area Reporter
- McClatchy Media California (Note: The Sacramento Bee, The Modesto Bee, The Fresno Bee, Merced Sun-Star, and The Tribune)
- San Francisco Bay Guardian
- San Francisco Chronicle
- San Francisco Examiner
- Sun-Reporter

=== Results ===
Results by county Weber: 40–50%; 50–60%; 60–70%; 70–80%; 80–90%; Wagner: 40–50%; 50–60%; 60–70%; 70–80%

Blanket primary results
| Party | Candidate | Votes | % |
|---|---|---|---|
| Democratic | Shirley Weber (incumbent) | 5,092,491 | 58.70 |
| Republican | Donald P. Wagner | 3,187,180 | 36.74 |
| Green | Michael Feinstein | 207,602 | 2.39 |
| Green | Gary Blenner | 187,925 | 2.17 |
| Total votes | | 8,675,198 | 100.00 |

==== By county ====
| County | Shirley Weber Democratic | | Donald P. Wagner Republican | | Various candidates Green | | Margin | | Total |
| County | # | % | # | % | # | % | # | % | Total |
|---|---|---|---|---|---|---|---|---|---|
| Alameda | 284,876 | 75.52% | 69,686 | 18.47% | 22,649 | 6.00% | 215,190 | 57.05% | 377,211 |
| Alpine | 293 | 61.30% | 160 | 33.47% | 25 | 5.23% | 133 | 27.82% | 478 |
| Amador | 5,128 | 33.91% | 9,505 | 62.85% | 491 | 3.25% | -4,377 | -28.94% | 15,124 |
| Butte | 25,777 | 43.55% | 30,827 | 52.08% | 2,582 | 4.36% | -5,050 | -8.53% | 59,186 |
| Calaveras | 5,390 | 33.12% | 10,336 | 63.51% | 549 | 3.37% | -4,946 | -30.39% | 16,275 |
| Colusa | 1,294 | 32.26% | 2,581 | 64.35% | 136 | 3.39% | -1,287 | -32.09% | 4,011 |
| Contra Costa | 197,056 | 66.30% | 85,419 | 28.74% | 14,745 | 4.96% | 111,637 | 37.56% | 297,220 |
| Del Norte | 2,514 | 40.06% | 3,489 | 55.60% | 272 | 4.33% | -975 | -15.54% | 6,275 |
| El Dorado | 29,089 | 40.14% | 41,054 | 56.66% | 2,318 | 3.20% | -11,965 | -16.51% | 72,461 |
| Fresno | 79,368 | 46.18% | 84,583 | 49.22% | 7,906 | 4.60% | -5,215 | -3.03% | 171,857 |
| Glenn | 1,628 | 27.02% | 4,207 | 69.83% | 190 | 3.15% | -2,579 | -42.80% | 6,025 |
| Humboldt | 22,387 | 61.52% | 11,537 | 31.70% | 2,466 | 6.78% | 10,850 | 29.82% | 36,390 |
| Imperial | 12,943 | 54.75% | 9,220 | 39.00% | 1,478 | 6.25% | 3,723 | 15.75% | 23,641 |
| Inyo | 2,541 | 44.52% | 2,874 | 50.36% | 292 | 5.12% | -333 | -5.83% | 5,707 |
| Kern | 54,527 | 39.19% | 78,958 | 56.75% | 5,638 | 4.05% | -24,431 | -17.56% | 139,123 |
| Kings | 7,842 | 36.93% | 12,680 | 59.72% | 712 | 3.35% | -4,838 | -22.78% | 21,234 |
| Lake | 7,140 | 47.00% | 7,177 | 47.24% | 875 | 5.76% | -37 | -0.24% | 15,192 |
| Lassen | 1,454 | 20.50% | 5,441 | 76.71% | 198 | 2.79% | -3,987 | -56.21% | 7,093 |
| Los Angeles | 1,306,631 | 65.93% | 565,077 | 28.51% | 110,142 | 5.56% | 741,554 | 37.42% | 1,981,850 |
| Madera | 11,323 | 37.34% | 17,869 | 58.93% | 1,131 | 3.73% | -6,546 | -21.59% | 30,323 |
| Marin | 71,271 | 76.79% | 17,197 | 18.53% | 4,349 | 4.69% | 54,074 | 58.26% | 92,817 |
| Mariposa | 2,396 | 36.81% | 3,868 | 59.43% | 245 | 3.76% | -1,472 | -22.61% | 6,509 |
| Mendocino | 14,713 | 61.86% | 7,824 | 32.90% | 1,246 | 5.24% | 6,889 | 28.97% | 23,783 |
| Merced | 20,721 | 47.78% | 20,541 | 47.37% | 2,103 | 4.85% | 180 | 0.42% | 43,365 |
| Modoc | 619 | 24.22% | 1,877 | 73.44% | 60 | 2.35% | -1,258 | -49.22% | 2,556 |
| Mono | 1,954 | 55.04% | 1,430 | 40.28% | 166 | 4.68% | 524 | 14.76% | 3,550 |
| Monterey | 49,466 | 63.66% | 24,796 | 31.91% | 3,447 | 4.44% | 24,670 | 31.75% | 77,709 |
| Napa | 24,698 | 63.58% | 12,309 | 31.69% | 1,840 | 4.74% | 12,389 | 31.89% | 38,847 |
| Nevada | 20,983 | 52.73% | 17,309 | 43.50% | 1,500 | 3.77% | 3,674 | 9.23% | 39,792 |
| Orange | 357,195 | 48.17% | 358,665 | 48.37% | 25,626 | 3.46% | -1,470 | -0.20% | 741,486 |
| Placer | 62,863 | 42.91% | 79,034 | 53.95% | 4,586 | 3.13% | -16,171 | -11.04% | 146,483 |
| Plumas | 2,774 | 38.39% | 4,209 | 58.25% | 243 | 3.36% | -1,435 | -19.86% | 7,226 |
| Riverside | 256,698 | 49.43% | 243,125 | 46.82% | 19,473 | 3.75% | 13,573 | 2.61% | 519,296 |
| Sacramento | 219,442 | 59.12% | 133,510 | 35.97% | 18,198 | 4.90% | 85,932 | 23.15% | 371,150 |
| San Benito | 8,678 | 55.53% | 6,305 | 40.35% | 644 | 4.12% | 2,373 | 15.19% | 15,627 |
| San Bernardino | 185,013 | 48.99% | 177,053 | 46.88% | 15,567 | 4.12% | 7,960 | 2.11% | 377,633 |
| San Diego | 459,531 | 56.24% | 327,376 | 40.07% | 30,170 | 3.69% | 132,155 | 16.17% | 817,077 |
| San Francisco | 200,250 | 82.17% | 30,445 | 12.49% | 13,004 | 5.34% | 169,805 | 69.68% | 243,699 |
| San Joaquin | 63,409 | 49.38% | 59,920 | 46.66% | 5,093 | 3.97% | 3,489 | 2.72% | 128,422 |
| San Luis Obispo | 50,337 | 52.37% | 42,625 | 44.35% | 3,150 | 3.28% | 7,712 | 8.02% | 96,112 |
| San Mateo | 134,404 | 72.22% | 43,357 | 23.30% | 8,330 | 4.48% | 91,047 | 48.93% | 186,091 |
| Santa Barbara | 63,160 | 59.69% | 38,394 | 36.29% | 4,258 | 4.02% | 24,766 | 23.41% | 105,812 |
| Santa Clara | 262,403 | 66.91% | 111,181 | 28.35% | 18,614 | 4.75% | 151,222 | 38.56% | 392,198 |
| Santa Cruz | 58,861 | 74.14% | 16,007 | 20.16% | 4,529 | 5.70% | 42,854 | 53.97% | 79,397 |
| Shasta | 15,485 | 31.03% | 33,123 | 66.38% | 1,294 | 2.59% | -17,638 | -35.35% | 49,902 |
| Sierra | 409 | 35.72% | 702 | 61.31% | 34 | 2.97% | -293 | -25.59% | 1,145 |
| Siskiyou | 5,056 | 37.36% | 7,983 | 58.98% | 495 | 3.66% | -2,927 | -21.63% | 13,534 |
| Solano | 56,975 | 59.10% | 34,829 | 36.13% | 4,595 | 4.77% | 22,146 | 22.97% | 96,399 |
| Sonoma | 111,367 | 70.25% | 38,506 | 24.29% | 8,666 | 5.47% | 72,861 | 45.96% | 158,539 |
| Stanislaus | 42,229 | 44.82% | 48,996 | 52.00% | 2,998 | 3.18% | -6,767 | -7.18% | 94,223 |
| Sutter | 7,709 | 34.39% | 13,847 | 61.77% | 861 | 3.84% | -6,138 | -27.38% | 22,417 |
| Tehama | 4,160 | 25.69% | 11,538 | 71.26% | 494 | 3.05% | -7,378 | -45.57% | 16,192 |
| Trinity | 1,472 | 42.92% | 1,792 | 52.24% | 166 | 4.84% | -320 | -9.33% | 3,430 |
| Tulare | 25,991 | 38.03% | 40,105 | 58.68% | 2,246 | 3.29% | -14,114 | -20.65% | 68,342 |
| Tuolumne | 7,231 | 37.00% | 11,576 | 59.24% | 734 | 3.76% | -4,345 | -22.24% | 19,541 |
| Ventura | 119,877 | 55.75% | 87,441 | 40.66% | 7,715 | 3.59% | 32,436 | 15.08% | 215,033 |
| Yolo | 37,819 | 66.50% | 15,698 | 27.60% | 3,351 | 5.89% | 22,121 | 38.90% | 56,868 |
| Yuba | 5,671 | 34.75% | 10,007 | 61.32% | 642 | 3.93% | -4,336 | -26.57% | 16,320 |
| Totals | 5,092,491 | 58.70% | 3,187,180 | 36.74% | 395,527 | 4.56% | 1,905,311 | 21.96% | 8,675,198 |

== General election ==
=== Predictions ===
| Source | Ranking | As of |
|---|---|---|
| Sabato's Crystal Ball | Safe D | August 7, 2025 |

=== Post-primary endorsements ===
Shirley Weber (D)

Organizations

- EMILYs List
- Reproductive Freedom for All

=== Polling ===
| Poll source | Date(s) administered | Sample size (Note: Key: A – all adults RV – registered voters LV – likely voters V – unclear) | Margin of error | Shirley Weber (D) | Donald P. Wagner (R) | Other | Undecided |
|---|---|---|---|---|---|---|---|
| Independent Voter Project | September 23 – October 2, 2026 | 2,906 (LV) | ± 2.5% | 41% | 31% | 2% (Note: "Would skip the race" with 2%) | 26% |

=== Results ===
2026 California Secretary of State election
| Party | Candidate | Votes | % | ±% |
|---|---|---|---|---|
| Democratic | Shirley Weber (incumbent) | | | |
| Republican | Donald P. Wagner | | | |
| Total votes | | | | |

Counties that flipped from Republican to Democratic

- Butte (largest municipality: Chico)
- Fresno (largest municipality: Fresno)
- Inyo (largest municipality: Bishop)
- Kern (largest municipality: Bakersfield)
- Merced (largest municipality: Merced)
- Orange (largest municipality: Anaheim)
- Riverside (largest municipality: Riverside)
- San Bernardino (largest municipality: San Bernardino)
- Stanislaus (largest municipality: Modesto)
- Tulare (largest municipality: Visalia)

== See also ==
- 2026 California elections
- 2026 United States secretary of state elections
