= Electoral history of the Green Party of the United States =

This is a list detailing the electoral history of the Green Party of the United States.

== Best results in major races ==
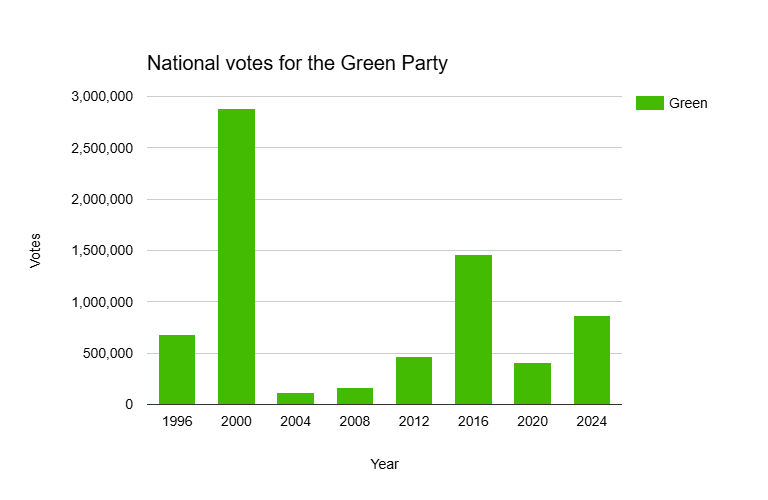
National votes for the Greens at presidential elections.

Bold indicates race where Green candidate was elected to office

Office	Percent	District	Year	Candidate
President	10.07%	Alaska	2000	Ralph Nader
President	6.92%	Vermont	2000	Ralph Nader
President	6.42%	Massachusetts	2000	Ralph Nader
US Senate	20.5%	Arkansas	2008	Rebekah Kennedy
US Senate	15.4%	District of Columbia	2018 (Note: Not recognized as a Senate election by the federal government, and shadow senators do not serve in Congress in any capacity.)	Eleanor Ory
US Senate	14.3%	District of Columbia	2006 (Note: Not recognized as a Senate election by the federal government, and shadow senators do not serve in Congress in any capacity.)	Joyce Robinson-Paul
US House	31.5%	Arizona District 8	2016	Mark Salazar
US House	27.5%	California District 34	2018	Kenneth Mejia
US House	23.2%	Arkansas District 2	2008	Deb McFarland
Governor	10.4%	Illinois	2006	Rich Whitney
Governor	10.3%	New Mexico	1994	Roberto Mondragón
Governor	9.5%	Maine	2006	Pat LaMarche
Other statewide	32.7%	New Mexico State Treasurer	1994	Lorenzo Garcia
Other statewide	32.4%	Arkansas State Treasurer	2010	Bobby Tullis
Other statewide	26.7%	Arkansas Attorney General	2010	Rebekah Kennedy
State Legislature	**67.1%**	**Maine District 38**	**2002**	**John Eder**
State Legislature	**50.9%**	**Maine District 118**	**2004**	**John Eder**
State Legislature	48.4%	Maine District 118	2006	**John Eder**

== Federal elections ==
Results from 1991-1994 represent the unified Greens/Green Party USA (G/GPUSA), from 1995-2001 the G/GPUSA faction Association of State Green Parties (ASGP), and 2001 onward the modern Green Party of the United States (GPUS).

=== Presidential elections ===
Year	Presidential/vice presidential candidate	Popular votes	Percentage	Electoral votes	Image
2024	Jill Stein/Butch Ware (campaign)	868,963	0.6% (Third)	0 EV	
2020	Howie Hawkins/Angela Walker (campaign)	407,068	0.3% (Fourth)	0 EV	
2016	Jill Stein/Ajamu Baraka (campaign)	1,457,218	1.1% (Fourth)	0 EV (Note: While Stein and Baraka did not receive any electoral votes, Green Winona LaDuke received one vote for Vice President from a Washington faithless elector; the presidential vote went to Faith Spotted Eagle, a Democrat.)	
2012	Jill Stein/Cheri Honkala (campaign)	469,627	0.4% (Fourth)	0 EV	
2008	Cynthia McKinney/Rosa Clemente (campaign) (Note: Ralph Nader and Matt Gonzalez, a Green, ran an independent campaign and received 0.6% of the vote, but they were not affiliated with the Green Party.)	161,797	0.1% (Sixth)	0 EV	
2004	David Cobb/Pat LaMarche (campaign) (Note: Ralph Nader and Peter Camejo, a Green, ran an independent campaign and received 0.4% of the vote; however, they were not affiliated with the Green Party.)	119,859	0.1% (Sixth)	0 EV	
2000	Ralph Nader/Winona LaDuke (campaign)	2,882,897	2.7% (Third)	0 EV	
1996	Ralph Nader/Winona LaDuke (campaign) (Note: Nader was not formally nominated by the party itself, but he did receive the endorsement of a large number of state parties and is considered as the de facto Green Party candidate.) (Note: In Iowa and Vermont, Anne Goeke was Nader's running mate, in New Jersey it was Madelyn Hoffman and in New York it was Muriel Tillinghast.)	684,902	0.7% (Fourth)	0 EV	

=== Presidential ballot access ===
	1996	2000	2004	2008	2012	2016	2020	2024
Number of states + D.C. (number of write-in states)	22 (14)	44 (4)	28 (14)	33 (10)	37 (6)	45 (3)	30 (17)	45 (7)
Possible electoral votes (possible write-in electoral votes)	239 (200) (Note: Electoral vote allocation for 1996 and 2000 based on 1990 census.)	481 (32)	294 (201) (Note: Electoral vote allocation for 2004 and 2008 based on 2000 census.)	413 (68)	439 (47) (Note: Electoral vote allocation for 2012, 2016 and 2020 based on 2010 census.)	480 (42)	381 (133)	+508 (69) (Note: Electoral vote allocation for 2024 based on 2020 census)
Alabama	Not on ballot	On ballot	Not on ballot		On ballot		(write-in)	On ballot
Alaska	On ballot			Not on ballot	On ballot		(write-in) (Note: Green Party of Alaska, despite having ballot access, did not place the GPUS nominee Howie Hawkins on the ballot.)	On ballot
Arizona	(write-in)	On ballot	(write-in)	On ballot			(write-in)	On ballot
Arkansas	On ballot							
California	On ballot							
Colorado	On ballot							
Connecticut	On ballot			(write-in)		On ballot		
Delaware	(write-in)	On ballot						
District of Columbia	On ballot							
Florida	On ballot							
Georgia	Not on ballot	(write-in)						On ballot
Hawaii	On ballot							
Idaho	Not on ballot	(write-in)			On ballot			(write-in)
Illinois	(write-in)	On ballot	(write-in)	On ballot				(write-in)
Indiana	(write-in)							Not on ballot
Iowa	On ballot							(write-in)
Kansas	(write-in)	On ballot	(write-in)			On ballot	(write-in)	(write-in)
Kentucky	(write-in)	On ballot	Not on ballot		On ballot		(write-in)	On ballot
Louisiana	On ballot						Not on ballot	On ballot
Maine	On ballot							
Maryland	(write-in)	On ballot						
Massachusetts	(write-in)	On ballot						
Michigan	(write-in)	On ballot						
Minnesota	On ballot							
Mississippi	Not on ballot	On ballot						
Missouri	(write-in)	On ballot	Not on ballot	(write-in)	Not on ballot	On ballot		
Montana	Not on ballot	On ballot		(write-in)	Not on ballot	On ballot	(write-in)	On ballot
Nebraska	Not on ballot	On ballot			Not on ballot	On ballot	(write-in)	On ballot
Nevada	On ballot				Not on ballot			
New Hampshire	Not on ballot	On ballot	Not on ballot	(write-in)		On ballot	(write-in)	On ballot
New Jersey	On ballot							
New Mexico	On ballot							
New York	On ballot		(write-in)	On ballot				(write-in)
North Carolina	(write-in)	Not on ballot	(write-in)		Not on ballot	(write-in)	On ballot	
North Dakota	Not on ballot	On ballot	Not on ballot		On ballot		(write-in)	Not on ballot
Ohio	(write-in)	On ballot	(write-in)	On ballot				
Oklahoma	Not on ballot							
Oregon	On ballot							
Pennsylvania	(write-in)	On ballot		Not on ballot	On ballot		(write-in)	On ballot
Rhode Island	On ballot						(write-in)	On ballot
South Carolina	Not on ballot	On ballot						
South Dakota	Not on ballot							
Tennessee	Not on ballot	On ballot	(write-in)	On ballot				
Texas	(write-in)	On ballot	(write-in)	On ballot				
Utah	On ballot		(write-in)	On ballot				
Vermont	On ballot		Not on ballot	(write-in)		On ballot		(write-in)
Virginia	Not on ballot	On ballot	(write-in)	On ballot			(write-in)	On ballot
Washington	On ballot							
West Virginia	Not on ballot	On ballot	(write-in)	On ballot				
Wisconsin	On ballot						(write-in)	On ballot
Wyoming	Not on ballot	(write-in)	Not on ballot			On ballot	(write-in)	

=== House of Representatives ===
Election year	No. of overall general election votes	% of overall vote	No. of overall seats won	+/-
1992	134,072	0.14	0 / 435	
1994	52,096	0.07	0 / 435	
1996	42,510	0.05	0 / 435	
1998	70,932	0.11	0 / 435	
2000	260,087	0.26	0 / 435	
2002	297,187	0.40	0 / 435	
2004	344,549	0.30	0 / 435	
2006	243,391	0.29	0 / 435	
2008	580,263	0.47	0 / 435	
2010	252,688	0.29	0 / 435	
2012	372,996	0.30	0 / 435	
2014	246,567	0.30	0 / 435	
2016	515,263	0.42?	0 / 435	
2018	276,877	0.22	0 / 435	
2020	90,121	0.06	0 / 435	
2022	69,802	0.06	0 / 435	
2024	182,841	0.12	0 / 435	

=== Senate ===
Election year	No. of overall general election votes	% of overall vote	No. of overall seats won	+/-
2000	685,289	0.90	0 / 34	
2002	94,702	0.20	0 / 34	
2004	157,671	0.20	0 / 34	
2006	295,935	0.50	0 / 33	
2008	427,427	0.70	0 / 33	
2010	516,517	0.80	0 / 37	
2012	212,103	0.20	0 / 33	
2014	152,555	0.32	0 / 33	
2016	695,604	0.72	0 / 33	
2018	200,599 (Note: Does not include 30,992 votes from 2018 United States Shadow Senator election in the District of Columbia)	0.22	0 / 33	
2020	258,348	0.03	0 / 33	
2022	87,964	0.10	0 / 35	
2024	288,495	0.??	0 / 34	

== Local elections ==
In 2014, according to the Green Party's election database, they participated in 286 races and won 54 of them. The majority of these races were for non-partisan offices.

== See also ==
- Green Party of the United States articles:
  - List of Green politicians who have held office in the United States
  - History of the Green Party of the United States
- Other lists:
  - List of socialist members of the United States Congress
  - List of elected socialist mayors in the United States
  - List of Democratic Socialists of America public officeholders
