= Green Party of the United States =

Political party in the United States

- Governing body: Green National Committee
- Co-chairs: Craig Cayetano (NJ); Tamar Yager (VA); Arshia Papari (TX); Wissam Charafeddine (MI); Cassandra Lems (NY); Kalia Fitzgerald (NC); Ann Link (NY)
- Founders: Howie Hawkins; John Rensenbrink
- Split from: Greens/Green Party USA
- Headquarters: Takoma Park, Maryland
- Youth wing: Young EcoSocialists
- Women's wing: National Women's Caucus
- LGBT wing: Lavender Greens Caucus
- Minority wing: National Black Caucus
- Registered voters (July 2026): 255,119 (0.20%)
- Ideology: Green politics; Progressivism (US); Eco-socialism
- Political position: Left-wing
- Regional affiliation: São Paulo Forum (2019-2025)
- International affiliation: Global Greens (2001–2024)
- Colors: Green
- Seats in the Senate: 0 / 100
- Seats in the House of Representatives: 0 / 435
- State governorships: 0 / 50
- Seats in state upper chambers: 0 / 1,972
- Seats in state lower chambers (Note: Paʻele Kiakona, elected to the Hawaii House of Representatives from District 14.): 1 / 5,411
- Territorial governorships: 0 / 5
- Seats in territorial upper chambers: 0 / 97
- Seats in territorial lower chambers: 0 / 91
- Other elected officials: 160 (November 2026)

Election symbol

Website
- www.gp.org

The Green Party of the United States (Greens or GPUS) is a federation of state Green Parties in the United States. The party promotes green politics, specifically environmentalism, nonviolence, social justice, participatory democracy, anti-war, and anti-racism.

The first green party in the United States, the Green Party was officially formed on July 30, 2001. Party organizers sought to provide an alternative to Third Way politics in the Democratic Party and promote green politics via electoral action and local organizing. The Greens gained national attention during the 2000 presidential election, when the ticket composed of Ralph Nader and Winona LaDuke won 2.7% of the popular vote.

The Greens support economic progressive positions including single-payer healthcare, free college, a job guarantee, a carbon tax, a Green New Deal, and reparations for slavery. The Greens support cultural liberal positions including drug decriminalization, transgender health care, youth rights, and abortion rights. The Greens support joining the International Criminal Court, ratifying the Comprehensive Nuclear-Test-Ban Treaty, and ending United States aid to Israel.

As of 2026, the Greens are the 4th-largest political party in the United States by voter registration, below the Libertarian Party and above the Conservative Party of New York State, (Note: Voter registration ranks are listed here. This list excludes the many different "Independent" parties, with which many voters register in error, and which usually do not run any competitive candidates.) and 3rd-largest by Presidential vote.

== History ==
In 1984, the Green movement began as the decentralized Green Committees of Correspondence, which evolved into a more centralized structure by 1990 with forming leadership, bylaws, and a platform.The organization conducted grassroots organizing efforts, educational activities and electoral campaigns. Co-founders included John Rensenbrink and Howie Hawkins.

The Greens had long been divided between fundis, who saw electoral politics as corrupting and wanted to focus on local activism, and realos, who saw electoral politics as a crucial engine of social change. These factions compromised at the 1990 Green National Convention, which would form the Greens/Green Party USA (G/GPUSA) in 1991. In 1990, the realo faction created the Green Politics Network, and in 1996, the Association of State Green Parties (ASGP), which sought to run Greens in elections and form a nationwide Green party. The ASGP encouraged and backed Nader's presidential runs in 1996 and 2000. The G/GPUSA-ASGP split grew, and in 2001, the two formally split. The ASGP formed an official national party, recognized by the FEC, soon renamed the Green Party of the United States (GPUS). Most state affiliates joined the ASGP. In 2019, the G/GPUSA dissolved. In 2019, the GPUS joined the São Paulo Forum.

In the 2000 presidential election, the Nader campaign won 2,882,955 votes (2.74%), placing 3rd, the highest Green vote total and share then or since. The Nader campaign led to a massive increase of voter registration and donations for the Green party. The Nader campaign was criticized by some political analysts, academics, and Democrats as spoiling the election toward Republican George W. Bush. In 2008, Nader rejected this, saying Al Gore could have won in other ways. In 2019, Nader said he regretted not entering the 2000 Democratic primary, but strongly rejected the label "spoiler" for himself or Jill Stein.

In 2012, the Stein campaign won 469,627 votes (0.36%), placing 4th. This was the best Green performance by far since Nader in 2000.

In 2016, the Stein campaign won 1,457,218 votes (1.07%), placing 3rd. After his campaign lost the presidential primary, Independent Senator Bernie Sanders told supporters to vote Clinton, not Green, to avoid a "protest vote" that splits the left-of-center vote. After the general, Democrats again criticized the Green Party as spoiling the election to Donald Trump.

In 2020, the Hawkins campaign won 407,068 votes (0.26%), placing 4th. The Hawkins campaign led to renewed interest in a dues-paying membership Green Party, rather than one based on state parties. The New York Times highlighted several instances where Republicans worked to get the Green Party on ballots in close races, hoping that it would split votes from Democratic candidates.

In late 2020, the Alaska Green Party decided to nominate former Reform Governor of Minnesota Jesse Ventura and the 2008 Green Party presidential nominee Cynthia McKinney for president and vice president, instead of Howie Hawkins and Angela Nicole Walker, candidates who won the 2020 Green Party presidential primaries. As a result of this decision, the GPAK was disaccredited from the GPUS. In June 2021, the Georgia Green Party was disaccredited due to adopting anti-LGBT policy positions. The Green Party of Rhode Island left the GPUS in 2020.

Stein at the Free & Equal Elections 2024 debate.

In 2024, the Stein campaign won 862,049 votes (0.56%), placing 3rd. In September, Democratic Congressmember Alexandria Ocasio-Cortez criticized the Green Party's political strategy as "not serious", a failure to build political power at the local level, and only "show[ing] up every four years" to run presidential candidates, contrasting it to the Working Families Party. Stein would respond on X and The Breakfast Club, calling the WFP a "second ballot line" for the Democratic Party due to voter fusion. In the interview, she also disputed the claim the party only runs every four years, noting over 1,500 candidates were running in 2024 and that the party runs in presidential election years to retain ballot access nationally. In November, the Global Greens alliance and European Green Party broke ties with the US Green Party, asking Stein to withdraw her candidacy for fear of spoiling the election to Trump. GPUS voted to rejoin the Global Greens in 2026.

In 2025, sixty-seven Green candidates won their elections, including; Michael Bagdes-Canning to a second term as mayor of Cherry Valley, Nate Fortune as the Town Administrator for Whately, Masschusetts, and Peter Schwartzman as the mayor for Galesburg, Illinois.

In 2026, the Green Party won twenty-three seats, including twenty-two local seats and one state house seat in the Hawaii House of Representatives (Pāʻele Kiakona). 75% of Green candidates who ran for local government positions in 2026 won their elections.

== Political positions ==
The Green Party supports green politics and eco-socialism. The Greens are usually described as progressive or left-wing.

The Green Party supports the four pillars of green politics, which it expands into the Ten Key Values:

1. Grassroots democracy,
2. Social justice and equal opportunity,
3. Ecological wisdom,
4. Nonviolence,
5. Decentralization,
6. Community-based economics,
7. Feminism and gender equity,
8. Respect for diversity,
9. Personal and global responsibility, and
10. Future focus and sustainability.

=== Economic issues ===
The Green Party supports the implementation of a single-payer healthcare system and the abolition of private health insurance in the United States. They have also called for contraception and abortion procedures to be available on demand. The Green Party has called for the repeal of the Hyde Amendment, an act that prohibits the use of federal taxpayer funds for abortions, unless in the cases of rape, incest, or to save the life of the mother.

The Green Party calls for providing tuition-free college at public universities and vocational schools, increasing funding for after-school and daycare programs, cancelling all student loan debt, and repealing the No Child Left Behind Act. They are strongly against the dissolution of public schools and the privatization of education.

In 2006, the Green Party developed a Green New Deal that would ultimately serve as a transitional plan to a 100% clean, renewable energy including solar and wind energy by 2030 utilizing a carbon tax, jobs guarantee, tuition-free college, single-payer healthcare and a focus on using public programs. Howie Hawkins focused his gubernatorial campaign on the Green New Deal, which was the first time the policy was introduced. Jill Stein also developed her presidential campaign based on the Green New Deal.

==== Eco-socialism ====
In 2016, the Green Party passed a motion in favor of rejecting both capitalism and state socialism, supporting instead an "alternative economic system based on ecology and decentralization of power". The motion states the change that the party says could be described as promoting "ecological socialism", "communalism", or perhaps the "cooperative commonwealth". The eco-socialist economy proposed by Howie Hawkins is similar to market socialism, with a large sector of democratically controlled public enterprises, a large sector of cooperative enterprises, and a smaller sector of small businesses and self-employed. Consumer goods and services would be sold to consumers in the market by cooperatives, public enterprises, and small businesses. Services that would be for free include health care, education, child care, and urban mass transit. Goods and services that would be available at low cost would include public housing, power, broadband, and water. Howie Hawkins, who was nominated by the Green Party to run for president of the United States in 2020, identifies as a libertarian socialist.

=== Social issues ===
The Green Party favors the abolition of the death penalty, repeal of three-strikes laws, banning of private prisons, legalization of marijuana, and decriminalization of other drugs. The Green Party advocates for "complete and full" reparations to the African American community, as well the removal of the Confederate flag from all government buildings.

The party supports same-sex marriage, the right of access to medical and surgical treatment for transgender and gender-nonconforming people, and withdrawing foreign aid to countries with poor LGBT+ rights records. The party opposes gender-critical feminism.

The party supports youth rights. They reject the idea that young people are property of their parents or guardians. They support providing mothers with prenatal care. They oppose child abuse and neglect and support young people's rights to food, shelter, healthcare, and education. They support greater student input into their education and sex education and oppose advertisements in schools. They support lowering the voting age to 16.

=== Democratic reforms ===
The Green Party does not accept donations from corporations, political action committees (PACs), 527(c) organizations or soft money. The party's platforms and rhetoric harshly criticize corporate influence and control over government, media, and society at large.

In the early decades of Green organizing in the United States, the prevailing American system of money-dominated elections was universally rejected by Greens, so that some Greens were reluctant to have Greens participate in the election system at all because they deemed the campaign finance system inherently corrupt. Other Greens felt strongly that the Green Party should develop in the electoral arena, and many of these Greens felt that adopting an alternative model of campaign finance, emphasizing self-imposed contribution limits, would present a wholesome and attractive contrast to the odious campaign finance practices of the money-dominated major parties.

Some Greens feel that the Green Party's position should be simply to follow the laws and regulations of campaign finance. Other Greens argue that it would injure the Green Party not to practice a principled stand against the anti-democratic influence of money in the political process. Candidates for office, like Jill Stein, the 2012 and 2016 Green Party nominee for the President of the United States, typically rely on smaller donations to fund their campaigns.

The Green Party supports statehood for Washington, D.C. and independence for Puerto Rico, as well as Samoa, Guam, the Northern Mariana Islands, and the Virgin Islands.

=== Foreign policy ===
The Green Party supports halving the U.S. defense budget, as well as prohibiting all arms sales to foreign countries. The Green Party is opposed to American military presence abroad, and in favor of United Nations-led interventions against states committing human rights abuses; during her 2016 presidential campaign, when asked if she would stop giving aid to Israel, Jill Stein answered in the affirmative, while also including Bahrain, Saudi Arabia, and Egypt. The Greens stand for global peace and disarmament, as well as de-nuclearization.

The Green Party and its affiliates have opposed American domination over Venezuela, and condemned Operation Southern Spear, as well as the kidnapping of Nicolás Maduro.

==== Iran ====
The Green Party calls on the United States to join the International Criminal Court and re-sign the Comprehensive Nuclear-Test-Ban Treaty and Non-Proliferation Treaty. The Greens want the sanctions against Iran from the United States to be ended, the de-nuclearization of Israel, and the normalization of American-Iranian relations. The party voted in favor of reparations to Iran, however the vote failed to reach quorum. In 2016, the Greens voted in favor of normalization of relations with Iran via finding a peaceful resolution to nuclearization of Iran. In 2025, the party's former presidential candidate Jill Stein spoke out against the Twelve-Day War between Iran, Israel, and the United States. When the Iran war began months later, the various state parties released statements condemning the conflict.

==== Occupied Palestinian Territories ====
The Green Party advocates for the Palestinian right of return and cutting all U.S. aid to Israel. It has also expressed support for the Boycott, Divestment and Sanctions (BDS) movement. The Green Party supports a bi-national one-state solution, calling for the establishment of a "secular, democratic state for Palestinians and Israelis on the land between the Mediterranean Sea and the River Jordan as the national home of both peoples, with Jerusalem as its capital." It advocates for the Palestinian right of return to the regions they were ethnically cleansed from in 1948. In 2004, the Green Party endorsed the Campaign to End the Israeli Occupation's Day of Solidarity, paying annual dues to the campaign.

In 2017, the Green Party opposed the Nation-State Bill introduced to the Israeli Knesset by Avi Dichter, which the party described as codifying apartheid, and called for the suspension of aid to countries that violate human rights.

After the October 7, 2023 Hamas-led incursion into Israel and the subsequent military operations in Gaza, the Green Party called for a ceasefire in the Gaza Strip and accused Israel of war crimes. The Green Party has recognized the actions of the IDF in Gaza as genocide.

On November 10, 2025, the Green Party voted 70-0 to designate the Israel Defense Forces as a terrorist organization. In October 2026, the Green Party of England and Wales passed the Zionism is Racism motion at their party conference, which resulted in Labour collapsing several power sharing agreements in local councils. The American Green Party passed their own internal motion, titled Zionism Is Racism: Green Party Opposition to Zionism and Support for Palestinian Liberation on November 8, 2026. The motion was based off of adherence to the 10-Key Pillars and an opposition to bigotry, rather than simply an endorsement of the GPEW's motion. It passed with a majority of 77 delegates in favor and four against, while four abstained. It is the first explicitly anti-Zionist political party in the United States.

== Structure and composition ==
=== National committees ===
The Green National Convention sets the priorities and leadership of the Green Party. The Convention is also the Greens' presidential nominating convention.

The Green National Committee (GNC) runs the Green Party inbetween conventions. The GNC is composed of delegates elected by affiliated state parties. The state parties also appoint delegates to serve on the various standing committees of the GNC. The National Committee elects a steering committee of seven co-chairs, a secretary and a treasurer to oversee daily operations. The National Committee performs most of its business online, but it also holds an annual national meeting to conduct business in person.

In addition, the Green Senatorial Campaign Committee (GSCC), which attempts to elect Green candidates to the United States Senate.

=== Membership ===
Most state Green Parties allow both registered voters and dues-paying members to vote on internal Green party elections and referendums. Over 2019-2021, Howie Hawkins argued that the Green Party should instead use a dues-paying membership model, similar to that of the Democratic Socialists of America and most European Green parties, where only dues-payers can control the party. In 2026, the Green National Committee considered a study of the proposal.

=== Registered voters ===
Voter registration with the Green Party of the United States by year (1986–2020)

As of July 2026 the Green Party has 255,119 (0.20%) registered voters, the 4th-highest in the United States. California has the most registered Greens, at 113,790 (0.49%), while Maine has the highest proportion, at 30,687 (3.42%). At its 2004 peak, the Green Party had 318,931 registered voters. The GPUS is the third-largest Green party in the world, ahead of the GP of England and Wales but behind the PV of Brazil and PVE of Mexico. The table below shows the total number of voters registered with the Green Party in each year.

Year	Registered voters
2024	249,276
2023	242,882
2022	238,552
2021	246,088
2020	248,071
2019	258,028
2018	257,939
2017	260,874
2016	258,444
2015	256,929
2014	251,900
2013	252,328
2012	251,976
2011	243,226
2010	248,488
2009	249,542
2008	262,050
2007	273,938
2006	297,285
2005	298,031
2004	318,931
2003	302,226
2002	277,241
2001	232,651
2000	204,321
1999	129,183
1998	123,650
1997	110,229
1996	113,440
1995	88,505
1994	92,094
1993	96,113
1992	102,830
1991	101,286
1990	9,552
1989	142
1988	109
1987	24
1986	24

== Officeholders ==
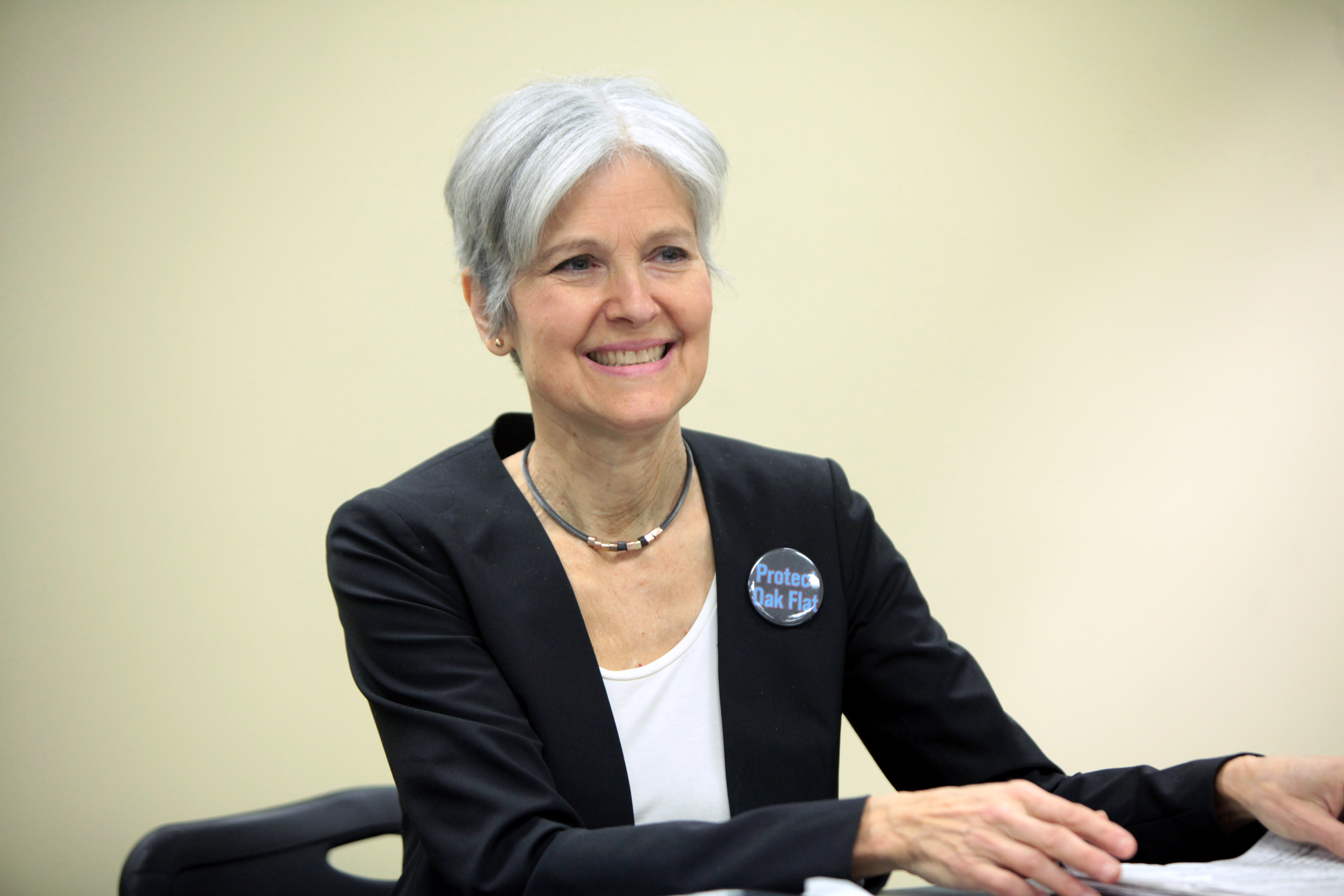
2012, 2016 and 2024 Green presidential nominee, Jill Stein, served from 2005 to 2010 as a member of Lexington's Town Meeting.

The Green Party has had limited electoral success at the state legislature and local level. Since the party's creation, 2 Greens have been elected to state legislatures and some other state legislators have switched parties after being originally elected as Democrats. The Green Party has never won a statewide or federal election.

Though some Green congressional candidates have topped 20%, no nominee of the Green Party has been elected to office in the federal government. In 2016, Mark Salazar set a new record for a Green Party nominee for Congress. Running in the Arizona 8th district against incumbent Republican Congressman Trent Franks, Salazar received 93,954 votes or 31.43%.

=== State legislatures ===
Paʻele Kiakona was elected to the Hawaii House of Representatives in 2026.

The Green Party has had limited electoral success in state legislatures. In 1999, Audie Bock was elected to the California State Assembly on the Green Party ballot line, but switched her registration to independent seven months later, running as such in the 2000 election.

In 2002, John Eder was elected to the Maine House of Representatives, re-elected in 2004, but defeated in 2006.

In 2008, Richard Carroll was elected to the Arkansas House of Representatives on the Green ballot line for ballot access reasons. Five months later, he switched parties to Democrat.

In 2010, former Green Party leader Ben Chipman was elected to the Maine House of Representatives as an unenrolled candidate and was re-elected in 2012 and 2014. In 2015, he registered as a Democrat, and served in the Maine Senate.

In 2026, Paʻele Kiakona was elected to the Hawaii House of Representatives as a candidate from District 14, defeating 4-year incumbent Republican Elle Cochran and Democrat Sne Patel.

=== Local offices ===
Gayle McLaughlin was twice elected mayor of Richmond, California, defeating two Democrats in 2006 and then reelected in 2010; and elected to City Council in 2014 after completing her second term as mayor. With a population of over 100,000 people, it was the largest American city with a Green mayor.

Fairfax, California; Arcata, California; Sebastopol, California; and New Paltz, New York are the only towns in the United States to have had a Green Party majority in their town councils. In 2012, Twin Ridges Elementary in Nevada County, California held the first Green Party majority school board in the United States.

The Green Party has seen its greatest local electoral success on the Pacific Coast, Upper Great Lakes, and Northeast. As of June 2007, Californians had elected 55 of the 226 office-holding Greens nationwide. Other states with high numbers of Green elected officials included Pennsylvania (31), Wisconsin (23), Massachusetts (18) and Maine (17). Madison, Wisconsin is the city with the most Green elected officials (8), followed by Portland, Maine (7).

=== Defections from other parties ===
In 2012, Fred Smith was elected to the Arkansas House of Representatives, but re-registered as a Democrat in 2014.

On September 21, 2017, Ralph Chapman, a member of the Maine House of Representatives, switched his party registration from unaffiliated to Green, providing the Green Party with their first state-level representative since 2014. Henry John Bear became a member of the Green Party in the same year, though Bear is a nonvoting tribal member.

== Electoral results ==
Results from 1991-1994 represent the unified G/GPUSA, from 1995-2001 the G/GPUSA faction Association of State Green Parties (ASGP), and 2001 onward the modern Green Party of the United States (GPUS).

=== Best results in major races ===
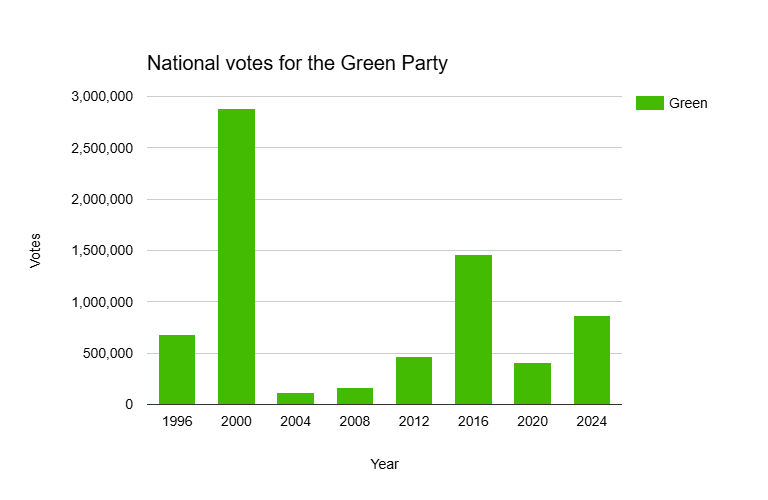
National votes for the Greens at presidential elections.

Bold indicates race where Green candidate was elected to office.

Office	Percent	District	Year	Candidate
President	10.07%	Alaska	2000	Ralph Nader
President	6.92%	Vermont	2000	Ralph Nader
President	6.42%	Massachusetts	2000	Ralph Nader
US Senate	20.5%	Arkansas	2008	Rebekah Kennedy
US Senate	15.4%	District of Columbia	2018 (Note: Not recognized as a Senate election by the federal government, and shadow senators do not serve in Congress in any capacity.)	Eleanor Ory
US Senate	14.3%	District of Columbia	2006 (Note: Not recognized as a Senate election by the federal government, and shadow senators do not serve in Congress in any capacity.)	Joyce Robinson-Paul
US House	31.5%	Arizona District 8	2016	Mark Salazar
US House	27.5%	California District 34	2018	Kenneth Mejia
US House	23.2%	Arkansas District 2	2008	Deb McFarland
Governor	10.4%	Illinois	2006	Rich Whitney
Governor	10.3%	New Mexico	1994	Roberto Mondragón
Governor	9.5%	Maine	2006	Pat LaMarche
Other statewide	32.7%	New Mexico State Treasurer	1994	Lorenzo Garcia
Other statewide	32.4%	Arkansas State Treasurer	2010	Bobby Tullis
Other statewide	26.7%	Arkansas Attorney General	2010	Rebekah Kennedy
State Legislature	**67.1%**	**Maine District 38**	**2002**	**John Eder**
State Legislature	**50.9%**	**Maine District 118**	**2004**	**John Eder**
State Legislature	48.4%	Maine District 118	2006	**John Eder**
State Legislature	**41.1%**	**Hawaii District 14**	**2026**	**Paʻele Kiakona**

=== Presidential elections ===
Year	Presidential/vice presidential candidate	Popular votes	Percentage	Electoral votes	Image
2024	**Jill Stein**/**Butch Ware** (campaign)	868,963	0.6% (Third)	0 EV	
2020	**Howie Hawkins**/**Angela Walker** (campaign)	407,068	0.3% (Fourth)	0 EV	
2016	**Jill Stein**/**Ajamu Baraka** (campaign)	1,457,218	1.1% (Fourth)	0 EV (Note: While Stein and Baraka did not receive any electoral votes, Green Winona LaDuke received one vote for Vice President from a Washington faithless elector; the presidential vote went to Faith Spotted Eagle, a Democrat.)	
2012	**Jill Stein**/**Cheri Honkala** (campaign)	469,627	0.4% (Fourth)	0 EV	
2008	**Cynthia McKinney**/**Rosa Clemente** (campaign) (Note: Ralph Nader and Matt Gonzalez, a Green, ran an independent campaign and received 0.6% of the vote, but they were not affiliated with the Green Party.)	161,797	0.1% (Sixth)	0 EV	
2004	**David Cobb**/**Pat LaMarche** (campaign) (Note: Ralph Nader and Peter Camejo, a Green, ran an independent campaign and received 0.4% of the vote; however, they were not affiliated with the Green Party.)	119,859	0.1% (Sixth)	0 EV	
2000	**Ralph Nader**/**Winona LaDuke** (campaign)	2,882,897	2.7% (Third)	0 EV	
1996	**Ralph Nader**/**Winona LaDuke** (campaign) (Note: Nader was not formally nominated by the party itself, but he did receive the endorsement of a large number of state parties and is considered as the de facto Green Party candidate.) (Note: In Iowa and Vermont, Anne Goeke was Nader's running mate, in New Jersey it was Madelyn Hoffman and in New York it was Muriel Tillinghast.)	684,902	0.7% (Fourth)	0 EV	

=== Spoiler controversies ===
==== 2000 ====
2000 United States Presidential election in Florida
- November 7, 2000
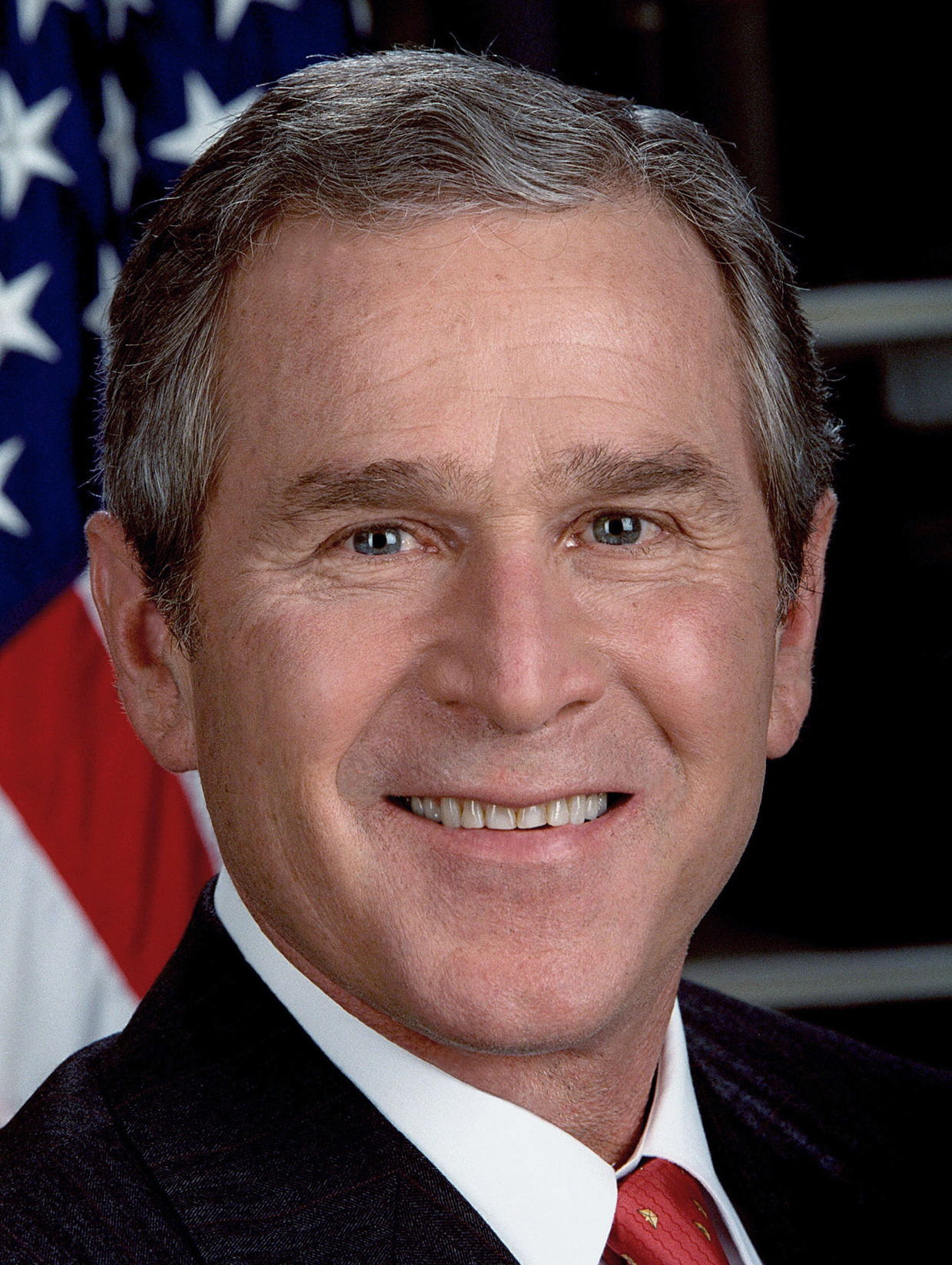

Party	Republican	Democratic	Green
Popular vote	2,912,253	2,912,253	97,488
Percentage	48.847%	48.838%	1.64%

During the 2000 Presidential election, in Florida, Republican candidate George W. Bush defeated Democratic Vice President Al Gore by 537 votes, while Nader received about 97,000. Many Democrats blamed Nader's candidacy for Gore's loss, and critics argued that most Nader voters would otherwise have supported Gore.

Estimates of how Nader's voters would have voted without him differ. Exit polling reported by The Christian Science Monitor indicated that 47% would have voted for Gore, 21% for Bush, and 32% would not have voted. Nader himself has cited exit polls indicating that 38% of his voters would have supported Gore, 25% Bush, and the rest would not have voted. A 2007 ballot-level study by political scientists Michael Herron and Jeffrey Lewis estimated that at most 60% of Nader's Florida voters would have voted for Gore and at least 40% for Bush. The authors concluded that the Gore-leaning share did make Nader a spoiler, but only because of the unprecedented closeness of the Florida result, and they cautioned that exit-poll samples of Nader voters were small.

Nader's supporters have noted that other candidates also received more votes than the 537-vote margin, including Pat Buchanan (R) (17,484) and Harry Browne (L) (16,415), and have argued that other factors contributed to Gore's defeat. Columnist Jim Hightower, citing an analysis of Florida exit polls by writer Tim Wise, wrote that about 308,000 Florida Democrats voted for Republican Bush compared with 24,000 who voted for Nader, that 191,000 self-described liberals voted for Bush compared with fewer than 34,000 for Nader, and that Gore lost the over-65 vote 51–47%. Researchers also found that the butterfly ballot used in Palm Beach County caused more than 2,000 Democratic voters to vote by mistake for Buchanan, a number larger than Bush's margin. The United States Commission on Civil Rights found that non-felons were removed from Florida's voter rolls through a state-sponsored felony purge, and a Palm Beach Post investigation found at least 1,100 eligible voters had been wrongly purged.

A review of 175,000 disputed Florida ballots commissioned by a consortium of news organizations and conducted by the NORC at the University of Chicago found that the partial recounts Gore pursued would still have left Bush ahead, while a full statewide recount of untallied ballots might have narrowly favored Gore. Nader and his supporters have rejected the characterization of his campaign as a spoiler. In interviews, Nader has pointed to Gore's loss of his home state of Tennessee, to the large number of Florida Democrats who voted for Bush, to problems with the administration of Florida's election, and to the Supreme Court's decision halting the recount, and has described the blame placed on his campaign as scapegoating. The figure he has cited for Florida Democrats who voted for Bush has varied between interviews, from about 250,000 to 300,000. The Green Party of the United States has made similar arguments in its own literature.

==== 2016 ====
2016 United States Presidential election in Michigan
- November 8, 2016

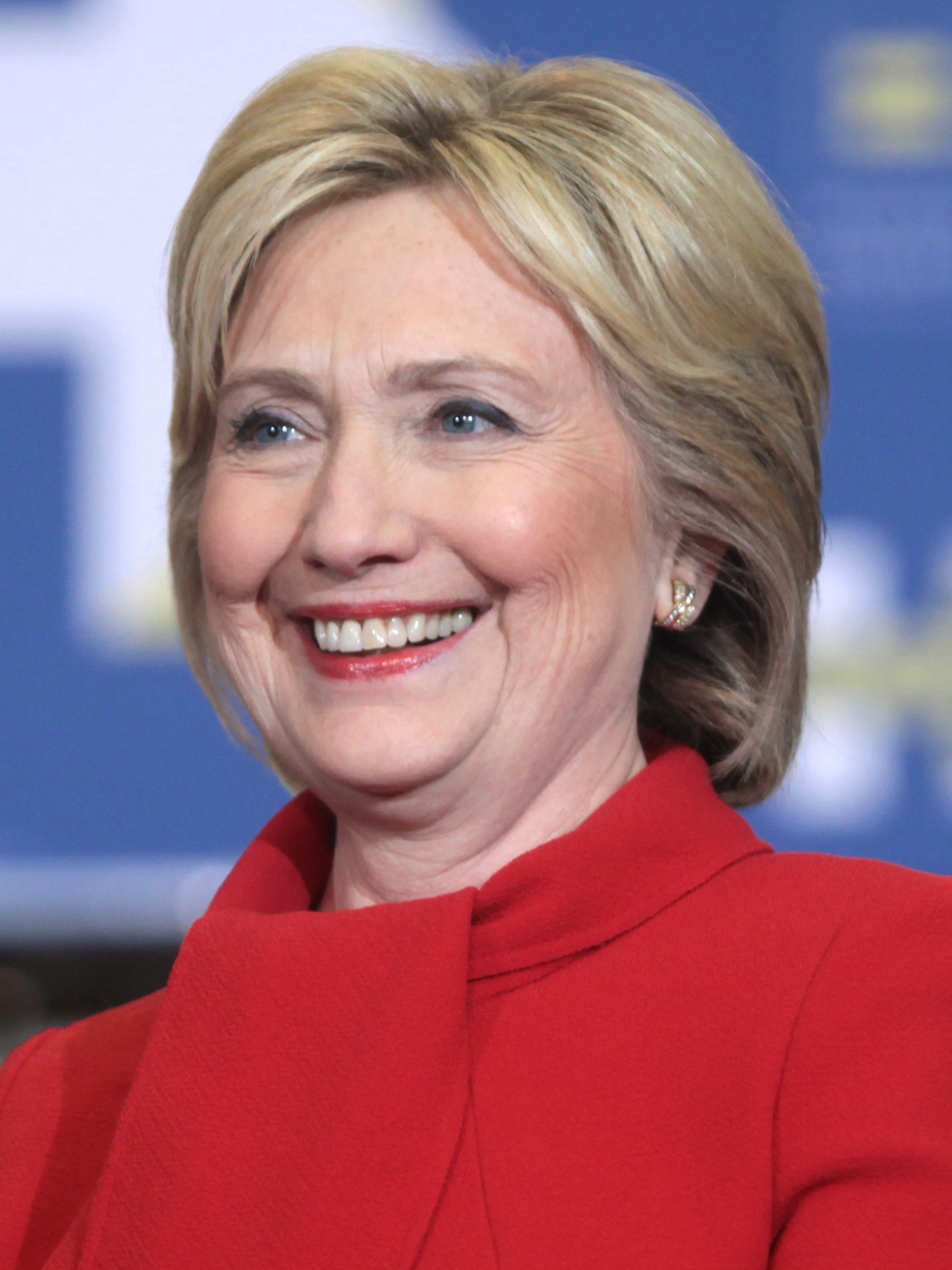

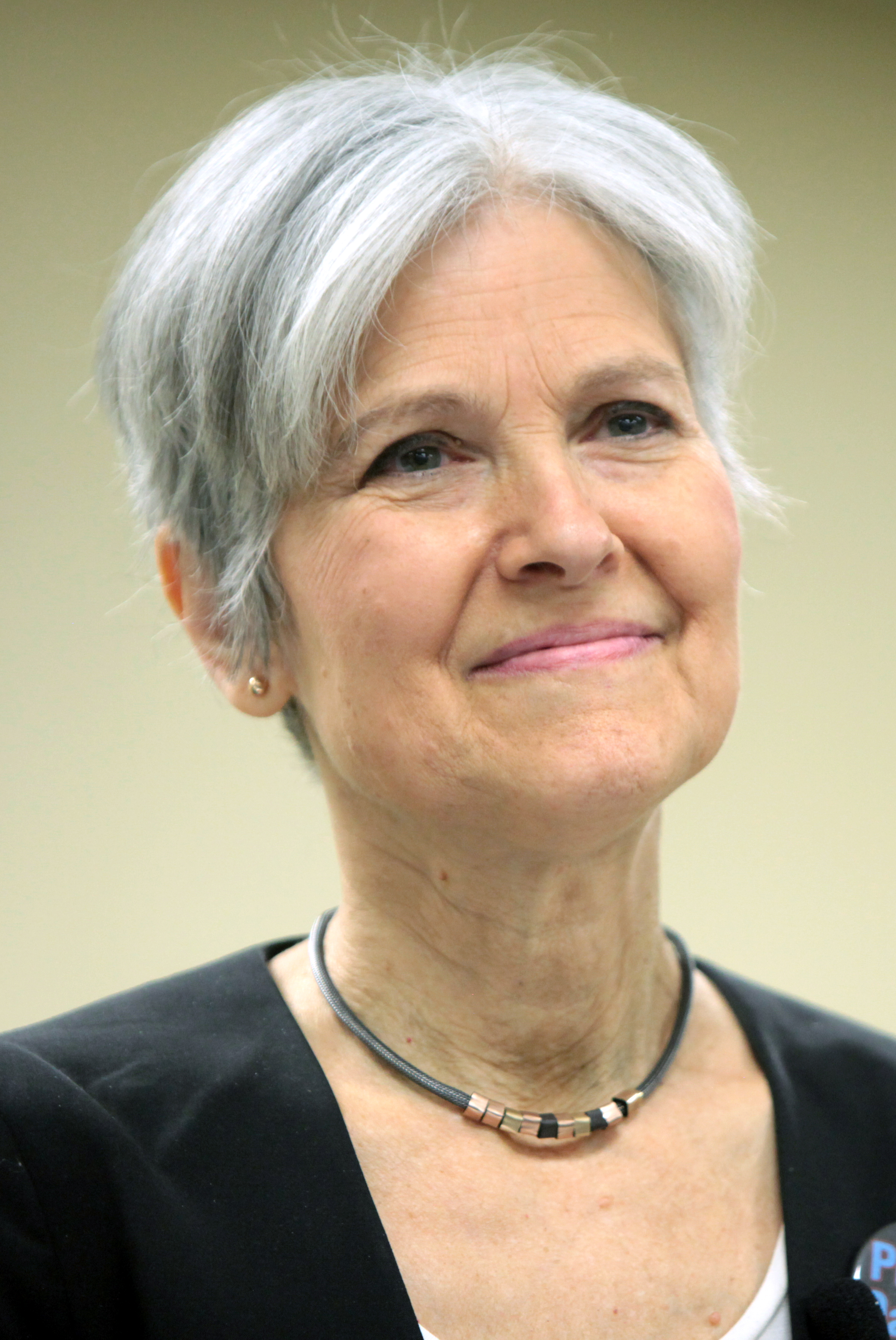
Party	Republican	Democratic	Green
popular vote	2,279,543	2,268,839	51,463
Percentage	47.50%	47.27%	1.07%

In the 2016 presidential election, the Republican nominee Donald Trump won Michigan, Wisconsin and Pennsylvania, which together carried 46 electoral votes, by margins smaller than the Jill Stein's vote totals in each state. Democratic nominee Hillary Clinton won the national popular vote by about 2.9 million votes while Trump won the Electoral College, as happened in the 2000 election Some Democrats, including the Democratic National Committee, have argued that Stein's candidacy was pivotal to Trump's victory.

Political scientists have noted that the claim depends on how Stein's voters would otherwise have voted. Clinton would have needed to win all three states to carry the Electoral College, contrasted with Gore just needing Florida. A CBS News exit poll asking voters whom they would have supported in a two-candidate race found that about 25% of Stein voters would have chosen Clinton, 14% Trump, and 61% would not have voted. Had these numbers been applied to each swing state, Clinton still would not hae been able to flip any. Among the Libertarian candidate Gary Johnson's voters, the figures were about 25%, 15% and 55%. Johnson received substantially more votes than Stein nationally (4.49 million to 1.46 million) and in Michigan (about 172,000 to 51,000). Political scientists have cautioned that studies of earlier third-party candidates suggest a substantial share of such voters would not have voted at all.

Analyses of the 2016 Cooperative Congressional Election Study found that about 74% of Bernie Sanders's primary voters voted for Clinton in the general election, 12% for Trump, 4.5% for Stein and 3% for Johnson, while about 3.5% did not vote. Political scientist Brian Schaffner noted that Sanders voters who voted for Trump in Michigan, Wisconsin and Pennsylvania would have been enough to change the outcome in those states had they supported Clinton or not voted, but that similar defection rates are common among losing primary candidates' supporters; about 12% of Republican primary voters voted for Clinton. .

Other analysts have emphasized Democratic turnout and campaign strategy. In Wayne County, Michigan, Clinton received about 76,000 fewer votes than Barack Obama had in 2012, in a state she lost by 10,704 votes, and in Milwaukee County, Wisconsin, about 43,000 fewer, in a state she lost by 22,748. Pollster Charles Franklin of Marquette Law School said the Clinton campaign scaled back its effort in Wisconsin, and advertising analysts estimated that Trump's campaign outspent Clinton's there by roughly $7 million to $3 million. Researchers have cautioned that the effect of candidate visits on vote share is uncertain.

Stein has rejected the spoiler characterization. She has cited exit polls indicating that most Green voters would have stayed home rather than vote for a major-party candidate, and has said that Greens "just don't vote for Democrats." Her campaign has also said that in a true democracy there is no such thing as a spoiler.

==== 2024 ====
Political cartoon criticizing RFK Jr., Jill Stein, and Cornel West for running for president.

In 2024, the Democratic party released its first-ever campaign ad against a third party targeting Jill Stein, accusing her of enabling Trump's victory in 2016, stating that a vote for Stein is a vote for Trump. In the lead up to the election, she faced criticism from Alexandria Ocasio-Cortez, podcaster Angela Rye, and journalist Mehdi Hasan for running for office. The Global Greens also called for Stein to drop out and endorse Kamala Harris.

In the closest state between Kamala Harris and Donald Trump where Stein was on the ballot, Wisconsin, Trump's margin still exceeded Kamala Harris's, even when all of Stein's votes were added to Harris's total.

== State and territorial parties ==
=== Current affiliates ===
- Arizona Green Party
- Green Party of Arkansas
- Green Party of California
- Green Party of Colorado
- Connecticut Green Party
- Green Party of Delaware
- D.C. Statehood Green Party
- Green Party of Florida
- Green Party of Montana
- Green Party of Hawaii
- Idaho Green Party
- Illinois Green Party
- Indiana Green Party
- Iowa Green Party
- Kansas Green Party
- Kentucky Green Party
- Green Party of Louisiana
- Maine Green Independent Party
- Maryland Green Party
- Green-Rainbow Party (Massachusetts)
- Green Party of Michigan
- Green Party of Minnesota
- Green Party of Mississippi
- Green Party of New York
- Nebraska Green Party
- Green Party of New Jersey
- North Carolina Green Party
- Green Party of Ohio
- Green Party of Oklahoma
- Pacific Green Party (Oregon)
- Green Party of Pennsylvania
- Ocean State Green Party (Rhode Island) (Note: The Green Party of Rhode Island was disaffiliated since December 29, 2020 due to endorsing Joe Biden for president during the 2020 United States presidential election. The Ocean State Green Party was created in its stead.)
- South Carolina Green Party
- Green Party of Texas
- Green Party of Utah
- Vermont Green Party
- Green Party of Virginia
- Green Party of Washington State
- Mountain Party (West Virginia)
- Wisconsin Green Party

=== Former affiliates ===
- Green Party of Alaska (Note: Disaffiliated since January 12, 2021 due to nominating Jesse Ventura as its presidential candidate for the 2020 United States presidential election.)
- Green Party of Georgia (Note: Deaccredited on July 26, 2021, due to the adoption of the Declaration on Women's sex-based rights in its party platform.)
- Green Party of Rhode Island

== See also ==
- 2000 United States presidential election
- History of the Green Party of the United States
- Electoral history of the Green Party of the United States
- Electoral fusion in the United States
- List of political parties in the United States
