= Georgia Green Party =

American state political party

- Registered: Unregistered
- Headquarters: Atlanta, Georgia, U.S.
- Ideology: Green politics Populism; Black Power; Anti-imperialism
- Political position: Syncretic; Historical: Left-wing
- National affiliation: Independent-Green Party US (since 2021); Green Party of the United States (until 2021)
- Colors: Green

Website
- georgiagreenparty.org

The Georgia Green Party (GGP) is a registered political body in the American state of Georgia. The party is not an affiliate of the Green Party US organization. The GGP has also been barred access from ballots multiple times, causing them to consider lawsuits.

In 2016, the Green Party of the United States advocated to have the GGP be registered by the Georgia General Assembly, though this was countered by the primarily Republican majority in the legislature. The GGP was disaffiliated from the national Green Party federation in 2021, due to the GGP adopting positions which were judged in opposition to the national party's stances in favor of transgender rights.

== Transphobia controversy and disaffiliation ==
On July 26, 2021, the Georgia Green Party was removed from the federation of the Green Party US by the National Committee of the Green Party US for passing amendments in the state Party manifesto that the Green Party US's Accreditation Committee said violated the Green Party's values, specifically against transgender and sexual minority rights. The Georgia Green Party passed amendments without first having a vote through Party members that restricted the rights of transgender and gender non-conforming people, such as supporting bathroom bills and a ban on transgender people in sporting events. A complaint was filed by the Lavender Caucus (the LGBTQ+ Caucus) in November 2020. On July 26, 2021, the National Committee of the Green Party of the United States voted with an 88% majority to remove the Georgia Green Party.

Supporters of the Georgia Green Party created a website called Dialogue Not Expulsion to argue against its disaccreditation. Among the documents available on this site is the Report of the Minority of the Accreditation Committee With respect to the Committee’s referral of the Complaint of the National Lavender Green Caucus Seeking the Revocation of Accreditation for the Georgia Green Party.

The current version of the Georgia Green Party's Platform includes measures related to gender-based rights and sex-based rights. In the Human Rights Chapter, Plank 5 reads:

We endorse stopping violence and discrimination against women, people of color, lesbians, gays, gender non-conforming people, including those who identify as transgender and nonbinary, the poor, the homeless, children, elders, immigrants, the differently-abled and the imprisoned.

Part of Plank 9 of the Human Rights chapter reads:

We support a prohibition on housing discrimination on the basis of age, children, race, ethnicity, gender, sex, sexual orientation, disability, HIV status, nationality, religious faith or lack of faith or practice.

In the same chapter, Plank 11 reads:

The Georgia Green Party here endorses the Declaration on Women’s Sex-Based Rights, as developed and publicized by the Women’s Human Rights Campaign, and encourage our members, our national party, policy makers and the general public to do the same. We will regulate access to gender-affirming therapies to protect Georgia children from medical experimentation, prosecuting ethical violations involved with subjecting children incapable of fully informed consent to such life-changing and irreversible procedures. We will protect women and girls from unfair competition in sports by male-bodied athletes. We will protect girls and women in the enjoyment of female-only facilities, programs, or services, particularly in places where women have a need to be in a state of undress, or where their privacy may be compromised or their safety may be at risk from male-pattern violence.

In the same chapter, Plank 13 reads:

The Georgia Green Party endorses passage of the Equality Act (HR-5 / SB-788, in the 116th Congress) as amended by the Feminist Amendment developed by FeministStruggle.org intended to protect the sex-based rights of women while adding to existing Civil Rights statutes related to employment, housing, credit and jury service, two new protected classes to protect people from discrimination based on 'sexual orientation' and 'sex stereotyping'. We further support the adoption of similar state level reforms.

In the platform's chapter entitled Family, Plank 1 reads:

Our view of family is welcoming of every committed voluntary loving partnership that Georgians might make with one another, that puts first, the support and care of whatever children may be a part of that family. We make this statement without concern for the sexual orientation, gender or gender-identity of the parents. We support access to adoption without discrimination based on one's gender or affectional preferences.

Plank 2 of the same chapter includes "We recognize a right to marry or to form similar committed relationships, regardless of sexual orientation, gender or gender identity."

== See also ==
- Green Party of the United States
- Green politics
