= Michael Donald Brown =

American politician (born 1953)

Mike Brown
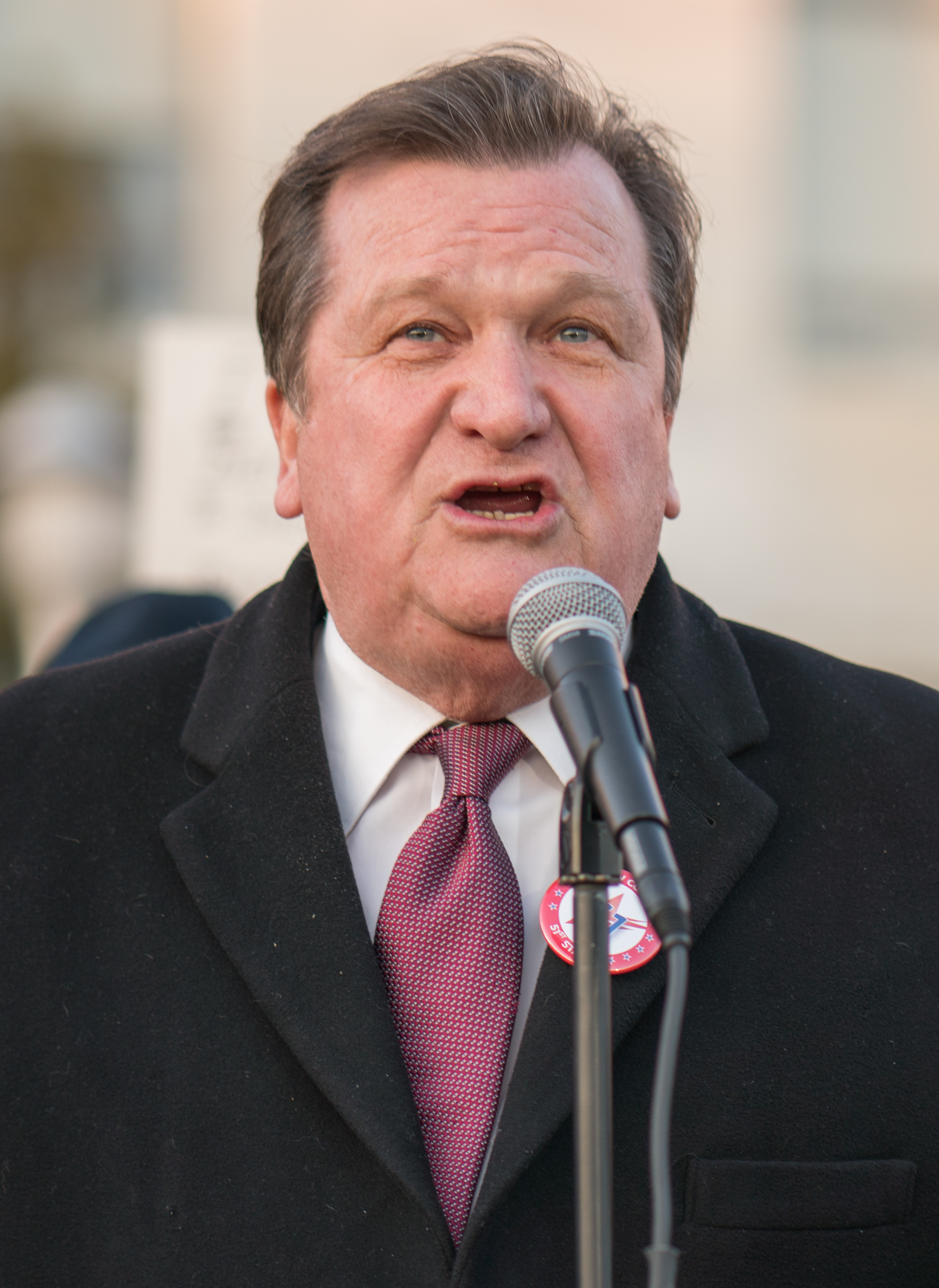

United States Shadow Senator from the District of Columbia
- In office January 3, 2007 – January 3, 2025
- Preceded by: Florence Pendleton
- Succeeded by: Ankit Jain

Personal details
- Born: Michael Donald Brown; August 5, 1953 (age 73) Newark, New Jersey, U.S.
- Party: Democratic (before 2014, 2017–present); Independent (2014–2017)
- Education: University of Maryland, College Park (BA, MPP)

Michael Donald Brown (born August 5, 1953) is an American politician who served as the junior United States shadow senator from the District of Columbia from 2007 to 2025.

As a shadow senator, Brown received no pay from the government, receives no budget from the government, and could not vote on matters before the Senate. While he did not have an office in the United States Capitol or any of the Senate's office buildings, the district's government provides the position with an office in the John A. Wilson Building. Brown lobbied the United States Senate and the United States House of Representatives on behalf of the citizens of the district in their attempt to gain full representation in Congress, self-determination, and eventually admittance to the Union as a state. As shadow senator, Brown also works with the district's delegate, mayor, and council to advance the interest of local residents on federal issues. Brown was a member of the Democratic Party, until he changed his party registration to independent in 2014. He re-joined the Democratic Party in 2017.

Brown is known colloquially as "white Mike" to distinguish him from Michael A. Brown, another Washington, D.C. politician who shares the same name. Brown's opponent in one race suggested that some Washingtonians might be voting for Michael D. Brown thinking they were voting for Michael A. Brown; Michael D. Brown strenuously denied this possibility.

== Positions ==
In 2018, Brown became irate that his delegation was not included in the D.C. Council's financing bill. After yelling and disrupting the proceedings, Brown quieted down after he was told that he would be forcibly removed from the premises.

== 2006 election ==
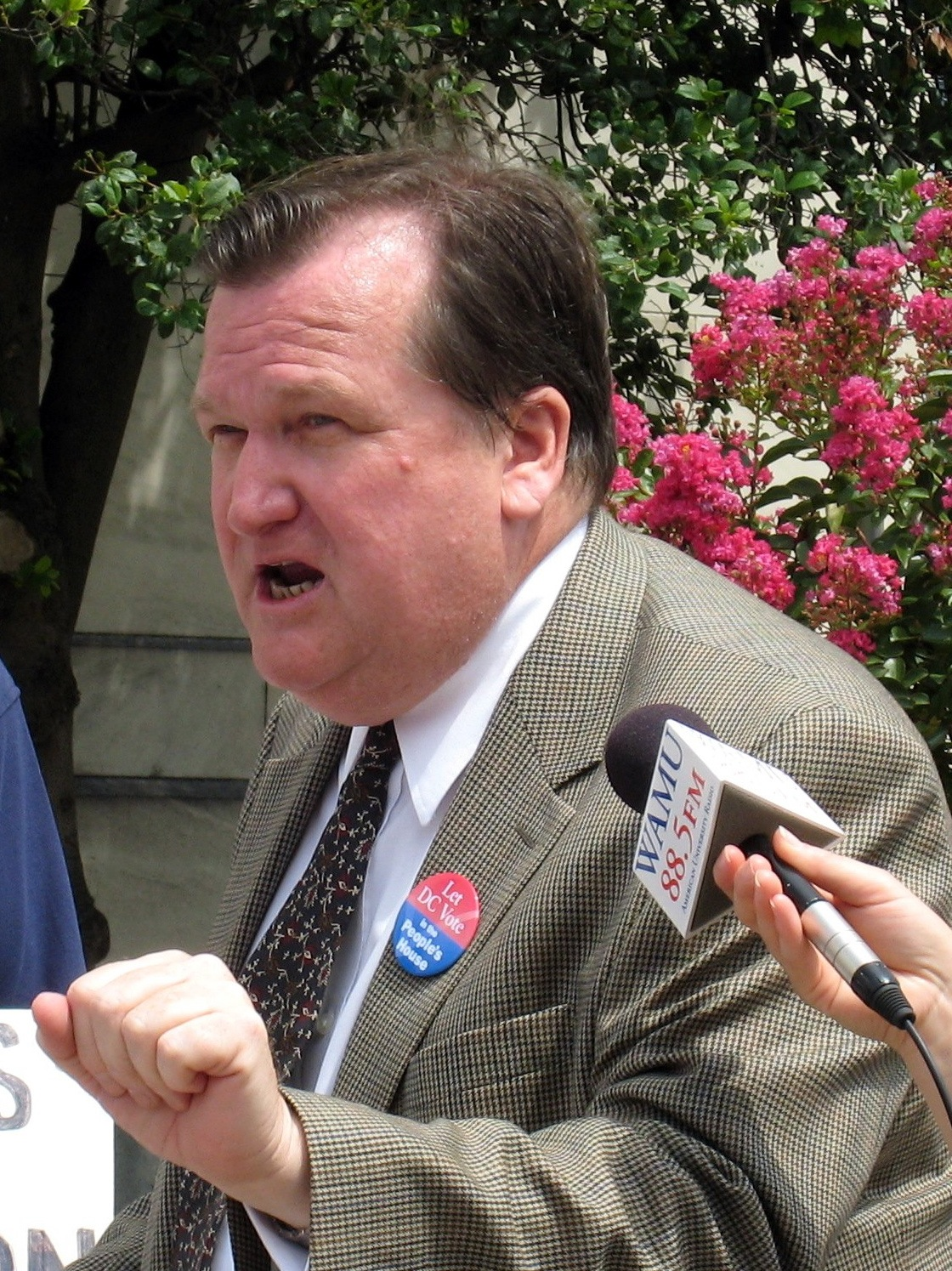
Brown in 2007

Brown ran for the position of shadow senator in 2006, using campaign posters with the slogan "the last Shadow Senator you'll ever need" and registering the domain name "shadowsenator.com" for his website. Brown opposed a bill to give the district a full representative in the House of Representatives because it did not make the district a state. In the Democratic primary in September, he received 73 percent of the vote, defeating his opponent, Ward 8 activist Philip Pannell. Incumbent shadow senator Florence Pendleton was not on the primary ballot after Pannell challenged her nominating ballots. Of her required 2,000 ballots, only 1,559 were found to be valid. She campaigned as a write-in, but received only 2 percent of the vote. Pannell blamed his loss at least partly on voter confusion, since the better-known Michael A. Brown was running for mayor at the same time; others, including Michael A. Brown himself, agreed.

In the November general election, Brown received 86 percent of the votes, while Joyce Robinson-Paul, a member of the D.C. Statehood Green Party, received 14 percent. There was no Republican candidate running for the position.

== 2010 election ==
Brown was a candidate for at-large member of the Council of the District of Columbia. Other Democrats running for the same position included Clark Ray and incumbent Phil Mendelson, who was comfortably re-elected. Concerned that many voters would confuse which Michael Brown was on the ballot, Mendelson sent out mailers with pictures of both politicians.

== 2012 election ==
Brown sought reelection to his position as shadow senator in 2012. He had the endorsements of district progressive organizations and local Democratic party groups. Brown was challenged by a wealthy district landlord Peter A. Ross who self-funded his campaign and outspent Brown by a more than 200:1 ratio. Ross's campaign had to overcome news reports noting a past conviction for federal tax fraud and reports that he failed to pay his district real estate taxes. Brown won reelection.

== 2018 election ==
Brown faced a competitive primary challenge from Andria Thomas, defeating her by 51% to 47.3%. He was re-elected in the general election with 88.2% of the vote.

== Electoral history ==
=== 2006 ===
2006 U.S. Shadow Senator election in D.C.
Primary election
Party	Candidate	Votes	%
Democratic	Michael D. Brown	62,415	73.15
Democratic	Philip Pannell	21,552	25.26
Write-in		1,363	1.60
Total votes		85,330	100.00
General election
Democratic	Michael D. Brown	90,336	84.16
DC Statehood Green	Joyce Robinson-Paul	15,352	14.30
Write-in		1,647	1.53
Total votes		107,335	100.00
Democratic hold			

=== 2012 ===
2012 U.S. Shadow Senator election in D.C.
Primary election
Party	Candidate	Votes	%
Democratic	Michael D. Brown (incumbent)	34,342	69.74
Democratic	Pete Ross	14,568	29.16
Write-in		1,046	2.09
Total votes		49,956	100.00
General election
Democratic	Michael D. Brown (incumbent)	206,911	79.78
DC Statehood Green	David Schwartzman	26,614	10.26
Republican	Nelson F. Rimensnyder	23,935	9.23
Write-in		1,896	0.73
Total votes		259,356	100.00
Democratic hold			

=== 2018 ===
2018 U.S. Shadow Senator election in D.C.
Primary election
Party	Candidate	Votes	%
Democratic	Michael D. Brown (incumbent)	35,254	51.16
Democratic	Andria Thomas	32,500	47.17
Write-in		1,151	1.67
Total votes		68,905	100.00
General election
Democratic	Michael D. Brown (incumbent)	178,573	82.89
DC Statehood Green	Eleanor Ory	33,016	15.32
Write-in		3,852	1.79
Total votes		215,441	100.00
Democratic hold			

== Personal life ==
Brown was born in Newark, New Jersey, and moved to Montgomery County, Maryland, as a teenager. Brown received a bachelor's degree and a master's degree in public policy from the University of Maryland. Brown has lived in the district since 1984, and he currently lives in the neighborhood of American University Park. Brown is also the president and founder of Horizon Communications Corp., which provides direct-mail services to political organizations and non-profit organizations. He is a member of the Saint David's Episcopal Church.

== Race for DC Council ==
In 2014, Brown ran as an independent for a seat on the Council of the District of Columbia as an at-large member. He finished 3rd, but the top two finishers won the seats.

2014 General Election, Council of the District of Columbia, At-Large Seats
Party	Candidate	Votes	%
Democratic	Anita Bonds	85,575	24.12
Independent	Elissa Silverman	41,300	11.64
Independent	Michael D. Brown	28,614	8.07
Independent	Robert White	22,198	6.26
Independent	Courtney R. Snowden	19,551	5.51
DC Statehood Green	Eugene Puryear	12,525	3.53
Independent	Graylan Scott Hagler	10,539	2.97
Independent	Khalid Pitts	10,392	2.93
Republican	Marc Morgan	9,947	2.80
Independent	Brian Hart	8,933	2.52
Independent	Kishan Putta	6,135	1.73
Independent	Calvin Gurley	4,553	1.28
Independent	Eric J. Jones	4,405	1.24
Libertarian	Frederick Steiner	3,766	1.06
Independent	Wendell Felder	2,964	0.84
Write-in		1,472	0.41
Total votes		354,716	100.00

Party political offices
Preceded by Florence Pendleton	Democratic nominee for U.S. Shadow Senator from the District of Columbia (Class 1); 2006, 2012, 2018	Succeeded by Ankit Jain
U.S. Senate
Preceded by Florence Pendleton	U.S. Shadow Senator (Class 1) from the District of Columbia; 2007–2025; Served alongside: Paul Strauss	Succeeded by Ankit Jain
