= 2012 United States Shadow Senator election in the District of Columbia =

- November 6, 2012
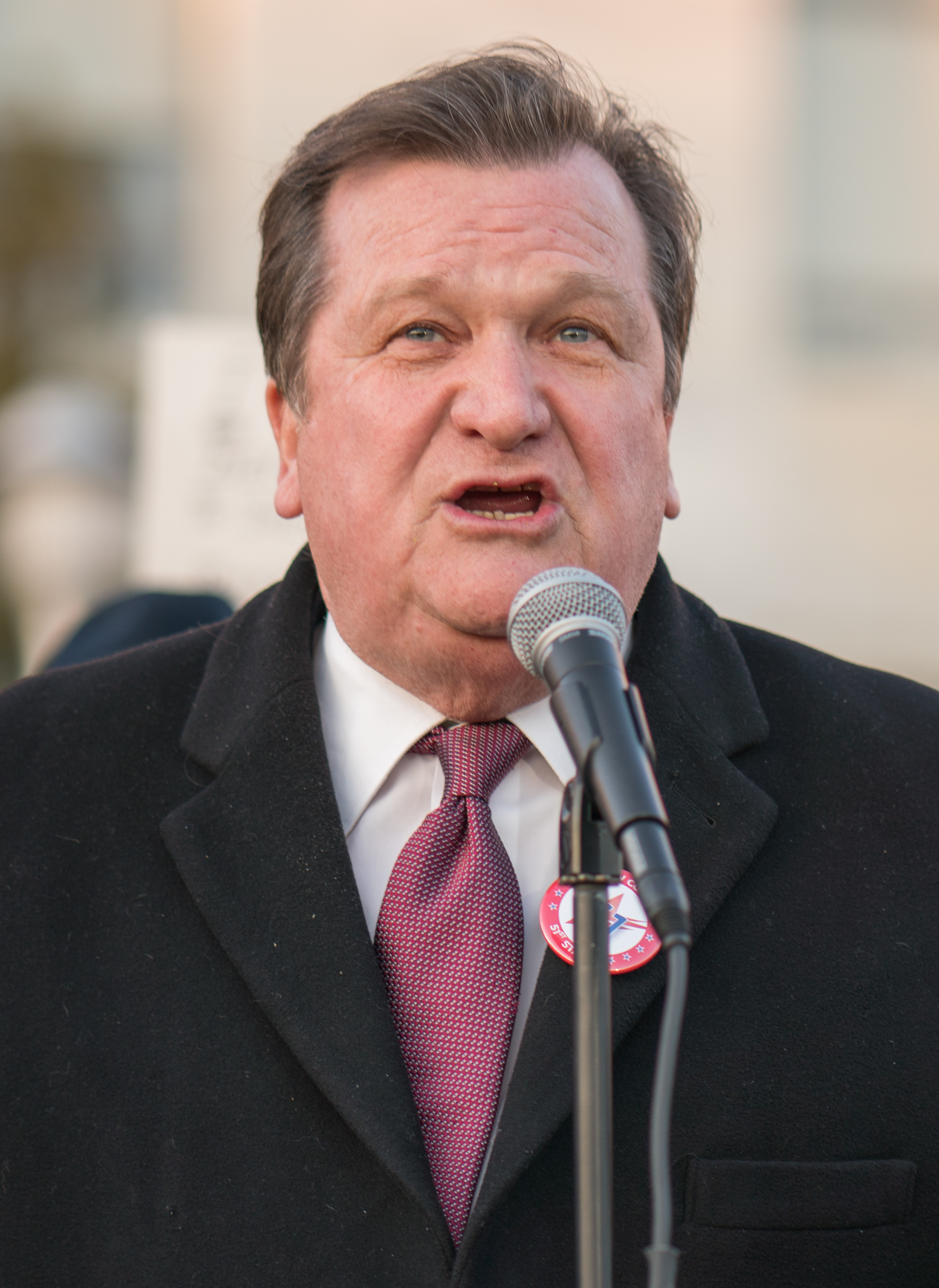

Nominee	Michael D. Brown	David Schwartzman	Nelson Nimensnyder
Party	Democratic	DC Statehood Green	Republican
Popular vote	206,911	26,614	23,935
Percentage	79.78%	10.26%	9.23%
- Brown: 40–50% 50–60% 60–70% 70–80% 80–90% >90% No votes
Shadow Senator before election
Michael D. Brown
Democratic
Elected Shadow Senator
Michael D. Brown
Democratic

The 2012 United States Shadow Senator election in the District of Columbia took place on November 6, 2012, to elect a shadow member to the United States Senate to represent the District of Columbia. The member was only recognized by the District of Columbia and not officially sworn or seated by the United States Senate. Incumbent Michael D. Brown was re-elected to a second term.

== Primary elections ==
Party primaries took place on April 3, 2012. Democrat Mike Brown, the incumbent shadow senator, won his party's primary by defeating challenger Pete Ross, and D.C. Statehood Green candidate David Schwartzman won his party's primary with a write-in campaign. Republican candidate Nelson Rimensnyder was unopposed in his party's primary.

=== Democratic primary ===
==== Candidates ====
- Michael D. Brown, incumbent Shadow Senator
- Pete Ross, furniture businessman and candidate for Shadow Senator in 2002

==== Campaign ====
Ross' campaign was largely self-funded. He gave over $200,000 of his own money to his campaign. This was a stark contrast to incumbent Senator Brown, who loaned his campaign only $1,200 with the rest of his much smaller budget composed of small donations from city residents. Brown derisively referred to Ross' warchest as "[a] felons riches"

In December 2011, four months prior to the primary election, Ross was one of four people arrested for blocking traffic on Constitution Avenue during a demonstration for statehood. On March 13, 2012, just a month before the primary, Ross went to court for sentencing and appeared before Judge Elizabeth Wingo. During his hearing, Ross requested to be given jail time instead of the probation usually given to people facing similar charges. Faced with an unusual situation, Wingo postponed judgement for two days. Before the second hearing on March 15, Wingo was called by Brown, who warned the judge that Ross was using his time in court and request for jail time as a political statement. Wingo informed Brown that his call was inappropriate and proceeded to hand the case off to another judge.

On the 15th, Ross appeared before Judge Fredrick J. Sullivan. A government prosecutor present said he opposed giving jail time yet Ross continued to ask for jail time. Sullivan attempted to dissuade Ross from going to jail and at one point said “It’s not a pleasant place over there,” Ross was unswayed and was ultimately sentenced to one day in jail and a $50 fine. Ross spent six hours in jail and was released at 10:00 pm. Though arrests of pro-statehood protesters are common in DC, Ross is the only person known to be jailed for protesting in favor of statehood.

During the campaign, several major revelations of financial wrongdoing came out. It emerged that in 2007, Pete Ross had failed to remit $203,000 in payroll taxes which led to an IRS investigation. Ross hid assets from the IRS and eventually pleaded guilty to a felony tax evasion charge. As a result he spent 90 days in a halfway house. On this issue, Senator Brown said "I’m all about redemption, too, but a guy with this kind of record can’t go up to Capitol Hill" Additionally, it was revealed that Ross owed $441,734 in unpaid sales tax, interest, and penalties to the DC government.

==== Results ====
Democratic primary results by ward: Brown—50–60% Brown—60–70% Brown—70–90%

Democratic primary results
Party	Candidate	Votes	%
Democratic	Michael D. Brown	34,342	68.74
Democratic	Pete Ross	14,568	29.16
Democratic	Write-ins	1,046	2.09
Total votes		49,956	100.0

== General election ==
The general election took place on November 6, 2012.

=== Candidates ===
- Michael D. Brown (Democratic), incumbent
- David Schwartzman (D.C. Statehood Green)
- Nelson Rimensnyder (Republican)

=== Results ===
General election results
Party	Candidate	Votes	%	±%
Democratic	Michael D. Brown (Incumbent)	206,911	79.78%	−4.38
DC Statehood Green	David Schwartzman	26,614	10.26%	−4.04
Republican	Nelson Rimensnyder	23,935	9.23%	+9.23
Write-in		1,896	0.73%	-0.80
Total votes		259,356	100.0%	
Democratic hold				
