= List of Green politicians who have held office in the United States =

Green Party of the US elected officials

This is a list of politicians endorsed by the Green Party of the United States (GPUS) who have held elected office.

GPUS publishes a semi-annual list of Greens in elected office and an annual list of Green elections & winners by year.

As of the November 2024 elections, at least 161 Greens hold elected office. In 2024, Greens won 50 of 92 (54.3%) local races and 0 of 92 (0%) state & federal races. Since 1985, Greens have won 1582 elections.

Politicians below highlighted in green were elected as a Green on a Green ticket or as an open Green in a nonpartisan election.

== Federal officials ==
As of 2024, no officials identifying as Green have held federal office.

== State officials ==
As of 2026, nine Greens have held state-level office. Three were elected as Greens. Two ran as Greens for ballot access reasons, then switched to the Democrats. Four switched parties while in office.

As of 2026, one Green politician has been elected to hold state-level office.

=== Lower houses ===
==== Current (1) ====
Name	District	State	Office	Term start	Term end	Note	Ref.
Pāʻele Kiakona	14th District	Hawaii	Hawaii House of Representatives	November 3, 2026		elected as Green; becomes the state's first third-party politician, after defeating Republican incumbent Elle Cochran and Democratic nominee Sne Patel in the 2026 election.	

==== Former (9) ====
Name	District	State	Office	Term start	Term end	Note	Ref.
Shane Robinson	39th District	Maryland	House	January 12, 2011	January 9, 2019	originally elected as Democrat, never won election as Green (Note: Robinson was elected as a member of the Democratic Party. After losing election, on November 21, 2018, Robinson joined the Maryland Green Party.)	
Henry Bear	144th District (Houlton Band of Maliseet Indians)	Maine	House	January 3, 2013	January 3, 2019	originally elected as Democrat, never won election as Green (Note: Bear was elected as a member of the Democratic Party. In November 2017, Bear joined the Maine Green Independent Party.)	
Ralph Chapman	133rd District (Note: Chapman represented the 37th District from 2010-2014.)	Maine	House	December 1, 2010	January 3, 2019	originally elected as Democrat, never won election as Green (Note: Chapman was elected as a member of the Democratic Party. On May 26, 2017, Chapman became an independent. On September 22, 2017, Chapman joined the Maine Green Independent Party.)	
Fred Smith	50th District (Note: Smith represented the 54th District in 2011.)	Arkansas	House	January 14, 2013; January 10, 2011	January 12, 2015; September 12, 2011	expelled from Democrats, ran as Green, then rejoined Democrats (Note: Smith was elected as a member of the Democratic Party, then barred from public office after conviction of felony theft. After Smith's conviction was expunged, the Democratic Party refused to run him, but he won election in 2012 on the Green Party ballot. Smith re-registered as a Democrat in 2014.)	
Ben Chipman	40th District	Maine	House	January 3, 2011	January 3, 2017	former Maine Green Party leader, elected as "unenrolled", won re-election in 2012 and 2014, then switched to Democrat and served in the Maine Senate	
Richard Carroll	39th District	Arkansas	House	January 12, 2009	January 10, 2011	elected as Green, for ballot access purposes, then joined Democrats (Note: Carroll reached out to both the Green and Democratic party. The Democratic Party could not allow Carroll to run on its ballot line, because its candidate Dwayne Dobbins was disqualified. Carroll was elected as a Green Party of Arkansas member in 2008, but switched parties to become a Democrat five months after his election.)	
John Eder	118th District	Maine	House	January 3, 2003	January 3, 2007	elected as Green	
Matt Ahearn	38th District	New Jersey	General Assembly	January 8, 2002	January 13, 2004	originally elected as Democrat, never won election as Green (Note: Ahearn was elected as a Democratic Party member in 2002 but joined the Green in 2003 after a falling-out with Democratic leadership. He lost re-election.)	
Audie Bock	16th District	California	State Assembly	April 5, 1999	November 30, 2000	elected as Green, then switched to Independent (Note: Bock was elected as a Green Party of California member to the California State Assembly in 1999, but switched her registration to Independent seven months later and ran as such in the 2000 election.)	

Jim Lendall was a Democratic Arkansas House Representative from 1998–2004, who switched to Green in 2005.

== Local officials ==
As of December 31, 2024, 39 Greens have been elected to local mayor-level positions and 36 have been appointed in cities where the mayor is appointed from within the city council or assumes the position by rotation.

Gayle McLaughlin, founding member of the Richmond Progressive Alliance, was twice elected mayor of Richmond, California, defeating two Democrats in 2006, and reelected in 2010, and elected to City Council in 2014 after completing her second term as mayor. With a population of over 100,000 people, it was the largest US city with a Green mayor.

Greens have held city council majorities in 11 cities, including Fairfax, California; Arcata, California; Sebastopol, California; and New Paltz, New York.

In 2016, the majority of local electeds were in California, several in Illinois, Connecticut, Maine, Massachusetts, Oregon, Pennsylvania, and Wisconsin, with five or fewer in ten other states. These included one mayor and one deputy mayor and fourteen county or city commissioners (or equivalent). The remainder were members of school boards, clerks and other local administrative bodies and positions.

=== Mayors ===
==== Current (4) ====
Name	Area	State	Office	Term start	Term end	Notes	Ref.
Michael Bagdes-Canning	Cherry Valley	Pennsylvania	Mayor	July 11, 2023	November 2027	elected as Green	
Peter Schwartzman	Galesburg	Illinois	Mayor	June 4, 2021	July 4, 2029	non-partisan election, marked Independent	
Bruce Delgado	Marina	California	Mayor	January 17, 2008	September 11, 2026	nonpartisan election	
Betsy Orndoff-Sayers	Wardensville	West Virginia	Mayor	July, 2018	November 2027	re-elected without official opposition in 2022 as Green, later switched party to Democratic	

==== Former (8) ====
Name	Area	Office	Notes	Ref.
John Reed	Fairfax, California	Mayor	nonpartisan election	
Mike Feinstein	Santa Monica, California	Mayor	nonpartisan election	
David Doonan	Greenwich, New York	Mayor	nonpartisan election	
Kelley Weaverling	Cordova, Alaska	Mayor	nonpartisan election	
Robb Davis	Davis, California	Mayor	nonpartisan election	
Peter Gleichman	Ward, Colorado	Mayor	nonpartisan election	
Jim Sullivan	Victory, New York	Mayor	nonpartisan election	
Jason West	New Paltz, New York	Mayor	nonpartisan election	

=== City and county councils ===
==== Current (5) ====
Name	Area	Office	Ref.
Sylvia R. Chavez	Calipatria, California	City Council	
Bob Gifford	Portage County, Wisconsin	Board of Supervisors	
Daniel Welsh	Lewisboro, New York	Town Council	
Heidi Weigleitner	Dane County, Wisconsin	Board of Supervisors	
Stephen Zollman	Sebastopol, California	City Council	

==== Former (39) ====
Name	Area	Office	Ref.
Peter Schwartzman	Galesburg, Illinois	City Council	
George Altgelt	Laredo, Texas	City Council	
Michael Beilstein	Corvallis, Oregon	City Council	
Bruce Delgado	Marina, California	City Council	
Jessica Bradshaw	Carbondale, Illinois	City Council	
David Conley	Douglas County, Wisconsin	Board of Supervisors	
Michael Cornell	River Hill Village	Board of Directors	
Josiah Dean	Dufur, Oregon	City Council	
Jennifer Dotson	Ithaca, New York	Common Council	
Becky Elder	Manitou Springs, Colorado	City Council	
Kathleen Fitzpatrick	Mosier, Oregon	City Council	
Gail Garrett	Mount Washington, Massachusetts	Board of Selectmen	
Renée Goddard	Fairfax, California	City Council	
Matt Gonzalez	San Francisco, California	President of Board of Supervisors	
Cam Gordon	Minneapolis, Minnesota	City Council	
Art Goodtimes	San Miguel County, Colorado	County Commissioner	
David Grover	Trinidad, California	City Council	
Daniel Hamburg	Mendocino County, California	Board of Supervisors	
Michelle Haynes	Norwood, Colorado	Town Board	
Gary Hull	Sharpsburg, Maryland	Town Council	
Tanya Ishikawa	Federal Heights, Colorado	City Council	
Damon Jespersen	Newbury, Massachusetts	Board of Selectmen	
John Keener	Pacifica, California	City Council	
Brian Kehoe	Catskill, New York	Village Council	
Rebecca Kemble	Madison, Wisconsin	Common Council	
Jason Kirkpatrick	Arcata, California	City Council and Vice Mayor	
Mary Jo Long	Afton, New York	Town Council	
Tom Mair	Grand Traverse County, Michigan	Board of Commissioners	
Sarah Marsh	Fayetteville, Arkansas	City Council	
Merrily Mazza	Lafayette, Colorado	City Council	
Gayle McLaughlin	Richmond, California	City Council, then Mayor twice, then City Council	
Ross Mirkarimi	San Francisco, California	Board of Supervisors, then Sheriff	
Leland Pan	Dane County, Wisconsin	Board of Supervisors	
Paul Pitino	Arcata, California	Town Council	
Marsha A. Rummel	Madison, Wisconsin	Common Council	
Dona Spring	Berkeley, California	City Council	
George P. Steeves	Southbridge, Massachusetts	Town Council	
Anna Trevorrow	Portland, Maine	City Council	
Chuck Turner	Boston, Massachusetts	City Council	

In 2005, Ross Mirkarimi, a founding member of the Green Party of California, won election to the San Francisco Board of Supervisors on the Democratic ballot line.

=== Other local officials ===
The Green Party has many local elected officials. This section notes only those who are notable or verified by a reliable source.

==== Current ====
Name	Area	Office	Ref.
Carl D'Amato	Waterford, Connecticut	Representative Town Meeting	
Andrew Frascarelli	Waterford, Connecticut	Representative Town Meeting	
Joshua Steele Kelly	Waterford, Connecticut	Representative Town Meeting (Note: Kelly was formerly elected as a Zoning Board of Appeals Alternate)	
Vincent O'Connor	Amherst, Massachusetts	Representative Town Meeting	
Darcy Van Ness	Waterford, Connecticut	Zoning Board of Appeals Alternate	
Baird Welch-Collins	Waterford, Connecticut	Representative Town Meeting	
Kenneth Mejia	Los Angeles, California	Los Angeles City Controller	

==== Former ====
Name	Area	Office	Ref.
Hector Lopez	New Canaan, Connecticut	Constable	
Rebecca Rotzler	New Paltz, New York	Deputy Mayor	
Jill Stein	Lexington, Massachusetts	Representative Town Meeting (Note: Stein would also run as the Green Party candidate for president in 2012, 2016, and 2024)	

=== Legislative caucuses ===
With exception to state legislatures and major city councils, all other legislative bodies included in the following chronological table had/have more than two affiliated members simultaneously serving in office.

Years	Government position	Jurisdiction	State	Notes
2001–2022	Minority (1/13 seats); 2001–2005: (2/13 seats)	Minneapolis City Council	Minnesota	
2018–2019	Minority (1/141 seats)	Maryland House of Delegates	Maryland	
2017–2018	Minority (2/154* seats) (Note: Includes the three non-voting elected members to the Maine House of Representatives. Henry John Bear, a non-voting member, joined the Green Party along with Representative Ralph Chapman.)	Maine House of Representatives	Maine	
2002–2006	Minority (1/151 seats)	Maine House of Representatives	Maine	
2016–2017	Minority (2/5 seats)	Anoka Water Conservation District	Minnesota	
2013–2015	Minority (1/100 seats)	Arkansas House of Representatives	Arkansas	
2008–2009	Minority (1/100 seats)	Arkansas House of Representatives	Arkansas	
2002–2014	Minority; Fluctuated (3–4 out of 9 seats)	Berkeley Rent Stabilization Board	California	
2009–2013	Majority (3/5 seats)	Fairfax Town Council	California	
2004–2008	Minority (2/5 seats)	Fairfax Town Council	California	
1990–2012	Minority; Fluctuated (2–5 out of 30 seats)	Douglas County Board of Supervisors	Wisconsin	
2001–2009	Minority; Fluctuated (2–4 out of 20 seats)	Madison Common Council	Wisconsin	
1998–2008	Minority; Fluctuated (2–4 out of 39 seats)	Dane County Board of Supervisors	Wisconsin	
2004–2008	Minority; Fluctuated (3–4 out of 29 seats)	Portage County Board of Supervisors	Wisconsin	
2000–2008	Majority (3/5 seats)	Sebastopol City Council	California	
2004–2007	Minority; Fluctuated (2–4 out of 9 seats)	Portland Board of Education	Maine	
2003–2007	Minority (2/7 seats)	Kalamazoo City Commission	Michigan	
2004–2006; 1996–1998	Majority (3/5 seats)	Arcata City Council	California	
2002–2004; 1998–2000	Minority (2/5 seats)	Arcata City Council	California	
2002–2006	Majority (3/5 seats)	School Board of Twin Ridges Elementary	California	
2003–2004	Majority (3/5 seats)	New Paltz Village Council	New York	
2002–2004	Minority (1/80 seats)	New Jersey General Assembly	New Jersey	
1998–2004	Minority (2/7 seats)	Santa Monica City Council	California	
2001–2003	Minority (2/30 seats)	New Haven Board of Aldermen	Connecticut	
2000–2002	Minority (2/8 seats)	Salem City Council	Oregon	
2000–2002	Minority (2/8 seats)	Santa Fe City Council	New Mexico	
1995–2002	Minority (2/5 seats)	Point Arena Town Council	California	
1999	Minority (1/80 seats)	California State Assembly	California	
1996–1998	Minority (2/8 seats)	Fayetteville City Council	Arkansas	

== See also ==
- Green Party of the United States articles:
  - Electoral history of the Green Party of the United States
  - History of the Green Party of the United States
- Other lists:
  - List of socialist members of the United States Congress
  - List of elected socialist mayors in the United States
  - List of Democratic Socialists of America public officeholders
  - List of Communist Party USA members who have held office in the United States
- Kyrsten Sinema, a former Green elected to the U.S. Senate as a Democrat
- Daniel Hamburg, a future Green elected to the U.S. House of representatives as a Democrat
- Cynthia McKinney, a future Green elected to the U.S. House of representatives as a Democrat
