= List of socialist mayors in the United States =

The following is a list of mayors who have declared themselves to be socialists or have been a member of a socialist party in the United States.

== Statistics ==
In 1911, one author estimated that there were twenty-eight such mayors and in 1913 another author estimated thirty-four. In 1967, however, James Weinstein's table of "Cities and Towns Electing Socialist Mayors or Other Major Municipal Officers, 1911–1920" counted 74 such municipalities in 1911 and 32 in 1913, with smaller peaks in 1915 (22) and 1917 (18):

U.S. towns electing Socialist mayors or major officers, 1911–1920
Year	No.	Year	No.	Year	No.	Year	No.	Year	No.
1911	74	1913	32	1915	22	1917	18	1919	5
1912	8	1914	5	1916	6	1918	2	1920	2
Total	82	Total	37	Total	28	Total	20	Total	7

In 1911, the SPA won election to about 1,141 local offices in total.

== List of mayors ==
Mayor	Term start	Term end	City	State	Party
Kenneth Zuniga	2026 (elect)	Elect	Vista	California	Democratic Party (DSA member)
David Morales	2027 (elect)	Elect	Providence	Rhode Island	Democratic Party (DSA member)
Nithya Raman	2027 (elect)	Elect	Los Angeles	California	Democratic Party (DSA member)
Janeese Lewis George	2027 (elect)	Elect	Washington	District of Columbia	Democratic Party (DSA member)
Yousef Rabhi	2026 (elect)	Elect	Ann Arbor	Michigan	Democratic Party (DSA member)
Katie Wilson	2026	Current	Seattle	Washington	Democratic Party, self-described socialist
Zohran Mamdani	2026	Current	New York	New York	Fusion candidate: Democratic Party and Working Families Party (DSA member; former New York State Socialists in Office member)
Larry Agran	2025	Current	Irvine	California	Democratic Party (DSA member)
Emma Mulvaney-Stanak	2024	Current	Burlington	Vermont	Vermont Progressive Party (DSA member)
Sara Innamorato (Note: Innamorato is a county executive, not a mayor proper.)	2024	Current	Allegheny County	Pennsylvania	Democratic Party (DSA member, now former)
Brian Nowak (Note: Nowak is a town supervisor, not a mayor proper.)	2023	Current	Cheektowaga	New York	Democratic Party (DSA member)
Eduardo Martinez	2023	Current	Richmond	California	Democratic Party (DSA member and Richmond Progressive Alliance member)
Elizabeth Alcantar	2022	2022	Cudahy	California	Democratic Party (DSA member)
khalid kamau (Note: kamau uses lowercase letters for his names.)	2022	2025	South Fulton	Georgia	Democratic Party (DSA member)
Marc Elrich (Note: Elrich is a county executive, not a mayor proper.)	2018	Current	Montgomery County	Maryland	Democratic Party (DSA member)
James H. Coleman	2023	2024	South San Francisco	California	Democratic Party (DSA member)
Konstantine Anthony	2022	2023	Burbank	California	Democratic Party (DSA member)
Anne Watson	2018	2023	Montpelier	Vermont	Fusion candidate: Vermont Progressive Party and Democratic Party
Chokwe Antar Lumumba (Note: Son of the previous socialist mayor, Chokwe Lumumba)	2017	2025	Jackson	Mississippi	Democratic Party, self-described socialist
Ethan Strimling	2015	2019	Portland	Maine	Democratic Party (DSA member)
Chokwe Lumumba	2013	2014	Jackson	Mississippi	Democratic Party, self-described socialist
Ron Dellums	2007	2011	Oakland	California	Democratic Party (DSA member)
Bob Kiss	2006	2012	Burlington	Vermont	Vermont Progressive Party
Peter Clavelle	1995	2006	Burlington	Vermont	Vermont Progressive Party (1995-2004), then Democratic Party (2004-2006) (Note: Clavelle became a member of the Democratic Party in 2004.)
James Scheibel	1990	1994	Saint Paul	Minnesota	Democratic Party (DSA member)
David Dinkins	1990	1993	New York	New York	Democratic Party (DSA member)
Peter Clavelle	1989	1993	Burlington	Vermont	Vermont Progressive Party
Benjamin Nichols	1989	1995	Ithaca	New York	Democratic Party (DSA member)
Bernie Sanders	1981	1989	Burlington	Vermont	Independent
Gus Newport	1979	1986	Berkeley	California	Berkeley Citizens Action (DSA member)
David Belgum	1976	1987	University Heights	Iowa	Socialist Party of America
Frank P. Zeidler	1948	1960	Milwaukee	Wisconsin	Socialist Party of America
Irving Freese	1947	1951	Norwalk	Connecticut	Socialist Party of America
J. Henry Stump	1943	1947	Reading	Pennsylvania	Socialist Party of America
J. Henry Stump	1935	1939	Reading	Pennsylvania	Socialist Party of America
Fiorello La Guardia	1934	1946	New York	New York	Republican Party, self-described socialist
C. Henry Bloom	1933	1953	Rockford	Illinois	Rockford Progressive Party (Note: Bloom ran for the Rockford Progressive Party, which was formed by dissidents of the Rockford Labor Party in 1929.)
Jasper McLevy	1933	1957	Bridgeport	Connecticut	Socialist Party of America
William Swoboda	1931	1932	Racine	Wisconsin	Socialist Party of America
Fred W. Suitor	1929	1931	Barre	Vermont	Socialist Party of America
J. Henry Stump	1927	1931	Reading	Pennsylvania	Socialist Party of America
Robert A. Bakeman	1925	1929	Peabody	Massachusetts	Socialist Party of America (non-partisan)
James B. Furber	1922	1924	Rahway	New Jersey	Socialist Party of America
J. Herman Hallstrom	1921	1933	Rockford	Illinois	Rockford Labor Legion (1921–29), then Independent (1929-33) (Note: Hallstrom ran for the Rockford Labor Legion from 1921–1927, in 1929 the Labor Party refused to nominate him on the grounds that he had moved from some of the party's principles. He ran as an independent from 1929-33. The Rockford Labor Legion was a coalition of local trade unions, socialist organizations and temperance societies.)
C.L. Barewald	1920	1922	Davenport	Iowa	Socialist Party of America (Note: Barewald resigned from the Socialist Party during the first week of January 1921 and captured national headlines by declaring radicals "insane" and instructing local police to greet unwanted members of the Industrial Workers of the World with "hot lead." See: "Wants Town Rid of IWW: Mayor Barewald Advises Use of Riot Guns," Eugene Morning Register, Jan. 9, 1921, pg. 1.)
Parkman B. Flanders	1920	1923	Haverhill	Massachusetts	Socialist Party of America
John H. Gibbons	1920	1922	Lackawanna	New York	Socialist Party of America
Frank B. Hamilton	1918		Piqua	Ohio	Socialist Party of America
Major Church	1918	1921	Eureka	Utah	Socialist Party of America
Thomas Van Lear	1917	1919	Minneapolis	Minnesota	Socialist Party of America (1917–18), then Public Ownership Party (1918–19) (Note: Van Lear was expelled from the Socialist Party of America in 1918.)
David Love	1916		West Allis	Wisconsin	Socialist Party of America
Daniel Webster Hoan	1916	1940	Milwaukee	Wisconsin	Socialist Party of America
Robert Gordon	1916	1917	Barre	Vermont	Socialist Party of America
Ernst Gottfrid Strand	1916	1917	Two Harbors	Minnesota	Socialist Party of America
George R. Lunn	1915	1917	Schenectady	New York	Socialist Party of America
Henry M. Schutte	1915		Adamston	West Virginia	Socialist Party of America
Elijah Falk	1915	1919	Eureka	California	Socialist Party of America
Eugene Bootz	1914	1915	Edgewater	Colorado	Socialist Party of America
James Love	1914	1916	Lake Worth	Florida	Socialist Party of America
A. W. Vincent	1914	1915	St. Johns	Oregon	Socialist Party of America
A. Barton Cross	1913	1914	Naugatuck	Connecticut	Socialist Party of America
Seth Wood	1913	1914	Lafayette	Colorado	Socialist Party of America
William Towl	1912* (Note: Listed as being currently in office as of May 1913 per source.)		Two Harbors	Minnesota	Socialist Party of America
William Breese	1912*		Talent	Oregon	Socialist Party of America
John C. Knapp	1912*		Sisseton	South Dakota	Socialist Party of America
E. S. Dale	1912*		Rugby	North Dakota	Socialist Party of America
W. A. Matthews	1912*		Rockaway	New Jersey	Socialist Party of America
L. S. McKinney	1912*		Mineral City	Ohio	Socialist Party of America
Newton Wycoff	1912*		Martins Ferry	Ohio	Socialist Party of America
N. J. Hansen	1912*		Mammoth	Utah	Socialist Party of America
M. M. Jones	1912*		Liberal	Missouri	Socialist Party of America
S. R. Wood	1912*		Lafayette	Colorado	Socialist Party of America
Jared Herdlich	1912*		Hillyard	Washington	Socialist Party of America
R. S. Dayton	1912*		Hendricks	West Virginia	Socialist Party of America
William Brueckmann	1912*		Haledon	New Jersey	Socialist Party of America
E. E. Wintergill	1912*		Gulfport	Florida	Socialist Party of America
W. M. Ralston	1912*		Fostoria	Ohio	Socialist Party of America
John A. Miller	1912*		Eagle Bend	Minnesota	Socialist Party of America
Neil Monroe	1912*		Burlington	Washington	Socialist Party of America
Homer J. Brown	1912*		Buena Vista	Colorado	Socialist Party of America
R. A. Henning	1912*		Brainerd	Minnesota	Socialist Party of America
N. L. Larson	1912	1913	Crookston	Minnesota	Socialist Party of America
Thomas M. Fluhart	1912		Linden Heights	Ohio	Socialist Party of America
J.M. Haley	1912	1916	Paonia	Colorado	Socialist Party of America
George Huscher	1912	1915	Murray	Utah	Socialist Party of America
J.F. Johnston	1912	1914	Fairhope	Alabama	Socialist Party of America
Walter V. Tyler	1912	1915	New Castle	Pennsylvania	Socialist Party of America
George Urie	1912	1913	Cedar City	Utah	Socialist Party of America
Joseph Warnock	1912		Harbor Springs	Michigan	Socialist Party of America
Scott Wilkins	1912	1913	St. Marys	Ohio	Socialist Party of America
Thomas W. Pape	1912		Lorain	Ohio	Socialist Party of America
Alfred A. Perrine	1912	1913	Mount Vernon	Ohio	Socialist Party of America
Corbin Shook	1912		Lima	Ohio	Socialist Party of America
Peter Stewart	1912	1914	Hartford	Arkansas	Socialist Party of America
B. C. Ross	1912	1916	Daly City	California	Socialist Party of America
George R. Lunn	1911	1913	Schenectady	New York	Socialist Party of America
Henry Stolze, Jr.	1911		Manitowoc	Wisconsin	Socialist Party of America
Edward Mauck	1911		Wymore	Nebraska	Socialist Party of America
John A. C. Menton	1911	1912	Flint	Michigan	Socialist Party of America
Robert Murray	1911	1915	Toronto	Ohio	Socialist Party of America
Ed E. Robinson	1911	1913	Mineral Ridge	Ohio	Socialist Party of America
William Shay	1911	1917	Star City	West Virginia	Socialist Party of America
Jackson Stitt Wilson	1911	1913	Berkeley	California	Socialist Party of America
John T. Wood	1911	1913	Coeur d'Alène	Idaho	Socialist Party of America
James Larson	1911		Marinette	Wisconsin	Socialist Party of America
M.E. Kirkpatrick	1911	1913	Granite City	Illinois	Socialist Party of America
H.P. Houghton	1911		Girard	Kansas	Socialist Party of America
W.E. Griffin	1911		Beatrice	Nebraska	Socialist Party of America
Alexander Halliday	1911		Two Harbors	Minnesota	Socialist Party of America
Edward Foe	1911		Red Cloud	Nebraska	Socialist Party of America
W. H. Cook	1911		Edmonds	Washington	Socialist Party of America
John Dobler	1912	1921	Gulfport	Florida	Socialist Party of America
Lewis J. Duncan (Note: Lewis Duncan's name is sometimes spelled Louis Duncan.)	1911	1914	Butte	Montana	Socialist Party of America
J.B. Bitterly	1911	1915	Victor	Colorado	Socialist Party of America
Albert B. Thomas	1911		Greenville	Michigan	Socialist Party of America
William Thum	1911	1913	Pasadena	California	Socialist Party of America
Emil Seidel	1910	1912	Milwaukee	Wisconsin	Socialist Party of America
Ewell Work	1910	1912	Ledford	Illinois	Socialist Party of America
Arthur LeSueur	1910	1911	Minot	North Dakota	Socialist Party of America
A. Ousdahl	1909	1910	Brainerd	Minnesota	Socialist Party of America
Thomas M. Todd	1909	1914	Grand Junction	Colorado	Socialist Party of America
Andrew Mitchell	1908		Eureka	Utah	Socialist Party of America
Daniel T. Leigh	1906	1907	Cedar City	Utah	Socialist Party of America
Brand Whitlock	1906	1912	Toledo	Ohio	Socialist Party of America
Ray Austin	1905	1906	Red Lodge	Montana	Socialist Party of America
Parkman B. Flanders	1903	1904	Haverhill	Massachusetts	Socialist Party of America
John Frinke	1903		Anaconda	Montana	Socialist Party of America
Charles A. Born	1903	1904	Sheboygan	Wisconsin	Socialist Party of America
Charles H. Coulter	1900	1901	Brockton	Massachusetts	Social Democratic Party of America (Note: Chase and Coulter were both elected mayor for the Social Democratic Party, but the party later merged itself with a dissident faction of the Socialist Labor Party in 1901 and founded the Socialist Party of America.)
John C. Chase	1898	1900	Haverhill	Massachusetts	Social Democratic Party of America

== See also ==
- Other lists:
  - List of socialist members of the United States Congress
  - List of Democratic Socialists of America public officeholders
  - List of Green politicians who have held office in the United States (none at federal level)
  - List of Communist Party USA members who have held office in the United States (none at federal level)
- History of the socialist movement in the United States
- The Squad (United States Congress)
- Congressional Progressive Caucus
- Millennial socialism
