= List of socialist members of the United States Congress =

The following is a list of members of the United States Congress who have declared themselves to be socialists or have been a member of a socialist organization in the United States.

== History ==
From the 1890s to the 1910s, most socialists who won election to public office ran on the Populist or Socialist Party of America (SPA) ballot lines. While the SPA won a few federal elections, its electoral power was much greater in local and state elections, and briefly held over 1,000 local offices. During the First Red Scare, the House of Representatives twice refused to seat socialist Victor Berger, who won re-election after being convicted of violating the Espionage Act of 1917.

During the 1920s–40s, several socialists won election to US Congress during the Great Depression as members of the New Deal coalition, including as Progressive Republicans (members of the progressive wing of the Republican Party). Very few Communist Party USA (CPUSA) members have ever won federal office, and never as professed Communists. The Second Red Scare and McCarthy era resulted in persecution of socialists, removal of socialists from unions, and weaker socialist electoral outcomes.

A small number of social-democratic and democratic socialist Democrats began to win elections to Congress after 1970. These Democrats were usually affiliated with Democratic Socialist Organizing Committee (DSOC), later the Democratic Socialists of America (DSA).

In the 2010s and 2020s, after the Bernie Sanders 2016 presidential campaign and subsequent explosion of DSA membership, the DSA rapidly gained House seats. In 2021, there were more socialists in Congress than any point in US history, most of whom are members of the DSA. In 2024, after Cori Bush and Jamaal Bowman lost re-election and Greg Casar and Summer Lee lost their DSA endorsements, that number shrank again. In 2026, five DSA members won their Democratic primaries in deep-blue districts: Chris Rabb, Claire Valdez, Darializa Avila Chevalier, Melat Kiros, and Donavan McKinney, as did democratic socialist and former DSA member Brad Lander. A sixth DSA member, Angela Gonzalez-Torres, won a top-two general election in a blue district. Another former DSA member, William Lawrence, won a purple district. As a result, socialists hold more seats in Congress than any prior point in US history.

== Senate ==
The table below lists members of the United States Senate who publicly identified as socialists or members of a socialist organization during their time in office.

As of November 3, 2026:

Senator	Ballot line	State	Term start	Term end	Note
Bernie Sanders (born 1941)	Independent (Note: Although an independent, Sanders maintains a close relationship with the Democratic Party, having caucused with House and Senate Democrats for most of his congressional career. (Note: Sanders usually wins both the Democratic Party and Vermont Progressive Party primaries, though he declines their endorsements.))	Vermont	Jan 3, 2007	Incumbent	Sanders is a democratic socialist.

== House of Representatives ==
The table below lists members of the United States House of Representatives who publicly identified as socialists or members of a socialist organization during their time in office.

As of November 3, 2026:

Representative	Ballot line	Dist	Term start	Term end	Note
Robert Dale Owen	Democratic Party	IN-1	Mar 4, 1843	Mar 3, 1847	Owen supported Owenism, a utopian socialist tendency based on the ideas of his father, Robert Owen.
Horace Greeley	Whig	NY-6	Dec 4, 1848	Mar 3, 1849	Greeley supported Fourierism in the 1840s, a utopian socialist tendency, and after 1848 shifted toward a form of liberal socialism or mutualism.
Henry Smith	Union Labor Party	WI-4	Mar 4, 1887	Mar 3, 1889	Smith was a socialist. He was elected to both the Milwaukee Common Council and the Wisconsin State Assembly on the Socialist ballot line.
George Lunn	Democratic Party	NY-30	Mar 4, 1917	Mar 4, 1919	Lunn was a Christian socialist and Social Gospel preacher. In 1911, Lunn joined the Socialist Party of America and was elected mayor of Schenectady on the Socialist ticket, where he pursued a "sewer socialist" agenda. In 1916, Lunn was elected to the House as a Democrat.
Meyer London	Socialist Party of America	NY-12	Mar 4, 1921	Mar 3, 1923	London was a socialist and a founder of the Socialist Party of America. London voted against American entry into World War I and the Espionage Act of 1917, enraging wartime patriots, while voting for war funding bills, enraging antiwar socialists (see also Internationalist–defencist schism). London, who was Jewish and represented the highly Jewish Lower East Side, opposed a Zionist resolution to support the Balfour Declaration, leading conservative rabbis to campaign against him. Against these headwinds, London lost re-election in 1918, then won election again in 1920.
Meyer London	Socialist Party of America	NY-12	Mar 4, 1915	Mar 3, 1919	
Victor Berger	Socialist Party of America	WI-5	Mar 4, 1923	Mar 3, 1929	Berger was a socialist, a founding member of the Social Democratic Party of America, and a founding member of its successor, the Socialist Party of America. Berger served his first 1911–1913 term without issue. In 1919, Berger was convicted of violating the Espionage Act of 1917 for publicizing his anti-interventionist views and was denied the seat to which he had been reelected in the House. In 1921, the criminal verdict was overturned by the Supreme Court in Berger v. United States. Berger was subsequently elected to three successive terms in the 1920s.
Victor Berger	Socialist Party of America	WI-5	Mar 4, 1919	Nov 10, 1919	
Victor Berger	Socialist Party of America	WI-5	Mar 4, 1911	Mar 3, 1913	
Vito Marcantonio	American Labor Party	NY-18	Jan 3, 1939	Jan 3, 1951	Marcantonio was a socialist, a New Deal coalition member, and a Progressive Republican, like his mentor and ally Fiorello La Guardia. In the 1940s and 1950s, he was surveilled by the FBI, who cited his affiliation with Communist-associated groups.
Vito Marcantonio	Republican Party	NY-20	Jan 3, 1935	Jan 3, 1937	Marcantonio was a socialist, a New Deal coalition member, and a Progressive Republican, like his mentor and ally Fiorello La Guardia. In the 1940s and 1950s, he was surveilled by the FBI, who cited his affiliation with Communist-associated groups.
Leo Isacson	American Labor Party	NY-24	Feb 17, 1948	Jan 3, 1949	According to a Wall Street Journal editorial, Isacson was a socialist. He worked alongside Vito Marcantonio. In April 1948, he was the first member of Congress to be denied a United States passport by the State Department, when he attempted to go to Paris to attend a conference for the American Council for a Democratic Greece, which opposed the Greek government in the Greek Civil War.
John Conyers	Democratic Party	MI-13	Jan 3, 1965	Dec 5, 2017	Conyers was a democratic socialist, a DSOC member, and a founding DSA member.
Ron Dellums	Democratic Party	CA-9	Jan 3, 1971	Feb 6, 1998	Dellums was a democratic socialist, a founding DSOC member and became vice-chair of DSA.
Bernie Sanders	Independent	VT-AL	Jan 3, 1991	Jan 3, 2007	
Rashida Tlaib	Democratic Party	MI-12	Jan 3, 2019	Incumbent	Tlaib is a democratic socialist and a DSA member.
Alexandria Ocasio-Cortez	Democratic and Working Families (fusion)	NY-14	Jan 3, 2019	Incumbent	Ocasio-Cortez is a democratic socialist and DSA member. (Note: AOC joined DSA in 2018 and remained a dues-paying member through 2019, when her dues-paying membership lapsed. Neither AOC or national DSA noticed the lapse until 2026, when AOC formally restarted her dues payments.) She was endorsed by national DSA from 2018–2024 and remains endorsed by NYC-DSA.
Jamaal Bowman	Democratic Party	NY-16	Jan 3, 2021	Jan 3, 2025	Bowman is a democratic socialist and DSA member. Bowman was endorsed by New York City DSA (NYC-DSA) over 2020-25 and national DSA over 2020-22, when national DSA un-endorsed him in a rift over Israel.
Cori Bush	Democratic Party	MO-1	Jan 3, 2021	Jan 3, 2025	Bush is a democratic socialist and DSA member. Bush was endorsed by national DSA and St. Louis DSA.
Summer Lee	Democratic Party	PA-12	Jan 3, 2023	Incumbent	Lee is a democratic socialist and former DSA member. In 2018, Lee was endorsed for a Pennsylvania House of Representatives election by national DSA and Pittsburgh DSA. Lee joined DSA in 2018, distanced herself in 2019 after a Pittsburgh DSA leadership change, and had left by 2021.

=== Incoming members ===
The following candidates won election to Congress in the 2026 elections and will be seated on January 3, 2027:

As of November 3, 2026:

Representative-elect	Ballot line	Dist	Term start	Term end	Note
Chris Rabb	Democratic Party	PA-3	Jan 3, 2027	Current	Rabb is a democratic socialist and a DSA member. Rabb was endorsed by national DSA and Philadelphia DSA.
Claire Valdez	Democratic and Working Families (fusion)	NY-7	Jan 3, 2027	Current	Valdez is a democratic socialist and a DSA member. Valdez was previously a longtime chapter leader of NYC-DSA, which later endorsed her run for congress.
Brad Lander	Democratic and Working Families (fusion)	NY-10	Jan 3, 2027	Current	Lander is a progressive and a democratic socialist. Lander was a DSA member from 1987 to 2023, when he left the group, citing the October 7 attacks.
Darializa Avila Chevalier	Democratic and Working Families (fusion)	NY-13	Jan 3, 2027	Current	Avila Chevalier is a democratic socialist and a DSA member. Avila Chevalier was endorsed by NYC-DSA.
Melat Kiros	Democratic Party	CO-1	Jan 3, 2027	Current	Kiros is a democratic socialist and a DSA member. Kiros was endorsed by national DSA and Denver DSA.
Donavan McKinney	Democratic Party	MI-13	Jan 3, 2027	Current	McKinney is a democratic socialist and a DSA member. McKinney was endorsed by national DSA and Metro Detroit DSA.
Angela Gonzalez-Torres	Democratic Party	CA-34	Jan 3, 2027	Current	Gonzales-Torres is a democratic socialist and a DSA member. Gonzales-Torres was endorsed by national DSA and Los Angeles DSA (LA-DSA).
William Lawrence	Democratic Party	MI-7	Jan 3, 2027	Current	Lawrence is a progressive and democratic socialist. Lawrence co-founded the Sunrise Movement. He was a DSA member until July 2026, and did not seek endorsement from Metro Detroit DSA.

=== House delegates (non-voting members) ===
Delegate	Ballot line	Dist	Term start	Term end	Note
Santiago Iglesias	Socialist Party	PR-AL	Mar 4, 1933	Dec 5, 1939	Iglesias was a socialist who co-founded the Socialist Party of Puerto Rico.
Bolívar Pagán	Republican Union	PR-AL	Dec 26, 1939	Jan 3, 1945	Pagán was a socialist and a member of the Socialist Party of Puerto Rico. He was appointed resident commissioner in a Socialist-Republican Union coalition.

== Members who were socialists out of office ==
The table below lists members of the United States Congress who publicly identified as socialists or members of a socialist organization at some point in their life, but not while they held Congressional office. As of August 19, 2026:

Member	Photo	Term start	Term end	Dist	Ballot line	Note
Kittel Halvorson		Mar 3, 1891	Mar 4, 1893	MN-5	People's Party	In the 1900s, Halvorson joined the Socialist Party of America.
Haldor Boen		Mar 4, 1893	Mar 3, 1895	MN-7	People's Party	In the 1900s, Boen joined the Socialist Party of America.
Freeman Knowles		Mar 4, 1897	Mar 3, 1899	SD-AL	People's Party	In the 1900s, Knowles joined the Socialist Party of America.
Homer Bone		Jan 3, 1933	Nov 13, 1944	WA-Sen	Democratic Party	Bone was a member of the Socialist Party of America until 1920; he later joined the Democratic Party.
Jerry Voorhis		Jan 3, 1937	Jan 3, 1947	CA-12	Democratic Party	Voorhis was inspired by Christian socialism and the Social Gospel tradition. He was a member of the Socialist Party of America until 1934, when he joined the Democratic Party. In 1936, Voorhis was elected as a "Progressive Roosevelt-Democrat". Voorhis was anti-communist and served on the House Un-American Activities Committee.
John Bernard		Jan 3, 1937	Jan 3, 1939	MN-8	Minnesota Farmer–Labor Party	Bernard was one of the few current, former, or future members of Congress to publicly support the Spanish Republic in the Spanish Civil War. In the 1930s and 1940s, Bernard worked alongside Communist Party USA front groups. In 1952, Bernard was subpoenaed by the House Unamerican Activities Committee (HUAC), where he asserted his loyalty to America and took his Fifth Amendment privilege. In 1977, Bernard joined Communist Party USA.
Henry Teigan		Jan 3, 1937	Jan 3, 1939	MN-3	Minnesota Farmer–Labor Party	Teigan was a member of the Socialist Party of America from 1913 to 1916. He later joined the Nonpartisan League until 1923, when he became a member of the Minnesota Farmer–Labor Party.
Hugh De Lacy		Jan 3, 1945	Jan 3, 1947	WA-1	Democratic Party	From 1937 to 1939, De Lacy led the Seattle chapter of Communist Party USA. By the time he was elected to the House in 1944, De Lacy had moderated his political views and become "once more a loyal New Dealer".
Andrew Biemiller		Jan 3, 1949	Jan 3, 1951	WI-5	Democratic Party	Biemiller was a member of the Socialist Party of America until 1935 before joining the Wisconsin Progressive Party, where he remained until 1944. He was later elected to the House as a Democrat.
Andrew Biemiller		Jan 3, 1945	Jan 3, 1947	WI-5	Democratic Party	Biemiller was a member of the Socialist Party of America until 1935 before joining the Wisconsin Progressive Party, where he remained until 1944. He was later elected to the House as a Democrat.
George M. Rhodes		Jan 3, 1949	Jan 3, 1969	PA-6	Democratic Party	Rhodes was a member of the Socialist Party of Pennsylvania. He was elected to the Socialist Party of America's National Executive Committee in 1936.
William H. Meyer		Jan 3, 1959	Jan 3, 1961	VT-AL	Democratic Party	Meyer was a progressive. In 1970, he co-founded the Liberty Union Party, a socialist political party.
Bobby Rush		Jan 3, 1993	Jan 3, 2023	IL-1	Democratic Party	Rush co-founded the Illinois chapter of the Black Panther Party in 1968, serving as the group's defense minister. He left the Black Panthers in 1974.
Barbara Lee		Apr 21, 1998	Jan 3, 2025	CA-12	Democratic Party	As a college student in 1968, Lee volunteered at the Oakland chapter of the Black Panther Party's Community Learning Center and worked on Black Panther co-founder Bobby Seale's 1973 campaign for mayor of Oakland. Lee was surveilled by the Federal Bureau of Investigation due to her Black Panther work.
Greg Casar		Jan 3, 2023	Current	TX-35	Democratic Party	Until mid-2022, Casar identified as a democratic socialist. He was a member of the Democratic Socialists of America from 2017 to 2022.

== Members with disputed ideologies ==
The table below includes members who have been described as socialist, but do not identify with the ideology.

As of August 19, 2026:

Member	Photo	Term start	Term end	Dist	Ballot line	Note
Robert M. La Follette		Jan 4, 1906	Jun 18, 1925	WI-Sen	Republican and Progressive (fusion)	La Follette was a progressive who aligned himself with socialist groups, particularly the Conference for Progressive Political Action and the Socialist Party of America, in his 1924 presidential campaign, though he did not identify as a socialist himself.
Robert M. La Follette		Mar 4, 1885	Mar 3, 1891	WI-3	Republican Party	La Follette was a progressive who aligned himself with socialist groups, particularly the Conference for Progressive Political Action and the Socialist Party of America, in his 1924 presidential campaign, though he did not identify as a socialist himself.
Smith W. Brookhart		Mar 4, 1927	Mar 3, 1933	IA-Sen	Republican Party	Brookhart was one of the few current, former, or future members of Congress to publicly support the Spanish Republic in the Spanish Civil War.
Smith W. Brookhart		Nov 8, 1922	Apr 12, 1926	IA-Sen	Republican Party	Brookhart was one of the few current, former, or future members of Congress to publicly support the Spanish Republic in the Spanish Civil War.
Fiorello La Guardia		Mar 4, 1927	Mar 3, 1933	NY-20	Republican Party	La Guardia was a progressive. Although La Guardia ran on the Socialist Party ticket in 1924, he was not close with the party. In 1922, he ran for Congress and won on the Republican line; in 1924, he won on the Socialist and Progressive fusion line; and in 1926-1928-1930, he won as a Republican again. In the 1925–27 session of Congress, the clerk listed La Guardia's partisan affiliation as Socialist, leading Victor L. Berger (the only other Socialist in Congress) to call La Guardia "my whip".
Fiorello La Guardia		Mar 4, 1925	Mar 4, 1927	NY-20	Socialist and Progressive (fusion)	La Guardia was a progressive. Although La Guardia ran on the Socialist Party ticket in 1924, he was not close with the party. In 1922, he ran for Congress and won on the Republican line; in 1924, he won on the Socialist and Progressive fusion line; and in 1926-1928-1930, he won as a Republican again. In the 1925–27 session of Congress, the clerk listed La Guardia's partisan affiliation as Socialist, leading Victor L. Berger (the only other Socialist in Congress) to call La Guardia "my whip".
Fiorello La Guardia		Mar 4, 1923	Mar 4, 1925	NY-20	Republican Party	La Guardia was a progressive. Although La Guardia ran on the Socialist Party ticket in 1924, he was not close with the party. In 1922, he ran for Congress and won on the Republican line; in 1924, he won on the Socialist and Progressive fusion line; and in 1926-1928-1930, he won as a Republican again. In the 1925–27 session of Congress, the clerk listed La Guardia's partisan affiliation as Socialist, leading Victor L. Berger (the only other Socialist in Congress) to call La Guardia "my whip".
Fiorello La Guardia		Mar 4, 1917	Dec 31, 1919	NY-14	Republican and Progressive (fusion)	La Guardia was a progressive. Although La Guardia ran on the Socialist Party ticket in 1924, he was not close with the party. In 1922, he ran for Congress and won on the Republican line; in 1924, he won on the Socialist and Progressive fusion line; and in 1926-1928-1930, he won as a Republican again. In the 1925–27 session of Congress, the clerk listed La Guardia's partisan affiliation as Socialist, leading Victor L. Berger (the only other Socialist in Congress) to call La Guardia "my whip".
Thomas Ryum Amlie		Jan 3, 1935	Jan 3, 1939	WI-1	Wisconsin Progressive Party (Note: Amlie won on the Republican Party line in the 1931 special, but lost the 1932 Republican primary, and won on the Wisconsin Progressive Party line in 1934. In 1940, Amlie joined the Democratic Party as a "Roosevelt Democrat", but lost his election.)	Amlie was a progressive inspired by Thorstein Veblen and Technocracy. In a September 1933 speech to the League for Independent Political Action, Amlie advocated replacing "production for profit" with a planned "economy of abundance" with "production for use"; the League subsequently established the Farmer-Labor Political Federation with Amlie as chairman.
Thomas Ryum Amlie		Oct 13, 1931	Mar 3, 1933	WI-1	Republican Party	Amlie was a progressive inspired by Thorstein Veblen and Technocracy. In a September 1933 speech to the League for Independent Political Action, Amlie advocated replacing "production for profit" with a planned "economy of abundance" with "production for use"; the League subsequently established the Farmer-Labor Political Federation with Amlie as chairman.
Jerry J. O'Connell		Jan 3, 1937	Jan 3, 1939	MT-01	Democratic Party	O'Connell was one of the few current, former, or future members of Congress to publicly support the Spanish Republic in the Spanish Civil War. Although he was a member of several organizations supported by the Communist Party USA, O'Connell was never publicly a CPUSA member or an ideological communist; he denied identifying as such while under oath.
Will Rogers Jr.		Jan 3, 1943	May 23, 1944	CA-16	Democratic Party	Rogers was one of the few current, former, or future members of Congress to publicly support the Spanish Republic in the Spanish Civil War.
Allard K. Lowenstein		Jan 3, 1969	Jan 3, 1971	NY-05	Democratic Party	Lowenstein aligned with the New Left and was supported in his campaigns by prominent DSA members such as Ron Dellums, though he never identified as a socialist.
David Bonior		Jan 3, 1977	Jan 3, 2003	MI-10	Democratic Party	Bonior was a progressive and a DSA member.
George Crockett Jr.		Nov 4, 1980	Jan 3, 1991	MI-13	Democratic Party	Crockett was a progressive and a member of the National Lawyers Guild who defended Communist Party USA members during the Smith Act trials. Crockett attended DSA's founding conference but did not join.
Major Owens		Jan 3, 1983	Jan 3, 2007	NY-11	Democratic Party	Owens identified as a progressive and was a DSA member.
Jerry Nadler		Nov 3, 1992	Jan 3, 2027	NY-12	Democratic Party	Nadler is a progressive, was a DSOC member, and was a DSA member.
Danny Davis		Jan 3, 1997	Jan 3, 2027	IL-7	Democratic Party	Davis is described as a progressive. He was a member of DSA and the New Party. Both the New Party and Chicago Democratic Socialists of America endorsed Davis in his successful 1996 election campaign. In 2020 and 2022, Chicago DSA endorsed an opponent in the Democratic primary.
Raúl Grijalva		Jan 3, 2003	Mar 13, 2025	AZ-7	Democratic Party	Until 1974, Grijalva was a member of the left-wing Raza Unida Party.
Karen Bass		Jan 3, 2011	Dec 9, 2022	CA-33, CA-37	Democratic Party	In her youth, Bass was a member of the pro-Cuban Revolution Venceremos Brigade. In 2020, Bass publicly rejected socialism, saying, "I'm not a socialist, I'm not a communist. I've belonged to one party my entire life and that's the Democratic Party and I'm a Christian." In 2026, DSA member Nithya Raman primaried Bass for Mayor of Los Angeles.
Ilhan Omar		Jan 3, 2019	Current	MN-5	Democratic Party	Omar is a progressive. In 2019, Donald Trump labelled Omar an "America-hating socialist" while a crowd chanted "send her back". Omar has not described herself as a socialist, and she has never been a DSA member, though in 2020, the DSA called her a "friend".
Ayanna Pressley		Jan 3, 2019	Current	MA-07	Democratic Party	Pressley has stated that she is not a democratic socialist.
Shri Thanedar		Jan 3, 2021	Jan 3, 2027	MI-13	Democratic Party	Thanedar joined the Democratic Socialists of America after he was first elected. In September 2023, the DSA expelled him after he invited Narendra Modi to speak at the United States Capitol. In October 2023, Thanedar renounced his DSA membership, citing the October 7 attacks.Thanedar would go on to lose re-election in the 2026 Democratic Primary to democratic socialist and DSA member Donovan McKinney.
Maxwell Frost		Jan 3, 2023	Current	FL-10	Democratic Party	Frost is a progressive. Republicans have called Frost a socialist. He has disputed this label, describing socialism as something "[his] family fled".

=== Incoming members ===
The following candidates won election to Congress in the 2026 elections and will be seated on January 3, 2027:

As of November 3, 2026:

Member	Photo	Term start	Term end	Dist	Ballot line	Note
Abdul El-Sayed		Jan 3, 2027	Current	MI-Sen	Democratic Party	El-Sayed is progressive. Donald Trump and other Republicans labelled El-Sayed a communist or socialist. El-Sayed identifies as a "a capitalist who understands how capitalism works", not a socialist. El-Sayed is not a DSA member or DSA endorsee.
Troy Jackson		Jan 3, 2027	Current	ME-Sen	Democratic Party	Jackson is progressive but not socialist. Jackson was endorsed by Maine DSA.

== See also ==
- History of the socialist movement in the United States
- The Squad (United States Congress), which contains many of the members above
- Congressional Progressive Caucus
- Millennial socialism
- Other lists:
  - List of elected socialist mayors in the United States
  - List of Democratic Socialists of America public officeholders
  - List of Green politicians who have held office in the United States
  - List of Communist Party USA members who have held office in the United States
