= Muriel Tillinghast =

American civil rights activist

Muriel Tillinghast is an American civil rights activist and former Student Nonviolent Coordinating Committee (SNCC) field secretary. Her efforts include volunteering for the Freedom Summer Project in Mississippi where she helped start the famed 1964 Freedom School and led Mississippi's Council of Federated Organizations (COFO).

== Civil rights activism ==
=== SNCC and Freedom Summer ===
Immediately after graduating from Howard University, Tillinghast volunteered to lead a SNCC project in Mississippi. At the dismay of her family, she decided to accept a position in Greenville, Mississippi as part of the 1964 Summer Project. Her involvement in the Summer Project included organizing a Freedom School to teach African American history and discuss civic participation and voting rights. As a SNCC activist, she worked to register voters and canvass across the county. Despite the unfamiliar environment and the historical racial violence in Mississippi, Tillinghast went on to lead SNCC's projects within Washington, Issaquena, and Sharkey counties. She later became the director of that same Greenville project and leader of the state of Mississippi's COFO (the umbrella organization that oversaw SNCC and the 1964 Summer Project), making her one of three women to become project leads in Mississippi.

=== Continued activism and political career ===
Following Muriel Tillinghast's involvement in SNCC and the Civil Rights Movement, she has remained an advocate for human and civil rights. In the 1970s, she became a tenured instructor at the Atlanta University School of Social Work. Since then, she has worked extensively on issues of tenant rights and prison education through her role as an administrator in New York City's Department of Housing Preservation and Development and as a prison educational administrator at the Brooklyn House of Detention and Rikers Island.

In 1996, Tillinghast was selected as the New York Green Party candidate for vice president alongside Ralph Nader.
