= 2006 United States Shadow Senator election in the District of Columbia =

- November 7, 2006
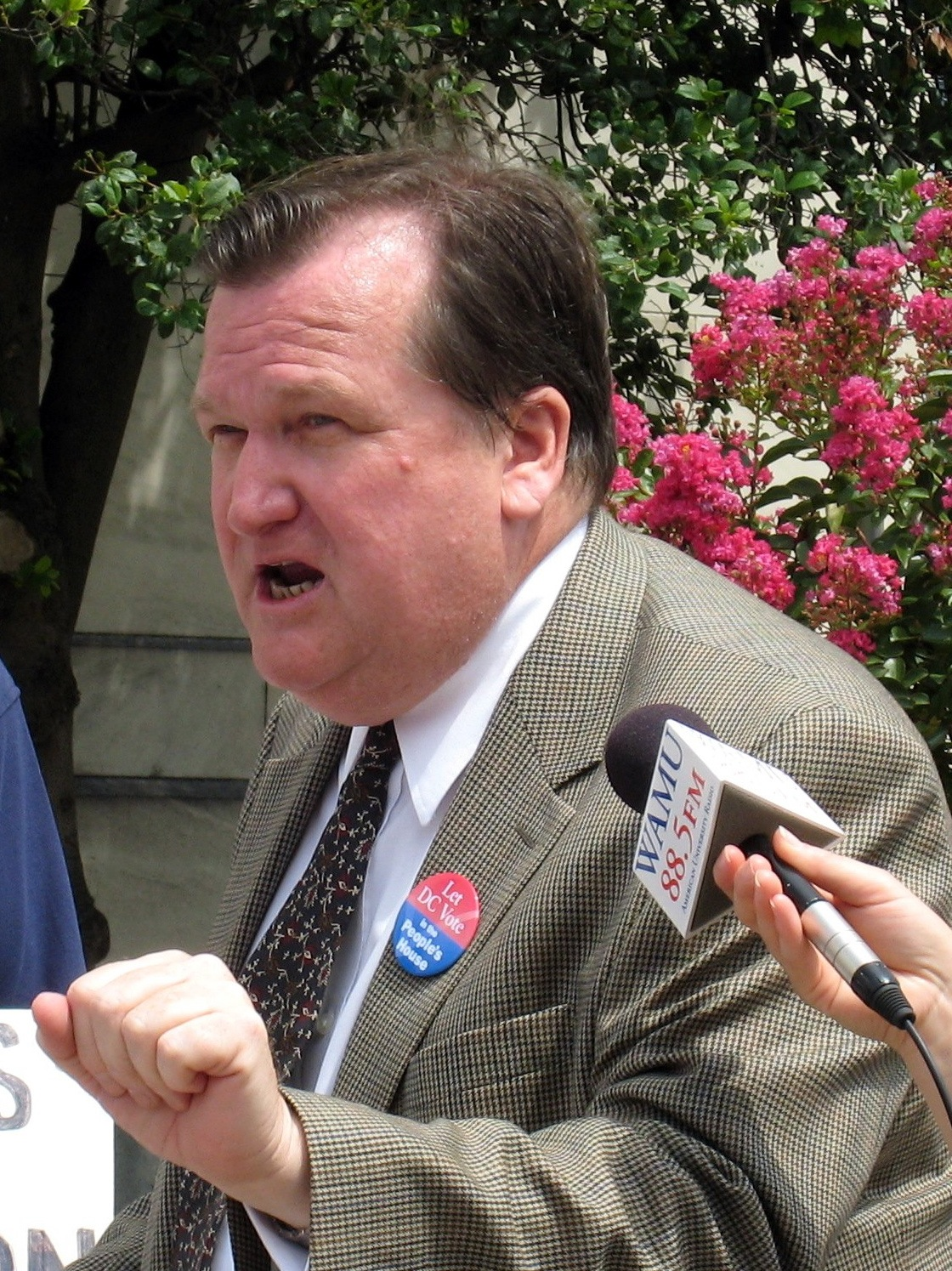

Nominee	Michael D. Brown	Joyce Robinson-Paul
Party	Democratic	DC Statehood Green
Popular vote	90,336	15,352
Percentage	84.16%	14.30%
Shadow Senator before election
Florence Pendleton
Democratic
Elected Shadow Senator
Michael D. Brown
Democratic

The 2006 United States Shadow Senator election in the District of Columbia took place on November 7, 2006, to elect a shadow member to the United States Senate to represent the District of Columbia. The member was only recognized by the District of Columbia and not officially sworn or seated by the United States Senate.

Incumbent Shadow Senator Florence Pendleton ran for reelection, but was unable to make it onto the ballot as she had only 1,559 valid signatures, short of the necessary 2,000. The Democratic primary was won by Michael Brown, who went on to secure an easy victory in the November general election.

== Primary elections ==
Party primaries took place on September 12, 2006.

=== Democratic primary ===
==== Candidates ====
===== On ballot =====
- Michael Donald Brown, political consultant
- Philip Pannell, political activist and community organizer

===== Failed to make ballot =====
- Florence Pendleton, incumbent Shadow Senator

==== Campaign ====
Brown's landslide victory was unexpected, and many attributed it to voters confusing Brown with the similarly named mayoral candidate Michael A. Brown, who was also on the ballot. Prior to winning the primary, Brown was a little-known political consultant who spent less than $1,000 on his campaign.

Pendleton, who was kicked off the ballot after Pannell challenged her signatures, ran a write-in campaign with little success. She also floated the idea of running as an independent in November, although ultimately that did not occur.

==== Results ====
Democratic primary results
Party	Candidate	Votes	%
Democratic	Michael D. Brown	62,415	73.15%
Democratic	Philip Pannell	21,552	25.26%
Write-in		1,363	1.60%
Total votes		85,330	100.00%

== General election ==
No Republican filed to run, and Brown's only opposition was Joyce Robinson-Paul of the D.C. Statehood Green Party. Brown would achieve a victory, winning more than 84% of the vote.

=== Candidates ===
- Michael D. Brown (Democratic)
- Joyce Robinson-Paul (D.C. Statehood Green)

=== Results ===
General election results
Party	Candidate	Votes	%
Democratic	Michael D. Brown	90,336	84.16%
DC Statehood Green	Joyce Robinson-Paul	15,352	14.30%
Write-in		1,647	1.53%
Total votes		107,335	100.00%
Democratic hold			
