= 2018 United States Shadow Senator election in the District of Columbia =

- November 6, 2018
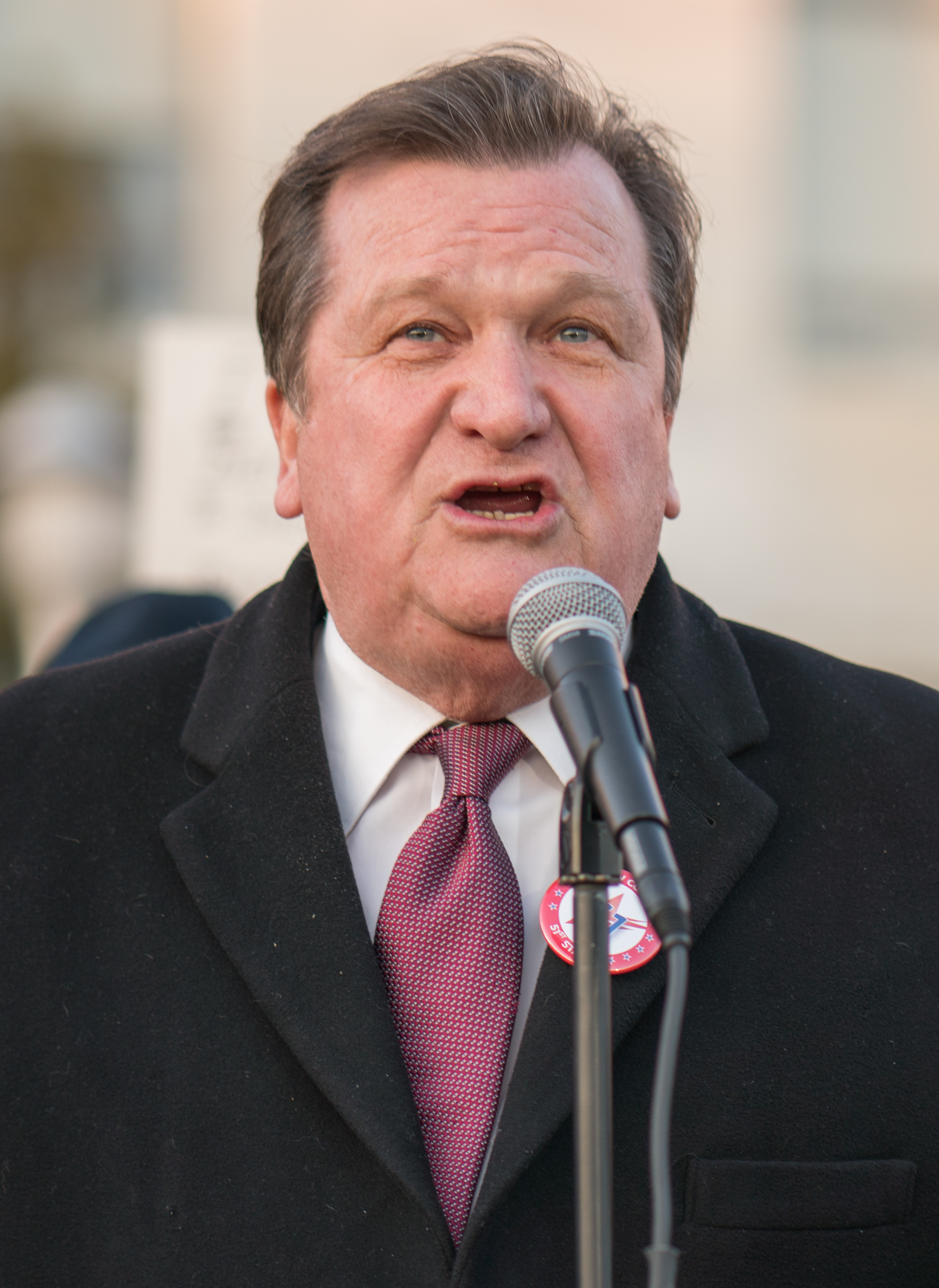

| Nominee | Michael D. Brown | Eleanor Ory |
| Party | Democratic | DC Statehood Green |
| Popular vote | 178,573 | 33,016 |
| Percentage | 82.89% | 15.32% |
- Brown: 70–80% 80–90% >90%
Shadow Senator before election
Michael D. Brown
Independent
Elected Shadow Senator
Michael D. Brown
Democratic

The 2018 United States Shadow Senator election in the District of Columbia took place on November 6, 2018, to elect a shadow member to the United States Senate to represent the District of Columbia. The member was only recognized by the District of Columbia and not officially sworn or seated by the United States Senate. Incumbent Mike Brown was re-elected to a third term.

== Democratic primary ==
The Democratic primary took place on Tuesday, June 19, 2018. About 76% of registered voters in the District of Columbia were registered with the Democratic Party, compared with only 6% of registered Republicans. The winner of the Democratic primary almost always wins the general election.

=== Candidates ===
- Michael D. Brown, incumbent Shadow Senator
- Andria Thomas, business strategist and activist

=== Campaign ===
Thomas' campaign raised $44,000 and spent $34,800. Brown's campaign raised and spent only $12,000 and $1,200, respectively.

Thomas' campaign accused Brown of coasting on the name recognition of another D.C. politician, Michael A. Brown, a black former-councilman who remained popular in spite of a federal bribery conviction. Michael D. Brown dismissed the claim in an article for The Washington Post saying, "the implication that I win because African Americans are too uninformed to realize there are two people with a common name is insulting to the hundreds of thousands of D.C. voters who have supported my campaigns."

=== Endorsements ===
Andria Thomas

Members of the Council of the District of Columbia

- Brianne K. Nadeau, Member of the Council of the District of Columbia Ward 1
- Charles Allen, Member of the Council of the District of Columbia Ward 6
- David Grosso, Member of the Council of the District of Columbia At-large

Attorneys General

- Karl A. Racine

Organizations

- DC for Democracy

United States Senate Democratic primary election in the District of Columbia, 2018 Brown—>60% Brown—50–60% Thomas—>50%

=== Results ===
Democratic primary results
| Party | Candidate | Votes | % |
|---|---|---|---|
| Democratic | Michael D. Brown (Incumbent) | 33,366 | 51.0 |
| Democratic | Andria Thomas | 30,920 | 47.3 |
| Democratic | Write-ins | 1,090 | 0.89 |
| Total votes | | 65,376 | 100.00 |

== D.C. Statehood Green primary ==
=== Candidates ===
- Eleanor Ory

=== Results ===
D.C. Statehood Green primary
| Party | Candidate | Votes | % |
|---|---|---|---|
| DC Statehood Green | Write-ins | 95 | 100.0 |
| Total votes | | 95 | 100.00 |

== Independents ==
=== Candidates ===
- Professor Alpha Bah Esq., MBA
- Marcus D. Thompson

== General election ==
=== Candidates ===
- Michael D. Brown (Democratic), incumbent U.S. Senator
- Eleanor Ory (D.C. Statehood Green)
- Professor Alpha Bah Esq., MBA (Independent)
- Marcus D. Thompson (Independent)

=== Results ===
General election results
| Party | Candidate | Votes | % |
|---|---|---|---|
| Democratic | Michael D. Brown (incumbent) | 178,573 | 82.89 |
| DC Statehood Green | Eleanor Ory | 33,016 | 15.32 |
| Write-in | | 3,852 | 1.79 |
| Total votes | | 215,441 | 100.00 |
