= Joe Green (entrepreneur) =

US social entrepreneur & investor (b.1983)

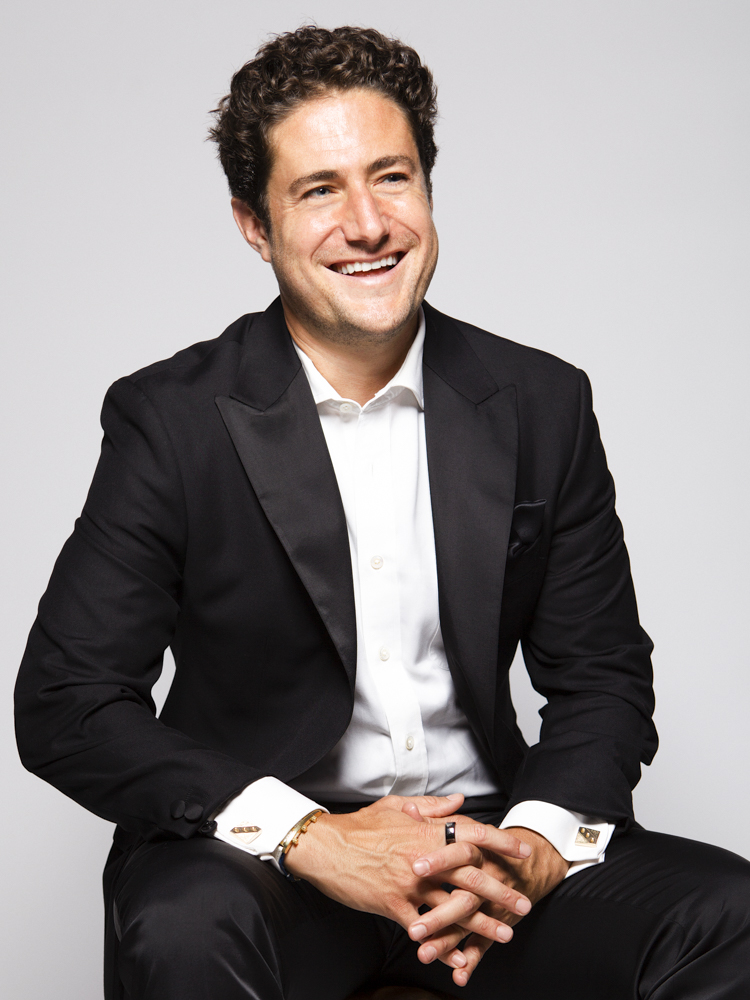
- Born: June 28, 1983 (age 42)
- Education: Harvard College
- Occupation: Entrepreneur

Joe Green is a serial social entrepreneur and investor based in San Francisco, CA. He is the co-founder and President of the Psychedelic Science Funders Collaborative, a nonprofit donor network that supports research on psychedelic medicine. Green is also the co-founder of Treehouse Co-Living, a company that develops community living apartment complexes in Los Angeles, CA.

He was the co-founder (along with Sean Parker) of Causes, a company most famous for its Facebook app designed to encourage philanthropy and make giving a social experience. He was also the founding president and is one of the founders (along with Facebook founder Mark Zuckerberg) of FWD.us, a bipartisan political advocacy group created to support comprehensive immigration reform.

== Life and career ==
=== Early life ===
Green grew up in Santa Monica, where he attended public schools. His father Mark Green is a math professor at UCLA, and his mother Kathryn Kert Green is an artist. While in high school in Santa Monica, Green was interested in politics and community activism. According to a Los Angeles Times story, Green "ran for the local school board when he was 17 and campaigned for a living wage for Santa Monica hotel and restaurant workers." Green is Jewish, and attended Leo Baeck Temple in his childhood.

=== College ===
In the Fall of 2003, while an undergraduate at Harvard University, Green helped Mark Zuckerberg (who would later found Facebook) create Facemash, a website that allowed users to compare and rate the faces of Harvard undergraduates for attractiveness. Both Green and Zuckerberg were threatened with expulsion by Harvard's administrative board.

Green had reportedly attempted to persuade Mark Zuckerberg to create a social network centered around politics, but Zuckerberg created Facebook instead.

In light of the trouble with Facemash, Green's father advised him against collaborating with Zuckerberg on projects similar to Facemash in the future. As a result, Green declined Zuckerberg's offer of shares in Facebook. Had Green accepted, these shares would have been worth billions of dollars at the time of the Facebook IPO.

Green studied under Marshall Ganz, who sparked his interest further in community activism and grassroots organizing. In 2004, Green worked on Democratic nominee John Kerry's 2004 presidential campaign. In 2005, Green started Essembly, a nonpartisan social network that helped connect people with others who shared their political views.

=== Causes ===
In 2007, Green co-founded Causes (a for-profit business) along with Sean Parker, famous for co-founding Plaxo and for his early involvement with Facebook and Napster. The Causes platform enabled users to create grassroots groups that take action on a social issue or support a specific non-profit organization. These groups, individually called a "cause," are building blocks for most activity on the site. Causes allowed anyone, or any organization, to start a campaign regardless of size. Small nonprofits were offered an opportunity to build extensive online communities of supporters. The platform grew to 186 million users in 159 countries, with a billion total ‘actions’ (causes that were acted upon by users). Joe Green stepped down as CEO in 2011 to co-found NationBuilder, and Matt Mahan took over as CEO of Causes.

=== NationBuilder ===
Green and Jim Gilliam co-founded NationBuilder, a leading platform for nonprofits and political campaigns to organize communities. Green served as the first president of the company from 2012 to 2013, and then transitioned from president to board member. NationBuilder aims to be a nonpartisan service, reflecting the founder's goal to unite people—regardless of affiliation—around a passion to take action. In 2019, NationBuilder subscribers used the platform to mobilize 356,000 volunteers, make 17.5 million individual contacts, and raise $372 million.

=== FWD.us ===
In April 2013, a lobbying group called FWD.us was founded by Green and Mark Zuckerberg, with Green acting as the president. The group, with staff in both Silicon Valley and Washington, D.C. and with most of its contributors from the Silicon Valley area, aims to lobby the United States government for its vision of immigration reform, improvements to education, and enabling breakthrough technologies with benefits widely distributed to the public. Prior to the launch of the group, a controversial private memo prepared by Green for prospective donors was leaked to Politico. In September 2014, Re/code reported that Joe Green was leaving FWD.us, and his departure appeared to have been forced. A blog post on the FWD.us website confirmed the leadership change.

=== Treehouse ===
Green is a co-founder and board chairman of Treehouse Co-Living, a co-living project currently developing community-oriented apartments in Los Angeles. Green co-founded Treehouse with Prophet Walker and Brent Gaisford as a co-living space oriented towards building community. Both Green and Walker found they were happiest in the tight-knit communities of their respective childhoods, so they sought to create a modern version with Treehouse. As of January 2021 Treehouse's first community, Treehouse Hollywood, was nearly full.

=== Psychedelic Science Funders Collaborative ===
Green co-founded the Psychedelic Science Funders Collaborative (PSFC) with Graham Boyd in 2017. PSFC, a 501(c)(3) nonprofit, supports research on and clinical trials of physician-prescribed psychedelic medicines and patient access to these treatments. PSFC fosters a community of philanthropists dedicated to supporting psychedelic medicine in the face of widespread underfunding. In 2019 PSFC made its largest grant to date, a $4,140,000 gift to the Multidisciplinary Association for Psychedelic Studies (MAPS). In August 2020, PSFC completed a $30 million fundraising campaign in partnership with MAPS to support the completion of phase 3 clinical trials of MDMA-assisted psychotherapy.

=== Investments ===
Green is an angel investor in several startups, including Asana, Dropbox, FabFitFun, Fin, Lyft, Shift, Manny's and Once Upon a Farm. In February 2013, Green joined Andreessen Horowitz as an entrepreneur-in-residence.

=== Philanthropy ===
Green is board co-chair of Or Halev, a center for Jewish meditation. He has also supported MAPS and the Usona Institute.
