= NationBuilder =

American software company

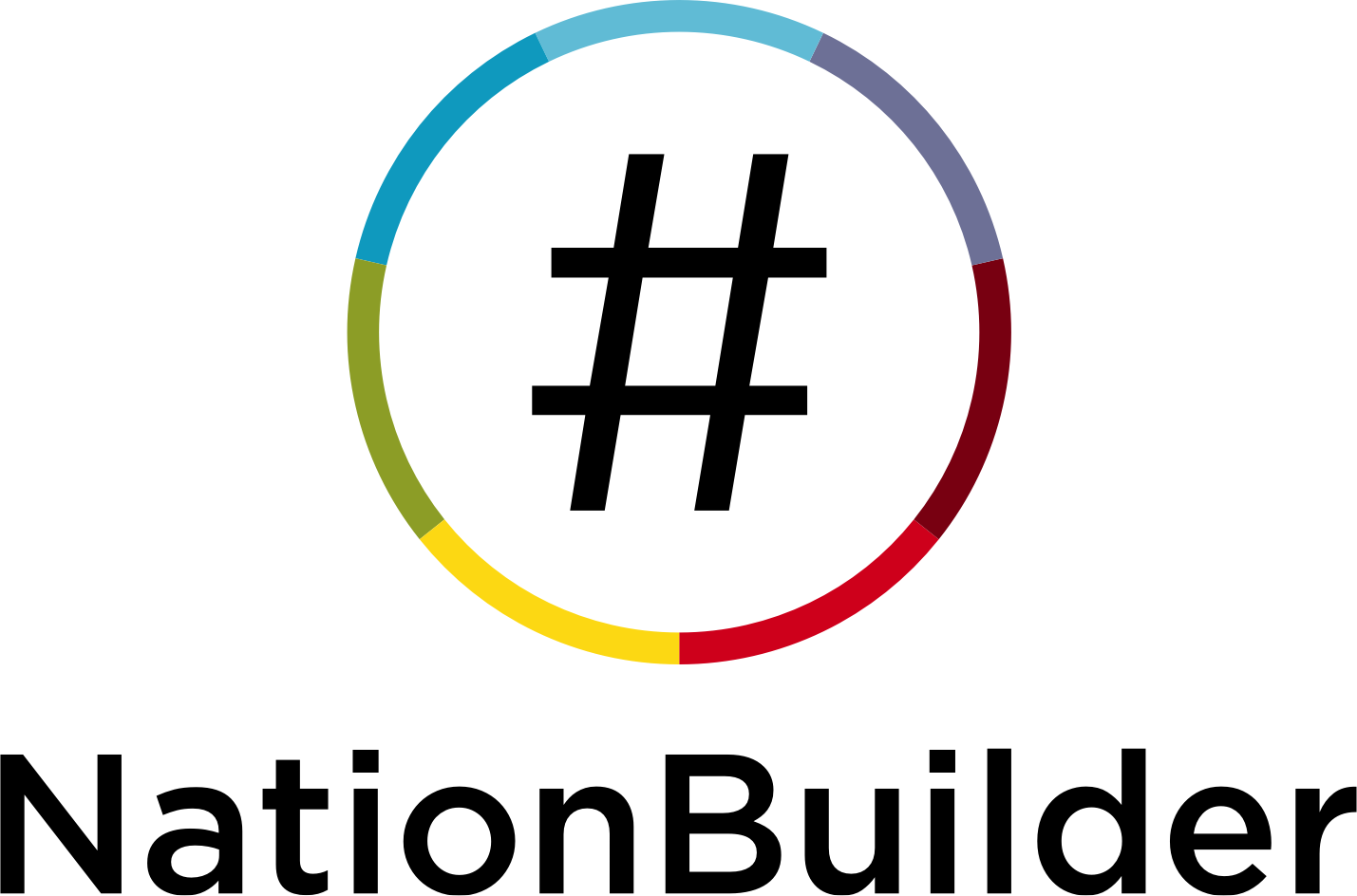
- Industry: Technology software
- Founded: 2009
- Founder: Jim Gilliam
- Headquarters: Los Angeles
- Key people: Lea Endres (Co-founder & CEO); Jesse Haff (Co-founder & VP of Design)
- Website: nationbuilder.com

NationBuilder is a Los Angeles-based technology start-up that develops content management and customer relationship management (CRM) software. Although the company initially targeted political campaigns and nonprofit organizations, it later expanded its marketing efforts to include other people and organizations trying to build an online following, such as artists, musicians and restaurants. The software uses voter data such as names, addresses and other information, such as previous voting records in the case of political campaigns, to allow users to centralize, build and manage campaigns by integrating various communication tools like websites, newsletters, text messaging and social media channels under one platform.

Among other features, the software enables users to quickly create websites, build databases through registrations, send targeted newsletters, analyse data from multiple sources and leverage micro-donations. The software's appeal towards political campaigns comes from the combination of a number of previously separate campaigning services, channels and data sources into a single platform that was presented as a facile solution for non-technical users and which enabled political campaigners to quickly deploy campaigns by convincing numerous people to donate.

== History ==
NationBuilder was founded in 2009 in Los Angeles by Jim Gilliam and launched in 2011. In 2012 Joe Green joined NationBuilder as co-founder and president. He left that role 11 months later in February 2013.

Gilliam was previously a movie-maker who co-founded Brave New Films with Robert Greenwald and had sought funding for his films through crowd-sourcing. Green, who studied organizing at Harvard and was Mark Zuckerberg's roommate, is also the co-founder of the Causes Facebook app; he left NationBuilder in 2013.

Since its founding, the company has helped campaigns raise $1.2 billion. In 2012, NationBuilder announced that 1,000 subscribers have used its software to amass 2.5 million supporters and raise $12 million in campaign donations. In 2015 it has helped raise $264 million, recruit over one million volunteers and coordinate some 129,000 events.

By 2016, the company said its software was used by about 40 percent of all contested elections at the state and national level in the U.S., which included 3,000 political campaigns. Using such software is easier in the U.S. than Europe, where comprehensive data protection and privacy laws are in effect since 2018.

The Scottish National Party was the first political party to use NationBuilder, harvesting vast amounts of data pertaining to voter activity via websites such as Facebook and Twitter. This revelation prompted outrage over privacy concerns. Guy Herbert of the No2ID campaign called the use of such data harvesting tools by the SNP "utterly hypocritical".

== Funding ==
Investors in NationBuilder include Chris Hughes - the Facebook co-founder, Sean Parker - first president of Facebook and co-founder of Napster and Causes, Dan Senor - the former Republican foreign-policy adviser and Ben Horowitz, co-founder of Andreessen Horowitz. In 2012, it has raised $6.3 million in funding from a number of investors.

== Notable implementations ==
The software is reported to have played a role in some public elections in Europe, the US and New Zealand, as well as non-profit initiatives, and political parties in Australia. Notable users include Bernie Sanders, Mitch McConnell, Andrew Yang, Theresa May, Amnesty International, the NAACP and Donald Trump.

=== France ===
La République En Marche used NationBuilder in their campaign for the 2017 National Assembly.

=== New Zealand ===
NationBuilder's services are used by New Zealand political parties, including in the campaigns of both the National and Labour parties in the 2017 general election.

=== United Kingdom ===
Despite stricter data protection and privacy laws in the UK and EU, NationBuilder was used to significant impact in a number of UK elections, most notably in the 2016 campaign for withdrawal of the United Kingdom from the European Union. The company later made a public announcement that both sides in that campaign had used its software.

=== United States ===
NationBuilder was used in the Donald Trump presidential campaign to advance his election efforts and eventually win the 2016 presidential race. Jill Stein of the Green Party, Republican Rick Santorum, and independent supporters of various candidates all used NationBuilder during their 2016 runs for president.

During the 2018 US election cycle, political entities paid more than $1 million for the use of NationBuilder. Among the entities paying the most were Donald J. Trump for President, Prosperity Action and the Republican Party of Tennessee.
