= Brit Morin =

American CEO, entrepreneur (born 1985)

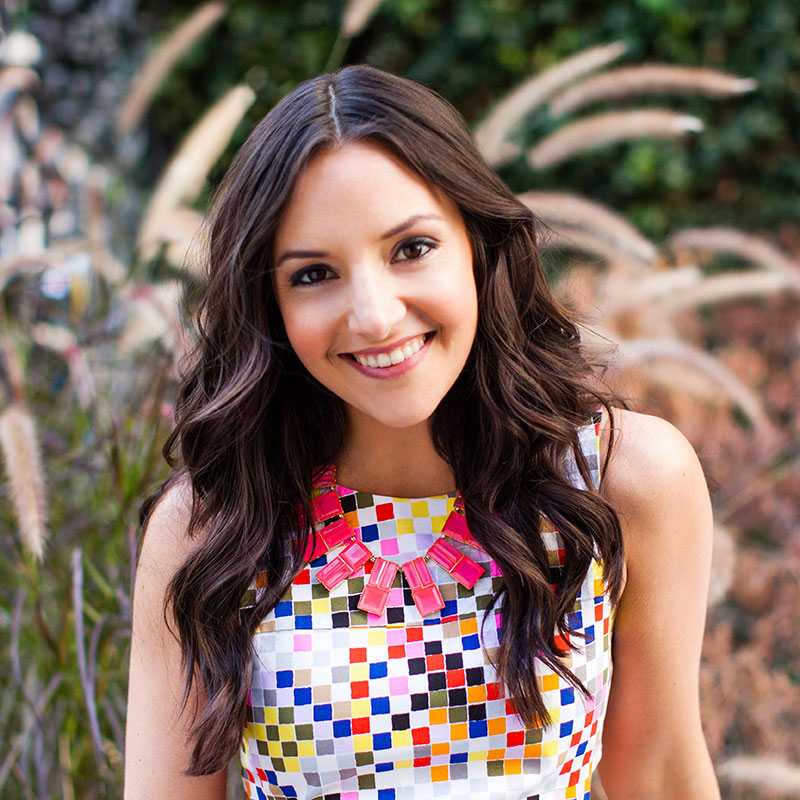
- Born: December 6, 1985 (age 40); San Antonio, Texas
- Education: University of Texas at Austin
- Occupations: Co-founder and managing partner at Offline Ventures Co-Founder of BFF Founder and CEO of Brit + Co
- Spouse: Dave Morin (m. 2011)
- Children: 3

Brittany "Brit" Morin (born 6 December 1985) is an American venture capitalist, entrepreneur, and technologist. She is the co-founder and managing partner of Offline Ventures, an early stage venture fund and studio, founder and CEO of Brit + Co, a media and digital education company based in San Francisco, the founder of Selfmade, an education and community platform for female entrepreneurs, and the founder of BFF, an open-access community for women and nonbinary people in Web3.

Morin is the author of Homemakers: A Domestic Handbook for the Digital Generation, published by HarperCollins, and as of 2021, writes a business advice column, "Dear Brit", in Entrepreneur Magazine.

== Early life and education ==
Morin was born in San Antonio, Texas. She studied business and communications at the University of Texas at Austin.

== Career ==
After graduation, Morin moved to Silicon Valley. She worked at Apple on iTunes and later spent four years at Google, where she helped launch projects such as Google TV, Google Maps, and iGoogle under Marissa Mayer.

=== Brit + Co ===
In 2011, at age 25, Morin left Google to start Brit + Co, a San Francisco-based website and lifestyle brand targeted at women. By 2017 the company was reaching 130 million people per month.

The company raised $1.25 million in initial seed funding in April 2012. The following year, it closed funding rounds with $6.3 million in Series A funding led by Oak Investment Partners. Led by Intel Capital, the company received $20 million in Series B funding in 2015, allowing them to make their first acquisition of a DIY app called Snapguide. By 2017, it was reported that Brit + Co had received $45 million in venture capital funding from investors like Verizon Ventures and Marissa Mayer, and was selected for the Disney Accelerator Program.

=== Offline Ventures ===
In 2020 Morin launched the venture capital fund and studio Offline Ventures with Dave Morin, Nate Bosshard, and James Higa, to invest in and incubate early stage technology companies developing health technology.

=== Selfmade ===
In 2020 Morin launched Selfmade, a subscription based marketplace and community for female founders to learn how to start and develop a business.

=== BFF ===
In 2022, Morin and fellow entrepreneur Jamie Schmidt co-founded BFF, an online community to educate women and non-binary people on web3.

=== Podcasts ===
From 2020 - 2022 Morin hosted the podcast "Teach Me Something New" in partnership with iHeartMedia, interviewing guests such as Ashton Kutcher, Mila Kunis, Meena Harris and Glennon Doyle.

In 2022, Morin launched First In Line, a podcast on which Morin talks to entrepreneurs, celebrities, and CEOs about the future of business.

== Boards ==
Morin was formerly on the board of directors for the Girl Scouts of the USA, and is a board member of Life360.

== Personal life ==
Morin is married to Dave Morin, an entrepreneur. They live in Mill Valley with their two sons and one daughter.

== Awards ==
In 2015, she was listed as one of BBC's 100 Women. In 2014 she was on the Forbes "30 Under 30" - Media list, and in 2017 she was listed as a "30 Under 30" All-Star Alum. Morin was also named Glamour's Female Entrepreneur Innovator, and was on Fortune's list of the 10 Most Promising Entrepreneurs in 2015, Refinery29's list of 30 Under 30, Adweek's Creative 100 in 2018, Ad Age's 40 Under 40 in 2018, Parents magazine's "Most Influential Millennial Moms," and one of ELLE magazine's American Women at 30.

== Writing ==
In 2015 Morin wrote her first book, Homemakers: A Domestic Handbook for the Digital Generation, published by HarperCollins. In 2021 she launched the bimonthly business advice column "Dear Brit" in Entrepreneur Magazine, and became a founding member of the Fast Company Executive Board, publishing articles on the magazine's website.

== Bibliography ==
- Morin, Brit (2015). Homemakers: A Domestic Handbook for the Digital Generation. HarperCollins. ISBN 9780062332509.
