= Brigade Media =

Civic technology platform

- Company type: Private company
- Website type: Civic Technology Platform
- Founded: April 4, 2014; 12 years ago
- Headquarters: San Francisco, United States of America
- Area served: United States (2014–2019)
- Founders: Matt Mahan (CEO); James Windon (President); Jason Putorti (Design); John Thrall (Engineering); Miche Capone (Product)
- Key people: Sean Parker (Chairman)
- Industry: Civic Technology
- Subsidiaries: Votizen; Causes; Voter
- Website: https://brigade.com
- Current status: Offline

Brigade Media, also known as Brigade, was a civic technology platform that was formed on June 4, 2014, and founded by James Windon, Jason Putorti, John Thrall, Matt Mahan, and Miche Capone. The platform was intended to help users connect with others who share the same or similar views and to voice their opinions, create debates, or organize petitions. This process was intended to make the users' concerns more visible to and influential towards the United States policymakers. In early 2019 the engineering team at Brigade was acqui-hired by Pinterest. The remaining company assets and IP, including the Causes assets, were purchased by GovTech app Countable.

== Leadership ==
James Windon was the president of Brigade. He previously acted as a vice-president of Causes and worked with the World Trade Organization in Switzerland. Matt Mahan was the CEO of Brigade and previously served as the CEO of Causes. John Thrall worked in engineering, Jason Putorti in design, and Miche Capone in production. Sean Parker was the chairman of the startup, sat on the board of Spotify and was the founding president of Facebook.

== History ==
=== 2014–2016: private beta ===
In the first stage, the app asked users to agree or disagree on a position. Brigade then split up its users into those who agreed on the issue and those who disagreed. Participants were allowed to write their own opinions on positions and ask those in their respective group if they were "for" or "against" the opinion stated.

=== 2016–2018: open beta ===
==== Voter guide ====
A few weeks before the November 2016 elections, Brigade created a ballot guide for its users and ran it in San Francisco and Manchester, New Hampshire. As the user entered the application, he or she was prompted with questions regarding government and social issues, and was given the choice of agree, disagree, or unsure as their answer choices. After completing the questionnaire, the guide gave recommendations on whom to vote for and which propositions to pass or not pass. Furthermore, the app also determined these choices based on those a user socializes with on Brigade. Brigade users could pledge their votes to the candidates and propositions listed on the ballot. With these pledges, the app tracked which candidates had more pledged votes in real time. Users were further able to recruit pledges from other users for their favorite candidates or propositions.

==== Voter verification ====
Brigade also implemented a voter verification service. With voter verification, a user could determine how similar or different a political representative's viewpoints were from their own. This data was received from Google's Civic API with geographic information on 520,000 American elected officials.

==== Acquisitions ====
Brigade Media acquired Causes, Votizen, and Voter. At the time of acquisition, Causes was the largest online platform where candidates could campaign; Votizen functioned as a tool for voters to learn more about their leaders; and Voter aimed to put voters and politicians together via shared viewpoints. These three companies helped Brigade gain social media presence and find intelligent workers in the field.

=== Background ===
As technology advanced, it was assumed that the average individual would have further access to voting, and therefore, voting numbers would increase. Instead, voter turnout at the elections remained low, with numbers at the presidential elections between 50% and 60% of the US population in the last 50 years. At the 2014 midterm election, only 36.4% of people voted, the lowest percentage since 1942. It was hoped that civic technology will incentivize and educate its users to vote. Brigade's voter ballot was an attempt as a civic technology platform to increase voter participation as well as educate its users about candidates and propositions.

== Functionality ==
Brigade interacted with American voters by linking its users to the same held concerns. The opinions of elected officials on those concerns were provided and metrics about the candidate most similar in concerns and degree of concern would be available.

== Funding ==
In 2014, Brigade Media received about $9.5 million in seed money from Sean Parker, Marc Benioff, and Ron Conway.

== Shutdown ==
The founders left the company at different times: Putorti in August 2015, Capone in April 2016, and Windon in March 2017. Following the 2018 midterms, Brigade's assets were acquired by Countable and the employees were hired by Pinterest. The app no longer exists on the App Store (iOS) and the web site is listed for sale.

== Criticism and controversy ==
=== Criticism ===
Barbara Simons, a computer scientist from IBM, asserted that all current forms of digital voting devices are hackable, and that the best unhackable option is paper. A Canadian study revealed that online voting platforms may not improve voter participation, and found that those who did not already vote on paper ballots did not vote with digital devices; instead, non-paper voting forms are simply more convenient for those who would have already decided to vote. As such, the Independent Panel On Internet Voting did not recommend internet voting to the Legislative Assembly of British Columbia in 2012. Writer Douglas Rushkoff offered criticism about the use case for Brigade in 2022, writing that "Brigade's engineers built some clever algorithms for matching voters with their districts and elected representatives, but no one had checked to see whether civic tech developers were in need of a centralized hub. The startup was shuttered in 2019." He went on to group Brigade alongside "the 2020 Covid-19 Global Hackathon," as, "in the words of civic tech journalist and historian Micah Sifry, 'a big fat nothingburger.'"

=== Controversy ===
Parker was the president of Facebook in mid-2004. Recently, Facebook sold information on over 50 million Facebook users to Cambridge Analytica.

At the company's formation, Brigade Media also faced a racial controversy. When Brigade was only a few weeks old, the entire leadership division of the startup was white males. The company addressed the issues by filling in 12 additional positions and noting that women were also present in the organization.

== Results ==
When the ballot guide was introduced, about 67% of its users were millennials; this was an accomplishment as millennial participation in the 2014 midterm elections had declined. At the time of the ballot guide, the startup had 100,000 pledged candidates and 400,000 friends of candidates who also pledged.

The platform's data noted Donald Trump winning swing states before the polls in the 2016 United States presidential election. At this time, Brigade had 200,000 verified users. Within the vote pledges, 94.5% of Republicans pledged to vote for Republican nominee Trump, with 2.2% pledging with Democratic nominee Hillary Clinton. On the Democratic pledge side, only 55% pledged for Clinton while 40% of Democrats pledged for Trump.
