= Brit + Co =

Lifestyle brand (founded 2011)

- Company type: Private
- Industry: Internet commerce and media
- Founded: 2011
- Founder: Brit Morin
- Headquarters: San Francisco
- Services: Media company
- Website: brit.co

Brit + Co is a website and lifestyle brand targeted at women. The company was founded by Brit Morin in 2011.

== History ==
Brit + Co was founded in late 2011 by Brit Morin, who was CEO.

In January 2018, the company hired Jill Braff, a former general manager of Ellen Digital Ventures, as its new president. Jeff Jones, former Target CMO and Uber President, joined the company as an advisor in 2017.

In April 2019 it was announced that the company was laying off most of its staff as part of a reorganization. The company had exhausted all the capital it had raised, and as a result had to be restructured in bankruptcy.

In June 2020, Brit + Co launched women's business accelerator Selfmade to support women disproportionally impacted by the pandemic.

=== Funding & acquisitions ===
By 2017, it was reported that Brit + Co had received $45 million in venture capital funding from investors like Verizon Ventures and Marissa Mayer.

The company raised $1.25 million in initial seed funding in April 2012. The following year, it closed funding rounds with $6.3 million in Series A funding, led by Oak Investment Partners.

Led by Intel Capital, the company received $20 million in Series B funding in 2015, allowing them to make their first acquisition of a DIY app called Snapguide.

== Experiential ==
=== Re:Make ===
Launched in 2013, Re:Make was a conference and festival aimed at young women who want to be more creative in every aspect of their lives. More than 15,000 visitors attended Re:Make 2016.

=== Holiday House ===
The Brit + Co Holiday House was an annual pop-up event held in San Francisco for several years, offering creative activity classes, artisan products, and DIY and gifting stations. The 2016 Holiday House was sponsored primarily by method.
