= Shawn Fanning =

American computer programmer, entrepreneur, and angel investor

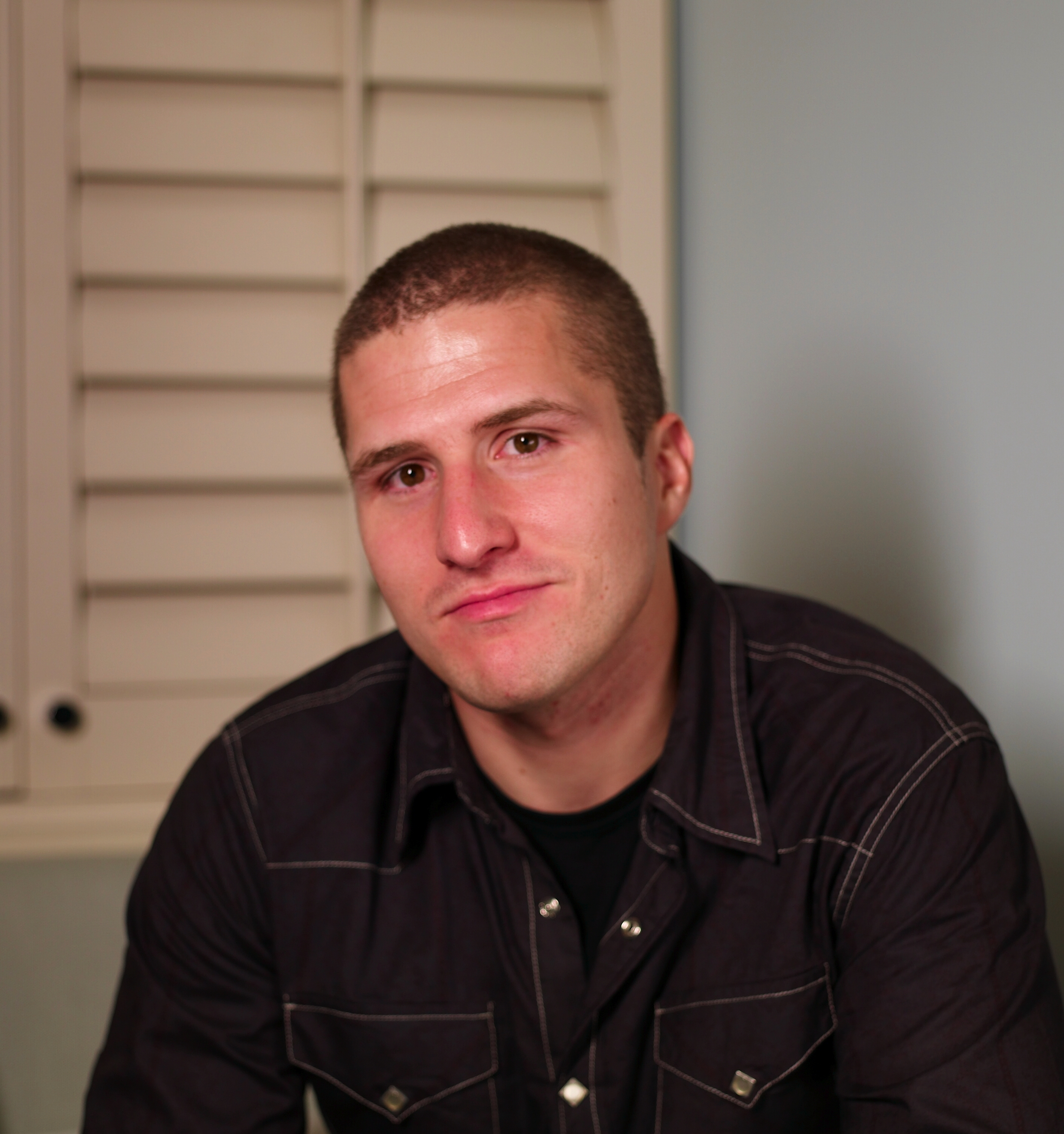
- Fanning in 2007
- Occupations: Computer programmer, entrepreneur, angel investor
- Known for: Co-founder and lead software engineer of Napster
- Notable work: Napster, Snocap, Rupture, Path

Shawn Fanning is an American computer programmer, entrepreneur, and angel investor. He developed Napster, one of the first popular peer-to-peer (P2P) file sharing platforms, in 1999. The popularity of Napster was widespread and Fanning was featured on the cover of Time magazine.

The site in its initial free P2P incarnation was shut down in 2001 after the company's unsuccessful appeal of court orders arising from its encouraging the illegal sharing of copyrighted material. A paid subscription version of the site followed, and was purchased by Rhapsody on December 1, 2011. Following his involvement with Napster, he joined, and invested in, a number of early-stage technology startup companies.

== Computer career ==
=== Napster ===
On June 1, 1999, Fanning released a preliminary beta program of Napster and soon, hundreds of college students at Northeastern University were trading music. Sean Parker was the co-founder. They got the name from Fanning's nickname "Nappy", in reference to his hair texture.

=== Snocap ===
In 2002, Fanning was named to the MIT Technology Review TR100 as one of the top 100 innovators in the world under the age of 35. In 2003, he opened a new company, Snocap, along with Jordan Mendelson (Napster's chief architect), and Ron Conway. The company aspired to be a legitimate marketplace for digital media. However, their partners and the public did not respond well. Customer support was poor, and technical issues were numerous. One of their primary partners, CD Baby, wrote a scathing account of their relationship. In late 2007, Snocap laid off 60% of its workforce. ValleyWag wrote an article that Fanning had long left Snocap and began to work on another venture, Rupture. The ValleyWag article stated that the failure was largely due to Snocap's CEO Rusty Rueff and that of former VP Engineering Dave Rowley, who "made a mess of engineering before he was fired". Snocap was looking to sell itself and fast. In 2008, they found a buyer: imeem acquired Snocap in a fire sale.

=== Rupture ===
The Rupture project was announced in 2007 with seed funding.

In December 2006, Fanning, along with Co-founder Jon Baudanza, developed Rupture, a social networking tool designed to handle the task of publishing gamers' individual profiles to a communal space and facilitating communication between World of Warcraft players. Rupture was later acquired by Electronic Arts for $30 million. Fanning's career at Electronic Arts was short-lived as a round of layoffs in November 2009 included him and his team at Rupture.

=== Path ===
A few months after Fanning was laid off from Electronic Arts, he started a new company called Path.com. In January 2010, Dave Morin announced he was leaving Facebook, where he was a Senior Platform Manager, to join Fanning and become CEO at Path.

=== Airtime ===
In 2011 Fanning reunited with Napster cofounder Sean Parker to found Airtime.com. Some of the investors were Ron Conway, Michael Arrington, and Ashton Kutcher. Fanning is CEO and Parker as executive chairman.

Airtime launched in June 2012 at a disastrous public event where Parker and Fanning paid huge amounts of money to have celebrities present but the product repeatedly crashed and ultimately failed to work. Greg Sandoval of CNET commented, "To launch his new start-up, Sean Parker should have spent less of his billions on celebrity guests and more of it on fixing his technology."

=== Helium Systems ===
In 2013 Fanning founded Helium Systems together with Amir Haleem, and Sean Carey. In December 2014, the company announced that it had raised $16 million in funding led by Khosla Ventures, with participation from FirstMark Capital, Digital Garage, Marc Benioff, SV Angel, and Slow Ventures among others.

== In popular culture ==
In 2000, Fanning appeared as a presenter at the MTV Video Music Awards. He appeared wearing a Metallica T-shirt as the Metallica v. Napster, Inc. lawsuit had been filed a few months prior. "For Whom the Bell Tolls" played in the background. When asked where he got the shirt, Fanning stated, "a friend of mine shared it with me." Lars Ulrich was sitting in the audience, and his reaction was shown as feigned boredom. In October 2000, Fanning was featured on the cover of Time magazine.

Fanning had a cameo appearance as himself in the 2003 film The Italian Job. In the film, Seth Green's character Lyle accused Fanning of stealing Napster from him while he was taking a nap in their Northeastern University dorm room. Although other characters see this as mere bragging, a scene shows Fanning in fact creeping over Lyle's sleeping body and stealing a 3 1/2-inch (89 mm) floppy disk. In early 2008, Fanning appeared in a Volkswagen commercial directed by Roman Coppola, in which he poked fun at his file-sharing past. Fanning and Napster were the subject of Alex Winter's documentary Downloaded in 2013.
