= Votizen =

- Industry: Software
- Founded: 2009
- Defunct: 2013
- Fate: Acquired by Causes, then Brigade Media
- Headquarters: Mountain View, California
- Key people: David Binetti; Jason Putorti; Matt Snider (co-founders)
- Products: Consumer Technology Company
- Revenue: N/A
- Website: http://votizen.com

Votizen was a consumer technology company that developed an online network of voters in the United States. Based in Mountain View, California, the site allowed its members, which it called "Votizens", to learn about issues and elections, and take collective action with other committed voters through social media. Votizen verified that each voice belongs to a real voter in the real world. As of 2012, Votizen had mapped out over a million connections between voters on Votizen. It was acquired by activism platform Causes in 2013, which was then later acquired by Brigade Media in 2014.

== History ==
Votizen was founded by David Binetti, Jason Putorti, and Matt Snider in March 2010. The catalyst for Votizen's growth sprung from the success of a Twitter campaign in 2010 in support of the Startup Visa, where thousands of people tweeted their support of the bill and Votizen delivered the messages to the appropriate people. In September 2010 Votizen announced it had raised $1.5 million in funding led by Peter Thiel and Sean Parker of Founders Fund with participating investors including 500 Startups, David Cowan, Keith Rabois, Ron Conway, Mark Goines, Founder Collective, Felicis Ventures, PivotNorth, Steve Blank, Eric Ries, Shervin Pishevar, and Tom Shields.

On September 14, 2011, Votizen conducted the first "virtual" precinct walk with San Franciscans for Jobs and Good Government, a committee supporting San Francisco mayoral candidate Ed Lee. Votizen was attempting to bring the door-to-door walking in support of candidates to the 21st century by allowing registered voters to express their support for Ed Lee and ask their friends to pledge to vote for Ed Lee. Votizen plans to have their virtual precinct walks boost voter participation and play a big role in the 2012 elections. Randi Zuckerberg, former marketing director at Facebook, spoke about Votizen's virtual precinct walk and believed "The virtual precinct walk has the potential to turn conventional campaigning on its head and inspire more people to vote."

On September 27, 2011, Votizen won every award in the Social Media Disruptathon at the Washington Post Building in Washington DC. Votizen won in the categories of best presentation, uniqueness, design, most disruptive potential, most liked, and best in show. Votizen competed against a field of nineteen other startups.

In February 2012, Votizen announced a $750,000 convertible funding round led by Sean Parker with celebrity investors including Ashton Kutcher, Guy Oseary, and Lady Gaga's manager Troy Carter investing as well. On March 12, 2012, at the South by Southwest Festival in Austin, TX; Al Gore and Votizen investor Sean Parker spoke about the internet's effect on politics and Votizen's potential role in politics with Gore saying "democracy has been hacked" by money and special interests, and tools such as Votizen can provide the fix.

On January 10, 2013, Votizen was acquired by Causes, an online civic engagement platform founded by Sean Parker.

== Leveraging Social Media ==
Sean Parker, co-founder of Napster and Facebook's founding president, was an investor in Votizen and a director on the board of the company. Parker, talking during the 2011 Techonomy conference said, "Politics for me is the most obvious area [to be disrupted by the Web]". Parker, who said he's “not a huge believer in direct democracy,” was exploring ways to leverage social media to influence politics with investments such as Votizen. His prediction was that "taking money out of politics with campaigns is possible through social media." with services like Votizen.
