= Aditya Agarwal =

American software engineer and investor

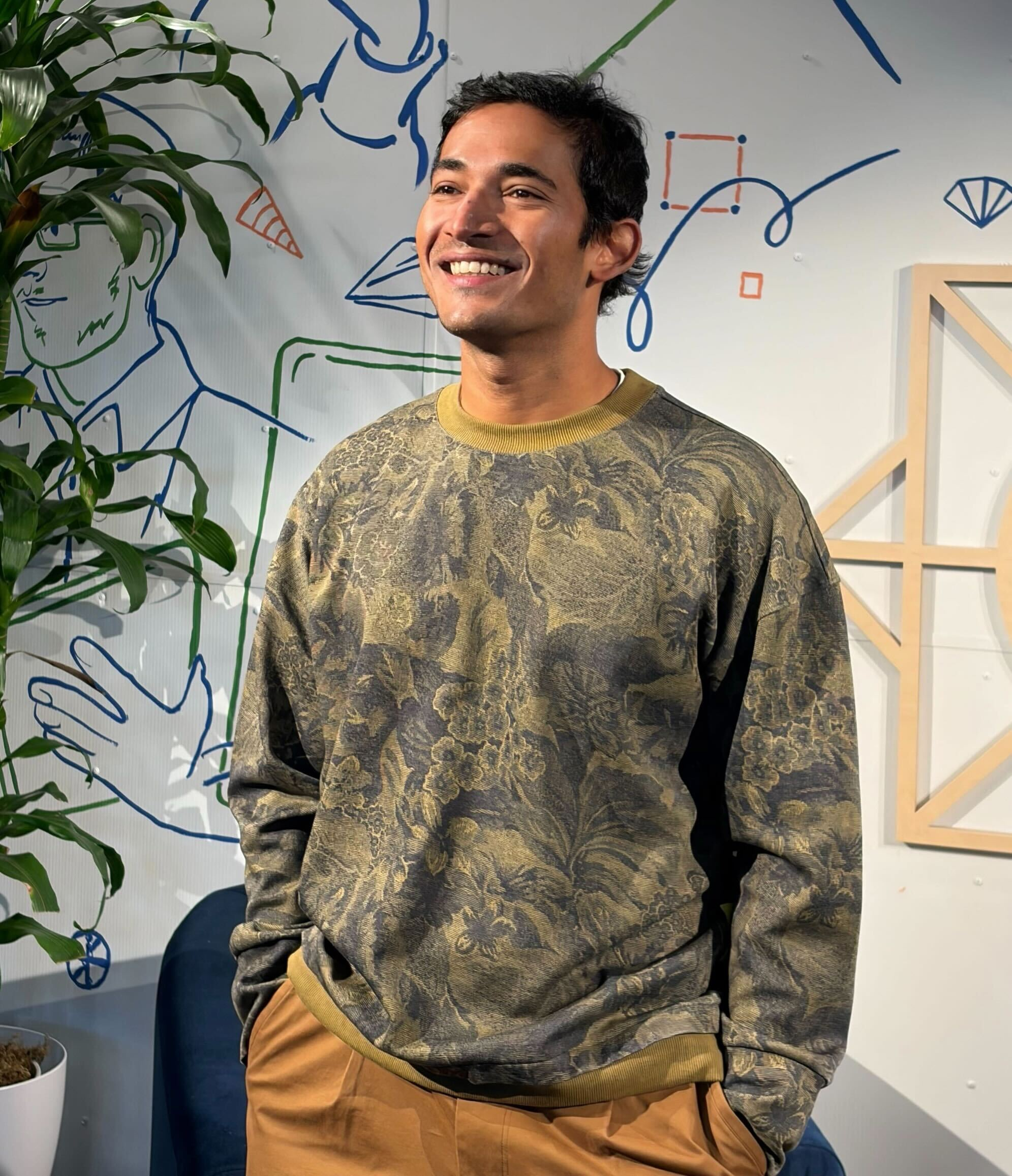
- Born: 1982 (age 43–44); India
- Education: Carnegie Mellon University (BS, MS)
- Occupations: Software engineer, investor
- Employer: South Park Commons
- Known for: Early engineer at Facebook, former CTO of Dropbox, co-founder of FWD.us
- Spouse: Ruchi Sanghvi (m. 2010)

Aditya Agarwal (born 1982) is an Indian-American software engineer and investor. He is a general partner at the venture capital fund South Park Commons. Agarwal was previously the Chief Technology Officer (CTO) of Dropbox and an early engineer at Facebook, where he served as the first Director of Product Engineering.

== Education ==
Agarwal attended Carnegie Mellon University (CMU) in Pittsburgh, Pennsylvania, where he earned both a Bachelor's and Master's degree in Computer Science.

== Career ==
=== Facebook ===
Agarwal joined Facebook as a software engineer in 2005. He was one of the company's first engineers and helped build the initial search engine for the platform. He eventually became the company's first Director of Product Engineering, where he oversaw engineering for products including Search.

=== Cove and Dropbox ===
Agarwal co-founded Cove, a collaboration software company, with Ruchi Sanghvi. In February 2012, Dropbox acquired Cove, and Agarwal joined Dropbox as Vice President of Engineering.

In October 2016, Agarwal was appointed Chief Technology Officer (CTO) of Dropbox, succeeding co-founder Arash Ferdowsi. As CTO, he was responsible for the company's engineering, product, and technical operations. He left Dropbox in 2017.

=== Investing ===
Agarwal is a partner at South Park Commons, a venture capital fund and technologist community founded by Ruchi Sanghvi.

He has served on the board of directors of Flipkart, an Indian e-commerce company, joining as an independent director in 2014.

== Philanthropy and affiliations ==
In 2013, Agarwal was a founding contributor to FWD.us, a 501(c)(4) lobbying group focused on immigration reform and education in the United States.

He has served on the board of trustees for the Anita Borg Institute for Women and Technology and on the advisory board for the School of Computer Science at Carnegie Mellon University.

Agarwal is a co-author of The Holloway Guide to Technical Recruiting and Hiring (2020), a reference book on engineering recruitment.

== Personal life ==
Agarwal is married to Ruchi Sanghvi, a computer engineer and founder of South Park Commons. They met while studying at Carnegie Mellon University and later worked together at Facebook and Dropbox. They married in 2010.
