= Stamen Design =

Data visualization design studio

- Company type: Private
- Industry: Data visualization, Cartography, Interaction design, Software engineering, Web design
- Founded: January 1, 2001
- Founder: Eric Rodenbeck
- Headquarters: San Francisco, United States
- Area served: Worldwide
- Number of employees: 24
- Website: www.stamen.com

Stamen is a data visualization design studio based in San Francisco, California. Its clients include National Geographic, Facebook and The Dalai Lama.

== History ==
Stamen was founded in 2001 by Eric Rodenbeck. In 2003, Michal Migurski joined Stamen as a partner, remaining until 2013. In 2006, Shawn Allen became the studio's third partner, remaining until 2014. In 2014, writer and UCLA professor Jon Allan Christensen joined Stamen as a partner and strategic advisor.

== Projects ==
In 2017 Stamen was commissioned by the Victoria and Albert Museum to design and develop Big Glass Microphone, an interactive, online visualization of the acoustic vibrations picked up by a fiber-optic cable buried beneath a road at Stanford University.

In 2016 Stamen designed an Atlas of Human Emotions for Paul Ekman and The Dalai Lama. The New York Times quoted Paul Ekman as saying “It is a visualization for what we think has been learned from scientific studies. It's a transformative process, a work of explanation.”

In 2015 Stamen partnered with Hipcamp and GreenInfo Network to develop CaliParks, a bilingual, statewide, parks search engine that brings together park boundary and management data in California with social media content from Instagram, Flickr, Twitter, and Foursquare.

Stamen is the developer and maintainer of Field Papers, an open source tool for humanitarian mapping that lets users annotate OpenStreetMap in areas without internet connectivity. Field Papers was supported by grants from USAID and the Hewlett Foundation in conjunction with the Humanitarian OpenStreetMap Team.

In 2014 Stamen designed new default basemaps for CartoDB, using OpenStreetMap data. These map tiles are available for unlimited use under the Creative Commons Attribution license.

== Awards and grants ==
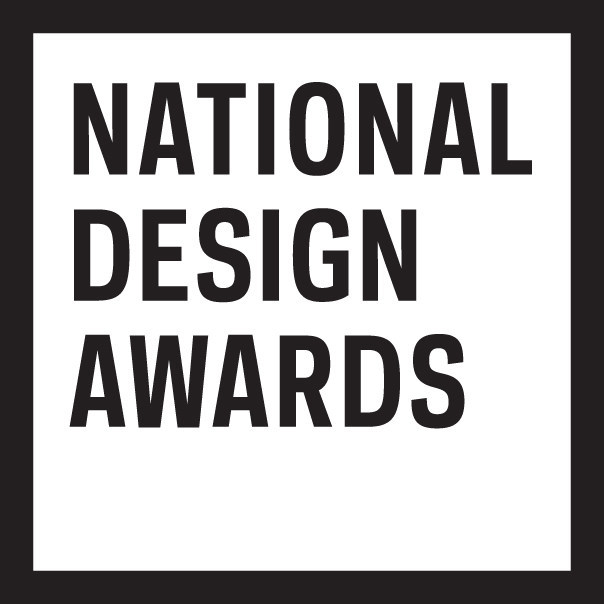
National Design Awards

In 2017 Stamen won the National Design Award for Interaction Design, presented by Cooper-Hewitt, Smithsonian Design Museum.

At the Information is Beautiful Awards in 2012, Stamen won the Gold Award for Data Journalism and the Most Beautiful award for its "Home & Away" project for CNN. In that year Stamen also won the Information is Beautiful "Best Studio" prize.

In 2010, Stamen was awarded a US$400,000 grant from the Knight Foundation to create a series of freely-available web maps based on OpenStreetMap data. The resulting map tiles (called Toner, Watercolor, and Terrain) are available for unlimited use under the Creative Commons Attribution license and are compatible with open source mapping libraries such as Leaflet and OpenLayers. The service is widely used in mapping projects around the world. In 2021, "Watercolor" joined the Cooper Hewitt, Smithsonian Design Museum collection, becoming the first live website to do so.

== Notable alumni ==
- Rachel Binx
- Nathaniel Vaughn Kelso
- George Oates

== See also ==
- Web mapping
- Data visualization
- OpenStreetMap
- CartoDB
- Mapbox
