= Overseas China Education Foundation =

- Founded: October 1992; El Cerrito, California, US
- Founder: Wenyuan Shi
- Type: Educational Charity, 501(c)(3)
- Tax ID no.: 76-0680540
- Purpose: Rural Education in China
- Location: Houston, Texas, US
- Region served: China
- Key people: Tina Miao, President
- Expenses: $272,138.76 (2011)
- Endowment: $382,313.57 (2011)
- Volunteers: > 3,000
- Website: www.ocef.org
- Formerly called: SOS China Education Fund

Overseas China Education Foundation (OCEF) is an independent, non-political, non-religious and non-profit charity organization, founded in October 1992 by a group of Chinese students and scholars in California. Formerly known as SOS China Education Fund (SOSCEF), OCEF changed to its current name and was registered in Texas in April 2001 as a 501(c)(3) non-profit organization. OCEF's sole mission is to help underprivileged children in impoverished rural areas of China receive education and improve the quality of education in rural China.

== Overview ==
OCEF is headquartered in Houston, Texas and has local chapters in many cities across the U.S., including Boston, Chicago, Dallas, Houston, New York, San Diego, San Francisco, and UIUC.

OCEF raises funds primarily via donations from individuals, corporations and foundations in the U.S., then distributes them directly to the students, teachers and schools in rural China, through the volunteers in China (run by OCEF's China Affairs group), without any interference by governments or other organizations. The distribution process is completely transparent and discussed in details on OCEF's BBS forum.

OCEF is operated predominantly by unpaid volunteers, with operational costs being 3.4% of annual donation receipts in 2011.

- Raised over $3 million donations
- Distributed over RMB 14 million across 27 provinces in China
- Sponsored 41,610 students and teachers
- Built 412 libraries
- Donated 373,019 books

In 2012, OCEF celebrated its 20th anniversary through a series of events around the world, in Beijing, New York, Chicago, San Francisco, and the main event on November 4, 2012, in Houston.

== OCEF Programs ==
OCEF offers a variety of funding programs across over 20 provinces in rural China and has developed comprehensive operational procedures that ensure all OCEF funds are distributed diligently and transparently.

- Comprehensive Support Program
- Financial Aid Program
- High School Scholarship Program
- Teacher Aid Program
- Library Program
- School Building Program

OCEF conducts site-visits to inspect OCEF sponsored programs, during which the inspectors examine the status of aid recipients, confirm the proper use of all aid money, and verify that the schools have followed OCEF policies in the pre-screening of aid applicants and in the disbursement of aid. The majority of the local funding programs are inspected every other year.

== Publications ==
OCEF regularly publishes reports, journals, newsflashes, etc. for its supported students, donors, members and volunteers.

== Awards and Prizes ==
- In April 2005, OCEF received Top 10 Reading Advocate Award from the Library Society of China.
- In November 2009, OCEF received the $50,000 grand prize in the America's Giving Challenge sponsored by the Case Foundation, Parade magazine and the Facebook Causes application, for the most donations received over the 30-day period. OCEF received 13,772 donations and raised $156,637 in addition to the $50,000 award money.
- In December 2009, OCEF received a $25,000 prize in the Chase Community Giving Contest, following Facebook users' voting.
- In May 2010, Socialbrite named OCEF second place in its list of top ten most successful NGOs at Causes.
