= Sean Parker =

American entrepreneur and philanthropist (born 1979)

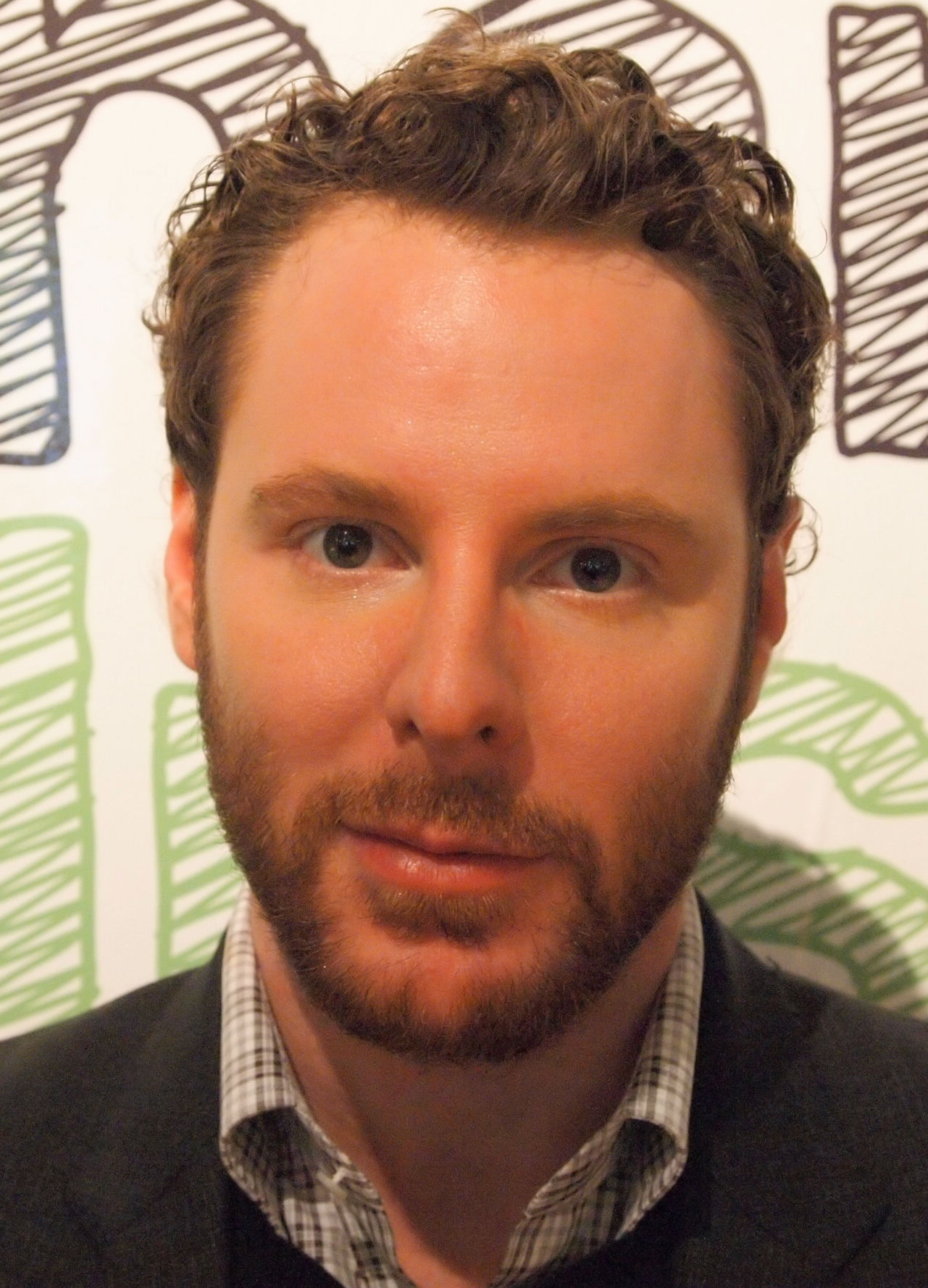
- Parker in 2011
- Born: December 3, 1979 (age 46); Herndon, Virginia, U.S.
- Occupations: Entrepreneur, investor
- Known for: Managing Partner at The Founders Fund; Co-founder of Plaxo, Napster, Airtime, and Causes; President of Facebook; Chairman of the Parker Foundation
- Spouse: Alexandra Lenas (m. 2013)
- Children: 2

Sean Parker (born December 3, 1979) is an American entrepreneur and philanthropist, most notable for co-founding the file-sharing computer service Napster, and was the first president of the social networking website Facebook. He also co-founded Plaxo, Causes, Airtime.com, and Brigade, an online platform for civic engagement. He is the founder and chairman of the Parker Foundation, which focuses on life sciences, global public health, and civic engagement. According to Forbes, as of May 2025, Parker's estimated net worth stood at US$3.0 billion, placing him in the top 1,250 richest individuals in the world.

== Early life ==
Parker was born in Herndon, Virginia, to Diane Parker, a TV advertising broker, and Bruce Parker, a U.S. government oceanographer and chief scientist at NOAA. When Parker was seven, his father taught him how to program on an Atari 800. Parker's father, who put his family before his entrepreneurial dreams, told Parker, "if you are going to take risks, take them early before you have a family." In his teens, Parker's hobbies were hacking and programming. One night, while hacking into the network of a Fortune 500 company, Parker was unable to log out after his father confiscated his computer keyboard. Because his IP address was exposed, FBI agents tracked down the 16-year-old. Since Parker was under 18, he was sentenced to community service.

== Education ==
Parker attended Oakton High School in Fairfax County, Virginia for two years before transferring to Chantilly High School in 1996 for his junior and senior years. While there, Parker wrote a letter to the school administration and persuaded them to count the time he spent coding in the computer lab as a foreign language class. Consequently, towards the end of Parker's senior year at Chantilly, he was mostly writing code and starting companies. He graduated in 1998. While still in high school, he interned for Mark Pincus (who would later become the CEO of Zynga) at Pincus's Washington, DC startup FreeLoader. He won the Virginia state computer science fair for developing a web crawler, and was recruited by the CIA. By his senior year of high school, Parker was earning more than $80,000 a year through various projects, enough to convince his parents to allow him to skip college and pursue a career as an entrepreneur.

In his childhood, Parker was an avid reader, which was the beginning of his lifelong autodidacticism. Several media profiles refer to Parker as a genius. He considers his time at Napster to be his college education, calling it "Napster University", since he became well-versed in intellectual property law, corporate finance, and entrepreneurship.

== Ventures ==
=== Napster ===
When Parker was 15, he met 14-year-old Shawn Fanning over the Internet, where the pair bonded over topics such as programming, theoretical physics, and hacking. A few years later, Parker and Fanning, a student at Northeastern University, cofounded Napster, a free file-sharing service for music. Parker raised the initial $50,000, and they launched Napster in June 1999. Within a year, the service had tens of millions of users. Napster was opposed by recording labels, the Recording Industry Association of America, and the heavy metal band Metallica, among others. Lawsuits by various industry associations eventually shut down the service. Napster has been called the fastest-growing business of all time, is credited with revolutionizing the music industry, and is considered by some to be a precursor to iTunes.

=== Plaxo ===
In November 2002, Parker launched Plaxo, an online address book and social networking service that integrated with Microsoft Outlook. Plaxo was an early social networking tool, which later influenced the growth of companies LinkedIn, Zynga, and Facebook. Plaxo was one of the first products to build virality into its launch, and that earned it 20 million users. Two years after founding Plaxo, Parker was ousted by the company's financiers, Sequoia Capital and Ram Shriram, in an acrimonious exit that reportedly involved the investors hiring private investigators to follow him.

=== Facebook ===
In 2004, Parker saw a site called "The Facebook" on the computer of his roommate's girlfriend, who was a student at Stanford. Parker had experience in the social networking industry as an early advisor to Friendster and its founder, Jonathan Abrams, for which he was given a small amount of stock in 2003. Parker met with Mark Zuckerberg and Eduardo Saverin, and a few months later joined the five-month-old company as its president. According to Peter Thiel, Parker was the first to see potential in the company to be "really big", and that "if Mark ever had any second thoughts, Sean was the one who cut that off".

As president, Parker brought on Thiel as Facebook's first investor. In the initial round of funding, he negotiated for Zuckerberg to retain three of Facebook's five board seats, which gave Zuckerberg control of the company and allowed Facebook the freedom to remain a private company. Additionally, Parker is said to have championed Facebook's clean user interface and developed its photo-sharing function. Zuckerberg notes that "Sean was pivotal in helping Facebook transform from a college project into a real company."

During a party in 2005, police entered and searched a vacation home Parker was renting and found cocaine. Parker was arrested on suspicion of drug possession but was not charged. This event caused Facebook investors to pressure Parker into resigning as president. However, after stepping down, Parker continued to remain involved with Facebook's growth, and met regularly with Zuckerberg. The event was later dramatized in the movie The Social Network.

In 2017, during an interview with Axios, Parker expressed concerns about the role of Facebook in society, saying that it "exploit[s] a vulnerability in human psychology" as it creates a "social-validation feedback loop". Parker stated that he was "something of a conscientious objector" to using social media.

=== Founders Fund ===
In 2006, Parker became a managing partner at Founders Fund, a San Francisco-based venture-capital fund founded by Peter Thiel. Founders Fund is focused on investing in early-stage companies, has $500 million in aggregate capital, and has invested in Quantcast, Path, and Knewton. Parker was given carte blanche by Thiel when finding investments. In 2014, Parker stepped down from his role at Founders Fund to focus on other projects. Parker has also hosted The TechFellow Awards, a partnership between TechCrunch and Founders Fund that annually gives 20 entrepreneurs $100,000 each to invest in startups.

=== Spotify ===
While working at Founders Fund, Parker had been looking to invest in a company that could further Napster's music-sharing mission legally. In 2009, a friend showed him Spotify, a Swedish music-streaming service, and Parker sent an email to Spotify's founder Daniel Ek. The pair traded emails, and in 2010 Parker invested US$15 million in Spotify. Parker, who was on Spotify's board until 2017, negotiated with Warner and Universal on Spotify's behalf, and in July 2011, Spotify announced its U.S. launch. At Facebook's f8 conference that year, Parker announced a partnership between Facebook and Spotify, which allowed users to share their Spotify playlists on their Facebook profiles.

=== Brigade Media ===
In April 2014, Parker announced his backing of a new initiative called Brigade, an online platform for civic engagement to "combat a lack of political engagement and interest in all levels of government across America." Parker is the Executive Chairman of Brigade. The initial round of funding was $9.3 million from Parker, with additional sums from other investors. In 2014, Brigade acquired Causes, an online platform for social impact and political activism. Causes had in 2013 acquired Votizen, a political advocacy startup. Parker and The Founders Fund were a part of Votizen's $1.5 million funding round in 2010, and Parker was on the board of directors. He has stated, "Politics for me is the most obvious area [to be disrupted by the Web]."

== Philanthropy ==
Since 2005, Parker has been an active donor to cancer research, global public health and civic engagement. In 2012, he pledged a $5 million grant to Stand Up to Cancer and the Cancer Research Institute to create the Immunotherapy Dream Team, uniting laboratory and clinical efforts that will lead to the immunological treatment, control and prevention of cancer. In December 2014, Parker pledged $24 million to create the Sean N. Parker Center for Allergy Research at Stanford. In 2015, he made a $4.5 million grant to support the Malaria Elimination Initiative at the University of California San Francisco's Global Health Group, and a $10 million grant to create the Sean N. Parker Autoimmune Research Laboratory at UCSF.

Parker is an active supporter of groups including Code for America, Stand Up To Cancer, the Cancer Research Institute, Malaria No More, the Clinton Foundation, ONE, and the "charity: water" campaign.

In 2007, Parker founded Causes, originally one of the earliest Facebook applications, as a philanthropic service that uses social media to connect charities with their supporters and potential donors and then communicates that connection to the user's network of friends. By 2013, 186 million people had joined Causes, donating over $50 million to 60,000 non-profits.

=== Parker Foundation ===
In June 2015, Parker announced a $600 million contribution to launch the Parker Foundation, which focuses on three areas - life sciences, global public health, and civic engagement. It takes an interdisciplinary approach to large-scale challenges, combining insight, capital, science and technology, organization building, and public policy.

=== Parker Institute for Cancer Immunotherapy ===
Parker donated $250 million to create the Parker Institute for Cancer Immunotherapy, in April 2016. The funds initially went to over 300 scientists at 40 laboratories, in six institutions.

Starting in 2016, the Parker Institute for Cancer Immunotherapy scientists funded a clinical trial to test the next wave of cancer-fighting T-cells engineered using the CRISPR gene-editing technology. The trial was the first in the United States to test CRISPR-modified cells in humans. The trial is led by the University of Pennsylvania and is also conducted at University of California, San Francisco and the University of Texas MD Anderson Cancer Center.

In November 2017, Science published a study from Parker Institute researchers at MD Anderson Cancer Center showing that melanoma patients who have specific types of bacteria and greater microbial diversity in their gut microbiome responded better to an anti-PD-1 checkpoint inhibitor versus those with less diversity. Based on this work, the Parker Institute is collaborating with MD Anderson and industry partner Seres Therapeutics to launch a microbiome-cancer immunotherapy clinical trial for advanced melanoma patients.

=== Board memberships ===
Parker is on the boards of these nonprofits:

- Obama Foundation
- Global Citizen
- Parker Institute for Cancer Immunotherapy
- Parker Foundation
- Museum of Contemporary Art, Los Angeles

=== Awards ===
In February 2015, Parker was ranked number five on the Chronicle of Philanthropy's 2014 Philanthropy 50 list. In August 2018, Parker was nominated as a Wired "Icon" along with Alex Marson for his research in DNA programming and genome editing in the fight against cancer. He's also been named one of Town and Country's Top 50 Philanthropists and was named in Time's Healthcare 50 for his work in connecting cancer research. In 2016, he was given the Pontifical Key Philanthropy Award by Cardinal Gianfranco Ravasi at the Vatican for his cancer work.

== Political donations and activism ==
Parker has made substantial donations to both sides of U.S. party politics; his allegedly "nonpartisan" approach favors contributions to "elected officials who have shown themselves willing to work across the aisle". He favored Democrats and progressive causes such as campaign finance reform and gun control; he has spoken out in favor of higher taxes, particularly for the "wealthy and super wealthy", and in favor of higher capital-gains taxes. Parker has also supported middle-of-the-road Republican candidates and super PACs, favoring "economically moderate" conservatives and candidates with a demonstrated interest in compromise and deal-making. In Washington, DC, he has met with Republican lawmakers about ways of encouraging economic investment in struggling areas of the country. He has also supported cannabis law reform and in 2010, following the example of donations by Facebook co-founder Dustin Moskovitz (totaling $70,000) donated $100,000 to the 2010 California Proposition 19 campaign to legalize marijuana in that state and $400,000 to the Democratic Party backed 2016 California Proposition 63 campaign to require background checks for all ammunition purchases. Parker will donate $250 million to launch a new institute aimed at developing more effective cancer treatments by fostering collaboration among leading researchers in the field. For the 2016 presidential election, Parker created a social ballot guide for voters to help each other pledge to vote.

Parker was also a driving force behind the Opportunity Zones provision in the Tax Cuts and Jobs Act of 2017, which are designed to incentivize investments in struggling American communities. In 2015, the Economic Innovation Group, which Parker co-founded, published a whitepaper on the idea of opportunity zones, and in 2017, a bill passing them into law was shepherded by a bipartisan coalition involving Senator Cory Booker and Senator Tim Scott.

== In popular culture ==
Parker was portrayed by Justin Timberlake in the 2010 film The Social Network. The movie is an account of Facebook's founding and early days. The similarities between the dubious legality of file sharing by Napster and the sharing of personal information by Facebook (now Meta) are discussed.

Although Parker praised David Fincher as a director, many have remarked on the differences between Parker and his portrayal by Timberlake. Former Facebook growth chief Chamath Palihapitiya noted that Parker is "really the exact opposite of his portrayal in the film". Parker called the character a "morally reprehensible human being", although he noted, "it's hard to complain about being played by a sex symbol". Additionally, Parker took issue with the movie's version of Eduardo Saverin's exit from Facebook as it paralleled his own exit from Plaxo.

In 2011, Parker was a guest on Late Night with Jimmy Fallon, featured on the cover of the Forbes 400 issue, and was profiled in Vanity Fair.

In 2020, Parker appeared in The Social Dilemma.

== Personal life ==
In 2011, Parker became engaged to Alexandra Lenas, a singer-songwriter, and they were married in 2013. They have a daughter and a son.

=== Big Sur wedding ===
On June 1, 2013, Parker married Alexandra Lenas in Big Sur, California, in a wedding at which every guest was given a The Lord of the Rings–style costume. The wedding purportedly cost $10 million to stage, although Parker describes this estimate as "WAY off base".

The wedding was the subject of an article in The Atlantic alleging environmental damage to the redwood forest, to which Parker responded by highlighting his cooperation with the Save the Redwoods League throughout. A required permit was not obtained. In addition, the venue from which he hired the space was not permitted to be closed to the public. A California Coastal Commission spokesperson said "Mr Parker, in essence, leased an ongoing Coastal Act violation when he leased the campground." As part of the settlement with the commission, Parker gave $2.5 million and created a beach-mapping app. Former Coastal Commissioner Assemblyman Mark Stone said, "To be able to put money back into the same community that cares so much about coastal resources is a very positive thing."
