= Jon Christensen (journalist) =

American historian

Jon Allan Christensen (born 1960) is an American freelance journalist with a focus of writing about California, from his Venice home in coastal Los Angeles County. He is an Adjunct Assistant Professor at the UCLA Institute of the Environment and Sustainability, where he periodically teaches a class, Environmental journalism, for undergraduate Environmental Science majors at UCLA. In January 2020 he authored an op-ed opinion piece in the Los Angeles Times about bulldozing the Ballona Wetlands, which would harm endangered native wildlife and rare native wildflowers, as well as removing living soil.

== Biography ==
Christensen was the Executive Director at the Bill Lane Center for the American West and a doctoral student at Stanford University, then quit his PhD History program, when he moved south to Los Angeles County in 2012, to join the staff of the UCLA Institute of the Environment and Sustainability. At UCLA he was the editor of Boom: A Journal of California from 2013 to 2016. He is a freelance journalist whose work has appeared in major newspapers and in at least one major magazine, including The New York Times, the San Francisco Chronicle, and The New Yorker.

In 2014, Christensen joined Stamen Design, a data visualization and cartography studio in San Francisco, as a partner in Los Angeles.
