= New American Economy =

Immigration research organization based in New York City

New American Economy (NAE) is a national, nonprofit, bipartisan immigration research and advocacy organization based in New York City. NAE's stated mission is to fight for smart federal, state, and local immigration policies, and change the narrative around immigration in America by producing research on the economic impact of immigrants, organizing at the grassroots level, partnering with state and local policymakers, and spearheading cultural initiatives and events. NAE was originally founded in 2010 by New York City mayor Michael Bloomberg, and has grown into a coalition of business, civic, and cultural leaders in all 50 states. The NAE merged into the American Immigration Council.

== Data and research ==
New American Economy advocates for immigration reform through the use of data and personal narrative emphasizing the impact immigrants make on America in a variety of fields. Including entrepreneurship, innovation, educational and economic success, cultural contributions, and community-building, NAE highlights the benefits of increased immigration both nationally and in states and communities across the country. NAE also partakes in coalition-building and mobilization to ensure all voices are heard.

New American Economy annually updates its data interactive Map the Impact, which provides detailed data on the contributions immigrants make across states, cities, counties, congressional districts, and nationally. Through its Cities Index project, NAE also releases research on how well the top 100 major U.S. metro areas integrate immigrants across a wide range of policy and socio-economic measures.

In 2017, NAE partnered with the Great Lakes Metro Chambers Coalition to release New Americans and a New Direction: The Role of Immigrants in Reviving the Great Lakes Region, a report on the ways immigrants have helped revitalize Rust Belt cities.

In 2011, NAE's inaugural report found that more than 40 percent of Fortune 500 companies were founded by immigrants or the children of immigrants. In addition to entrepreneurship rates, NAE produces original research highlighting immigrant contributions in sectors including health care, housing, technology and farming, among others.

== Policy advocacy ==
NAE has led coalition-building efforts among business leaders, faith leaders, Hispanic leaders, and more, and has worked with local leaders in more than 100 districts across 33 states who have staged public events and press conferences and have recruited local leaders to pen opinion editorials advocating for certain pieces of legislation.

In 2017, New American Economy partnered with Douglas Holtz-Eakin of the American Action Forum to publish a pro-immigration open letter signed by 1,470 economists, including six Nobel laureates.

That same year, in response to the Trump administration's attempts to rescind Deferred Action for Childhood Arrivals, NAE launched the iMarch for Immigration, a campaign to push for a path to legal status and citizenship for Dreamers led by a coalition of more than 100 partner associations, with supporters and stories from every U.S. congressional district. The iMarch included on-the-ground events in every state and a campaign hub inside the U.S. Capitol Building. It was covered in more than 100 media outlets, reached more than 4.5 million people on social media, and received support from celebrities and politicians.

In 2014, NAE teamed up with leaders from grassroots conservative groups and the Tea Party Express to commission a poll. The poll found that despite the polarized rhetoric in the national debate, a majority of self identified Tea Party voters supported Congress taking action to pass immigration reform.

== State and local initiatives ==
The NAE State and Local team is active in more than 75 communities across the country in both liberal and conservative states. The team has worked with policymakers, business and civic leaders to promote policies and programs in support of immigration. New American Economy is part of a growing movement whose efforts have resulted in 38 municipal and nine state-wide offices or task forces dedicated to immigrant inclusion; 30 local strategic plans for immigrant integration; tuition equity policies in 31 states; and state Seals of Biliteracy in 37 states plus Washington, DC.

NAE also partners with Welcoming America to offer the Gateways for Growth Challenge, an opportunity for local government, chambers of commerce, and non-profit organizations to jointly apply for tailored research, direct technical assistance, and matching grants to support their strategic planning processes. NAE also offers research, technical assistance, and strategic advice to chambers of commerce across the U.S. on issues of immigration, immigrant integration, and economic development as part of their Global Talent Chamber Network.

== Cultural initiatives ==
In September 2019, NAE launched the first New American Festival in New York City, a first-of-its-kind two-day event to celebrate immigrant contributions to American comedy, art, food, film, fashion, and more. The festival was held at NeueHouse, and headliners included sex therapist Dr. Ruth Westheimer (Dr. Ruth), Hasan Minhaj, chef Marcus Samuelsson, writer Aminatou Sow, author Min Jin Lee, and comedian Ronny Chieng. After launching in New York City, NAE brought the New American Festival to Boston, Kansas City, Nashville, Houston, Oakland, and Detroit.

Earlier in the year, NAE partnered with the American University School of Public Affairs and CuriosityConnects.us to launch Looking for America, a dialogue and art initiative exploring immigration and American identity in different communities across America. Looking for America exhibitions and dinners have been staged in Detroit, Salt Lake City, Anchorage, Sioux City, El Paso, and Northwest Arkansas.

== See also ==
- FWD.us
