= Ruchi Sanghvi =

Indian-American computer engineer and businesswoman

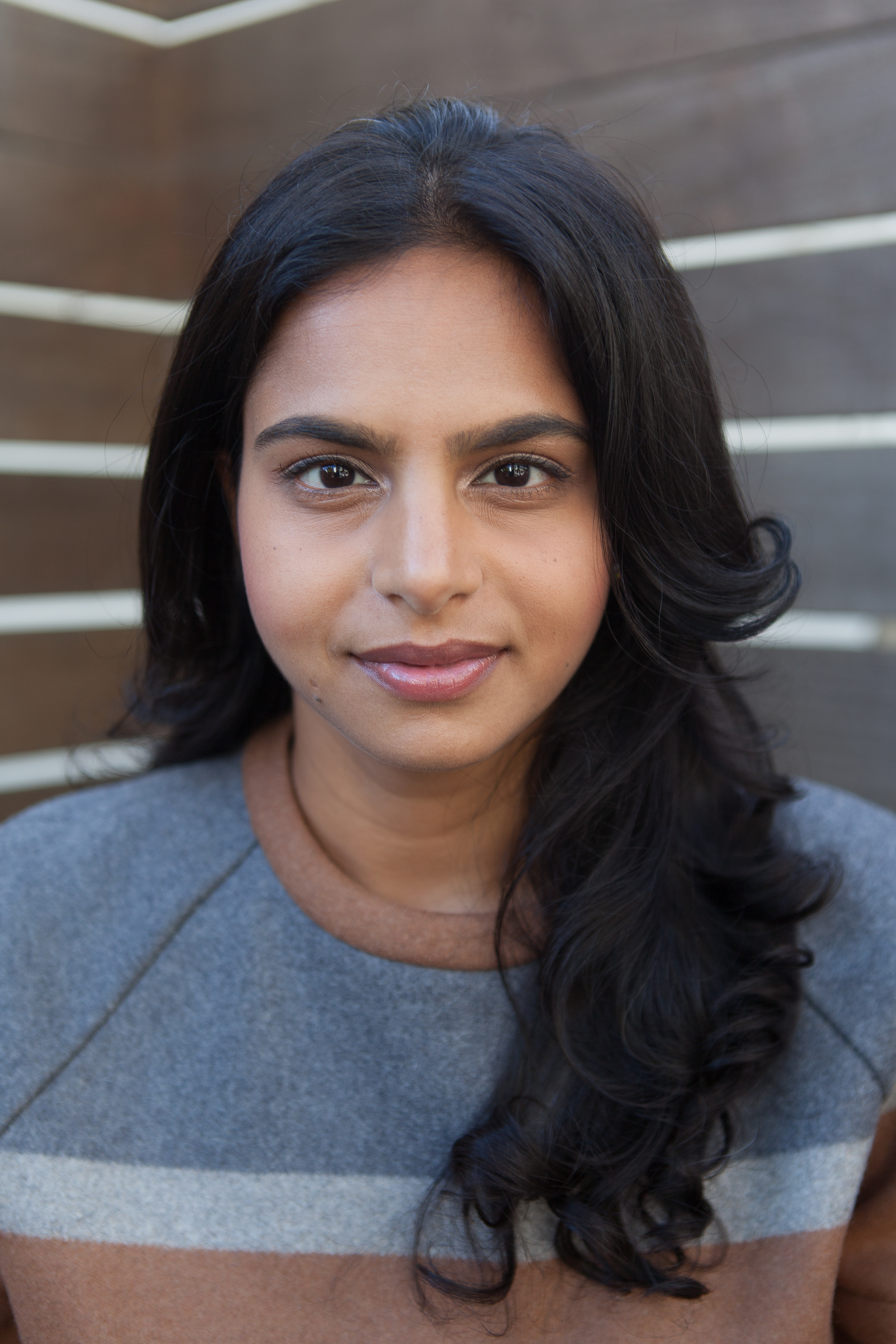
- Sanghvi in August 2014
- Born: 20 January 1982 (age 44); Pune, India
- Education: Carnegie Mellon University (BS, MS)
- Occupations: Computer engineer, businesswoman
- Spouse: Aditya Agarwal

Ruchi Sanghvi (born 20 January 1982) is an Indian-American computer engineer and businesswoman. She was the first female engineer hired by Facebook. In late 2010, she quit Facebook and in 2011, she started her own company Cove, with two other co-founders. The company was sold to Dropbox in 2012 and Sanghvi joined Dropbox as VP of Operations. She left Dropbox in October 2013.

In 2016, Sanghvi established South Park Commons, a residential and professional tech space that functions similarly to a hackerspace.

== Early life and education ==
Sanghvi was raised in Pune, India. When she was young, she intended to join her father's business after completing her studies. Sanghvi pursued her bachelor's and master's degrees in electrical computer engineering from Carnegie Mellon University.

== Career ==
=== Facebook ===
After graduating from Carnegie Mellon University in 2004, Sanghvi initially planned to work in New York City, but decided instead to move to Silicon Valley where her former CMU colleague Aditya Agarwal, whom she was dating, worked. She got a job at the Oracle Corporation.

In 2005, Sanghvi and Agarwal both started working at Facebook. Sanghvi was Facebook's first female engineer.

Sanghvi was one of the primary engineers on the first version of Facebook's News Feed product, launched in September 2006, and she wrote the blog post announcing its launch. The original news feed was an algorithmically generated and constantly refreshing summary of updates about the activities of one's friends. The concept was relatively new at the time, with Twitter having launched only a few months earlier.

The News Feed feature faced significant initial criticism, including some directed personally at Sanghvi. This was addressed through the introduction of new privacy controls regarding what personal data would appear in friends' news feeds.

=== Cove and Dropbox ===
In late 2010, Sanghvi left Facebook and in 2011, co-founded a stealth collaboration startup called Cove along with Aditya Agarwal. In February 2012, Dropbox, the file synchronization and backup service company, announced that it had acquired Cove and that Sanghvi and Agarwal would be joining Dropbox. Sanghvi later became the Vice President of Operations at Dropbox. In October 2013, she left Dropbox, but continued to retain an advisory role at the company.

=== South Park Commons ===
In 2015, Sanghvi founded South Park Commons (SPC), a technical community and co-working space located in the South Park neighborhood of San Francisco. It functions as a residential and professional hub for entrepreneurs, engineers, and researchers. Sanghvi serves as both co-head of the community and general partner in the SPC Fund.

== Board memberships ==
Sanghvi is on the board of UCSF and was previously on Paytm's board of directors.

== Philanthropy ==
Sanghvi was listed as one of the founders of FWD.us, a 501(c)(4) lobbying group formed in Silicon Valley to promote immigration reform, improve education, and facilitate technological breakthroughs in the United States. The group launched on 11 April 2013.

Sanghvi's personal story was featured on the FWD.us website's "Stories" section. In a 2013 interview with Mint, Sanghvi stated that her involvement with the group was motivated by a desire to boost the knowledge economy, specifically through immigration reform and the inclusion of STEM studies in the education system.

== Personal life ==
Sanghvi is married to Aditya Agarwal, who was her colleague at Carnegie Mellon University and later at Facebook, Cove, and Dropbox.

== Awards and honors ==
Sanghvi was awarded a TechFellow "Best Engineering Leadership Award" in 2011 for her work at Facebook.

In 2018, Sanghvi was a keynote speaker for HackMIT.
