= Treehouse Co-Living =

- Company type: Private
- Industry: Real estate Co-living
- Founded: 2016; 9 years ago
- Founders: Prophet Walker; Brent Gaisford; Joe Green
- Headquarters: Los Angeles, California, United States
- Key people: Prophet Walker (CEO)
- Services: Co-living communities
- Website: treehouse.community

Treehouse Co-Living is an American co-living real estate developer based in Los Angeles, California. It develops co-living communities and is recognized as having built the first ground-up co-living development in the United States.

== History ==
Treehouse Co-Living was founded in 2016 by Prophet Walker, Brent Gaisford and Joe Green. Walker became its chief executive officer, Gaisford its chief financial officer, and Green its chairman.

Treehouse received $5 million in seed funding, with investors including Blake Mycoskie, Alexis Ohanian and Justin Kan. It also received a grant from the Hilton Foundation for piloting mixed-income shared housing.

== Developments ==
=== Treehouse Hollywood ===
Treehouse's first project, Treehouse Hollywood, is located at 5842 Carlton Way in Hollywood, one block south of Hollywood Boulevard. Construction began in late 2017 on the $15 million development, which opened in 2019. The five-story building sits on an 8,500-square-foot lot that contains 60 bedrooms in 18 units and six studio apartments. It was designed by Soler Architecture + Design and Knibb Design.

Two units containing six bedrooms were designated as highly affordable housing for low-income tenants, with Treehouse partnering with My Friend's Place, a drop-in social-services center for homeless youth.

=== Koreatown Project ===
Treehouse's second major project was in Koreatown, Los Angeles, and was announced in 2019. In late 2022, Treehouse began construction of the building at 920 S. Gramercy Pl in Koreatown. It was financed through racial-equity bonds and state transit-oriented-development incentives. The five-story building with 13 units opened in spring 2023 and was later converted into homeless housing.

=== Park Mesa Heights Project ===
In September 2021, Treehouse filed plans for a 101-unit complex at 4421 S. Crenshaw Boulevard in the Park Mesa Heights neighborhood of Los Angeles after acquiring the site in 2020 for $5.75 million. The project includes 15 units, with 12 designated for extremely low-income residents, and 10,000 square feet of commercial area.

=== Treehouse Leimert Park ===
In 2021, Treehouse acquired a block on Crenshaw Boulevard to develop as Treehouse Leimert Park. Treehouse has submitted plans for an eight-story, 101-unit mixed-use building at 4421–4437 Crenshaw Blvd, across from the Leimert Park transit station.
