= Dave Morin =

American entrepreneur and angel investor (born 1980)

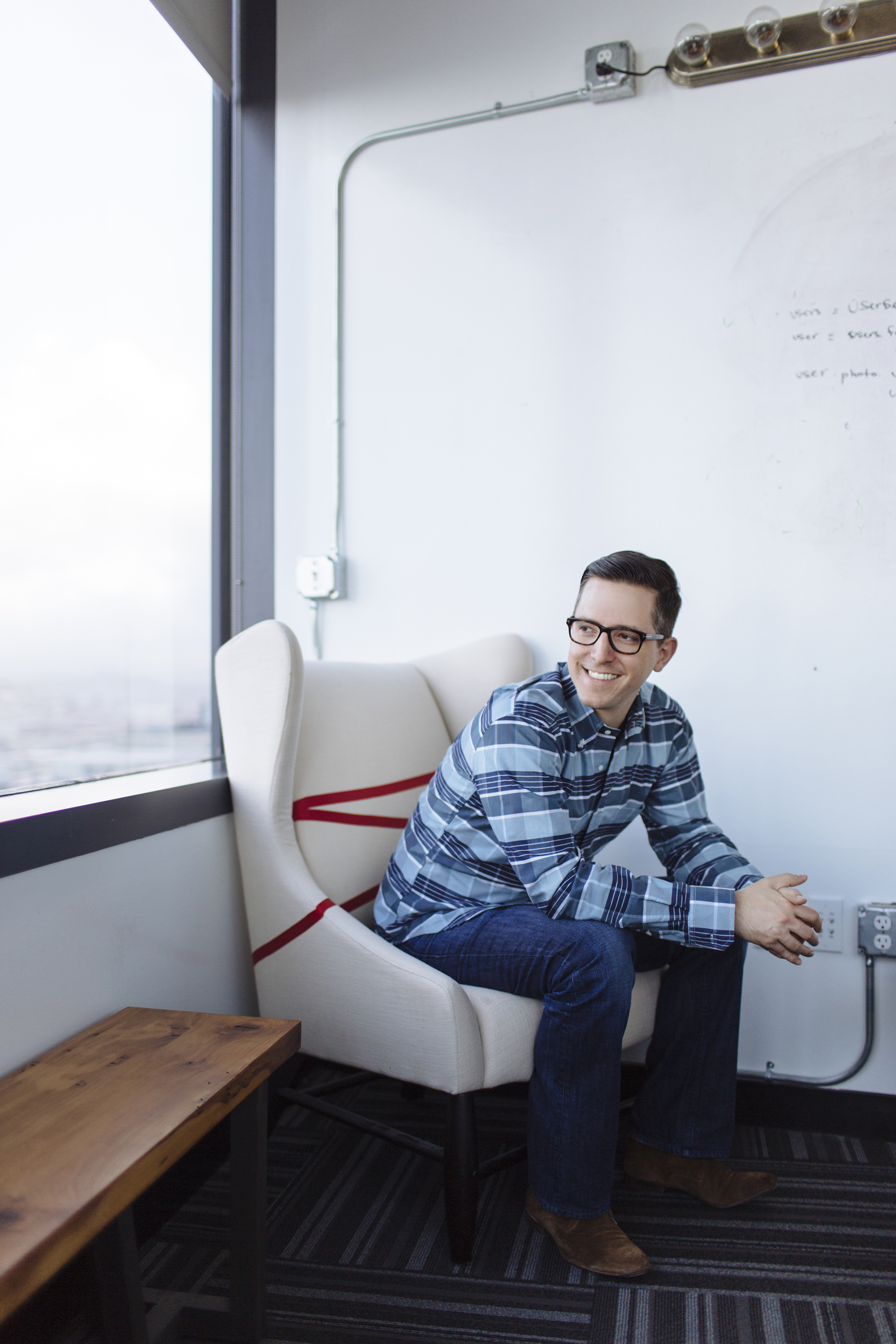
- Morin in 2014
- Born: October 14, 1980 (age 46); Helena, Montana, U.S.
- Education: University of Colorado Boulder
- Known for: Path; Slow Ventures; Facebook
- Spouse: Brit Morin (m. 2011)
- Children: 3

Dave Morin (born October 14, 1980) is an American entrepreneur and angel investor. He is best known for founding Slow Ventures and the social network Path. A former manager at Facebook, he co-created the Facebook Platform and Facebook Connect. In 2013, Morin helped found Fwd.us, a Silicon Valley-based 501(c)(4) lobbying group.

In 2020, Morin started Offline Ventures, a VC firm that uses a subscription funding model. He is a member of the board of directors for the United States Ski and Snowboard Association (USSA), Eventbrite, and Dwell Media.

== Early life ==
Morin grew up in Helena, Montana. Morin skied for the northern division of the U.S. Junior Olympic team. He attended the University of Colorado Boulder where he received a B.A. in Economics in 2003. He was a member of the Phi Delta Theta fraternity.

== Career ==
Morin began his career at Apple in 2003 where he assumed positions in marketing. In 2006, Morin left Apple and joined Facebook as senior platform manager. Morin co-created Facebook Platform, a software environment allowing third-party developers to create applications within Facebook, and Facebook Connect, a technology for Facebook members to connect their profile data and authentication credentials to external websites. In 2010, Morin left Facebook to co-found Path. Morin has helped to raise capital for startups such as Hipcamp through AngelList. He also founded the venture capital firm, Slow Ventures. It is based in San Francisco. Path announced its termination of service on September 17, 2018 and later confirmed that as of October 18, 2018, existing users will no longer be able to access the Path service.

== Politics ==
In 2013, Morin and several technological innovators, creators, or business owners launched Fwd.us, a Silicon Valley–based 501(c)(4) lobbying group.

== Personal life ==
Morin lives in Mill Valley, California, with his wife Brit Morin and their children.
