= Airtime.com =

Social media website

- Website type: Video chat, real time (media)
- Available in: English, Spanish
- Owners: Shawn Fanning, Sean Parker
- Website: www.airtime.com
- Launched: June 5, 2012; 14 years ago

Airtime was a group video, audio and text chat app available on iOS, Android, and desktop. Users had the ability to communicate with voice calls, video calls, text messaging, media and files in public or private group chats called "rooms". It originally launched to the public as a web product on June 5, 2012. It relaunched in April 2016.

== Overview ==
Airtime is a joint digital media venture between Sean Parker and Shawn Fanning that launched in June 2012.

== History ==
Airtime.com went live for general use on June 5, 2012. The site was launched after a press conference in New York City, which featured a number of major celebrities Snoop Dogg, Olivia Munn and Martha Stewart. As of October 2013, the site appeared to have few active users.

Before the launch in 2012, the startup landed a $25 million investment led by Kleiner Perkins in a second round of funding. This added to a list of investors that included Andreessen Horowitz, Accel Partners, Google Ventures and Social + Capital.

Airtime relaunched in 2016 as a mobile-first experience for iOS and Android.
