= George Oates =

Australian designer and entrepreneur

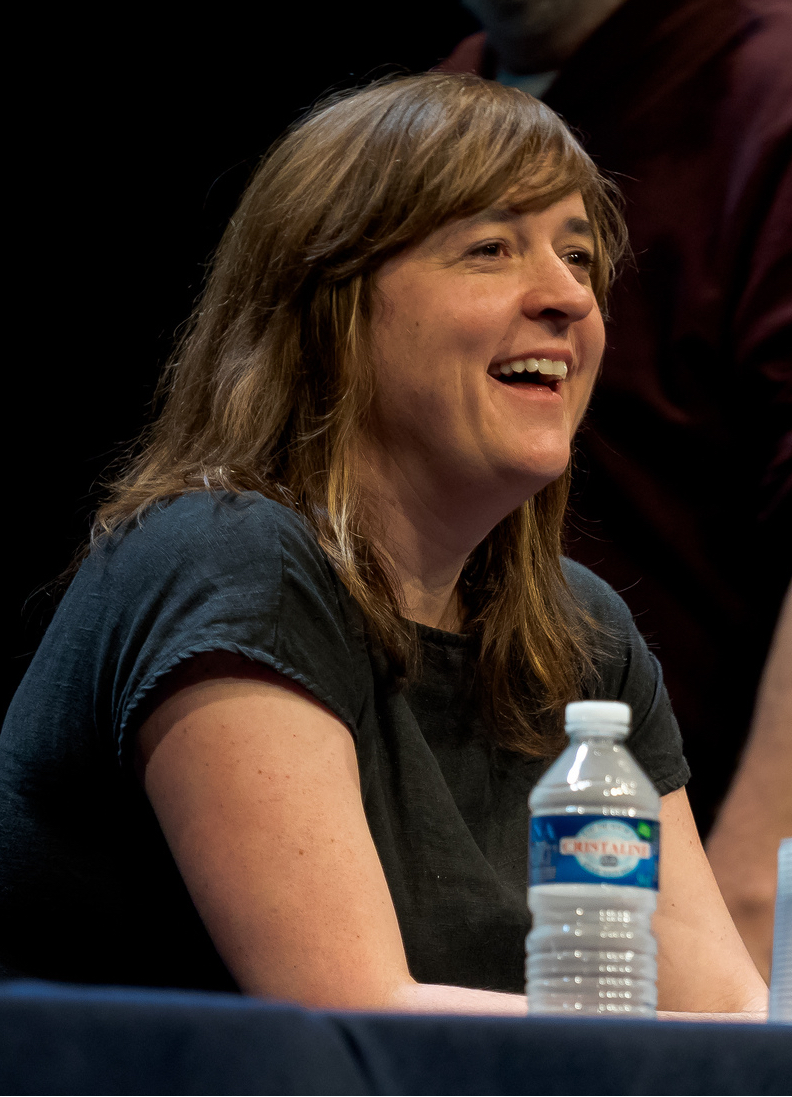
- George Oates in 2015
- Occupation: Designer
- Employer: Flickr Foundation
- Website: abitofgeorge.com

George Oates (birth name Georgina Oates, born 1973) is an Australian-born designer and entrepreneur, best known for being the first designer of the photo-sharing website Flickr and for creating the Flickr Commons program. Since 2007 she has worked in the cultural heritage sector and is regarded as "increasingly a go-to expert on digital archives". She has also written a book called If Only The Grimms Had Known Alice, a retelling of the Grimm brothers' fairy tales to include female characters.

== Early life ==
Oates was born in Adelaide, Australia, to an Australian father and a British mother, and is the youngest of three siblings.

== Career ==
In 1996, Oates was in the first group of employees at the Ngapartji Multimedia Centre in Adelaide, where she taught the general public how to use the internet and went on to teach courses in HTML and web design. After working in the web industry there for the next seven years, she left Australia in 2003 to start work at Ludicorp, the company that went on to make Flickr. After four years responsible for Flickr's design, Oates invented the Flickr Commons program, designed to make public photography collections available on Flickr with no known copyright restrictions. The first partner for the program was the Library of Congress, and it launched in January 2008. Oates was laid off by Yahoo at the end of 2008.

In 2009, she started work as director of the Open Library project at the Internet Archive. In her time there she also designed new interfaces for the Book Reader, the Wayback Machine, and the Archive.

From 2011 to 2014, Oates was art director at San Francisco data visualization studio Stamen Design. While in San Francisco, she was a judge for the 2013 Information is Beautiful Awards.

In 2014 she launched her own company called Good, Form & Spectacle, which has completed projects for institutions like The British Museum, The Victoria and Albert Museum and Wellcome Library.

Oates has spoken publicly about her work around the world since 2005, including at keynote speeches at Smithsonian 2.0, OCLC Futurecast, and Europeana Tech 2015, and is a public advocate for open cultural data and content.

Oates returned to Flickr Commons in 2021, with a plan to revitalize the program.

== Appointments and honours ==
In 2011, Oates was appointed a Research Associate at Smithsonian Libraries. She is also a non-executive director of Postal Heritage Services, a subsidiary of The Postal Museum, and is on the advisory board of the British Library Labs initiative, a Mellon Foundation-funded program to increase access to the library's collections.

== Bibliography ==
- If Only the Grimms Had Known Alice, George Oates, 2014, ISBN 9781320254229
