= Fierce, Isakowitz and Blalock =

American Republican government relations consulting firm

- Company type: Private
- Industry: Government relations and consulting
- Founded: 1978
- Founder: Donald Fierce
- Headquarters: 1155 F Street, NW Suite 950, Washington, DC 20004
- Website: http://www.fierce-isakowitz-blalock.com

Fierce, Isakowitz and Blalock is a Washington D.C. Republican government relations consulting firm.

== Client list ==
- Airbus
- American Forest & Paper Association
- American Gaming Association
- American Insurance Association
- American Pork Export Council
- American Television Alliance
- American Wind Energy Association
- Apple Inc.
- Apria Healthcare
- Bipartisan Policy Center Advocacy Network
- BP America
- Business Roundtable
- Coalition for Patent Fairness
- Coca-Cola
- Corporate Health Care Coalition
- CTIA - The Wireless Association
- Delta Air Lines, Inc
- EADS North America
- Edison International
- Facebook
- Federal Home Loan Bank of San Francisco
- Federation of American Hospitals
- Ford Motor Company
- FWD.us
- Generic Pharmaceutical Association
- The Home Depot
- JP Morgan Chase
- Kellogg's
- Magazine Publishers of America
- Managed Funds Association
- Medco Health Solutions
- MillerCoors Brewing Company
- Momenta Pharmaceuticals, Inc.
- Moore Capital Management
- Mutual of Omaha
- National Cable & Telecommunications Association
- National Pork Producers Council
- New York Private Bank & Trust
- NFL Players Association
- Noble Energy
- Och Ziff Capital Management
- Oracle
- Recording Industry Association of America
- Retail Industry Leaders Association
- Republic of Korea
- Sprint
- Time Warner Cable
- Union Pacific
- UnitedHealth Group
- US Chamber of Commerce
- URS Division of Washington
- Watson Pharmaceuticals Inc.
- Zurich International

== See also ==
- Lobbying in the United States
