= Rupture (social networking) =

Video game-themed social website

- Website type: Social network service
- Available in: English
- Founders: Shawn Fanning; Jon Baudanza
- Industry: Video games
- Website: http://rupture.com/index.html
- Commercial: Yes
- Registration: Required

Rupture was a social networking site for gamers. Users were able to create profiles and interact with one another with the standard array of social networking tools.

== History ==
Rupture was founded by Shawn Fanning and Jon Baudanza in June 2006. He did so because he wished to foster communication between players, find out what they're playing, and provide a showcase where they could display their accomplishments.

In June 2008 Electronic Arts, Inc. purchased ThreeSF, Inc., parent company of Rupture for $30 million.

The website is no longer accessible and redirects to EA.com.
