= Rachel Binx =

American data visualizer, developer, and designer

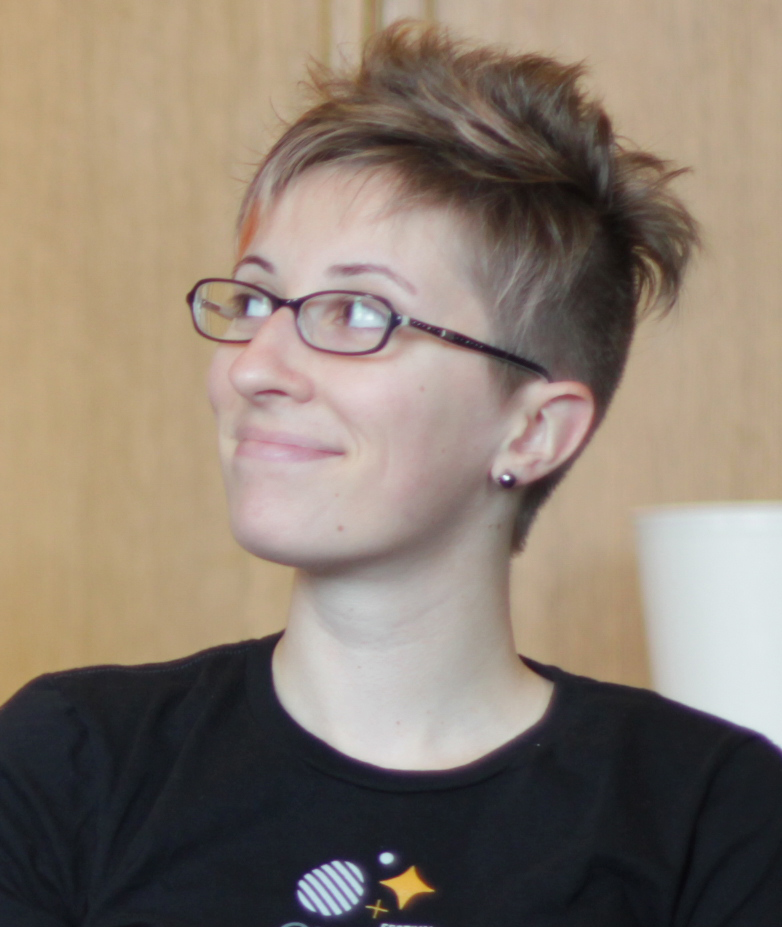
- Born: May 10
- Education: Santa Clara University
- Website: rachelbinx.com

Rachel Binx is an American data visualizer, developer, and designer. She is the co-founder of Meshu and Gifpop, two companies that create physical objects, such as maps and animated GIFs, from social data.

Binx has also worked at Stamen Design and NASA.

== Early life and education ==
Binx is originally from New Mexico. In 2006, she moved to California to attend Santa Clara University, where she received a B.S. in Mathematics and a B.A. in Art History. After graduation, she freelanced in data visualization and web design.

== Career ==
In 2011, Binx joined Stamen Design, a design and technology studio in San Francisco, California. At Stamen, Binx worked on projects for clients such as MTV, Facebook, and Oprah.

Binx co-founded Meshu, Gifpop and monochōme, small companies that explore creating one-off physical objects from the data that customers find meaningful.

Meshu was co-founded with Sha Hwang, another Stamen alumni. Meshu is a service where people can upload geographic data from services, such as Foursquare, to be made into jewelry and accessories. The resulting 3D printed object is created from data points uploaded by the user.

Gifpop is a service for making physical GIFs. The service prints lenticular-printed cards from uploaded gif files. It was launched via a Kickstarter project that raised over $35,000 from more than 1,000 backers.

In 2014 Binx founded monochōme, a clothing company that allows customers to use map tiles from OpenStreetMap to create a custom print on various articles.

In 2015, Binx joined the NASA Jet Propulsion Laboratory. There she built data visualization tools for rovers, satellites, and other space technology. Binx worked as part of the human computer interaction research group building data visualization tools for mission evaluations.

In 2022, Binx created Amtrak Explorer, an open-source tool to visualize Amtrak routes.
