= South Park Commons =

American venture capital firm and technology community

- Type: Private
- Industry: Venture capital, Community, Startup accelerator
- Founded: 2016; 10 years ago
- Founders: Ruchi Sanghvi and Aditya Agarwal
- Headquarters: San Francisco, California
- Area served: United States, India
- Key people: Ruchi Sanghvi (General Partner); Aditya Agarwal (General Partner); Prateek Mehta (Partner, India)
- AUM: US$500 million+ (2025)
- Website: southparkcommons.com

South Park Commons (SPC) is an American venture capital firm and technical community based in San Francisco, California. Founded in 2016 by former Dropbox executives Ruchi Sanghvi and Aditya Agarwal, the firm focuses on the "minus one to zero" phase of company building, a term the founders use to describe the pre-ideation stage of a startup. It has been described by technology publications as an "anti-incubator" due to its focus on individual talent rather than specific business ideas.

As of 2025, the firm manages multiple venture funds and operates physical locations in San Francisco, New York City, and Bengaluru.

== History ==
=== Origins ===
South Park Commons was established following the departures of Ruchi Sanghvi and Aditya Agarwal from Dropbox in 2015. Sanghvi, who previously served as Facebook's first female engineer, and Agarwal, Dropbox's former CTO, began organizing informal gatherings at their home in San Francisco to discuss technical topics with other engineers and operators.

In 2016, the community was formalized with a physical workspace in the South Park neighborhood. The organization positioned itself as a "learning community" inspired by historical groups such as Benjamin Franklin's Junto Club.

=== Expansion ===
In 2021, SPC expanded to New York City in the NoHo neighborhood. In 2024, the firm opened its first international location in Bengaluru, India, in partnership with Flipkart co-founder Binny Bansal.

== Model and programs ==
=== Residency & fellowship ===
SPC operates a venture capital model that targets the "-1 to 0" phase, distinguishing itself from accelerators like Y Combinator which typically invest in teams that have already established an idea or prototype ("0 to 1"). The firm's model has been profiled by Business Insider as an "exclusive tech community" that prioritizes the social and intellectual environment over immediate business plans. Forbes noted that unlike traditional funds, SPC invests in founders "before they have ideas," a strategy designed to mitigate the risks of the pre-ideation phase. The organization runs two primary programs:

- Community Membership: A residency for technologists, researchers, and domain experts exploring new concepts.
- Founder Fellowship: A funding track for members ready to found a company. As of 2025, the fellowship offered up to $1 million in funding, structured as split investments for the pre-seed and seed stages.

=== "Minus One" podcast and fireside chats ===
South Park Commons hosts a speaker series, including the "Minus One" podcast and fireside chats. Guests have included Mark Zuckerberg (CEO of Meta), Kevin Scott (CTO of Microsoft), Bret Taylor (Chairman of OpenAI), Sam Altman (CEO of OpenAI), and Satya Nadella (CEO of Microsoft).

== Funds ==
The firm moved from a community collective to a formal venture capital structure to back its members.

- Fund I (2018): Raised $55 million. As of the third quarter of 2025, Fund I had distributed two times its capital to limited partners, placing it in the top decile of funds from its vintage per PitchBook benchmarks.
- Fund II (2020): Raised $150 million.
- Fund III (2025): Raised $275 million.
- SPC India Fund (2025): A $40 million fund for Indian startups, led by partner Prateek Mehta.
- Fund IV (2026): In January 2026, the firm began raising $500 million, its largest fund, according to securities filings.

== Notable investments ==
Notable companies that have emerged from the SPC community or received investment include:

- Compound
- Pilot
- Replit
- Cure.fit
- Baseten Labs
