= Essembly =

Essembly.com
- Screenshot of the "Show Resolves" page on Essembly (User information concealed)
- Website type: Social network service
- Headquarters: Massachusetts
- Owners: Essembly, LLC
- Creator: Joe Green
- Website: http://www.essembly.com
- Commercial: Yes
- Registration: Required

Essembly was a non-partisan political social networking website that allowed its users to connect with one another based on political opinions, participate in unmoderated discussion, and organize for political action. It was founded in 2005 by Joe Green, a Harvard graduate and college roommate of Mark Zuckerberg, the founder of the collegiate social-networking site Facebook. Essembly differentiates itself from other social-networking sites by actively promoting intelligent discussion and debate while remaining (as the site's "About Us" page claims) "fiercely non-partisan." A July 2006 Newsweek article put the number of registered users at over 17,000.

After its launch in 2005, Essembly membership was offered by invitation only, as the website was still in closed beta. In May 2006, Essembly opened membership to the public (to anyone with a valid email address), and began to run advertisements on Facebook. Starting in September 2006, Essembly remained in public beta, the staff of Essembly has, on the whole, moved on to a new venture called Project Agape.

On January 30, 2010 Essembly stopped working after a successful computer activist effort to shut the site down over alleged cyberbullying activity coordinated by several of the Chicago-based members. After being alerted to the problem, Joe Green restored the site by Valentine's Day. However, since May, 2010 the site has been down due to lack of resources to counter the evolving shutdown effort.

== Features ==
Essembly contains a number of features common to social networking websites, such as the ability of the user to create a personal profile with information including a photo, contact information, non-political interests, voter information, and a brief resume for educational background and personal strengths. In addition to basic social-networking features, Essembly has several features which are unique.

=== Resolves ===
Interaction on Essembly centers around resolves, or "short ideological statements, designed to spawn debate." Members vote on resolves, by choosing to "agree, lean agree, lean against, or against." When a user votes on a resolve, this vote is recorded in their profile and added to their ideological calculation (see below). Additionally, members have the option of adding a comment that appears with their vote, allowing them to explain their opinion further. Each comment (which users cannot edit after posting) can be discussed via a second link, and it is in these small discussions that most of the website's debate takes place. Any member can post up to five resolves in a day.

=== Groups ===
While social groups in and of themselves are not unique to Essembly, the roles they play are different than groups on more traditional social-networking websites. While members can create groups with any stated purpose, they are frequently created with members sharing a common political ideal or support for a specific issue. Groups can post internal resolves that only members can vote on and discuss; alternatively, group administrators can post universal resolves under the group's name, viewable and open to discussion for the entire website.

=== Ideological Proximity ===
Essembly users can compare their political compatibility with other members (or even entire groups) by using the "Ideological Proximity" number, found in the user's profile. The number represents how likely you are to agree with the other user, based on voting histories with resolves. An ideological proximity of 100 means that the users have voted the same on every single resolve that they've both voted on, while a 0 means that they have voted opposite on every resolve. Users can bring up a list that shows each resolve in question and how each person voted, as well as which resolves that they voted on individually.
