= Path (social network) =

Social network

- Company type: Private
- Website type: Social networking
- Available in: English, Arabic, Norwegian, Dutch, French, German, Greek, Indonesian, Italian, Japanese, Korean, Malay, Portuguese, Russian, Simplified Chinese, Spanish, Swedish, Thai, Traditional Chinese
- Founded: San Francisco, California
- Headquarters: San Francisco, California, United States
- Area served: Worldwide
- Founders: Dave Morin; Shawn Fanning; Dustin Mierau
- Key people: Dave Morin; Shawn Fanning; Dustin Mierau
- Employees: 25
- Parent: Kakao
- Website: www.path.com
- Registration: Required
- Launched: November 2010
- Current status: Defunct
- Native clients on: Android, iOS, Windows Phone, Samsung Galaxy Gear 1/2
- Written in: C & Objective-C (iOS), Java (Android), Python (backend)

Path was a social networking-enabled photo sharing and messaging service for mobile devices that was launched on 14 November 2010. The service allowed users to share up to a total of 50 contacts with their close friends and family. Based in San Francisco, California, the company was founded by Shawn Fanning and former Facebook executive Dave Morin.

In 2011, Morin rejected a $100 million offer for the company from Google. On May 28, 2015, Path announced it had been acquired for an undisclosed amount by Kakao.

On September 17, 2018, Path announced its termination of the service. From October 18, 2018, existing users are no longer able to access the Path service.

== Service ==
Users update their stream on Path by posting photos and adding tags for people, places, and things.

Path initially limited each user's social network to 50 friends in order to encourage greater sharing of personal information by keeping it private to a person's inner circle of social contacts. Later, Path raised its friend limit to 150 and then removed it entirely. The site was intended as a companion to Facebook and other social network platforms, as opposed to a destination website.

== History ==
Original angel investor funding for Path was secured in November 2010, from "facebook alumni" including Marc Bodnick who cited personal belief in Dave Morin as his reason for investing.

Path's initial $2.5 million funding round included Ron Conway, Index Ventures, First Round Capital, Ashton Kutcher, Kevin Rose, Marc Benioff, Chris Kelly, and others.

In February 2011, the company raised a second round of $8.5 million in venture capital from Kleiner Perkins Caufield & Byers and Index Ventures along with Digital Garage of Japan. Path also turned down a $100 M acquisition offer from Google in February 2011.

In November 2011, Path relaunched with more features. By December 2011, it had grown from 30,000 to over 300,000 members in less than a month.

Path subsequently raised $30 million in venture capital from Redpoint Ventures. On January 11, 2014, the company announced it had raised another $25 million in venture funding from Indonesian Bakrie Group, Kleiner Perkins Caufield & Byers, Index Ventures, Greylock Partners, Insight Venture Partners, Redpoint Ventures, and First Round Capital. Indonesia was the world's largest Path userbase with more than 4 million users.

== Controversy ==
In February 2012, the company was widely criticized after concerns of accessing and storing user phone contacts without knowledge or permission. In a blog post by the CEO, the company apologized and changed its practices. Soon thereafter, in March 2012, the company received a request for information from Reps. Henry A. Waxman (D-California) and G. K. Butterfield (D-North Carolina) along with 33 other app developers asking them to detail what information they collect from users and how they use it.

In February 2013, the company was fined $800,000 by the FTC for storing data from underage users. The company would be required to have its privacy policies assessed every two years for the next twenty years. Along with the civil penalty, the FTC prohibited Path from making any misrepresentations about the extent to which it maintains confidentiality of its users' personal data.

In April 2013, a user alleged that Path sent spam SMS invitations to his phone contacts. TechCrunch then speculated that Facebook blocked Path's "Find Friends" access due to this occurrence; however, neither Facebook nor Path confirmed or denied such reports. Even so, Path users can still share their posts to Facebook. Facebook also cut off "Find Friends" access to other apps such as MessageMe and Voxer, which were formally cited as competitors to Facebook, programmers such as Montana Mendy contended this notion.

The company was named in a 60 Minutes report on Internet privacy and data brokers.
