= Causes (company) =

For-profit civic-technology organization

Causes.com
- Founded: 2007
- Headquarters: San Francisco, California, U.S.
- Owner: Countable Corporation
- Founders: Joe Green and Sean Parker
- CEO: Gary Tsifrin
- Employees: 21 (as of 2021)
- Website: causes.com

Causes is a for-profit civic-technology app and website that enables users to organize grassroots and public-awareness campaigns. Causes is a website that gives summaries of breaking news, new laws, and popular topics. Users can respond, comment, share, or contact their representatives about an issue. Users can also create their own "Cause" and seek support from other users.

In 2019, Causes was acquired by Countable Corporation. In 2020, Countable.us and its associated app merged with Causes.com.

== History ==
Causes was launched in 2007 as the first social advocacy application for Facebook. Causes was co-founded by Sean Parker and Joe Green. Parker had previously worked with Napster and Facebook, and he co-founded Plaxo. Green worked in grassroots organizing, including campaigns on the presidential level. Parker and Green combined their knowledge of offline organizing, online social networking, and product design to create Causes.

The platform provided over 20 million messages to Congress and was featured in a 2014 New York Times piece on political apps. It has also been featured in Wired, and TechCrunch. Investors included Sean Parker, Founders Fund, the Case Foundation and NEA (New Enterprise Associates).

Causes' stated mission is "to empower people to create change in the world through online organizing. Causes connects people who share a common vision and build the tools they need to make an impact". As of 2022, the Countable "Causes" network had over 190 million users.

Causes is a for-profit business.

=== Acquisition ===
Causes and its parent company Brigade Media were acquired by Countable Corporation in 2019. In 2020, Countable.us and its associated app merged with Causes.com.

== Products ==
Users are able to create, join, or browse causes focused on cause-related issues. Users of Causes could also create campaigns, where they published activity to a network of followers. Causes was used as a vehicle for community building, education, awareness, advocacy, and fundraising.
