= Hipcamp =

American online marketplace company

Hipcamp, Inc.
- Company type: Private
- Industry: Mobile app; Online marketplace; Outdoor recreation
- Founded: June 2013; 13 years ago in San Francisco, California
- Founder: Alyssa Ravasio
- Headquarters: San Francisco, California
- Area served: Australia; Canada; Europe; New Zealand; United States; United Kingdom
- Services: Camping; Lodging; Hospitality
- Number of employees: 80
- Website: hipcamp.com

Hipcamp, Inc. is an American company operating an online marketplace for booking campsites, RV parks, glamping stays, and private land camping experiences via a mobile app and website. Landowners and campgrounds list tent sites, RV spots, and lodging directly to Hipcamp's marketplace for users to find and book based on their location, amenities, and activities offered.

== History ==
Hipcamp was created by Alyssa Ravasio in 2013 prompted by her frustrating search for an available campsite near Big Sur, California. Ravasio built a platform that would aggregate available data for public campgrounds in one place. Ravasio enrolled in Dev Bootcamp, a 12-week coding crash course in San Francisco, California to teach herself how to code and launched the first version of Hipcamp that same year.

In September 2014, Hipcamp raised $2 million in seed funding led by O'Reilly Media's AlphaTech Ventures and Slow Ventures, with participation from Dave Morin, Sam Shank, Gregg Brockway, AngelList's Syndicate Fund and Maiden Lane Ventures.

== Product ==
Hipcamp allows users to search for and book campsites and rv spots based on location, natural features (beach, waterfall, forest, etc.), activities (biking, hiking, rock climbing, etc.), and amenities.

The COVID-19 pandemic led to Hipcamp seeing substantial growth in 2020; that summer, they generated three times the leads that they did in 2019.

In May 2025, Hipcamp doubled the inventory on the platform, by adding thousands of RV parks, camping resorts, and public lands to reach a total of 565,000 campsites available via the Hipcamp website and mobile app.

== Mergers & Acquisitions ==
In 2020, during the COVID-19 pandemic, Hipcamp expanded internationally by acquiring Youcamp, an Australian-based camping platform focused on private land camping

In 2021, Hipcamp acquired Pitched, a Canadian online marketplace startup.

In 2023, Hipcamp acquired Cool Camping, a United Kingdom-based camping platform focused on glamping.

In 2024, Hipcamp acquired BookOutdoors, a United States-based booking platform focused on RV resorts and holiday parks.
