= Metallica v. Napster, Inc. =

2000 US copyright infringement case

- Court: United States District Court for the Northern District of California
- Full case name: Metallica v. Napster, Inc.

Court membership
- Judge sitting: Marilyn Hall Patel

Metallica, et al. v. Napster, Inc. was a 2000 U.S. District Court for the Northern District of California case that focused on copyright infringement, racketeering, and unlawful use of digital audio interface devices. Metallica vs. Napster, Inc. was the first case that involved an artist suing a peer-to-peer file sharing ("P2P") software company.

== Background ==
Metallica is an American heavy metal band. The band was formed in 1981 in Los Angeles by vocalist/rhythm guitarist James Hetfield and drummer Lars Ulrich, and has been based in San Francisco for most of its career. Napster was a pioneering peer-to-peer file sharing Internet service, founded by Shawn Fanning, that emphasized sharing digitally encoded music as MP3 audio files. On April 13, 2000, Metallica filed a lawsuit against the file sharing company Napster. Metallica alleged that Napster was guilty of copyright infringement and racketeering, as defined by the Racketeer Influenced and Corrupt Organizations Act. The lawsuit was filed in the U.S. District Court for the Northern District of California. This case was filed soon after another case was filed against Napster, the A&M Records, Inc. v. Napster, Inc., which included 18 large record companies. Metallica v. Napster, Inc. was the first highly publicized instance of an artist suing a P2P software company, and encouraged several other high-profile artists to sue Napster. On May 2, 2000, the band held an online chat to discuss the case directly with fans.

== Case ==
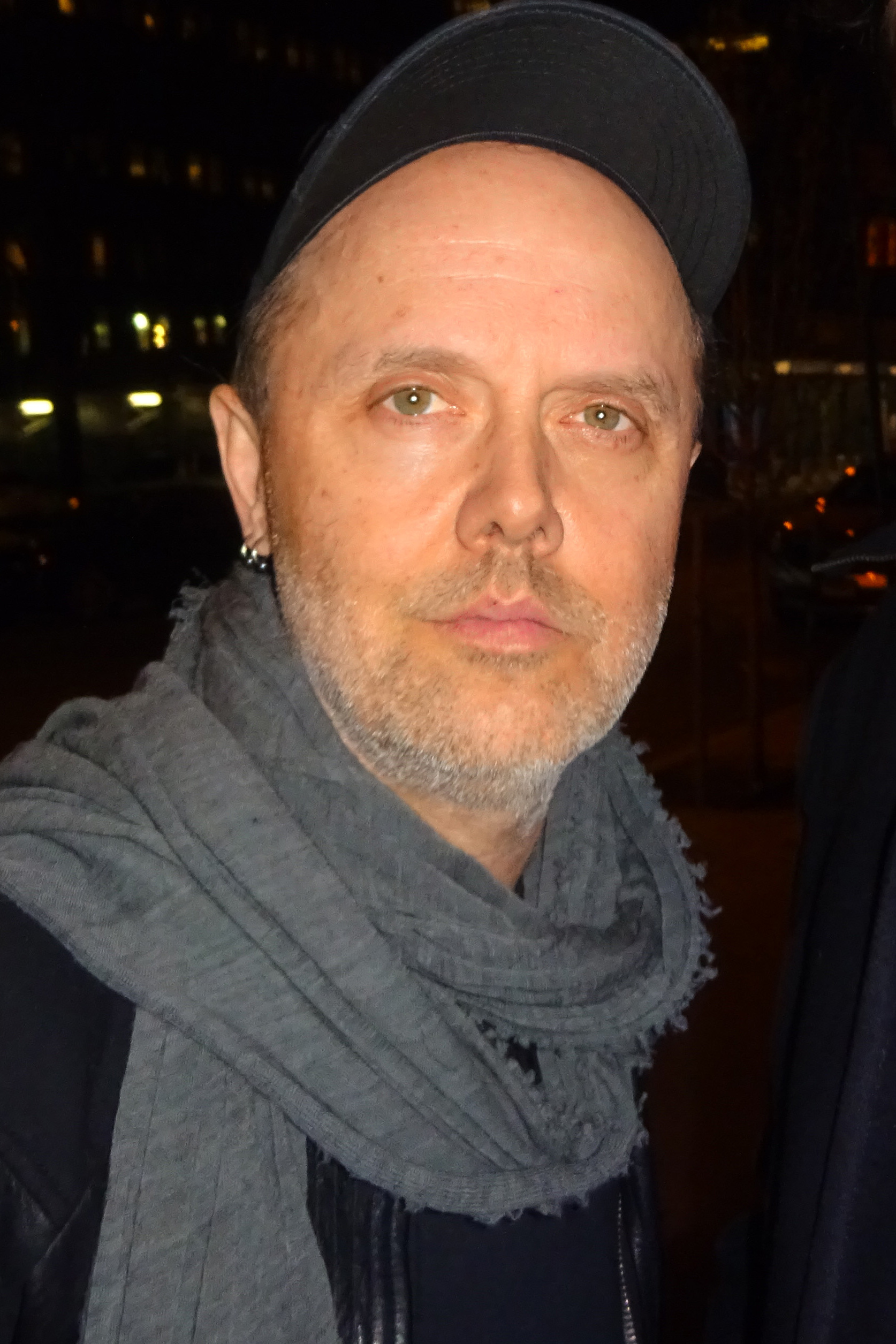
Lars Ulrich

On July 11, 2000, Metallica drummer Lars Ulrich read testimony before the Senate Judiciary Committee accusing Napster of copyright infringement. He explained that, earlier that year, Metallica discovered that a demo of "I Disappear", a song set to be released with the Mission: Impossible II soundtrack, was being played on the radio. Metallica traced the leak to a file on Napster's peer-to-peer file-sharing network, where the band's entire catalogue was available for free download. Metallica argued that Napster was enabling users to exchange copyrighted MP3 files.

Metallica sought a minimum of $10 million in damages (equivalent to $19 million in 2025), at a rate of $100,000 per illegally downloaded song (equivalent to $190,000 in 2025). Metallica hired NetPD, an online consulting firm, to monitor the Napster service. NetPD produced a list of 335,435 Napster users who were allegedly sharing the band's songs online in violation of copyright laws; the 60,000-page list was delivered to Napster's office. Metallica demanded that their songs be banned from file sharing, and that the users responsible for sharing their music be banned from the service. This led to over 300,000 users being banned from Napster, although software was released that simply altered the Windows registry and allowed users to rejoin the service under a different name. The lawsuit also named several universities to be held accountable for allowing students to illegally download music on their networks, including the University of Southern California, Yale University, and Indiana University.

=== Outcome ===
In March 2001, the federal district court judge ruling over the case, Marilyn Hall Patel, issued a preliminary injunction in Metallica's favor pending the case's resolution. The injunction, which was substantially identical to one ordered in the A&M case, ordered Napster to place a filter on the program within 72 hours or be shut down. Napster was forced to search its system and remove all copyrighted songs by Metallica.

Other artists including Dr. Dre, a number of record companies, and the RIAA subsequently filed their own lawsuits which led to the termination of an additional 230,142 Napster accounts. On July 12, 2001, Napster reached a settlement with Metallica and Dr. Dre after Bertelsmann AG BMG became interested in purchasing the rights to Napster for $94 million (equivalent to $170 million in 2025). The settlement required that Napster block music being shared from any artist that did not want their music to be shared. This $94 million deal was blocked when Judge Peter Walsh ruled that the deal was tainted because Napster Chief Executive Officer Konrad Hilbers, a former Bertelsmann executive, had one foot in the Napster camp and one foot in the Bertelsmann camp. Napster was forced to file for Chapter 7 and liquidate its assets.

In 2023, Slipknot’s Corey Taylor admitted that he supported Metallica’s lawsuit against Napster.

== Napster ==
The Napster program was originally a way for nineteen-year-old Shawn Fanning and his friends throughout the country to trade music in the MP3 format. Fanning and his friends decided to try to increase the number of files available and involve more people by creating a way for users to browse each other's files and to talk to each other. Napster went live in September 1999 and gained instant popularity. Napster's number of registered users was doubling every 5–6 weeks. In February 2001, Napster had roughly 80 million monthly users compared to Yahoo's 54 million monthly users. At its peak Napster facilitated nearly 2 billion file transfers per month and had an estimated net-worth of between $60 million and $80 million (equivalent to between $110 million and $150 million in 2025).

Fanning designed Napster as a searching and indexing program, meaning that files were not downloaded from Napster's servers but rather from a peer's computer. Users had to download a program, MusicShare, which would allow them to interact with Napster's servers. When users would log onto their Napster account, MusicShare would read the names of the MP3 files that the user had made public and would then communicate with Napster's servers so a complete list of all public files from all users could be compiled. Once logged into Napster a user would simply enter the name of the file they wanted to download and hit the search button to view a list of all the sources that contained the desired file. The user would then click the download button and the Napster server would communicate with the host's MusicShare browser to facilitate a connection and begin the download. This method of file sharing is referred to as peer-to-peer file sharing.

=== P2P ===
Peer-to-peer is a distributed application architecture that partitions tasks or workloads between cooperating users. By joining one of these peer-to-peer network of nodes, the users allow a portion of their resources, such as processing power, disk storage or network bandwidth, to be directly available to other network participants. By utilizing this type of application structure, any MP3s, videos, or other files located on a users' computer are instantly made available to other Napster users for download.

Napster's ease of use and large number of files available for download quickly made it popular. Being one of the first of its kind, Napster made a significant contribution to the popularity of the peer-to-peer application structure. A number of other software applications followed in Napster's footsteps by using this model including BearShare, Gnutella, Freenet, and today's major application of torrents including BitTorrent.

=== Issues surrounding P2P software ===
One of the largest issues with P2P software is the public assumption that users use these programs strictly for illegal sharing of copyrighted files. There are a number of other usages associated with P2P software. Some file sharing clients have been known to release confidential personal information, and come bundled with spyware, malware, or other viruses that could enable unsecure, unsigned codes to allow remote access to any file on the user's computer.

=== Artists using P2P for promotion ===
The relationship between music artists and P2P file sharing software is not always about infringing music. In a 2000 study, it was shown that users of Napster who download free music actually spent more money on music. In another study, it was proposed that by downloading free music, users are able to sample new music and find new tastes, which may lead to increased sales. Several artists also supported Napster and used the service for promotion. In 2000, Limp Bizkit signed a $1.8 million deal to promote 23 free concerts (equivalent to $3.4 million in 2025).

== Implications ==
Initial reaction to the ruling in the Metallica v. Napster, Inc. case included fears the verdict would affect the future of P2P file sharing and other industries that stemmed from the growing popularity of MP3 music. In RIAA v. Diamond, the Recording Industry Association of America sued Diamond Multimedia Systems for producing a portable MP3 player called the Rio. The RIAA claimed that the Rio did not comply with the Audio Home Recording Act (AHRA), and thus its production should be halted. The Ninth Circuit Court of Appeals ruled that the Rio was not covered by the AHRA and that it was designed simply to enable users to easily listen to MP3 files that were already stored on their personal computers or on other personal storage devices. In the earlier case of Sony Corp. of America v. Universal City Studios, Inc., it was ruled that Sony's VCR, which allowed users to record live television onto cassette tapes to be viewed at a later time, did not violate copyright law.
