= Snapguide =

IOS application and website for user generated step-by-step how-to guides

Snapguide was an iOS application and website that specialized in user generated step-by-step tutorial guides. Users could create guides on the site, where community members could comment on, rate, and share guides. It was created by Daniel Raffel and Steve Krulewitz, launching in March 2011. The aim of the application was to help people easily share knowledge, tips and tricks, and DIY projects with people who share similar interests.

Snapguide has been featured on CNN, Mashable, Techcrunch, The Washington Post, VentureBeat, Lifehacker, CNET, The New York Times, Wired, USA Today, Uncrate, AdWeek, GigaOm, All Things Digital, and Digital Trends.

== History ==
In 2010, while following the Tartine Country Loaf bread recipe, Raffel realized there was not an app that let users create step-by-step how to guides in real time from their mobile devices. After working together at Songbird, Raffel and Krulewitz decided to work on the idea together. They released the first version of their iOS app in March 2011. Snapguide employed a full-time staff of designers and engineers.

They received $10 million in funding as of 2014, from Atlas Venture, Index Ventures, SV Angel, Crunch Fund and Slow Ventures, among others.

The original content focused mostly on sharing food recipes. The content had expanded to include a larger array of categories, including Tech, Lifestyle, Beauty, Arts & Crafts, and Life Hacks. In June 2015, Lifestyle website Brit + Co acquired Snapguide to bolster their DIY empire.

== Features and community ==
Once signed in, users could follow each other, comment on, like, publish, share and request guides. They could also send personal messages to each other.

Many of Snapguide's users were ages 18–34, and are interested in DIY and maker content. Brands also used Snapguide, both as a marketing channel, and as a platform to help share unique features of their products.

In February 2014, the iOS app had a number of features. Users could view guides made by other users in a step-by-step format. In "Profile," users could create guides and view those they had already published. In "Explore," Snapguide editors could showcase top and trending content. In "Topics," Users could also browse guides by category. In "Requests," users could ask the community to create guides on particular topics and browse other popular requests. Once a request was fulfilled, anyone who had liked it was notified. In "Activity," users could monitor activity related to their guides and the users they followed.

When creating a guide, users could select a title and use photos, videos, and text to help explain. Users can upload photos they have taken with their iPhones (or with DSLRs if they use the web editor from a desktop computer).

The web editor went live in November 2013, to allow users to create a guide on the web.

Snapguide launched a contest feature in December 2013. Each contest was on a particular theme, and users submitted relevant guides to win a variety of prizes. At the end of the contest timeline, judges selected winners. Contests were normally sponsored by a partner who promotes the creation of UGC.

Fully functioning embeds launched in February 2014. Users would customize color, shape, and size of the iframe, giving embedded guides a native viewing experience from within 3rd party websites.
