= FWD.us =

American lobbying group

- Founded: April 11, 2013 (official launch)
- Founder: Joe Green (Founder and first President); Mark Zuckerberg (Founder and one of the main public faces of the group)
- Type: Social welfare organization United States IRS exemption status: 501(c)(4)
- Location(s): San Francisco and Washington D.C., United States of America
- Region served: United States
- Key people: Joe Green (Co-founder and first President); Todd Schulte (President); Zoë Towns (Executive Director); Mark Zuckerberg (Co-founder)
- Employees: >57
- Website: www.fwd.us

FWD.us is a 501(c)(4) immigration and criminal justice reform advocacy organization. It is based in the United States and headquartered in Washington, D.C., and it advocates for prison reform, status for undocumented immigrants, particularly for DACA recipients, and higher levels of immigration visas, particularly for H-1B visas for foreign workers in STEM fields.

The president of FWD.us is Todd Schulte, replacing previous president Joe Green in 2014. FWD.us was founded by leaders in Silicon Valley in 2013, including Mark Zuckerberg, who wanted to advance immigration reform. The group aims to build a bipartisan consensus around its proposed policies. However, it has garnered criticism for its connections to large technology companies, its support of the Keystone XL pipeline, and what critics have described as its "questionable lobbying practices".

The organization describes itself as "bipartisan" and includes both Republicans and Democrats, however, it has been described as being "backed by liberal-leaning tech CEOs and investors."

FWD.us has an affiliated 501(c)(3) organization, the FWD.us Education Fund.

== History ==
=== Early history ===
The first rumors of the creation of a lobbying group on immigration reform were reported by Evelyn Rusli in The Wall Street Journal on March 26, 2013. On April 4, 2013, Politico obtained a leaked prospectus prepared by Joe Green intended for prospective contributors, with a proposed name of "Human Capital" for the lobbying group. Green admitted that the prospectus was authentic but also stated that many details, including the name of the group, had changed since the time the prospectus was sent out.

FWD.us was launched on April 11, 2013. The launch was accompanied by an op-ed by Mark Zuckerberg in The Washington Post laying out the agenda and arguing for the vision of the group. There was extensive media coverage of the launch.

=== Timeline of key developments ===
Month and year	Key developments
March–April 2013	Early rumors of launch, leaked draft prospectus, official launch (April 11).
Late April and May 2013	FWD.us subsidiaries Americans for a Conservative Direction and Council for American Job Growth launch ads (including ads on conservative radio and talk shows) supporting pro-immigration reform politicians' other political positions, including the Keystone XL oil pipeline. FWD.us receives considerable media coverage. Environmentalist, liberal, and progressive groups protest the FWD.us strategy. Many pundits opine on whether FWD.us will be a long-term success.
June and July 2013	FWD.us launches tools for grassroots action on immigration reform, releases its Emma video, and launches a Tumblr blog.
September 2013	FWD.us releases a report on its effectiveness. Chris Hughes explains why he is not a member of FWD.us.
October and November 2013	FWD.us announces in October a hackathon for immigration reform, to be held in November. It announces it will work with Grover Norquist on immigration reform. It hires Darius Contractor as Chief Technology Officer.
Late January 2014, continuing through February and March 2014	FWD.us launches a $750,000 ad push to get the House Republicans to pass immigration reform. It also launches an app called Push4Reform to facilitate more grassroots activism. An ad released on March 3, 2014 receives considerable response.
September 2014	Joe Green leaves FWD.us, and Re/code claims that his departure appears forced. A blog post on the FWD.us website confirmed the leadership change.

== Goals ==
The main goals of FWD.us, as outlined by Zuckerberg in The Washington Post op-ed and described on the FWD.us website are:

1. Immigration reform (in the context of immigration to the United States)
2. Improving the quality of science and technology education (again focused on the United States)
3. Encouraging more investment in breakthrough technologies in a manner that benefits the public at large.

=== Immigration ===
Zuckerberg's op-ed written at launch as well as the FWD.us website describe the following main aspects of immigration reform that FWD.us will advocate for:

1. Improved border security.
2. An immigration policy that is biased in favor of attracting extremely talented and hard-working people.
3. A path to citizenship for current and prospective immigrants to the United States, including those who are present in the United States illegally.
4. An improved employment verification system, though not necessarily E-Verify.

A statement released on April 17, 2013, by Joe Green, the president of FWD.us, expressed approval of the preliminary immigration deal announced by the Gang of Eight.

As of 2020, the FWD.us website advocates against the Trump administration's use of "public charge" legislation to deny entry to those likely to become dependent on the government for cash assistance or long-term institutional care. It advocates a "path to citizenship" for undocumented immigrants.

== People ==
=== Staff ===
The FWD.us team was initially split between the Silicon Valley, where it was led by the president, Joe Green, and Washington D.C., where the team includes members such as Rob Jesmer (former executive director of the National Republican Senatorial Committee) and Kate Hansen (who worked as the communications director for the Democratic Governors Association in 2012).

After Joe Green resigned in favor of Todd Schulte, the organization has shifted more to emphasize Washington DC activities, recognizing its repeated failures to achieve reform and its perceived Silicon Valley elitism, e.g. in condemnations by Jeff Sessions and other lawmakers. Presently, the organization focuses on immigration related ventures, and a "broken criminal justice system".

=== Key supporters ===
Although some earlier reports, including the leaked prospectus by Politico, had suggested that Bill Gates and Marc Andreessen would be involved with FWD.us, their names did not appear on the FWD.us site at launch. However, Gates' name was added to the list of founders later.

Elon Musk (CEO of SpaceX and of Tesla Motors) was originally listed as a major contributor, but left the group in May 2013 in the wake of advertisements put out by FWD.us supporting some political activities that conflicted with Musk's environmentalist priorities. David Sacks, who was originally listed as a major contributor, also left the group at around the same time.

== Funding ==
According to news reports, the lobbying group is raising about $50 million (USD) for its lobbying efforts. As of April 2013, information about funds is not available on the official site, though a list of major contributors is available. As a 501(c)(4) organization, FWD.us is not legally obliged to disclose its list of contributors or how much it has received in contributions.

== Methods ==
=== Plans prior to launch ===
The leaked prospectus obtained by Politico suggested that the lobbying group was planning to use the tremendous leverage that tech companies and their leaders had in pushing their agenda to the public, similar to the tactics used for the protests against SOPA and PIPA that were coordinated for January 18, 2012. However, in the same Politico article, Joe Green said that the prospectus used misleading language, and that various tech leaders would, "operating solely as individuals", promote the agenda of the lobbying group.

According to the leaked prospectus, the tactics were described as follows:

"grassroots and grasstops" organizing in targeted congressional districts, online advocacy campaigns, paid online and television advertising that will be "critical to creating the political infrastructure we need" and "earned media."

=== The use of stories and media ===
A "Stories" section on the website features videos of FWD.us supporters featuring their personal stories. Featured videos include videos by Ruchi Sanghvi (who worked at Facebook and is now at Dropbox) and Max Levchin (co-founder of PayPal).

In June 2013, FWD.us launched a new video titled "Emma" pictured on the Statue of Liberty, and with a voice-over narrating a somewhat modified version of The New Colossus by Emma Lazarus. The modification replaced lines in the poem that emphasized America as a refuge for immigrants fleeing tyranny and poverty and instead focused on welcoming talented immigrants.

Around July 2013, FWD.us launched a blog on Tumblr to showcase its immigration stories.

On March 3, 2014, FWD.us launched a nationwide ad pleading House Republicans to move forward with legislation regarding United States' immigration reform. The ad scolds House leadership for not making moves to bring a comprehensive immigration bill to the House floor. The 60-second commercial asks, "Why are House Republicans cooling, retreating and even privately saying they'd rather do nothing this year? Nothing won't do. Call House Republicans today. Tell them we've waited long enough, pass immigration reform." The commercial is set to run in all 50 states at a cost of $500,000.

=== Political lobbying and subsidiaries ===
The lobbying firm Fierce, Isakowitz and Blalock reported that FWD.us had paid it 30,000 USD in March 2013 (prior to the official launch of FWD.us) to lobby for immigration reform. A blog post by the Sunlight Foundation sought to put FWD.us in the context of the existing state of immigration lobbying.

On April 23, 2013, Politico reported that FWD.us had created a front group called "Americans for a Conservative Direction" that would air political ads in support of Republican politicians who supported immigration policies similar to those desired by FWD.us. Video advertisements were already being aired in favor of pro-immigration and pro-amnesty conservative politicians Lindsey Graham and Marco Rubio. The Politico report also indicated that FWD.us was planning to open another front group called "Council for American Job Growth" designed to appeal to people with progressive political sensibilities. The pro-conservative advertisements met with considerable backlash from progressive friends and erstwhile supporters of Zuckerberg and the cause.

In May 2013, The New York Times called the ads a "sophisticated lobbying campaign being waged by technology companies and their executives."

In July 2013, Roll Call reported that FWD.us had paid $90,000 each to lobbying firms Fierce, Isakowitz and Blalock and Peck Madigan Jones in the second quarter of 2013, triple of what it had paid to each firm in the first quarter of 2013. The report was based on filings by the lobbying firms. The same article used media reports (not official filings) to estimate that FWD.us had spent about $5 million in political advertising over the period.

On January 31, 2014, a number of media outlets reported that the FWD.us subsidiary Americans for a Conservative Direction was launching a $750,000 USD campaign to fund the Republican Party's "immigration reform" campaign and encourage a bipartisan deal on immigration reform. It was also reported that the group had distributed a 30-page memo arguing in favor of immigration reform and critiquing the "real motivations" behind anti-immigrant groups Center for Immigration Studies, Federation for American Immigration Reform, and NumbersUSA.

=== Op-eds and articles in mainstream publications ===
At launch, principal founder Mark Zuckerberg wrote an op-ed in The Washington Post outlining the goals of the group. After the passage of a proposed immigration bill in the US Senate, FWD.us President Joe Green wrote an opinion piece on the CNN website urging the US House of Representatives to pass the bill as well.

=== Facilitating grassroots activism ===
On June 6, 2013, FWD.us launched tools that enabled US residents to phone their senators and representatives to express views on the immigration bill that would soon be put to a vote.

On October 18, 2013, FWD.us announced a hackathon for November 2013 where the participants would be either DREAMers or mentors, where DREAMer was the FWD.us jargon for undocumented immigrants in the United States. The hackathon would be hosted by Reid Hoffman at LinkedIn's office and Mark Zuckerberg would be one of the mentors. The announcement was covered by BuzzFeed and the Los Angeles Times. The event itself received coverage in PandoDaily, The Week, and CNet.

In late October 2013, it was announced that FWD.us was teaming up with pro-amnesty advocate Grover Norquist as well as evangelical groups to push its immigration agenda.

In January 2014, FWD.us launched Push4Reform, an app aimed at helping supporters connect with their elected representatives and urge them to take action.

=== Report on effectiveness ===
In September 2013, FWD.us released a report with some hard numbers on its impact and effectiveness.

== Reception ==
=== Parallels drawn with other present and past groups ===
The first report in The Wall Street Journal that reported rumors of the lobbying group that would eventually become FWD.us considered its possible overlap in goals and methods with Michael Bloomberg's group called the Partnership for a New American Economy as well as with the March for Innovation, a "virtual march for immigration reform." An in-depth article in The New Republic likened FWD.us to the Technology CEO Council, founded 24 years before FWD.us by the heads of first-generation computing companies like Dell, Intel, Xerox, and Hewlett-Packard.

=== Viability of the approach ===
The launch of FWD.us met with a wide range of reactions. Gregory Ferenstein, writing for TechCrunch, expressed skepticism regarding whether FWD.us was that different from existing lobbying groups and whether it would be able to accomplish anything. Om Malik, writing for GigaOm, also expressed a mixed reaction, albeit for different reasons.

The "cynical" approach taken by FWD.us in its political lobbying and campaigning has met with some criticism. However, an article in The New Republic argued that the cynical approach might be necessary for FWD.us to meet its goals, while noting dissent from "Silicon Valley libertarians" such as Michael Arrington and Peter Thiel (neither of whom was listed as a contributor to FWD.us) from the idea of trying to influence politics and play the political game. Chamath Palihapitiya and Jim Breyer defended the approach used by FWD.us despite the political backlash.

Anil Dash wrote a lengthy review of FWD.us describing both the positives and negatives of the group.

== Criticism ==
=== Keystone XL oil pipeline support ===
FWD.us was revealed to have paid tens of millions of dollars for advertisements supporting Senators Marco Rubio, Lindsey Graham, and Mark Begich, who also supported the Keystone XL oil pipeline. In addition, FWD.us ran advertisements praising the Keystone XL pipeline through its subsidiaries.

The reaction was mixed among observers. At least two key members of the group withdrew support from FWD.us, including Elon Musk, a founder of the electric carmaker Tesla and rocket company SpaceX, and David O. Sacks, chief executive of Yammer. Several liberal organizations suspended advertisements on Facebook, including the Sierra Club, the League of Conservation Voters and MoveOn.org.

At least five people protesting Zuckerberg's involvement in FWD.us were arrested at Facebook's first shareholder meeting on June 11, 2013.

In September 2013, Chris Hughes, one of the earliest employees at Facebook who had played an important role in the Barack Obama 2008 presidential campaign, explained to Erin Griffith in an interview the reasons for his not being involved with FWD.us despite being close to the founders. He said, "They've taken a stance on all kinds of things, from [the Keystone XL pipeline] to other issues, which are not reflective of my own."

=== Elitism and endorsement of restrictionism ===
An article in The Verge was critical of the adaptation of "The New Colossus" by FWD.us in its video titled "Emma" on the grounds that the adaptation was elitist and replaced the idealism of the original poem by the self-interested position of the technology lobby. Similar criticisms were echoed in a comment thread on Mark Zuckerberg's Facebook post where he shared the video. Zuckerberg replied at length, concluding with, "The bigger problem we're trying to address is ensuring the 11 million undocumented folks living in this country now and similar folks in the future are treated fairly."

An article in The Huffington Post was critical of FWD.us for running advertisements on the radio shows of Sean Hannity and Rush Limbaugh that claimed that US border security was in shambles and endorsed the border security provisions in the immigration bill. The Huffington Post article pointed to record deportation levels under Barack Obama's presidency as well as quoted from a report by the Migration Policy Institute to question the claims made in the advertisements.

Hector Ruiz, former chairman and CEO of Advanced Micro Devices, wrote a piece critical of Mark Zuckerberg arguing that freer migration and a path to citizenship should be extended to all people, not just an elite.

Shaun Raviv in an article for The Atlantic critiqued Mark Zuckerberg and FWD.us for the modesty of their vision, their focus on high-skilled immigration, and their endorsement of border security.
