= Plaxo =

Company

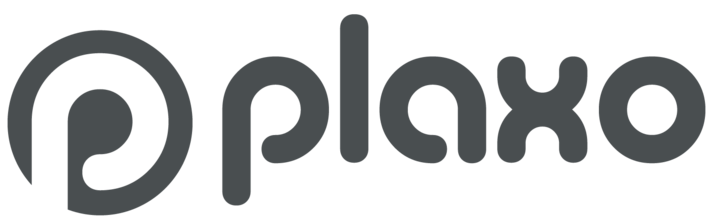
- Type: Subsidiary of Comcast
- Founded: November 2002
- Founder: Sean Parker, Todd Masonis and Cameron Ring
- Defunct: 2017-12-31
- Headquarters: Sunnyvale, California
- Key people: Justin Miller, President & CEO

Plaxo was an online address book that launched in 2002. It was a subsidiary of cable television company Comcast from 2008 to 2017. At one point it offered a social networking service.

== History ==
The company was founded by Sean Parker and two Stanford University engineering students, Todd Masonis and Cameron Ring. Rikk Carey joined Plaxo at its inception and led engineering and products for six years as Executive Vice President. Funded by venture capital including funds from Sequoia Capital, the service officially launched on November 12, 2002.

In December 2003, Plaxo was criticized by technology journalist David Coursey, who was upset about receiving a number of requests from Plaxo users to update their contact information (similar to spam email), and who wondered how the company was planning to make money from a free service that collects personal contact and network information. However, after "changes at Plaxo and discussions with the company's remaining co-founders", Coursey reversed his stance. Plaxo also responded to these issues in a section of their website.

On July 7, 2005, Plaxo announced it had struck a deal with America Online to integrate its contact management service with its AOL and AOL Instant Messenger products.

On May 7, 2007, Comcast announced that it had partnered with Plaxo in the launch of its universal communications service, SmartZone.

On August 4, 2007 Plaxo announced the public beta of a social networking service called Plaxo Pulse. The service enabled sharing of content from multiple different sources across the social web, including blogs, photos, social networking services, rating services, and others. Users can selectively share and view content according to either pre-determined categories (e.g., friends, family, business network) or customized groups. Plaxo Pulse was the first site to feature a working version of an OpenSocial container.

In May 2008, Plaxo announced that it had signed an agreement to be acquired by Comcast. The terms of the deal were not disclosed. Comcast completed its purchase of Plaxo on July 1, 2008. That month the website reported 20 million users.

In March 2010, it was announced that CEO Ben Golub would be replaced by the company’s general manager, Justin Miller.

In March 2011 Plaxo's head of product management, Preston Smalley, was named general manager; at the same time, Plaxo announced that it was exiting social networking, ending the Plaxo Pulse social networking service, and introducing a new address book updating service.

On October 1, 2017, Plaxo notified its users that it would be shutting down the Plaxo service at the end of the day on December 31, 2017.

== Functionality ==
Plaxo provided automatic updating of contact information. Users and their contacts stored their information in the cloud on Plaxo's servers. When this information was edited by the user, the changes appeared in the address books of all those who listed the account changer in their own books. Once contacts were stored in the central location, it was possible to list connections between contacts and access the address book from anywhere.

A Plaxo plug-in supported major address books including Outlook/Outlook Express, Mozilla Thunderbird, and macOS's Contacts, iOS and BlackBerry, and others could be supported through an application programming interface. Additionally, Plaxo could be maintained online.

=== Plaxo 3.0 ===
On June 24, 2007 Plaxo announced the public beta of a major new version of its service, called Plaxo 3.0. The service emphasizes "automated, multi-way sync."

=== Charging for Outlook synchronization service ===
On July 30, 2009, the previously free synchronization services for Outlook moved to Plaxo's premium (paid) service. According to Plaxo, "this change will allow us to continue to invest in the development and support of this valuable (but high-cost) feature." Existing users of the free service were offered a 20% lifetime discount on Plaxo premium. This paid service was called Platinum Sync.

=== Personal Assistant ===
On March 16, 2011, Plaxo announced its Personal Assistant which updates users' address books with suggestions from publicly available information.

=== Mobile applications ===
On July 19, 2011, Plaxo announced an improved iPhone app; a new BlackBerry app; a Windows Mobile app; and syncing for Android phones with an app coming out by the end of September.
