= Countable (company) =

American software company

- Industry: Technology
- Founded: 2013
- Founder: Bart Myers
- Headquarters: San Francisco, U.S.
- Website: Official website

Countable Corporation (a.k.a. Countable) is a Software-as-a-Service (SaaS) company based in San Francisco. The company was founded in 2013 by its CEO Bart Myers.

Countable Corporation offers two platforms, Countable.com and Causes.com. Countable.com is an enterprise platform that helps corporations, non-profits, and political campaigns manage their communities with a series of engagement tools. Causes.com is the consumer facing arm of the company that also offers similar tools for consumers, smaller companies and non-profits.

After their merger with Causes in 2020, Countable relaunched as an enterprise platform that provides tools for community and engagement to corporations, non-profits, and political campaigns.

== History ==
In 2013, Countable was launched by Bart Myers, with Canaan Partners as an investing partner. Initially it was launched at Countable.us, a website and award-winning iOS and Android application designed to lower barriers to civic entry.

Countable enables users to track legislation and contact their local representatives in government. It also covers breaking news stories and invites users to weigh in on polls, petitions, and opinion questions about pressing political and social issues.

It was featured in a 2014 New York Times piece on political apps. It was also featured in GQ, Wired, and Tech Crunch.

== Acquisition of Causes and Merger ==
In 2019, Countable acquired Causes and Brigade, a company owned by Sean Parker, which is a similar platform to countable.us and was the first application on Facebook. In 2020, Countable.us merged with Causes, and placed a redirect from Countable.us to Causes.com. The apps have also combined into one.

== Relaunch of Countable.com ==
In 2020, Countable.com (previously known as Countable Pro) relaunched. It represents the enterprise B2B arm of Countable and helps corporations, non-profits, and political campaigns manage their communities with a series of engagement tools.

Countable has worked with Starbucks, Uber, Levi's, Patagonia, Bernie Sanders, the Los Angeles Times and dozens of others.

In August 2020, Countable powered the virtual Democratic National Convention.
