= 2026 California gubernatorial election =

- November 3, 2026
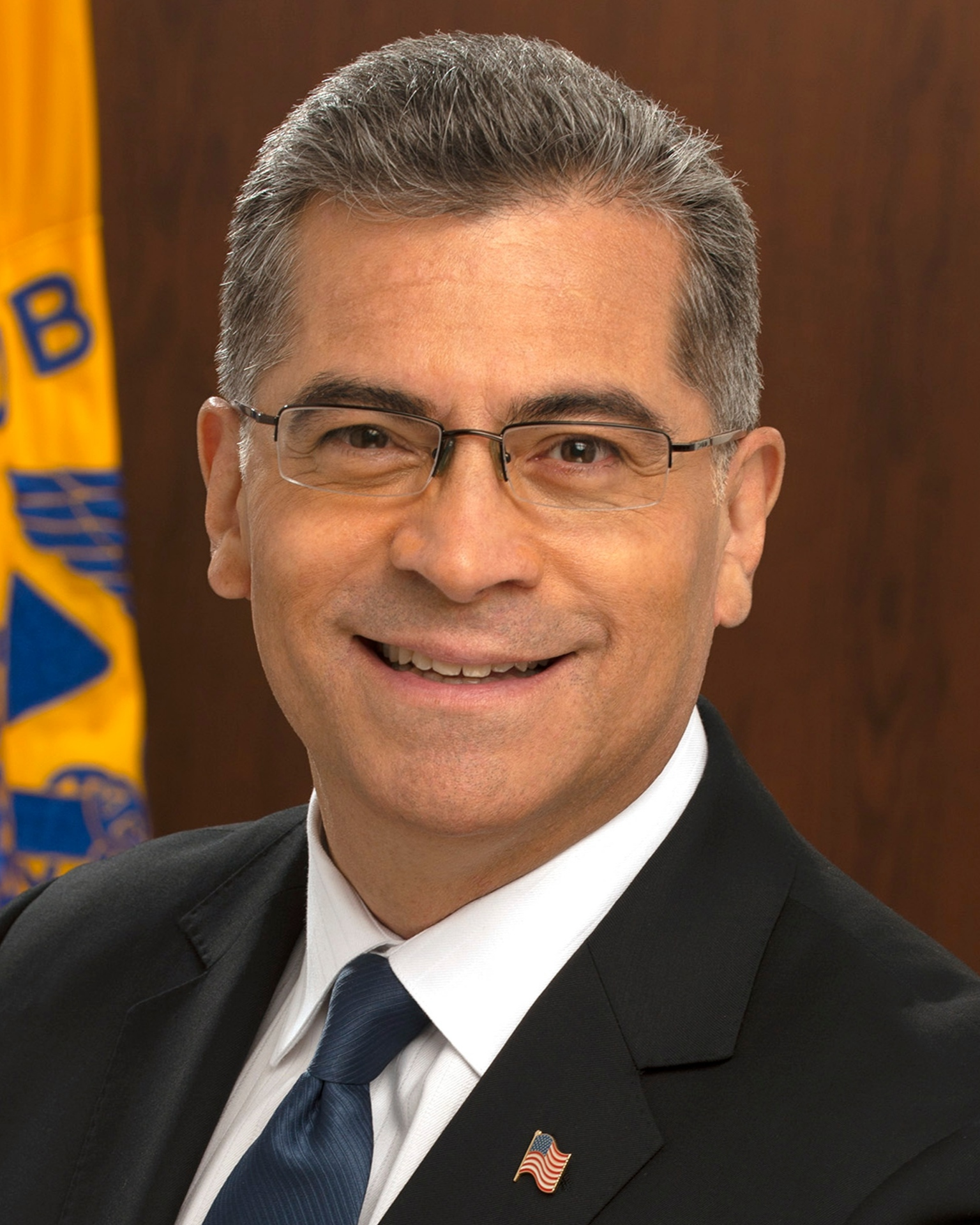

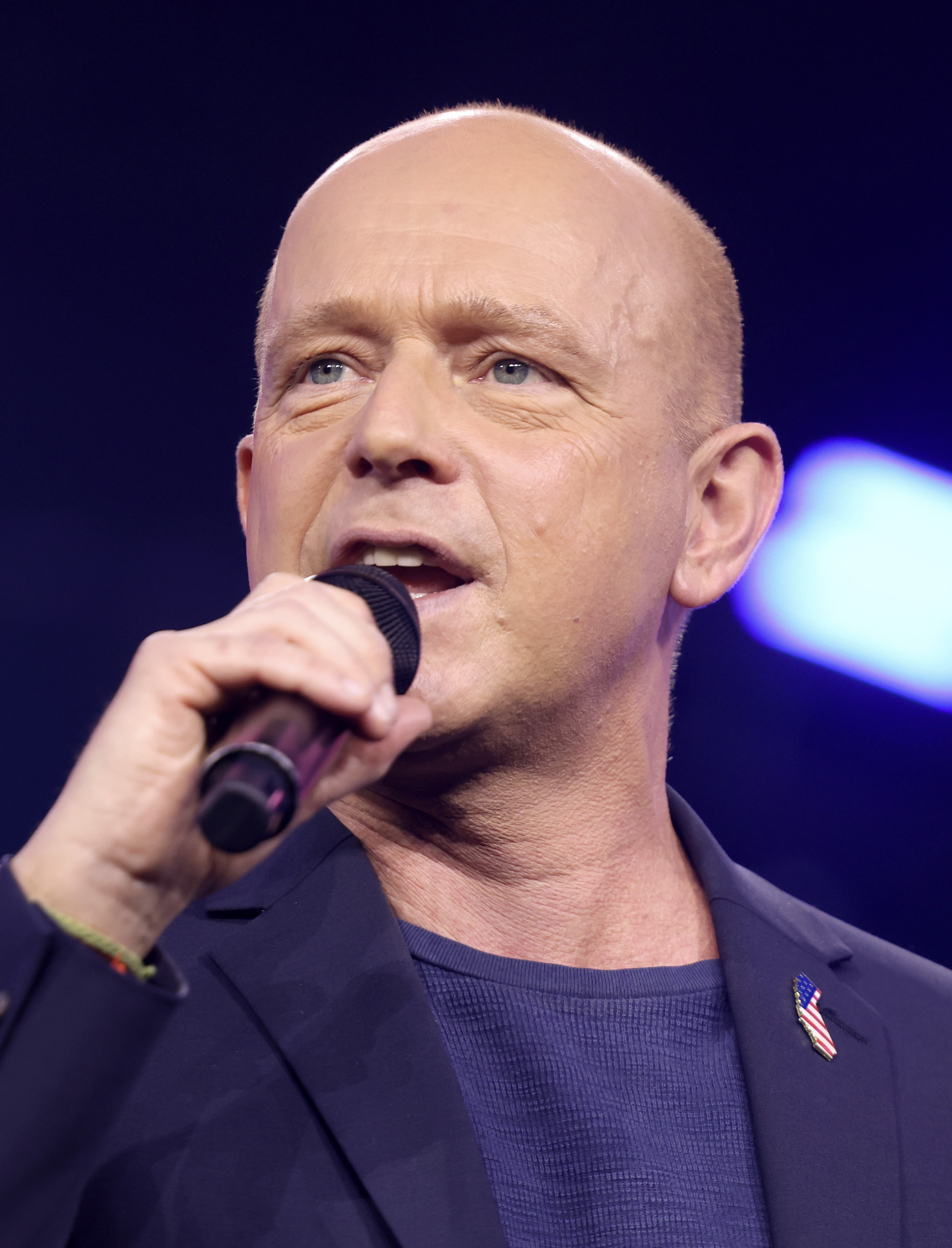
Candidate	Xavier Becerra	Steve Hilton
Party	Democratic	Republican
Popular vote	8,714,908	4,560,879
Percentage	65.6%	34.4%
- Becerra: 50–60% 60–70% 70–80% 80–90% Hilton: 50–60% 60–70% 70–80%
Governor before election
Gavin Newsom
Democratic
Elected Governor
Xavier Becerra
Democratic

An election was held in the U.S. state of California on November 3, 2026, to elect the next governor of California. The nominees were Democratic former secretary of health and human services Xavier Becerra and Republican political commentator Steve Hilton. Democratic incumbent Gavin Newsom was ineligible to seek re-election to a third term. Becerra defeated Hilton with over 65% of the vote, the best performance from any California gubernatorial candidate since Earl Warren's lopsided victory in 1946. Becerra flipped several counties won by Republicans in previous elections, notably the traditionally conservative Kern County, thereby winning every county in Southern California.

The statewide top-two primary election was held on June 2, 2026, with Becerra and Hilton advancing to the general election among the 61 candidates on the ballot. Republicans have won neither a gubernatorial nor any statewide election in California since 2006.

== Candidates ==
=== Democratic Party ===
==== Advanced to general ====
- Xavier Becerra, former U.S. secretary of health and human services (2021–2025)

==== Eliminated in primary ====
- Akinyemi Agbede, mathematician and educator
- Mohammad Arif, immigrants organizer
- Larry Azevedo, businessman
- Carolina Buhler, UCLA student
- Louis De Barraicua, teacher and business owner
- Sophia Edum-a-Sam, project manager
- Derek Grasty, Mount Pleasant Elementary School District trustee (2024–present)
- Joel Jacob, business owner
- Gary Howard Kidgell, building consultant
- Matthew Levy, physicist
- Matt Mahan, mayor of San Jose (2023–present)
- Kalid Meky (write-in)
- Barack Obama Shaw, business owner
- Thunder Parley, software engineer
- Jibri J. Peavy (write-in)
- Katie Porter, former U.S. representative from California's 47th congressional district (2019–2025) and candidate for U.S. Senate in 2024
- Raji Rab, pilot and perennial candidate
- Satish Rao, UC Berkeley professor
- Scott Shields, executive director
- Tom Steyer, environmental activist, founder of Farallon Capital and candidate for president in 2020
- Tony Thurmond, superintendent of public instruction of California (2019–present)
- Antonio Villaraigosa, former mayor of Los Angeles (2005–2013), former speaker of the California State Assembly (1998–2000), and candidate for governor in 2018
- Erin Zezulak, consultant

==== Withdrawn ====
- Ethan Agarwal, tech entrepreneur (ran for U.S. House)
- Toni Atkins, former president pro tempore of the California State Senate (2018–2024) from the 39th district (2016–2024) and former speaker of the California State Assembly (2012–2016) from the 78th district (2010–2016) (endorsed Steyer)
- Ian Calderon, former majority leader of the California Assembly (2016–2020) from the 57th district (2012–2020) (initially endorsed Swalwell) (Note: Endorsement rescinded following allegations of sexual assault levied against Swalwell by multiple women.)
- Stephen Cloobeck, founder of Diamond Resorts (initially endorsed Swalwell)
- Zoltan Istvan, founder of the Transhumanist Party, Libertarian candidate for governor in 2018, and Republican candidate for president in 2020
- Eleni Kounalakis, lieutenant governor of California (2019–present) (running for state treasurer)
- Fiona Ma, California state treasurer (2019–present) (running for lieutenant governor)
- Eric Swalwell, former U.S. representative from California's 14th congressional district (2013–2026) and candidate for president in 2020 (remained on ballot)
- Betty Yee, California Democratic Party vice chair (2021–present) and former California State Controller (2015–2023) (remained on ballot; endorsed Steyer)
- Michael Younger, vice president of Calbright College (2021–present) and former deputy secretary of the California Labor and Workforce Development Agency (2019–2021)

==== Declined ====
- Rob Bonta, California Attorney General (2021–present) (running for re-election)
- Laphonza Butler, former U.S. senator (2023–2024)
- Rick Caruso, founder of Caruso and runner-up for mayor of Los Angeles in 2022 (endorsed Mahan)
- Kamala Harris, former vice president of the United States (2021–2025), former U.S. senator (2017–2021), and nominee for president in 2024
- Alex Padilla, U.S. senator (2021–present)
- Adam Schiff, U.S. senator (2024–present) (initially endorsed Swalwell; then Becerra)
- Buffy Wicks, state assemblymember from the 14th district (2018–present)

=== Republican Party ===
==== Advanced to general ====
- Steve Hilton, political commentator and former adviser to UK prime minister David Cameron (2010–2012)

==== Eliminated in primary ====
- Ché Ahn, pastor (write-in)
- James Athans Jr., real estate agent
- Chad Bianco, Riverside County Sheriff-Coroner (2019–present)
- Patricia De Luca Basualdo, real estate broker
- Randeep Dhillon, businessman and farmer
- Rafael Hernandez, businessman
- Alicia Olivia Lapp
- Leo Naranjo IV, veteran
- Tim Nelson, diplomat
- Gretha Solórzano, retired nuclear engineer
- Leo Zacky, vice president of Zacky Farms and candidate for governor in 2021 and 2022
- David Zickefoose, real estate investor

==== Disqualified ====
- Brandon Jones, marketing agency founder
- Jimmy Parker, former judge
- Ebony Taylor, business owner

==== Withdrawn ====
- Sophia Brink, legislative aide to San Mateo County supervisor David Canepa (endorsed Hilton)
- Kyle Langford, construction manager (ran for CA-26 as a Democrat)
- David Serpa, real estate business owner and runner-up for California's 39th congressional district in 2024
- Jon Slavet, tech entrepreneur

==== Declined ====
- Mel Gibson, special ambassador to Hollywood (2025–present), actor, and filmmaker
- Richard Grenell, special presidential envoy for special missions (2025–present)
- Kevin McCarthy, former speaker of the U.S. House of Representatives (2023) from California's 20th congressional district (2007–2023)

=== Peace and Freedom Party ===
==== Eliminated in primary ====
- Ramsey Robinson, school social worker (Note: Robinson is a member of both the Peace and Freedom Party and the Party for Socialism and Liberation.)

=== Green Party ===
==== Eliminated in primary ====
- Butch Ware, associate professor and nominee for vice president in 2024 (write-in)

=== Libertarian Party ===
==== Withdrawn ====
- Tom Woodard, retired CEO (endorsed Hilton, remained on ballot)

==== Not on primary ballot ====
- Nicholas Thompson, college student

==== Declined ====
- Art Olivier, former mayor of Bellflower

=== No party preference ===
==== Eliminated in primary ====
- Naomi Bar-Lev, musician and writer
- Joseph Cabrera, administrator
- Elaine Culotti, entrepreneur
- Michael J. Dilger (write-in)
- LivingForGod AndCountry DeMott, chaplain
- Serge Fiankan, real estate broker
- Lukasz Adam Filinski
- Max Fomin, business owner
- Sean Forbes (write-in)
- Don Grundmann, chiropractor
- Jon Henderson, business owner
- Lewis Herms
- Dawit Kellel
- Anne Komarovsk, communications executive
- Dirk Langer (write-in)
- Duane Terrence Loynes Jr., nominee of the American Solidarity Party
- Amanda Martin, entrepreneur
- Brent Maupin, civil engineer
- Daniel Mercuri, author, Republican candidate for governor in 2021 and 2022, and candidate for California's 25th congressional district in 2020
- Mauro Alberto Orozco, business owner
- Reza Safarnejad, business owner
- Sam Sandak, filmmaker
- Christine Sarmiento, public health nurse
- Frederic Schultz, human rights attorney
- Margaret Trowe, hospitality worker
- Nancy Young, businesswoman

==== Not on primary ballot ====
- Leonard Jackson, shipping company CEO
- Ryan Tillman, police officer
- David Thelen, blogger

==== Declined ====
- Nicole Shanahan, attorney and running mate of Robert F. Kennedy Jr. in the 2024 presidential election

== Primary election ==
=== Campaign ===
Sixty-one candidates qualified for the primary ballot. California uses a top-two primary system in which all candidates, regardless of party, appear on the same ballot, with the top two advancing to the general election.

Among Republicans, Riverside County sheriff Chad Bianco and political commentator Steve Hilton emerged as the leading candidates, while the Democratic field remained fragmented. This raised concerns that two Republicans could advance to the general election. Those concerns eased after President Donald Trump endorsed Hilton, increasing the chance of a Democrat making it into the runoff because some Bianco supporters would likely shift their support to Hilton due to Trump's endorsement.

Before Swalwell's exit from the race, polls showed that the three Democrats with the greatest amount of public support were representative Eric Swalwell, hedge fund manager and 2020 presidential candidate Tom Steyer, and former representative Katie Porter. Other notable Democrats running included former mayor of Los Angeles Antonio Villaraigosa, former HHS Secretary and state attorney general Xavier Becerra, mayor of San Jose Matt Mahan, and superintendent of public instruction Tony Thurmond. Former Vice President Kamala Harris and U.S. Sen. Alex Padilla opted against running for governor, despite speculation by the media to the contrary.

==== Eric Swalwell sexual assault allegations ====
On April 10, 2026, the San Francisco Chronicle reported allegations from a former staffer who provided credible claims that Swalwell had sexually assaulted her on two occasions. That same day, CNN published additional claims from four women, including one allegation of rape and others describing inappropriate conduct and unsolicited nude photos. CNN reported that it had corroborated the accounts. Swalwell denied all of the allegations and sent cease-and-desist letters to two of the women threatening legal action.

Following the allegations, several staff members resigned from Eric Swalwell's campaign, including co-chairs Jimmy Gomez and Adam Gray. The California Teachers Association revoked its endorsement, while U.S. Senators Adam Schiff and Ruben Gallego also withdrew their support. House Minority Leader Hakeem Jeffries and former Speaker of the House Nancy Pelosi called on Swalwell to end his campaign. By April 11, all of Swalwell's 21 fellow members of Congress previously endorsing him had withdrawn their support. The following day, he announced that he was suspending his campaign for governor. On April 13, Swalwell announced he had plans to resign from Congress, and formally left on April 14.

=== Endorsements ===
Xavier Becerra (D)

U.S. representatives

- Salud Carbajal, CA-24 (2017–present)
- Tony Cárdenas, former CA-29 (2013–2025)
- Gil Cisneros, CA-31 (2025–present) and former CA-39 (2019–2021)
- Jim Clyburn, former House majority whip (2007–2011, 2019–2023) from SC-06 (1993–present)
- Jasmine Crockett, TX-30 (2023–present)
- Ted Lieu, CA-36 (2015–present)
- Raul Ruiz, CA-25 (2013–present)
- Mark Takano, CA-39 (2013–present)

State legislators

- David Alvarez, AD-80 (2020–present) (previously endorsed Atkins)
- Joaquin Arambula, AD-31 (2016–present)
- Bob Archuleta, SD-30 (2018–present) (co-endorsement with Villaraigosa; previously endorsed Atkins)
- Juan Carrillo, AD-39 (2022–present)
- Sabrina Cervantes, SD-31 (2024–present)
- Mike Fong, AD-49 (2022–present) (previously endorsed Swalwell)
- John Harabedian, AD-41 (2024–present)
- Melissa Hurtado, SD-16 (2018–present)
- Jerry McNerney, SD-05 (2024–present) and former CA-09 (2007–2023)
- Stephanie Nguyen, AD-10 (2020–present)
- Blanca Pacheco, AD-64 (2022–present)
- Darshana Patel, AD-76 (2024–present)
- Rhodesia Ransom, AD-13 (2024–present)
- Eloise Reyes, SD-29 (2024–present)
- Robert A. Rivas, speaker of the state assembly (2023–present) from AD-29 (2018–present)
- Celeste Rodriguez, AD-43 (2024–present)
- Michelle Rodriguez, AD-53 (2024–present)
- Blanca Rubio, AD-48 (2016–present)
- Pilar Schiavo, AD-40 (2022–present)
- Catherine Stefani, AD-19 (2024–present)
- Lori Wilson, AD-11 (2022–present)
- Rick Zbur, AD-51 (2022–present) (previously endorsed Steyer and Yee)
- 6 other state legislators
- ~~Sharon Quirk-Silva, AD-67 (2022–present) and former AD-65 (2012–2014, 2016–2022)~~ (endorsed Steyer)

Local officials

- Luis Alejo, Monterey County supervisor from the 1st district (2017–present)
- Sukhee Kang, former mayor of Irvine (2008–2012)
- Adrin Nazarian, Los Angeles city councilmember from the 2nd district (2023–present)
- Rex Richardson, mayor of Long Beach (2022–present)
- Mary Salas, former mayor of Chula Vista (2014–2022)

Individuals

- Dolores Huerta, labor leader

Labor unions

- California Faculty Association (co-endorsement with Thurmond)
- California State Council of Laborers
- ILWU Southern California District Council
- Laborers' International Union of North America
- Service Employees International Union California (previously endorsed Swalwell; co-endorsement with Steyer)
- Union of American Physicians and Dentists

Organizations

- Alice B. Toklas LGBTQ Democratic Club (previously endorsed Yee)
- California Young Democrats
- California Medical Association (previously endorsed Swalwell)
- Coalition for Humane Immigrant Rights of Los Angeles
- Equality California (previously declined to endorse)
- Los Angeles County Young Democrats
- Planned Parenthood Affiliates of California
- Stonewall Young Democrats

Newspapers

- The Independent
- San Francisco Examiner
Chad Bianco (R)

Executive branch officials

- Bill Essayli, first assistant U.S. attorney for the Central District of California (2025–present)

U.S. representatives

- Mary Bono, former CA-45 (1998–2013)
- Ken Calvert, CA-41 (1993–present)
- Darrell Issa, CA-48 (2023–present), CA-50 (2021–2023)

State legislators

- Dennis Hollingsworth, former SD-36 (2002–2010)
- Kelly Seyarto, SD-32 (2022–present)
- Scott Wilk, former SD-21 (2016–2024)
- Juan Alanis, AD-22 (2022–present)
- Leticia Castillo, AD-58 (2024–present)
- Phillip Chen, AD-59 (2016–present)
- Jordan Cunningham, former AD-35 (2016–2022)
- Laurie Davies, AD-74 (2020–present)
- Diane Dixon, AD-72 (2022–present)
- Heath Flora, minority leader of the California Assembly (2025–present) from AD-09 (2022–present) and AD-12 (2016–2022)
- Heather Hadwick, AD-01 (2024–present)
- Tom Lackey, AD-34 (2022–present)
- Joe Patterson, AD-05 (2022–present)
- Kate Sanchez, AD-71 (2022–present)
- Tri Ta, AD-70 (2022–present)
- Greg Wallis, AD-47 (2022–present)
- Devon Mathis, former AD-26 (2014–2022) and AD-33 (2022–2024)

Local officials

- Don Barnes, sheriff-coroner of Orange County (2019–present)
- Curt Hagman, San Bernardino County supervisor from the 4th district (2014–present)
- Paul Miyamoto, sheriff of San Francisco (2020–present) (Democratic)

Individuals

- Lorenzo Lamas, actor and producer
- Royce Gracie, professional MMA fighter
- Dan Henderson, professional MMA fighter and wrestler
- Jeremy McGrath, professional motocross and supercross racer
- Tito Ortiz, former professional MMA fighter
- John Ratzenberger, actor

Organizations

- California Rifle & Pistol Association

Political parties

- American Independent Party of California
Steve Hilton (R)

Executive branch officials

- Donald Trump, president of the United States (2017–2021, 2025–present)
- JD Vance, vice president of the United States (2025–present)
- Jon Voight, special ambassador to Hollywood (2025–present)

U.S. representatives

- Kevin Kiley, CA-03 (2023–present) (independent) (Note: Reregistered in 2026 as an independent after having been a Republican throughout his political career. In spite of the switch, he remained a member of the House Republican Conference.)
- Tom McClintock, CA-05 (2009–present)

State legislators

- Gloria Romero, former majority leader of the California Senate (2005–2008) from SD-24 (2001–2010) (candidate's running mate) (Note: California holds separate elections for governor and lieutenant governor, but Romero and Hilton have declared that they are running on a "joint ticket".)
- Tony Strickland, SD-36 (2008–2012, 2025–present)

Individuals

- Lanhee Chen, member of the Amtrak Board of Directors (2024–present) (candidate's policy advisor)
- Charlie Kirk, founder of Turning Point USA (deceased)
- Phil Mickelson, professional golfer
- Spencer Pratt, reality TV star and 2026 Los Angeles mayoral candidate
- Vivek Ramaswamy, entrepreneur and 2026 Ohio gubernatorial nominee

Organizations

- California College Republicans
- Howard Jarvis Taxpayers Association
- Reform California
Alicia Olivia Lapp (R)

Organizations

- Anti-Zionist America PAC
Matt Mahan (D)

U.S. representatives

- Ami Bera, CA-6 (2013–present) (previously endorsed Swalwell)
- Sam Liccardo, CA-16 (2025–present)
- Adam Smith, WA-9 (1997–present)

Statewide officials

- Jared Polis, governor of Colorado (2019–present)

State legislators

- Catherine Blakespear, SD-38 (2022–present)
- Maggy Krell, AD-06 (2024–present)

County officials

- Jim Cooper, sheriff of Sacramento County (2022–present)
- Matt Dorsey, San Francisco supervisor from the 6th district (2022–present)
- Joel Engardio, former San Francisco supervisor from the 4th district (2023–2025)
- Dave Pine, former San Mateo County supervisor from the 1st district (2011–2025)

Individuals

- George Arison, co-founder and CEO of Grindr
- Brian Armstrong, CEO of Coinbase
- David Baszucki, co-founder of the Roblox Corporation
- Nathan Blecharczyk, co-founder of Airbnb
- Sergey Brin, co-founder of Alphabet Inc. and Google
- Brook Byers, senior partner at Kleiner Perkins
- Rick Caruso, founder of Caruso and runner-up for mayor of Los Angeles in 2022
- Patrick Collison, CEO of Stripe
- Scott Cook, co-founder of Intuit
- David Crane, lecturer
- Dylan Field, co-founder of Figma
- Joe Green, co-founder of Causes and Treehouse Co-Living
- Grimes, musician and former partner of Elon Musk
- Reed Hastings, co-founder and former CEO of Netflix
- Reid Hoffman, co-founder of LinkedIn
- Drew Houston, CEO of Dropbox
- Steve Huffman, CEO of Reddit
- Steve Jurvetson, venture capitalist
- Vinod Khosla, co-founder of Sun Microsystems
- Jeremy Liew, retired venture capitalist
- Joe Lonsdale, co-founder of Palantir
- David A. Marcus, co-creator of Diem and former president of PayPal
- Neil Mehta, venture capitalist
- Marc Merrill, co-founder of Riot Games
- Tim Miller, political consultant and writer
- Michael Moritz, venture capitalist
- William Oberndorf, hedge fund manager
- John Pritzker, investor and son of Jay Pritzker
- Lisa Rinna, television personality
- Ruchi Sanghvi, co-founder of South Park Commons
- Michael Seibel, co-founder of Justin.tv and Socialcam
- Thomas Siebel, founder of Siebel Systems
- Jamie Siminoff, founder of Ring
- Brian Singerman, partner emeritus at Founders Fund
- John A. Sobrato, real estate developer
- Evan Spiegel, CEO of Snap Inc.
- Harj Taggar, group partner at Y Combinator
- Garry Tan, CEO of Y Combinator
- Kyle Vogt, co-founder of Cruise Automation
- Chris Wanstrath, co-founder of Github
- Tony Xu, CEO of DoorDash
- Andrew Yang, Forward Party founder and 2020 presidential candidate

Organizations

- GrowSF
- Majority Democrats
- The NewDEAL
Katie Porter (D)

Executive branch officials

- Jon Favreau, White House Director of Speechwriting (2009–2013), co-founder of Crooked Media, and co-host of Pod Save America

U.S. senators

- Elizabeth Warren, Massachusetts (2013–present)

U.S. representatives

- Robert Garcia, CA-42 (2023–present)
- Dave Min, CA-47 (2025–present)
- Derek Tran, CA-45 (2025–present)

State legislators

- Cottie Petrie-Norris, AD-73 (2018–present)

Labor unions

- Amalgamated Transit Union
- California Conference of Machinists
- California Federation of Labor Unions (co-endorsement with Steyer and Villaraigosa; initially included Swalwell)
- Communications Workers of America District 9
- International Association of Sheet Metal, Air, Rail and Transportation Workers Western States Council
- International Brotherhood of Electrical Workers Local 441
- International Brotherhood of Teamsters California
- National Union of Healthcare Workers
- Orange County Employees Association
- United Auto Workers Region 6

Organizations

- California Environmental Voters (co-endorsement with Steyer)
- EMILYs List
- End Citizens United
- Elect Democratic Women
- National Women's Political Caucus
- Vote Mama

Newspapers and media

- Bay Area Reporter
- McClatchy Media California (Note: McClatchy Media owns The Sacramento Bee, The Modesto Bee, The Fresno Bee, Merced Sun-Star, and The Tribune)
- Merced Sun-Star
- The Sacramento Bee
- San Francisco Chronicle
Ramsey Robinson (PFP)

Political parties

- Peace and Freedom Party
Tom Steyer (D)

Executive branch officials

- Robert Reich, former U.S. secretary of labor (1993–1997)
- John Podesta, former White House chief of staff (1998–2001) and senior advisor to the president for international climate policy (2024–2025)
- Ali Zaidi, former White House national climate advisor (2022–2025)

U.S. senators

- Sheldon Whitehouse, Rhode Island (2007–present)

U.S. representatives

- Jared Huffman, CA-2 (2013–present)
- Ro Khanna, CA-17 (2017–present)
- Lateefah Simon, CA-12 (2025–present)

Statewide officials

- Betty Yee, former state controller of California (2015–2023) and former gubernatorial candidate

State legislators

- Toni Atkins, former gubernatorial candidate and president pro tempore of the California State Senate (2018–2024) from SD-39 (2016–2024)
- Steve Bennett, AD-38 (2020–present)
- Tasha Boerner, AD-77 (2018–present) (previously endorsed Atkins and Swalwell)
- Isaac Bryan, former majority leader of the California Assembly (2023) from AD-55 (2021–present)
- Gregg Hart, AD-37 (2022–present)
- Corey Jackson, AD-60 (2022–present) (previously endorsed Swalwell)
- Alex Lee, AD-24 (2020–present)
- Tina McKinnor, AD-61 (2022–present) (co-endorsement with Villaraigosa; previously endorsed Swalwell and Atkins)
- Caroline Menjivar, SD-20 (2022–present)
- Ash Kalra, AD-25 (2016–present)
- Liz Ortega, AD-20 (2022–present)
- Sharon Quirk-Silva, AD-67 (2022–present) and former AD-65 (2012–2014, 2016–2022) (previously endorsed Becerra)
- LaShae Sharp-Collins, AD-79 (2024–present) (previously endorsed Atkins; co-endorsement with Thurmond)
- Nick Schultz, AD-44 (2024–present) (previously endorsed Swalwell)
- Lola Smallwood-Cuevas, SD-28 (2022–present)
- Henry Stern, SD-27 (2016–present)
- Chris Ward, former speaker pro tempore of the California State Assembly (2022–2023) from AD-78 (2020–present) (previously endorsed Atkins)
- ~~Rick Zbur, AD-51 (2022–present)~~ (endorsed Yee, then Becerra)

Local officials

- Willie Brown, former mayor of San Francisco (1996–2004)
- Adena Ishii, mayor of Berkeley (2024–present)

Individuals

- Michael Brune, former executive director of the Sierra Club
- Bill McKibben, environmentalist
- Jane Fonda, actress and climate activist
- Rebecca Solnit, writer and activist
- Susie Tompkins Buell, entrepeneur
- Carlos Eduardo Espina, content creator and activist
- Jon Lovett, co-founder of Crooked Media and co-host of Pod Save America
- Cenk Uygur, The Young Turks host, co-founder
- Tommy Vietor, co-founder of Crooked Media and co-host of Pod Save America

Labor unions

- AFSCME Local 3299
- California School Employees Association
- California Nurses Association
- California Federation of Teachers
- California Federation of Labor Unions (co-endorsement with Porter and Villaraigosa; initially included Swalwell)
- California Teachers Association (previously endorsed Swalwell)
- International Alliance of Theatrical Stage Employees
- IFPTE Local 21
- Service Employees International Union California (previously endorsed Swalwell; co-endorsement with Becerra)
- United Domestic Workers
- UNITE HERE

Organizations

- Abundant Housing LA
- California Environmental Voters (co-endorsement with Porter)
- Center for Biological Diversity
- Council on American–Islamic Relations
- Courage California
- Food & Water Action
- Jane Fonda Climate PAC
- Natural Resources Defense Council
- Our Revolution
- Progressive Victory
- Sierra Club
- Third Act California
- YIMBY Action

Newspapers

- San Francisco Bay Guardian
- Santa Barbara Independent
- Sun-Reporter
Tony Thurmond (D)

U.S. representatives

- Laura Friedman, CA-30 (2025–present)

State legislators

- ~~Ian Calderon, former majority leader of the California Assembly (2016–2020) from AD-57 (2012–2020)~~ (entered race in September 2025) (Note: Calderon endorsed Swalwell after dropping out of the race, but rescinded his endorsement in April 2026 in light of sexual assault allegations from a former staffer.)
- Sabrina Cervantes, SD-31 (2024–present)
- Anamarie Avila Farias, AD-15 (2024–present)
- Jackie Goldberg, former AD-45 (2000–2006)
- LaShae Sharp-Collins, AD-79 (2024–present) (previously endorsed Atkins; co-endorsement with Steyer)
- Akilah Weber, SD-39 (2024–present) (previously endorsed Atkins)

Local officials

- Barbara Lee, mayor of Oakland (2025–present)

Labor unions

- California Faculty Association (co-endorsement with Becerra)
- International Brotherhood of Boilermakers Local 92
- International Brotherhood of Electrical Workers Local 551
- UA Plumbers and Steamfitters Local 398

Organizations

- Black Women Organized for Political Action
- Harvey Milk LGBTQ Democratic Club
Antonio Villaraigosa (D)

U.S. senators

- Barbara Boxer, former U.S. senator from California (1993–2017) (campaign co-chair; previously endorsed Kounalakis)

U.S. representatives

- Lucille Roybal-Allard, former CA-40 (1993–2023)
- Diane Watson, former CA-33 (2001–2011)

Statewide officials

- Cruz Bustamante, former lieutenant governor of California (1999–2007)

State legislators

- Bob Archuleta, SD-32 (2018–present) (co-endorsement with Becerra; previously endorsed Atkins)
- Wendy Carrillo, former AD-52 (2017–2024)
- María Elena Durazo, SD-26 (2018–present)
- Dean Florez, former SD-16 (2002–2010)
- Tina McKinnor, AD-61 (2022–present) (initially a co-endorsement with Swalwell; previously endorsed Atkins; co-endorsement with Steyer)
- Fabian Núñez, former speaker of the California State Assembly (2004–2008) from AD-46 (2002–2008)
- John Pérez, former speaker of the California State Assembly (2010–2014) from AD-53 (2008–2014)
- Esmeralda Soria, AD-27 (2022–present)
- Art Torres, former SD-24 (1982–1994)

Local officials

- Ashleigh Aitken, mayor of Anaheim (2022–present)
- Karen Bass, mayor of Los Angeles (2022–present)
- Bob Blumenfield, Los Angeles city councilmember from the 3rd district (2013–present)
- James T. Butts Jr., mayor of Inglewood (2011–present) (Independent)
- Jerry Dyer, mayor of Fresno (2021–present) (Republican)
- Marqueece Harris-Dawson, president of the Los Angeles City Council (2024–present) from the 8th district (2015–present)
- Heather Hutt, Los Angeles city councilmember from the 10th district (2022–present)
- Fred Keeley, mayor of Santa Cruz (2023–present) (co-endorsement with Yee)
- Tim McOsker, Los Angeles city councilmember from the 15th district (2022–present)
- R. Rex Parris, mayor of Lancaster (2008–present) (Republican)
- Curren Price, Los Angeles city councilmember from the 9th district (2013–present)

Labor unions

- California State United Association
- International Brotherhood of Electrical Workers California State Association
- International Union of Operating Engineers Locals 3, 12, 39 and 501
- State Building and Construction Trades Council of California
- Teamsters Local 348
- California Federation of Labor Unions (co-endorsement with Steyer and Porter; initially included Swalwell)

Newspapers

- Los Angeles Sentinel
Butch Ware (G) (write-in candidate)

State legislators

- Nina Turner, former state senator from Ohio's 25th district (2008–2014) (Democratic)

Individuals

- Guy Christensen, pro-Palestinian activist and social media influencer
- Angelica Ross, actress and transgender rights advocate (candidate's communication director)

Political parties

- Green Party of California
- Santa Clara County Green Party

Newspapers

- San Francisco Bay View
Ché Ahn (R) (write-in candidate)

Individuals

- Bill Johnson, senior pastor of Bethel Church
- Stephen Strang, founder of Charisma

Organizations

- Don't Mess With My Children
Toni Atkins (D) (withdrawn)

U.S. representatives

- ~~Scott Peters, CA-50 (2013–present)~~ (endorsed Swalwell after Atkins withdrew)
- Juan Vargas, CA-52 (2013–present)

Statewide officials

- Tina Kotek, governor of Oregon (2023–present)
- Shirley Weber, secretary of state of California (2021–present)

State legislators

- Cecilia Aguiar-Curry, majority leader of the California State Assembly (2023–present) from AD-04 (2016–present)
- ~~David Alvarez, AD-80 (2020–present)~~ (endorsed Becerra after Atkins withdrew)
- ~~Bob Archuleta, SD-32 (2018–present)~~ (endorsed Villaraigosa and Becerra after Atkins withdrew)
- Catherine Blakespear, SD-38 (2022–present)
- ~~Tasha Boerner, AD-77 (2018–present)~~ (endorsed Swalwell after Atkins withdrew; endorsement rescinded, later endorsed Steyer)
- Susan Eggman, SD-05 (2020–2024)
- Jacqui Irwin, AD-42 (2014–present)
- Christine Kehoe, SD-39 (2004–2012)
- John Laird, SD-17 (2020–present)
- Brian Maienschein, AD-76 (2012–2024)
- ~~Tina McKinnor, AD-61 (2022–present)~~ (endorsed Villaraigosa after Atkins withdrew)
- Caroline Menjivar, SD-20 (2022–present)
- Mike McGuire, SD-02 (2024–present)
- Steve Padilla, SD-18 (2022–present)
- ~~Gail Pellerin, AD-28 (2022–present)~~ (endorsed Yee after Atkins withdrew)
- Richard Roth, SD-31 (2012–2024)
- ~~LaShae Sharp-Collins, AD-79 (2024–present)~~ (endorsed Thurmond after Atkins withdrew)
- Tom Umberg, SD-34 (2018–present)
- ~~Chris Ward, former Speaker pro tempore of the California State Assembly (2022–2023) from AD-78 (2020–present)~~ (endorsed Steyer after Atkins withdrew)
- ~~Akilah Weber, SD-39 (2024–present)~~ (endorsed Thurmond after Atkins withdrew)
- Scott Wiener, SD-11 (2016–present)

Local officials

- 8/9 members of the San Diego City Council (Note: When the article was published, San Diego had 8 city councilors, all 8 of whom endorsed Atkins. A ninth councilor was sworn in after the 2024 election.)
- Paloma Aguirre, San Diego supervisor from the 1st district (2025–present)
- Todd Gloria, mayor of San Diego (2013–2014, 2020–present)
- Terra Lawson-Remer, San Diego County supervisor from the 3rd district (2021–present)
- Holly Mitchell, Los Angeles County supervisor from the 2nd district (2020–present)
- Cori Schumacher, former Carlsbad city councilor from the 1st district (2016–2021)

Labor unions

- International Brotherhood of Electrical Workers Local 569
- Western States Regional Council of Carpenters

Organizations

- California Legislative LGBTQ Caucus
- LPAC
- San Diego County Young Democrats
- San Diego Stonewall Democrats
Eleni Kounalakis (D) (withdrawn)

Executive branch officials

- Roberta Achtenberg, former member of the U.S. Commission on Civil Rights (2011–2016)
- Hillary Clinton, former U.S. secretary of state (2009–2013), U.S. senator from New York (2001–2009), and U.S. First Lady (1993–2001)

U.S. senators

- ~~Barbara Boxer, former U.S. senator from California (1993–2017)~~ (endorsed Villaraigosa after Kounalakis withdrew)

U.S. representatives

- Nancy Pelosi, CA-11 (1987–present)

State legislators

- Bill Dodd, SD-03 (2016–2024)
- ~~Jacqui Irwin, AD-42 (2014–present)~~ (endorsed Atkins after Kounalakis withdrew)
- Evan Low, AD-26 (2014–2024)
- Diane Papan, AD-21 (2022–present)

Local officials

- Art Agnos, former mayor of San Francisco (1988–1992)
- Kevin McCarty, mayor of Sacramento (2024–present)
Zoltan Istvan (D) (withdrawn)

Political parties

- U.S. Transhumanist Party (founded by candidate)
Eric Swalwell (D) (withdrawn, appeared on the ballot)

U.S. senators

- ~~Ruben Gallego, Arizona (2025–present)~~ (endorsement rescinded)
- ~~Adam Schiff, California (2025–present)~~ (endorsement rescinded)

U.S. representatives

- ~~Nanette Barragán, CA-44 (2017–present)~~ (endorsement rescinded)
- ~~Ami Bera, CA-6 (2013–present)~~ (endorsement rescinded; later endorsed Mahan)
- ~~Julia Brownley, CA-26 (2013–present)~~ (endorsement rescinded)
- ~~Gil Cisneros, CA-31 (2025–present) and former CA-39 (2019–2021)~~ (endorsement rescinded)
- ~~Lou Correa, CA-46 (2017–present)~~ (endorsement rescinded)
- ~~Adam Gray, CA-13 (2025–present)~~ (endorsement rescinded)
- ~~Jimmy Gomez, CA-34 (2017–present)~~ (endorsement rescinded)
- ~~Adelita Grijalva, AZ-07 (2025–present)~~ (endorsement rescinded)
- ~~Sydney Kamlager-Dove, CA-37 (2023–present)~~ (endorsement rescinded)
- ~~Ted Lieu, CA–36 (2013–present)~~ (endorsement rescinded)
- ~~Zoe Lofgren, CA-18 (1995–present)~~ (endorsement rescinded)
- ~~Doris Matsui, CA-07 (2005–present)~~ (endorsement rescinded)
- ~~Jared Moskowitz, FL-23 (2023–present)~~ (endorsement rescinded)
- ~~Kevin Mullin, CA-15 (2023–present)~~ (endorsement rescinded)
- ~~Jimmy Panetta, CA-19 (2017–present)~~ (endorsement rescinded)
- ~~Scott Peters, CA-50 (2013–present)~~ (endorsement rescinded)
- ~~Raul Ruiz, CA-25 (2013–present)~~ (endorsement rescinded; later endorsed Becerra)
- ~~Linda Sánchez, CA-38 (2003–present)~~ (endorsement rescinded)
- ~~Mike Thompson, CA-04 (1999–present)~~ (endorsement rescinded)

State legislators

- ~~Patrick Ahrens, AD-26 (2024–present)~~ (endorsement rescinded)
- ~~Tasha Boerner, AD-77 (2018–present)~~ (previously endorsed Atkins; endorsement rescinded; later endorsed Steyer)
- ~~Mike Fong, AD-49 (2022–present)~~ (endorsement rescinded; later endorsed Becerra)
- ~~Corey Jackson, AD-60 (2022–present)~~ (endorsement rescinded; later endorsed Steyer)
- ~~Nick Schultz, AD-44 (2024–present)~~ (endorsement rescinded; later endorsed Steyer)
- ~~Ian Calderon, former majority leader of the California Assembly (2016–2020) from AD-57 (2012–2020) and former gubernatorial candidate~~ (previously endorsed Thurmond; endorsement later rescinded)

Local officials

- ~~Caroline Torosis, mayor of Santa Monica (2022–present)~~ (endorsement rescinded)

Individuals

- ~~Stephen Cloobeck, businessman and former gubernatorial candidate~~ (endorsement rescinded)

Labor unions

- ~~California Conference of Machinists~~ (endorsement rescinded)
- ~~California Teachers Association~~ (endorsement rescinded; later endorsed Steyer)
- ~~California Professional Firefighters~~ (endorsement rescinded)
- ~~Service Employees International Union California~~ (endorsement rescinded; later co-endorsed Becerra and Steyer)
- ~~California Federation of Labor Unions~~ (endorsement rescinded)

Organizations

- ~~California Dental Association~~ (endorsement rescinded)
- ~~California Medical Association~~ (endorsement rescinded; later endorsed Becerra)
Betty Yee (D) (withdrawn, appeared on the ballot)

U.S. representatives

- Sam Farr, former CA-20 (1993–2017)

State legislators

- Gail Pellerin, AD-28 (2022–present) (previously endorsed Atkins)
- ~~Rick Zbur, AD-51 (2022–present)~~ (previously endorsed Steyer; later endorsed Becerra)

Local officials

- Ron Galperin, former city controller of Los Angeles (2013–2022)
- Fred Keeley, mayor of Santa Cruz (2023–present) (co-endorsement with Villaraigosa)
- Lisa Middleton, former mayor of Palm Springs (2021–2022)
- Holly Mitchell, chair pro tempore of Los Angeles County (2020–2021, 2025–present) from the 2nd district (2020–present)
- Aaron Peskin, former member of the San Francisco Board of Supervisors from the 3rd district (2001–2009, 2015–2025)
- Raj Salwan, mayor of Fremont (2024–present)

Individuals

- Ann Ravel, former member of the Federal Election Commission (2013–2017)

Organizations

- AAPI Victory Fund
- ~~Alice B. Toklas LGBTQ Democratic Club~~ (later endorsed Becerra)
- National Women's Political Caucus of California
- Progressive Democrats of America
- Progressive Democrats of California
Declined to endorse

Executive branch officials

- Joe Biden, former president of the United States (2021–2025)
- Alejandro Mayorkas, former United States Secretary of Homeland Security (2021–2025)

Statewide officials

- Gavin Newsom, governor of California (2019–present)

Organizations

- ~~Equality California~~ (later endorsed Becerra)

Political parties

- California Democratic Party
- California Republican Party

=== Fundraising ===
Campaign finance reports as of May 31, 2026
Candidate	Raised	Spent	Cash on Hand
Xavier Becerra (D)	$6,051,826	$9,290,232	$793,630
Chad Bianco (R)	$2,295,579	$3,328,860	$952,192
Steve Hilton (R)	$7,332,985	$8,483,462	$1,724,547
Matt Mahan (D)	$15,007,412	$10,367,538	$5,021,023
Katie Porter (D)	$4,206,459	$6,959,945	$764,830
Tom Steyer (D)	$164,592,445	$166,766,233	$1,286,407

=== Debates ===
2026 California gubernatorial primary debate
No.	Date	Host	Moderator	Link	Democratic	Democratic	Democratic	Democratic	Democratic	Democratic	Democratic	Democratic	Democratic	Democratic	Republican	Republican
Key: P Participant I Invited W Withdrawn A Absent N Not invited																
Key: P Participant I Invited W Withdrawn A Absent N Not invited					Becerra	Mahan	Steyer	Thurmond	Villaraigosa	Yee	Swalwell	Porter	Atkins	Kounalakis	Hilton	Bianco
1	Sep. 29, 2024	NUHW; Los Angeles Times; AP, Politico	Laurel Rosenhall; Lisa Matthews; Melanie Mason	YouTube	A	A	A	P	A	P	A	A	P	P	A	A
2	Feb. 3, 2026	Black Action Alliance; KTVU; KTTV	Greg Lee; Andre Senior; Marla Tellez	YouTube	P	P	P	P	P	P	A (Note: Did not attend due to the January–February 2026 United States federal government shutdown)	A	W	W	P	A
3	Feb. 26, 2026	Jewish California	Alex Cohen	YouTube	A	P	P	N	P	N	P	A	W	W	P	A
4	Apr. 22, 2026	Nexstar Media Group; NewsNation; The Hill	Nikki Laurenzo; Frank Buckley	YouTube	P	P	P	N	N	W	W	P	W	W	P	P
5	Apr. 28, 2026	Asian Pacific American Public Affairs; CBS California; Pomona College	Pat Harvey; Ryan Yamamoto; Tony Lopez; Julie Watts; Sara Sadhwani	YouTube	P	P	P	P	P	W	W	P	W	W	P	P
6	May 5, 2026	CNN	Elex Michaelson; Kaitlan Collins	–	P	P	P	N	P	W	W	P	W	W	P	P
7	May 6, 2026	KNBC; KVEA	Colleen Williams; Conan Nolan; Enrique Chiabra	YouTube	P	P	P	N	P	W	W	P	W	W	P	P
8	May 14, 2026	CBS News; San Francisco Examiner	Schuyler Hudak Prionas; Tom Wait; Ryan Yamamoto	YouTube	P	P	P	N	P	W	W	P	W	W	P	P

==== Canceled debate ====
A debate scheduled for March 24, 2026, hosted by the USC Center for the Political Future, KABC-TV, and KMEX-DT, was ultimately canceled hours before it was set to begin. Using a formula developed by USC political science professor Christian R. Grose that combined fundraising and polling data, only six candidates were invited: Republicans Bianco and Hilton, and Democrats Mahan, Porter, Steyer, and Swalwell. The selection drew criticism from chairs of the black and Latino caucuses, particularly because no nonwhite candidates qualified and because Mahan's strong fundraising offset weaker polling. USC and over 50 scholars defended the formula, but the debate was canceled after organizers could not agree to expand the field.

=== Polling ===
Source of poll aggregation	Dates administered	Dates updated	Xavier Becerra (D)	Chad Bianco (R)	Steve Hilton (R)	Matt Mahan (D)	Katie Porter (D)	Tom Steyer (D)	Antonio Villaraigosa (D)	Other/ Undecided (Note: Calculated by taking the difference of 100% and all other candidates combined.)	Margin
270toWin	May 14–31, 2026	June 2, 2026	24.0%	11.0%	22.3%	5.1%	7.3%	19.9%	2.7%	7.7% (Note: Tony Thurmond (D) at 1.3%)	Becerra +1.7%
Decision Desk HQ	through May 28, 2026	June 1, 2026	24.4%	10.8%	23.4%	5.6%	7.1%	18.4%	2.0%	8.3%	Becerra +1.0%
FiftyPlusOne	through May 28, 2026	June 1, 2026	21.6%	11.6%	22.2%	6.1%	8.1%	19.4%	—	11.0% (Note: Eric Swalwell (D) with 1.9%)	Hilton +0.6%
RealClearPolitics	May 19–31, 2026	June 1, 2026	23.6%	10.9%	22.9%	5.0%	6.8%	20.9%	2.2%	7.7%	Becerra +0.7%
Average			23.4%	11.1%	22.7%	5.5%	7.3%	19.7%	1.7%	8.6%	Becerra +0.7%

Poll source	Date(s) administered	Sample size (Note: Key: A – all adults RV – registered voters LV – likely voters V – unclear)	Margin of error	Xavier Becerra (D)	Chad Bianco (R)	Steve Hilton (R)	Matt Mahan (D)	Katie Porter (D)	Tom Steyer (D)	Eric Swalwell (D)	Tony Thurmond (D)	Antonio Villaraigosa (D)	Betty Yee (D)	Other	Undecided
SurveyUSA (Note: Poll sponsored by KGTV and The San Diego Union-Tribune)	May 28–31, 2026	1,124 (LV)	± 3.8%	17%	11%	20%	6%	7%	20%	—	2%	4%	—	1%	12%
Emerson College (Note: Poll sponsored by Inside California Politics)	May 27–28, 2026	1,000 (LV)	± 3.0%	28% (Note: With voters who lean towards a given candidate)	12%	23%	5%	5%	23%	—	1%	3%	—	1% (Note: "Someone else" with 1%)	—
Emerson College	May 27–28, 2026	1,000 (LV)	± 3.0%	28%	12%	21%	5%	5%	22%	—	1%	2%	—	1%	5%
Public Policy Polling (D) (Note: Poll sponsored by Steyer's campaign)	May 27–28, 2026	686 (LV)	± 3.7%	18%	14%	20%	7%	7%	21%	—	—	2%	—	1%	10%
McLaughlin & Associates (R) (Note: Poll sponsored by the California Post)	May 26–28, 2026	800 (LV)	± 3.5%	19%	10%	25%	6%	7%	25%	—	—	—	—	—	
David Binder Research (D) (Note: Poll sponsored by Californians for a Fighter PAC)	May 26–27, 2026	—	± 4.1%	26%	9%	27%	4%	8%	22%	—	—	—	—	—	—
Kreate Strategies	May 23–27, 2026	900 (LV)	± 3.3%	27%	9%	26%	4%	5%	20%	—	—	—	1%	2% (Note: "Someone else" with 2%)	7%
CEPP (Note: Poll sponsored by CSU Long Beach-USC-Cal Poly Pomona California Elections and Policy)	May 23–26, 2026	735 (LV)	± 3.6%	29%	11%	23%	4%	8%	18%	—	—	3%	—	3%	1%
Berkeley IGS (Note: Poll sponsored by the Los Angeles Times)	May 19–24, 2026	5,472 (LV)	± 2.0%	25%	11%	21%	4%	7%	19%	—	1%	1%	—	4%	7%
Global Strategy Group (D)	May 18–21, 2026	800 (LV)	—	19%	12%	22%	8%	8%	19%	—	1%	2%	—	—	7%
Echelon Insights (R) (Note: Poll sponsored by Hilton's campaign)	May 18–21, 2026	800 (LV)	—	15%	12%	25%	7%	7%	18%	—	—	1%	—	—	
PPIC	May 14–18, 2026	986 (LV)	± 4.1%	23%	13%	20%	7%	12%	15%	—	1%	5%	—	1%	2%
Evitarus (D) (Note: Poll sponsored by the California Democratic Party)	May 14–16, 2026	1,200 (LV)	± 2.8%	21%	10%	22%	4%	7%	15%	<1%	1%	1%	<1%	4% (Note: "Prefer not to answer" with 3%; "Some other candidate" with 1%; "Will skip that office on the ballot" with <1%)	13%
David Binder Research (D)	May 5–11, 2026	—	± 3.5%	22%	13%	23%	7%	12%	15%	—	<1%	2%	—	—	6%
Emerson College	May 9–10, 2026	1,000 (LV)	± 3.0%	20%	12%	18%	9%	13%	19%	—	1%	5%	—	2%	—
Emerson College	May 9–10, 2026	1,000 (LV)	± 3.0%	19%	11%	17%	8%	10%	17%	—	1%	4%	—	1%	12%
Kreate Strategies	May 5–9, 2026	900 (LV)	± 3.3%	20%	13%	22%	9%	9%	14%	—	—	1%	—	2%	10%
Mellman Group (D) (Note: Poll conducted for California Back to Basics PAC, which supports Mahan)	May 3–6, 2026	600 (LV)	± 4.0%	20%	14%	20%	10%	<10% (Note: "Katie Porter, Antonio Villaraigosa, and Tony Thurmond round out the field in single digits.")	12%	—	<10%	<10%	—	—	8%
Impact Research (D) (Note: Poll sponsored by Mahan's campaign)	April 28 – May 3, 2026	900 (LV)	± 3.3%	23%	11%	23%	10%	9%	14%	—	1%	1%	—	2%	6%
Evitarus (D)	April 30 – May 2, 2026	1,200 (LV)	± 2.8%	18%	14%	18%	7%	8%	12%	1%	1%	2%	1%	3% (Note: "Prefer not to answer" with 2%; "Some other candidate" with 1%; "Will skip that office on the ballot" with <1%)	14%
SurveyUSA	April 28 – May 1, 2026	991 (LV)	± 4.2%	10%	12%	20%	7%	8%	18%	—	2%	5%	—	0%	17%
Gudelunas Strategies (Note: Poll commissioned by the committee "California is Not For Sale", which opposes Steyer)	April 23–27, 2026	800 (LV)	± 3.5%	24%	13%	23%	6%	10%	15%	<1%	1%	2%	<1%	1%	5%
CBS News/YouGov	April 23–27, 2026	1,479 (LV)	± 4.1%	13%	10%	16%	4%	9%	15%	—	1%	4%	—	2%	26%
EMC Research (D) (Note: Poll sponsored by Becerra's campaign)	April 21–26, 2026	1,000 (LV)	± 3.1%	21%	14%	20%	8%	8%	17%	—	2%	3%	—	5% (Note: "Someone else" with 5%)	1%
	April 20, 2026	Yee withdraws from the race, endorses Steyer													
Independent Voter Project	April 14–20, 2026	3,404 (LV)	± 2.2%	23%	17%	20%	4%	11%	14%	—	1%	1%	1%	8%	
Gudelunas Strategies	April 14–18, 2026	800 (LV)	± 3.5%	15%	14%	20%	6%	13%	15%	<1%	2%	3%	2%	1%	10%
Kreate Strategies	April 12–18, 2026	900 (LV)	± 3.2%	10%	14%	18%	4%	10%	16%	—	—	1%	2%	—	23%
Evitarus (D)	April 15–17, 2026	1,200 (LV)	± 2.8%	13%	14%	16%	5%	10%	13%	1%	1%	2%	1%	4% (Note: "Prefer not to answer" and "Some other candidate" with 2%; "Will skip that office on the ballot" with <1%)	20%
Emerson College	April 14–15, 2026	1,000 (LV)	± 3.0%	10%	14%	17%	5%	10%	14%	—	1%	3%	1%	1%	23%
	April 12, 2026	Swalwell withdraws from the race													
Impact Research (D)	April 8–12, 2026	900 (LV)	± 3.3%	7%	10%	25%	8%	14%	16%	—	—	—	—	5%	9%
SurveyUSA	April 8–10, 2026	788 (LV)	± 5.2%	4%	8%	18%	4%	8%	21%	9%	1%	5%	4%	0%	18%
David Binder Research (D)	April 1–6, 2026	800 (LV)	± 3.5%	4%	13%	22%	5%	11%	12%	18%	2%	2%	2%	—	10%
Evitarus (D)	March 31 – April 5, 2026	1,200 (LV)	± 2.8%	4%	14%	14%	4%	7%	11%	12%	<1%	4%	1%	4%	24%
PPIC	March 26 – April 3, 2026	1,008 (LV)	± 3.9%	5%	14%	17%	5%	10%	14%	18%	2%	5%	3%	1%	5%
Kreate Strategies	March 23–29, 2026	700 (LV)	± 3.7%	2%	10%	19%	4%	8%	13%	13%	—	2%	3%	6% (Note: "Someone else" with 6%)	20%
Echelon Insights (R)	March 12–17, 2026	600 (LV)	± 4.1%	3%	14%	20%	4%	10%	13%	15%	1%	3%	2%	16%	
Evitarus (D)	March 12–17, 2026	2,000 (LV)	± 2.2%	3%	14%	16%	3%	10%	10%	10%	1%	3%	2%	5% (Note: "Prefer not to answer" with 3%; "Some other candidate" with 2%; "Will skip that office on the ballot" with <1%)	24%
Berkeley IGS	March 9–14, 2026	3,889 (LV)	± 2.5%	5%	16%	17%	4%	13%	10%	13%	1%	4%	1%	16%	
Emerson College	March 7–9, 2026	1,000 (LV)	± 3.0%	3%	11%	13%	3%	8%	11%	17%	1%	3%	2%	1%	25%
Politico/UC Berkeley/ TrueDot	February 25 – March 3, 2026	1,004 (LV)	± 3.3%	5%	11%	19%	3%	11%	13%	11%	1%	4%	2%	3% (Note: Ian Calderon (D) with 2%; "Would not vote" with 1%)	17%
Global Strategy Group (D)	February 27 – March 2, 2026	1,340 (LV)	± 3.5%	5%	15%	20%	3%	13%	16%	11%	—	2%	—	—	15%
Independent Voter Project	February 13–20, 2026	868 (LV)	± 3.6%	3%	23%	15%	2%	12%	8%	18%	1%	3%	2%	0% (Note: Ian Calderon (D) with 0%)	13%
Emerson College	February 13–14, 2026	1,000 (LV)	± 3.0%	4%	14%	17%	3%	10%	9%	14%	2%	3%	2%	2% (Note: Ian Calderon (D) and "Someone else" with 1%; John Slavett (R) with 0%)	21%
PPIC	February 3–11, 2026	1,049 (LV)	± 3.9%	5%	12%	14%	3%	13%	10%	11%	2%	5%	5%	11% (Note: "Someone else" with 3%; Butch Ware (G) with 2%; Ian Calderon (D), Brandon Jones (R), Jimmy Parker (R), Jon Slavet (R), Leo Zacky (R), and "No One" with 1%; Sharifah Hardie (R), Kyle Langford (R), and Daniel Mercuri (R) with 0%)	10%
Tavern Research (D)	February 2–5, 2026	1,097 (LV)	± 3.3%	6%	20%	12%	2%	9%	9%	10%	— (Note: "All other candidates (Yee, Calderon, Thurmond)" and "Other" with 2%)	3%	—	4%	25%
EMC Research (D) (Note: Poll sponsored by Swalwell's campaign)	January 29 – February 4, 2026	1,400 (V)	—	6%	21%	17%	5%	12%	9%	18%	1%	3%	2%	2% (Note: Butch Ware (G) with 2%; Ian Calderon (D) with 0%)	4%
Global Strategy Group (D)	January 29 – February 3, 2026	— (LV)	—	4%	18%	18%	3%	12%	10%	11%	—	3%	—	—	21%
J Wallin Opinion Research (Note: Poll sponsored by Slavet's campaign)	January 29 – February 1, 2026	1,000 (RV)	—	6%	11%	14%	4%	8%	12%	9%	3%	7%	4%	7% (Note: John Slavet (R) with 5%; Ian Calderon (D) with 2%)	15%
RBI Strategies & Research (D) (Note: Poll sponsored by the American Federation of State, County and Municipal Employees Local 101, which opposes Mahan)	January 25–29, 2026	— (LV)	—	4%	15%	16%	3%	13%	8%	14%	2%	3%	—	—	23%
Tulchin Research (D) (Note: Poll sponsored by Villaraigosa's campaign)	January 22–28, 2026	1,000 (LV)	± 3.1%	5%	15%	15%	—	13%	10%	14%	1%	7%	2%	2% (Note: Ché Ahn (R) and Jon Slavet (R) with 1%)	16%
Public Policy Polling (D) (Note: Poll sponsored by Porter's campaign)	January 20–21, 2026	1,001 (V)	—	6%	18%	17%	5%	14%	8%	12%	1%	2%	—	—	17%
David Binder Research (D) (Note: Poll sponsored by California Environmental Voters, who co-endorsed Porter and Steyer.)	January 17–20, 2026	800 (LV)	± 3.5%	5%	17%	14%	—	11%	8%	11%	2%	3%	1%	3% (Note: Leo Zacky (R) and "Someone else" with 1%; Ian Calderon (D) and Jon Slavet (R) with <1%)	25%
CivicLens Research	December 14–16, 2025	400 (LV)	± 4.5%	1%	14%	18%	—	9%	7%	12%	3%	2%	2%	3% (Note: "Someone else" with 3%)	31%
FM3 Research (D)	November 30 – December 7, 2025	632 (LV)	± 4.0%	3%	17%	18%	—	13%	6%	17%	1%	3%	1%	—	20%
Emerson College	December 1–2, 2025	1,000 (LV)	± 3.0%	4%	13%	12%	—	11%	4%	12%	2%	5%	2%	5% (Note: "Someone else" and "Not planning to vote" with 2%; Ian Calderon (D) with 1%)	31%
Lake Research Partners (D) (Note: Poll sponsored by Thurmond's campaign)	November 17–20, 2025	600 (LV)	± 4.0%	6%	10%	17%	—	15%	4%	10%	3%	7%	3%	1% (Note: Ian Calderon (D) with 1%)	22%
PPIC	November 13–19, 2025	1,086 (LV)	± 3.9%	14%	10%	14%	—	21%	—	—	2%	8%	7%	19% (Note: "Someone else" with 12%; Ian Calderon (D), Sharifah Hardie (R), Brandon Jones (R), Kyle Langford (R), Daniel Mercuri (R), Jimmy Parker (R), and Butch Ware (G) with 1%; Stephen Cloobeck (D) and Leo Zacky (R) with <1%)	5%
Tavern Research (D)	October 27–30, 2025	1,001 (LV)	± 4.0%	9%	16%	12%	—	15%	—	—	2%	5%	3%	9% (Note: Stephen Cloobeck (D) and Ian Calderon (D) with 1%, "Other" with 7%)	29%
EMC Research (D) (Note: Poll sponsored by an unnamed group supporting Swalwell's campaign)	October 22–26, 2025	1,000 (LV)	± 3.1%	9%	14%	20%	—	16%	3%	11%	3%	5%	3%	16% (Note: Butch Ware (G) at 2%; Ian Calderon (D) at 1%; "Someone else" with 13%)	
Emerson College	October 20–21, 2025	900 (LV)	± 3.19%	5%	11%	16%	—	15%	—	—	3%	5%	2%	4% (Note: Stephen Cloobeck (D) and Ian Calderon (D) with 1%; "Someone else" with 2%)	39%
Bold Decision	October 16–21, 2025	509 (LV)	± 4.3%	8%	14%	13%	—	12%	7%	—	1%	7%	4%	4% (Note: Ian Calderon (D) and Stephen Cloobeck (D) with 2%)	29%
Emerson College	April 12–14, 2025	899 (LV)	± 3.2%	3%	4%	—	—	12%	—	—	2%	5%	3%	17% (Note: Eleni Kounalakis (D) with 3%; Toni Atkins (D) and Kyle Langford (R) with 2%; Stephen Cloobeck (D), Brandon Jones (R), Daniel Mercuri (R), and Jimmy Parker (R) with 1%; Sharifah Hardie (R), Butch Ware (G), Michael Younger (D), and Leo Zacky (R) with <1%; "Someone else" with 5%)	54%

Hypothetical polling

with Rick Caruso

Poll source	Date(s) administered	Sample size	Margin of error	Xavier Becerra (D)	Chad Bianco (R)	Rick Caruso (D)	Steve Hilton (R)	Katie Porter (D)	Antonio Villaraigosa (D)	Betty Yee (D)	Other	Undecided
Berkeley IGS	October 20–27, 2025	8,141 (RV)	± 2.0%	8%	13%	3%	8%	11%	5%	3%	5%	44%
Emerson College	September 15–16, 2025	1,000 (RV)	± 3%	5%	8%	4%	10%	16%	4%	3%	10% (Note: Toni Atkins (D), Sharifah Hardie (R), Brandon Jones (R), Kyle Langford (R), Jimmy Parker (R), Tony Thurmond (D) and Butch Ware (G) with 1%; Stephen Cloobeck (D), Daniel Mercuri (R) and Leo Zacky (R) with <.5%; "Someone else" with 2%)	38%
Berkeley IGS	August 11–17, 2025	4,950 (RV)	± 1.5%	9%	10%	4%	6%	17%	4%	2%	9% (Note: Brian Dahle (R) and Richard Grenell (R) with 2%; Toni Atkins (D) and Tony Thurmond (D) with 1%; Stephen Cloobeck (D) with <1%; "Someone else" with 3%)	38%
True Dot/ Politico	July 28–August 12, 2025	875 (RV)	± 2.6%	9%	15%	6%	10%	21%	9%	6%	15% (Note: Eleni Kounalakis (D) with 7%; Toni Atkins (D) with 4%; Stephen Cloobeck (D) and Tony Thurmond (D) with 2%)	9%
Emerson College	August 4–5, 2025	1,000 (RV)	± 3%	3%	7%	4%	12%	18%	5%	2%	13% (Note: Eleni Kounalakis (D) with 3%; Toni Atkins (D) and Stephen Cloobeck (D) with 2%; Tony Thurmond (D) with 1%; "Someone else" with 5%)	38%

with Alex Padilla

Poll source	Date(s) administered	Sample size	Margin of error	Xavier Becerra (D)	Chad Bianco (R)	Rick Caruso (D)	Steve Hilton (R)	Alex Padilla (D)	Katie Porter (D)	Antonio Villaraigosa (D)	Betty Yee (D)	Other	Undecided
Emerson College	September 15–16, 2025	1,000 (RV)	± 3%	3%	8%	4%	10%	7%	16%	4%	2%	9% (Note: Tony Thurmond (D), Toni Atkins (D), Stephen Cloobeck (D), Sharifah Hardie (R), Daniel Mercuri (R), Kyle Langford (R) and Jimmy Parker (R) with 1%; Brandon Jones (R), Leo Zacky (R) and Butch Ware (G) with <.5%; "Someone else" with 2%)	36%

with Kamala Harris

Poll source	Date(s) administered	Sample size	Margin of error	Xavier Becerra (D)	Chad Bianco (R)	Kamala Harris (D)	Eleni Kounalakis (D)	Kyle Langford (R)	Katie Porter (D)	Antonio Villaraigosa (D)	Other	Undecided
Emerson College	April 12–14, 2025	911 (LV)	± 3.2%	2%	4%	31%	2%	2%	8%	2%	10% (Note: "Someone else" with 3%; Betty Yee (D), Stephen Cloobeck (D), Toni Atkins (D), Tony Thurmond (D), Sharifah Hardie (R), Brandon Jones (R), and Jimmy Parker (R) with 1%; Daniel Mercuri (R), Butch Ware (G), Michael Younger (D), and Leo Zacky (R) with <.5%)	39%

with John Cox, Lanhee Chen and Rob Bonta

Poll source	Date(s) administered	Sample size	Margin of error	Toni Atkins (D)	Xavier Becerra (D)	Rob Bonta (D)	Lanhee Chen (R)	John Cox (R)	Kamala Harris (D)	Eleni Kounalakis (D)	Katie Porter (D)	Tony Thurmond (D)	Antonio Villaraigosa (D)	Betty Yee (D)	Other
Capitol Weekly	February 3–7, 2025	692 (RV)	data-sort-value="" style="vertical-align:middle; text-align:center" class="table-na" | —	2%	4%	7%	10%	21%	23%	2%	16%	1%	2%	2%	10% (Note: Rick Caruso (D) with 8%; Laphonza Butler (D) with 2%; Stephen Cloobeck (D) with 0%)
Capitol Weekly	February 3–7, 2025	1073 (Note: Total says 1073, but numbers add up to 1071)	data-sort-value="" style="vertical-align:middle; text-align:center" class="table-na" | —	3%	5%	9%	9%	21%	—	5%	26%	2%	3%	3%	12% (Note: Rick Caruso (D) with 8%; Laphonza Butler (D) with 4%; Stephen Cloobeck (D) with 0%)

with Brian Dahle

Poll source	Date(s) administered	Sample size	Margin of error	Toni Atkins (D)	Xavier Becerra (D)	Chad Bianco (R)	Brian Dahle (R)	Steve Hilton (R)	Eleni Kounalakis (D)	Katie Porter (D)	Tony Thurmond (D)	Antonio Villaraigosa (D)	Betty Yee (D)	Other	Undecided
USC/CSU Long Beach/ Cal Poly Pomona	September 12–25, 2024	1,685 (LV)	± 2.4%	1%	3%	5%	5%	4%	2%	14%	1%	3%	3%	9% (Note: Rob Bonta (D) with 4%; Rick Caruso (D) with 3%; Lanhee Chen (R) with 2%)	50%
Tulchin Research (D)	August 8–12, 2024	800 (LV)	± 3.5%	—	—	—	13%	10%	10%	4%	4%	13%	7%	—	39%

with Steve Garvey

Poll source	Date(s) administered	Sample size	Margin of error	Toni Atkins (D)	Xavier Becerra (D)	Chad Bianco (R)	Steve Garvey (R)	Eleni Kounalakis (D)	Katie Porter (D)	Tony Thurmond (D)	Antonio Villaraigosa (D)	Betty Yee (D)	Other	Undecided
Breakthrough Campaigns (Note: Poll sponsored by Woman Up)	November 22–26, 2024	1,228 (LV)	± 2.8%	1%	2%	6%	18%	8%	21%	3%	3%	3%	23% (Note: Brian Dahle (R) with 9%; Rob Bonta (D) with 6%; Rick Caruso with 5%; Laphonza Butler (D) with 3%; Stephen Cloobeck (D) with 0%)	12%
Breakthrough Campaigns	November 22–26, 2024	1,228 (LV)	± 2.8%	3%	6%	14%	21%	9%	24%	2%	3%	6%	1% (Note: Stephen Cloobeck (D) with 1%)	11%

"Democratic Primary Poll" (Note: Survey asked only Democratic voters. In California, all candidates run on the same ballot in a "blanket primary.")

Poll source	Date(s) administered	Sample size	Margin of error	Toni Atkins (D)	Stephen Cloobeck (D)	Kamala Harris (D)	Eleni Kounalakis (D)	Katie Porter (D)	Tony Thurmond (D)	Antonio Villaraigosa (D)	Betty Yee (D)	Other	Undecided
Emerson College (Note: Poll sponsored by Inside California Politics and The Hill)	February 10–11, 2025	469 (RV)	± 4.5%	3%	1%	57%	4%	9%	1%	4%	2%	3% (Note: "Someone else" with 3%; Michael Younger (D) with 1%)	17%
Emerson College	February 10–11, 2025	469 (RV)	± 4.5%	3%	3%	—	5%	21%	3%	9%	3%	9% (Note: "Someone else" with 8%; Michael Younger (D) with 1%)	45%

=== Results ===
County results Becerra: 20–30%; 30–40%; Hilton: 20–30%; 30–40%; 40–50%; Steyer: 20–30%; 30–40%; Bianco: 40–50%

Congressional district results Becerra: 20–30%; 30–40%; Hilton: 20–30%; 30–40%; 40–50%; Steyer: 20–30%; 30–40%; 40–50%

Vote share of Becerra by county

Vote share of Hilton by county

Vote share of Steyer by county

Vote share of Bianco by county

Primary election results
Party	Candidate	Votes	%
Democratic	Xavier Becerra	2,591,857	27.98
Republican	Steve Hilton	2,277,318	24.59
Democratic	Tom Steyer	2,110,707	22.79
Republican	Chad Bianco	941,708	10.17
Democratic	Katie Porter	403,908	4.36
Democratic	Matt Mahan	327,537	3.54
Democratic	Antonio Villaraigosa	104,107	1.12
Democratic	Tony Thurmond	63,762	0.69
Peace and Freedom	Ramsey Robinson	51,803	0.56
Democratic	Betty Yee (withdrawn)	40,873	0.44
Democratic	Eric Swalwell (withdrawn)	28,164	0.30
Republican	Tim Nelson	23,712	0.26
Green	Butch Ware (write-in)	22,493	0.24
Republican	Randeep S. Dhillon	21,937	0.24
Democratic	Barack D. Obama Shaw	16,716	0.18
Democratic	Carolina Buhler	15,013	0.16
Republican	Leo Samuel Zacky	14,708	0.16
Republican	Gretha Solórzano	12,563	0.14
Democratic	Matthew Chase Levy	11,059	0.12
Libertarian	Tom Woodard (withdrawn)	9,328	0.10
Democratic	Erin "Zez" Zezulak	9,251	0.10
Democratic	Louis A. De Barraicua	8,851	0.10
Democratic	Mohammad Arif	8,458	0.09
Republican	Leo Naranjo IV	8,099	0.09
No party preference	Nancy D. Young	7,012	0.08
Republican	James Athans Jr.	6,633	0.07
No party preference	Joseph Cabrera	6,196	0.07
Republican	David Zickefoose	5,882	0.06
Democratic	Satish Rao	5,668	0.06
No party preference	Christine R. Sarmiento	5,643	0.06
No party preference	Jon Henderson	5,589	0.06
Republican	Alicia Olivia Lapp	5,370	0.06
No party preference	Amanda Martin	5,234	0.06
No party preference	Frederic C. Schultz	5,230	0.06
Republican	Rafael M. Hernandez	5,223	0.06
Democratic	Scott P. Shields	5,043	0.05
Democratic	Derek Grasty	4,994	0.05
Democratic	Larry Azevedo	4,675	0.05
No party preference	Elaine Culotti	4,483	0.05
Republican	Patricia De Luca Basualdo	4,064	0.04
No party preference	Mauro Alberto Orozco	4,052	0.04
Democratic	Raji Rab	3,606	0.04
Democratic	Sophia Edum-a-Sam	3,550	0.04
No party preference	Brent Maupin	3,132	0.03
Democratic	Akinyemi Agbede	3,037	0.03
No party preference	Lewis Herms	2,995	0.03
No party preference	Naomi Bar-Lev	2,744	0.03
No party preference	Daniel Mercuri	2,667	0.03
Republican	Ché Ahn (write-in)	2,419	0.03
Democratic	Gary Howard Kidgell	2,415	0.03
Democratic	Joel E. Jacob	2,350	0.03
Democratic	Thunder Parley	2,320	0.03
No party preference	Margaret Trowe	2,286	0.02
No party preference	LivingForGod AndCountry DeMott	2,206	0.02
No party preference	Reza Safarnejad	1,990	0.02
American Solidarity	Duane Terrence Loynes Jr. (Note: Officially no party preference, but nominated by the American Solidarity Party, a political body attempting to qualify as a political party)	1,905	0.02
No party preference	Don J. Grundmann	1,903	0.02
No party preference	Anne Komarovsk	1,535	0.02
No party preference	Dawit Kellel	1,360	0.01
No party preference	Sam Sandak	1,222	0.01
No party preference	Max Fomin	842	0.01
No party preference	Lukasz Adam Filinski	527	0.01
No party preference	Serge Fiankan	488	0.01
No party preference	Sean Forbes (write-in)	22	0.00
Democratic	Jibri J. Peavy (write-in)	10	0.00
No party preference	Dirk Langer (write-in)	8	0.00
Democratic	Kalid Meky (write-in)	5	0.00
No party preference	Michael J. Dilger (write-in)	1	0.00
Total votes		9,262,468	100.00
Turnout		9,446,461	40.80
Registered electors		23,155,447	

==== By county ====
County	Xavier Becerra Democratic		Steve Hilton Republican		Tom Steyer Democratic		Chad Bianco Republican		Various candidates Various parties		Margin		Total votes
County	#	%	#	%	#	%	#	%	#	%	#	%	Total votes
Alameda	114,210	32.10%	35,420	9.95%	120,890	33.98%	10,230	2.88%	75,050	21.09%	6,680	1.88%	355,800
Alpine	145	29.53%	130	26.48%	110	22.40%	35	7.13%	71	14.46%	15	3.05%	491
Amador	3,120	18.21%	7,210	42.09%	2,450	14.30%	2,110	12.32%	2,240	13.08%	4,090	23.88%	17,130
Butte	15,200	21.32%	24,110	33.82%	13,420	18.82%	8,450	11.85%	10,110	14.19%	8,910	12.50%	71,290
Calaveras	3,410	16.79%	8,920	43.92%	2,540	12.51%	2,810	13.84%	2,630	12.94%	5,510	27.13%	20,310
Colusa	980	19.14%	2,150	41.99%	620	12.11%	740	14.45%	630	12.31%	1,170	22.85%	5,120
Contra Costa	94,110	31.23%	61,420	20.38%	82,350	27.33%	18,220	6.05%	45,210	15.01%	11,760	3.90%	301,310
Del Norte	1,420	20.11%	2,890	40.93%	1,110	15.72%	840	11.90%	800	11.34%	1,470	20.82%	7,060
El Dorado	15,420	19.80%	31,450	40.38%	12,110	15.55%	9,820	12.61%	9,080	11.66%	16,030	20.58%	77,880
Fresno	10,132	16.51%	19,149	31.20%	11,748	19.14%	11,574	18.86%	8,774	14.29%	7,401	12.06%	61,377
Glenn	1,110	15.59%	3,210	45.08%	740	10.39%	1,220	17.13%	840	11.81%	1,990	27.95%	7,120
Humboldt	14,210	29.11%	10,230	20.96%	15,310	31.37%	2,410	4.94%	6,650	13.62%	1,100	2.25%	48,810
Imperial	11,200	41.19%	5,420	19.93%	4,110	15.12%	2,890	10.63%	3,570	13.13%	5,780	21.26%	27,190
Inyo	1,210	21.08%	2,150	37.46%	940	16.38%	710	12.37%	730	12.71%	940	16.38%	5,740
Kern	32,450	22.42%	51,220	35.39%	18,910	13.07%	26,450	18.28%	15,690	10.84%	24,770	17.12%	144,720
Kings	4,810	22.10%	8,420	38.69%	2,610	11.99%	3,920	18.01%	2,000	9.21%	4,500	20.68%	21,760
Lake	5,120	27.22%	6,110	32.48%	4,210	22.38%	1,320	7.02%	2,050	10.90%	990	5.26%	18,810
Lassen	840	11.32%	3,890	52.43%	620	8.36%	1,210	16.31%	860	11.58%	2,680	36.12%	7,420
Los Angeles	685,420	31.19%	452,110	20.57%	504,890	22.98%	164,800	7.50%	390,200	17.76%	180,530	8.22%	2,197,420
Madera	7,210	21.63%	12,450	37.34%	4,210	12.63%	5,890	17.67%	3,580	10.73%	6,560	19.68%	33,340
Marin	28,420	31.15%	11,210	12.29%	41,250	45.21%	2,110	2.31%	8,250	9.04%	12,830	14.06%	91,240
Mariposa	1,410	19.29%	3,110	42.54%	1,120	15.32%	1,020	13.95%	650	8.90%	1,700	23.26%	7,310
Mendocino	8,420	29.52%	6,120	21.46%	9,890	34.68%	1,120	3.93%	2,970	10.41%	1,470	5.15%	28,520
Merced	15,210	31.39%	14,220	29.34%	7,210	14.88%	6,420	13.25%	5,400	11.14%	990	2.04%	48,460
Modoc	240	9.80%	1,320	53.88%	185	7.55%	410	16.73%	295	12.04%	910	37.14%	2,450
Mono	940	26.48%	1,120	31.55%	840	23.66%	250	7.04%	400	11.27%	180	5.07%	3,550
Monterey	31,450	35.53%	18,210	20.57%	22,410	25.32%	5,420	6.12%	11,030	12.46%	9,040	10.21%	88,520
Napa	12,410	29.31%	10,230	24.16%	13,110	30.96%	2,150	5.08%	4,440	10.49%	700	1.65%	42,340
Nevada	11,200	24.70%	15,210	33.55%	12,420	27.39%	2,890	6.37%	6,620	14.60%	2,790	6.15%	45,340
Orange	145,340	21.51%	216,220	31.99%	121,680	18.00%	86,500	12.80%	106,090	15.70%	70,880	10.49%	675,830
Placer	31,420	20.20%	64,210	41.28%	26,110	16.79%	18,230	11.72%	15,570	10.01%	32,790	21.08%	155,540
Plumas	1,620	18.49%	3,820	43.61%	1,310	14.95%	1,110	12.67%	910	10.39%	2,200	25.11%	8,760
Riverside	109,487	26.13%	86,354	20.61%	68,266	16.29%	112,400	26.83%	42,503	10.14%	2,913	0.70%	419,010
Sacramento	112,450	33.10%	85,340	25.12%	71,420	21.02%	31,260	9.20%	39,310	11.57%	27,110	7.98%	339,780
San Benito	4,890	32.80%	3,820	25.62%	3,210	21.53%	1,420	9.52%	1,570	10.53%	1,070	7.18%	14,910
San Bernardino	84,210	24.46%	108,420	31.50%	52,110	15.14%	63,420	18.42%	36,050	10.47%	45,000	13.07%	344,210
San Diego	185,210	24.12%	210,430	27.41%	162,100	21.11%	68,320	8.90%	141,680	18.45%	25,220	3.29%	767,740
San Francisco	68,110	29.51%	14,310	6.20%	105,220	45.58%	4,286	1.86%	38,904	16.85%	37,110	16.08%	230,830
San Joaquin	45,210	30.12%	43,890	29.24%	24,110	16.06%	19,230	12.81%	17,680	11.78%	1,320	0.88%	150,120
San Luis Obispo	24,120	26.29%	28,450	31.02%	22,110	24.10%	7,230	7.88%	9,820	10.71%	4,330	4.73%	91,730
San Mateo	68,420	33.09%	31,450	15.21%	78,920	38.17%	6,210	3.00%	21,750	10.52%	10,500	5.08%	206,750
Santa Barbara	34,210	30.25%	31,210	27.59%	28,420	25.13%	8,420	7.44%	10,850	9.59%	3,000	2.66%	113,110
Santa Clara	142,110	32.82%	68,420	15.80%	158,210	36.54%	15,340	3.54%	48,940	11.30%	16,100	3.72%	433,020
Santa Cruz	24,210	31.22%	9,110	11.75%	34,120	44.00%	1,840	2.37%	8,260	10.65%	9,910	12.78%	77,540
Shasta	9,210	14.78%	28,450	45.66%	6,110	9.81%	11,230	18.02%	7,310	11.73%	17,220	27.64%	62,310
Sierra	210	15.56%	620	45.93%	195	14.44%	180	13.33%	145	10.74%	410	30.37%	1,350
Siskiyou	3,110	19.32%	6,940	43.11%	2,150	13.35%	2,420	15.03%	1,480	9.19%	4,520	28.08%	16,100
Solano	32,410	32.50%	24,150	24.22%	23,120	23.18%	8,420	8.44%	11,630	11.66%	8,260	8.28%	99,730
Sonoma	48,210	30.09%	28,410	17.73%	62,110	38.76%	6,120	3.82%	15,380	9.60%	13,900	8.67%	160,230
Stanislaus	31,450	28.48%	36,420	32.99%	17,210	15.59%	14,350	13.00%	10,980	9.94%	4,970	4.51%	110,410
Sutter	5,120	19.23%	11,210	42.11%	3,110	11.68%	4,210	15.82%	2,970	11.16%	7,000	26.29%	26,620
Tehama	3,120	15.41%	9,210	45.48%	2,110	10.42%	3,640	17.98%	2,170	10.72%	5,570	27.50%	20,250
Trinity	910	21.02%	1,740	40.18%	740	17.09%	510	11.78%	430	9.93%	830	19.16%	4,330
Tulare	18,210	22.10%	27,450	33.31%	10,210	12.49%	19,230	23.33%	7,310	8.87%	8,220	10.02%	82,410
Tuolumne	3,920	19.32%	8,910	43.91%	2,890	14.24%	2,610	12.86%	1,960	9.66%	6,020	29.67%	20,290
Ventura	62,450	28.47%	61,210	27.91%	48,230	21.99%	24,110	10.99%	23,320	10.63%	1,240	0.56%	219,320
Yolo	18,210	33.10%	10,240	18.61%	19,450	35.36%	2,150	3.91%	4,960	9.02%	1,240	2.26%	55,010
Yuba	3,110	18.07%	7,422	43.13%	2,110	12.26%	2,740	15.92%	1,828	10.62%	4,312	25.06%	17,210
Totals	2,591,857	27.97%	2,277,318	24.59%	2,110,707	22.79%	941,708	10.17%	1,340,878	14.48%	314,539	3.38%	9,262,468

== General election ==
=== Predictions ===
Source	Ranking	As of
The Cook Political Report	Solid D	October 29, 2026
Decision Desk HQ	Safe D	November 3, 2026
Fox News	Solid D	November 1, 2026
Inside Elections	Solid D	October 29, 2026
NBC News	Solid D	November 3, 2026
RealClearPolitics	Solid D	November 1, 2026
Sabato's Crystal Ball	Safe D	November 2, 2026
Silver Bulletin	Solid D	November 3, 2026

=== Debate ===
2026 California gubernatorial debate
No.	Date	Host	Moderators	Link	Participants	
P Participant A Absent N Non-invitee I Invitee W Withdrawn						
P Participant A Absent N Non-invitee I Invitee W Withdrawn					Xavier Becerra	Steve Hilton
1	September 30, 2026	CNN	Jake Tapper; Dana Bash	YouTube	P	P

=== Post-primary endorsements ===
Xavier Becerra (D)

Executive branch officials

- Kamala Harris, former vice president of the United States (2021–2025)

U.S. senators

- Adam Schiff, California (2024–present)

U.S. representatives

- Katie Porter, former CA-47 (2019–2025) and former gubernatorial candidate

Statewide officials

- Gavin Newsom, governor of California (2019–present)

Individuals

- Rick Caruso, founder of Caruso and runner-up for mayor of Los Angeles in 2022
- Ron Conway, co-founder of SV Angel
- Evan Spiegel, CEO of Snap Inc.
- Tom Steyer, businessman, environmental activist, and former gubernatorial candidate
- Garry Tan, CEO of Y Combinator

Newspapers

- Santa Barbara Independent

Organizations

- California Chamber of Commerce
- California YIMBY
- Human Rights Campaign
- Reproductive Freedom for All

Political parties

- California Democratic Party
Steve Hilton (R)

U.S. representatives

- John Duarte, former CA-13 (2023–2025)

State legislators

- Jeff Gonzalez, AD-36 (2024–present)
- David Tangipa, AD-08 (2024–present)

Local officials

- Andrew Gruel, Huntington Beach city councilor from the at-large district (2025–present)

News organizations

- Pirate Wires

Party branches

- Placer County Republican Party
- Riverside County Republican Party
- San Mateo County Republican Party

=== Polling ===
Aggregate polls

Source of poll aggregation	Dates administered	Dates updated	Xavier Becerra (D)	Steve Hilton (R)	Other/Undecided (Note: Calculated by taking the difference of 100% and all other candidates combined.)	Margin
270toWin	September 15 – October 16, 2026	October 20, 2026	56.2%	36.0%	7.8%	Becerra +20.2%
Silver Bulletin	through October 19, 2026	October 22, 2026	58.4%	36.0%	5.6%	Becerra +22.4%
Average			57.3%	36.0%	6.7%	Becerra +21.3%

Poll source	Date(s) administered	Sample size	Margin of error	Xavier Becerra (D)	Steve Hilton (R)	Other	Undecided
ActiVote	October 17–31, 2026	400 (LV)	± 4.9%	63%	37%	–	–
Berkeley IGS	October 19–25, 2026	1,477 (LV)	± 3.0%	61%	34%	–	5%
SurveyUSA	October 19–24, 2026	799 (LV)	± 5.3%	54%	32%	–	14%
M3 Strategies (R)	October 21–23, 2026	489 (LV)	± 4.4%	59%	36%	–	4%
PPIC	October 16–22, 2026	1,086 (LV)	± 3.8%	61%	37%	1% (Note: "Neither/would not vote for governor" with 1%)	1%
McLaughlin & Associates (R) (Note: Poll conducted for the California Post)	October 17–20, 2026	800 (LV)	–	55%	39%	–	5%
Emerson College	October 17–19, 2026	1,000 (LV)	± 3.1%	60%	33%	—	7%
Emerson College	October 17–19, 2026	1,000 (LV)	± 3.1%	64% (Note: With undecided voters allocated)	36%	—	—
ActiVote	September 24 – October 16, 2026	400 (LV)	± 4.9%	63%	37%	–	–
UC Berkeley Citrin Center/TrueDot/Politico	October 9–14, 2026	909 (LV)	—	55%	35%	1% (Note: "Would not vote" with 1%)	10%
Manhattan Institute (R)	September 24 – October 1, 2026	1,000 (LV)	± 3.1%	57%	39%	1% (Note: "Neither" with 1%)	3%
Independent Voter Project	September 23–28, 2026	2,906 (LV)	± 2.5%	48%	38%	3% (Note: "Would skip the race" with 3%)	11%
Berkeley IGS	September 15–20, 2026	4,512 (LV)	± 2.0%	58%	33%	–	9%
SurveyUSA	September 15–20, 2026	742 (LV)	± 4.6%	55%	33%	–	12%
UC Berkeley Citrin Center/TrueDot/Politico	September 8–14, 2026	2,418 (RV)	± 2.7%	48%	34%	4% (Note: "Would not vote" with 4%)	13%
UC Berkeley Citrin Center/TrueDot/Politico	September 8–14, 2026	1,983 (LV)	± 3.0%	54%	36%	2% (Note: "Would not vote" with 2%)	8%
PPIC	September 4–10, 2026	1,103 (LV)	± 3.8%	60%	38%	1%	1%
Berkeley IGS	August 3–9, 2026	2,310 (LV)	± 2.5%	55%	37%	–	8%
PPIC	June 29 – July 6, 2026	1,003 (LV)	± 3.8%	61%	36%	–	2%
Kreate Strategies	June 13–17, 2026	900 (LV)	± 3.3%	58%	33%	–	8%
CEPP	May 23–26, 2026	735 (LV)	± 3.6%	58%	35%	2% (Note: "I will not vote in this election for Governor" with 2%)	5%
Berkeley IGS	May 19–24, 2026	8,578 (RV)	± 2.0%	52%	31%	–	17%

Hypothetical polling

Xavier Becerra vs. Tom Steyer

Poll source	Date(s) administered	Sample size	Margin of error	Xavier Becerra (D)	Tom Steyer (D)	Other	Undecided
CEPP	May 23–26, 2026	735 (LV)	± 3.6%	37%	26%	19% (Note: "I will not vote in this election for Governor" with 19%)	18%

Tom Steyer vs. Steve Hilton

Poll source	Date(s) administered	Sample size	Margin of error	Tom Steyer (D)	Steve Hilton (R)	Other	Undecided
CEPP	May 23–26, 2026	735 (LV)	± 3.6%	55%	34%	4% (Note: "I will not vote in this election for Governor" with 4%)	7%

Xavier Becerra vs. Katie Porter

Poll source	Date(s) administered	Sample size	Margin of error	Xavier Becerra (D)	Katie Porter (D)	Other	Undecided
CEPP	May 23–26, 2026	735 (LV)	± 3.6%	42%	22%	20% (Note: "I will not vote in this election for Governor" with 20%)	16%

Steve Hilton vs. Chad Bianco

Poll source	Date(s) administered	Sample size	Margin of error	Steve Hilton (R)	Chad Bianco (R)	Other	Undecided
CEPP	May 23–26, 2026	735 (LV)	± 3.6%	34%	15%	25% (Note: "I will not vote in this election for Governor" with 25%)	26%

Tom Steyer vs. Katie Porter

Poll source	Date(s) administered	Sample size	Margin of error	Tom Steyer (D)	Katie Porter (D)	Other	Undecided
CEPP	May 23–26, 2026	735 (LV)	± 3.6%	31%	30%	19%	20%

=== Results ===
2026 California gubernatorial election
Party	Candidate	Votes	%	±%
Democratic	Xavier Becerra	8,714,908	65.6	
Republican	Steve Hilton	4,560,879	34.4	
Total votes		13,275,787	100.00	
Democratic hold				

Counties that flipped from Republican to Democratic

- Butte (largest municipality: Chico)
- Fresno (largest municipality: Fresno)
- Inyo (largest municipality: Bishop)
- Kern (largest municipality: Bakersfield)
- Lake (largest municipality: Clearlake)
- Merced (largest municipality: Merced)
- Orange (largest municipality: Anaheim)
- Riverside (largest municipality: Riverside)
- San Bernardino (largest municipality: San Bernardino)
- San Joaquin (largest municipality: Stockton)
- Stanislaus (largest municipality: Modesto)
- Tulare (largest municipality: Visalia)

== See also ==
- 2026 California elections
- 2026 United States gubernatorial elections
- 2026 Los Angeles mayoral election

== Notes ==
Partisan and media clients
