= Chad Bianco =

American sheriff (born 1967)

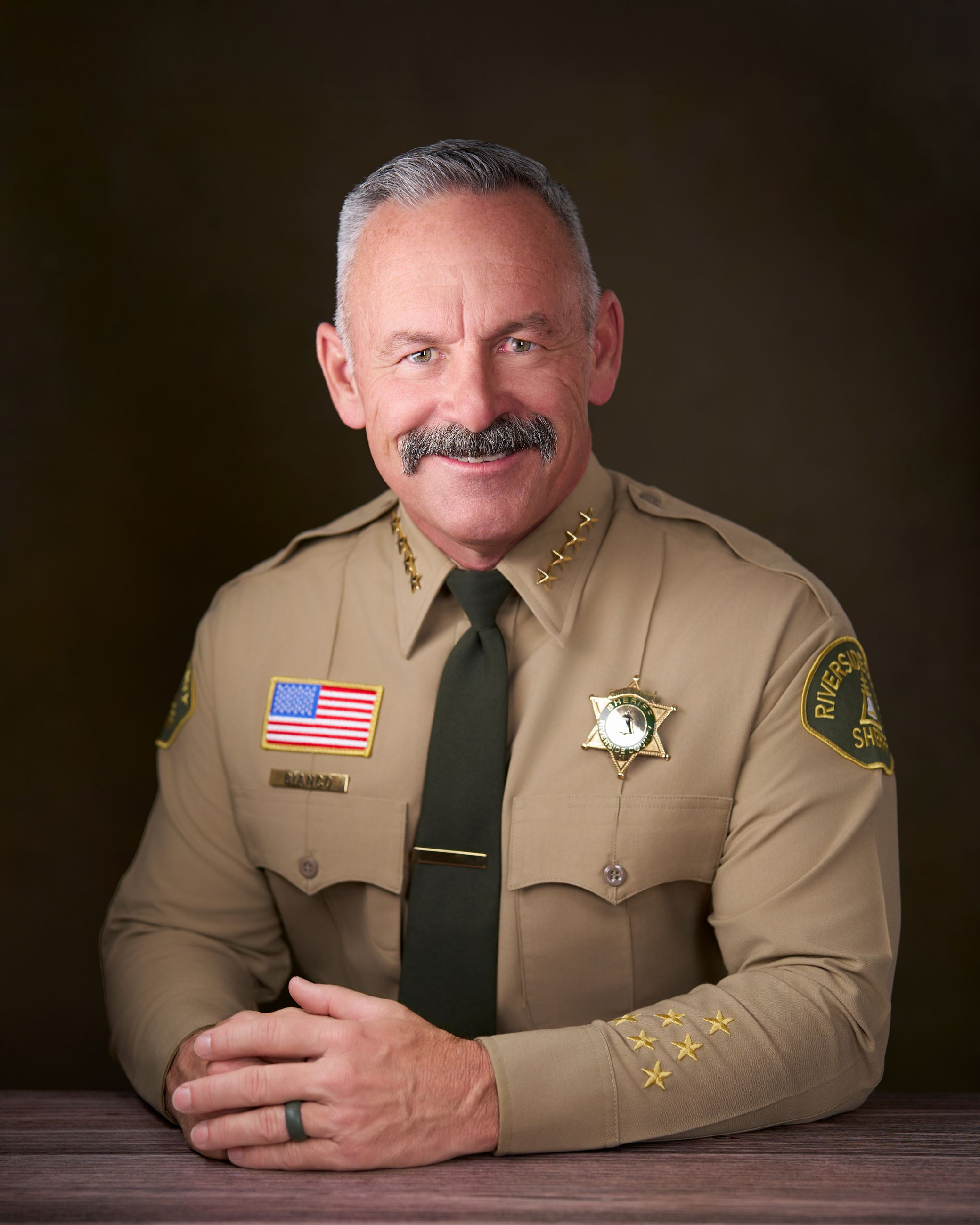
- Official portrait, 2025

14th Sheriff of Riverside County
- Incumbent
- Assumed office January 7, 2019
- Preceded by: Stanley Sniff

Personal details
- Born: Johnny Chad Bianco; October 9, 1967 (age 59) Hill Air Force Base, Utah, U.S.
- Party: Republican
- Spouse: Denise Bianco
- Children: 4
- Education: College of Eastern Utah; University of Utah; Columbia Southern University (BS)
- Website: Office website Campaign website
- Police career
- Department: Riverside Sheriff
- Service years: 1993–present
- Rank: Sheriff

Johnny Chad Bianco (born October 9, 1967) is an American law enforcement officer who has served as the sheriff of Riverside County, California, since 2019. A member of the Republican Party, Bianco has been affiliated with the Constitutional Sheriffs and Peace Officers Association. He was a candidate for governor of California in the 2026 election.

== Early life and education ==
Johnny Chad Bianco was born on October 9, 1967, at Hill Air Force Base in Utah. He has two younger brothers.

Bianco moved from Utah to California in 1989, and in 1993 attended the San Bernardino Sheriff's Academy. He graduated at the top of his class, and joined the Riverside County Sheriff's Department shortly after graduation.

== Career ==
Before the 2014 election, Bianco worked as a Lieutenant at the Hemet police station. In 2014, Bianco first ran for sheriff, but was unsuccessful.

=== Sheriff of Riverside County ===
In 2018, Bianco ran again, and was successfully elected Riverside County sheriff. He was re-elected in 2022 with about 60% of votes for a term set to last until 2028 due to a state law changing sheriff election years to match presidential ones. Bianco has been hosted on Fox News, as well as by conservative pastors on YouTube channels and podcasts. As of 2023, Bianco's department had over 3,600 employees and was managing five jails.

In 2020, during the COVID-19 pandemic, Bianco stated that he would not enforce Coronavirus mandates and did not plan to get vaccinated. He tested positively for the virus in January 2021 with mild symptoms, after which he started quarantining at his home.

His department has the lowest closure rate for Part 1 property crimes in California, performing at less than 25% of the overall average. Democratic activist Stephen J. Cloobeck sued him for use of the uniform and badge during campaign events and media interviews, alleging a violation of California Government Code 3206. That law, addressing political activities of public employees, states: "No officer or employee of a local agency shall participate in political activities of any kind while in uniform.

In 2022, Riverside County jails registered 18 inmate deaths, the biggest number in 15 years. The spike prompted multiple civil lawsuits against the county's prison facilities and Bianco himself. In 2023, Bianco's department was placed under investigation by the California Department of Justice to determine if the organization had "engaged in a pattern or practice of unconstitutional policing amid deeply concerning allegations relating to conditions of confinement in its jail facilities, excessive force, and other misconduct." In relation to those incidents, Bianco claimed that "every single one of these inmate deaths was out of anyone's control".

Bianco was awarded the 2023 Sheriff Award by the conservative think tank the Claremont Institute.

In 2025, Bianco's handling of the arrest of Las Vegas resident Vem Miller near a Donald Trump rally led to a $100 million federal lawsuit against him and Riverside County, with Miller alleging defamation and civil rights violations after Bianco claimed the arrest thwarted a potential assassination attempt. The lawsuit was later dismissed; Miller was ordered in January 2026 to complete a gun-safety course and 40 hours of community service by a county judge.

In September 2025, a college student at California State University, San Marcos was arrested by university police after allegedly making online death threats against Bianco. She posted bail one day after her arrest. Bianco described the threat as "sickening", and called on elected politicians to condemn political violence and "cool the temperature".

On July 14, 2026, Bianco announced his intention to seek a third term as Sheriff of Riverside County which would expire in 2034, should Bianco be re-elected

In October 2026, a bill was passed in both houses of the state legislature and signed by the Governor of California to separate the office of Sheriff from the office of coroner, following complaints about transparency around unnatural deaths that occurred in Riverside County jails during Bianco's tenure.

=== 2026 gubernatorial campaign ===
Bianco announced his run for Governor of California in the 2026 California gubernatorial election on February 17, 2025, becoming the first major Republican to enter the race.

On February 21, Bianco attended a press conference in San Diego with Republican leaders to promote State Senate Republican Minority Leader Brian Jones' proposed bill SB554 to weaken the California Senate Bill 54 of 2017 that limits law enforcement's ability to cooperate with ICE.

In April 2026, Bianco ordered the seizure of ballots from California's 2025 election, citing concerns about election integrity, a focus of his political campaign. A Riverside County judge and the California Supreme Court subsequently ordered the search warrants authorizing the seizure to be unsealed. The affidavits revealed that their case rested solely on claims from a citizens' activist group; the group was overseen by Shasta County's Registrar of Voters. The seizure of the ballots was found to be unlawful by the California Supreme Court.

In May 2026, Bianco was polling in the low teens in the election for California governor. He ultimately failed to advance to the November runoff with 10.2% of the vote.

== Political positions ==
Bianco has portrayed himself as a law and order candidate, and supported Proposition 36. Bianco has proposed reducing homelessness in California by expanding alcohol and drug treatment centers.

In 2018, Bianco walked in a Palm Springs Pride Parade. In June 2020, Bianco oversaw police presence at a Black Lives Matter protest in Riverside. Here, Bianco showed support for and knelt with protestors, during the George Floyd protests; at the protest, he was hit with a thrown screwdriver. He later became critical of the movement, describing the protests as destructive riots in 2023.

During the 2024 presidential election, Bianco endorsed Donald Trump, stating in a sarcastic video that "It's time we put a felon in the White House", referring to Trump's felony conviction in May 2024.

== Personal life ==
Bianco and his wife Denise live in Woodcrest, California; they attend Sandals Church in Riverside. He is married and has four adult children.

Following a hacking incident in September 2021 against a database belonging to the Oath Keepers, Bianco, along with over 200 law-enforcement officers, was exposed as a former member of the organization. He later stated that he had paid for a $40 one-year membership in the organization in 2014 and did not renew it for the next year. Bianco has since disavowed the group's violent conduct, although he maintained that he is "proud" to be an Oath Keeper during a 2026 gubernatorial debate.

== Electoral history ==
=== 2014 ===
2014 Riverside County Sheriff-Coroner-Public Admin. election
Primary election
Party	Candidate	Votes	%
Nonpartisan	Stan Sniff	108,568	62.27%
Nonpartisan	Chad Bianco	65,771	37.73%
Total votes		174,339	100.0

=== 2018 ===
2018 Riverside County Sheriff-Coroner-Public Admin. election
Primary election
Party	Candidate	Votes	%
Nonpartisan	Chad Bianco	109,997	36.29%
Nonpartisan	Stan Sniff	95,764	31.59%
Nonpartisan	Dave Brown	59,200	19.53%
Nonpartisan	Miguel Garcia IV	38,161	12.59%
Total votes		303,122	100.0
General election
Nonpartisan	Chad Bianco	323,671	58.29%
Nonpartisan	Stan Sniff	231,650	41.71%
Total votes		555,321	100.0

=== 2022 ===
2022 Riverside County Sheriff-Coroner-Public Admin. election
Primary election
Party	Candidate	Votes	%
Nonpartisan	Chad Bianco	210,335	60.71%
Nonpartisan	Michael J. Lujan	136,100	39.29%
Total votes		346,435	100.0

=== 2026 ===
2026 California gubernatorial election
Party	Candidate	Votes	%
Democratic	Xavier Becerra	2,591,857	27.98
Republican	Steve Hilton	2,277,318	24.59
Democratic	Tom Steyer	2,110,707	22.79
Republican	Chad Bianco	941,708	10.17
Democratic	Katie Porter	403,908	4.36
Democratic	Matt Mahan	327,537	3.54
Democratic	Antonio Villaraigosa	104,107	1.12
Democratic	Tony Thurmond	63,762	0.69
Peace and Freedom	Ramsey Robinson	51,803	0.56
Democratic	Betty Yee (withdrawn)	40,873	0.44
Democratic	Eric Swalwell (withdrawn)	28,164	0.30
Republican	Tim Nelson	23,712	0.26
Green	Butch Ware (write-in)	22,493	0.24
Republican	Randeep S. Dhillon	21,937	0.24
Democratic	Barack D. Obama Shaw	16,716	0.18
Democratic	Carolina Buhler	15,013	0.16
Republican	Leo Samuel Zacky	14,708	0.16
Republican	Gretha Solórzano	12,563	0.14
Democratic	Matthew Chase Levy	11,059	0.12
Libertarian	Tom Woodard (withdrawn)	9,328	0.10
Democratic	Erin "Zez" Zezulak	9,251	0.10
Democratic	Louis A. De Barraicua	8,851	0.10
Democratic	Mohammad Arif	8,458	0.09
Republican	Leo Naranjo IV	8,099	0.09
No party preference	Nancy D. Young	7,012	0.08
Republican	James Athans Jr.	6,633	0.07
No party preference	Joseph Cabrera	6,196	0.07
Republican	David Zickefoose	5,882	0.06
Democratic	Satish Rao	5,668	0.06
No party preference	Christine R. Sarmiento	5,643	0.06
No party preference	Jon Henderson	5,589	0.06
Republican	Alicia Olivia Lapp	5,370	0.06
No party preference	Amanda Martin	5,234	0.06
No party preference	Frederic C. Schultz	5,230	0.06
Republican	Rafael M. Hernandez	5,223	0.06
Democratic	Scott P. Shields	5,043	0.05
Democratic	Derek Grasty	4,994	0.05
Democratic	Larry Azevedo	4,675	0.05
No party preference	Elaine Culotti	4,483	0.05
Republican	Patricia De Luca Basualdo	4,064	0.04
No party preference	Mauro Alberto Orozco	4,052	0.04
Democratic	Raji Rab	3,606	0.04
Democratic	Sophia Edum-a-Sam	3,550	0.04
No party preference	Brent Maupin	3,132	0.03
Democratic	Akinyemi Agbede	3,037	0.03
No party preference	Lewis Herms	2,995	0.03
No party preference	Naomi Bar-Lev	2,744	0.03
No party preference	Daniel Mercuri	2,667	0.03
Republican	Ché Ahn (write-in)	2,419	0.03
Democratic	Gary Howard Kidgell	2,415	0.03
Democratic	Joel E. Jacob	2,350	0.03
Democratic	Thunder Parley	2,320	0.03
No party preference	Margaret Trowe	2,286	0.02
No party preference	LivingForGod AndCountry DeMott	2,206	0.02
No party preference	Reza Safarnejad	1,990	0.02
No party preference	Duane Terrence Loynes Jr.	1,905	0.02
No party preference	Don J. Grundmann	1,903	0.02
No party preference	Anne Komarovsk	1,535	0.02
No party preference	Dawit Kellel	1,360	0.01
No party preference	Sam Sandak	1,222	0.01
No party preference	Max Fomin	842	0.01
No party preference	Lukasz Adam Filinski	527	0.01
No party preference	Serge Fiankan	488	0.01
No party preference	Sean Forbes (write-in)	22	0.00
Democratic	Jibri J. Peavy (write-in)	10	0.00
No party preference	Dirk Langer (write-in)	8	0.00
Democratic	Kalid Meky (write-in)	5	0.00
No party preference	Michael J. Dilger (write-in)	1	0.00
Total votes		9,262,468	100.00
