= Union of American Physicians and Dentists =

American healthcare labor union

Union of American Physicians and Dentists is the first national union of physicians and dentists in the United States. UAPD is part of AFSCME and AFL-CIO.

== History ==
Dr. Sanford Marcus founded the union in 1972 in the San Francisco Bay Area. As of 1989, 40,000 of roughly 50,000 organized doctors in the US were members, with 70% as self employed physicians. The union's initial purpose was to improve medical care for patients rather than win economic gains for doctors.

The union was active in the 1975 malpractice insurance crisis. Bargaining over salaries was not permitted until California law changed in 1981.

Dr. Robert Weinmann succeeded Dr. Marcus as president in 1990.

In 2025, UAPD participated in a 5 day strike at PeaceHealth.
