= Stephen Cloobeck =

American businessman (born 1961)

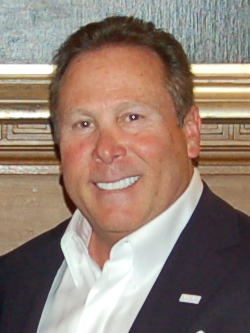
- Cloobeck in 2012
- Born: October 26, 1961 (age 65)
- Education: Brandeis University (BS)
- Political party: Democratic (before 2026); Republican (2026–present)
- Spouse: Chantal Leduc (m. 1997; div. 2018)
- Children: 3

Stephen J. Cloobeck (born October 26, 1961) is an American businessman and the founder, former chairman, and chief executive officer of the timeshare company Diamond Resorts. In 2025, he briefly ran a campaign for governor of California ahead of the 2026 election, but ended his campaign more than six months before the primaries.

== Early life ==
In 1983, Cloobeck graduated from Brandeis University with a degree in Psychobiology.

== Business activity ==
In April 2007, Cloobeck acquired the publicly traded vacation ownership company Sunterra Corporation and converted it into Diamond Resorts International. He is also the chairman of the board of the US Corporation for Travel Promotion. Cloobeck stepped down as chairman and chief executive officer of Diamond Resorts International when the company was purchased by Apollo Global Management, LLC in June 2016.

== Charitable activity ==
Cloobeck supports charities and civic organizations including the Prostate Cancer Foundation, FasterCures, the Barack Obama Foundation, the Brent Shapiro Foundation for Drug Prevention, the Los Angeles Dodgers Foundation, the Los Angeles Dream Center, and various educational initiatives. To assist Diamond Resorts employees dealing with unexpected life events, Cloobeck founded the Diamond Resorts International Team Member Crisis Fund (now the Diamond Resorts International Foundation) in 2012.

Cloobeck was chairman of the board of the Nevada Cancer Institute. In 2012, he endowed the Stephen J. Cloobeck '83 Endowed Fellowship at the Brandeis University International Business School. He was a founder of the Brent Shapiro Foundation for Drug Awareness.

On October 2, 2017, it was reported that Cloobeck donated $400,000 to the Las Vegas shooting GoFundMe campaign setup by law enforcement for benefit of victims.

== Politics ==
In June 2011, he donated $100,000 to Majority PAC, a PAC oriented to promoting Democratic candidates to the U.S. Senate. The donation was sent as a check from "JHJM Nevada I, LLC," which made the source not readily evident.

In December 2022, Cloobeck announced he had handed in his resignation to the Nevada State Athletic Commission. He stated his reason for leaving the commission was due to not being able to work with Governor-elect Joe Lombardo.

On November 5, 2024, Cloobeck announced his candidacy for governor in the 2026 California gubernatorial election. He withdrew from the race in November 2025 and endorsed Eric Swalwell.

In April 2026, after sexual misconduct allegations against Swalwell became public and Swalwell ended his gubernatorial campaign, Cloobeck told the New York Post that he was no longer supporting Swalwell and described himself as a Libertarian Republican.

== Media ==
Cloobeck has appeared on the US edition of Undercover Boss numerous times. Cloobeck first appeared in Season 3, Episode 1 (initially aired January 15, 2012). Cloobeck was also featured in Season 4, Episodes 16 and 17, which initially aired May 10, 2013 and May 17, 2013, respectively.

On November 7, 2017, Cloobeck appeared on MSNBC and said he told Democratic leaders he would "cut your money off" if they criticize the wealthy, saying: "I've talked to Schumer, I've talked to Wyden, I've talked to Pelosi and I've said if you use the term billionaire again, I'm done."

In February 2021, Cloobeck pledged $1 million to fund the name change of McCarran International Airport to Harry Reid International Airport.

== Personal life ==
Cloobeck was married to Canadian model Chantal Leduc from 1997 until their divorce 2018. Cloobeck was in a five month relationship with OnlyFans model Stefanie Gurzanski which began in July 2020. Following their breakup, Cloobeck sued Gurzanski for offenses including fraud, claiming that Gurzanski had misled him about her modeling career; in response, Gurzanski filed for a restraining order against Cloobeck. Responding to questions in a May 2025 podcast with The Daily Beast, Cloobeck said he was "naive to the dating scene" at the time and claimed the relationship ended with an apology letter from Gurzanski, which he read aloud.

== Legal issues ==
On May 12, 2026, Cloobeck surrendered to authorities a month after being charged with three counts of attempting to dissuade a witness and one count of making "annoying telephone calls." The charges are related to an alleged effort Cloobeck made to dissuade several witnesses from testifying in the criminal case of his fiancée, Adva Lavie. He was released from jail after posting a $300,000 bail.

On October 27, 2026, Cloobeck's mansion in Beverly Hills was raided by Federal Authorities.
