= Butch Ware =

American academic, rapper and politician (born 1974)

- Ware in 2025
- Born: 1974 (age 51–52); United States
- Education: University of Minnesota (BA); University of Pennsylvania (MA, PhD)
- Political party: Green

Rudolph "Butch" T. Ware III (born 1974), also known as Bilal Ware in the American Muslim community, is an American associate professor, political activist, and hip hop artist. Ware was the vice presidential nominee for the Green Party in 2024 and a candidate for governor of California in 2026. He is one half of the hip hop duo Slum Prophecy.

On the faculty at the University of California, Santa Barbara, Ware has been vocal about the murder of George Floyd in 2020 and the Gaza genocide. He has organized teach-ins, community education curricula, and other organizing initiatives. Ware has been active as a public intellectual, activist, artist, and organizer, claiming in public statements to support "communities across the country and around the world [challenging] imperialism, ethnic cleansing, and war". He advocates for building sustainable, peaceful alternatives rooted in African, Indigenous, and Abrahamic traditions.

He was a write-in candidate governor of California in the 2026 gubernatorial election.

== Education ==
Ware received his undergraduate degree from the University of Minnesota in 1997. He received his PhD in history in 2004 from the University of Pennsylvania where he was trained in African History, and Islamic Intellectual History. Ware cites his political influences as Malcolm X and Kwame Ture.

== Career ==
A historian of West Africa at the University of California, Santa Barbara, he first began teaching at Northwestern University, and later at the University of Michigan.

Ware is also one half of the hip hop duo Slum Prophecy. Less than two weeks before he began running for vice president, Slum Prophecy released an album titled Aqsa Flood in honor of those who perpetrated the October 7 attacks. He is currently an associate professor in the department of History at the University of California, Santa Barbara, and the founder and director of the Initiative for the Study of Race, Religion, and Revolution ("ISRAR")

=== Political career ===
==== 2024 vice presidential campaign ====
On August 16, 2024, Ware was selected by Jill Stein to be her running mate in the 2024 United States presidential election. The Green Party nominated them as their candidates the following day. Upon being nominated, Ware would state that a goal of his campaign would be to win over voters in the battleground states, particularly Arab voters who were opposed to Joe Biden's support for Israel in the Gaza War.

The Stein-Ware ticket received 862,049 votes nationally, 0.56% of the popular vote, finishing in 3rd place overall.

==== 2026 California gubernatorial campaign ====
On November 11, 2024, Ware announced that he would be running in 2026 as a candidate for Governor of California. In August, Ware participated in a gubernatorial debate hosted by the Service Employees International Union and held in Sacramento. All other candidates were Democrats. On September 15, CBS News Sacramento conducted an interview with Ware.

In early March, Ware failed to qualify for the June primary ballot for governor. Ware has disputed his disqualification, claiming he was incorrectly disqualified after receiving confusing communication from Secretary of State of California Shirley Weber's office. On March 26, a Sacramento judge rejected Ware's lawsuit, saying that Weber's office had plainly shown attempts to help Ware correct his filings." The same day, Ware posted a self-described "diss track" to his X account in which he called Weber Gavin Newsom's "house slave." Ware continued to run for governor as a write-in candidate, where he ultimately finished 13th.

Ware argued that the California Secretary of State's Office inappropriately disqualified him even prior to him filing the necessary tax documents for the June primary ballot race. Ware has also claimed that the 2019 state law requiring California gubernatorial candidates to turn in a minimum of five years of tax returns to qualify for the ballot is unconstitutional.

== Political positions ==
=== Abortion ===
When questioned (Note: 48:57 [...] [Interviewer:] do you believe there should be any limits on 49:03 abortion then[?] [Ware:] of course there should be limits on everything there there isn't there's almost nothing that should be 49:08 left you know completely un unregulated um you know uh but you know I think that that a lot of the kind of common sense 49:15 um you know uh uh uh regulations that most Americans agree on as a you know 49:21 essentially 6040 issues you know something like 16 weeks and and and other such you know I won't go into kind 49:28 of the the the fine points on it but of course there have to be um limitations there have to be regulations of of of 49:34 abortion without any question [...]) on legal limits for abortion in the United States, Ware voiced support for a vague restriction on abortion. After facing backlash from pro-choice activists, he later walked back this position. Ware has since stated that he believes that safe, legal, and accessible abortion is a fundamental right, and that restricting access disproportionately harms young, poor, and marginalized women.

=== Climate change ===
Ware is a firm advocate for aggressive climate action and a just transition to renewable energy. Ware views the climate crisis as a human-made disaster exacerbated by corporate greed and political complicity. He rejects the notion that wildfires, extreme weather, and environmental collapse are mere flukes, instead attributing them to decades of fossil fuel dependence and deregulation.

Ware's gubernatorial campaign prioritizes ending California's reliance on fossil fuels, holding corporate polluters accountable, and investing in clean energy solutions. He has criticized both major political parties for what he describes as "bowing to Big Oil", citing millions of dollars in lobbying by the oil and gas industry. Ware also advocates for climate justice, stating that Black, Brown, and working-class communities suffer first and worst from environmental destruction. He has pledged to fight corporate real estate interests that exploit disaster-stricken areas and ensure that recovery efforts center community resilience, sustainable infrastructure, and long-term environmental protections.

=== Foreign affairs ===
Ware's 2024 Green Party profile described the Gaza war as a genocide. In a 2025 post on X, he asserted that the death toll in Gaza exceeds estimates, stating, "They continue to throw around 60K+ as the death toll. Population based data and public health research indicates the real toll will be in the hundreds of thousands". He has also called for Israel to be wiped off the map in subsequent posts on X and prefers to call the country "The Zionist Entity" over the name Israel.

Ware has likened Hamas's 2023 surprise attack on Israel to Nat Turner's Rebellion, viewing Hamas as a resistance group against Israel's illegal occupation. He has also questioned the validity of the evidence of mass rapes committed by Hamas on October 7, 2023 and compared the accusations to the baseless claims lodged at Emmett Till prior to his murder.

In October 2024, Ware posted a tweet where he pointed out the environmental impact of war. In the post, he included Uyghurs as victims of genocide, which garnered backlash from users. In a reply, he stated, "Stop caping for Chinese racists. I have sat with Uyghurs myself who directly suffered. Get lost." In response to his position, Stein stated that she would educate herself on the topic.

=== LGBT+ rights ===
In an interview with YouTuber The Black Authority in late October 2024, when asked "do you agree with the idea of biological males playing in female sports", Ware stated: "I don't think that biological males should play in female sports. I think it gives an unfair [...] competitive advantage." Ware has stated that his comments were taken out of context by media outlets, Tweeting, "The remarks in question, presented in a hostile interview, were misrepresented through selective editing to suggest otherwise. In context, I was engaging in what I thought was a discussion of a nuanced policy on Olympic inclusion based on information shared by the IOC, not making a statement against trans inclusion."

In November 2025, Ware explained that he believed the decision of trans and queer children playing on certain gendered sports teams should not be up to executive or legislative bodies—rather, he expressed that the "governing bodies of sports should make those decisions."

=== Immigration ===
Ware is a staunch advocate forimmigrant rights and has centered his campaign on ending California's cooperation with U.S. Immigration and Customs Enforcement (ICE). Ware has strongly condemned Governor Gavin Newsom's decision to veto AB 15, a bill aimed at limiting the California Department of Corrections and Rehabilitation's (CDCR) collaboration with ICE. He has criticized the long-standing racial profiling and civil rights violations by ICE, arguing that the agency's actions undermine constitutional protections and disproportionately harm asylum seekers and immigrants fleeing economic, ecological, and political crises—many of which he attributes to U.S. foreign policy and corporate exploitation.

He believes that state cooperation with ICE not only disrupts immigrant communities but also erodes public trust in law enforcement, making neighborhoods more vulnerable to systemic injustice. As part of his campaign platform, Ware has pledged to enact policies that shield immigrant communities from federal overreach, advocating for a California government that serves all residents equitably, regardless of immigration status.

On X, formerly Twitter, Ware described ICE as "the American Gestapo", comparing the usage of force against African-Americans to the 1985 MOVE bombing and the Tulsa race massacre firebombings.

== Personal life ==
Ware is a Muslim convert. Ware stated in a podcast with The Thinking Muslim that he converted to Islam at the age of 15 after being introduced to it by The Autobiography of Malcolm X, and then reading the Quran. He follows West African Sufi traditions and stated that "the Sufi tradition that I know tethers together spirituality with social justice".

He has a son.

== Electoral history ==
2024 United States presidential election
Party	Candidate	Votes	%
Republican	Donald Trump and JD Vance	77,302,580	49.80%
Democratic	Kamala Harris and Tim Walz	75,017,613	48.32%
Green	Jill Stein and Butch Ware	862,049	0.56%
Independent	Robert F. Kennedy Jr. and Nicole Shanahan	756,393	0.49%
Libertarian	Chase Oliver and Mike ter Maat	650,126	0.42%

2026 California gubernatorial election
Party	Candidate	Votes	%
Democratic	Xavier Becerra	2,591,857	27.98
Republican	Steve Hilton	2,277,318	24.59
Democratic	Tom Steyer	2,110,707	22.79
Republican	Chad Bianco	941,708	10.17
Democratic	Katie Porter	403,908	4.36
Democratic	Matt Mahan	327,537	3.54
Democratic	Antonio Villaraigosa	104,107	1.12
Democratic	Tony Thurmond	63,762	0.69
Peace and Freedom	Ramsey Robinson	51,803	0.56
Democratic	Betty Yee (withdrawn)	40,873	0.44
Democratic	Eric Swalwell (withdrawn)	28,164	0.30
Republican	Tim Nelson	23,712	0.26
Green	Butch Ware (write-in)	22,493	0.24

== Books ==
Title	Year	ISBN
The Walking Qur'an: Islamic Education, Embodied Knowledge, and History in West Africa (Islamic Civilization and Muslim Networks)	2014	978-1469614328
Jihad of the Pen: The Sufi Literature of West Africa	2018	978-1617978722
Islam in West Africa (The New Edinburgh Islamic Surveys)	2020	978-1474439794

== Notes ==
Party political offices
Preceded by Angela Nicole Walker	Green nominee for Vice President of the United States; 2024	Most recent
