= Independent Voter Project =

American nonprofit organization

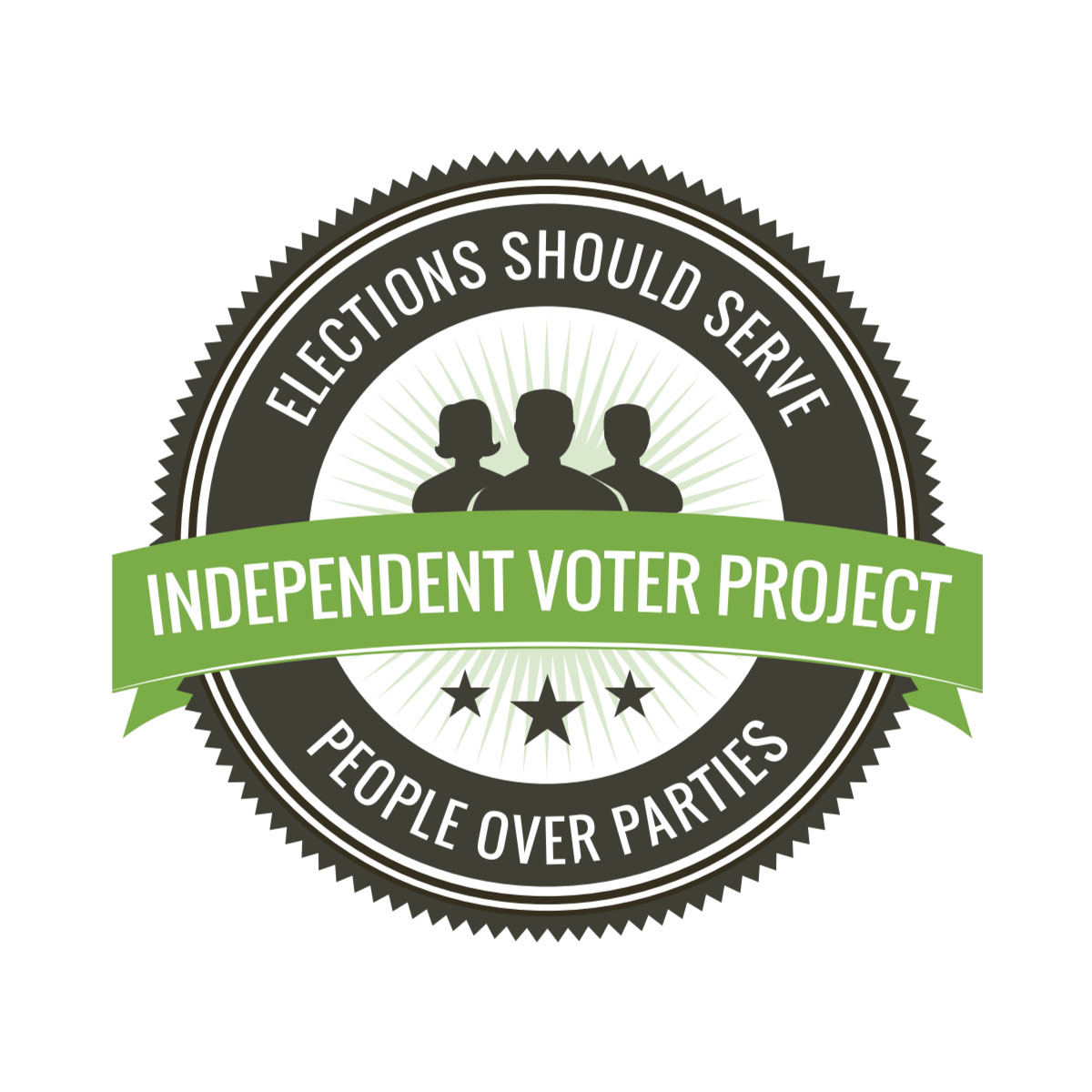

The Independent Voter Project (IVP) is a 501(c)(4) United States nonprofit organization. It launched in 2006 with a $1 million grant from John Moores. IVP seeks to re-engage nonpartisan voters and promote nonpartisan election reform through initiatives, litigation, and voter education.

The Independent Voter Project has a 501(c)(3) sister organization called the Foundation for Independent Voter Education (FIVE).

All IVP Board Members serve as volunteers. IVP and FIVE are co-publishers of IVN.us, an open news site that caters to independent voters and focuses on election reform issues.

IVP was founded by former California State Senator and Assemblymember Steve Peace, a registered Democrat, former California Assemblymember Jeff Marston, a Republican, and Dan Howle. Howle and Marston are the current co-chairs. Peace is no longer a board member but is still a financial contributor.

== Activities ==
IVP is best known for authoring California's nonpartisan blanket primary (top-two primary), which was enacted through Proposition 14 in 2010. Along with other political reforms, the top-two primary was credited with easing gridlock in state government. IVP authored Measure K to bring top-two elections to the city of San Diego; the measure passed in November 2016.

In 2014, IVP was one of a group of plaintiffs (including IndependentVoting.org and seven individual plaintiffs who were unaffiliated with either major political party) who filed a complaint in federal court alleging that New Jersey's current closed primary election process violated the federal and state constitutions. The plaintiffs specifically claimed that closed primaries violated their First Amendment right not to associate with a political party, and also claimed that the state constitution barred the state government from allocating money for the administration of primary elections. The IVP was unsuccessful; the complaint was dismissed in 2014 by the U.S. District Court for the District of New Jersey, and in 2015 this decision was affirmed by the U.S. Court of Appeals for the Third Circuit.

In 2016 and 2017, the IVP filed two amicus briefs in support of the plaintiffs in the case Level the Playing Field, et al. v. Federal Election Commission. The plaintiffs (the Green Party, Libertarian Party, and others) allege that the Federal Election Commission violated the Administrative Procedure Act in dismissing two administrative complaints regarding the Commission on Presidential Debates and "in denying a petition to engage in rulemaking to change the FEC's regulations regarding debate staging organizations."
