= Christian R. Grose =

American political scientist

Christian Robert Grose is an American political scientist. He is a professor of political science and public policy at the University of Southern California, academic director of the USC Schwarzenegger Institute for State and Global Policy, and served as director of the Political Science and International Relations PhD Program from 2015 to 2018. He studies behavioral elite decision making in politics, racial and ethnic politics, public policy, voting rights, political representation, and legislative politics.

== Early work and education ==
Grose graduated from Duke University in 1996 with a BA in political science and history. He then attended the University of Rochester, earning a PhD in political science in 2003.

Grose joined the political science faculty at Lawrence University and later Vanderbilt University. Grose is now on the political science faculty at the University of Southern California as professor of political science and public policy.

== Career ==
Grose has published more than forty peer-reviewed articles, chapters in edited volumes, and policy reports. His book Congress in Black and White: Race and Representation in Washington and at Home won the best book on race, ethnicity, and representation award in 2012 from the American Political Science Association section on Race, Ethnicity, and Politics. His research has been funded by the Russell Sage Foundation, the Leonardo DiCaprio Foundation, the MIT Election Data Science Center, and others. Grose's research has been profiled in the Washington Post, New York Times, National Public Radio, and other media outlets. His work on gerrymandering has been drawn upon by leading politicians like Arnold Schwarzenegger and Eric Holder. Grose also participates frequently in public facing workshops and seminars discussing his work with political practitioners like Dr. Charles Munger Jr., Senator Alex Padilla, and Michigan Secretary of State Jocelyn Benson.

In addition to his published research, in 2020, Grose led a team that administered the USC Schwarzenegger Institute nonpartisan democracy grants to local election administrators to open new polling places, which raised approximately $2.5 million for the University of Southern California. The funds went toward grants to 33 counties in eight states formerly protected by the Voting Rights Act. As part of this initiative, the Schwarzenegger Institute selected five election administrators to win Democracy Action Hero awards including Georgia Secretary of State Brad Raffensperger. He is currently conducting research on how best to improve voter access and voting rights based around this community-engaged work.

Grose also leads a team of faculty, administrators, and students to conduct the California Issues Poll, a representative survey of California registered voters that asked questions related to energy, the climate and housing.

As director of the Political Science and International Relations PhD program, Grose cofounded the Predoctoral Summer Institute for First-Generation Scholars and Scholars of Color which is targeted towards first-generation and minority undergraduate, masters, or law students who are interested in pursuing a PhD in the social sciences.
