= Riverside County Sheriff's Department =

Law enforcement agency in California

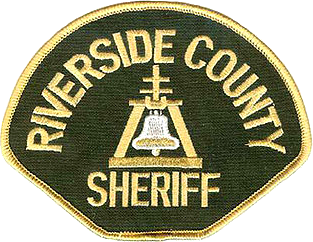
- Patch of the Riverside County Sheriff's Department

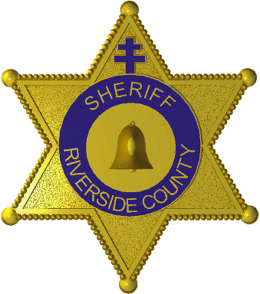
- Badge of the Riverside County Sheriff's Department

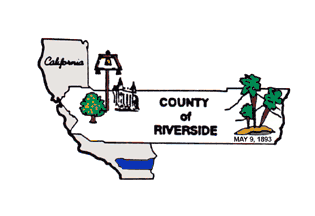
- Flag of Riverside County
- Common name: Riverside Sheriff's Office
- Abbreviation: RSO

Agency overview
- Formed: May 9, 1893; 133 years ago
- Employees: 3000+
- Annual budget: $502 million

Jurisdictional structure
- Operations jurisdiction: Riverside County, California, U.S.
- Map of Riverside County Sheriff's Department's jurisdiction.

Operational structure
- Headquarters: Riverside, California
- Sheriff-Coroner responsible: Chad Bianco
- Bureaus: 4: Coroner & Courts; Corrections; Field Operations; Support & Administration
- Divisions: 10: Administrative Services; Central Field Operations; Coroner & Courts; Corrections; East Field Operations; Professional Standards; Public Information Office; Special Operations; Support Services; West Field Operations

Facilities
- Stations: 12
- Jails: 5: Blythe Jail; Larry D. Smith Correctional Facility; Indio Jail; Robert Presley Detention Center; Southwest Detention Center

Website
- www.RiversideSheriff.org

The Riverside County Sheriff's Department, also known as the Riverside Sheriff's Office (RSO), is a law enforcement agency in Riverside County, in the U.S. state of California. The department serves unincorporated areas of Riverside County as well as some of the incorporated cities in the county by contract (see contract city). 15 of the county's 28 cities contract with the department for police and coroner services. The county hospital and one tribal community also contract with the department for proactive policing. Riverside County is home to 12 federally recognized Indian reservations. Absent proactive policing and traffic enforcement, the department is responsible for enforcing criminal law on all Native American tribal land within the county. This function is mandated by Public Law 280, enacted in 1953, which transferred the responsibility of criminal law enforcement on tribal land from the federal government to specified state governments including California. The department also operates the county's jail system.

In addition to performing law enforcement and corrections roles, the department performs the functions of the coroner's office and marshal's office. In its coroner function, the department is responsible for recovering deceased persons within the county and conducting autopsies. When California reorganized its judicial system in the early 21st century and eliminated state marshal's offices, the department assumed responsibility for state courts within the county, providing court security and service of warrants and court processes. The department also provides services such as air support, special weapons teams for high-risk critical incidents, forensics services and crime laboratories, homicide investigations, and academy training to smaller law enforcement agencies within the county and in surrounding counties.

== History ==
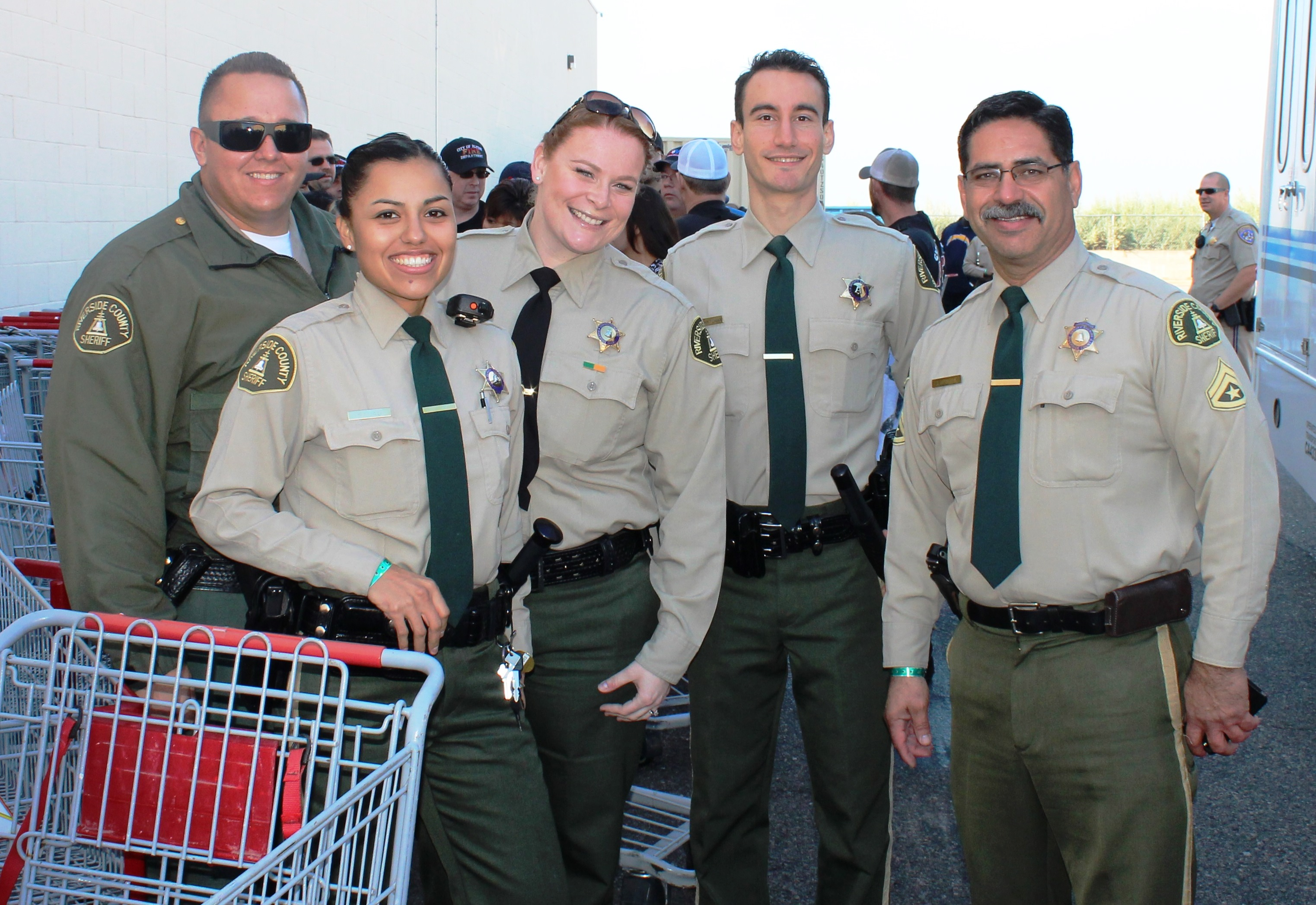
RCSD deputies in December 2014.

Riverside County was created from portions of San Bernardino and San Diego Counties on May 9, 1893. In the early history of the county, the sheriff's office was a one-person operation. Expanding to keep up with the county's explosive growth, the Riverside County Sheriff's Department is now the second-largest sheriff's department and third-largest police agency in California, with a staff of over 3,600.

The department made national headlines on May 9, 1980, when five heavily armed men robbed the Norco branch of Security Pacific Bank. Since dubbed the "Norco shootout", deputies responded to the bank robbery call and a prolonged gun battle and subsequent vehicle pursuit ensued. Units from the Los Angeles County Sheriff's Department, San Bernardino County Sheriff's Department, and California Highway Patrol contributed to the pursuit. The aftermath of the incident left 33 patrol cars damaged or completely destroyed, one helicopter shot down, three robbers imprisoned for life, two robbers dead, eight officers wounded, and one Riverside deputy killed in the line of duty.

=== Controversies ===
A lawsuit alleged that the department framed Horace Roberts for the murder of his girlfriend in 1998. In 2018 Roberts was exonerated by DNA evidence and released. The county paid $11 million to settle the matter.

The Riverside Sheriff's Department conducted an undercover sting operation targeting students at Chaparral High School in 2012. Operation Glasshouse was granted permission by Superintendent Timothy Ritter. The Riverside Sheriff's Department was accused of ignoring affluent students and choosing targets that belonged to minority groups and the mentally disabled.

An internal investigation by the Riverside County Sheriff's Department revealed that 25 employees cheated on the 2015 promotion exam. No employees were fired, and some were promoted after the 2017 exam.

In 2021, press reports indicated that Sheriff Chad Bianco was a due-paying member of the far-right anti-government militia the Oath Keepers in 2014. After the 2021 United States Capitol attack, Bianco observed said "the misguided and illegal actions of several individual members of Oath Keepers does not justify the mainstream media and FBI painting the whole group as an “anti-government militia.” He is also a member of the Constitutional Sheriffs and Peace Officers Association. He no longer thinks the senior leaders of the FBI are legitimate. “I lost faith in the FBI a long time ago. The line workers are first rate. Their administration has no business carrying a badge. They strayed from nonbiased law enforcement a long time ago.”

== County jail system ==
The Riverside County Sheriff's Department operates the county's jail system. The Riverside County jails provide short-term and long-term (depending on the type of sentencing) incarceration services for the county, jailing subjects arrested and charged with various types of crimes pending their court disposition as well as those convicted of crimes and sentenced. Services also include transportation of prisoners if necessary related to court appearances, and transferring prisoners between jurisdictions such as other counties, states, or the California Department of Corrections and Rehabilitation. Jails are staffed by fully sworn deputy sheriffs as well as specialized correctional deputies. The county's jail system consists of the Robert Presley Detention Center (RPDC) (named for former State Senator Robert B. Presley) in downtown Riverside, the Southwest Detention Center (SWDC) in French Valley near Murrieta, the Larry Smith Correctional Facility (SCF) in Banning, the Indio Jail, and the Blythe Jail.

The Riverside County Jail (RCJ) was renamed RPDC in 1989 with the completion of a new, modern jail facility across the street from the original jail. The "Old Jail" was originally constructed in 1933 and was built as part of the old historic courthouse annex. In 1963, an addition was made to the jail, which included dormitory-style housing units, a dispensary, detox cell, segregation cells, visiting area, and business office. In 1979, the county expanded the female section of the jail. The "Old Jail" was closed in 2011.

The Indio Jail facility is being completely rebuilt, with the old Indio Jail being demolished and turned into a parking lot upon completion of construction. The new Indio Jail will be the largest correctional facility in Riverside County, with the ability to house 1,626 beds. Construction began in March 2014 and is anticipated to be completed at the end of 2016, the facility be fully operational near the end of 2025.

Name	Location
Blythe Jail	Blythe, California
Cois M. Byrd Detention Center	Murrieta, California
John J. Benoit Detention Center	Indio, California
Larry D. Smith Correctional Facility	Banning, California
Robert Presley Detention Center	Riverside, California

== Academy ==
The Riverside Sheriff's Academy is located at the Ben Clark Public Safety Training Center (BCTC) near the March Air Reserve Base. Sheriff's academy training at BCTC is standardized and certified by the California Commission on Peace Officer Standards and Training (POST). Trainees receive a minimum of 24 weeks of intensive training. The county's municipal police departments as well as other regional law enforcement agencies utilize the department's academy to train their cadets/trainees as well. Upon successful completion of the academy, graduating Riverside County Deputy Sheriff Trainees also receive additional detention-specific training at the academy if they will be going to a jail posting for their first assignment (regardless of first assignment, all Sheriff's Deputies must eventually go to patrol if they wish to advance in rank/special assignment).

BCTC is also the location of the sheriff's corrections and dispatch academies. In addition, BCTC provides ongoing advanced career training for the department and surrounding agencies.

BCTC is a public safety training center jointly operated by the Riverside County Sheriff's Department and the Riverside County Fire Department in cooperation with the California Department of Forestry and Fire Protection, the California State Fire Marshal, the California Highway Patrol, and Riverside Community College.

== Contract cities and entities served ==
- Calimesa
- Coachella
- Eastvale
- Indian Wells
- Jurupa Valley
- La Quinta
- Lake Elsinore
- Moreno Valley
- Norco
- Palm Desert
- Perris
- Rancho Mirage
- San Jacinto
- Temecula
- Wildomar
- Agua Caliente Tribal Nation
- Anza-Borrego Desert State Park
- Augustine Tribal Nation
- Cabazon Band of Mission Indians
- Colorado Indian Tribal Nation
- De Luz Community Services District
- Morongo Indian Reservation
- Mt. San Jacinto College
- Pechanga Tribal Nation
- Riverside County Regional Medical Center
- Santa Rosa Tribal Nation
- Soboba Tribal Nation
- Southern Coachella Valley Community Services District
- Torres Martinez Tribal Nation
- Twenty-Nine Palms Tribal Nation

== Current and past sheriffs ==
The sheriff is elected for a position now called " Riverside County Sheriff-Coronor-Public Administrator." The election are nonpartisan. In November 2018, Sheriff Bianco defeated the incumbent, Stan Sniff.

#	Portrait	Name	Term in office	Length of service	Previous office
1		Fred Swope (1893-1895)	1893 – 1895	2 years	
2		William B. Johnson (1895-1899)	1895 – 1899	4 years	
3		P.M. Coburn (1899-1907)	1899 – 1907	8 years	
4		Frank Wilson (1907-1923)	1907 – 1923	16 years	
5		Sam Ryan (1923-1924)	1923 – 1924	1 year	
6		Clemens Sweeters (1924-1931)	1924 – 1931	7 years	
7		Carl Rayburn (1931-1952)	1931 – 1952	21 years	
8		Joe Rice (1952-1963)	1952 – 1963	11 years	
9		Bernard "Ben" Clark (1963-1986)	1963 – 1986	23 years	
10		Cois Byrd (1986-1994)	1986 – 1994	8 years	
11		Larry Smith (1994-2002)	1994 – 2002	8 years	
12		Bob Doyle (2003-2007)	2003 – 2007	4 years	
13		Stanley Sniff (2007-2018)	2007 – 2018	11 years	
14		Chad Bianco (2019-)	2019 – Incumbent	5 years	

== Organizational structure ==
The following represents the organization of the RCSD:

=== Bureaus ===
- Coroner & Courts
- Corrections
- Field Operations
- Support & Administration

=== Divisions ===
- Administrative Services
- Coroner & Courts
- Corrections
- East Field Operations
- Professional Standards
- Public Information Office
- Special Operations
- Support Services
- West Field Operations

=== Stations ===
Stations===

- Lake Matthews Station (serves the unincorporated communities of Temescal Valley, Mead Valley, and parts of unincorporated Corona)
- Cabazon Station (serves the city of Calimesa, the unincorporated communities of Cabazon, Cherry Valley, Whitewater, and the Morongo Indian Reservation)
- Colorado River Station (serves the far eastern portion of the county and the unincorporated territory outside the city of Blythe)
- Hemet Station (serves the unincorporated communities of Anza, Aguanga, East Hemet, Cahuilla, Fern Valley, Garner Valley, Homeland, Idyllwild, Mountain Center, Nuevo, Pine Cove, Pinyon Pines, Sage, Valle Vista, Winchester, Anza Borrego State Park, the Santa Rosa Indian Reservation, and the Mount San Jacinto and Mount Santa Rosa Wilderness)
- Jurupa Valley Station (serves the cities of Jurupa Valley, Eastvale, and Norco)
- Lake Elsinore Station (serves the cities of Wildomar, Canyon Lake, and Lake Elsinore)
- Moreno Valley Station (serves the city of Moreno Valley)
- Palm Desert Station (serves the cities of Indian Wells, Rancho Mirage, and Palm Desert and the unincorporated areas of Thousand Palms and Sky Valley)
- Perris Station (serves the city of Perris)
- San Jacinto Station (serves the City of San Jacinto and Mount San Jacinto College)
- Southwest Station (serves the city of Temecula and the unincorporated communities of French Valley and De Luz)
- Thermal Station (serves the cities of La Quinta and Coachella and the unincorporated areas of Bermuda Dunes, Thermal, Mecca, Indio Hills, North Shore, the Torres-Martinez Indian Reservation, and Oasis)

=== Other facilities ===
- Aviation
- Coroner/Public Administrator
- Ben Clark Training Center
- Dispatch Center
- Sheriff's Administration
- Special Investigations Bureau
- Courts/County Administration Building
- College of the Desert Public Safety Academy

== Fallen officers ==
As of January 2025, 29 Deputies and 3 K9s of the Riverside County Sheriff's Department have been killed in the line of duty.

== See also ==
- List of law enforcement agencies in California
