= Zacky Farms =

American food production company

Zacky Farms LLC was an American food production company in California. It was incorporated in 1955 by Sam Zacky's family and developed by his three sons—Harry, Al, and Bob—from retail to wholesale. Its primary factory was located in Central California.

At the time it folded in 2018, Zacky Farms employed at least 1,500 people in Los Angeles, Fresno (1,000 in 2009), Tulare, Kings County, and San Joaquin County. In 2009, the company was one of the top ten employers in Fresno and accounted for 0.48% of total employment in the city.

On October 9, 2012, Bloomberg News Service announced Zacky Farms filed for chapter 11 bankruptcy for the first time, with plans to reorganize after removing partner Richard Zacky. Zacky Farms came out of the bankruptcy in 2014 owned entirely by Lillian Zacky, Robert Zacky's widow.

On October 31, 2018, Zacky Farms LLC announced that they would be winding down operations and shutting down the Fresno, California location. Lillian Zacky, CEO of Zacky Farms LLC, stated in an email to employees at the Fresno, California location, "After four generations and an enormous effort to keep the company in sync with the fast pace of changing times, we no longer are able to keep up with business as usual. We have put our best foot forward but as we struggled in the current state of the industry conditions, it has been impossible for us to continue profitably".

At the time the company closed, all Zacky Farms products were Anti-Biotic Free (ABF) and produced in the state of California.

In November 2018, the company filed bankruptcy protection. Plant operations were cut down or closed.

Valley Chef Chicken Franks (Chinese: 廚師牌高級雞肉腸), one of Zacky Farms' meat products, was widely used for BBQ and breakfast in Hong Kong and Singapore.

== Products ==
- Breast of Turkey
- Classics Fully-Cooked Meats
- Culinary Classic Breast of Turkey
- Franks Bulk Packed
- Turkey Breast
- Turkey Breast Roast Ready To Cook
- LillianZ Ranch Chicken
- Sun Harvest
- Turkey Franks
- Chicken Franks
- Samuel's Ranch Free Range ABF Turkey
