= Anna Hall =

Anna Hall may refer to:

- Anna Maria Hall (1800–1881), Irish novelist
- Anna E. Hall (1870–1964), American Methodist deaconess and missionary
- Anna Gertrude Hall (1882–1967), American author of children's literature
- Anna Hall Roosevelt (1863–1892), mother of Eleanor Roosevelt
- Anna E. Reid Hall (1857–1928), American artist and art collector
- Anna Sophina Hall (1857–1924), American suffragist and eugenics proponent
- Anna Hall (footballer) (born 1979), Swedish footballer
- Anna Hall (volleyball) (born 1999), American volleyball player
- Anna Hall (heptathlete) (born 2001), American heptathlete and pentathlete

== See also ==
- Ann Hall (1792–1863), American painter
- Anne Hall, American diplomat
- Annie Hall, a 1977 film by Woody Allen
- Annie Hall (businesswoman) (died 2019), British businesswoman, high sheriff of Derbyshire
