= 2022 California gubernatorial election =

- November 8, 2022
- Turnout: 50.80% (▼7.65 pp)
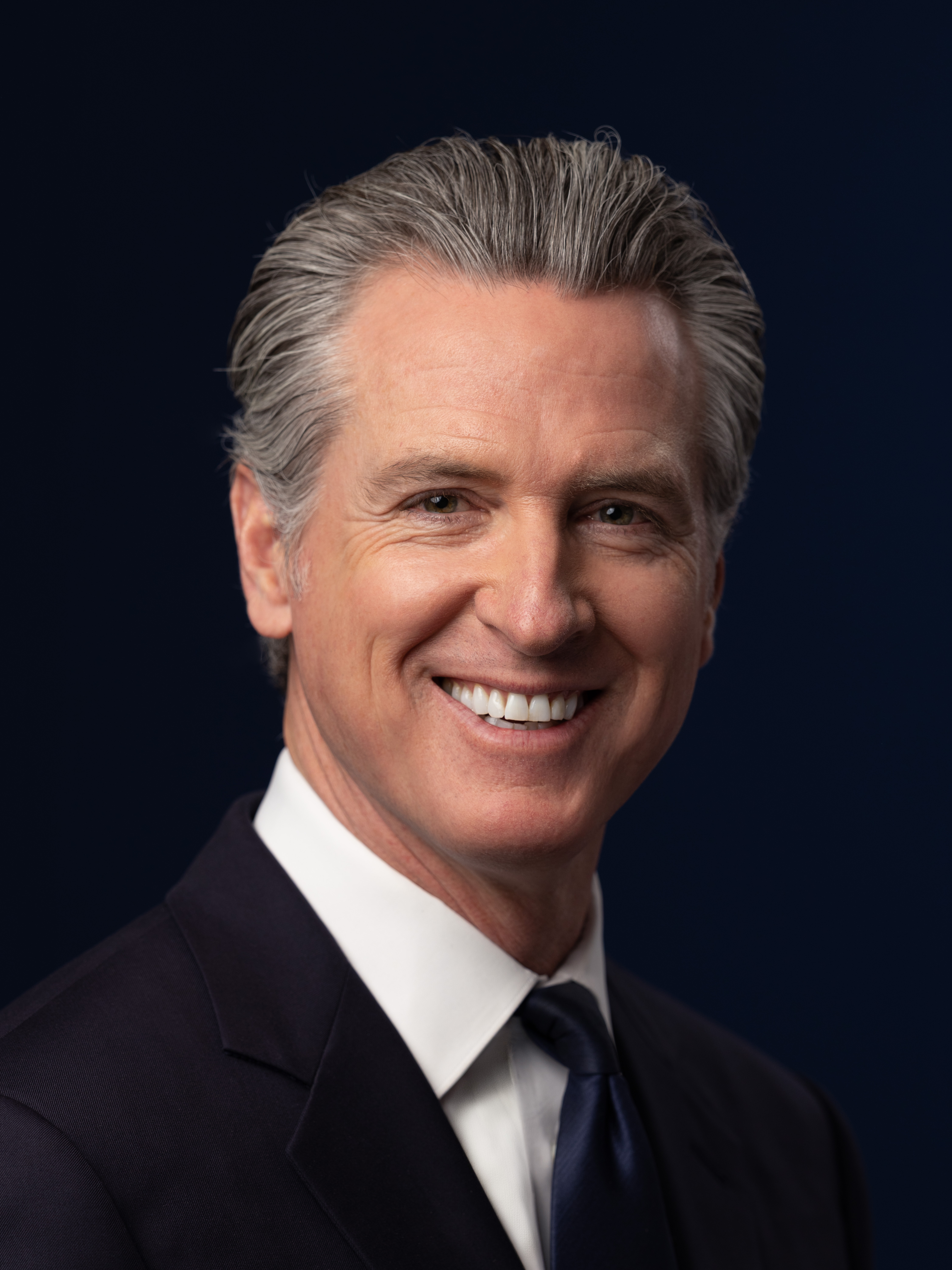

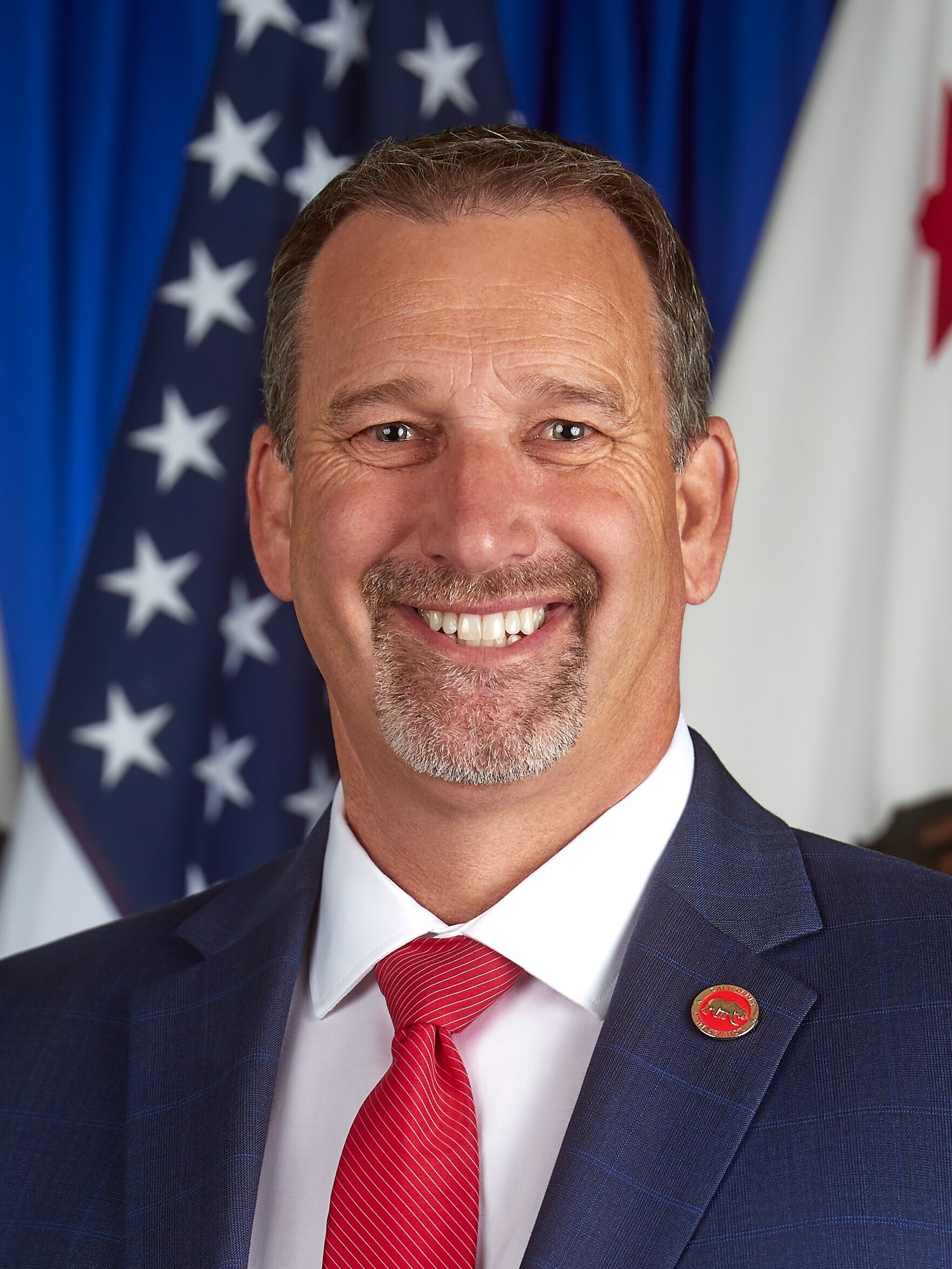
Candidate	Gavin Newsom	Brian Dahle
Party	Democratic	Republican
Popular vote	6,470,104	4,462,914
Percentage	59.18%	40.82%
- Newsom: 50–60% 60–70% 70–80% 80–90% >90% Dahle: 50–60% 60–70% 70–80% 80–90%
Governor before election
Gavin Newsom
Democratic
Elected Governor
Gavin Newsom
Democratic

The 2022 California gubernatorial election was held on November 8, 2022, to elect the governor of California, with the statewide top-two primary election taking place on June 7, 2022. Incumbent Democratic Party Governor Gavin Newsom was elected to a second term after surviving a recall election in 2021 during his first term.

The elections featured universal mail-in ballots; in-person voting was also available. All statewide elected offices are currently held by Democrats. Newsom won 61.9% of the vote in both the 2018 gubernatorial election and the 2021 recall election. He received 55.9% of the top-two primary vote and faced Republican Party state senator Brian Dahle, who received 17.7% of the primary vote, in the general election.

Newsom received 59.2% of the vote to Dahle's 40.8%, a smaller margin of victory than in 2018 and 2021 and the smallest since 2010. Dahle flipped five counties that Newsom carried in 2018: Lake, Merced (which had previously voted to recall Newsom in 2021), Orange, San Bernardino, and San Joaquin. Dahle also received 32% of the vote in Los Angeles County, the highest percentage received by a Republican in the state's most populous county since 2014. Additionally, Dahle managed to carry two congressional districts represented by Democrats: CA-09 and CA-47. This was the fourth consecutive California gubernatorial election in which a Democratic candidate won.

== Candidates ==
=== Democratic Party ===
==== Advanced to general ====
- Gavin Newsom, incumbent governor

==== Eliminated in primary ====
- Anthony Fanara, restaurant owner
- Armando Perez-Serrato, businessman and candidate in the 2021 recall election
- Joel Ventresca, former Service Employees International Union committee member, retired airport analyst and perennial candidate (Note: Candidate for San Francisco Board of Supervisors in 1977, 1979, and 2002, candidate for Mayor of San Francisco in 1995, 1999, and 2019, and candidate in the 2021 recall election)

=== Republican Party ===
==== Advanced to general ====
- Brian Dahle, state senator from the 1st district and former Minority Leader of the California State Assembly

==== Eliminated in primary ====
- Ronald A. Anderson, contractor and businessman
- Gurinder Bhangoo (write-in)
- Shawn Collins, U.S. Navy veteran and attorney
- Ron Jones, former police officer
- Jenny Rae Le Roux, entrepreneur and candidate in the 2021 recall election
- David Lozano, attorney and candidate in the 2021 recall election
- Daniel R. Mercuri, businessman, candidate in the 2021 recall election and for California's 25th congressional district in 2020
- Cristian Raul Morales, manufacturing executive
- Robert C. Newman, psychologist and candidate in the 2021 recall election
- Lonnie Sortor, business owner
- Anthony Trimino, entrepreneur and candidate in the 2021 recall election
- Major Williams, entrepreneur and write-in candidate in the 2021 recall election
- Leo S. Zacky, businessman, broadcaster, and candidate in the 2021 recall election

==== Declined ====
- Larry Elder, conservative talk show host, author, and candidate in the 2021 recall election
- Kevin Faulconer, former mayor of San Diego (2014–2020) and candidate in the 2021 recall election
- Kimberly Guilfoyle, television personality, former advisor to Donald Trump and ex-wife of Gavin Newsom
- Kevin Kiley, state assemblyman from the 6th district (2016–2022) and candidate in the 2021 recall election (ran for CA-03)

=== Green Party ===
==== Eliminated in primary ====
- Heather Collins, small business owner and candidate in the 2021 recall election
- Luis J. Rodriguez, poet, novelist, and candidate for governor in 2014

=== American Independent Party ===
==== Eliminated in primary ====
- Jeff Scott (write-in)

=== No party preference ===
==== Eliminated in primary ====
- Serge Fiankan, small business owner
- James G. Hanink, former Loyola Marymount University philosophy professor and candidate in the 2021 recall election (Note: Hanink was listed on the ballot as "no party preference" and listed in the official Voter Information Guide as "no qualified party preference" because the party with which Hanink was registered, the American Solidarity Party, did not have ballot access at the time the ballot was printed.)
- Woodrow Sanders III, entrepreneur and engineer
- Frederic C. Schultz, attorney
- Reinette Senum, former mayor of Nevada City
- Michael Shellenberger, environmental policy writer and Democratic candidate for governor in 2018
- Bradley Zink, children's book author

==== Withdrew ====
- Adriel Hampton, digital media businessman and candidate for California's 10th congressional district in 2009

== Endorsements ==
Brian Dahle (R)

Organizations

- California Republican Party
James G. Hanink (NPP)

Political Parties

- American Solidarity Party

Individuals

- Brian T. Carroll, teacher, candidate for California's 22nd congressional district in 2018 and president in 2020
- Mike Maturen, candidate for president in 2016
Gavin Newsom (D)

Newspapers and other media

- Los Angeles Times

Organizations

- AFSCME California (American Federation of State, County and Municipal Employees)
- California Democratic Party
- California Faculty Association
- California Federation of Teachers
- California Teachers Association
- Equality California
- March On
- NARAL Pro-Choice California
- National Education Association
- Stonewall Democrats
Luis J. Rodriguez (G)

Political parties

- Green Party of California
- Peace and Freedom Party
Michael Shellenberger (NPP)

Organizations

- Howard Jarvis Taxpayers Association

Individuals

- Douglas Murray, author, journalist and public commentator
- Steven Pinker, author and public intellectual

== Primary election ==
The list of candidates was announced on Mar 31, 2022 by the secretary of state.

=== Polling ===
Poll source	Date(s) administered	Sample size (Note: Key: A – all adults RV – registered voters LV – likely voters V – unclear)	Margin of error	Ronald Anderson (R)	Shawn Collins (R)	Brian Dahle (R)	Anthony Fanara (D)	Gavin Newsom (D)	Michael Shellenberger (I)	Other	Undecided
Berkeley IGS	May 24–31, 2022	3,438 (LV)	± 2.2%	1%	3%	10%	1%	50%	5%	15% (Note: Anthony Trimino (R) with 3%; Jenny Rae Le Roux (R) and Major Williams (R) with 2%; Ron Jones (R), David Lozano (R), Daniel Mercuri (R), Robert Newman II (R), Armando Perez-Serrato (D), Luis Javier Rodriguez (G), Joel Ventresca (D), and Leo Zacky (R) with 1%; Heather Collins (G), Serge Fiankan (I), James Hanink (I), Cristian Raul Morales (R), Woodrow Sanders III (I), Frederic Schultz (I), Reinette Senum (I), Lonnie Sortor (R), and Bradley Zink (I) with 0%)	16%
SurveyUSA	May 13–15, 2022	709 (LV)	± 4.5%	7%	5%	7%	5%	40%	2%	16% (Note: Heather Collins (G), Ron Jones (R), and David Lozano (R) with 2%; Jenny Rae Le Roux (R), Daniel Mercuri (R), Cristian Raul Morales (R), Robert Newman II (R), Armando Perez-Serrato (D), Lonnie Sortor (R), Anthony Trimino (R), Joel Ventresca (D), Major Williams (R), and Leo Zacky (R) with 1%; Serge Fiankan (I), James Hanink (I), Luis Javier Rodriguez (G), Woodrow Sanders III (I), Frederic Schultz (I), Reinette Senum (I), and Bradley Zink (I) with 0%)	18%

=== Results ===
County results Newsom: 20–30%; 30–40%; 40–50%; 50–60%; 60–70%; 70–80%; Dahle: 30–40%; 40–50%; 50–60%; 60–70%

Congressional district results Newsom: 30–40%; 40–50%; 50–60%; 60–70%; 70–80%; 80–90%; Dahle: 30–40%; 40–50%

Primary results
Party	Candidate	Votes	%
Democratic	Gavin Newsom (incumbent)	3,945,728	55.9
Republican	Brian Dahle	1,252,800	17.7
No party preference	Michael Shellenberger	290,286	4.1
Republican	Jenny Rae Le Roux	246,665	3.5
Republican	Anthony Trimino	246,322	3.5
Republican	Shawn Collins	173,083	2.5
Green	Luis J. Rodriguez	124,672	1.8
Republican	Leo S. Zacky	94,521	1.3
Republican	Major Williams	92,580	1.3
Republican	Robert C. Newman II	82,849	1.2
Democratic	Joel Ventresca	66,885	0.9
Republican	David Lozano	66,542	0.9
Republican	Ronald A. Anderson	53,554	0.8
No party preference	Reinette Senum	53,015	0.8
Democratic	Armando Perez-Serrato	45,474	0.6
Republican	Ron Jones	38,337	0.5
Republican	Daniel R. Mercuri	36,396	0.5
Green	Heather Collins	29,690	0.4
Democratic	Anthony Fanara	25,086	0.4
Republican	Cristian Raul Morales	22,304	0.3
Republican	Lonnie Sortor	21,044	0.3
No party preference	Frederic C. Schultz	17,502	0.2
No party preference	Woodrow Sanders III	16,204	0.2
No party preference	James G. Hanink	10,110	0.1
No party preference	Serge Fiankan	6,201	0.1
No party preference	Bradley Zink	5,997	0.1
American Independent	Jeff Scott (write-in)	13	0.0
Republican	Gurinder Bhangoo (write-in)	8	0.0
Total votes		7,063,868	100.0

== General election ==
=== Predictions ===
Source	Ranking	As of
The Cook Political Report	Solid D	October 26, 2022
Inside Elections	Solid D	November 3, 2022
Sabato's Crystal Ball	Safe D	November 7, 2022
Politico	Solid D	April 1, 2022
RCP	Safe D	January 10, 2022
Fox News	Solid D	May 12, 2022
538	Solid D	November 8, 2022
Elections Daily	Safe D	November 7, 2022

=== Debates ===
Governor Gavin Newsom and State Senator Brian Dahle met on October 23 for their only debate.

2022 California gubernatorial debate
No.	Date	Host	Moderators	Link	Participants	
P Participant A Absent N Non-invitee I Invitee W Withdrawn						
P Participant A Absent N Non-invitee I Invitee W Withdrawn					Gavin Newsom	Brian Dahle
1	October 23, 2022	KQED	Scott Shafer; Marisa Lagos	YouTube	P	P

=== Polling ===
Aggregate polls

Source of poll aggregation	Dates administered	Dates updated	Gavin Newsom (D)	Brian Dahle (R)	Other (Note: Calculated by taking the difference of 100% and all other candidates combined.)	Margin
RealClearPolitics	September 22 – October 23, 2022	November 3, 2022	55.0%	34.3%	10.7%	Newsom +20.7%
FiveThirtyEight	September 2 – November 8, 2022	November 8, 2022	59.6%	38.7%	1.7%	Newsom +20.9%
270ToWin	October 27 – November 7, 2022	November 8, 2022	57.4%	37.0%	5.6%	Newsom +20.4%
Average			57.3%	36.7%	6.0%	Newsom +20.6%

Poll source	Date(s) administered	Sample size	Margin of error	Gavin Newsom (D)	Brian Dahle (R)	Other	Undecided
Research Co.	November 4–6, 2022	450 (LV)	± 4.6%	56%	37%	7%	
USC	October 30 – November 2, 2022	802 (RV)	± 3.5%	62%	38%	–	–
UC Berkeley	October 25–31, 2022	5,972 (LV)	± 2.0%	58%	37%	–	4%
ActiVote	July 29 – October 27, 2022	200 (LV)	± 7.0%	61%	39%	–	–
Public Policy Institute of California	October 14–23, 2022	1,060 (LV)	± 5.4%	55%	36%	4% (Note: "Neither/Would not vote" with 4%)	5%
SurveyUSA	October 7–10, 2022	1,013 (LV)	± 4.4%	57%	35%	–	8%
UC Berkeley	September 22–27, 2022	6,939 (LV)	± 2.5%	53%	32%	2% (Note: "Other (write-in)" with 2%)	13%
Public Policy Institute of California	September 2–11, 2022	1,060 (LV)	± 5.4%	58%	31%	5% (Note: "Would not vote" with 5%)	7%
UC Berkeley	August 9–15, 2022	9,254 (RV)	± 2.0%	52%	25%	4%	19%
UC Berkeley	August 9–15, 2022	6,321 (LV)	± 2.4%	55%	31%	3%	11%

Hypothetical polling

Gavin Newsom vs. Kevin Faulconer

Poll source	Date(s) administered	Sample size	Margin of error	Gavin Newsom (D)	Kevin Faulconer (R)	Undecided
Berkeley IGS	August 30 – September 6, 2021	9,809 (RV)	± 2.3%	49%	27%	24%

Gavin Newsom vs. John Cox

Poll source	Date(s) administered	Sample size	Margin of error	Gavin Newsom (D)	John Cox (R)	Undecided
Berkeley IGS	August 30 – September 6, 2021	9,809 (RV)	± 2.3%	51%	26%	23%

Gavin Newsom vs. Larry Elder

Poll source	Date(s) administered	Sample size	Margin of error	Gavin Newsom (D)	Larry Elder (R)	Undecided
Berkeley IGS	August 30 – September 6, 2021	9,809 (RV)	± 2.3%	52%	30%	18%

Gavin Newsom vs. Kevin Kiley

Poll source	Date(s) administered	Sample size	Margin of error	Gavin Newsom (D)	Kevin Kiley (R)	Undecided
Berkeley IGS	August 30 – September 6, 2021	9,809 (RV)	± 2.3%	50%	25%	25%

=== Results ===
2022 California gubernatorial election
Party	Candidate	Votes	%	±%
Democratic	Gavin Newsom (incumbent)	6,470,104	59.18%	−2.77
Republican	Brian Dahle	4,462,914	40.82%	+2.77
Total votes		10,933,018	100.00%	N/A
Turnout		11,146,620	50.80%	−12.48
Registered electors		21,940,274		
Democratic hold				

==== By county ====
By county

County	Gavin Newsom Democratic		Brian Dahle Republican		Margin		Total votes
County	#	%	#	%	#	%	Total votes
Alameda	387,046	79.32	100,923	20.68	286,123	58.64	487,969
Alpine	363	58.64	256	41.36	107	17.29	619
Amador	6,027	32.31	12,628	67.69	-6,601	-35.38	18,655
Butte	31,502	43.49	40,939	56.51	-9,437	-13.03	72,441
Calaveras	7,103	33.44	14,137	66.56	-7,034	-33.12	21,240
Colusa	1,553	27.92	4,009	72.08	-2,456	-44.16	5,562
Contra Costa	265,371	68.31	123,132	31.69	142,239	36.61	388,503
Del Norte	3,264	38.97	5,111	61.03	-1,847	-22.05	8,375
El Dorado	34,534	38.95	54,137	61.05	-19,603	-22.11	88,671
Fresno	98,417	44.92	120,668	55.08	-22,251	-10.16	219,085
Glenn	1,930	24.34	6,000	75.66	-4,070	-51.32	7,930
Humboldt	29,541	61.80	18,257	38.20	11,284	23.61	47,798
Imperial	16,711	55.95	13,158	44.05	3,553	11.90	29,869
Inyo	3,382	45.23	4,095	54.77	-713	-9.54	7,477
Kern	69,706	36.94	119,006	63.06	-49,300	-26.12	188,712
Kings	9,389	34.89	17,523	65.11	-8,134	-30.22	26,912
Lake	9,771	48.54	10,360	51.46	-589	-2.93	20,131
Lassen	1,444	15.75	7,726	84.25	-6,282	-68.51	9,170
Los Angeles	1,620,053	67.81	769,174	32.19	850,879	35.61	2,389,227
Madera	13,283	35.94	23,678	64.06	-10,395	-28.12	36,961
Marin	95,289	80.03	23,775	19.97	71,514	60.06	119,064
Mariposa	2,944	37.55	4,896	62.45	-1,952	-24.90	7,840
Mendocino	19,031	62.61	11,363	37.39	7,668	25.23	30,394
Merced	25,200	45.59	30,073	54.41	-4,873	-8.82	55,273
Modoc	687	20.13	2,725	79.87	-2,038	-59.73	3,412
Mono	2,493	54.56	2,076	45.44	417	9.13	4,569
Monterey	65,262	63.90	36,867	36.10	28,395	27.80	102,129
Napa	32,437	64.73	17,671	35.27	14,766	29.47	50,108
Nevada	26,655	52.54	24,082	47.46	2,573	5.07	50,737
Orange	464,206	48.51	492,734	51.49	-28,528	-2.98	956,940
Placer	73,619	40.43	108,450	59.57	-34,831	-19.13	182,069
Plumas	3,083	35.71	5,550	64.29	-2,467	-28.58	8,633
Riverside	285,000	47.83	310,901	52.17	-25,901	-4.35	595,901
Sacramento	274,680	57.51	202,933	42.49	71,747	15.02	477,613
San Benito	10,428	53.26	9,150	46.74	1,278	6.53	19,578
San Bernardino	215,391	47.39	239,109	52.61	-23,718	-5.22	454,500
San Diego	574,121	55.78	455,107	44.22	119,014	11.56	1,029,228
San Francisco	257,402	85.38	44,064	14.62	213,338	70.77	301,466
San Joaquin	85,498	48.22	91,827	51.78	-6,329	-3.57	177,325
San Luis Obispo	61,166	51.13	58,464	48.87	2,702	2.26	119,630
San Mateo	185,599	74.98	61,918	25.02	123,681	49.97	247,517
Santa Barbara	80,648	59.57	54,726	40.43	25,922	19.15	135,374
Santa Clara	379,377	70.01	162,518	29.99	216,859	40.02	541,895
Santa Cruz	79,117	75.95	25,052	24.05	54,065	51.90	104,169
Shasta	18,607	27.16	49,913	72.84	-31,306	-45.69	68,520
Sierra	529	34.28	1,014	65.72	-485	-31.43	1,543
Siskiyou	6,326	35.69	11,397	64.31	-5,071	-28.61	17,723
Solano	77,769	59.54	52,850	40.46	24,919	19.08	130,619
Sonoma	140,041	70.92	57,413	29.08	82,628	41.85	197,454
Stanislaus	55,311	42.23	75,656	57.77	-20,345	-15.53	130,967
Sutter	9,082	32.31	19,024	67.69	-9,942	-35.37	28,106
Tehama	5,024	24.35	15,607	75.65	-10,583	-51.30	20,631
Trinity	1,860	41.09	2,667	58.91	-807	-17.83	4,527
Tulare	33,273	36.43	58,053	63.57	-24,780	-27.13	91,326
Tuolumne	8,471	36.47	14,759	63.53	-6,288	-27.07	23,230
Ventura	153,226	54.54	127,709	45.46	25,517	9.08	280,935
Yolo	44,328	66.03	22,807	33.97	21,521	32.06	67,135
Yuba	6,534	33.28	13,097	66.72	-6,563	-33.43	19,631
Totals	6,470,104	59.18	4,462,914	40.82	2,007,190	18.36	10,933,018

Counties that flipped from Democratic to Republican

- Lake (largest municipality: Clearlake)
- Merced (largest municipality: Merced)
- Orange (largest municipality: Anaheim)
- San Bernardino (largest municipality: San Bernardino)
- San Joaquin (largest municipality: Stockton)

==== By congressional district ====
Newsom won 38 of 52 congressional districts, with the remaining 14 going to Dahle, including two that elected Democrats.

District	Newsom	Dahle	Representative
1st	33%	67%	Doug LaMalfa
2nd	71%	29%	Jared Huffman
3rd	43%	57%	Kevin Kiley
4th	63%	37%	Mike Thompson
5th	37%	63%	Tom McClintock
6th	54%	46%	Ami Bera
7th	64%	36%	Doris Matsui
8th	74%	26%	John Garamendi
9th	48%	52%	Josh Harder
10th	65%	35%	Mark DeSaulnier
11th	86%	14%	Nancy Pelosi
12th	90%	10%	Barbara Lee
13th	46%	54%	John Duarte
14th	68%	32%	Eric Swalwell
15th	76%	24%	Jackie Speier (117th Congress)
15th	76%	24%	Kevin Mullin (118th Congress)
16th	73%	27%	Anna Eshoo
17th	71%	29%	Ro Khanna
18th	68%	32%	Zoe Lofgren
19th	65%	35%	Jimmy Panetta
20th	30%	70%	Kevin McCarthy
21st	51%	49%	Jim Costa
22nd	48%	52%	David Valadao
23rd	39%	61%	Jay Obernolte
24th	59%	41%	Salud Carbajal
25th	53%	47%	Raul Ruiz
26th	54%	46%	Julia Brownley
27th	49%	51%	Mike Garcia
28th	63%	37%	Judy Chu
29th	73%	27%	Tony Cárdenas
30th	75%	25%	Adam Schiff
31st	58%	42%	Grace Napolitano
32nd	66%	34%	Brad Sherman
33rd	55%	45%	Pete Aguilar
34th	82%	18%	Jimmy Gomez
35th	55%	45%	Norma Torres
36th	67%	33%	Ted Lieu
37th	85%	15%	Karen Bass (117th Congress)
37th	85%	15%	Sydney Kamlager-Dove (118th Congress)
38th	58%	42%	Linda Sánchez
39th	55%	45%	Mark Takano
40th	45%	55%	Young Kim
41st	45%	55%	Ken Calvert
42nd	67%	33%	Lucille Roybal-Allard (117th Congress)
42nd	67%	33%	Robert Garcia (118th Congress)
43rd	78%	22%	Maxine Waters
44th	69%	31%	Nanette Barragán
45th	49%	51%	Michelle Steel
46th	60%	40%	Lou Correa
47th	49.7%	50.3%	Katie Porter
48th	38%	62%	Darrell Issa
49th	50.4%	49.6%	Mike Levin
50th	61%	39%	Scott Peters
51st	60%	40%	Sara Jacobs
52nd	63%	37%	Juan Vargas

==== By municipality ====
By municipality

Official outcome by city and unincorporated areas of counties, of which Newsom won 330 & Dahle won 209.
City	County	Gavin Newsom Democratic		Brian Dahle Republican		Margin		Total Votes	2021 to 2022 Swing% (Note: Democratic margins are compared to the "No" margins from the 2021 recall vote & Republican margins are compared to the "Yes" margins from the 2021 recall vote.)
City	County	#	%	#	%	#	%	Total Votes	2021 to 2022 Swing%
Alameda	Alameda	25,182	82.25%	5,434	17.75%	19,748	64.50%	30,616	-3.62%
Albany	Alameda	7,309	90.83%	738	9.17%	6,571	81.66%	8,047	-1.18%
Berkeley	Alameda	43,972	94.66%	2,480	5.34%	41,492	89.32%	46,452	0.01%
Dublin	Alameda	12,131	69.29%	5,376	30.71%	6,755	38.58%	17,507	-6.20%
Emeryville	Alameda	3,451	91.56%	318	8.44%	3,133	83.13%	3,769	1.38%
Fremont	Alameda	39,087	69.76%	16,941	30.24%	22,146	39.53%	56,028	-8.59%
Hayward	Alameda	24,015	75.90%	7,625	24.10%	16,390	51.80%	31,640	-6.27%
Livermore	Alameda	19,878	58.61%	14,035	41.39%	5,843	17.23%	33,913	-5.07%
Newark	Alameda	7,896	70.34%	3,330	29.66%	4,566	40.67%	11,226	-8.40%
Oakland	Alameda	121,065	92.15%	10,309	7.85%	110,756	84.31%	131,374	-0.62%
Piedmont	Alameda	5,314	83.49%	1,051	16.51%	4,263	66.98%	6,365	-5.42%
Pleasanton	Alameda	17,912	63.64%	10,236	36.36%	7,676	27.27%	28,148	-8.00%
San Leandro	Alameda	17,604	76.53%	5,399	23.47%	12,205	53.06%	23,003	-5.06%
Union City	Alameda	13,253	73.79%	4,708	26.21%	8,545	47.58%	17,961	-9.15%
Unincorporated Area	Alameda	28,977	69.12%	12,943	30.88%	16,034	38.25%	41,920	-6.57%
Unincorporated Area	Alpine	363	58.64%	256	41.36%	107	17.29%	619	-4.99%
Amador	Amador	80	67.23%	39	32.77%	41	34.45%	119	3.46%
Ione	Amador	620	25.20%	1,840	74.80%	-1,220	-49.59%	2,460	-4.97%
Jackson	Amador	861	39.14%	1,339	60.86%	-478	-21.73%	2,200	-6.43%
Plymouth	Amador	170	32.02%	361	67.98%	-191	-35.97%	531	-2.51%
Sutter Creek	Amador	551	41.27%	784	58.73%	-233	-17.45%	1,335	-3.55%
Unincorporated Area	Amador	3,745	31.18%	8,265	68.82%	-4,520	-37.64%	12,010	-5.73%
Biggs	Butte	134	25.92%	383	74.08%	-249	-48.16%	517	-11.69%
Chico	Butte	18,962	56.37%	14,678	43.63%	4,284	12.73%	33,640	-4.02%
Gridley	Butte	607	36.33%	1,064	63.67%	-457	-27.35%	1,671	-7.26%
Oroville	Butte	1,633	36.08%	2,893	63.92%	-1,260	-27.84%	4,526	-1.38%
Paradise	Butte	1,231	31.76%	2,645	68.24%	-1,414	-36.48%	3,876	-5.73%
Unincorporated Area	Butte	8,935	31.67%	19,276	68.33%	-10,341	-36.66%	28,211	-4.69%
Angels	Calaveras	618	35.56%	1,120	64.44%	-502	-28.88%	1,738	-5.07%
Unincorporated Area	Calaveras	6,485	33.25%	13,017	66.75%	-6,532	-33.49%	19,502	-3.99%
Colusa	Colusa	516	29.27%	1,247	70.73%	-731	-41.46%	1,763	-11.68%
Williams	Colusa	321	44.34%	403	55.66%	-82	-11.33%	724	-20.53%
Unincorporated Area	Colusa	716	23.28%	2,359	76.72%	-1,643	-53.43%	3,075	-8.25%
Antioch	Contra Costa	18,105	67.62%	8,670	32.38%	9,435	35.24%	26,775	-8.19%
Brentwood	Contra Costa	12,010	53.29%	10,525	46.71%	1,485	6.59%	22,535	-5.99%
Clayton	Contra Costa	3,088	53.91%	2,640	46.09%	448	7.82%	5,728	-10.58%
Concord	Contra Costa	25,874	66.24%	13,185	33.76%	12,689	32.49%	39,059	-7.31%
Danville	Contra Costa	12,266	57.83%	8,943	42.17%	3,323	15.67%	21,209	-7.61%
El Cerrito	Contra Costa	10,562	89.79%	1,201	10.21%	9,361	79.58%	11,763	-0.63%
Hercules	Contra Costa	6,777	77.69%	1,946	22.31%	4,831	55.38%	8,723	-6.89%
Lafayette	Contra Costa	9,646	71.95%	3,760	28.05%	5,886	43.91%	13,406	-4.38%
Martinez	Contra Costa	11,089	66.75%	5,523	33.25%	5,566	33.51%	16,612	-6.17%
Moraga	Contra Costa	5,606	71.05%	2,284	28.95%	3,322	42.10%	7,890	-6.76%
Oakley	Contra Costa	6,408	53.03%	5,675	46.97%	733	6.07%	12,083	-4.38%
Orinda	Contra Costa	7,804	73.81%	2,769	26.19%	5,035	47.62%	10,573	-5.02%
Pinole	Contra Costa	4,989	73.94%	1,758	26.06%	3,231	47.89%	6,747	-6.59%
Pittsburg	Contra Costa	11,561	73.86%	4,092	26.14%	7,469	47.72%	15,653	-8.36%
Pleasant Hill	Contra Costa	10,297	70.83%	4,241	29.17%	6,056	41.66%	14,538	-4.45%
Richmond	Contra Costa	23,910	86.85%	3,621	13.15%	20,289	73.70%	27,531	-3.88%
San Pablo	Contra Costa	3,680	83.45%	730	16.55%	2,950	66.89%	4,410	-6.89%
San Ramon	Contra Costa	18,316	66.09%	9,396	33.91%	8,920	32.19%	27,712	-8.35%
Walnut Creek	Contra Costa	23,713	72.08%	9,186	27.92%	14,527	44.16%	32,899	-4.77%
Unincorporated Area	Contra Costa	39,670	63.31%	22,987	36.69%	16,683	26.63%	62,657	-5.97%
Crescent City	Del Norte	448	48.38%	478	51.62%	-30	-3.24%	926	-2.54%
Unincorporated Area	Del Norte	2,816	37.80%	4,633	62.20%	-1,817	-24.39%	7,449	-2.05%
Placerville	El Dorado	1,891	46.73%	2,156	53.27%	-265	-6.55%	4,047	-2.84%
South Lake Tahoe	El Dorado	3,636	62.14%	2,215	37.86%	1,421	24.29%	5,851	1.34%
Unincorporated Area	El Dorado	29,007	36.82%	49,766	63.18%	-20,759	-26.35%	78,773	-4.00%
Clovis	Fresno	13,704	35.47%	24,933	64.53%	-11,229	-29.06%	38,637	-5.98%
Coalinga	Fresno	1,037	39.96%	1,558	60.04%	-521	-20.08%	2,595	-2.71%
Firebaugh	Fresno	617	57.61%	454	42.39%	163	15.22%	1,071	-17.87%
Fowler	Fresno	936	47.80%	1,022	52.20%	-86	-4.39%	1,958	-12.39%
Fresno	Fresno	54,884	52.56%	49,540	47.44%	5,344	5.12%	104,424	-7.20%
Huron	Fresno	372	76.70%	113	23.30%	259	53.40%	485	-11.47%
Kerman	Fresno	1,358	50.31%	1,341	49.69%	17	0.63%	2,699	-10.14%
Kingsburg	Fresno	1,039	24.46%	3,208	75.54%	-2,169	-51.07%	4,247	-8.44%
Mendota	Fresno	614	66.24%	313	33.76%	301	32.47%	927	-24.07%
Orange Cove	Fresno	624	65.20%	333	34.80%	291	30.41%	957	-13.69%
Parlier	Fresno	1,196	71.92%	467	28.08%	729	43.84%	1,663	-11.29%
Reedley	Fresno	1,928	42.60%	2,598	57.40%	-670	-14.80%	4,526	-13.95%
San Joaquin	Fresno	212	77.66%	61	22.34%	151	55.31%	273	-11.63%
Sanger	Fresno	2,620	52.93%	2,330	47.07%	290	5.86%	4,950	-13.17%
Selma	Fresno	2,064	50.46%	2,026	49.54%	38	0.93%	4,090	-10.89%
Unincorporated Area	Fresno	15,212	33.37%	30,371	66.63%	-15,159	-33.26%	45,583	-6.78%
Orland	Glenn	627	34.17%	1,208	65.83%	-581	-31.66%	1,835	-9.39%
Willows	Glenn	459	27.72%	1,197	72.28%	-738	-44.57%	1,656	-5.76%
Unincorporated Area	Glenn	844	19.01%	3,595	80.99%	-2,751	-61.97%	4,439	-7.87%
Arcata	Humboldt	5,103	84.12%	963	15.88%	4,140	68.25%	6,066	-0.26%
Blue Lake	Humboldt	404	73.19%	148	26.81%	256	46.38%	552	-2.15%
Eureka	Humboldt	5,731	68.13%	2,681	31.87%	3,050	36.26%	8,412	-3.37%
Ferndale	Humboldt	364	47.52%	402	52.48%	-38	-4.96%	766	-12.71%
Fortuna	Humboldt	1,606	40.52%	2,357	59.48%	-751	-18.95%	3,963	-4.84%
Rio Dell	Humboldt	315	33.58%	623	66.42%	-308	-32.84%	938	-6.41%
Trinidad	Humboldt	151	77.04%	45	22.96%	106	54.08%	196	-4.47%
Unincorporated Area	Humboldt	15,867	58.97%	11,038	41.03%	4,829	17.95%	26,905	-5.10%
Brawley	Imperial	2,565	53.17%	2,259	46.83%	306	6.34%	4,824	-6.93%
Calexico	Imperial	4,458	75.44%	1,451	24.56%	3,007	50.89%	5,909	-6.20%
Calipatria	Imperial	304	55.68%	242	44.32%	62	11.36%	546	-13.69%
El Centro	Imperial	4,574	57.21%	3,421	42.79%	1,153	14.42%	7,995	-7.97%
Holtville	Imperial	606	52.06%	558	47.94%	48	4.12%	1,164	-0.47%
Imperial	Imperial	1,799	45.36%	2,167	54.64%	-368	-9.28%	3,966	-11.00%
Westmorland	Imperial	187	61.31%	118	38.69%	69	22.62%	305	-11.95%
Unincorporated Area	Imperial	2,218	42.98%	2,942	57.02%	-724	-14.03%	5,160	-10.07%
Bishop	Inyo	691	54.88%	568	45.12%	123	9.77%	1,259	1.70%
Unincorporated Area	Inyo	2,691	43.28%	3,527	56.72%	-836	-13.44%	6,218	-1.65%
Arvin	Kern	1,037	67.51%	499	32.49%	538	35.03%	1,536	-13.19%
Bakersfield	Kern	36,107	40.07%	54,008	59.93%	-17,901	-19.86%	90,115	-3.03%
California City	Kern	1,170	42.73%	1,568	57.27%	-398	-14.54%	2,738	-2.58%
Delano	Kern	3,576	64.47%	1,971	35.53%	1,605	28.93%	5,547	-11.08%
Maricopa	Kern	41	15.41%	225	84.59%	-184	-69.17%	266	2.94%
McFarland	Kern	843	58.70%	593	41.30%	250	17.41%	1,436	-19.98%
Ridgecrest	Kern	2,785	32.87%	5,689	67.13%	-2,904	-34.27%	8,474	-0.37%
Shafter	Kern	1,318	40.33%	1,950	59.67%	-632	-19.34%	3,268	-3.10%
Taft	Kern	213	13.03%	1,422	86.97%	-1,209	-73.94%	1,635	-3.47%
Tehachapi	Kern	847	30.33%	1,946	69.67%	-1,099	-39.35%	2,793	-1.92%
Wasco	Kern	1,274	49.55%	1,297	50.45%	-23	-0.89%	2,571	-11.58%
Unincorporated Area	Kern	20,495	29.99%	47,838	70.01%	-27,343	-40.01%	68,333	-1.50%
Avenal	Kings	419	62.17%	255	37.83%	164	24.33%	674	-3.36%
Corcoran	Kings	790	49.72%	799	50.28%	-9	-0.57%	1,589	-5.67%
Hanford	Kings	4,916	36.07%	8,712	63.93%	-3,796	-27.85%	13,628	-2.50%
Lemoore	Kings	1,872	34.28%	3,589	65.72%	-1,717	-31.44%	5,461	-3.71%
Unincorporated Area	Kings	1,392	25.04%	4,168	74.96%	-2,776	-49.93%	5,560	-3.16%
Clearlake	Lake	1,484	53.79%	1,275	46.21%	209	7.58%	2,759	-3.83%
Lakeport	Lake	882	49.55%	898	50.45%	-16	-0.90%	1,780	-7.43%
Unincorporated Area	Lake	7,405	47.49%	8,187	52.51%	-782	-5.02%	15,592	-4.73%
Susanville	Lassen	543	18.91%	2,329	81.09%	-1,786	-62.19%	2,872	2.43%
Unincorporated Area	Lassen	901	14.31%	5,397	85.69%	-4,496	-71.39%	6,298	-1.20%
Agoura Hills	Los Angeles	5,534	58.82%	3,874	41.18%	1,660	17.64%	9,408	-4.78%
Alhambra	Los Angeles	12,277	69.01%	5,514	30.99%	6,763	38.01%	17,791	-7.70%
Arcadia	Los Angeles	7,651	52.02%	7,058	47.98%	593	4.03%	14,709	-11.83%
Artesia	Los Angeles	1,990	58.07%	1,437	41.93%	553	16.14%	3,427	-11.03%
Avalon	Los Angeles	399	51.82%	371	48.18%	28	3.64%	770	-4.15%
Azusa	Los Angeles	5,428	60.47%	3,548	39.53%	1,880	20.94%	8,976	-10.16%
Baldwin Park	Los Angeles	7,420	70.00%	3,180	30.00%	4,240	40.00%	10,600	-11.50%
Bell	Los Angeles	2,525	75.78%	807	24.22%	1,718	51.56%	3,332	-14.34%
Bell Gardens	Los Angeles	3,086	78.44%	848	21.56%	2,238	56.89%	3,934	-8.96%
Bellflower	Los Angeles	8,310	61.58%	5,185	38.42%	3,125	23.16%	13,495	-11.59%
Beverly Hills	Los Angeles	6,383	52.98%	5,664	47.02%	719	5.97%	12,047	-2.61%
Bradbury	Los Angeles	128	41.03%	184	58.97%	-56	-17.95%	312	-3.29%
Burbank	Los Angeles	24,421	68.57%	11,193	31.43%	13,228	37.14%	35,614	-0.09%
Calabasas	Los Angeles	5,780	60.07%	3,842	39.93%	1,938	20.14%	9,622	-2.76%
Carson	Los Angeles	17,157	75.97%	5,426	24.03%	11,731	51.95%	22,583	-5.97%
Cerritos	Los Angeles	9,758	58.22%	7,004	41.78%	2,754	16.43%	16,762	-12.56%
Claremont	Los Angeles	9,218	65.71%	4,811	34.29%	4,407	31.41%	14,029	-5.04%
Commerce	Los Angeles	1,653	76.39%	511	23.61%	1,142	52.77%	2,164	-7.48%
Compton	Los Angeles	10,347	86.75%	1,580	13.25%	8,767	73.51%	11,927	-5.57%
Covina	Los Angeles	6,928	55.47%	5,562	44.53%	1,366	10.94%	12,490	-9.54%
Cudahy	Los Angeles	1,415	77.36%	414	22.64%	1,001	54.73%	1,829	-15.40%
Culver City	Los Angeles	13,940	81.03%	3,264	18.97%	10,676	62.06%	17,204	-3.78%
Diamond Bar	Los Angeles	7,903	52.46%	7,161	47.54%	742	4.93%	15,064	-12.79%
Downey	Los Angeles	14,268	60.27%	9,404	39.73%	4,864	20.55%	23,672	-14.07%
Duarte	Los Angeles	3,881	63.62%	2,219	36.38%	1,662	27.25%	6,100	-7.90%
El Monte	Los Angeles	8,091	67.21%	3,948	32.79%	4,143	34.41%	12,039	-11.60%
El Segundo	Los Angeles	4,398	59.29%	3,020	40.71%	1,378	18.58%	7,418	-3.84%
Gardena	Los Angeles	9,584	74.40%	3,298	25.60%	6,286	48.80%	12,882	-7.06%
Glendale	Los Angeles	31,253	65.05%	16,792	34.95%	14,461	30.10%	48,045	1.18%
Glendora	Los Angeles	7,780	42.62%	10,475	57.38%	-2,695	-14.76%	18,255	-7.73%
Hawaiian Gardens	Los Angeles	1,335	66.62%	669	33.38%	666	33.23%	2,004	-13.04%
Hawthorne	Los Angeles	10,939	75.61%	3,528	24.39%	7,411	51.23%	14,467	-7.93%
Hermosa Beach	Los Angeles	5,374	62.42%	3,236	37.58%	2,138	24.83%	8,610	-4.26%
Hidden Hills	Los Angeles	432	50.41%	425	49.59%	7	0.82%	857	-5.97%
Huntington Park	Los Angeles	4,196	78.50%	1,149	21.50%	3,047	57.01%	5,345	-11.82%
Industry	Los Angeles	72	60.50%	47	39.50%	25	21.01%	119	32.87%
Inglewood	Los Angeles	20,630	88.77%	2,609	11.23%	18,021	77.55%	23,239	-3.27%
Irwindale	Los Angeles	342	63.33%	198	36.67%	144	26.67%	540	-9.02%
La Canada Flintridge	Los Angeles	5,160	55.96%	4,061	44.04%	1,099	11.92%	9,221	-5.74%
La Habra Heights	Los Angeles	870	37.28%	1,464	62.72%	-594	-25.45%	2,334	-5.84%
La Mirada	Los Angeles	6,650	46.81%	7,555	53.19%	-905	-6.37%	14,205	-12.12%
La Puente	Los Angeles	4,019	69.09%	1,798	30.91%	2,221	38.18%	5,817	-12.17%
La Verne	Los Angeles	5,631	45.47%	6,752	54.53%	-1,121	-9.05%	12,383	-5.18%
Lakewood	Los Angeles	14,015	54.98%	11,477	45.02%	2,538	9.96%	25,492	-7.61%
Lancaster	Los Angeles	16,272	51.10%	15,572	48.90%	700	2.20%	31,844	-4.66%
Lawndale	Los Angeles	3,365	67.67%	1,608	32.33%	1,757	35.33%	4,973	-11.33%
Lomita	Los Angeles	2,996	53.23%	2,632	46.77%	364	6.47%	5,628	-7.51%
Long Beach	Los Angeles	79,185	69.01%	35,559	30.99%	43,626	38.02%	114,744	-4.74%
Los Angeles	Los Angeles	688,692	74.82%	231,770	25.18%	456,922	49.64%	920,462	-4.64%
Lynwood	Los Angeles	5,905	79.43%	1,529	20.57%	4,376	58.86%	7,434	-13.06%
Malibu	Los Angeles	3,016	60.81%	1,944	39.19%	1,072	21.61%	4,960	-1.74%
Manhattan Beach	Los Angeles	10,225	58.26%	7,326	41.74%	2,899	16.52%	17,551	-4.74%
Maywood	Los Angeles	2,044	78.98%	544	21.02%	1,500	57.96%	2,588	-13.18%
Monrovia	Los Angeles	7,386	62.10%	4,508	37.90%	2,878	24.20%	11,894	-5.80%
Montebello	Los Angeles	8,512	71.00%	3,477	29.00%	5,035	42.00%	11,989	-9.45%
Monterey Park	Los Angeles	8,136	66.55%	4,089	33.45%	4,047	33.10%	12,225	-9.70%
Norwalk	Los Angeles	11,826	64.07%	6,632	35.93%	5,194	28.14%	18,458	-13.57%
Palmdale	Los Angeles	16,462	55.87%	13,003	44.13%	3,459	11.74%	29,465	-9.17%
Palos Verdes Estates	Los Angeles	3,299	47.26%	3,681	52.74%	-382	-5.47%	6,980	-7.06%
Paramount	Los Angeles	4,517	75.03%	1,503	24.97%	3,014	50.07%	6,020	-9.85%
Pasadena	Los Angeles	35,945	75.38%	11,739	24.62%	24,206	50.76%	47,684	-2.56%
Pico Rivera	Los Angeles	9,100	70.99%	3,718	29.01%	5,382	41.99%	12,818	-12.00%
Pomona	Los Angeles	14,470	65.03%	7,781	34.97%	6,689	30.06%	22,251	-10.27%
Rancho Palos Verdes	Los Angeles	9,259	51.57%	8,694	48.43%	565	3.15%	17,953	-7.20%
Redondo Beach	Los Angeles	17,119	63.08%	10,020	36.92%	7,099	26.16%	27,139	-3.56%
Rolling Hills	Los Angeles	330	32.87%	674	67.13%	-344	-34.26%	1,004	-8.95%
Rolling Hills Estates	Los Angeles	1,910	48.24%	2,049	51.76%	-139	-3.51%	3,959	-5.92%
Rosemead	Los Angeles	4,609	66.36%	2,336	33.64%	2,273	32.73%	6,945	-10.01%
San Dimas	Los Angeles	5,224	43.97%	6,656	56.03%	-1,432	-12.05%	11,880	-8.68%
San Fernando	Los Angeles	2,869	72.09%	1,111	27.91%	1,758	44.17%	3,980	-11.48%
San Gabriel	Los Angeles	4,750	62.02%	2,909	37.98%	1,841	24.04%	7,659	-11.24%
San Marino	Los Angeles	2,472	50.72%	2,402	49.28%	70	1.44%	4,874	-11.94%
Santa Clarita	Los Angeles	37,226	47.91%	40,471	52.09%	-3,245	-4.18%	77,697	-5.70%
Santa Fe Springs	Los Angeles	2,803	63.43%	1,616	36.57%	1,187	26.86%	4,419	-9.89%
Santa Monica	Los Angeles	30,297	79.12%	7,997	20.88%	22,300	58.23%	38,294	-2.38%
Sierra Madre	Los Angeles	3,520	63.25%	2,045	36.75%	1,475	26.50%	5,565	-2.73%
Signal Hill	Los Angeles	2,269	70.82%	935	29.18%	1,334	41.64%	3,204	-6.17%
South El Monte	Los Angeles	1,847	69.94%	794	30.06%	1,053	39.87%	2,641	-13.91%
South Gate	Los Angeles	8,603	75.32%	2,819	24.68%	5,784	50.64%	11,422	-13.39%
South Pasadena	Los Angeles	8,422	77.87%	2,394	22.13%	6,028	55.73%	10,816	-2.99%
Temple City	Los Angeles	4,510	53.94%	3,851	46.06%	659	7.88%	8,361	-11.72%
Torrance	Los Angeles	26,948	55.57%	21,544	44.43%	5,404	11.14%	48,492	-7.41%
Vernon	Los Angeles	36	75.00%	12	25.00%	24	50.00%	48	2.94%
Walnut	Los Angeles	4,756	55.48%	3,817	44.52%	939	10.95%	8,573	-12.97%
West Covina	Los Angeles	14,158	59.53%	9,623	40.47%	4,535	19.07%	23,781	-11.92%
West Hollywood	Los Angeles	12,745	84.09%	2,411	15.91%	10,334	68.18%	15,156	1.39%
Westlake Village	Los Angeles	2,181	52.35%	1,985	47.65%	196	4.70%	4,166	-4.62%
Whittier	Los Angeles	13,662	56.07%	10,702	43.93%	2,960	12.15%	24,364	-9.31%
Unincorporated Area	Los Angeles	137,604	63.78%	78,130	36.22%	59,474	27.57%	215,734	-8.33%
Chowchilla	Madera	920	32.88%	1,878	67.12%	-958	-34.24%	2,798	-2.23%
Madera	Madera	4,662	49.49%	4,759	50.51%	-97	-1.03%	9,421	-8.96%
Unincorporated Area	Madera	7,701	31.13%	17,041	68.87%	-9,340	-37.75%	24,742	-4.50%
Belvedere	Marin	846	66.56%	425	33.44%	421	33.12%	1,271	-8.74%
Corte Madera	Marin	4,108	82.47%	873	17.53%	3,235	64.95%	4,981	-3.81%
Fairfax	Marin	3,772	89.55%	440	10.45%	3,332	79.11%	4,212	-0.91%
Larkspur	Marin	5,292	81.91%	1,169	18.09%	4,123	63.81%	6,461	-2.90%
Mill Valley	Marin	6,704	87.42%	965	12.58%	5,739	74.83%	7,669	-1.85%
Novato	Marin	15,723	72.03%	6,104	27.97%	9,619	44.07%	21,827	-5.67%
Ross	Marin	892	72.46%	339	27.54%	553	44.92%	1,231	-6.69%
San Anselmo	Marin	6,012	85.65%	1,007	14.35%	5,005	71.31%	7,019	-4.04%
San Rafael	Marin	17,886	81.27%	4,121	18.73%	13,765	62.55%	22,007	-2.58%
Sausalito	Marin	3,357	82.22%	726	17.78%	2,631	64.44%	4,083	-2.33%
Tiburon	Marin	3,482	75.08%	1,156	24.92%	2,326	50.15%	4,638	-3.90%
Unincorporated Area	Marin	27,215	80.84%	6,450	19.16%	20,765	61.68%	33,665	-3.06%
Unincorporated Area	Mariposa	2,944	37.55%	4,896	62.45%	-1,952	-24.90%	7,840	-2.03%
Fort Bragg	Mendocino	1,557	69.73%	676	30.27%	881	39.45%	2,233	-3.84%
Point Arena	Mendocino	114	85.71%	19	14.29%	95	71.43%	133	3.33%
Ukiah	Mendocino	2,762	61.35%	1,740	38.65%	1,022	22.70%	4,502	-4.41%
Willits	Mendocino	821	58.60%	580	41.40%	241	17.20%	1,401	-3.47%
Unincorporated Area	Mendocino	13,777	62.27%	8,348	37.73%	5,429	24.54%	22,125	-4.12%
Atwater	Merced	2,818	42.89%	3,752	57.11%	-934	-14.22%	6,570	-5.04%
Dos Palos	Merced	474	46.15%	553	53.85%	-79	-7.69%	1,027	2.99%
Gustine	Merced	570	42.16%	782	57.84%	-212	-15.68%	1,352	-3.60%
Livingston	Merced	1,445	60.74%	934	39.26%	511	21.48%	2,379	-20.45%
Los Banos	Merced	4,205	53.07%	3,719	46.93%	486	6.13%	7,924	-4.23%
Merced	Merced	9,282	53.93%	7,930	46.07%	1,352	7.85%	17,212	-4.38%
Unincorporated Area	Merced	6,406	34.06%	12,403	65.94%	-5,997	-31.88%	18,809	-4.82%
Alturas	Modoc	206	23.20%	682	76.80%	-476	-53.60%	888	-3.77%
Unincorporated Area	Modoc	481	19.06%	2,043	80.94%	-1,562	-61.89%	2,524	-3.54%
Mammoth Lakes	Mono	1,379	63.23%	802	36.77%	577	26.46%	2,181	-3.12%
Unincorporated Area	Mono	1,114	46.65%	1,274	53.35%	-160	-6.70%	2,388	-0.58%
Carmel-by-the-Sea	Monterey	1,248	64.80%	678	35.20%	570	29.60%	1,926	-7.40%
Del Rey Oaks	Monterey	585	65.07%	314	34.93%	271	30.14%	899	-3.34%
Gonzales	Monterey	861	63.97%	485	36.03%	376	27.93%	1,346	-12.16%
Greenfield	Monterey	1,451	71.73%	572	28.27%	879	43.45%	2,023	-10.82%
King City	Monterey	694	54.73%	574	45.27%	120	9.46%	1,268	-12.58%
Marina	Monterey	4,093	67.00%	2,016	33.00%	2,077	34.00%	6,109	-7.26%
Monterey	Monterey	7,072	70.64%	2,939	29.36%	4,133	41.28%	10,011	-3.65%
Pacific Grove	Monterey	5,445	75.08%	1,807	24.92%	3,638	50.17%	7,252	-2.95%
Salinas	Monterey	15,967	65.29%	8,490	34.71%	7,477	30.57%	24,457	-12.23%
Sand City	Monterey	86	64.66%	47	35.34%	39	29.32%	133	-4.93%
Seaside	Monterey	4,869	71.15%	1,974	28.85%	2,895	42.31%	6,843	-3.41%
Soledad	Monterey	1,890	69.13%	844	30.87%	1,046	38.26%	2,734	-11.14%
Unincorporated Area	Monterey	21,001	56.56%	16,127	43.44%	4,874	13.13%	37,128	-7.29%
American Canyon	Napa	4,141	68.06%	1,943	31.94%	2,198	36.13%	6,084	-9.01%
Calistoga	Napa	1,230	72.82%	459	27.18%	771	45.65%	1,689	-1.59%
Napa	Napa	18,943	66.43%	9,572	33.57%	9,371	32.86%	28,515	-4.32%
St. Helena	Napa	1,702	70.07%	727	29.93%	975	40.14%	2,429	-7.52%
Yountville	Napa	851	67.70%	406	32.30%	445	35.40%	1,257	-5.03%
Unincorporated Area	Napa	5,570	54.96%	4,564	45.04%	1,006	9.93%	10,134	-7.17%
Grass Valley	Nevada	3,028	57.19%	2,267	42.81%	761	14.37%	5,295	-2.76%
Nevada City	Nevada	1,315	75.06%	437	24.94%	878	50.11%	1,752	-0.05%
Truckee	Nevada	5,235	71.09%	2,129	28.91%	3,106	42.18%	7,364	-2.33%
Unincorporated Area	Nevada	17,077	47.01%	19,249	52.99%	-2,172	-5.98%	36,326	-3.52%
Aliso Viejo	Orange	9,162	51.44%	8,648	48.56%	514	2.89%	17,810	-3.76%
Anaheim	Orange	37,688	53.30%	33,016	46.70%	4,672	6.61%	70,704	-8.65%
Brea	Orange	7,219	44.35%	9,057	55.65%	-1,838	-11.29%	16,276	-7.75%
Buena Park	Orange	9,853	52.14%	9,043	47.86%	810	4.29%	18,896	-10.51%
Costa Mesa	Orange	16,948	50.64%	16,518	49.36%	430	1.28%	33,466	-2.83%
Cypress	Orange	7,975	48.17%	8,581	51.83%	-606	-3.66%	16,556	-7.46%
Dana Point	Orange	6,619	43.20%	8,703	56.80%	-2,084	-13.60%	15,322	-1.02%
Fountain Valley	Orange	9,598	45.47%	11,510	54.53%	-1,912	-9.06%	21,108	-5.42%
Fullerton	Orange	19,680	51.43%	18,585	48.57%	1,095	2.86%	38,265	-8.79%
Garden Grove	Orange	19,329	49.67%	19,584	50.33%	-255	-0.66%	38,913	-9.37%
Huntington Beach	Orange	33,780	42.34%	46,002	57.66%	-12,222	-15.32%	79,782	-4.43%
Irvine	Orange	49,582	61.03%	31,666	38.97%	17,916	22.05%	81,248	-5.20%
La Habra	Orange	7,563	50.08%	7,538	49.92%	25	0.17%	15,101	-9.52%
La Palma	Orange	2,654	51.65%	2,484	48.35%	170	3.31%	5,138	-9.43%
Laguna Beach	Orange	7,270	59.36%	4,977	40.64%	2,293	18.72%	12,247	-1.95%
Laguna Hills	Orange	5,575	47.08%	6,267	52.92%	-692	-5.84%	11,842	-3.88%
Laguna Niguel	Orange	13,129	46.73%	14,969	53.27%	-1,840	-6.55%	28,098	-3.06%
Laguna Woods	Orange	6,125	55.52%	4,907	44.48%	1,218	11.04%	11,032	-4.78%
Lake Forest	Orange	14,393	48.20%	15,471	51.80%	-1,078	-3.61%	29,864	-4.52%
Los Alamitos	Orange	1,862	47.09%	2,092	52.91%	-230	-5.82%	3,954	-5.21%
Mission Viejo	Orange	17,984	45.07%	21,916	54.93%	-3,932	-9.85%	39,900	-5.00%
Newport Beach	Orange	14,343	37.51%	23,897	62.49%	-9,554	-24.98%	38,240	-2.54%
Orange	Orange	19,726	46.75%	22,467	53.25%	-2,741	-6.50%	42,193	-6.46%
Placentia	Orange	7,566	45.38%	9,106	54.62%	-1,540	-9.24%	16,672	-8.30%
Rancho Santa Margarita	Orange	7,886	43.19%	10,371	56.81%	-2,485	-13.61%	18,257	-4.53%
San Clemente	Orange	11,160	39.22%	17,297	60.78%	-6,137	-21.57%	28,457	-1.30%
San Juan Capistrano	Orange	5,614	41.46%	7,926	58.54%	-2,312	-17.08%	13,540	-3.60%
Santa Ana	Orange	28,632	63.88%	16,188	36.12%	12,444	27.76%	44,820	-11.11%
Seal Beach	Orange	6,524	49.03%	6,781	50.97%	-257	-1.93%	13,305	-3.93%
Stanton	Orange	3,642	54.40%	3,053	45.60%	589	8.80%	6,695	-9.96%
Tustin	Orange	11,463	55.68%	9,124	44.32%	2,339	11.36%	20,587	-7.74%
Villa Park	Orange	956	30.69%	2,159	69.31%	-1,203	-38.62%	3,115	-7.18%
Westminster	Orange	11,278	46.26%	13,100	53.74%	-1,822	-7.47%	24,378	-9.92%
Yorba Linda	Orange	9,989	33.86%	19,511	66.14%	-9,522	-32.28%	29,500	-7.13%
Unincorporated Area	Orange	21,439	41.50%	30,220	58.50%	-8,781	-17.00%	51,659	-4.50%
Auburn	Placer	3,242	46.71%	3,698	53.29%	-456	-6.57%	6,940	-3.51%
Colfax	Placer	246	35.70%	443	64.30%	-197	-28.59%	689	-7.06%
Lincoln	Placer	9,789	40.23%	14,545	59.77%	-4,756	-19.54%	24,334	-3.36%
Loomis	Placer	957	28.65%	2,383	71.35%	-1,426	-42.69%	3,340	-5.92%
Rocklin	Placer	12,178	41.21%	17,372	58.79%	-5,194	-17.58%	29,550	-3.71%
Roseville	Placer	26,352	43.32%	34,482	56.68%	-8,130	-13.36%	60,834	-4.80%
Unincorporated Area	Placer	20,855	36.99%	35,527	63.01%	-14,672	-26.02%	56,382	-4.48%
Portola	Plumas	266	38.66%	422	61.34%	-156	-22.67%	688	-4.75%
Unincorporated Area	Plumas	2,817	35.46%	5,128	64.54%	-2,311	-29.09%	7,945	-2.05%
Banning	Riverside	3,873	45.98%	4,550	54.02%	-677	-8.04%	8,423	-4.38%
Beaumont	Riverside	6,766	44.76%	8,349	55.24%	-1,583	-10.47%	15,115	-1.79%
Blythe	Riverside	896	40.89%	1,295	59.11%	-399	-18.21%	2,191	1.42%
Calimesa	Riverside	1,285	32.18%	2,708	67.82%	-1,423	-35.64%	3,993	-1.21%
Canyon Lake	Riverside	1,038	20.66%	3,986	79.34%	-2,948	-58.68%	5,024	0.25%
Cathedral City	Riverside	9,297	70.23%	3,940	29.77%	5,357	40.47%	13,237	-3.48%
Coachella	Riverside	3,678	76.75%	1,114	23.25%	2,564	53.51%	4,792	-5.52%
Corona	Riverside	17,992	44.98%	22,007	55.02%	-4,015	-10.04%	39,999	-4.80%
Desert Hot Springs	Riverside	3,008	61.55%	1,879	38.45%	1,129	23.10%	4,887	-0.96%
Eastvale	Riverside	7,721	47.17%	8,649	52.83%	-928	-5.67%	16,370	-5.84%
Hemet	Riverside	9,131	45.51%	10,931	54.49%	-1,800	-8.97%	20,062	-4.12%
Indian Wells	Riverside	912	36.47%	1,589	63.53%	-677	-27.07%	2,501	-7.22%
Indio	Riverside	11,028	55.03%	9,011	44.97%	2,017	10.07%	20,039	-6.10%
Jurupa Valley	Riverside	9,153	49.16%	9,465	50.84%	-312	-1.68%	18,618	-6.79%
La Quinta	Riverside	7,201	46.42%	8,313	53.58%	-1,112	-7.17%	15,514	-4.30%
Lake Elsinore	Riverside	6,509	44.55%	8,102	55.45%	-1,593	-10.90%	14,611	-1.55%
Indio	Riverside	13,484	40.72%	19,633	59.28%	-6,149	-18.57%	33,117	0.27%
Moreno Valley	Riverside	20,442	61.07%	13,030	38.93%	7,412	22.14%	33,472	-6.56%
Murrieta	Riverside	12,398	37.14%	20,982	62.86%	-8,584	-25.72%	33,380	-1.59%
Norco	Riverside	2,014	24.75%	6,122	75.25%	-4,108	-50.49%	8,136	-2.55%
Palm Desert	Riverside	10,547	51.84%	9,799	48.16%	748	3.68%	20,346	-3.30%
Palm Springs	Riverside	16,238	80.78%	3,863	19.22%	12,375	61.56%	20,101	1.83%
Perris	Riverside	5,755	64.98%	3,101	35.02%	2,654	29.97%	8,856	-6.92%
Rancho Mirage	Riverside	5,933	60.47%	3,878	39.53%	2,055	20.95%	9,811	0.29%
Riverside	Riverside	34,601	51.75%	32,267	48.25%	2,334	3.49%	66,868	-5.35%
San Jacinto	Riverside	3,999	47.62%	4,399	52.38%	-400	-4.76%	8,398	-7.08%
Temecula	Riverside	14,040	40.31%	20,789	59.69%	-6,749	-19.38%	34,829	-1.20%
Temecula	Riverside	3,365	33.35%	6,726	66.65%	-3,361	-33.31%	10,091	-2.12%
Unincorporated Area	Riverside	42,696	41.40%	60,424	58.60%	-17,728	-17.19%	103,120	-2.99%
Citrus Heights	Sacramento	12,457	43.31%	16,308	56.69%	-3,851	-13.39%	28,765	-2.42%
Elk Grove	Sacramento	33,494	57.65%	24,607	42.35%	8,887	15.30%	58,101	-7.60%
Folsom	Sacramento	15,647	47.68%	17,169	52.32%	-1,522	-4.64%	32,816	-4.48%
Galt	Sacramento	2,819	37.09%	4,782	62.91%	-1,963	-25.83%	7,601	-6.95%
Isleton	Sacramento	106	52.22%	97	47.78%	9	4.43%	203	-4.43%
Rancho Cordova	Sacramento	12,098	54.00%	10,304	46.00%	1,794	8.01%	22,402	-2.20%
Sacramento	Sacramento	104,806	72.66%	39,439	27.34%	65,367	45.32%	144,245	-4.81%
Unincorporated Area	Sacramento	93,253	50.82%	90,227	49.18%	3,026	1.65%	183,480	-4.23%
Hollister	San Benito	6,347	58.86%	4,436	41.14%	1,911	17.72%	10,783	-10.25%
San Juan Bautista	San Benito	524	64.14%	293	35.86%	231	28.27%	817	-8.53%
Unincorporated Area	San Benito	3,557	44.59%	4,421	55.41%	-864	-10.83%	7,978	-7.86%
Adelanto	San Bernardino	2,150	58.54%	1,523	41.46%	627	17.07%	3,673	-6.00%
Apple Valley	San Bernardino	6,849	33.12%	13,832	66.88%	-6,983	-33.77%	20,681	-1.46%
Barstow	San Bernardino	1,610	43.62%	2,081	56.38%	-471	-12.76%	3,691	-2.27%
Big Bear Lake	San Bernardino	759	37.39%	1,271	62.61%	-512	-25.22%	2,030	-0.40%
Chino	San Bernardino	9,569	45.73%	11,358	54.27%	-1,789	-8.55%	20,927	-9.07%
Chino Hills	San Bernardino	10,915	45.12%	13,276	54.88%	-2,361	-9.76%	24,191	-8.45%
Colton	San Bernardino	5,093	63.61%	2,913	36.39%	2,180	27.23%	8,006	-3.85%
Fontana	San Bernardino	21,346	58.15%	15,362	41.85%	5,984	16.30%	36,708	-8.69%
Grand Terrace	San Bernardino	1,772	46.27%	2,058	53.73%	-286	-7.47%	3,830	-4.59%
Hesperia	San Bernardino	6,293	36.24%	11,072	63.76%	-4,779	-27.52%	17,365	-2.86%
Highland	San Bernardino	5,453	47.11%	6,122	52.89%	-669	-5.78%	11,575	-5.64%
Loma Linda	San Bernardino	3,030	53.83%	2,599	46.17%	431	7.66%	5,629	-1.77%
Montclair	San Bernardino	3,676	60.98%	2,352	39.02%	1,324	21.96%	6,028	-10.43%
Needles	San Bernardino	406	37.59%	674	62.41%	-268	-24.81%	1,080	-4.59%
Ontario	San Bernardino	17,575	55.85%	13,891	44.15%	3,684	11.71%	31,466	-8.68%
Rancho Cucamonga	San Bernardino	22,850	45.23%	27,666	54.77%	-4,816	-9.53%	50,516	-5.31%
Redlands	San Bernardino	12,063	49.85%	12,134	50.15%	-71	-0.29%	24,197	-2.55%
Rialto	San Bernardino	9,962	63.48%	5,730	36.52%	4,232	26.97%	15,692	-8.47%
San Bernardino	San Bernardino	17,053	59.76%	11,482	40.24%	5,571	19.52%	28,535	-5.04%
Twentynine Palms	San Bernardino	1,472	45.81%	1,741	54.19%	-269	-8.37%	3,213	1.43%
Upland	San Bernardino	11,045	46.47%	12,722	53.53%	-1,677	-7.06%	23,767	-7.78%
Victorville	San Bernardino	10,094	52.58%	9,102	47.42%	992	5.17%	19,196	-3.47%
Yucaipa	San Bernardino	5,352	29.89%	12,552	70.11%	-7,200	-40.21%	17,904	-2.18%
Yucca Valley	San Bernardino	2,540	39.71%	3,856	60.29%	-1,316	-20.58%	6,396	1.35%
Unincorporated Area	San Bernardino	26,464	38.80%	41,740	61.20%	-15,276	-22.40%	68,204	-2.32%
Carlsbad	San Diego	29,637	53.56%	25,693	46.44%	3,944	7.13%	55,330	-1.17%
Chula Vista	San Diego	40,157	59.17%	27,712	40.83%	12,445	18.34%	67,869	-6.48%
Coronado	San Diego	3,528	46.89%	3,996	53.11%	-468	-6.22%	7,524	-3.72%
Del Mar	San Diego	1,365	58.79%	957	41.21%	408	17.57%	2,322	-3.31%
El Cajon	San Diego	9,728	43.95%	12,408	56.05%	-2,680	-12.11%	22,136	-4.37%
Encinitas	San Diego	19,286	61.49%	12,077	38.51%	7,209	22.99%	31,363	-2.50%
Escondido	San Diego	18,433	48.61%	19,491	51.39%	-1,058	-2.79%	37,924	-4.55%
Imperial Beach	San Diego	3,143	52.18%	2,880	47.82%	263	4.37%	6,023	-2.47%
La Mesa	San Diego	12,881	59.55%	8,750	40.45%	4,131	19.10%	21,631	-0.99%
Lemon Grove	San Diego	4,160	59.46%	2,836	40.54%	1,324	18.93%	6,996	-4.06%
National City	San Diego	6,305	66.83%	3,130	33.17%	3,175	33.65%	9,435	-2.65%
Oceanside	San Diego	32,030	52.96%	28,449	47.04%	3,581	5.92%	60,479	0.75%
Poway	San Diego	9,721	46.75%	11,072	53.25%	-1,351	-6.50%	20,793	-4.43%
San Diego	San Diego	274,259	65.14%	146,748	34.86%	127,511	30.29%	421,007	-2.63%
San Marcos	San Diego	15,038	51.97%	13,897	48.03%	1,141	3.94%	28,935	-3.32%
Santee	San Diego	8,529	39.60%	13,007	60.40%	-4,478	-20.79%	21,536	-1.93%
Solana Beach	San Diego	4,089	60.85%	2,631	39.15%	1,458	21.70%	6,720	-1.09%
Vista	San Diego	14,081	52.73%	12,621	47.27%	1,460	5.47%	26,702	-0.62%
Unincorporated Area	San Diego	67,751	38.83%	106,752	61.17%	-39,001	-22.35%	174,503	-2.49%
San Francisco	San Francisco	257,402	85.38%	44,064	14.62%	213,338	70.77%	301,466	-1.46%
Escalon	San Joaquin	701	26.16%	1,979	73.84%	-1,278	-47.69%	2,680	-9.93%
Lathrop	San Joaquin	3,715	58.68%	2,616	41.32%	1,099	17.36%	6,331	-9.88%
Lodi	San Joaquin	7,094	36.88%	12,143	63.12%	-5,049	-26.25%	19,237	-6.92%
Manteca	San Joaquin	10,613	46.84%	12,046	53.16%	-1,433	-6.32%	22,659	-6.24%
Ripon	San Joaquin	1,663	25.86%	4,768	74.14%	-3,105	-48.28%	6,431	-7.28%
Stockton	San Joaquin	34,193	59.77%	23,012	40.23%	11,181	19.55%	57,205	-9.88%
Tracy	San Joaquin	12,794	56.01%	10,047	43.99%	2,747	12.03%	22,841	-8.45%
Unincorporated Area	San Joaquin	14,725	36.87%	25,216	63.13%	-10,491	-26.27%	39,941	-8.10%
Arroyo Grande	San Luis Obispo	4,582	50.64%	4,466	49.36%	116	1.28%	9,048	-5.99%
Atascadero	San Luis Obispo	6,052	45.51%	7,246	54.49%	-1,194	-8.98%	13,298	-2.58%
El Paso de Robles	San Luis Obispo	4,724	42.39%	6,419	57.61%	-1,695	-15.21%	11,143	-2.81%
Grover Beach	San Luis Obispo	2,408	51.30%	2,286	48.70%	122	2.60%	4,694	-4.16%
Morro Bay	San Luis Obispo	3,435	59.06%	2,381	40.94%	1,054	18.12%	5,816	-4.70%
Pismo Beach	San Luis Obispo	2,207	48.73%	2,322	51.27%	-115	-2.54%	4,529	-3.78%
San Luis Obispo	San Luis Obispo	13,187	71.66%	5,214	28.34%	7,973	43.33%	18,401	-4.17%
Unincorporated Area	San Luis Obispo	24,571	46.62%	28,130	53.38%	-3,559	-6.75%	52,701	-2.68%
Atherton	San Mateo	1,968	62.48%	1,182	37.52%	786	24.95%	3,150	-8.76%
Belmont	San Mateo	8,310	76.91%	2,495	23.09%	5,815	53.82%	10,805	-4.39%
Brisbane	San Mateo	1,408	78.62%	383	21.38%	1,025	57.23%	1,791	-1.02%
Burlingame	San Mateo	8,568	73.98%	3,014	26.02%	5,554	47.95%	11,582	-5.38%
Colma	San Mateo	318	77.37%	93	22.63%	225	54.74%	411	-5.92%
Daly City	San Mateo	17,605	76.53%	5,398	23.47%	12,207	53.07%	23,003	-6.86%
East Palo Alto	San Mateo	3,412	85.02%	601	14.98%	2,811	70.05%	4,013	-7.04%
Foster City	San Mateo	7,905	72.82%	2,950	27.18%	4,955	45.65%	10,855	-6.96%
Half Moon Bay	San Mateo	3,792	74.08%	1,327	25.92%	2,465	48.15%	5,119	-2.76%
Hillsborough	San Mateo	3,020	60.16%	2,000	39.84%	1,020	20.32%	5,020	-8.25%
Menlo Park	San Mateo	10,408	80.43%	2,532	19.57%	7,876	60.87%	12,940	-5.39%
Millbrae	San Mateo	5,115	66.64%	2,560	33.36%	2,555	33.29%	7,675	-8.86%
Pacifica	San Mateo	12,165	74.24%	4,220	25.76%	7,945	48.49%	16,385	-5.12%
Portola Valley	San Mateo	1,970	73.40%	714	26.60%	1,256	46.80%	2,684	-9.06%
Redwood City	San Mateo	19,796	77.36%	5,792	22.64%	14,004	54.73%	25,588	-6.06%
San Bruno	San Mateo	9,327	71.52%	3,715	28.48%	5,612	43.03%	13,042	-7.27%
San Carlos	San Mateo	10,984	76.66%	3,344	23.34%	7,640	53.32%	14,328	-4.13%
San Mateo	San Mateo	25,560	75.35%	8,363	24.65%	17,197	50.69%	33,923	-5.67%
South San Francisco	San Mateo	13,536	74.73%	4,577	25.27%	8,959	49.46%	18,113	-7.60%
Woodside	San Mateo	1,922	66.41%	972	33.59%	950	32.83%	2,894	-5.35%
Unincorporated Area	San Mateo	18,510	76.50%	5,686	23.50%	12,824	53.00%	24,196	-3.74%
Buellton	Santa Barbara	1,098	49.26%	1,131	50.74%	-33	-1.48%	2,229	-3.17%
Carpinteria	Santa Barbara	3,473	66.97%	1,713	33.03%	1,760	33.94%	5,186	-4.07%
Goleta	Santa Barbara	8,548	67.86%	4,048	32.14%	4,500	35.73%	12,596	-4.02%
Guadalupe	Santa Barbara	783	61.22%	496	38.78%	287	22.44%	1,279	-5.09%
Lompoc	Santa Barbara	4,512	48.76%	4,741	51.24%	-229	-2.47%	9,253	-6.80%
Santa Barbara	Santa Barbara	25,039	75.31%	8,210	24.69%	16,829	50.62%	33,249	-3.70%
Santa Maria	Santa Barbara	7,854	48.26%	8,420	51.74%	-566	-3.48%	16,274	-9.87%
Solvang	Santa Barbara	1,312	48.50%	1,393	51.50%	-81	-2.99%	2,705	-4.13%
Unincorporated Area	Santa Barbara	28,029	53.28%	24,574	46.72%	3,455	6.57%	52,603	-2.77%
Campbell	Santa Clara	10,589	70.82%	4,364	29.18%	6,225	41.63%	14,953	-5.21%
Cupertino	Santa Clara	13,620	70.62%	5,666	29.38%	7,954	41.24%	19,286	-8.63%
Gilroy	Santa Clara	9,482	61.76%	5,870	38.24%	3,612	23.53%	15,352	-8.78%
Los Altos	Santa Clara	11,130	74.45%	3,819	25.55%	7,311	48.91%	14,949	-8.53%
Los Altos Hills	Santa Clara	2,772	66.19%	1,416	33.81%	1,356	32.38%	4,188	-7.81%
Los Gatos	Santa Clara	9,775	68.05%	4,589	31.95%	5,186	36.10%	14,364	-5.72%
Milpitas	Santa Clara	11,761	66.95%	5,805	33.05%	5,956	33.91%	17,566	-9.48%
Monte Sereno	Santa Clara	1,095	60.87%	704	39.13%	391	21.73%	1,799	-7.23%
Morgan Hill	Santa Clara	9,812	59.64%	6,640	40.36%	3,172	19.28%	16,452	-8.12%
Mountain View	Santa Clara	19,431	80.26%	4,780	19.74%	14,651	60.51%	24,211	-4.85%
Palo Alto	Santa Clara	21,969	80.94%	5,172	19.06%	16,797	61.89%	27,141	-4.95%
San Jose	Santa Clara	180,592	69.02%	81,078	30.98%	99,514	38.03%	261,670	-8.21%
Santa Clara	Santa Clara	22,210	71.99%	8,640	28.01%	13,570	43.99%	30,850	-6.66%
Saratoga	Santa Clara	9,312	65.17%	4,976	34.83%	4,336	30.35%	14,288	-11.69%
Sunnyvale	Santa Clara	28,689	74.98%	9,572	25.02%	19,117	49.96%	38,261	-5.47%
Unincorporated Area	Santa Clara	17,138	64.51%	9,427	35.49%	7,711	29.03%	26,565	-5.93%
Capitola	Santa Cruz	3,402	75.45%	1,107	24.55%	2,295	50.90%	4,509	-3.11%
Santa Cruz	Santa Cruz	21,066	85.97%	3,438	14.03%	17,628	71.94%	24,504	-1.50%
Scotts Valley	Santa Cruz	3,984	67.09%	1,954	32.91%	2,030	34.19%	5,938	-4.72%
Watsonville	Santa Cruz	6,614	74.54%	2,259	25.46%	4,355	49.08%	8,873	-11.26%
Unincorporated Area	Santa Cruz	44,051	73.00%	16,294	27.00%	27,757	46.00%	60,345	-4.69%
Anderson	Shasta	823	25.60%	2,392	74.40%	-1,569	-48.80%	3,215	-5.13%
Redding	Shasta	10,293	30.98%	22,935	69.02%	-12,642	-38.05%	33,228	-6.70%
Shasta Lake	Shasta	1,009	29.76%	2,381	70.24%	-1,372	-40.47%	3,390	-5.45%
Unincorporated Area	Shasta	6,482	22.60%	22,205	77.40%	-15,723	-54.81%	28,687	-6.60%
Loyalton	Sierra	86	27.83%	223	72.17%	-137	-44.34%	309	-6.65%
Unincorporated Area	Sierra	443	35.90%	791	64.10%	-348	-28.20%	1,234	-4.08%
Dorris	Siskiyou	43	23.50%	140	76.50%	-97	-53.01%	183	-9.05%
Dunsmuir	Siskiyou	290	55.03%	237	44.97%	53	10.06%	527	-4.85%
Etna	Siskiyou	88	31.10%	195	68.90%	-107	-37.81%	283	-4.72%
Fort Jones	Siskiyou	65	26.42%	181	73.58%	-116	-47.15%	246	-4.84%
Montague	Siskiyou	112	22.86%	378	77.14%	-266	-54.29%	490	-4.09%
Mt. Shasta	Siskiyou	872	58.25%	625	41.75%	247	16.50%	1,497	-1.34%
Tulelake	Siskiyou	27	23.28%	89	76.72%	-62	-53.45%	116	-6.68%
Weed	Siskiyou	266	41.69%	372	58.31%	-106	-16.61%	638	-8.23%
Yreka	Siskiyou	840	32.56%	1,740	67.44%	-900	-34.88%	2,580	-2.18%
Unincorporated Area	Siskiyou	3,723	33.35%	7,440	66.65%	-3,717	-33.30%	11,163	-5.23%
Benicia	Solano	8,600	66.03%	4,424	33.97%	4,176	32.06%	13,024	-6.14%
Dixon	Solano	2,788	44.52%	3,475	55.48%	-687	-10.97%	6,263	-4.20%
Fairfield	Solano	18,055	61.19%	11,451	38.81%	6,604	22.38%	29,506	-6.79%
Rio Vista	Solano	3,062	57.70%	2,245	42.30%	817	15.39%	5,307	-3.25%
Suisun City	Solano	4,572	64.89%	2,474	35.11%	2,098	29.78%	7,046	-5.40%
Vacaville	Solano	14,278	46.37%	16,513	53.63%	-2,235	-7.26%	30,791	-4.98%
Vallejo	Solano	23,673	75.17%	7,820	24.83%	15,853	50.34%	31,493	-6.08%
Unincorporated Area	Solano	2,741	38.13%	4,448	61.87%	-1,707	-23.74%	7,189	-6.94%
Cloverdale	Sonoma	2,234	62.37%	1,348	37.63%	886	24.73%	3,582	-6.58%
Cotati	Sonoma	2,238	70.24%	948	29.76%	1,290	40.49%	3,186	-6.28%
Healdsburg	Sonoma	3,807	74.73%	1,287	25.27%	2,520	49.47%	5,094	-4.58%
Petaluma	Sonoma	19,516	72.76%	7,307	27.24%	12,209	45.52%	26,823	-4.92%
Rohnert Park	Sonoma	10,168	66.15%	5,202	33.85%	4,966	32.31%	15,370	-5.36%
Santa Rosa	Sonoma	45,616	72.89%	16,966	27.11%	28,650	45.78%	62,582	-5.02%
Sebastopol	Sonoma	3,410	83.80%	659	16.20%	2,751	67.61%	4,069	-3.85%
Sonoma	Sonoma	4,147	74.44%	1,424	25.56%	2,723	48.88%	5,571	-5.51%
Windsor	Sonoma	6,698	62.15%	4,080	37.85%	2,618	24.29%	10,778	-8.59%
Unincorporated Area	Sonoma	42,207	69.88%	18,192	30.12%	24,015	39.76%	60,399	-5.83%
Ceres	Stanislaus	4,365	50.02%	4,362	49.98%	3	0.03%	8,727	-10.07%
Hughson	Stanislaus	702	31.58%	1,521	68.42%	-819	-36.84%	2,223	-5.91%
Modesto	Stanislaus	25,075	47.48%	27,738	52.52%	-2,663	-5.04%	52,813	-5.64%
Newman	Stanislaus	1,054	45.87%	1,244	54.13%	-190	-8.27%	2,298	-6.44%
Oakdale	Stanislaus	2,188	29.96%	5,115	70.04%	-2,927	-40.08%	7,303	-5.75%
Patterson	Stanislaus	2,885	59.98%	1,925	40.02%	960	19.96%	4,810	-4.90%
Riverbank	Stanislaus	2,332	41.93%	3,229	58.07%	-897	-16.13%	5,561	-9.77%
Turlock	Stanislaus	7,598	40.86%	10,995	59.14%	-3,397	-18.27%	18,593	-6.97%
Waterford	Stanislaus	600	30.08%	1,395	69.92%	-795	-39.85%	1,995	-4.17%
Unincorporated Area	Stanislaus	8,512	31.95%	18,132	68.05%	-9,620	-36.11%	26,644	-7.25%
Live Oak	Sutter	848	40.50%	1,246	59.50%	-398	-19.01%	2,094	-10.49%
Yuba City	Sutter	6,650	36.17%	11,736	63.83%	-5,086	-27.66%	18,386	-8.59%
Unincorporated Area	Sutter	1,584	20.77%	6,042	79.23%	-4,458	-58.46%	7,626	-5.36%
Corning	Tehama	407	29.51%	972	70.49%	-565	-40.97%	1,379	-5.05%
Red Bluff	Tehama	1,145	32.20%	2,411	67.80%	-1,266	-35.60%	3,556	-7.31%
Tehama	Tehama	53	33.54%	105	66.46%	-52	-32.91%	158	-8.89%
Unincorporated Area	Tehama	3,419	22.00%	12,119	78.00%	-8,700	-55.99%	15,538	-6.24%
Unincorporated Area	Trinity	1,860	41.09%	2,667	58.91%	-807	-17.83%	4,527	-5.49%
Dinuba	Tulare	1,756	49.69%	1,778	50.31%	-22	-0.62%	3,534	-7.39%
Exeter	Tulare	723	26.98%	1,957	73.02%	-1,234	-46.04%	2,680	-4.60%
Farmersville	Tulare	698	57.50%	516	42.50%	182	14.99%	1,214	-6.92%
Lindsay	Tulare	764	57.23%	571	42.77%	193	14.46%	1,335	-5.84%
Porterville	Tulare	3,987	42.23%	5,455	57.77%	-1,468	-15.55%	9,442	-2.65%
Tulare	Tulare	4,535	35.33%	8,302	64.67%	-3,767	-29.34%	12,837	-3.09%
Visalia	Tulare	12,639	36.38%	22,106	63.62%	-9,467	-27.25%	34,745	-4.78%
Woodlake	Tulare	602	59.02%	418	40.98%	184	18.04%	1,020	-10.14%
Unincorporated Area	Tulare	7,569	30.87%	16,950	69.13%	-9,381	-38.26%	24,519	-6.48%
Sonora	Tuolumne	808	46.76%	920	53.24%	-112	-6.48%	1,728	-4.41%
Unincorporated Area	Tuolumne	7,663	35.64%	13,839	64.36%	-6,176	-28.72%	21,502	-3.70%
Camarillo	Ventura	14,838	50.14%	14,756	49.86%	82	0.28%	29,594	-4.71%
Fillmore	Ventura	2,132	54.53%	1,778	45.47%	354	9.05%	3,910	-8.70%
Moorpark	Ventura	6,921	49.67%	7,014	50.33%	-93	-0.67%	13,935	-5.76%
Ojai	Ventura	2,625	69.70%	1,141	30.30%	1,484	39.41%	3,766	-0.73%
Oxnard	Ventura	24,140	66.77%	12,013	33.23%	12,127	33.54%	36,153	-8.41%
Port Hueneme	Ventura	3,216	62.34%	1,943	37.66%	1,273	24.68%	5,159	-6.99%
San Buenaventura	Ventura	25,573	59.79%	17,196	40.21%	8,377	19.59%	42,769	-4.01%
Santa Paula	Ventura	4,031	60.16%	2,670	39.84%	1,361	20.31%	6,701	-10.94%
Simi Valley	Ventura	21,542	45.10%	26,224	54.90%	-4,682	-9.80%	47,766	-4.11%
Thousand Oaks	Ventura	29,302	52.74%	26,257	47.26%	3,045	5.48%	55,559	-4.91%
Unincorporated Area	Ventura	18,906	53.07%	16,717	46.93%	2,189	6.14%	35,623	-2.56%
Davis	Yolo	20,639	83.19%	4,170	16.81%	16,469	66.38%	24,809	-2.89%
West Sacramento	Yolo	9,229	60.36%	6,060	39.64%	3,169	20.73%	15,289	-2.62%
Winters	Yolo	1,271	52.18%	1,165	47.82%	106	4.35%	2,436	-2.87%
Woodland	Yolo	9,865	55.94%	7,771	44.06%	2,094	11.87%	17,636	-7.69%
Unincorporated Area	Yolo	3,324	47.72%	3,641	52.28%	-317	-4.55%	6,965	-4.10%
Marysville	Yuba	920	35.47%	1,674	64.53%	-754	-29.07%	2,594	-1.72%
Wheatland	Yuba	276	23.83%	882	76.17%	-606	-52.33%	1,158	-7.74%
Unincorporated Area	Yuba	5,338	33.62%	10,541	66.38%	-5,203	-32.77%	15,879	-1.42%
Totals		6,470,104	59.18%	4,462,914	40.82%	2,007,190	18.36%	10,933,018	-5.39%

== See also ==
- 2022 United States gubernatorial elections
- 2022 California elections
