= Anna E. Reid Hall =

American artist

Anna E. Reid Hall (1857–1928) was an American artist and art collector. She was the organizer of the first private art classes west of Omaha, Nebraska; was a co-founder of the Haydon Art Club, Lincoln's first arts organization, and its successor, the Nebraska Art Association; a painter of oil and watercolor still lifes, landscapes, and figures; exhibitor with the Haydon Art Club; and advocate and benefactor of Sarah Moore in 1884 as the first art teacher at the University of Nebraska-Lincoln.

Anna and her husband, Frank M. Hall were among the founders of what is today the Sheldon Art Association and the Sheldon Museum of Art. Their bequest of artworks and creation of an acquisition endowment for the University of Nebraska helped shape the Sheldon's collection as we know it today.

== Early life and education ==
Anna E. Reid was born in 1857 near Julian in Nebraska Territory, ten years before statehood. She grew up on her family's farm, taught in a country school, and in 1880, she earned a diploma from Nebraska State Normal School, which became Peru State College.

== Career ==
Hall was one of the first art collectors in the young state of Nebraska, and many of the works she bought were by women. She also helped found the organization that would become the Sheldon Art Association.

She served as president of the Women's Club of Lincoln for several terms. She was also concerned with the welfare of the poor, working actively with the Lincoln City Mission and the Home for the Friendless. The Halls also supported missionary work in Southeast Asia.

== Works ==
- Fruit, 1884/91. Oil on board; 21.6 x 56.5. UNL-Anna R. and Frank M. Hall Collection, H-35
- Topsey, 1884/91. Oil on board; 45.7 x 30.5 cm. UNL-Anna R. and Frank M. Hall Collection, H-36
