= Adriel Hampton =

Native American entrepreneur and political strategist

- Born: 1978 (age 47–48); Modesto, California
- Citizenship: Chickasaw Nation • American
- Education: University of California, Berkeley
- Occupations: Entrepreneur; political campaign strategist
- Political party: No Party Preference

Adriel O. Hampton (born 1978) is an American entrepreneur, strategist, and political activist. He runs The Adriel Hampton Group, a digital advertising agency that supports progressive causes, and is the founder of The Really Online Lefty League political action committee (PAC).

Earlier in his career, Hampton co-founded the analytics startup Pinpoint Predictive, the podcast Gov 2.0 Radio, and the progressive Facebook community Really American. He was an early member of the organizing software company NationBuilder. In 2009, Hampton became the first person to launch a congressional candidacy via Twitter. Hampton is known for criticizing Facebook's political advertising policies, arguing that the social media giant doesn't do enough to combat false political advertising on its platform. In 2019, he launched a campaign for the 2022 California gubernatorial election as a progressive candidate, but withdrew before the filing deadline.

== Early life and education ==
Hampton was born in Modesto, California and was homeschooled. He is a citizen of the Chickasaw Nation. He worked as editor-in-chief of The Impact newspaper at San Joaquin Delta College, and graduated from University of California, Berkeley with a degree in Rhetoric. Hampton worked as an editor at the Lodi News-Sentinel, Alameda News Group, the San Francisco Examiner, and as an investigator for the San Francisco City Attorney's Office.

== Career ==
=== Founding of Government 2.0 ===
Hampton launched Government 2.0 Radio in March 2009 featuring an interview with Web 2.0 pioneer Tim O'Reilly. Hampton gained publicity for use of Twitter and Facebook in a 2009 campaign for the CA-10 seat to replace Rep. Ellen Tauscher in the House of Representatives. Hampton's campaign used collaborative editing, a form of crowdsourcing, to draft an anti-drug war policy statement.

=== 2009 congressional campaign ===
On March 18, 2009, Representative Ellen Tauscher (CA-10) was nominated by President Barack Obama to serve as Undersecretary of State for Arms Control and International Security. Hampton announced his candidacy for the subsequent special election to fill the seat, receiving national attention for being the first congressional candidate to announce their campaign launch on Twitter. During the campaign, Hampton prioritized support for single-payer healthcare, auditing the Federal Reserve, increased funding for public education, and capping interest rates. On foreign policy, Hampton stressed his support for removing U.S. troops from Afghanistan and Iraq.

During the campaign, Hampton was supported by former chair of the San Francisco Democratic Party Matthew Rothschild and Matt Gonzalez, the former president of the San Francisco Board of Supervisors.

Hampton was defeated by John Garamendi, the former Lieutenant Governor of California.

=== Post-campaign work ===
After his Congressional campaign, Hampton began working as Chief Organizer and Vice President of Business Development at NationBuilder, a Los Angeles tech startup specializing in content management and digital organizing, and which served clients such as California Governor Jerry Brown and Los Angeles Mayor Eric Garcetti. In 2015, Hampton left NationBuilder and founded a consulting firm, The Adriel Hampton Group. Also in 2015, he co-founded and served as President of Pinpoint Predictive, a San Francisco startup pioneering predictive personality advertising. Adriel's consulting firm specializes in digital advertising and community building. Hampton's clients have included phone and email append provider Accurate Append, mobile canvassing app Ecanvasser, and the activist toolset Do Gooder. He is an adviser to VoterCircle.

=== The Really Online Lefty League PAC and opposition to Facebook ===
The Really Online Lefty League (TROLL) is a political action committee (PAC) formed by Hampton. The rollout of the PAC, created in collaboration with the Institute for Progressive Memetics, included a fake advertisement for the Green New Deal. The PAC gained recognition for launching an advertisement describing conservative Senator Lindsey Graham as being in favor of Green New Deal legislation to highlight the issues stemming from Facebook's political advertising policies.

Public awareness of social media use in politics and disinformation grew in 2019 due to a congressional hearing in which Alexandria Ocasio-Cortez questioned Facebook CEO Mark Zuckerberg as to whether Facebook would be taking down ads from politicians that spread false information. Zuckerberg replied that they probably would not.

In 2019, TROLL was noted for putting up digital billboards along the Interstate 15 in Utah as well as in other states with a photo of Zuckerberg and President Donald Trump with the caption "Trump - Zuckerberg 2020" in order to raise awareness to the potential impact of Facebook's advertising policies in assisting Trump's reelection bid.

In 2020, Hampton and TROLL released a YouTube ad against Congressman Ken Calvert in the election for California's 42nd congressional district.

=== 2022 gubernatorial campaign ===
On October 29, 2019, Hampton announced he was running for governor of California in order to run fake Facebook ads. Stating that "we have some pretty serious issues of corporations now basically running society and I think Facebook is the grossest example of that", Hampton pledged that his gubernatorial campaign would serve to highlight issues stemming from the platform. A spokesperson for Facebook has since responded to his candidacy, stating that "[Hampton] has made clear he registered as a candidate to get around our policies, so his content, including ads, will continue to be eligible for third-party fact-checking."

Despite Facebook's statement, Hampton successfully ran and promoted additional fake ads as a candidate, including one that suggested Sean Hannity was replacing Mike Pence as Donald Trump's running mate, and another where Mitch McConnell appeared to publicly support impeachment of Trump.

In a 2019 editorial, the Los Angeles Times' Jon Healy wrote that Hampton "may be the most interesting gubernatorial candidate in the country at the moment" because of Hampton's targeting of Facebook as a source of political misinformation. Hampton has stated that climate change played a major role in his decision to run for governor, arguing that incumbent Gavin Newsom is tied too closely to the Pacific Gas and Electric Company.
