= Libbie Beach Brown =

American philanthropist (1858-1924)

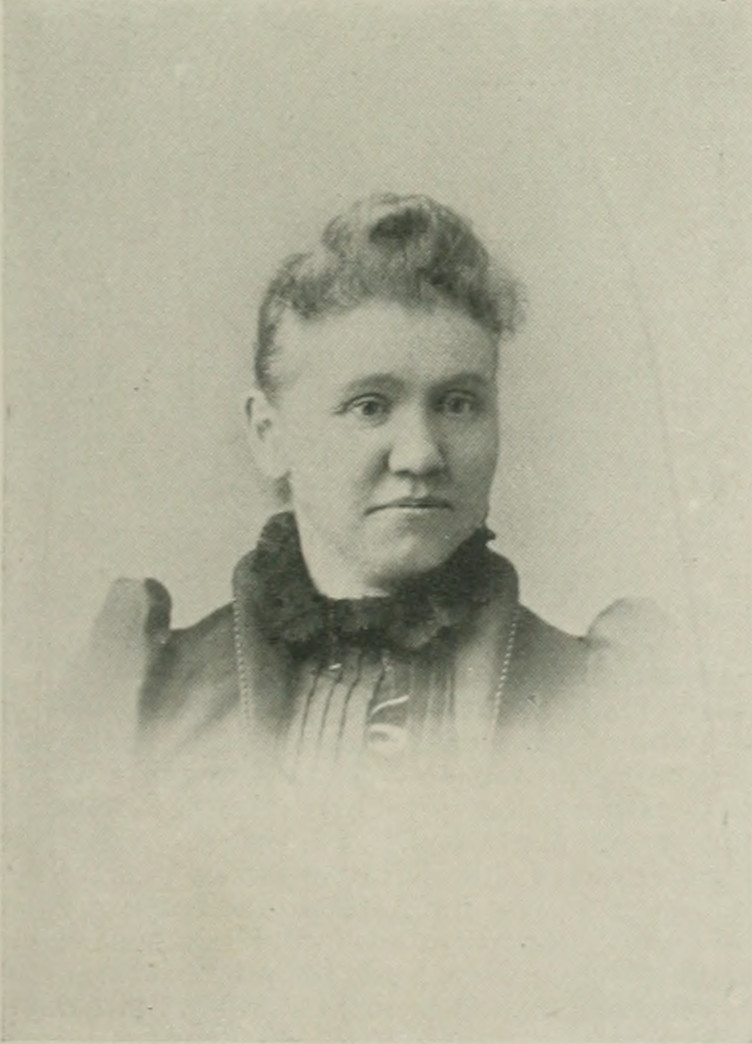
Portrait from A Woman of the Century

Libbie Beach Brown (née, Beach; after first marriage, Hoel, after second marriage, Brown; March 11, 1858 – August 28, 1924) was an American philanthropist. She was well known and influential in temperance affairs and other reform movements, and always affiliated with progressive elements.

== Early life and education ==
Libbie Belle Beach was born in Livingston County, Illinois, March 11, 1858. Family members were educators. Her parents, Freedus Poe Beach (1827-1912) and Nancy (née, Lewis) (1828-1903), were known as leaders in reform movements. Libbie had several siblings including Mary, Marcia, Carrie, Lavaun, and Clifford.

Brown was educated in a seminary.

== Career ==
Brown entered the teacher's profession, performing this work for five years before her marriage, in Champaign, Illinois in 1883, (Note: According to Willard & Livermore (1893), Libbie's first marriage occurred in 1882.) to Ernest B. Hoel. In one year, she was a wife, a mother, and a childless widow.

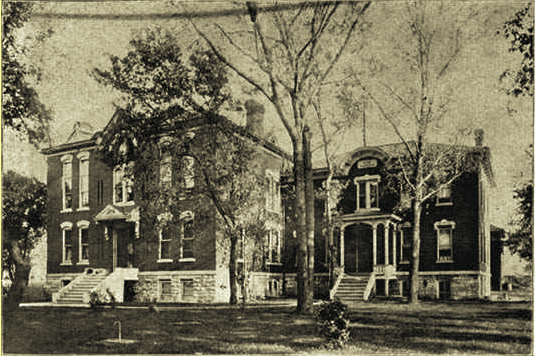
Home for the Friendless, Lincoln (1904)

She took up the teacher's vocation again, until 1890, when she accepted the position of superintendent of the Home for the Friendless, in Lincoln, Nebraska. She was sent by the Governor of Nebraska as a delegate to the National Conference of Charities and Correction held in Indianapolis, Indiana in May 1891, and went as a delegate to the same convention held in Denver, Colorado in June 1892. The press of the State praised her as a business manager. She served as the Home's superintendent for six years.

On October 3, 1895, at Trinity Methodist Episcopalian Church in Lincoln, Nebraska, she married Rev. Harrison D. Brown (1846-1940). For many years, he served the Methodist churches in Nebraska. After the nuptials, the couple removed to Portland, Oregon where Rev. Brown accepted the position of superintendent for Oregon and Washington of the children's home finding society.

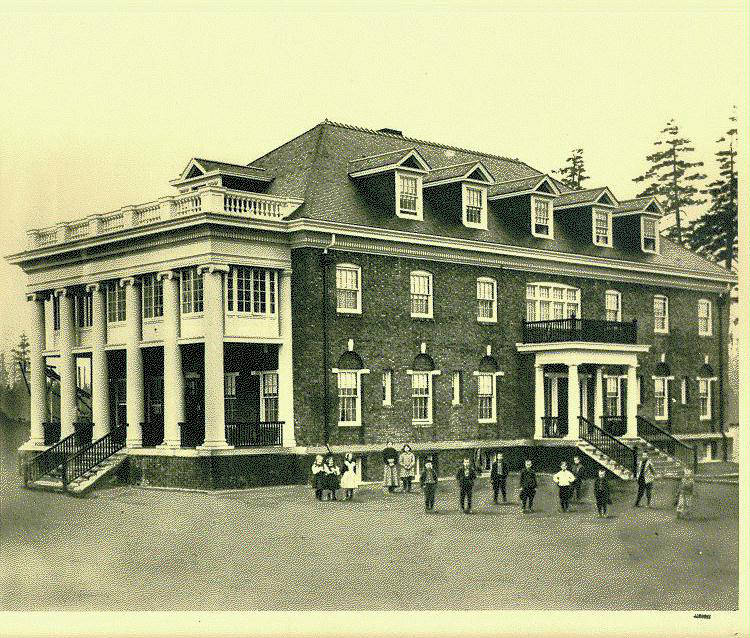
Children's Home Society of Washington (1909)

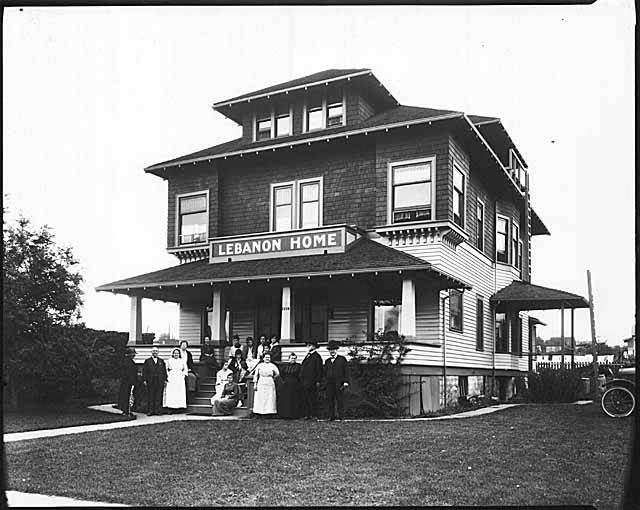
Lebanon Home (ca. 1920)

Rev. and Mrs. Brown removed to Seattle, Washington in 1896 and founded the organization that became the largest nonprofit child welfare agency in the state of Washington: the Children's Home Society of Washington. It served institutions such as the Lebanon Home for Girls where in one year, girls from 17 nations received assistance. Some of them had children and they, too, were cared for. She also served as president of Seattle's City Federation of the Woman's Christian Temperance Union (W.C.T.U.).

== Personal life ==
She was a musician, and for years made music a large part of her life-work. As a singer, she excelled.

On August 9, 1924, a Seattle newspaper reported that Brown was seriously ill. Libbie Beach Brown died at her home in Seattle, August 28, 1924. Burial was at Lake View Cemetery.
