= Anna E. Hall =

Anna E Hall
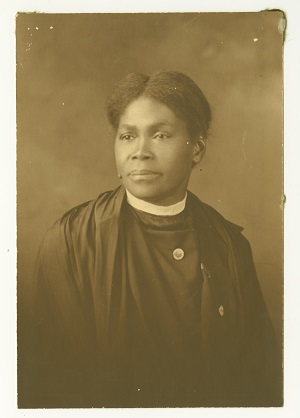
- Born: March 1, 1870; Bainbridge, Georgia, U.S.
- Died: March 6, 1964 (aged 94); Atlanta, Georgia, U.S.
- Occupations: Missionary, Deaconess
- Parent: Sarah Sutton (mother)
- Relatives: Willie Smith (brother)

Anna E. Hall (March 1, 1870 – March 6, 1964) was an African American Methodist deaconess and missionary based in Bainbridge, Georgia. She traveled across the South to complete her missionary training for 10 years after her time at Clark Atlanta University. Her most recognized missionary work was her travels to Monrovia, Liberia located in West Africa where she taught the Kru people. She also had a long history of missionary work at the Julia A. Stewart Memorial Girls Home and School, Garraway Mission where she became an influential figure over a period of twenty four years.

== Early years ==
Hall was born in Bainbridge, Georgia, to small-town seamstress Sarah Sutton. She had a brother three years younger than her named Willie Smith who died on April 30, 1897, at the young age of 25. Her father was a deacon at a local Baptist church. Her parents were separated. Anna wanted to complete missionary work while she attended Clark College, which is now known as Clark Atlanta University. However, due to lack of special training, family responsibility and financial issues she was not able to dive into her work until after she completed her studies and graduated from the university on May 12, 1892. Immediately after graduation she began teaching school in Ormund, Florida, for one year. Afterwards, she returned to Jesup, Georgia, to be principal of the Jesup School for four years. During her last administrative year her mother died in 1897.

== Missionary training ==
Anna still sought out to be a missionary and with the generosity of influential people in her life she was able to attend the New England Deaconess Training School in Boston, Massachusetts, from 1899 until her graduation on May 12, 1901. She became the first negro to attend the institution. Anna soon after expressed a desire in starting her missionary work in Africa but decided to stay in Atlanta, Georgia. She was appointed to do deaconess work at the Lloyd Street Methodist Church, which is now the Central United Methodist Church, from 1901 to 1906.

== Monrovia, Liberia ==
Anna finally got the chance to seek out on her journey when she moved to Monrovia, Liberia in December 1906. She was first appointed to teach the Kru people or the Kroo people who are a West African ethnic group known for their outstanding skills in navigating and sailing along the Atlantic. She edited a small booklet in the Kroo dialect containing the Lord's Prayer, Apostles' Creed, the Doxology, the Ten Commandments and 24 of the most familiar Christian hymns. Her 300 plus conversions were all received in the church by the bishop, the president of the College of West Africa and the American Consul.

== Garraway Mission ==
In her second year Miss Hall was appointed to the southern part of the Republic, Garraway, to be the successor of the director of the Julia A. Stewart Memorial Girls' Home and School. Miss Agnes McAllister, the Caucasian director, died from African fever, and Miss Hall was appointed to replace her for the next 24 years of her career. She served her community as a teacher, dentist, farmer, doctor and more to the people of Garraway. Although she was well known by high church officials, college presidents, presidents and heads of state, Anna lived a very humble lifestyle.

== Later years ==
After her 24 years of service Anna decided to retire from her missionary work in Garraway. She had hoped to write a book on her experiences and excursions but unfortunately the book never materialized. On November 1, 1931, she returned home to Atlanta, Georgia to find that her father had died October 22, 1931. Many changes had occurred in American culture since she had been gone but she remained in her normal and classic missionary attire. Once she settled in she returned to her original home Central Methodist Church. Anna still fulfilled her civic and welfare work by visiting local hospitals and prisons to be an aid to those in need. She then gained the name "Mama Hall" in the Atlanta Community.

== Honors and certificates ==
On October 14, 1951, the Methodist Church gave Miss Hall her local preachers license. In 1952 a new church was dedicated to her in Garraway, Liberia and was named The Anna E. Hall Methodist Church. In 1954, the construction of the Gammon Theological Seminary was built on the old south Atlanta campus for young ministers and their families. The apartments were named the Anna E. Hall apartments and were the first living quarters dedicated to Negro theological education. In 1955, Miss Hall received a personal invitation from the Government of Liberia to be a part of the Inauguration of President-elect William V. S. Tubman and Vice-president elect William R. Tolbert on January 1–9, 1956. On January 4, 1956, Anna was knighted and received a citation from the Republic of Liberia's Department of State in admiration and appreciation of her magnificent service in their community. She also visited surrounding schools, churches and small groups which held many of the people she helped during the Garraway Mission from January 23–30, 1956.

== Death ==
Miss Anna E. Hall died on March 6, 1964, at age 94 in Atlanta, Georgia. A memorial window was purchased for her by Atlantans and others who knew her at the Crystal Cathedral in Garden Grove, California.
