= Lincoln, California =

City in California, United States

- City
- City of Lincoln
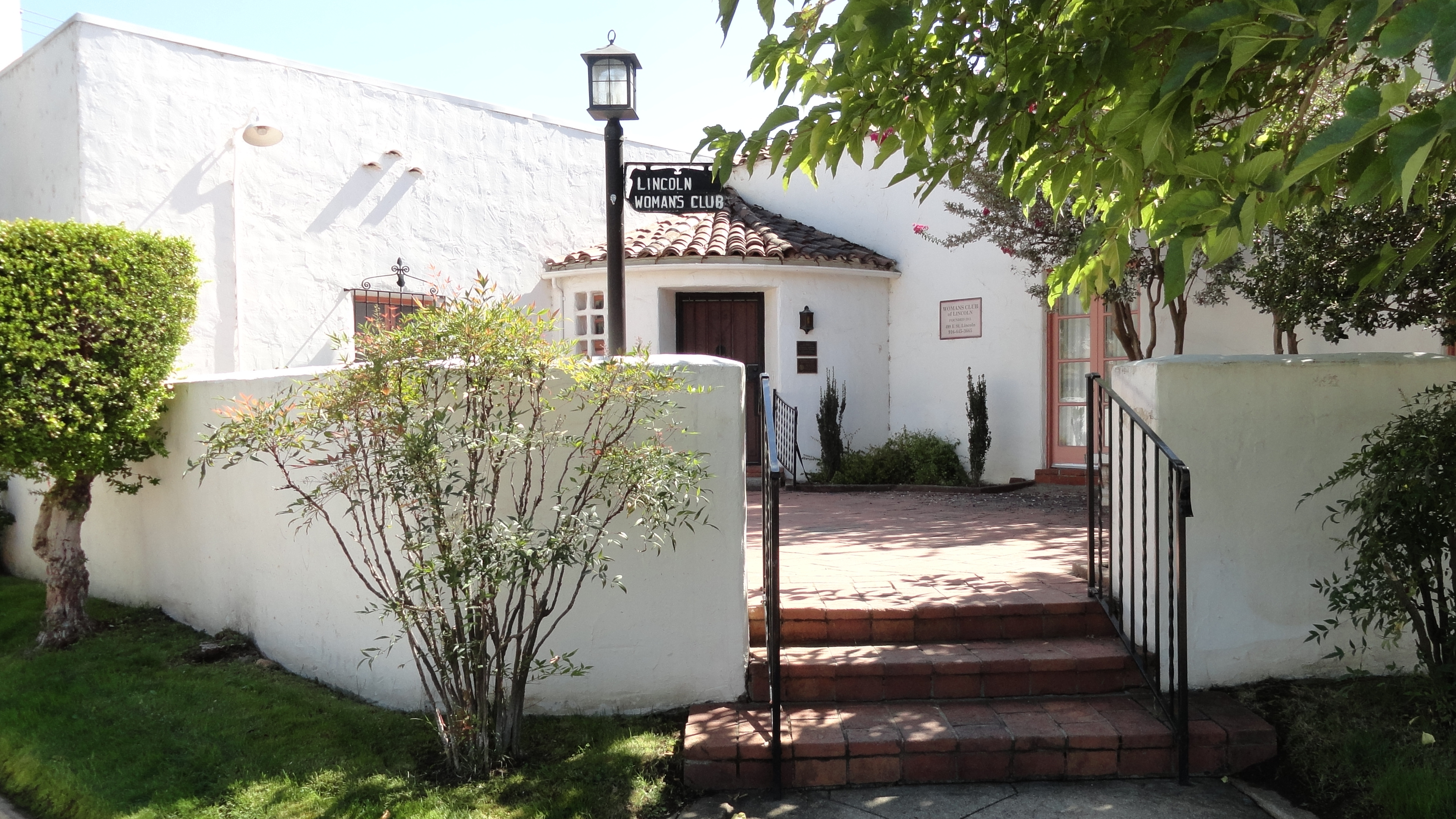
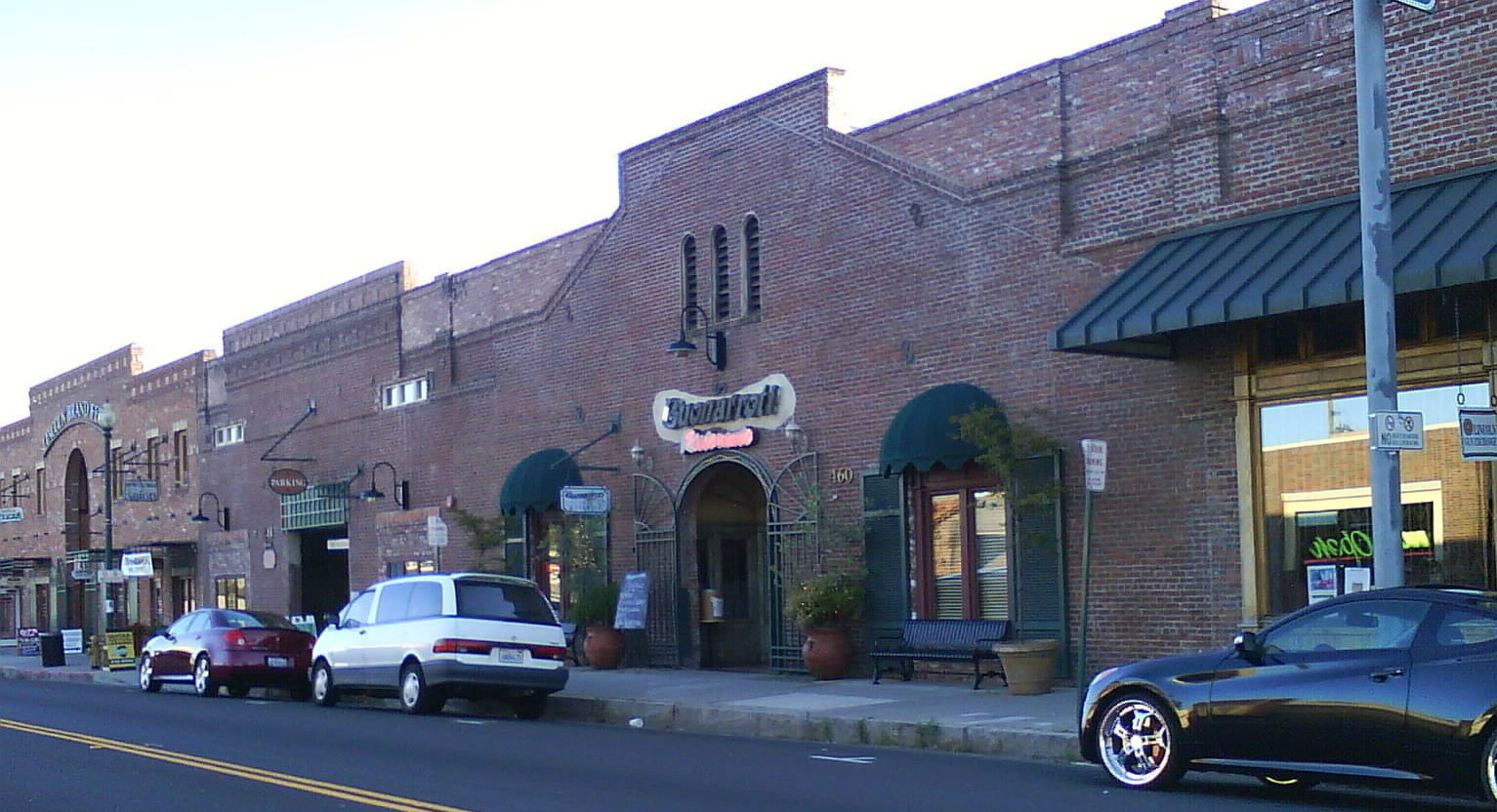
- Woman's Club of Lincoln (left) and downtown (right)

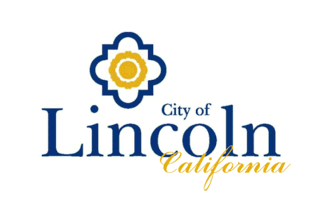
- Flag
- Interactive map of Lincoln, California
- Location within California Location within the United States
- Coordinates: 38°53′14″N 121°17′46″W
- Country: United States
- State: California
- County: Placer
- Incorporated: August 7, 1890

Government
  - Type: Council–manager
  - Mayor: Richard Pearl (since December 9, 2025)
  - State senator: Roger Niello (R)
  - Assemblymember: Joe Patterson (R)
  - U. S. rep.: Kevin Kiley (I)

Area
  - Total: 24.21 sq mi (62.71 km^{2})
  - Land: 24.17 sq mi (62.60 km^{2})
  - Water: 0.042 sq mi (0.11 km^{2}) 0.18%
- Elevation: 167 ft (51 m)

Population (2025)https://www.census.gov/quickfacts/fact/table/lincolncitycalifornia/PST045225
  - Total: 57,367
  - Density: 2,059/sq mi (794.8/km^{2})
- Time zone: UTC-08:00 (PST)
  - Summer (DST): UTC-07:00 (PDT)
- ZIP code: 95648
- Area code: 916, 279
- FIPS code: 06-41474
- GNIS feature ID: 277539
- Website: Official website

Lincoln is a city in Placer County, California, United States, part of the Sacramento metropolitan area. Located 10 miles (16 km) north of Roseville in an area of rapid suburban development, it grew 282 percent between 2000 and 2010, making it the fastest-growing city over 10,000 people in the U.S. Its population was 49,757 at the 2020 census.

Lincoln is part of the Sacramento-Roseville Metropolitan Statistical Area.

== History ==
The original townsite was surveyed and laid out in 1859 by Theodore Judah along the proposed line of the California Central Railroad. The name Lincoln was conferred in honor of Charles Lincoln Wilson, one of the organizers, who was a fundraiser and a management contractor of the California Central Railroad (CCRR). The CCRR was planned as a rail link between the cities of Marysville and Sacramento via a connection to the Sacramento Valley Railroad in Folsom. Grading from Folsom to Marysville commenced in 1858 and was completed up to Grider's Ranch (Roseville) by 1859.

At Auburn Ravine, where the line makes an elbow and turns northward toward Marysville, a new railway town Lincoln was located by Judah with town lots on sale from Wilson. At an auction in Sacramento on November 23, 1859, over $4,000 was raised from the sales of lots in Lincoln, ranging from $20 to $400 for each lot. With the grading on the first division of the road from Folsom completed 18 miles (29 km) to Lincoln, track laying began at Folsom on December 30, 1859. With the help of the Chinese laborers, the company was able to complete the railroad to Lincoln on October 14, 1861. The completion of the railroad "changed the appearance of the locality, and breathed into the town the breath of life", birthing possibly the first platted railroad town in California.

At this point, due to a lack of funds, further construction on the California Central was temporarily halted and Lincoln experienced a small-scale boom as the northern terminus of this new railroad. Within a few years, however, more investors were found and the line was extended to Wheatland, in Yuba County, bringing an end to this early stage of Lincoln's development.

When most of its population and business moved on with the railroad, the town settled into a lull until the early 1870s, when rich clay deposits of the Ione Formation were discovered nearby. This led to the establishment of Gladding, McBean & Co. and the pottery for which Lincoln is now famous, ushering in a new era of prosperity and growth.

Lincoln remained a sleepy town until the mid-1990s, when the suburbs of Sacramento started expanding beyond nearby Roseville. The city is now experiencing a new period of growth. As of the 2010 census, the population was 42,819, for a growth rate of 282 percent since 2000, making Lincoln the fastest-growing city in the United States over that decade.

In June 2003 the first casino in the greater Sacramento Metropolitan Area, the Thunder Valley Casino Resort, opened in the unincorporated outskirts of Lincoln.

In 2006, Lincoln was named an All-America City by the National Civic League. It was the only California city to be named an All-America City that year and only one of the cities to receive the prestigious award.

== Geography ==
According to the United States Census Bureau, the city has a total area of 24.2 square miles (63 km^{2}), of which 0.04 square miles (0.10 km^{2}), or 0.18 percent, is water.

== Climate ==
Lincoln has a hot-summer Mediterranean climate (Köppen: Csa) that is characterized by cool, wet winters and hot, dry summers. The wet season is generally October through April. Lincoln averages nearly 250 sunny days per year. During summer, days can become hot with an average high of 94 °F (34 °C) in July. Some days have even hit 104 °F (40 °C) and these conditions have been known to last several weeks. The cooling effect of the delta breeze from the Bay Area helps bring night temperatures down to comfortable levels. Spring and fall months are quite short transitional periods with mild temperatures. During winter months, temperatures are quite chilly with an average low of 39 °F (4 °C) in January. Some nights have reported below-freezing temperatures, though this is uncommon. Lincoln receives a little over 20.45 inches (519 mm) of precipitation a year. Snowfall is extremely rare in Lincoln but it does happen.

Climate data for Lincoln, California
Month	Jan	Feb	Mar	Apr	May	Jun	Jul	Aug	Sep	Oct	Nov	Dec	Year
Record high °F (°C)	75 (24)	78 (26)	86 (30)	98 (37)	107 (42)	110 (43)	115 (46)	110 (43)	111 (44)	102 (39)	87 (31)	76 (24)	115 (46)
Mean daily maximum °F (°C)	56 (13)	61 (16)	66 (19)	72 (22)	81 (27)	90 (32)	95 (35)	95 (35)	89 (32)	79 (26)	65 (18)	56 (13)	75 (24)
Daily mean °F (°C)	46 (8)	50 (10)	55 (13)	60 (16)	66 (19)	74 (23)	78 (26)	77 (25)	73 (23)	64 (18)	54 (12)	46 (8)	62 (17)
Mean daily minimum °F (°C)	36 (2)	39 (4)	43 (6)	47 (8)	52 (11)	58 (14)	61 (16)	61 (16)	57 (14)	49 (9)	41 (5)	37 (3)	48 (9)
Record low °F (°C)	21 (−6)	22 (−6)	27 (−3)	28 (−2)	33 (1)	39 (4)	47 (8)	45 (7)	37 (3)	27 (−3)	23 (−5)	16 (−9)	16 (−9)
Average precipitation inches (mm)	3.98 (101)	3.46 (88)	3.07 (78)	1.58 (40)	0.58 (15)	0.12 (3.0)	0.04 (1.0)	0.06 (1.5)	0.35 (8.9)	1.08 (27)	2.80 (71)	3.33 (85)	20.45 (519.4)
Average precipitation days	9	8	9	5	3	1	1	1	1	3	7	9	57
Source: http://www.myforecast.com/bin/climate.m?city=11897&zip_code=95648&metric=false

== Demographics ==
Historical population
Census	Pop.	Note	%±
1880	275		—
1890	961		249.5%
1900	1,061		10.4%
1910	1,402		32.1%
1920	1,325		−5.5%
1930	2,094		58.0%
1940	2,044		−2.4%
1950	2,410		17.9%
1960	3,197		32.7%
1970	3,176		−0.7%
1980	4,132		30.1%
1990	7,248		75.4%
2000	11,205		54.6%
2010	42,819		282.1%
2020	49,757		16.2%
U.S. Decennial Census

=== 2020 census ===
As of the 2020 census, Lincoln had a population of 49,757. The population density was 2,058.6 inhabitants per square mile (794.8/km^{2}).

The census reported that 99.7% of the population lived in households, 0.1% lived in non-institutionalized group quarters, and 0.2% were institutionalized. 98.7% of residents lived in urban areas, while 1.3% lived in rural areas.

There were 18,922 households, of which 30.4% had children under the age of 18 living in them. Of all households, 60.1% were married-couple households, 4.7% were cohabiting couple households, 10.8% were households with a male householder and no spouse or partner present, and 24.4% were households with a female householder and no spouse or partner present. 23.1% of households were made up of individuals, and 17.0% had someone living alone who was 65 years of age or older. The average household size was 2.62. There were 13,717 families (72.5% of all households).

The age distribution was 23.2% under the age of 18, 6.0% aged 18 to 24, 21.3% aged 25 to 44, 21.0% aged 45 to 64, and 28.4% aged 65 or older. The median age was 44.6 years. For every 100 females there were 90.2 males, and for every 100 females age 18 and over there were 86.8 males age 18 and over.

There were 19,480 housing units at an average density of 806.0 units per square mile (311.2 units/km^{2}), of which 18,922 (97.1%) were occupied. Of occupied units, 81.3% were owner-occupied and 18.7% were occupied by renters. The homeowner vacancy rate was 0.9% and the rental vacancy rate was 2.4%.

Racial composition as of the 2020 census
Race	Number	Percentage
White	34,973	70.3%
Black or African American	882	1.8%
American Indian and Alaska Native	420	0.8%
Asian	3,158	6.3%
Native Hawaiian and Other Pacific Islander	149	0.3%
Some other race	3,759	7.6%
Two or more races	6,416	12.9%
Hispanic or Latino (of any race)	10,037	20.2%

=== 2023 ACS estimates ===
In 2023, the US Census Bureau estimated that 11.7% of the population were foreign-born. Of all people aged 5 or older, 84.6% spoke only English at home, 7.5% spoke Spanish, 4.0% spoke other Indo-European languages, 3.4% spoke Asian or Pacific Islander languages, and 0.6% spoke other languages. Of those aged 25 or older, 94.0% were high school graduates and 38.4% had a bachelor's degree.

The median household income in 2023 was $108,108, and the per capita income was $52,006. About 6.2% of families and 7.7% of the population were below the poverty line.

=== 2010 census ===
At the 2010 census Lincoln had a population of 42,819. The population density was 2,127.1 inhabitants per square mile (821.3 inhabitants per square kilometer). The racial makeup of Lincoln was 34,087 (79.6%) White, 629 (1.5%) African American, 399 (0.9%) Native American, 2,663 (6.2%) Asian, 115 (0.3%) Pacific Islander, 3,125 (7.3%) from other races, and 1,801 (4.2%) from two or more races. Hispanic or Latino of any race were 7,597 persons (17.7%).

The census reported that 42,704 people (99.7% of the population) lived in households, 30 (0.1%) lived in non-institutionalized group quarters, and 85 (0.2%) were institutionalized.

There were 16,479 households, 5,190 (31.5%) had children under the age of 18 living in them, 10,365 (62.9%) were opposite-sex married couples living together, 1,202 (7.3%) had a female householder with no husband present, 586 (3.6%) had a male householder with no wife present. There were 775 (4.7%) unmarried opposite-sex partnerships, and 110 (0.7%) same-sex married couples or partnerships. 3,518 households (21.3%) were one person and 2,128 (12.9%) had someone living alone who was 65 or older. The average household size was 2.59. There were 12,153 families (73.7% of households); the average family size was 3.01.

The age distribution was 10,382 people (24.2%) under the age of 18, 2,360 people (5.5%) aged 18 to 24, 10,862 people (25.4%) aged 25 to 44, 9,166 people (21.4%) aged 45 to 64, and 10,049 people (23.5%) who were 65 or older. The median age was 40.5 years. For every 100 females, there were 92.5 males. For every 100 females aged 18 and over, there were 89.6 males.

There were 17,457 housing units at an average density of 867.2 per square mile, of the occupied units 13,115 (79.6%) were owner-occupied and 3,364 (20.4%) were rented. The homeowner vacancy rate was 2.5%; the rental vacancy rate was 4.7%. 32,473 people (75.8% of the population) lived in owner-occupied housing units and 10,231 people (23.9%) lived in rental housing units.

== Parks and recreation ==
Lincoln contains 25 municipal parks, including McBean Park, named for one of the founders of Gladding, McBean & Co.
