= Nebraska home for dependent children =

Charitable facility for homeless children and women

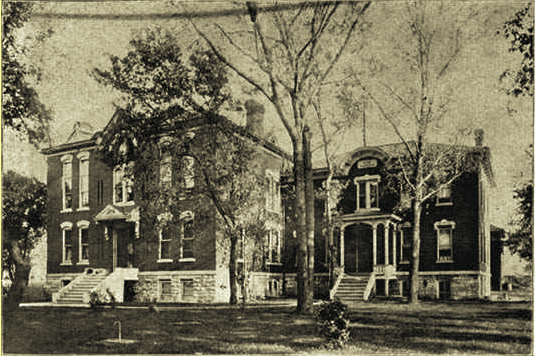
Home for the Friendless, Lincoln (1904)

The Nebraska home for dependent children (originally, Home for the Friendless) was an American charitable organization situated at the corner of Eleventh and South streets, in Lincoln, Nebraska. This Home was duly incorporated in 1876. So many came for protection that in 1881, the legislature made an appropriation of US$5,000 for the erection of a permanent building. For some years there after the board of managers and the state shared responsibility and authority for this Home, the state making appropriations from time to time for improvements and maintenance. Later, the state obtained control by refusing to make appropriation unless given complete authority. A further restriction upon appropriations for this institution made the Home available only for children who were subject to adoption. In 1897, it was placed under the immediate control of the state and in 1914, it was placed under the board of control of state institutions.

== Early history ==
In 1876, charitable women organized home for the friendless societies in various parts of the state, having for their object the maintenance of a home in Lincoln, for homeless women and children. This Home was duly incorporated in 1876 by some charitable women to afford a home for homeless children, and homeless women, young or old. A duly constituted board of women managed the institution.

The Legislature of 1881, provided for the location of a Home for the Friendless at such town or city in Nebraska as should, after notice by the Board of Public Lands and Buildings, "donate the largest amount to said Home." Under notice duly published, the city of Lincoln was the only bidder, and its proposition to donate US$2,050, to said home was accepted by said board, and by an order of the Board of Public Lands and Buildings the home for the friendless was located at Lincoln, Nebraska.

A tract of improved land, with buildings, comprising two and seven hundredths (2.07) acres, at the south end of Eleventh street, adjoining the city of Lincoln, was purchased for the sum of US$2,100, and on August 24, 1882, the contract for the erection of the home was let, for the sum of US$3,599.77, the Society of the Home for the Friendless agreeing to pay such cost over the amount appropriated. The building would be turned over to the society upon completion.

During the period of 1890-95, Libbie Beach Brown served as the institution's superintendent.

=== Architecture and fittings ===
The original Home had five buildings and a small greenhouse. The buildings were main and school buildings, laundry, cottage or hospital and barn. The three first-named were brick, the other two, frame. The main and school buildings were two stories and basement; the laundry, two stories with boiler underneath.

- Main building: The basement was used for kitchen, storeroom, girls' bathroom, children's dining room, girls' playroom and boys' washroom. The first floor contained an office, parlors, officers', employees' and old ladies' dining rooms, two sleeping rooms, also halls and store room. The second floor contained the first nursery and bathroom for same, three sleeping rooms, girls' dormitory and clothes room.
- School building: In the basement were the boys' playroom, one washroom, kindergarten room, and two rooms, one occupied by engineer and the other by man-of-all-work. The first floor contained the chapel, schoolroom, matron's rooms, second nursery, boys' dormitory and washrooms for same. The second floor contained the boys' dormitory and bathroom and four rooms occupied by helpers.
- Laundry building: Engines and boiler were housed in the basement, two boilers, one 40-horse power and one 35-horse power; engine, 10-horse power; one automatic feed pump, one coal bin capable of holding one car of steam coal. On the first floor were the laundry in which was one steam washer, one steam wringer, three steam tubs, six stationary tubs, laundry stove, clothes bars, and one dry room adjoining. On the second floor, there were three sleeping rooms for employees.
- Cottage of hospital. A small building of four rooms and bath. This included a drug room and a large room for quarantine purposes in case of contagious diseases.
- Barn. This had accommodation for six cows and four horses; also carriage space.

== Control of the state ==
By an act approved April 13, 1897, the home for the friendless was placed under the immediate control of the state, and an advisory board of women provided for.

== State public school ==
It became apparent that the policy of collecting children and old ladies in a home, without adequate provision for placing the children in private homes by adoption or otherwise should be abandoned. In 1909, the legislature created the state public school for dependent children and located it at the home for the friendless, where, on July 2, 1909, 38 boys and 18 girls were taken charge of by the new board. By opinion of the attorney general, given April 16, 1914, the board of control of state institutions assumed the direction of this institution. It was renamed by the board "Nebraska home for dependent children".

This institution was to receive those "children under sixteen years of age and of sound mind who have been committed to it by any juvenile court, district court, or county court, acting under the juvenile court law," as children who are dependent for support, neglected or ill-treated. The law required the officers of this board to place the children in homes. The buildings formerly occupied by the home for the friendless were transferred to the city's orthopedic hospital.

== New building, 1917 ==
A new building was completed and occupied in 1917 and the "boarding out" plan was then abandoned.

== New site, 1925 ==
The legislature of 1925 appropriated $75,000 for land and buildings for a new site for the home. A large residence in University Place, and land adjacent to it were purchased. This gave the children room for a garden and pets. During the twenty-four months ending July 1, 1925, in all, 475 children were cared for by the home. Of these, 91 returned from trial homes, 238 were placed in trial homes, 34 were returned to parents or friends, 51 were adopted, 19 died, 17 attained majority, and 13 were transferred to other institutions. At the end of the period, 99 children were present in the home. The per capita cost of maintenance that year was $374.52.

== Assignment of custody ==
In 1947, Nebraska Legal News addressed assignment of custody stating that "delinquent children shall be committed to a state industrial school, and dependent or neglected children to the Nebraska Home for Dependent Children".
