= Annie Hall (businesswoman) =

British businesswoman (died 2019)

High Sheriff of Derbyshire
- In office 2017–2018
- Preceded by: Elizabeth Fothergill
- Succeeded by: Lucy Palmer

Personal details
- Born: 1949/1950
- Died: 8 November 2019 (aged 69) Derbyshire, England
- Spouse: Michael Hall
- Profession: Businessperson

Annie Hall (1949/50– 8 November 2019) was a British businesswoman who served as High Sheriff of Derbyshire for the year 2017–2018. She was the first woman to be president of Derbyshire Chamber of Commerce. She was also vice-chair of Derbyshire Mental Health NHS Trust, chair of the council of Derby Cathedral, and a trustee of the charity Foundation Derbyshire. Hall studied psychiatric nursing. Hall died on 8 November 2019 after being swept away by the flooded River Derwent at Rowsley, following a period of unusually heavy rainfall.

== Life ==
Annie Hall was a British businesswoman who served as High Sheriff of Derbyshire for the year 2017–2018. She was the first woman to be president of Derbyshire Chamber of Commerce. She was also vice-chair of Derbyshire Mental Health NHS Trust, chair of the council of Derby Cathedral, and a trustee of the charity Foundation Derbyshire.

Hall was raised in Wincanton, Somerset, and educated at a Catholic school nearby. She subsequently studied psychiatric nursing. She married her first husband, and the couple subsequently moved from Somerset to Derbyshire, where they set up a business manufacturing industrial winches. She later married Mr Michael Hall.

She died on 8 November 2019 after being swept away by the flooded River Derwent at Rowsley, following a period of unusually heavy rainfall. The inquest heard; The car she and her husband were in entered deep water near Darley Bridge, eventually becoming stranded, and they decided to get out of the car and walk out of the flooded area. As they tried to progress, the conditions were deteriorating markedly, she fell a number of times and on the last fall was taken away under a fence by the flood water. He survived by managing to hold on to a lamppost. Her body was found around 2 miles (3.2 km) downstream, near Darley Dale, some two hours later.

Hall was 69 at the time of her death, and was a resident of Ashford-in-the-Water.
