= Woman's Club of Lincoln =

- U.S. National Register of Historic Places
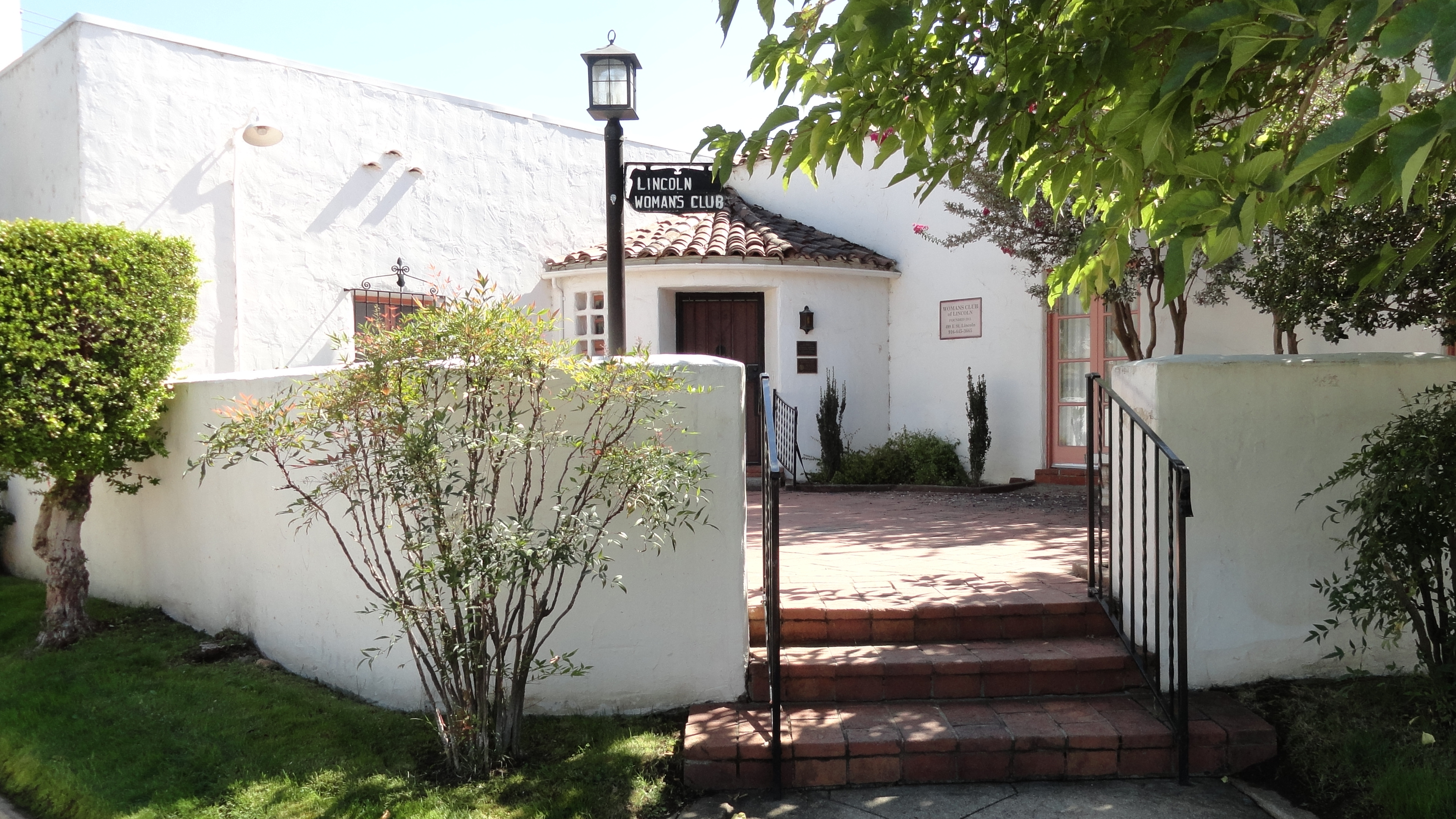

- Location within California
- Location: 499 E St., Lincoln, California
- Coordinates: 38°53′29″N 121°17′19″W
- Area: less than one acre
- Built by: William V. Whitsell, contractor
- Architect: Dean and Dean
- Architectural style: Mission/Spanish Revival
- NRHP reference No.: 01000331
- Added to NRHP: May 30, 2001

The Woman's Club of Lincoln is a historic women's club. Its clubhouse, at 499 E St. in Lincoln, California, was listed on the National Register of Historic Places in 2001.

The club began as a Woman's Improvement Club in 1911 "for the purpose of serving the community and enriching the lives of its members. This women's group eventually became the Woman's Club of Lincoln, a club historically significant for its involvement in the welfare of the citizens of the community and its interest in the betterment and beautification of the City of Lincoln." It organized more formally, by adopting by-laws, in 1922 and had its building constructed during 1923–24. The clubhouse is a one-story stuccoed wood-frame 62 by 55 feet (19 m × 17 m) building with a red clay tile roof.
