= Home for the Friendless =

Home for the Friendless or Home of the Friendless may refer to:

- Home of the Friendless (Baltimore, Maryland), a historic orphanage building
- Nebraska home for dependent children, a care facility for adoptable children in Lincoln, Nebraska, US
- The Home of the Friendless, an elderly care facility in St. Louis, Missouri, US
- Clarissa Cook Home for the Friendless, a historic building in Davenport, Iowa, US
- American Female Guardian Society and Home for the Friendless, New York City, US
- Home for the Friendless, now Lafayette Home Hospital, Indiana, US
- Home of the Friendless (Paducah, Kentucky), on the National Register of Historic Places

== See also ==
- Home for Friendless Children, Des Moines, US
- Springfield Home for Friendless Women and Children, Massachusetts, US
- Zita's Home for Friendless Women, New York City, US
