= List of defunct Catholic religious institutes =

This is a list of religious institutes of the Catholic Church that are now defunct.

This page lists religious institutes of the Catholic Church that are now defunct. This includes institutes that have merged, been suppressed, disbanded or died out:

- Merged refers to institutes who have either formed a new institute with another group, or joined another institute altogether.
- Suppressed refers to institutes who have been forcibly disbanded by an ecclesiastical or secular authority, usually for political or religious reasons.
- Disbanded refers to institutes who have decided to break up by the institute's own choice or authority, usually due to lack of numbers or a drastic change in circumstances or resources.
- Died out refers to institutes which ceased to exist upon the death of their last living member.

The list includes not only pontifical right but also diocesan right institutes (institutes established within a diocese, under the authority of a bishop). It also includes associations formed with a view to becoming religious institutes but were never canonically erected even on the diocesan level. The list does not distinguish between institutes that would have historically been classified as religious orders, whose members make solemn vows, and religious congregations, whose members make simple vows. Since the 1983 Code of Canon Law, only the term religious institute is used, while the distinction between solemn and simple vows is still maintained.

== List ==
| Name | Initials | Founded | Defunct | Family | Reason | Notes |
|---|---|---|---|---|---|---|
| Sisters of Mercy of Papua New Guinea | R.S.M. | 1956 | 2011 | Sisters of Mercy | Merged | Merged into the Sisters of Mercy of Australia and Papua New Guinea |
| Benedictine Congregation of Portugal and Brazil | O.S.B. | 1597 | 1889 | Benedictine | Suppressed | |
| Brethren of the Common Life | F.V.C. | 1370s | Early 1600s | | Died out | One Lutheran house survived until 1841 |
| Brothers of Our Lady of the Fields | | 1902 | 1931 | | Merged | Joined with the Clerics of Saint Viator |
| Canons Regular of the Holy Sepulchre | | 1113 | 1830 | Augustinians | Suppressed | |
| Catechist Missionary Sisters of St. John Bosco | | 1938 | | | Died out | |
| Celestine Order | O.S.B. Cel. | 1254 | 18th century | Benedictine | Died out | |
| Congregation of St. Mary | O.P. | 1860 | 2009 | Dominican | Merged | Merged into the Dominican Sisters of Peace |
| Congregation of St. Rose of Lima | O.P. | 1950 | 2009 | Dominican | Merged | Merged into the Dominican Sisters of Peace |
| Daughters of Mary, Health of the Sick | F.M.S.I. | 1935 | 1976 | | Disbanded | |
| Dominicans of St. Catharine | O.P. | 1822 | 2009 | Dominican | Merged | Merged into the Dominican Sisters of Peace |
| Dominican Sisters of Great Bend, Kansas | O.P. | 1902 | 2009 | Dominican | Merged | Merged into the Dominican Sisters of Peace |
| Dominican Sisters of Newburgh | O.P. | 1883 | 1995 | Dominican | Merged | Merged into the Dominican Sisters of Hope |
| Dominican Sisters of St. Mary of the Springs | O.P. | 1830 | 2009 | Dominican | Merged | Merged into the Dominican Sisters of Peace |
| Dominican Sisters of St. Catherine de' Ricci | O.P. | 1880 | 2009 | Dominican | Merged | Merged into the Dominican Sisters of Peace |
| Dominican Sisters of St. Catherine of Siena (Fall River) | O.P. | 1891 | 1995 | Dominican | Merged | Merged to form the Dominican Sisters of Hope |
| Dominican Sisters of the Sick Poor | O.P. | 1910 | 1995 | Dominican | Merged | Merged into the Dominican Sisters of Hope |
| Eucharistic Missionaries of St. Dominic | O.P. | 1927 | 2009 | Dominican | Merged | Merged into the Dominican Sisters of Peace |
| Fontevrist Order | | 1099 | 1792 | | Suppressed | Disbanded during the French Revolution |
| Franciscan Missionary Sisters of the Divine Child | F.M.D.C. | 1927 | 2003 | Franciscan | Merged | Merged with the Sisters of St. Francis of the Neumann Communities |
| Franciscan Sisters of Baltimore | O.S.F. | 1881 | 2001 | Franciscan | Merged | Merged with the Sisters of St. Francis of Assisi |
| Gilbertine Order | GSmp | 1130 | 1539 | Gilbertine | Suppressed | Disbanded during the Dissolution of the monasteries in England. Later revived in the 20th century |
| Haudriettes | | Early 14th century | c. 1789 | | Suppressed | Disbanded during the French Revolution |
| Hospital Brothers of St. Anthony | C.R.S. Ant. | 1095 | 1803 | | Suppressed | |
| Humiliati | O. Hum. | 1140 | 1571 | | Suppressed | |
| Jesuati | C.S.H. | 1360 | 1668 | Augustinians | Suppressed | Abolished by Pope Clement IX, perhaps due to abuses |
| Little Brothers of St. Francis | L.B.S.F. | 1970 | 2012 | Franciscan | Disbanded | |
| Livonian Order | | 1237 | 1561 | Teutonic Order | Disbanded | |
| Order of Reformed Friars Minor | O.F.M. Ref. | 1532 | 1897 | Franciscan | Merged | |
| Order of Saint-Ruf | | 1039 | 1774 | Augustinian | Suppressed | |
| Order of Solomon's Temple | O.T.S. | 1119 | 1312 | | Suppressed | |
| Priestly Fraternity of Familia Christi | F.S.F.C. | 2014 | 2019 | | Suppressed | |
| Sisters of the Child Jesus of Aurillac | R.E.J. | 1804 | 1952 | Sisters of the Child Jesus | Merged | |
| Sisters of the Child Jesus of Versailles | R.E.J. | 1680 | 1949 | Sisters of the Child Jesus | Merged | |
| Sisters of Mary | S.S.M. | 1874 | 1985 | Franciscan | Merged | Merged into the Franciscan Sisters of Mary |
| Sisters of Mercy of Adelaide | R.S.M. | 1880 | 2011 | Sisters of Mercy | Merged | Merged into the Sisters of Mercy of Australia and Papua New Guinea |
| Sisters of Mercy of Auckland | R.S.M. | 1850 | 2005 | Sisters of Mercy | Merged | |
| Sisters of Mercy of Ballarat East | R.S.M. | 1881 | 2011 | Sisters of Mercy | Merged | Merged into the Sisters of Mercy of Australia and Papua New Guinea |
| Sisters of Mercy of Bathurst | R.S.M. | 1866 | 2011 | Sisters of Mercy | Merged | Merged into the Sisters of Mercy of Australia and Papua New Guinea |
| Sisters of Mercy of Bermondsey, London | R.S.M. | 1839 | 1994 | Sisters of Mercy | Merged | |
| Sisters of Mercy of Birmingham | R.S.M. | 1841 | 1994 | Sisters of Mercy | Merged | |
| Sisters of Mercy of Birr | R.S.M. | 1840 | 1994 | Sisters of Mercy | Merged | |
| Sisters of Mercy of Cairns | R.S.M. | 1888 | 2011 | Sisters of Mercy | Merged | Merged into the Sisters of Mercy of Australia and Papua New Guinea |
| Sisters of Mercy of Carlow | R.S.M. | 1837 | 1994 | Sisters of Mercy | Merged | |
| Sisters of Mercy of Charleville | R.S.M. | 1836 | 1994 | Sisters of Mercy | Merged | |
| Sisters of Mercy of Christchurch | R.S.M. | 1878 | 2005 | Sisters of Mercy | Merged | |
| Sisters of Mercy of Cork | R.S.M. | 1837 | 1994 | Sisters of Mercy | Merged | |
| Sisters of Mercy of Dunedin | R.S.M. | 1897 | 2005 | Sisters of Mercy | Merged | |
| Sisters of Mercy of Galway | R.S.M. | 1840 | 1994 | Sisters of Mercy | Merged | |
| Sisters of Mercy of Goulburn | R.S.M. | 1859 | 2011 | Sisters of Mercy | Merged | Merged into the Sisters of Mercy of Australia and Papua New Guinea |
| Sisters of Mercy of Grafton | R.S.M. | 1883 | 2011 | Sisters of Mercy | Merged | Merged into the Sisters of Mercy of Australia and Papua New Guinea |
| Sisters of Mercy of Gunnedah | R.S.M. | 1879 | 2011 | Sisters of Mercy | Merged | Merged into the Sisters of Mercy of Australia and Papua New Guinea |
| Sisters of Mercy of Johannesburg | R.S.M. | 1898 | 1994 | Sisters of Mercy | Merged | |
| Sisters of Mercy of Melbourne | R.S.M. | 1857 | 2011 | Sisters of Mercy | Merged | Merged into the Sisters of Mercy of Australia and Papua New Guinea |
| Sisters of Mercy of New Jersey | R.S.M. | 1873 | 1991 | Sisters of Mercy | Merged | Merged into the Sisters of Mercy of the Americas |
| Sisters of Mercy of Perth | R.S.M. | 1846 | 2011 | Sisters of Mercy | Merged | Merged into the Sisters of Mercy of Australia and Papua New Guinea |
| Sisters of Mercy of Rockhampton | R.S.M. | 1873 | 2011 | Sisters of Mercy | Merged | Merged into the Sisters of Mercy of Australia and Papua New Guinea |
| Sisters of Mercy of Singleton | R.S.M. | 1875 | 2011 | Sisters of Mercy | Merged | Merged into the Sisters of Mercy of Australia and Papua New Guinea |
| Sisters of Mercy of Townsville | R.S.M. | 1878 | 2011 | Sisters of Mercy | Merged | Merged into the Sisters of Mercy of Australia and Papua New Guinea |
| Sisters of Mercy of Tullamore | R.S.M. | 1836 | 1994 | Sisters of Mercy | Merged | |
| Sisters of Mercy of Wellington | R.S.M. | 1861 | 2005 | Sisters of Mercy | Merged | |
| Sisters of Mercy of West Perth | R.S.M. | 1896 | 2011 | Sisters of Mercy | Merged | Merged into the Sisters of Mercy of Australia and Papua New Guinea |
| Sisters of Mercy of Wilcannia-Forbes | R.S.M. | 1890 | 2011 | Sisters of Mercy | Merged | Merged into the Sisters of Mercy of Australia and Papua New Guinea |
| Sisters of Providence of Rodez | S.P. | | 1856 | Sisters of Providence | Merged | |
| Sisters of Reparation of the Congregation of Mary | S.R.C.M. | 1903 | 2020 | | Died out | Also known as the Sisters of St. Zita |
| Sisters of St. Dominic of the Immaculate Heart of Mary | O.P. | 1929 | 2009 | Dominican | Merged | Merged into the Dominican Sisters of Peace |
| Sisters of St. Francis of Maryville | S.S.M. | 1894 | 1985 | Franciscan | Merged | Merged into the Franciscan Sisters of Mary |
| Sisters of St. Francis of Millvale | O.S.F. | 1868 | 2007 | Franciscan | Merged | Merged into the Sisters of St. Francis of the Neumann Communities |
| Sisters of St. Francis of the Mission of the Immaculate Virgin | O.S.F. | 1895 | 2004 | Franciscan | Merged | Merged into the Sisters of St. Francis of the Neumann Communities |
| Sisters of St. Francis, Third Order Regular of Buffalo (Williamsville Franciscans) | O.S.F. | 1863 | 2004 | Franciscan | Merged | Merged into the Sisters of St. Francis of the Neumann Communities |
| Sisters of St. Joseph of Bourg | S.S.J. | 1819 | 1996 | Sisters of St. Joseph | Merged | |
| Sisters of St. Joseph of Cleveland | C.S.J. | 1872 | 2007 | Sisters of St. Joseph | Merged | Merged into the Congregation of St. Joseph |
| Sisters of St. Joseph of Kyoto | C.S.J. | 1950 | 2007 | Sisters of St. Joseph | Merged | |
| Sisters of St. Joseph of Fall River, Massachusetts | C.S.J. | 1902 | 1974 | Sisters of St. Joseph | Merged | |
| Sisters of St. Joseph of Hamilton, Ontario | C.S.J. | 1851 | 2012 | Sisters of St. Joseph | Merged | |
| Sisters of St. Joseph of La Grange, Illinois | C.S.J. | 1899 | 2007 | Sisters of St. Joseph | Merged | Merged into the Congregation of St. Joseph |
| Sisters of St. Joseph of London, Ontario | C.S.J. | 1868 | 2012 | Sisters of St. Joseph | Merged | |
| Sisters of St. Joseph of Medaille | C.S.J. | 1854 | 2007 | Sisters of St. Joseph | Merged | Merged into the Congregation of St. Joseph |
| Sisters of St. Joseph of Nazareth, Michigan | C.S.J. | 1889 | 2007 | Sisters of St. Joseph | Merged | Merged into the Congregation of St. Joseph |
| Sisters of St. Joseph of Novara | C.S.J. | | 2006 | Sisters of St. Joseph | Merged | |
| Sisters of St. Joseph of Pembroke, Ontario | C.S.J. | 1921 | 2012 | Sisters of St. Joseph | Merged | |
| Sisters of St. Joseph of Peterborough, Ontario | C.S.J. | 1890 | 2012 | Sisters of St. Joseph | Merged | |
| Sisters of St. Joseph of Superior, Michigan | C.S.J. | | | Sisters of St. Joseph | Merged | |
| Sisters of St. Joseph of Rhode Island | C.S.J. | | 1974 | Sisters of St. Joseph | | |
| Sisters of St. Joseph of Rutland, Vermont | C.S.J. | 1873 | 2001 | Sisters of St. Joseph | Merged | |
| Sisters of Saint Joseph of Susa | C.S.J. | | 2006 | Sisters of St. Joseph | Merged | |
| Sisters of St. Joseph of Tipton, Indiana | C.S.J. | 1888 | 2007 | Sisters of St. Joseph | Merged | Merged into the Congregation of St. Joseph |
| Sisters of St. Joseph of Turin | C.S.J. | | 2006 | Sisters of St. Joseph | Merged | |
| Sisters of St. Joseph of Wheeling, West Virginia | C.S.J. | 1853 | 2007 | Sisters of St. Joseph | Merged | Merged into the Congregation of St. Joseph |
| Sisters of St. Joseph of Wichita, Kansas | C.S.J. | 1883 | 2007 | Sisters of St. Joseph | Merged | Merged into the Congregation of St. Joseph |
| Sisters of St. Mary | S.S.M. | 1872 | 1985 | Franciscan | Merged | |
| Sisters of St. Therese | | 1950 | 1968 | | Merged | |
| Sisters of the Third Franciscan Order | O.S.F. | 1860 | 2004 | Franciscan | Merged | |
| Society of Christ Our King | | 1931 | Early 1970s | | Disbanded | |
| Ursuline Sisters of Pittsburgh | | | 1958 | Ursuline | Merged | |
| Vincentian Sisters of Charity | V.S.C. | 1902 | 2008 | Vincentian-Setonian | Merged | Merged into the Sisters of Charity of Nazareth |
