= Orchard Place =

Orchard Place may refer to:

- Orchard Place Airport/Douglas Field, now called O'Hare International Airport and still abbreviated as "ORD"
- Orchard Place, Des Moines, Iowa, a social service agency in Des Moines Iowa providing mental health services to youth and families.
- Orchard Place, Illinois, the small community where the airport was originally built and received its name
- Orchard Place, London, a peninsula on the River Thames in Tower Hamlets, London
