= Notre-Dame-de-l'Assomption, Paris =

Catholic church in Paris

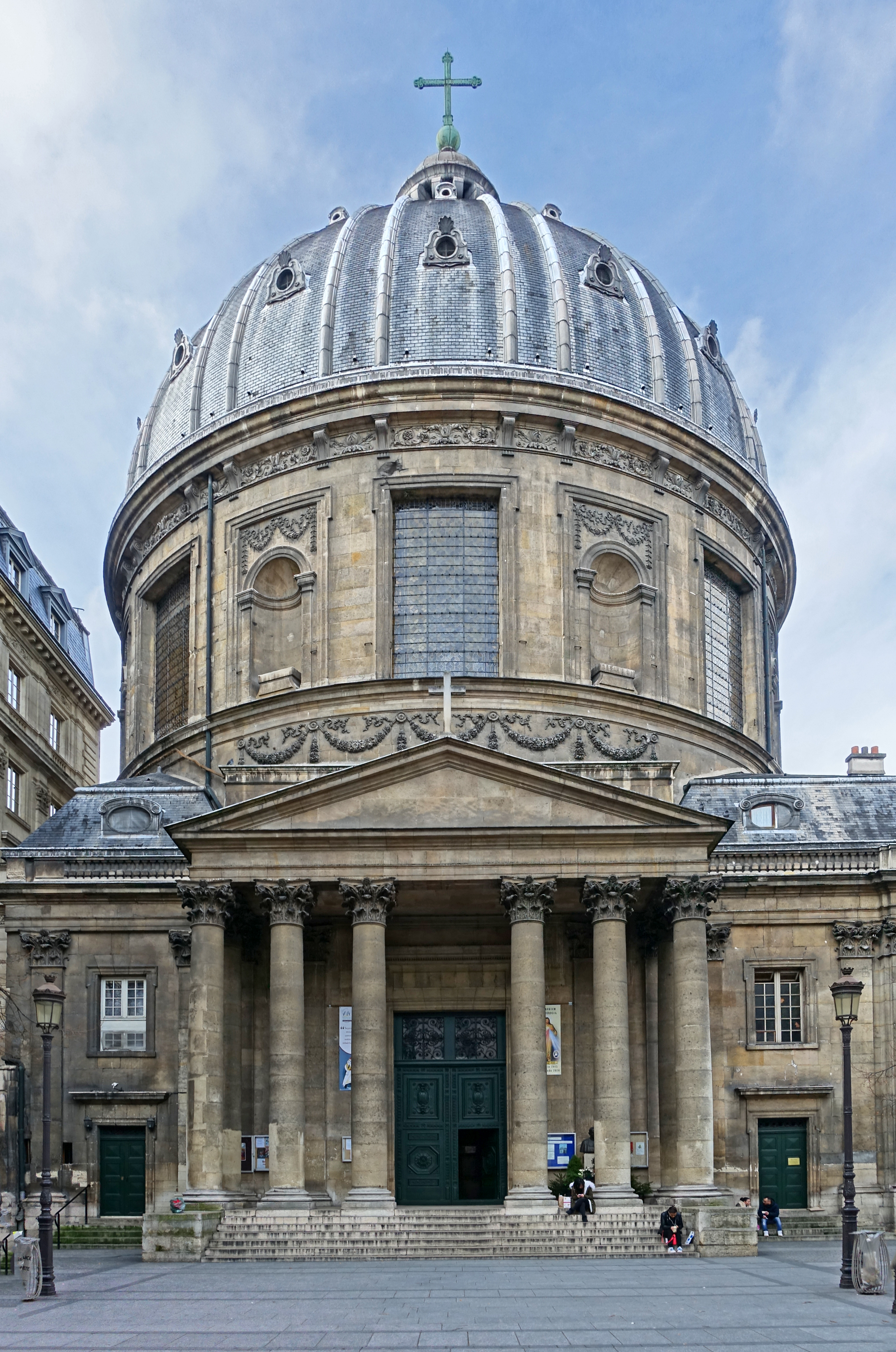
- Notre-Dame-de-l'Assomption, Paris

Religion
- Affiliation: Catholic
- Diocese: Archdiocese of Paris
- Region: Île-de-France
- Rite: Latin Rite
- Status: Active

Location
- Location: Paris, France
- Interactive map of Notre-Dame-de-l'Assomption, Paris

Architecture
- Groundbreaking: 1670
- Completed: 1676

Notre-Dame-de-l'Assomption is a Catholic church in the first arrondissement of Paris, located on Place Maurice-Barrès at the corner of Rue Saint-Honoré and Rue Cambon. It was constructed as a convent church during the reign of Louis XIV between 1670 and 1676 in the Baroque architectural style Since 1844 it has been the main Polish church of Paris. It is known for its collection of Baroque paintings.

== History ==
In 1623, the Cardinal Francois de la Rochefoucauld built a new convent for the sisters of the Order of Haudriettes, then located near the present Hotel de Ville. He placed the new convent on Rue Saint-Honore, next to the city gate of Saint Honoré, on what is now Place Maurice-Barrès. The new congregation was called the Dames of the Assumption.

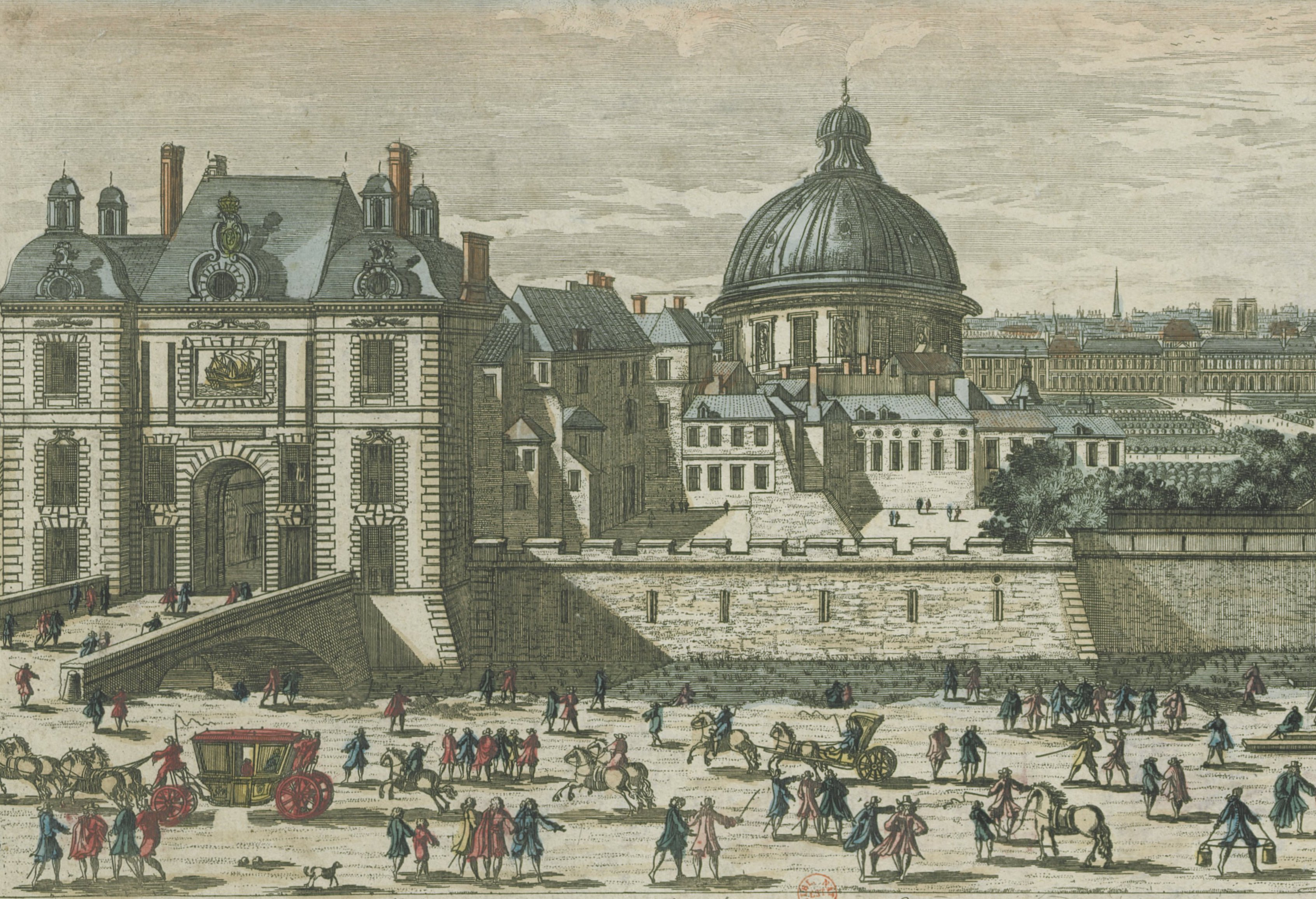
Church and the new city gate of Saint-Honore in the late 1600s

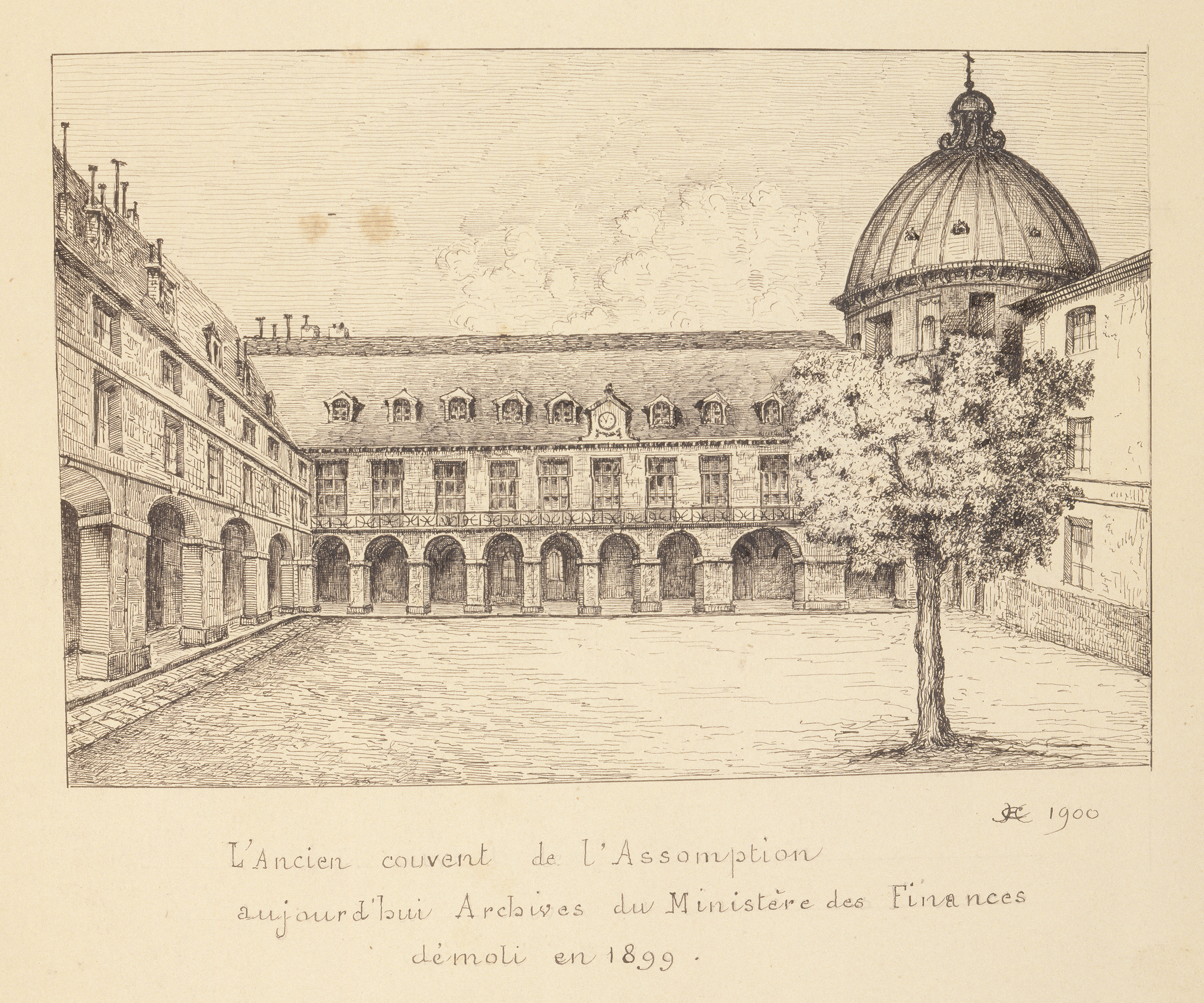
The convent (1600s) was demolished in the 1900s, except for the church

To build the new convent, he obtained more land next to the old chapel and commissioned the architect Charles Errard to design and construct a new church. Errard had studied in Rome, and his design showed the influence of Ancient Rome and the Italian Renaissance.

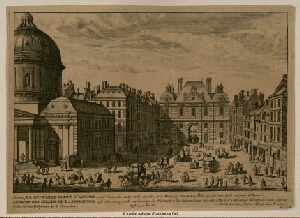
the church in the late 1600s

When his plan was finished, Errard returned to Rome, and delegated the supervision of the construction to a M. Cheret, the director of public works. There were problems and criticism of the finished church, for which Cheret blamed Errard, while Errard blamed Cheret for having modified his plans. The building was finally dedicated on August 14, 1670, by Michel de Poncet de La Riviere, the archbishop of Bourges. The new convent of "Les Dames de l'Assomption" became a refuge into the religious life for well-born women from the Royal Court.

In 1790, during the French Revolution, the convent was closed and declared a public property. and in 1793 it taken over by the Ministry of Finance. The other buildings of the convent were gradually demolished, while the church was used to store opera and theater sets.

In 1802, under the Concordat of 1801 between Napoleon Bonaparte and Pope Pius VII, the church was restored to the Catholic Church. Napoleon declared that it should be the leading church of the 1st arrondissement until the restoration Church of the Madeleine, which was completed in 1842.

On 22 May 1834, the funeral of General Lafayette was held in the church, in the presence of the Garde National and the French parliament.

In 1838, the remains of the clergyman and diplomat Charles Maurice de Talleyrand-Périgord were kept in the church until his tomb was completed.

In 1844, in response to the rapidly-growing number of Polish immigrants in Paris, Denys Affre, Archbishop of Paris, presented the church to the Polish Catholic Church of Paris. The composer Frederic Chopin was a regular visitor between 1830 and 1849.

In 1907 the church was listed as an historical monument.

== Exterior ==
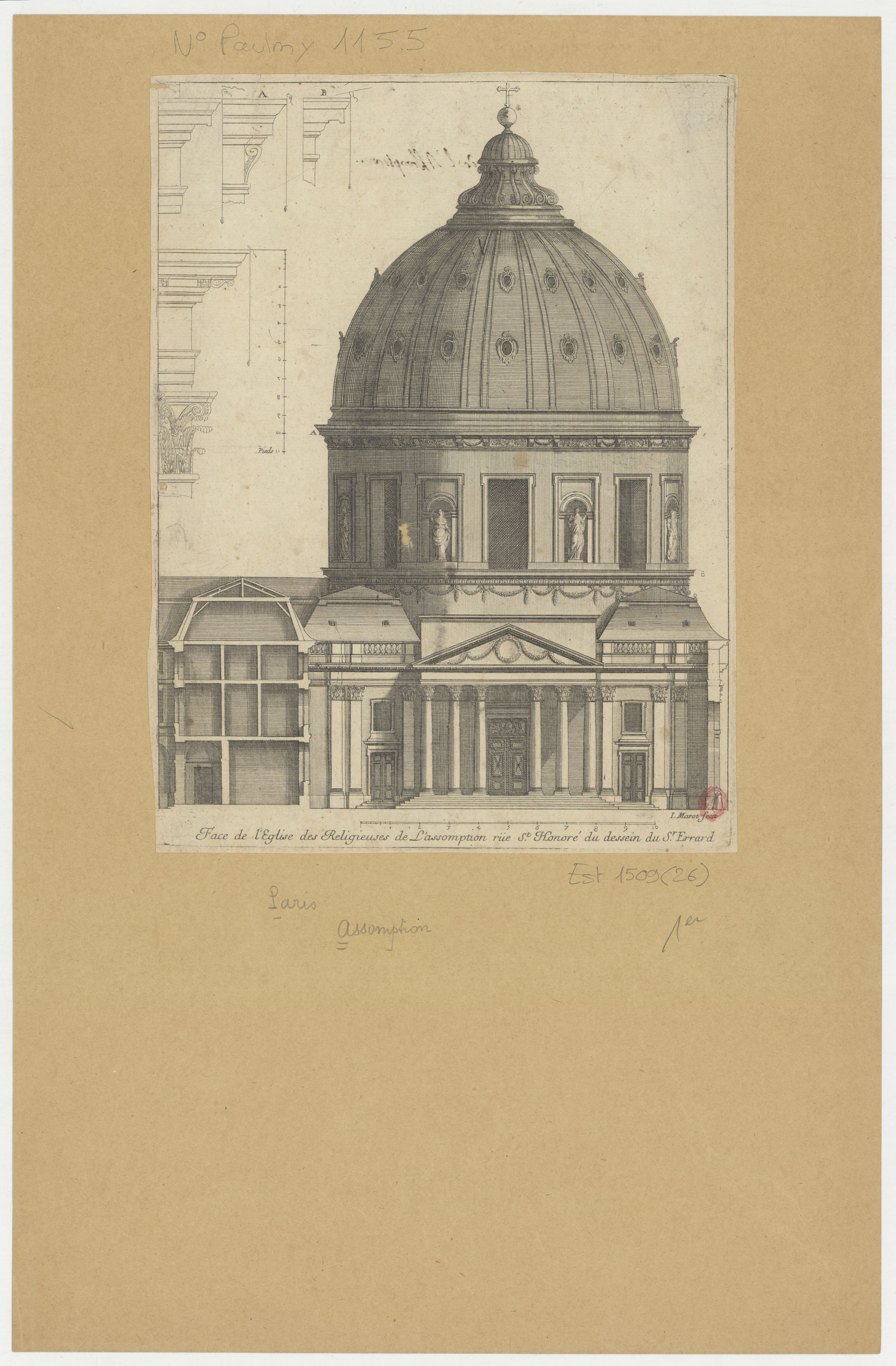
Dome as designed by the architect, Charles Errard (1679)

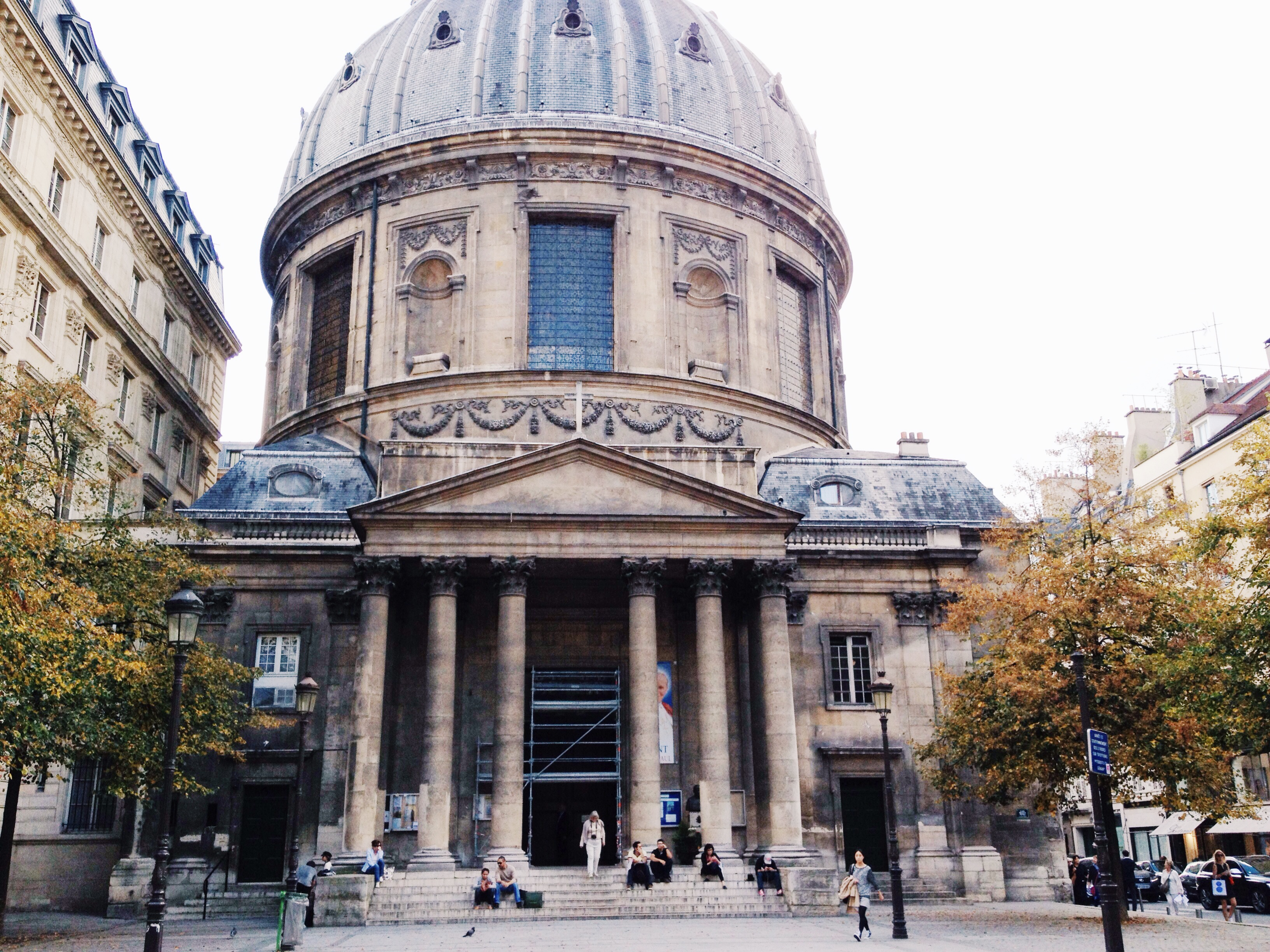
The porch and dome

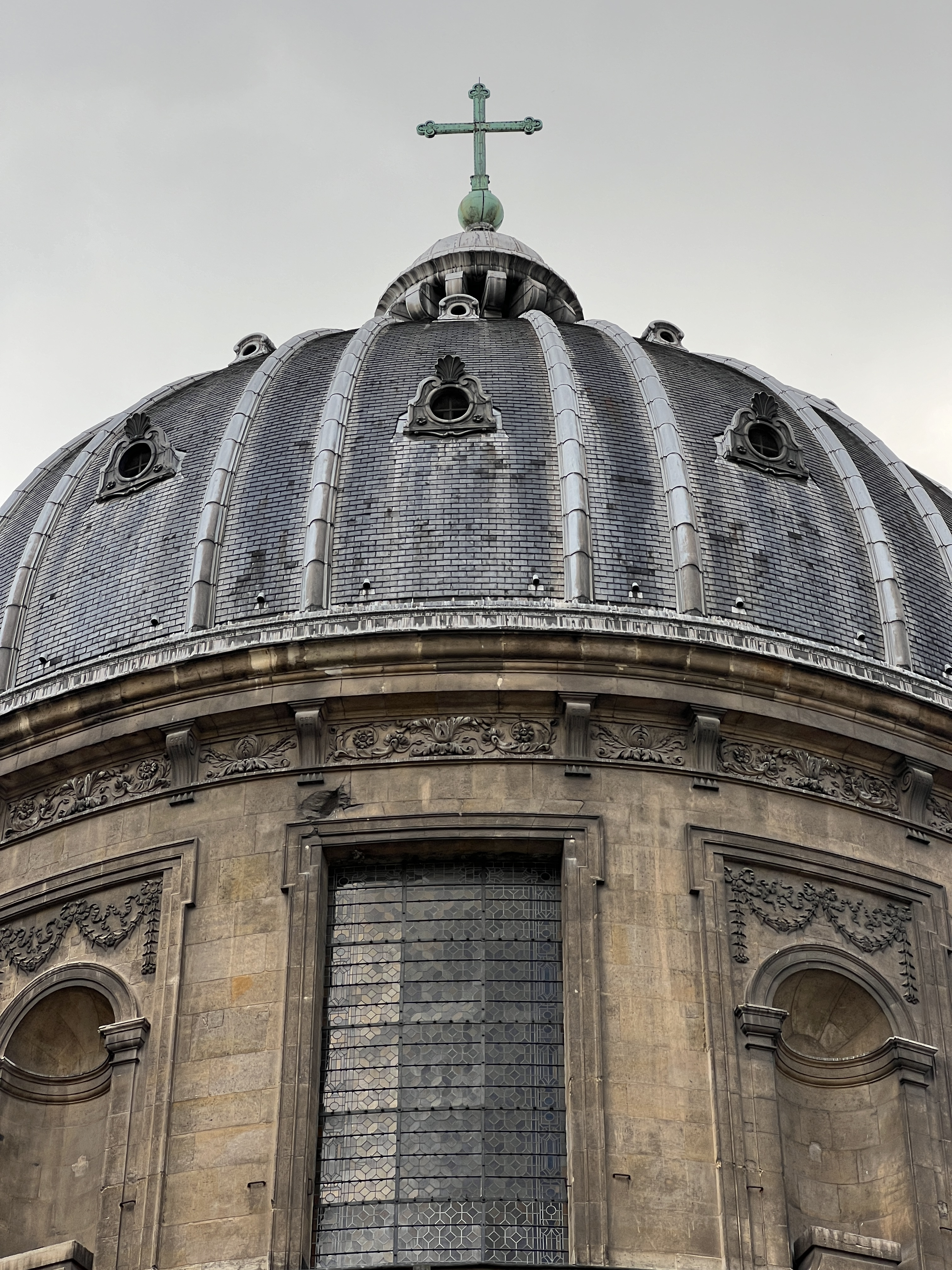
Top of the dome

The facade of the church has a porch with six classical Corinthian columns, similar to that of the north porch of the Sorbonne, built about the same time. The rotonda is 24 meters in diameter, with simple pilasters in the lower portion. It is topped by a cupola, divided into eight bays, each with a statue. The facade is decorated with a bust of Pope John-Paul II.

== Interior ==
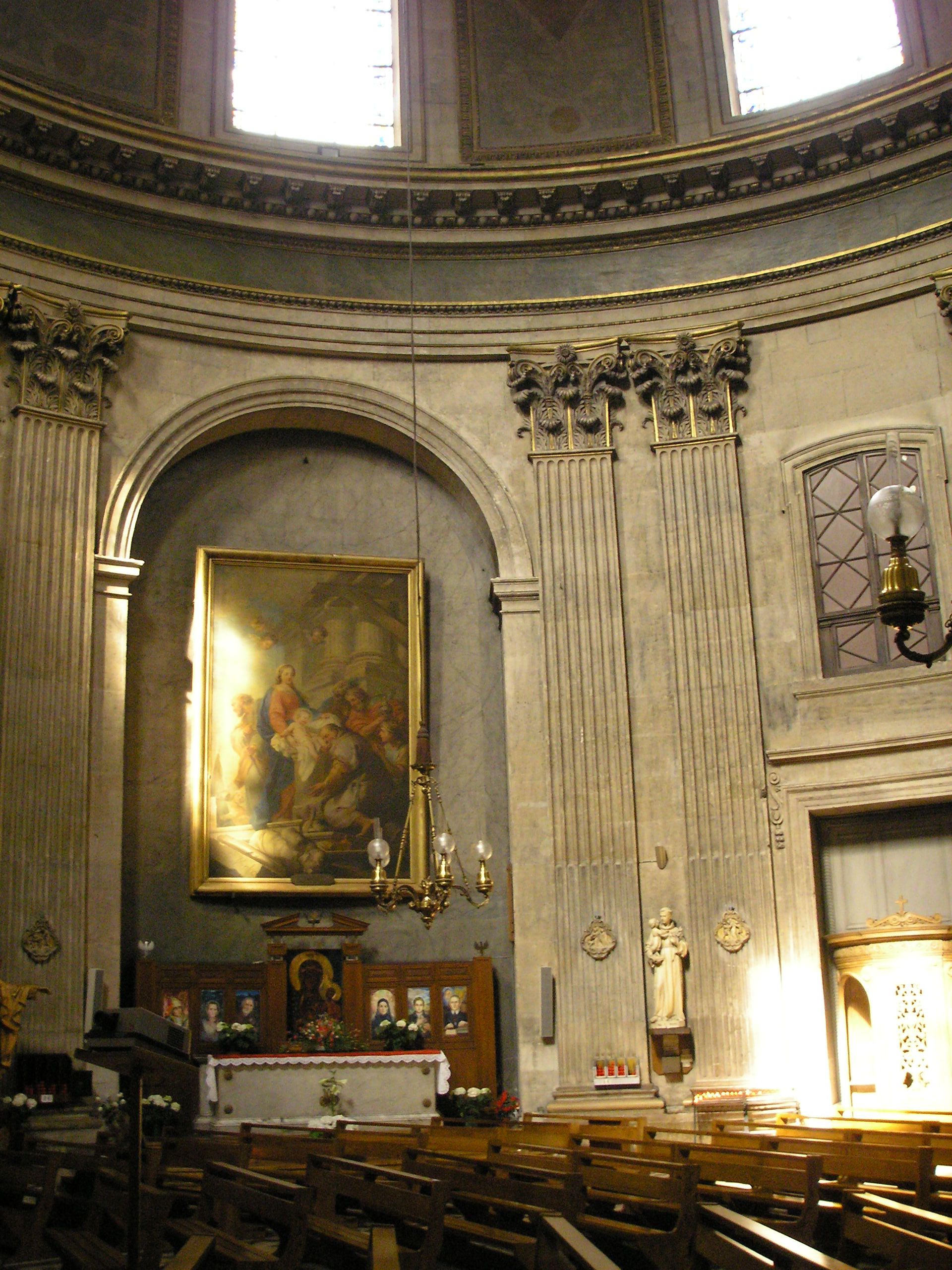
A chapel

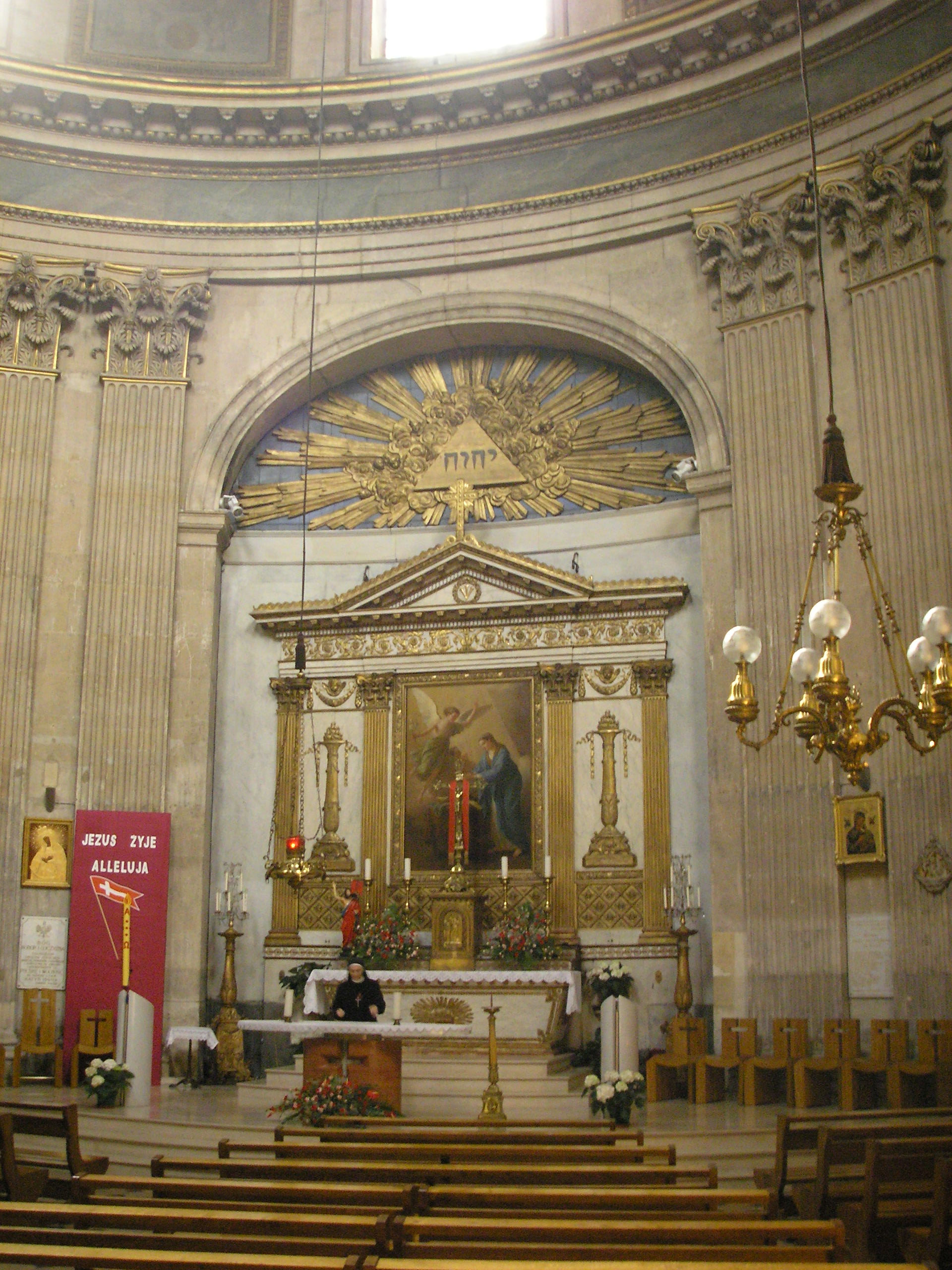
The Altar

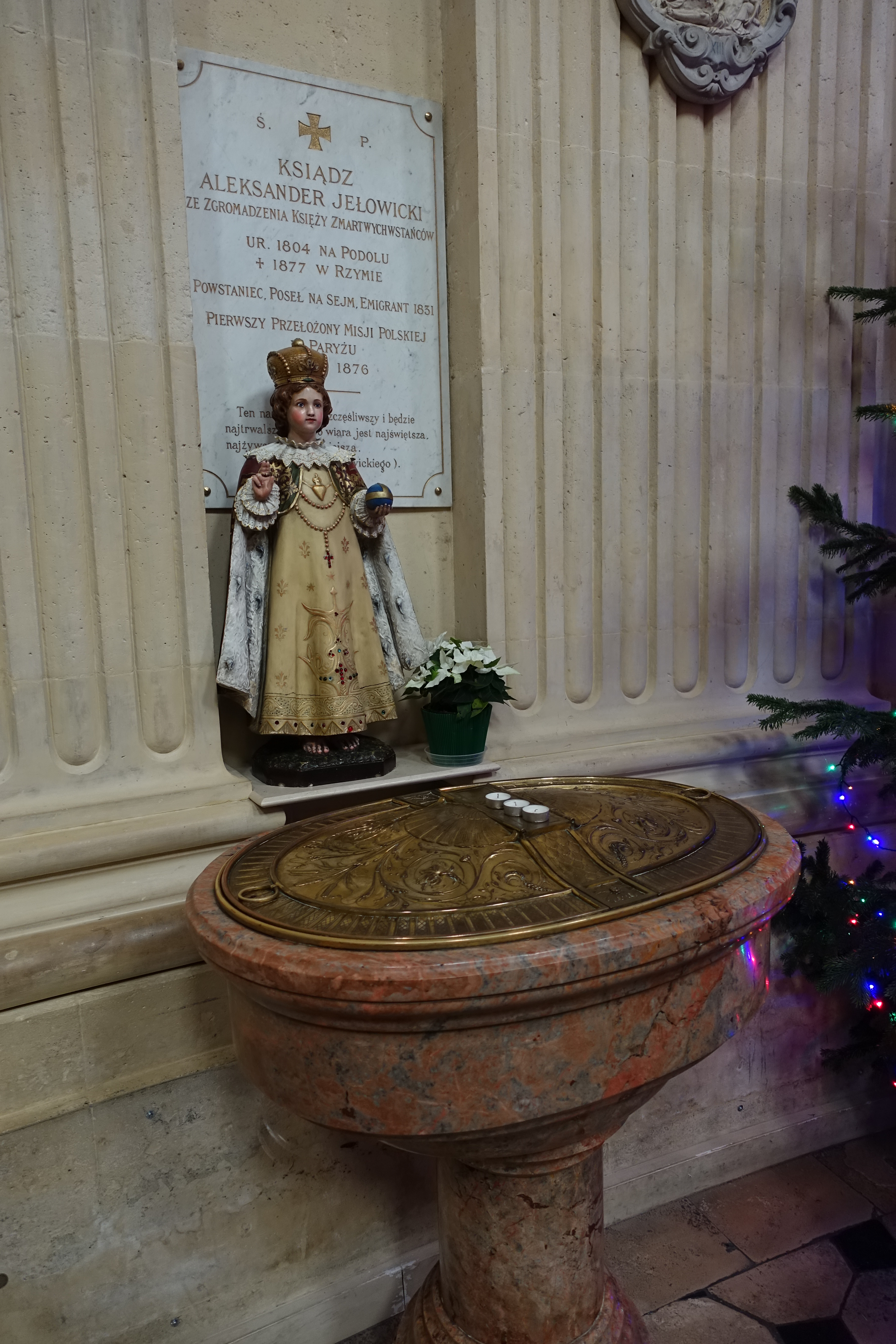
The Baptismal font, with porcelain statue of the Infant Jesus.

The nave of the church is round, covered by the dome, and is twenty-four meters in diameter. The dome is supported by eight groups of Pilasters with Corinthian columns On the upper level are eight high windows, separated by panels of moulded stucco. The windows are composed largely of white glass, with coloured glass on the edges. Behind the altar of portraits of major figures from the Polish Roman Catholic Church.

The baptismal font is topped by a colourful porcelain statue of the Infant Jesus.

== Art and decoration ==
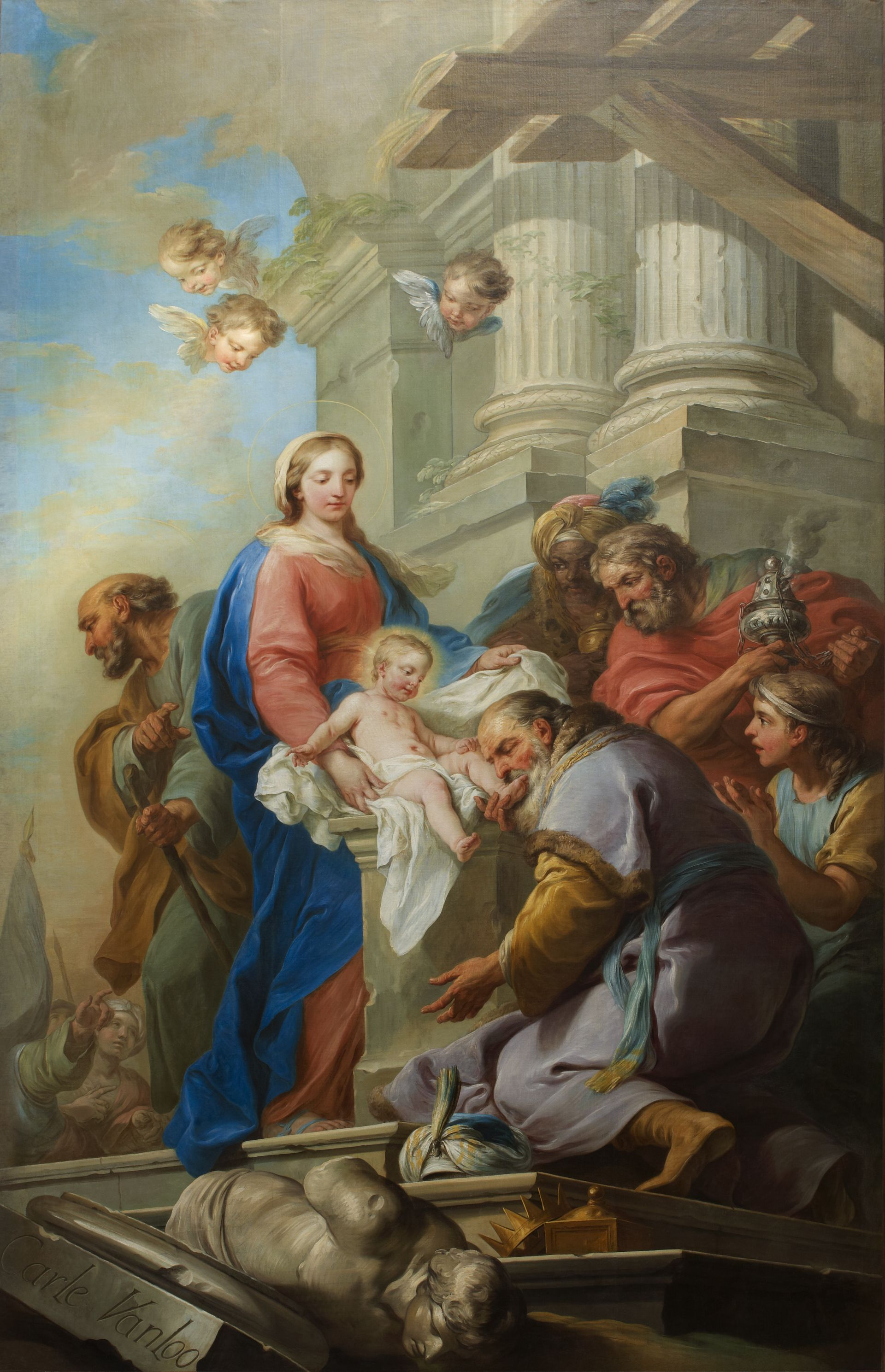
"Adoration of the Magi" by Carle Van Loo (1739)

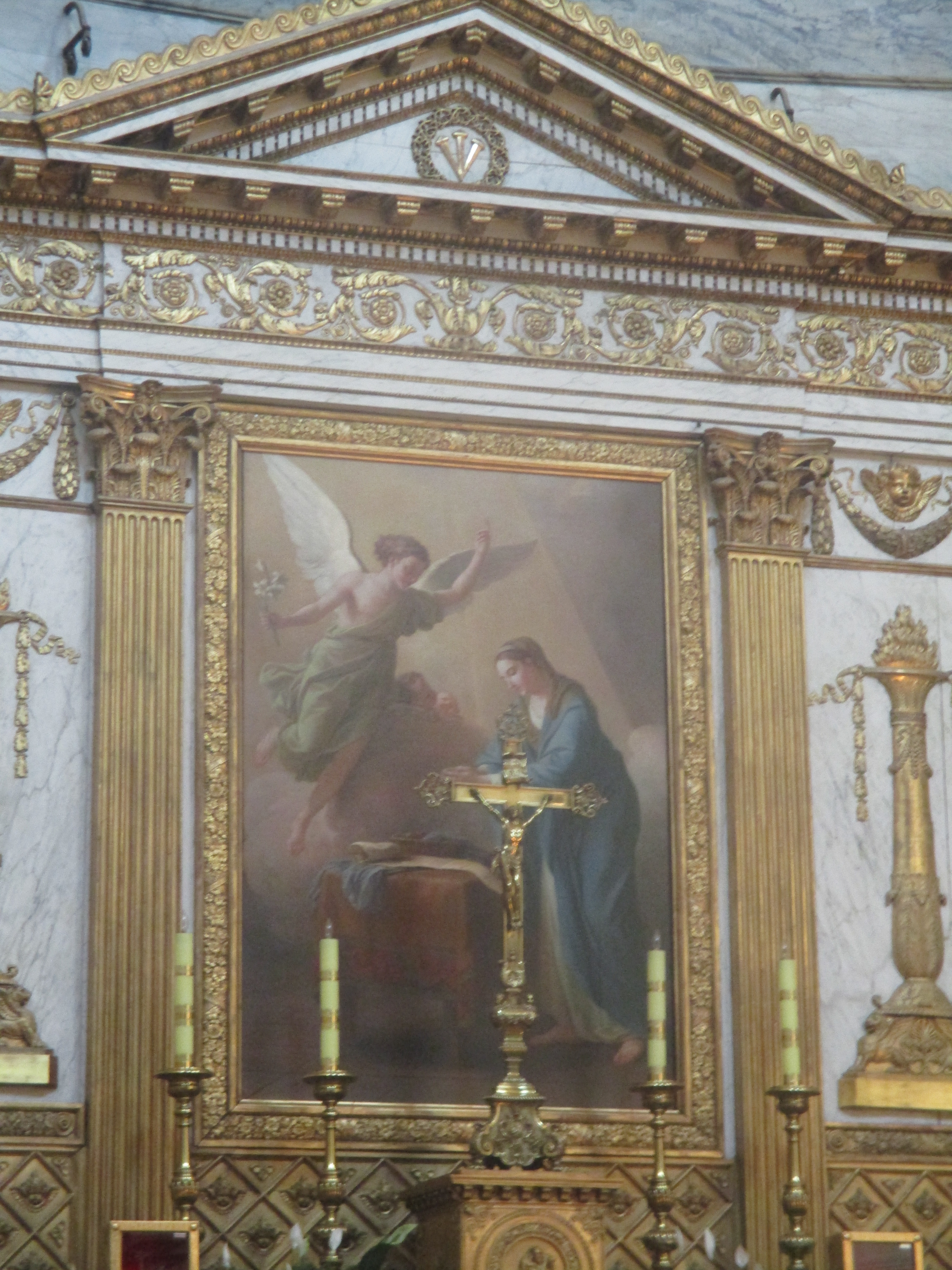
Altar painting, “The Annunciation” by Joseph-Marie Vien

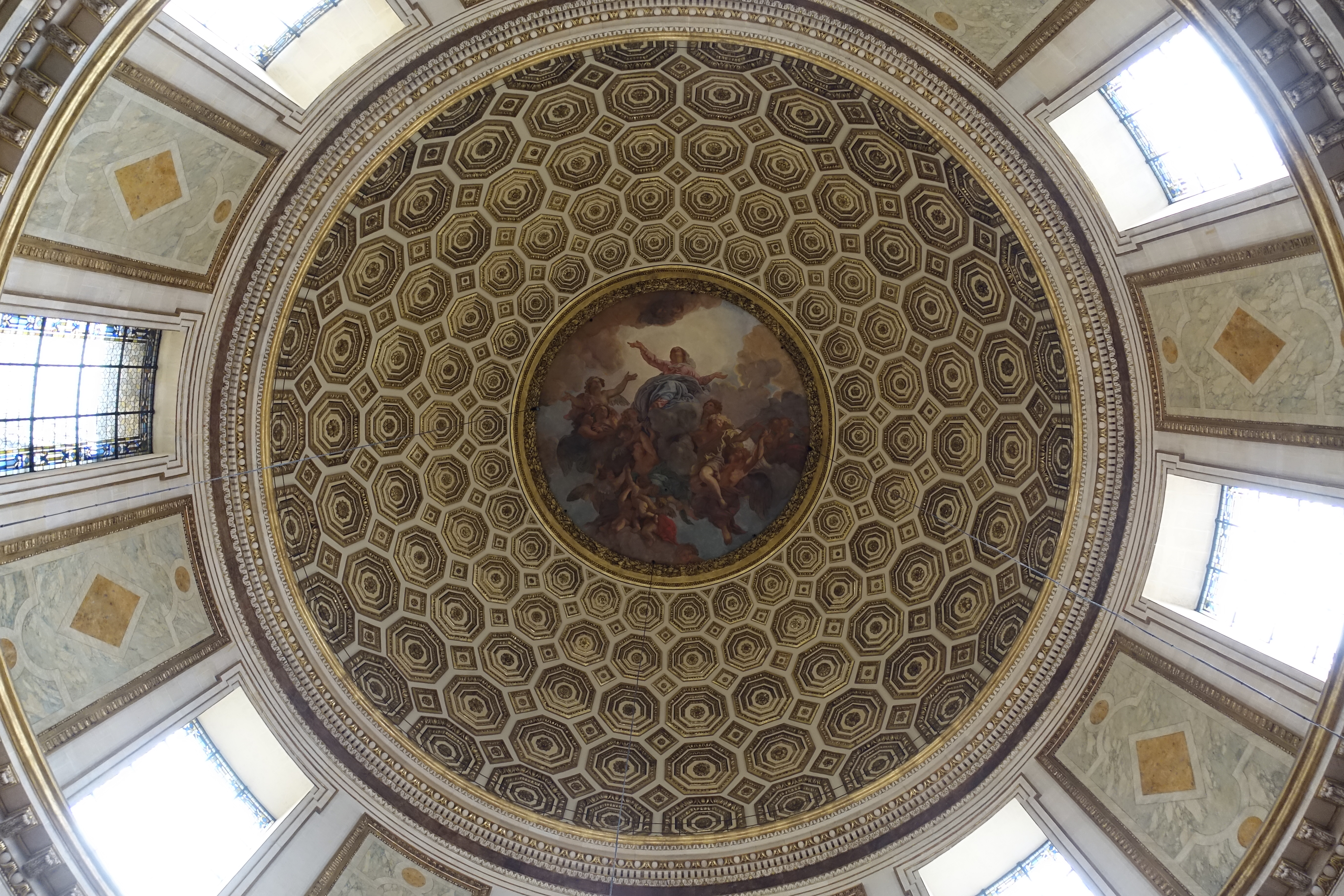
Interior of the dome, with painting of "The Assumption of Mary" by Charles de La Fosse

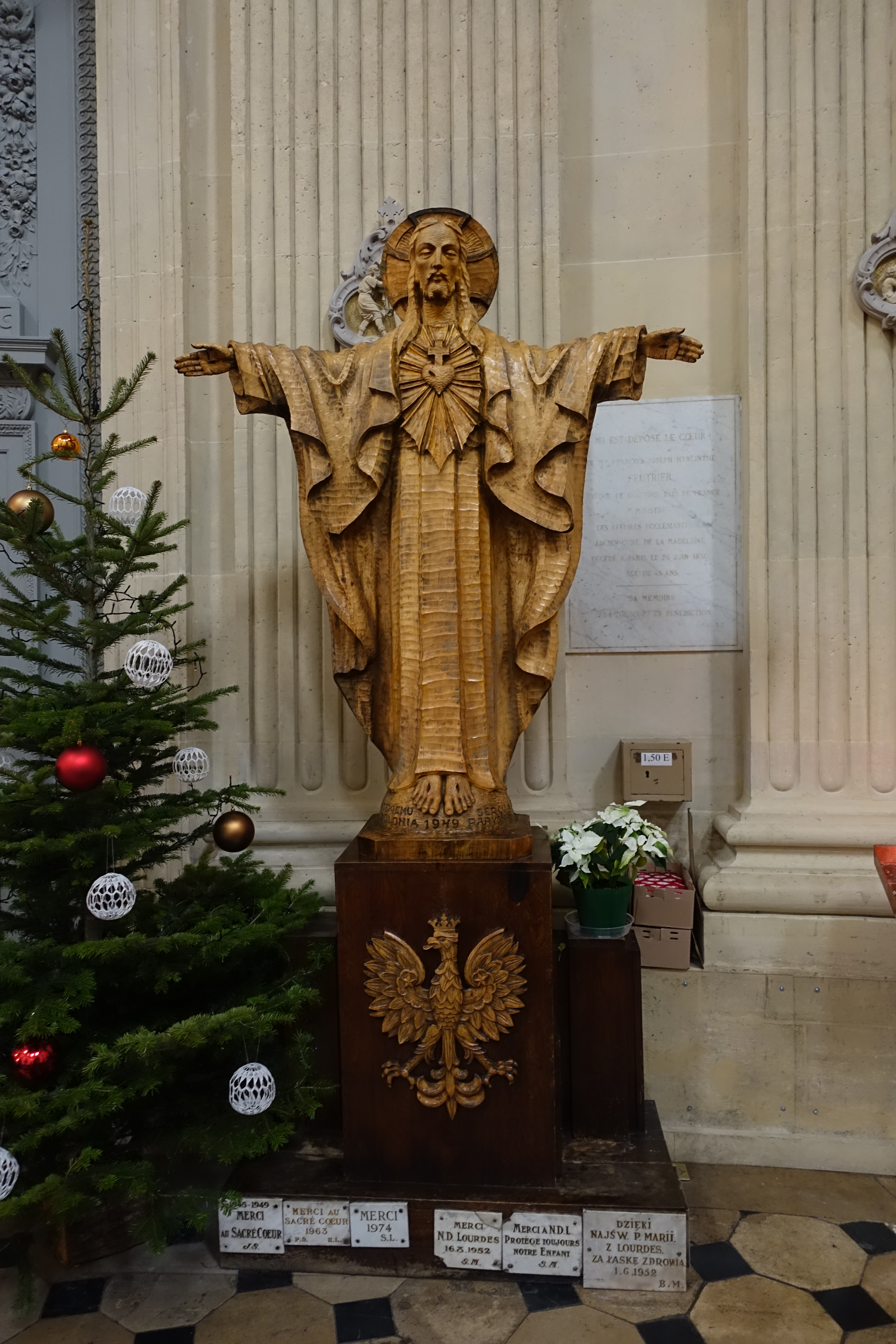
Sculpture of Christ above a Polish emblem

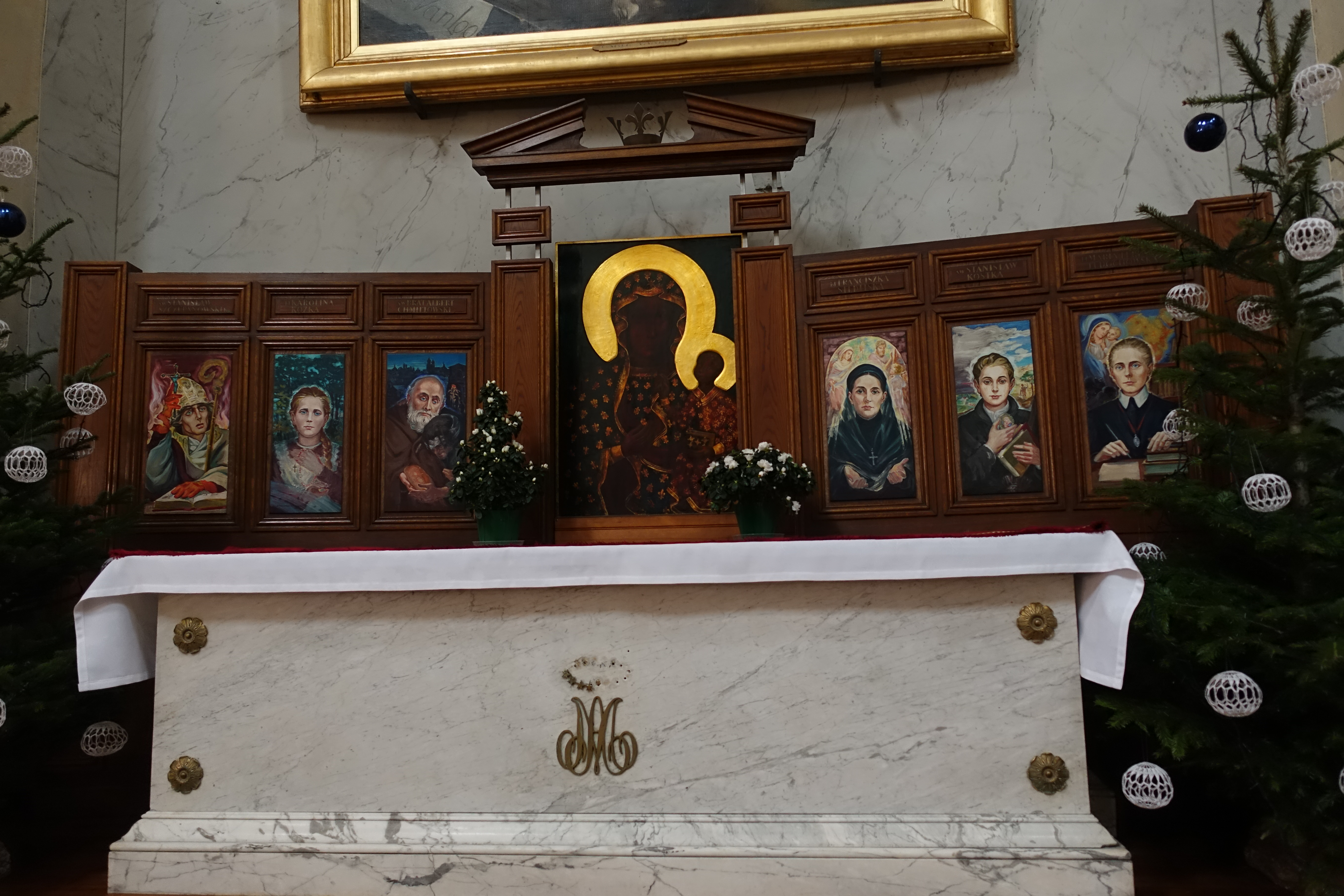
The Madonna and Polish saints

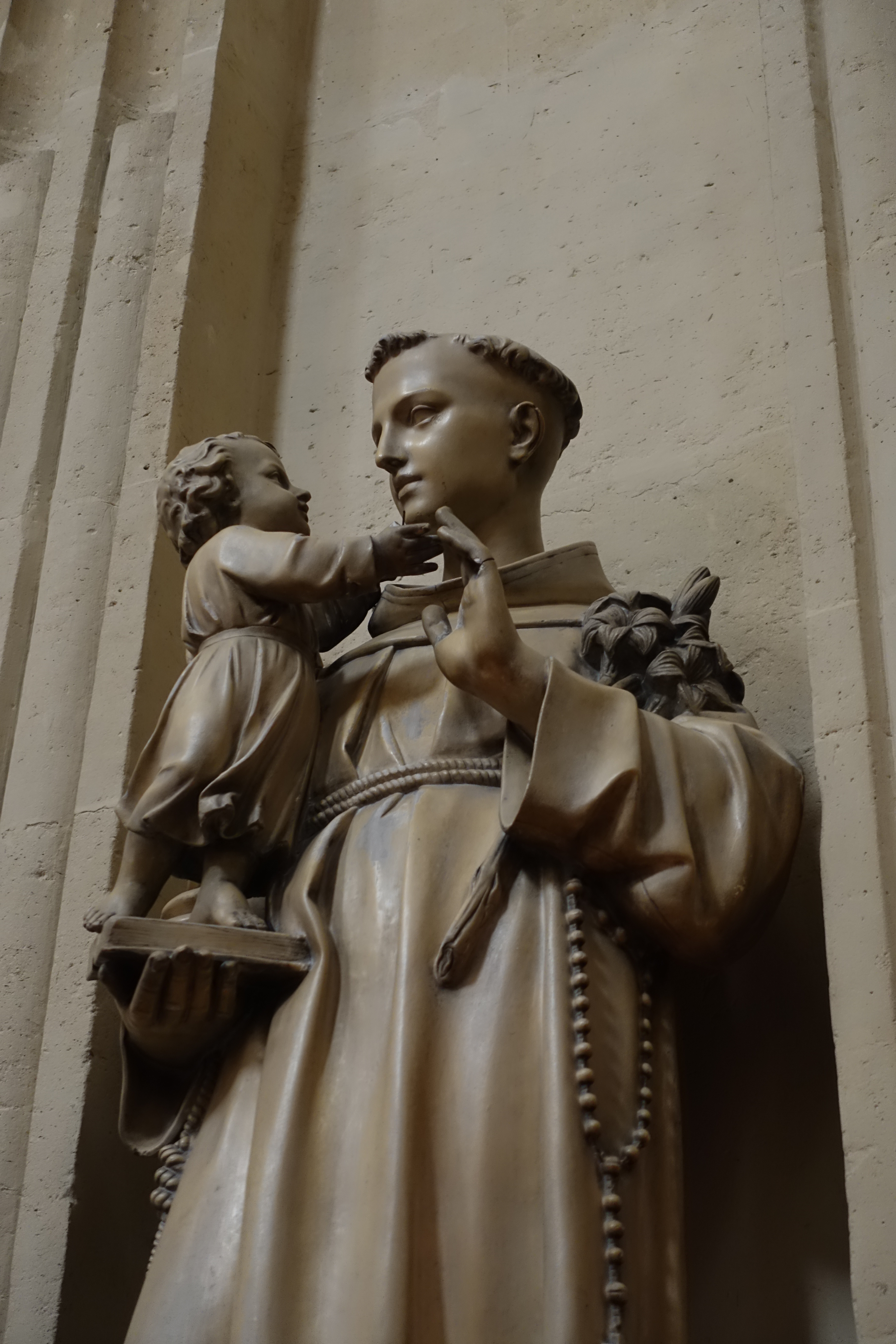
Saint Anthony of Padua

== The church organ ==
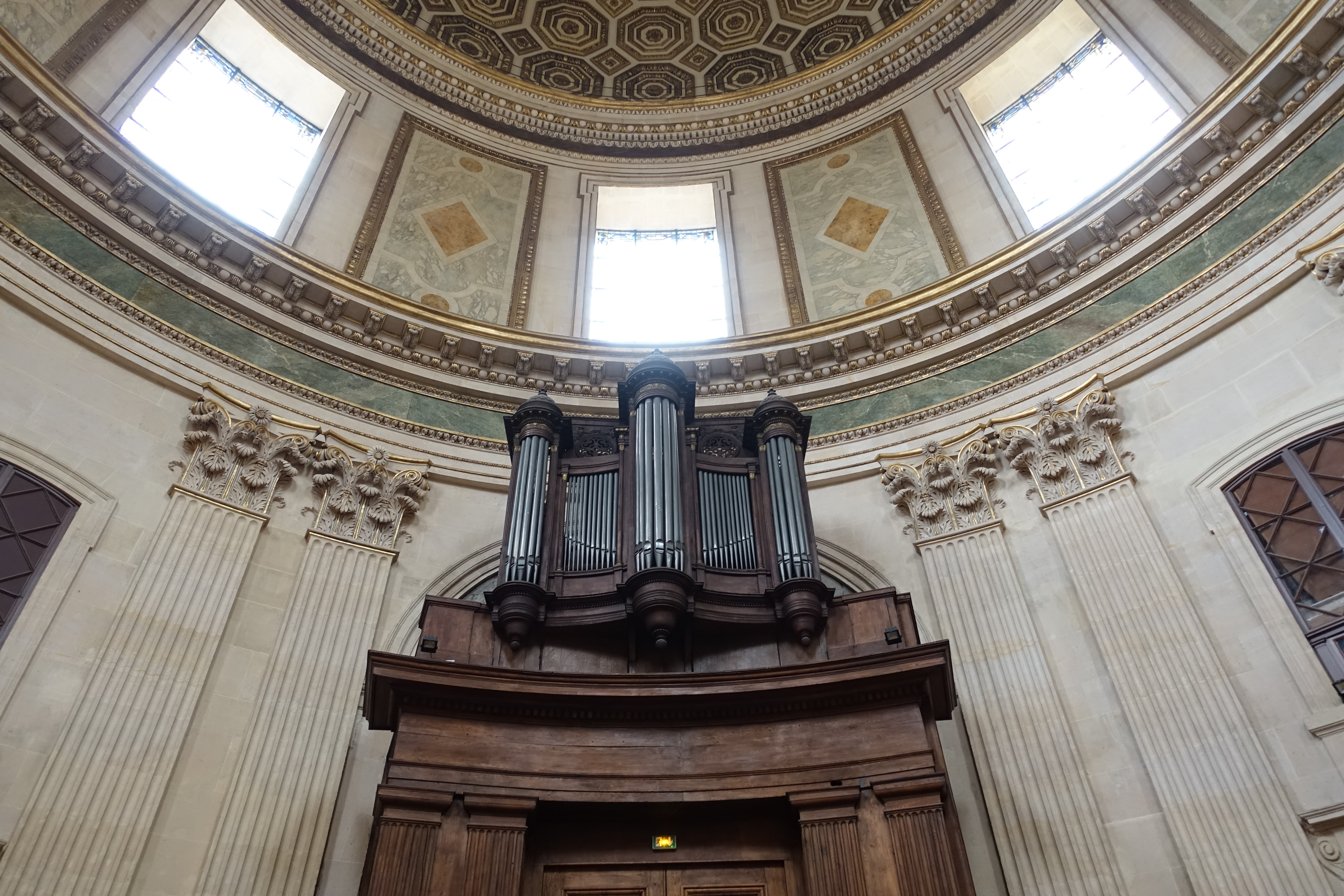
The organ, placed over the portal in the apse

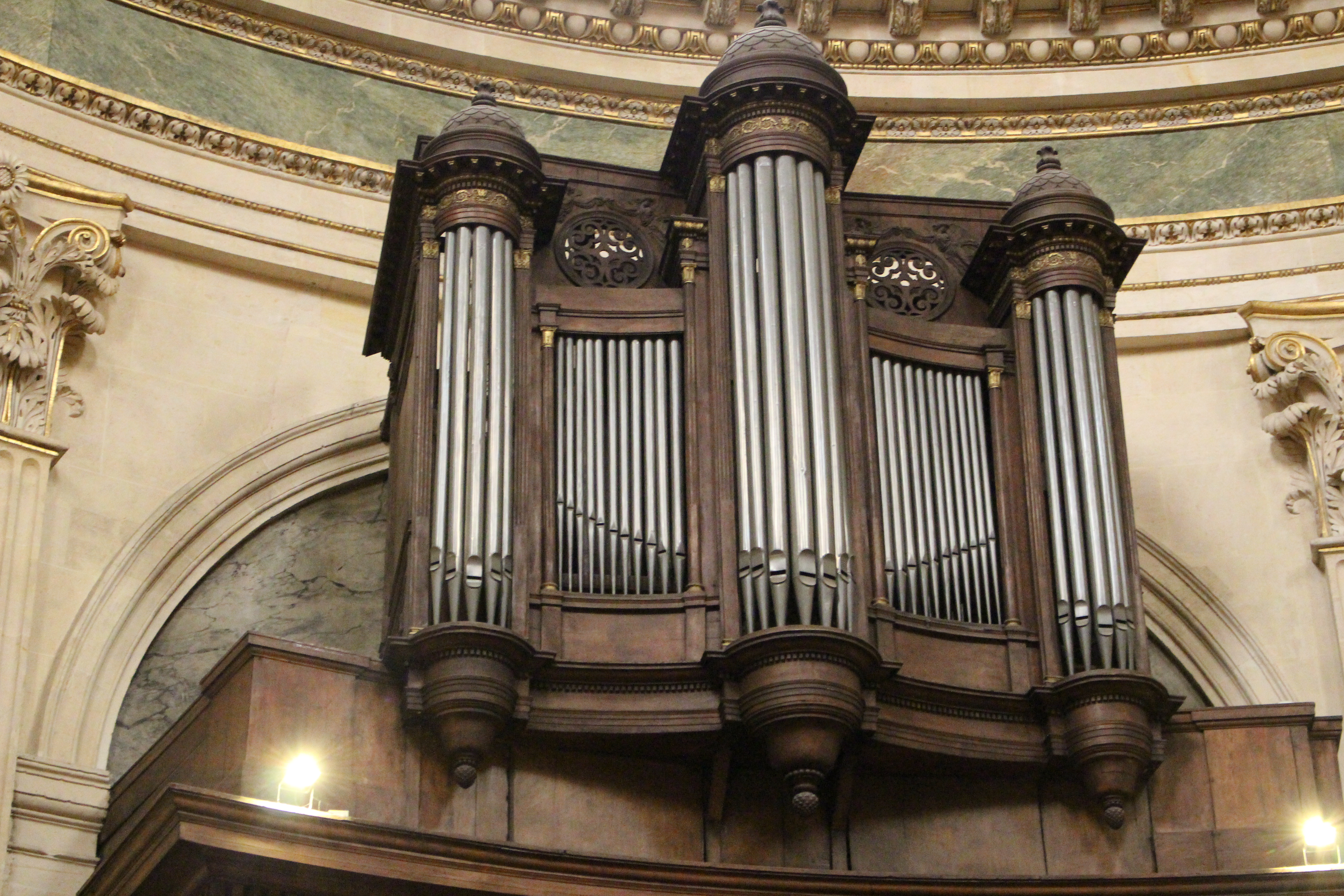
Organ built by Aristide Cavaillé-Coll

The organ dates from the end of the 19th century. It was made by the prominent organ-builder, Aristide Cavaillé-Coll. His other organs included the Saint-Denis Basilica (1841), Église de la Madeleine, (1859), Saint-Sulpice church, and Notre-Dame Cathedral

1st Manual	2nd Manual	Pedals	
Grand Orgue (GO) ("Great Organ")	Récit Expressif (RE) (Swell)	Pédalier	Accouplements
Cromorne 8'	Clairon 4'	Flûte 4'	RE / GO 8'
Plein Jeu IV rangs	Trompette 8'	Basse 8'	RE / GO 16'
Doublette 2'	Tierce 1' 3/5	Soubasse 16'	(Tirasse) RE / Pédale
Prestant 4'	Nasard 2' 2/3	Quintaton 32'	(Tirasse) GO / Pédale
Flûte Harmonique 8'	Flageolet 2'		
Bourdon 8'	Flûte 4'		
Montre 8'	Cor de Nuit 8'		
Bourdon 16'	RE 16'		

== See also ==
- Great Emigration
- Polish Catholic Mission
- List of historic churches in Paris
