= Zita =

Italian saint

Saint Zita of Lucca
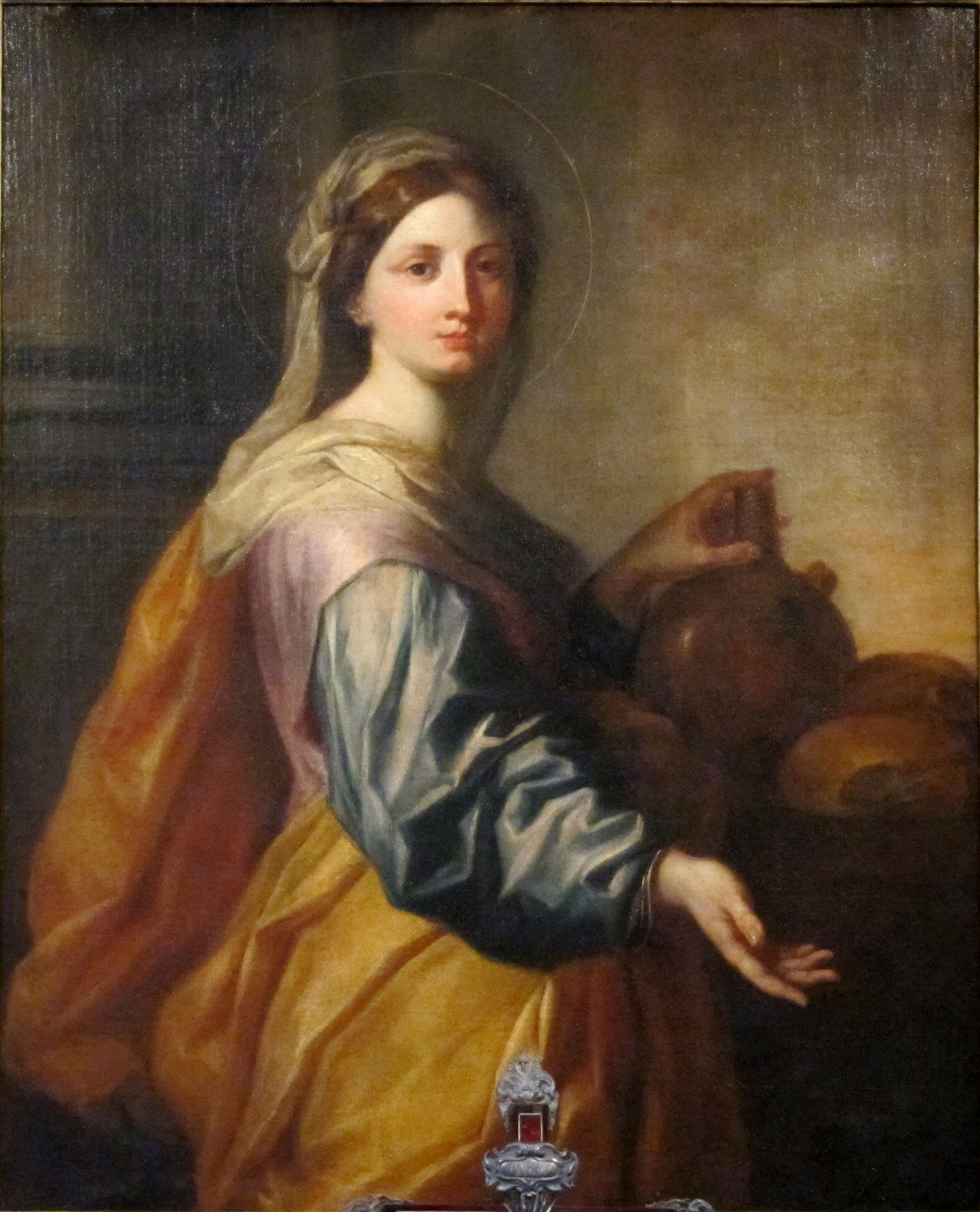
- Arnould de Vuez, Sainte Zite (1696), Hospice Comtesse

Virgin
- Born: c. 1212; Monte Sagrati, near Lucca, Italy
- Died: April 27, 1272 (aged 59–60); Lucca, Italy
- Venerated in: Catholic Church
- Canonized: 5 September 1696 (confirmation of cult) by Pope Innocent XII
- Major shrine: Basilica di San Frediano, Lucca
- Feast: 27 April
- Attributes: depicted with a bag, keys
- Patronage: Domestic servants, homemakers, lost keys, people ridiculed for their piety, single laywomen, waiters, waitresses, Lucca

Zita (c. 1212 – 27 April 1272), also known as Sitha or Citha, is an Italian saint, the patroness saint of maids and domestic servants. She is often appealed to in order to help find lost keys.

Zita commenced her employment in domestic service at the age of 12 and dedicated nearly five decades to serving the same family.

== Life ==
Zita was born in Tuscany in Monte Sagrati, a village not far from Lucca. Her parents were Giovanni and Buonissima Lombardo. Her maternal uncle, Graziano, was a hermit who dwelt on a neighbouring mountain where he had built a church and a shelter for travellers.

At the age of 12, Zita became a servant in the household of the Fatinellis, a wealthy family of silk merchants. Signora Fatinelli allowed Zita to attend school for a year and then put her to be trained under an older maid. The other servants did not care for Zita. They interpreted her piety as posturing, her submissiveness as stupidity.

By her meek and humble self-restraint, Zita succeeded in overcoming the malice of her fellow-servants. She gave a third of her wages to her parents, kept a third, and gave the rest to the poor. The mistress of the house placed Zita in charge of the household almsgiving, and allowed her to visit the sick poor in their own homes and tend to their needs. A small room isolated from the rest of the house was put at Zita's disposal. She would venture out in the evenings and invite poor homeless women to supper. The room, which had a bed, was offered as safe shelter for the night.

She always rose hours before the rest of the family and took care to hear Mass every morning before she began work. She attended to her tasks with diligence and fidelity, and studied when possible to anticipate what needed to be done. Signora Fatinelli's dying wish was that Zita be placed in charge of the household. She continued to serve the family after the death of Guglielmo Fatinelli in 1260, when his son Pagano became the head of the family.

== Legends associated with the saint ==
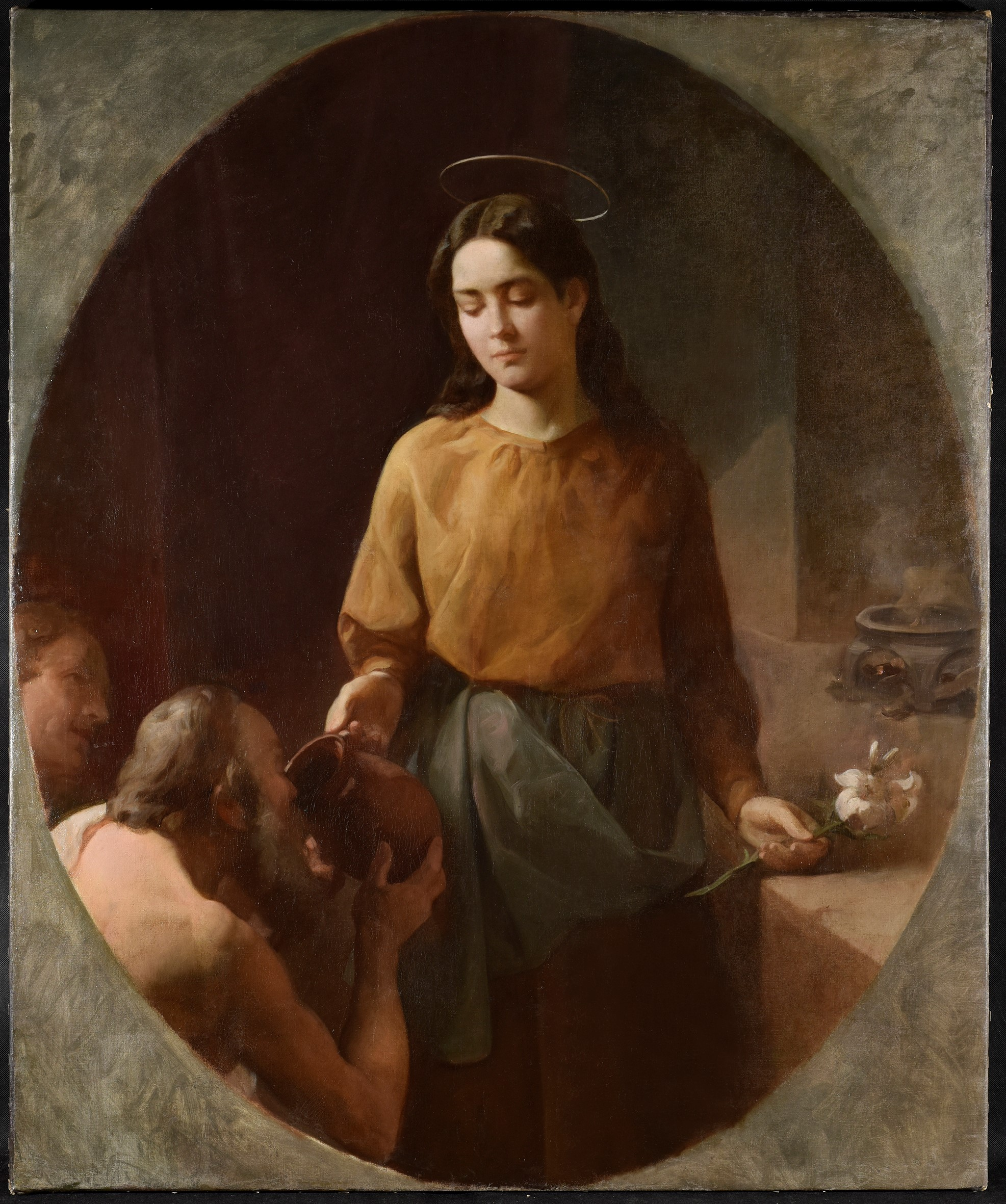
Leon Biedroński, Saint Zita (1889), St. Anne's Church, Warsaw

Zita is sometimes depicted in art carrying bread for the poor in her cloak. Jealous servants reported this to the master, who confronted her. Upon opening the cloak, however, it was found to be full of flowers. A similar tale is told of Elizabeth of Hungary. Zita gave away her own food during a famine, and then gave away food belonging to her master. When he remonstrated with her, the pantry was discovered to be fully stocked.

There are various versions of the miracle of the loaves. On one morning, Zita left her chore of baking bread either to tend to someone in need (or was deep in prayer in her room). She returned to find loaves all ready set and prepared in the kneading-trough (or already baked). Neither the other servants nor the mistress knew who had prepared the bread, so it was commonly attributed to angels.

On another occasion, Zita was returning from distributing alms when she encountered a beggar. Having nothing left to give him, she accompanied him to the village well to draw him a cool drink. She let a copper jug down into the well, and in the act of holding it out to him, made the sign of the cross over the water, praying that this drink might be blessed to the poor wayfarer. As he made to drink, he found that the water had turned into wine.

== Death and veneration ==
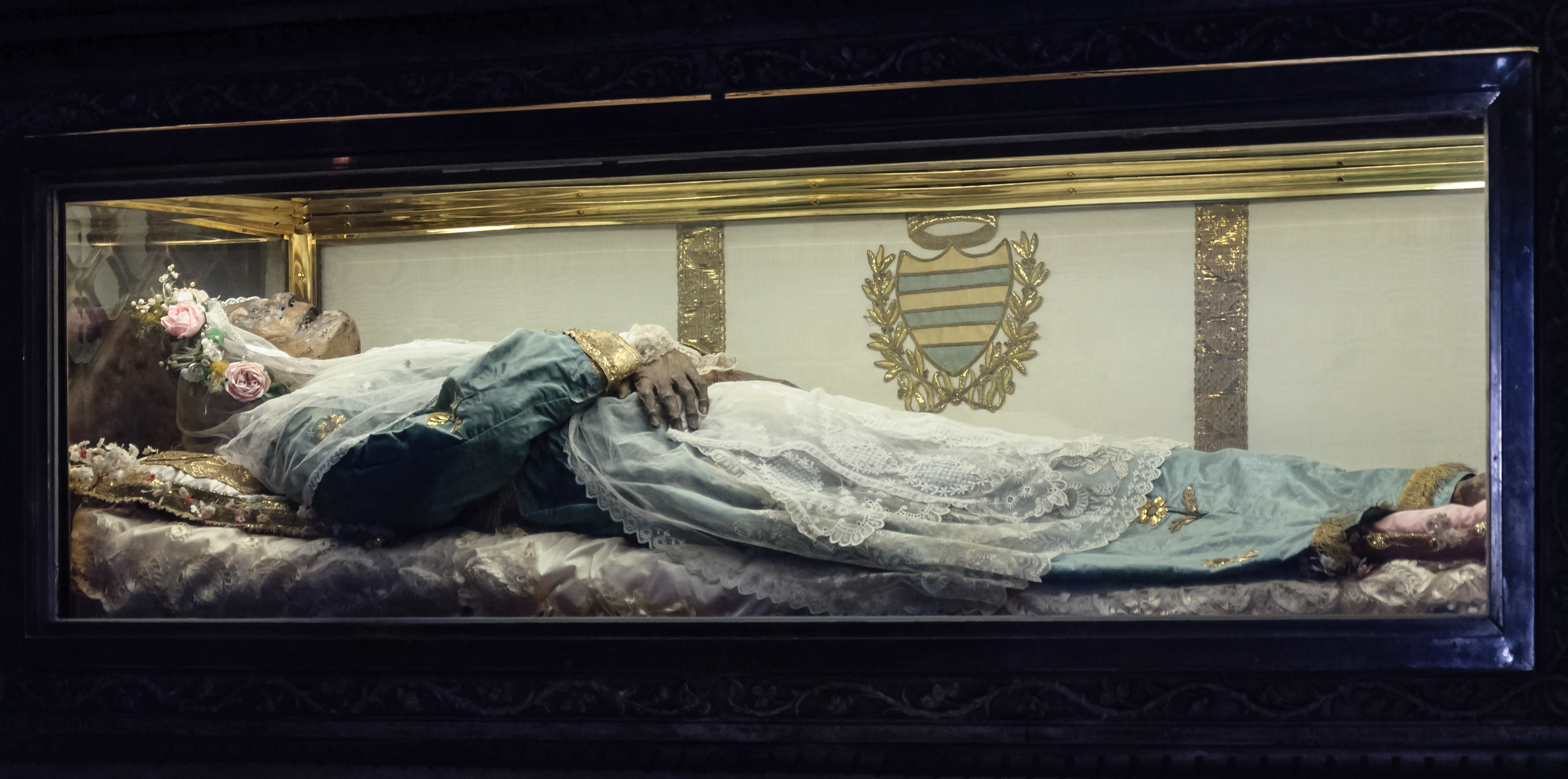
The mummified body of Zita, kept in the Basilica di San Frediano in Lucca

Zita died peacefully in the Fatinelli house on April 27, 1272, aged 60. It is said that a star appeared above the attic where she slept at the moment of her death. She had served and edified the family for 48 years, and had become practically venerated by the family. After 150 miracles had been attributed to Zita's intercession and recognized by the church, she was canonized in 1696. Soon after Zita's death a popular cult grew up around her, centering on the Basilica of San Frediano in Lucca. Each year on April 27, the people of Lucca bake bread and bring flowers to San Frediano in celebration of her feast day.

Zita was exhumed in 1580, and discovered to be incorrupt. The body is on display for public veneration in the Basilica di San Frediano in Lucca.

Guilds were established in St Zita's honour to provide homes for servants who were temporarily out of work, to care for those aged or incurably ill, and to provide terms of long service.

During the late medieval era, St Zita's popular cult had grown throughout Europe. In England she was known as Sitha, and was popularly invoked by maidservants and housewives, particularly in event of having lost keys, or when crossing rivers or bridges. Images of St Zita exist in churches across southern England. However, despite the gaining popularity, especially amongst women at this time, the cult was not an official one.

Pope Leo X sanctioned a liturgical cult within the church in the early 16th century, which was confirmed upon her canonization in 1696 by Pope Innocent XII. In 1748, Pope Benedict XIV added her name to the Roman Martyrology.

In 2022, Zita was officially added to the Episcopal Church liturgical calendar with a feast day on 27 April.

== Patronage and legacy ==
Zita is the patroness saint of domestic workers, housekeepers, waitresses, and household chores. Her feast day is 27 April. From 1890 to 2000 St. Zita's Home for Friendless Women in Manhattan provided food, clothing, shelter, and job training for destitute women.

== Sources ==
- Doyno, Mary Harvey (2019). The Lay Saint: Charity and Charismatic Authority in Medieval Italy, 1150–1350. Cornell University Press. ISBN 978-15017-4-021-3.
- Farmer, David Hugh (1997). The Oxford Dictionary of Saints. Oxford; New York: Oxford University Press. ISBN 978-0-19-280058-9.
