= The Home of the Friendless =

- Home of the Friendless
- U.S. National Register of Historic Places
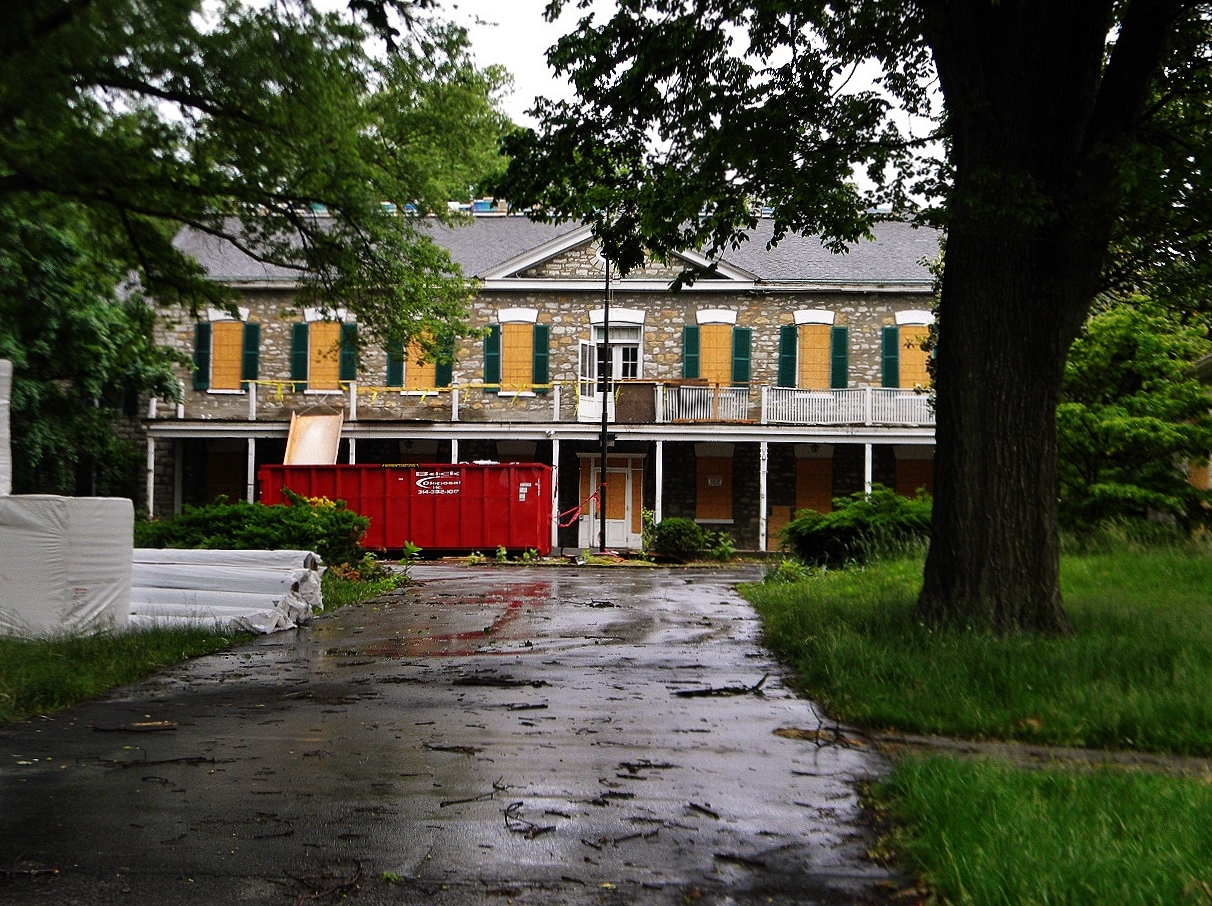
- Home of the Friendless, c. 2016

- Location within Missouri
- Location: 4431 South Broadway; St. Louis, Missouri
- Coordinates: 38.575301°N 90.235102°W
- Built: c. 1850 – 1995
- Architectural style: Classical Revival
- NRHP reference No.: 15000773
- Added to NRHP: November 9, 2015

The Home of the Friendless is a building in St. Louis, Missouri, listed on the National Register of Historic Places. It was acquired by Charlotte Charless in 1853 to house "destitute and suffering females", focusing on elderly women and widows with no means of support, and served in that role for over 160 years.

The Home was described in 1882 as an "institution for friendless old ladies", on what was then Carondelet Road. An 1869 court case addressed whether it could be taxed.

The Missouri Advisory Council on Historic Preservation considered it for National Register listing in 2015.

In 1847, a "Home for the Friendless" was built in New York City.

== See also ==
- National Register of Historic Places listings in St. Louis south and west of downtown
