= Dominican Sisters of Hope =

The Dominican Sisters of Hope formed in 1995 from the merger of three Dominican congregations: the Dominican Sisters of the Most Holy Rosary of Newburgh, New York (1883), the Dominican Sisters of St. Catherine of Siena (1891) of Fall River, Massachusetts, and the Dominican Sisters of the Sick Poor (1910) of Ossining, NY. They sponsor Mount Saint Mary College in Newburgh and Mariandale Retreat Center in Ossining. The Sisters minister in healthcare in New York City, and in education, social service and pastoral ministries.

== History ==
=== Dominican Sisters of Newburgh ===
In 1853 four Dominican Sisters from the convent of the Holy Cross in Regensburg, Germany arrived in Williamsburg. In 1869, the Convent of the Holy Rosary on Second Street in Lower Manhattan separated from the Brooklyn motherhouse. In 1883, at the invitation of Father Michael J. Phelan, pastor of St. Mary's Parish, the sisters traveled to Newburgh, New York and opened Mount Saint Mary Academy, which later became Mount Saint Mary College. In 1883, the sisters of the Convent of the Holy Rosary on Second Street moved their motherhouse to Newburgh. In 1886, when St. Mary's parish school was opened, the sisters took charge of that as well.

In 1973, the sisters formally separated the college from the congregation.

=== Dominican Sisters of St. Catherine of Siena ===
In 1891 several Dominican sisters move to Fall River, Massachusetts and founded the Dominican Sisters of St. Catherine of Siena to serve the many French-Canadian immigrants. The sisters taught at Dominican Academy in Fall River, at Bishop Stang High School in North Dartmouth and in Acushnet, New Haven, Connecticut, Plattsburgh, New York and elsewhere.

=== Dominican Sisters of the Sick Poor ===
Mary Walsh was an immigrant from Limerick, Ireland who worked as a laundress in wealthy homes in Manhattan. Moved by the condition of poor families in her neighborhood, she founded what would become the Dominican Sisters of the Sick Poor. In 1879 she and another young woman began their work from two rooms on West 57th Street. They eventually moved to a house owned by the Paulist Fathers on West 59th Street in Manhattan. They took in laundry to finance their work with the poor, and later established a laundry on 71st Street that provided employment for ten or twelve poor women. Due to the support of an auxiliary, the Friends of the Sick Poor, they were able to close the laundry and focus on nursing. In 1910, the Dominican Sisters of the Sick Poor were officially affiliated as a community of Dominican Tertiaries. Mother Mary Walsh, OP died on November 6, 1922. In 1949, the congregation acquired the Joseph Medill Patterson in Ossining, New York. The sisters began a home health agency to continue their work of providing home care to the poor.

== Present day ==
In 1995, the three congregations merged to form the Dominican Sisters of Hope.

The congregation is based out of The Center at Mariandale in Ossining. In 2018 the sisters granted a conservation easement for thirty-four of the sixty-one acres of Mariandale to the Westchester Land Trust.
