= Orchard Place, Des Moines, Iowa =

Mental health agency

- Predecessor: Iowa Home for Friendless Children
- Merged into: Iowa Children's Home
- Founder: Mrs. A. Y. Rawlins
- Type: Nonprofit Mental Health Services
- Staff: 346 (2021)
- Volunteers: 137 (2021)
- Students: 7029 (2021)
- Website: https://www.orchardplace.org

Orchard Place is an agency based in Des Moines, Iowa, United States, which provides inpatient and outpatient mental and behavioral health services for youth. It is one of the oldest social service agencies in Des Moines which began as the Home for Friendless Children, an agency dedicated to finding foster or adopted homes for destitute or abandoned children. Today, Orchard Place is headquartered in the South Side of Des Moines and provides services at the Orchard Place Campus, the Child Guidance Center and the PACE center.

== History ==
Children's and orphan services began in Des Moines with the formation of the Home for Friendless Children. This organization began in Illinois in 1883 not as an orphanage, but as a society dedicated to finding new homes for destitute or abandoned children. The society established a branch in Davenport, Iowa and then moved its headquarters to Des Moines in 1897. The Home for Friendless Children spread to as many as 30 states.

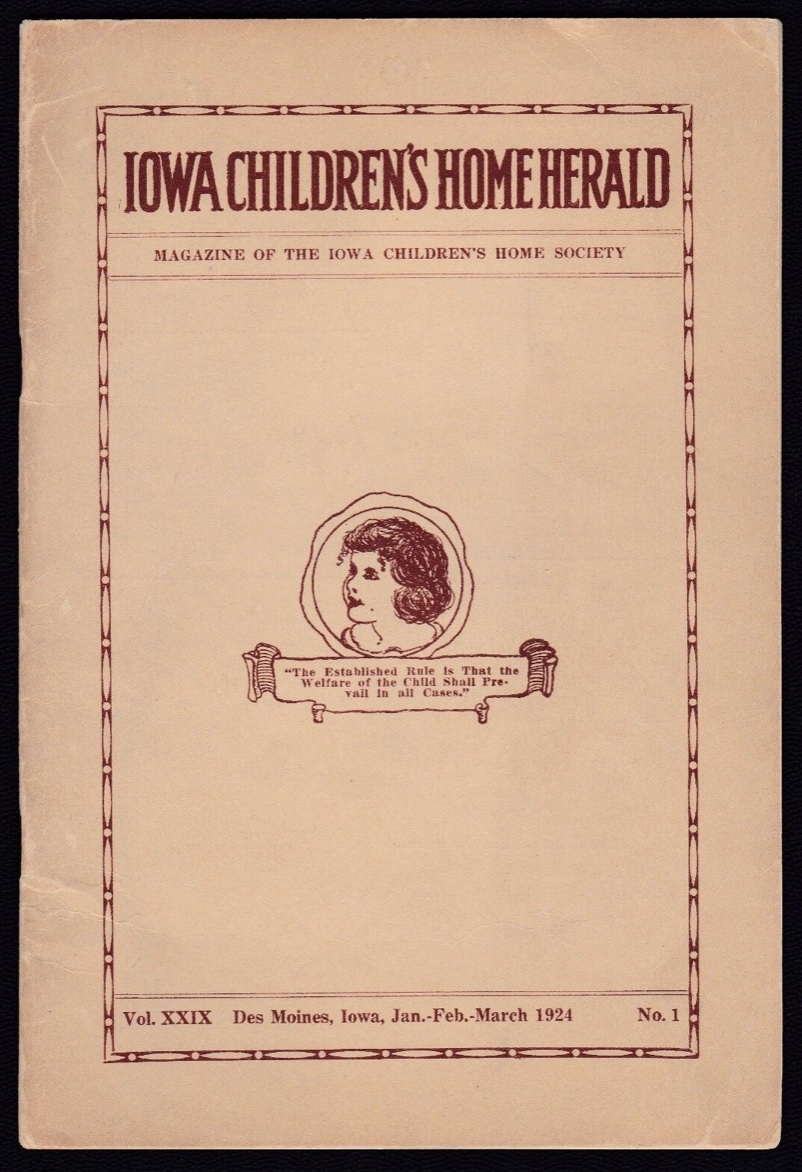
Iowa Children's Home Herald

=== Benedict Home ===
The Benedict Home was established by the WCTU in Des Moines in 1882 as a home for unwed mothers. The women and girls living in the home signed a contract to stay in the home for one year. They were provided with a room, food and Christian Spiritual guidance emphasizing temperance. The home was named for Mrs. Lovina B Blackmarr Benedict, known as "Mother Benedict." In 1885 a short history of the home was reported in The Des Moines Register. The home was "situated in North Des Moines," and was "a refuge for erring women who desire a return to the path of virtue." In 1885 the home housed 30 women who were required to sign a contract to remain in the home for six months. Apparently the home was not open to women of color. "A certain class of applicants, we are sorry to say, have to be refused admission on account of lack of suitable buildings and accommodations."

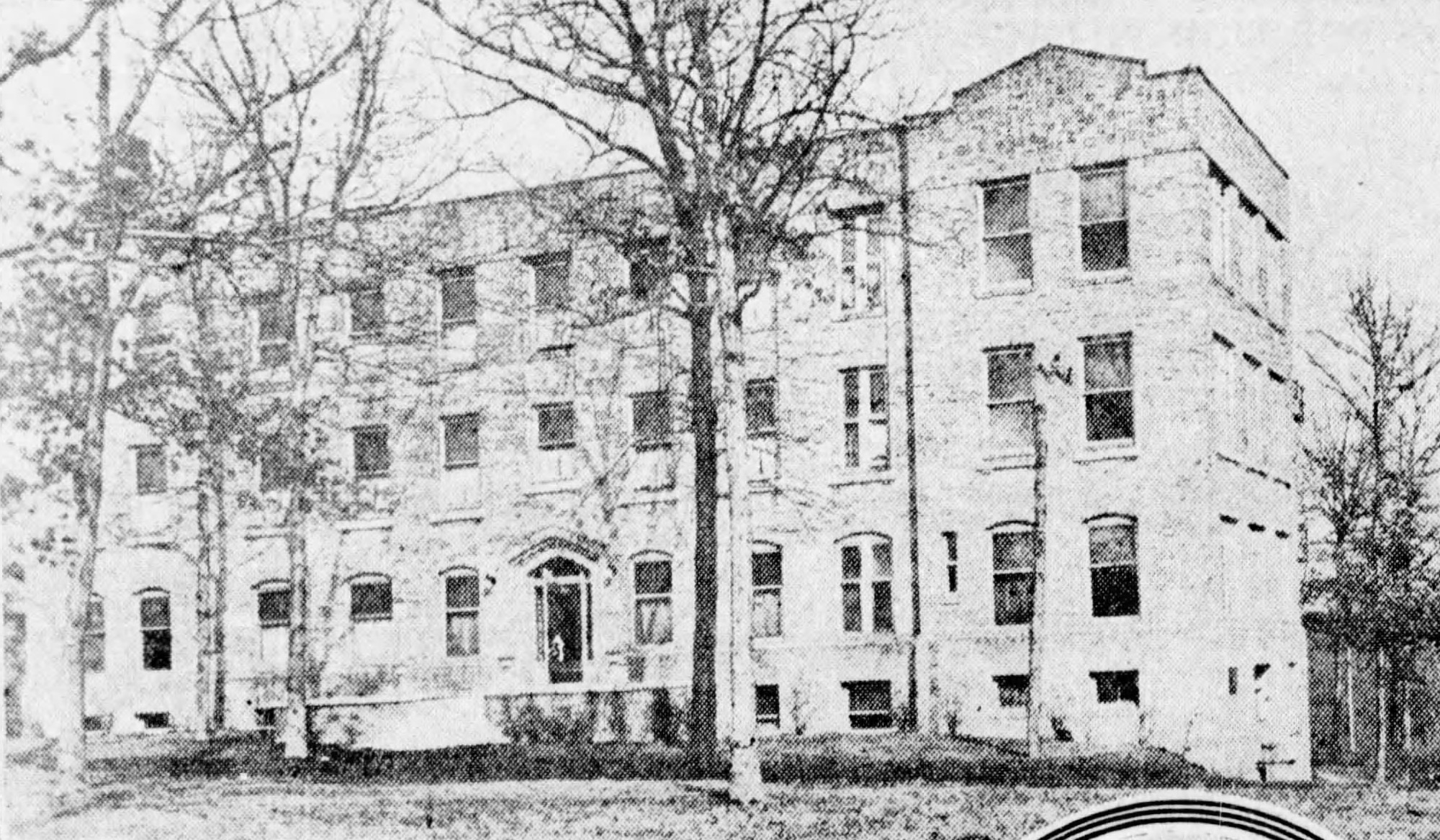
Benedict Home Des Moines, Iowa

At her death, Mother Benedict was remembered as an important social reformer in Iowa: "The death of Mrs. Benedict will cause sorrow in many Iowa homes. She was the founder of the Benedict Home, a home for fallen women in Des Moines...She was largely instrumental in securing the passage of the law raising the age of consent in Iowa from 12 to 15 and also of the law increasing the penalty for seduction." In 1910 the WCTU along with various women's club, the police and the judicial system planned to open a probation home for girls at Forest Avenue and Third street. This home would help train "wayward girls" and teach them useful domestic skills.

The home still exists in Des Moines today as The Benedict Home Transitional Housing. It is commonly wrongly thought that this home was named for St. Benedict rather than Mother Benedict, and it can be found on the Internet referred to as St. Benedict's home.

The president of the board of Benedict Home was Mrs. A. Y. Rawson. She was an influential Sunday School teacher at Plymouth Church, Des Moines, Iowa whose class members established the Sunbeam Rescue Mission in 1893. The mission provided services to homeless men, unwed mothers and prostitutes.

=== Origin Story ===
An abandoned three month old baby boy was left on the doorstep of the Benedict Home in April 1886. He was known in the home as "Charlie Basket." The home could not accommodate the foundling baby and he was taken home by a staff member. Later he was fostered by Mother Benedict. This incident was the spark that began the Home for Friendless Children in Des Moines.

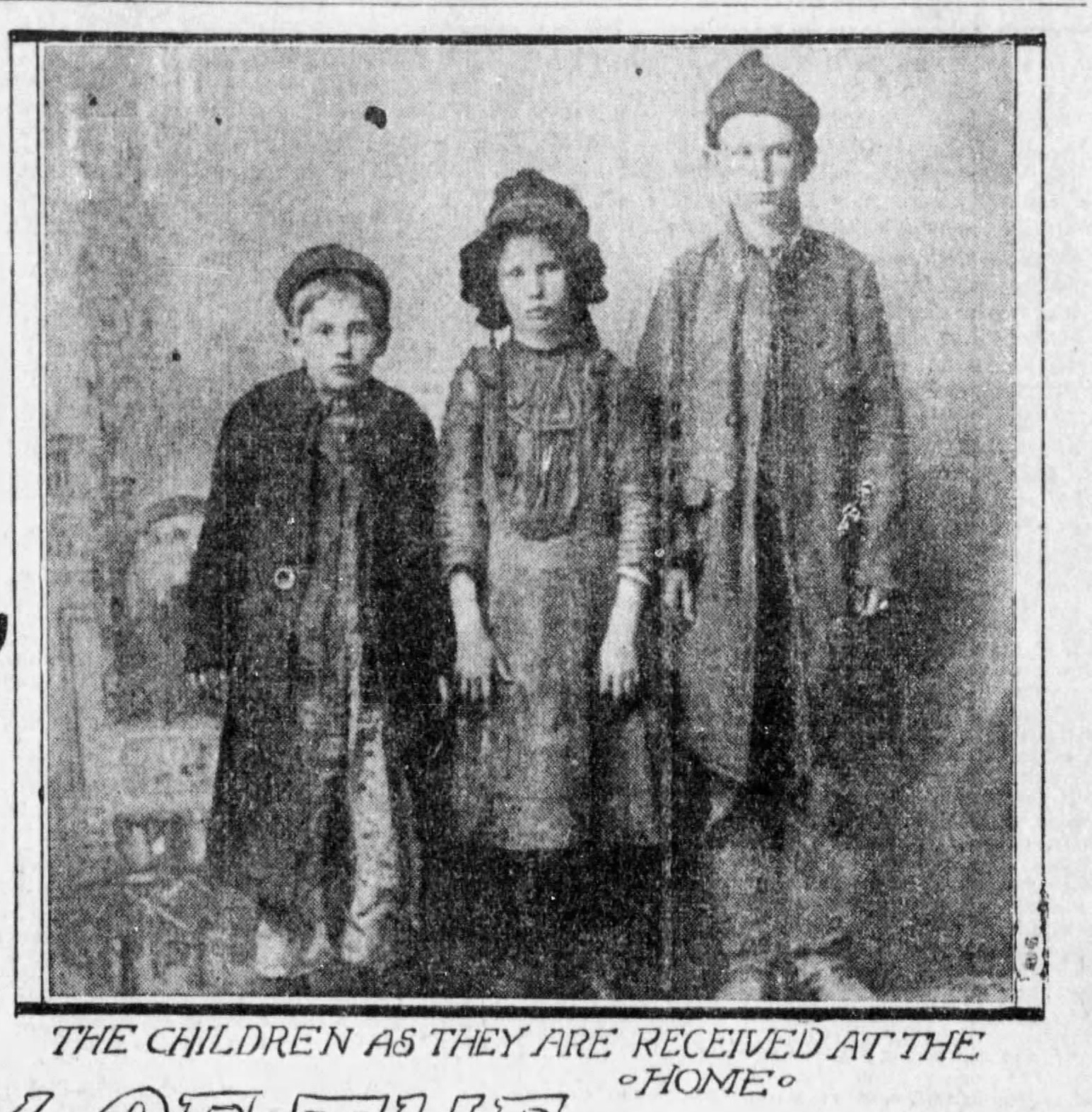
Friendless Children as they are received

=== Home for Friendless Children, Des Moines ===
Mrs. Elizabeth Mann, a member of the Des Moines Women's Club is credited with starting the Home for Friendless Children in Des Moines. It was initially connected to the Davenport organization of the same name. The Davenport organization moved its headquarters to Des Moines in 1886. The Home for Friendless Children in Davenport is not to be confused with the Iowa Soldiers' Orphans' Home in Davenport. The Benedict home story suggests that "Mrs. Dr. Cox," president of the WCTU at the time suggested the formation of the home in Des Moines.

In 1896 the home was listed as a leading charitable institution of the city. It was located at 2018 High Street.

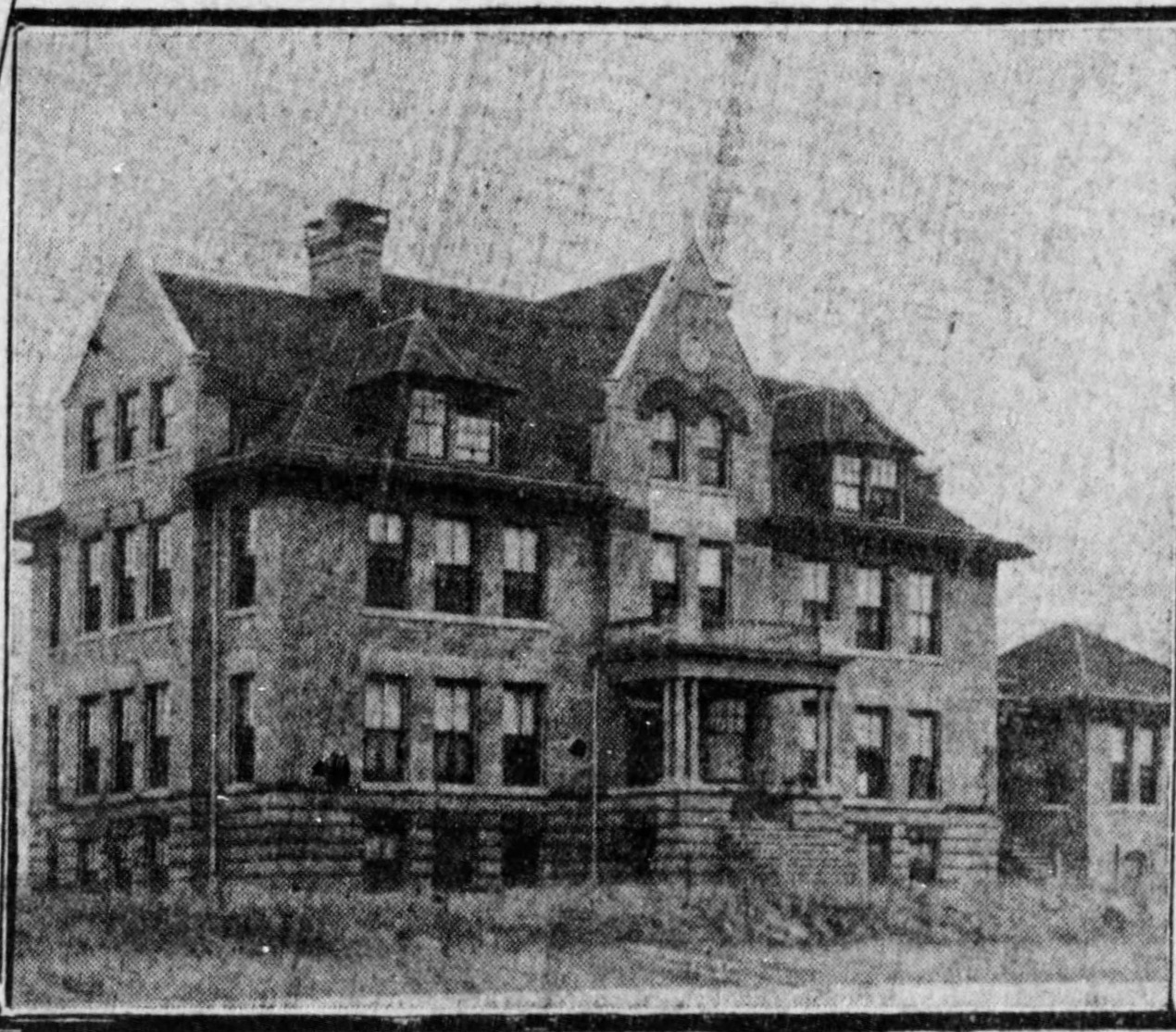
First Receiving Home for Friendless Children, Des Moines, Iowa

Prominent members of the board for the home were Mrs. Elizabeth Mann, Mrs. DL Jewett, Mrs. S.P. Rollins and Mrs. W.R. Warfield and Mrs. A.O.Reynolds. The name was soon changed to the Iowa Children's Home. The home was funded by prominent club women with various types of fundraisers. Financial reports were published annually. Fundraising for the home was not without controversy. Local clergy complained that you women were raising funds on the streets unchaperoned. An Mrs. M. McClelland was arrested and charged with unauthorized solicitation of funds.

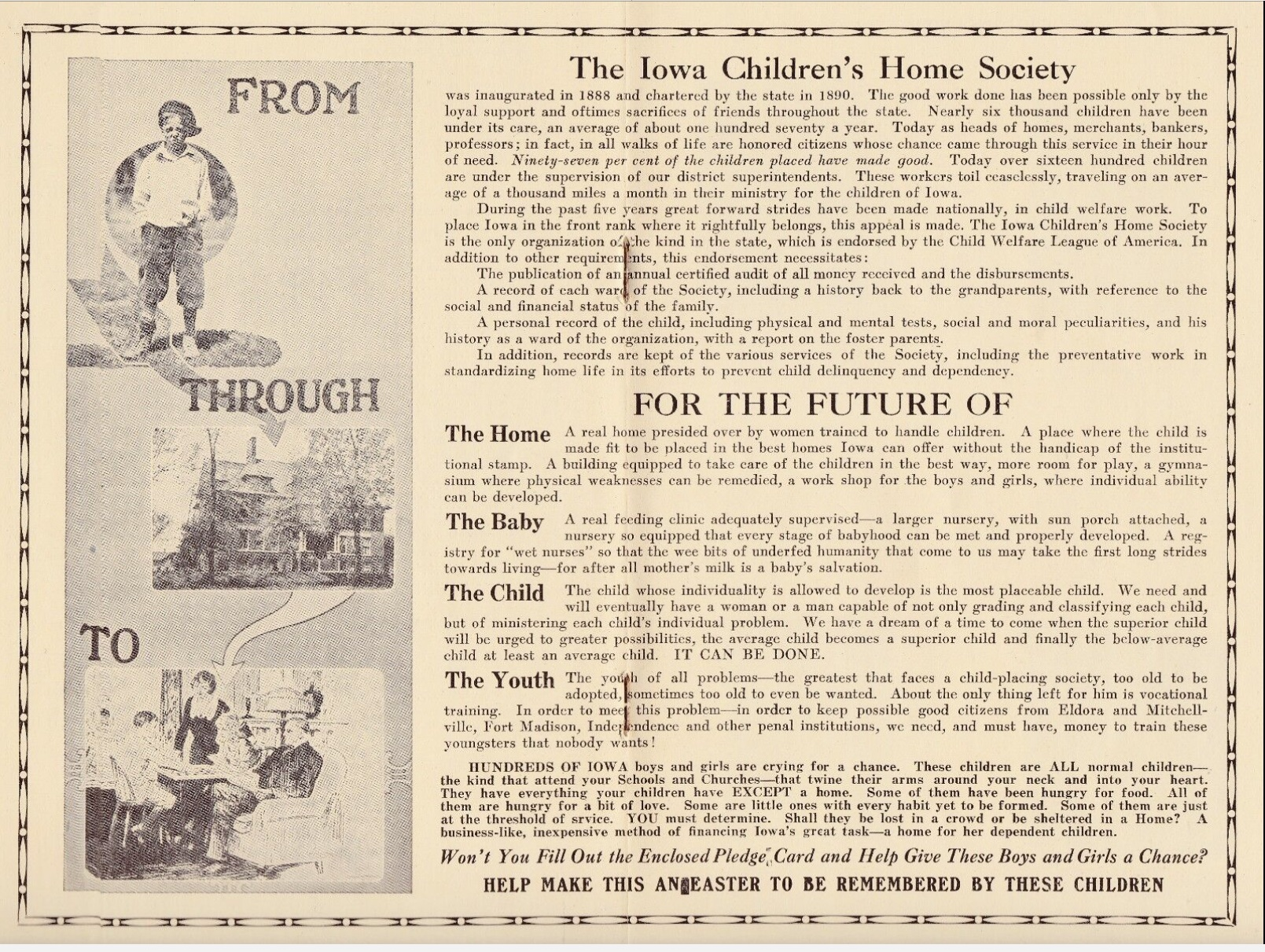
Iowa Children's Home Pamphlet

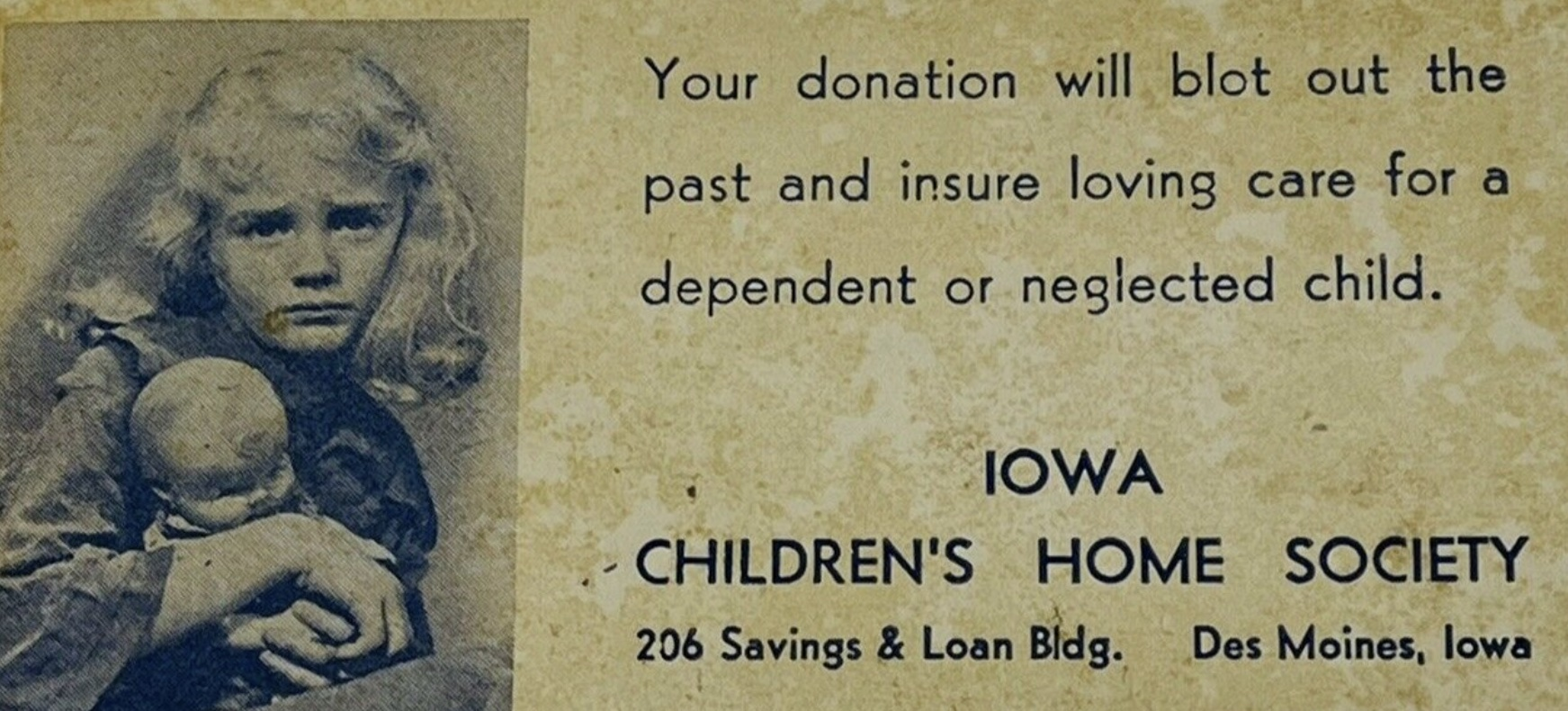
Children's Home Tag Sale Tag

=== Children and Families of Iowa ===
The fostering and adoption functions of the Iowa Children's Home were taken over by Children and Families of Iowa, an institution which provides a broad range of family services and which also claims the long history and origin story of the Home for Friendless Children and the Iowa Children's Home. "This special organization has been there for children and families for more than 132 years. It was there when children orphaned by poverty needed someone to help find them loving, permanent homes. Through the years, it has been there for “unwed” mothers, for abused women and children, for abandoned teenagers and for families on the brink of disaster." In 1968 Iowa Children and Family Services opened a new home for temporary care of children to be placed in permanent care. Later the organization was renamed Children and Families of Iowa.

=== Orchard Place ===
While Children and Families of Iowa maintained the historic foster and adoption functions of the Iowa Children's Home, Orchard Place targeted services to children's mental and behavioral treatment. In the 1975 Orchard Place campus was opened as a "dream home" for "troubled youngsters."
