= Ellen O'Keefe =

Irish-American nurse and women's shelter operator

Ellen O'Keefe was an Irish immigrant to New York City, who took up nursing. Her experience led her to open a women's shelter, and later to found a religious congregation to continue her work. St. Zita's Home for Friendless Women was established at 158 East 24th Street, New York City, in 1890. It soon moved to West 14th Street, where it remained until it ceased operations around 2002.

== Life ==
Born in County Limerick, Ireland, O'Keefe emigrated to New York in 1864. She selected nursing as a career, and during her two years' training at Charity Hospital, Blackwell's Island, first conceived the idea which was to give a direction to her life. Moved with pity for the unfortunate women with whom she there came in contact and whose previous records were so fatal an obstacle to their securing employment, she determined to found a home where they could find shelter and an opportunity for work.

=== St. Zita's Home for Friendless Women ===
Guilds had been established in Europe in honor of Saint Zita to provide homes for servants temporarily out of work, and to care those aged or incurably ill. In 1890, with her personal savings she started single-handed a home in 24th Street near the East River pier where the city's steamboats landed discharged prisoners. She was later joined by two friends (Mary Finnegan and Katherine Dunne). The house was incorporated as St. Zita's Home in 1893.

Every woman who sought admission was received without formal application and regardless of her religious views or previous character. Archbishop Michael Corrigan approved their efforts. As St. Zita's became more widely known the greatly increased number of applicants necessitated its transference to larger quarters. St. Zita's Home relocated to East 52nd Street.

=== Sisters of St. Zita ===
O'Keefe, although reluctant to form a religious community St. Zita's was dependent on O'Keefe and her friends. Archbishop Farley encouraged her to consider establishing a religious congregation to carry on her work. To prepare, O'Keefe and three others entered the novitiate of the Franciscan Sisters in Albany. Archbishop Farley approved the new congregation in September, 1903, under the title of the Sisters of Reparation of the Congregation of Mary (S.R.C.M.) (Sisters of St. Zita). O'Keefe was named Superioress of the congregation under her religious name of Mother Zita. Her companion, Katherine Dunne (Sister Mary Magdalen) took the religious habit on her death-bed. A postulancy of one year and a novitiate of two years had to be served; perpetual vows were made after five years. In 1906 Mother Zita visited her native land and returned with six novices, bringing the number of members to fifteen by 1912.

In 1907 a branch house was opened at East 79th Street. A Sister always slept near the door, since it was a rule of the community that no one was to be refused admission at any hour, day or night; the observance of this rule frequently rendered it necessary to the Sisters to give up their own beds to their humble guests.

The women were kept as long as they desired to stay; if able-bodied they had to help in the laundry or at sewing, the sole support of the home. They also replenished church supplies on ocean liners. If ill, they were cared for or sent to the hospital. Catholic residents were required to attend Mass on Sundays and any Holy Day of Obligation, but this was the sole distinction between the residents of the different religions. The Sisters also visited the poor in the hospitals, and supplied free meals to men out of employment. The number of women accommodated each night was from one hundred to 125; the meals supplied to men out of work averaged daily 65.

Mother Mary Zita died in New York City January 22, 1917.

St. Zita's home had moved to West 14th St. During the 50s, Sister Mary John Burke attended beauty school to learn how to style and cut hair to help the women look their best when applying for jobs.

The sisters made home visitations, taught religious education classes, prepared children to receive the sacraments, and trained altar boys. By 2000, the members of the congregation were both too few in number, and too advanced in years to continue to manage the shelter. The sisters relocated to their property in Monsey, New York, and the building on 14th Street was sold in the spring of 2001.

=== St. Zita's Villa ===
St. Zita's Villa, in Monsey, New York, began in 1938 as a residence for the sisters, and later became an adult home for women, where the remaining members of the congregation retired along with a number of their residents.

In April 2020, Sacred Heart Parish in Suffern, New York expressed concern over the effect of the COVID-19 virus on the community at St. Zita's Villa. Sister Maureen Francis O'Shea, S.R.C.M., the superior general of the congregation died at the age of eighty-five on March 18, 2020. The last member of the community, Sister Mary John Burke SRCM (born Ruth Burke) died at the age of 90 on September 14, 2020.

Upon executing the final wills and testaments of the last two surviving Sisters of Saint Zita's Villa of the Sisters of Reparation of the Congregation of Mary, Prena Grishaj, along with Rosa Gorman and Donna Pepino, took over the operations of Saint Zita's Villa. According to the final wishes of both Sister Maureen Frances, S.R.C.M., and Sister Mary John Burke, S.R.C.M. the operations as an adult home for women would cease without Sisters of the order to tend to its residents as they would have, having taken vows of consecrated life. They left their intentions of continuing the charity left behind by all of the nuns of this order known in their wills and trust. Where Ellen O'Keefe became the first nun of this order as Mother Zita, Ruth Burke known in religion as Sister Mary John Burke followed in succession to Sister Maureen Frances as Mother Superior of the Order as the final Mother Zita, while in hospice care. The charity now exists as a layperson-run charity for the first time since its inception in 1890 as a Charitable Trust administrated by Prena Grishaj, Donna Pepino, and Rosa Gorman.
