= Haudriettes =

Religious Congregation

The Haudriettes were a religious congregation founded in Paris early in the fourteenth century by Jeanne, wife of Étienne Haudry, a private secretary of Louis IX, king of France.

During a prolonged absence of her husband on a pilgrimage to the tomb of Santiago de Compostela (see Way of St. James), Jeanne, believing him dead, gathered under her roof a number of pious women, with whom she made a vow of perpetual chastity, and consecrated herself to a religious life devoted to the service of the poor. On his return in 1329, Étienne obtained for his wife a dispensation from her vow on condition that the pious association be permitted to retain his house and be endowed with a capital sufficient for the maintenance of twelve poor women. He also erected a chapel for the community, which was soon in possession of its own hospital, and rapidly increased in numbers. The statutes of the Haudriettes, as prescribed for them by Cardinal d'Ailly, were approved in 1414 by Cardinal Nicolò da Pisa, legate of Pope John XXII, and later confirmed by several pontiffs. A gradual relaxation in the original fervour of the congregation caused a thorough reform to be instituted under Cardinal de La Rochefoucauld, Grand Almoner of France. Pope Gregory XV placed the religious under the Rule of St. Augustine, the vow of poverty being added to those of chastity and obedience and monastic observance and the recitation of the Office of the Blessed Virgin imposed. In 1622 the motherhouse was transferred to Rue Saint-Honoré, where a new monastery and church were built, the latter being dedicated to the Assumption of Mary, from which the religious were thenceforth called Daughters of the Assumption. The congregation was not restored after the French Revolution.
