= Electoral history of John Garamendi =

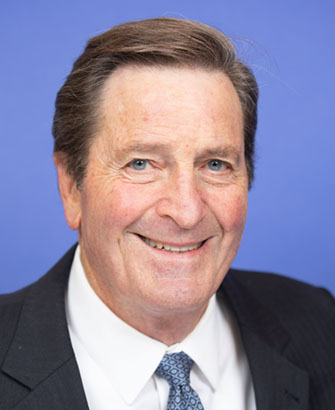
Official portrait, 118th Congress

John Garamendi is an American politician serving in the United States House of Representatives since 2009. He is currently representing California's 8th congressional district. Garamendi previously served in the California State Legislature in the 1970's and 80's, as well as two non-consecutive terms as the California Insurance Commissioner and a partial term as Lieutenant Governor of California. Garamendi twice ran unsuccessfully in the Democratic primary for the Governor of California, and unsuccessfully ran for California State Controller.

== California State Assembly ==
1974 California State Assembly 7th district election
Party	Candidate	Votes	%
Democratic	John Garamendi	60,380	64.08
Republican	Douglas F. Carter	33,842	35.92
Total votes		94,222	100.00
Democratic gain from Republican			

== California State Senate ==
1976 California State Senate 13th district election
Party	Candidate	Votes	%
Democratic	John Garamendi	103,953	52.81
Republican	Bob Whitten	92,872	47.19
Total votes		196,825	100.00
Democratic hold			

1980 California State Senate 13th district election
Party	Candidate	Votes	%
Democratic	John Garamendi (incumbent)	160,490	65.77
Republican	William V.D. "Bill" Johnson	83,520	34.23
Total votes		244,010	100.00
Democratic hold			

1984 California State Senate 5th district election
Party	Candidate	Votes	%
Democratic	John Garamendi (incumbent)	176,910	69.11
Republican	John W. Saunders, III	70,919	27.70
Peace and Freedom	Nancy Warner	8,174	3.19
Total votes		256,003	100.00
Democratic gain from Republican			

1988 California State Senate 5th district election
Party	Candidate	Votes	%
Democratic	John Garamendi (incumbent)	184,171	69.11
Republican	Sam L. Lawrence	82,310	30.89
Total votes		266,481	100.00
Democratic hold			

== California State Controller ==
1986 California State Controller Democratic primary
Party	Candidate	Votes	%
Democratic	Gray Davis	1,087,895	50.04
Democratic	John Garamendi	821,415	37.79
Democratic	Alister McAlister	264,599	12.17
Total votes		2,173,909	100.00

== California Insurance Commissioner ==
1990 California Insurance Commissioner election
Primary election
Party	Candidate	Votes	%
Democratic	John Garamendi	849,678	35.52
Democratic	Bill Press	675,273	28.22
Democratic	Conway Collis	398,503	16.66
Democratic	Walter A. Zelman	199,565	8.34
Democratic	Ray Bourhis	118,490	4.95
Democratic	Larry Murphy	79,763	3.33
Democratic	Michael Blanco	71,291	2.98
Total votes		2,392,563	100.00
General election
Democratic	John Garamendi	3,770,717	52.22
Republican	Wes Bannister	2,736,577	37.90
Libertarian	Ted Brown	431,317	5.97
Peace and Freedom	Tom Condit	281,276	3.90
No party	John J. "Jack" Harden (write-in)	553	0.01
No party	Eli Green (write-in)	68	0.00
Total votes		7,220,508	100.00
Democratic win (new seat)			

2002 California Insurance Commissioner election
Primary election
Party	Candidate	Votes	%
Democratic	John Garamendi	800,146	38.55
Democratic	Tom Umberg	586,112	28.24
Democratic	Tom Calderon	476,234	22.94
Democratic	Bill Winslow	213,239	10.27
Total votes		2,075,731	100.00
General election
Democratic	John Garamendi	3,346,937	46.48
Republican	Gary Mendoza	2,998,243	41.64
Green	David I. Sheidlower	277,667	3.86
Libertarian	Dale F. Ogden	236,688	3.29
Natural Law	Raul Calderon Jr.	192,001	2.67
American Independent	Steve Klein	148,893	2.07
Total votes		7,200,429	100.00
Democratic hold			

== Governor of California ==
1982 California gubernatorial Democratic primary
Party	Candidate	Votes	%
Democratic	Tom Bradley	1,726,985	61.08
Democratic	John Garamendi	712,161	25.19
Democratic	Mario G. Obledo	132,402	4.68
Democratic	Frank L. Thomas	51,158	1.81
Democratic	Linda Irene Parnell	45,607	1.61
Democratic	Hugh G. Bagley	40,335	1.43
Democratic	John Hancock Abbott	26,989	0.95
Democratic	Ben Trevino	19,220	0.68
Democratic	Genevieve Grafe Marcus	16,124	0.57
Democratic	Raymond V. Liebenberg	15,267	0.54
Democratic	Jules Kimmett	15,182	0.54
Democratic	Josephum S. Ramos	12,948	0.46
Democratic	Allen Lee Seaman	12,942	0.46
Write-in		28	0.00
Total votes		2,827,348	100.00

1994 California gubernatorial Democratic primary
Party	Candidate	Votes	%
Democratic	Kathleen Brown	1,110,372	48.38
Democratic	John Garamendi	755,876	32.93
Democratic	Tom Hayden	318,777	13.89
Democratic	Charles Pineda Jr.	57,314	2.50
Democratic	Jonathan Trip	31,716	1.38
Democratic	Mark Calney	21,121	0.92
Total votes		2,295,176	100.00

== Lieutenant Governor of California ==
2006 California Lieutenant Governor election
Primary election
Party	Candidate	Votes	%
Democratic	John Garamendi	1,045,130	42.53
Democratic	Jackie Speier	975,547	39.70
Democratic	Liz Figueroa	436,868	17.78
Total votes		2,457,545	100.00
General election
Democratic	John Garamendi	4,189,584	49.12
Republican	Tom McClintock	3,845,858	45.09
Green	Donna Warren	239,107	2.80
Libertarian	Lynnette Shaw	142,851	1.67
American Independent	Jim King	68,446	0.80
Peace and Freedom	Stewart Alexander	43,319	0.51
Total votes		8,529,165	100.00
Democratic hold			

== U.S. House of Representatives ==
=== California's 10th congressional district ===
2009 California's 10th congressional district special election
Primary election
Party	Candidate	Votes	%
Democratic	John Garamendi	27,580	25.70
Republican	David Harmer	22,582	21.05
Democratic	Mark DeSaulnier	18,888	17.60
Democratic	Joan Buchanan	12,896	12.02
Democratic	Anthony Woods	9,388	8.75
Republican	Chris Bunch	4,871	4.54
Republican	Gary Clift	4,158	3.88
Republican	John Toth	3,340	3.11
Republican	David Peterson	1,671	1.56
Green	Jeremy Cloward	552	0.51
Republican	Mark Loos	418	0.39
Democratic	Adriel Hampton	376	0.35
American Independent	Jerome Denham	309	0.29
Peace and Freedom	Mary McIlroy	272	0.25
Democratic	Tiffany Attwood (write-in)	2	0.00
Total votes		107,303	100.00
General election
Democratic	John Garamendi	72,817	52.85
Republican	David Harmer	59,017	42.83
Green	Jeremy Cloward	2,515	1.83
Peace and Freedom	Mary McIlroy	1,846	1.34
American Independent	Jerome Denham	1,591	1.15
Total votes		137,786	100.00
Democratic hold			

2010 California's 10th congressional district election
Primary election
Party	Candidate	Votes	%
Democratic	John Garamendi (incumbent)	62,138	100.00
Total votes		62,138	100.00
General election
Democratic	John Garamendi (incumbent)	137,578	58.84
Republican	Gary Clift	88,512	37.86
Green	Jeremy Cloward	7,716	3.30
Total votes		233,806	100.00
Democratic hold			

=== California's 3rd congressional district ===
2012 California's 3rd congressional district election
Primary election
Party	Candidate	Votes	%
Democratic	John Garamendi (incumbent)	59,546	51.30
Republican	Kim Vann	30,254	20.71
Republican	Rick Tubbs	17,902	15.42
Republican	Tony Carlos	5,541	4.77
Republican	Eugene Ray	2,438	2.10
Total votes		116,081	100.00
General election
Democratic	John Garamendi (incumbent)	126,882	54.23
Republican	Kim Vann	107,086	45.77
Total votes		233,968	100.00
Democratic gain from Republican			

2014 California's 3rd congressional district election
Primary election
Party	Candidate	Votes	%
Democratic	John Garamendi (incumbent)	54,672	53.48
Republican	Dan Logue	47,560	46.52
Total votes		102,232	100.00
General election
Democratic	John Garamendi (incumbent)	79,224	52.72
Republican	Dan Logue	71,036	47.28
Total votes		150,260	100.00
Democratic hold			

2016 California's 3rd congressional district election
Primary election
Party	Candidate	Votes	%
Democratic	John Garamendi (incumbent)	98,430	63.11
Republican	N. Eugene Cleek	37,843	24.26
Republican	Ryan Detert	19,699	12.63
Total votes		155,972	100.00
General election
Democratic	John Garamendi (incumbent)	152,513	59.35
Republican	N. Eugene Cleek	104,453	40.65
Total votes		256,966	100.00
Democratic hold			

2018 California's 3rd congressional district election
Primary election
Party	Candidate	Votes	%
Democratic	John Garamendi (incumbent)	74,552	53.59
Republican	Charlie Schaupp	58,598	42.12
Democratic	Kevin Puett	5,971	4.29
Total votes		139,121	100.00
General election
Democratic	John Garamendi (incumbent)	134,875	58.07
Republican	Charlie Schaupp	97,376	41.93
Total votes		232,251	100.00
Democratic hold			

2020 California's 3rd congressional district election
Primary election
Party	Candidate	Votes	%
Democratic	John Garamendi (incumbent)	110,504	59.20
Republican	Tamika Hamilton	50,925	27.28
Republican	Sean Feucht	25,243	13.52
Total votes		186,672	100.00
General election
Democratic	John Garamendi (incumbent)	176,043	54.67
Republican	Tamika Hamilton	145,945	45.33
Total votes		321,988	100.00
Democratic hold			

=== California's 8th congressional district ===
2022 California's 8th congressional district election
Primary election
Party	Candidate	Votes	%
Democratic	John Garamendi (incumbent)	72,333	63.09
Republican	Rudy Recile	23,518	20.51
Democratic	Cheryl Sudduth	11,378	9.92
Democratic	Christopher Riley	3,926	3.42
Democratic	Edwin Rutsch	3,268	2.85
Democratic	Demnlus Johnson (write-in)	234	0.20
Total votes		114,657	100.00
General election
Democratic	John Garamendi (incumbent)	145,501	75.73
Republican	Rudy Recile	46,634	24.27
Total votes		192,135	100.00
Democratic gain from Republican			

2024 California's 8th congressional district election
Primary election
Party	Candidate	Votes	%
Democratic	John Garamendi (incumbent)	100,193	76.99
Republican	Rudy Recile	29,944	23.01
Total votes		130,137	100.00
General election
Democratic	John Garamendi (incumbent)	201,962	73.97
Republican	Rudy Recile	71,068	26.03
Total votes		273,030	100.00
Democratic hold			
