= Bill Quirk =

American politician

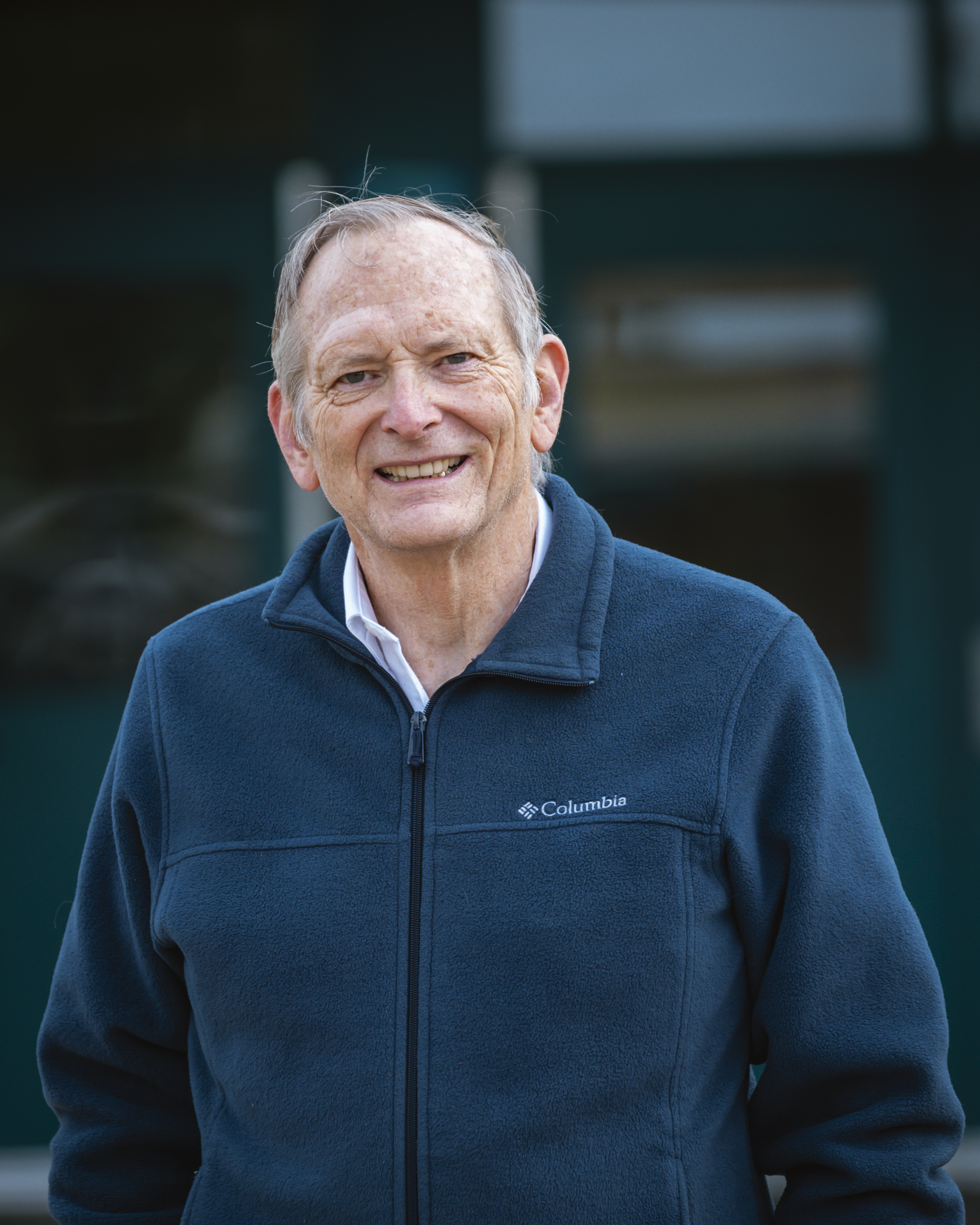
- Quirk in 2020

Member of the California State Assembly from the 20th district
- In office December 3, 2012 – November 30, 2022
- Preceded by: Bob Wieckowski (redistricted)
- Succeeded by: Liz Ortega

Member of the Hayward City Council
- In office 2004–2012

Personal details
- Born: September 1, 1946 (age 80) Summit, New Jersey, U.S.
- Party: Democratic
- Education: Columbia University (BS, PhD)
- Profession: Nuclear physicist

William J. Quirk (born September 1, 1946) is an American politician who served in the California State Assembly from 2012 to 2022. A member of the Democratic Party, Quirk represented the 20th Assembly district, which encompasses the southern East Bay of the San Francisco Bay Area.

Prior to being elected to the Assembly in 2012, he was a nuclear physicist and served on the Hayward City Council.

== Education ==
After earning his Ph.D. in astrophysics from Columbia University at the age of 24, Quirk became a postdoctoral fellow at the California Institute of Technology in Pasadena, where he published papers on galactic structure.

== Career ==
=== Physicist ===
Upon returning to New York City, Quirk joined NASA as a research scientist and developed the Goddard Institute for Space Studies climate model, which he used for some of the first studies of climate change. Quirk left NASA to work at the management consulting firm McKinsey and Company in New York City in their computer system practice. Quirk then worked in the computer industry in Silicon Valley before settling into a career at the Lawrence Livermore National Laboratory (LLNL), where he established himself in the fields of atmospheric science and nuclear technology design. Quirk became this country's expert in nuclear programs in numerous foreign countries. Quirk prepared reports for the Presidential Daily Brief and played a key role in the negotiations for the Nuclear Test Ban Treaty. Teaching physics at Columbia University, Caltech and UC Davis helped Quirk formulate his lifelong interest in education.

Quirk was a physicist at LLNL for 26 years (1979–2005). In 1996, he helped break the deadlock in the negotiations of the Comprehensive Nuclear-Test-Ban Treaty. In the early 1990s, he also showed that the plutonium parts of nuclear weapons could be reused. This resulted in the closing of the Rocky Flats plutonium fabrication facility near Denver, Colorado. This removed the threat of a major environment disaster in the Denver metropolitan area. There had already been a major fire at the facility that had threatened to spread plutonium oxide across the metropolitan area.

=== Politics ===
==== City Council ====
Quirk served from 2004 to 2012 on the Hayward City Council. While on the council, Quirk served on the Board of Bay Area Water Supply and Conservation Agency, and the Hayward Area Shoreline Planning Agency. While on the city council, Quirk was dedicated to revitalizing Hayward through promoting jobs and safe and clean neighborhoods.

Quirk also served on the city's Hayward-Ghazni Sister City Committee, promoting relations between the city and the province of Ghazni, Afghanistan, while on the council.

=== California State Assembly ===
Quirk entered the California State Assembly in 2012 and served through 2022. Although he initially expected to concentrate on legislation aimed at reducing greenhouse gas emissions, he later described his legislative agenda as developing largely through committee work, recommendations from legislative staff, constituent concerns, and issues that arose during his time in office.

Among Quirk's early legislation was AB 535 (2013), which addressed California's Amber Alert system by clarifying that a custodial parent could be considered an abductor when a child was believed to be in imminent danger.

In 2014, he authored AB 2089, which sought to improve the process for domestic violence victims seeking restraining orders.

==== Telecommunications ====
A significant portion of Quirk's legislative work concerned telecommunications infrastructure. In 2015, he authored AB 57, legislation concerning local permitting for wireless telecommunications facilities. The measure established provisions under which certain wireless facility applications could be deemed approved when local governments did not act within applicable federal time limits.

Quirk later authored AB 2421 (2020), which addressed permitting for emergency backup generators used at cell sites. The legislation was intended to facilitate the deployment of backup power infrastructure for telecommunications facilities, including during emergencies.

In 2017, Quirk also co-authored SB 649, a proposal intended to streamline the deployment of small-cell wireless infrastructure. The legislation faced opposition from cities and counties and was vetoed by Governor Jerry Brown.

==== Distracted driving ====
In 2016, Quirk authored AB 1785, which prohibited drivers from holding and operating a cellular telephone while driving. The legislation formed part of California's efforts to strengthen restrictions on handheld cellphone use behind the wheel.

==== Environmental and climate legislation ====
Environmental policy was another major area of Quirk's legislative work. He authored AB 2800 (2016), which established the Climate-Safe Infrastructure Working Group to examine how climate projections could be incorporated into the planning and engineering of state infrastructure.

Quirk also worked on legislation concerning environmental contaminants and public health. As chair of the Assembly's Environmental Safety and Toxic Materials Committee, he advocated for tighter limits on substances including lead and PFAS and supported legislation addressing plastic pollution in waterways and the Pacific Ocean.

In 2020, he co-authored AB 2762, known as the Toxic-Free Cosmetics Act, which restricted the use of 24 chemicals in cosmetic products sold in California. The legislation was based in part on California's efforts to regulate substances already subject to restrictions in the European Union.

Quirk was also involved in legislation concerning California's greenhouse-gas reduction policies. He supported legislation implementing the state's cap-and-trade system while emphasizing the need to meet the greenhouse-gas reduction goals established under California's climate legislation while maintaining energy affordability and reliability. His final bill, AB 2133 (2022), concerned advancing the state's 2030 climate goals.

==== Public safety and health ====
Quirk sponsored legislation addressing a range of public safety issues. AB 1316 (2017) concerned childhood lead-poisoning screening, while AB 2222 (2018) expanded firearms reporting requirements to law-enforcement agencies throughout California. He also worked on legislation concerning rape-kit testing and tracking and police body cameras.

He also supported legislation AB51 (2015-16) establishing guidelines for motorcycle lane splitting by the California Highway Patrol.

==== Muslim American community ====
In 2016, Quirk introduced a California Assembly resolution designating August as Muslim Appreciation and Awareness Month. He subsequently introduced the resolution annually during his remaining time in the Assembly. In 2017, he invited Judge Halim Dhanidina, described in the questionnaire as California's first Muslim American judge, to the Assembly floor for a special recognition.

Quirk's work in this area was recognized by the Bay Area chapter of the Council on American-Islamic Relations, which presented him with its Promoting Justice Award.

==== California Advanced Services Fund ====
Quirk also introduced AB 2130 during the 2015–16 legislative session. The legislation concerned the California Advanced Services Fund, a state program administered through the California Public Utilities Commission to support the deployment of advanced communications services to underserved areas. The questionnaire specifically identifies previous descriptions of this legislation as inaccurate and requests that incorrect information about the bill be removed from Quirk's Wikipedia article.

==== PG&E and wildfire legislation ====
Quirk's questionnaire also identifies inaccurate descriptions concerning legislation relating to Pacific Gas and Electric Company and the 2017 Northern California wildfires. It specifically points to AB 33 and its provision calling for a Public Utilities Commission prudency review of PG&E's actions related to the wildfires. Under the provision quoted in the questionnaire, costs or expenses determined by the commission to be disallowed would be addressed through customer credits, while previously authorized securitization financing orders would not be amended

===== 2012 California State Assembly =====
California State Assembly election, 2012
Primary election
Party	Candidate	Votes	%
Democratic	Bill Quirk	17,177	30.3
Democratic	Jennifer Ong	14,560	25.7
No party preference	Mark Green	11,490	20.3
Republican	Luis Reynoso	10,041	17.7
Democratic	Sarabjit Kaur Cheema	3,397	6.0
Total votes		56,665	100.0
General election
Democratic	Bill Quirk	67,028	50.3
Democratic	Jennifer Ong	66,111	49.7
Total votes		133,139	100.0
Democratic hold			

===== 2014 California State Assembly =====
California's 20th State Assembly district election, 2014
Primary election
Party	Candidate	Votes	%
Democratic	Bill Quirk (incumbent)	31,882	66.0
Republican	Jaime Patino	11,246	23.3
No party preference	Luis Reynoso	5,186	10.7
Total votes		48,314	100.0
General election
Democratic	Bill Quirk (incumbent)	56,144	71.8
Republican	Jaime Patino	22,007	28.2
Total votes		78,151	100.0
Democratic hold			

===== 2016 California State Assembly =====
California's 20th State Assembly district election, 2016
Primary election
Party	Candidate	Votes	%
Democratic	Bill Quirk (incumbent)	66,526	77.7
Republican	Luis A. Wong	19,078	22.3
Total votes		85,604	100.0
General election
Democratic	Bill Quirk (incumbent)	114,001	74.3
Republican	Luis A. Wong	39,507	25.7
Total votes		153,508	100.0
Democratic hold			

===== 2018 California State Assembly =====
California's 20th State Assembly district election, 2018
Primary election
Party	Candidate	Votes	%
Democratic	Bill Quirk (incumbent)	56,762	99.9
Republican	Joseph Grcar (write-in)	81	0.1
Total votes		56,843	100.0
General election
Democratic	Bill Quirk (incumbent)	105,848	77.4
Republican	Joseph Grcar	30,863	22.6
Total votes		136,711	100.0
Democratic hold			

===== 2020 California State Assembly =====
California's 20th State Assembly district election, 2020
Primary election
Party	Candidate	Votes	%
Democratic	Bill Quirk (incumbent)	42,606	47.1%
Democratic	Alexis Villalobos	19,900	22.0%
Republican	Son Nguyen	18,410	20.4%
Democratic	Vipan Singh Bajwa	9,463	10.5%
Total votes		90,379	100.0%
General election
Democratic	Bill Quirk (incumbent)	100,105	56.9%
Democratic	Alexis Villalobos	75,672	43.1%
Total votes		175,777	100.0%

== Personal life ==
Quirk and his wife Laurel moved to the Hayward area in 1978. They raised two children who attended Moreau Catholic High School and the University of California. Since moving to Hayward in 1978, Quirk served the community as president of Hayward Friends of the Library and chair, Hayward Library Commission. He is a member of Hayward Rotary, the Hayward Arts Council and the Hayward Area Historical Society.
