= California's 20th State Assembly district =

American legislative district

Current assemblymember
Liz Ortega; D–San Leandro
- Population (2020) • Voting age: 516,830; 408,760
- Demographics: 20.11% White; 8.65% Black; 31.35% Latino; 33.91% Asian; 0.22% Native American; 1.52% Hawaiian/Pacific Islander; 0.54% other; 4.52% remainder of multiracial

California's 20th State Assembly district is one of 80 California State Assembly districts. It is represented by Democrat Liz Ortega of San Leandro.

== District profile ==
The district is located in the southern East Bay, centered on Hayward. The district is a major gateway between the Tri–Valley to the east, Silicon Valley to the south, and the rest of the San Francisco Bay Area.

Alameda County – (30.70%)

- Dublin – (39.44%)
- Hayward
- Pleasanton – (20.03%)
- San Leandro
- Union City

== Election results from statewide races ==
Year	Office	Results
2022	Governor	Newsom 72.7 – 27.3%
2022	Senator	Padilla 73.7 – 26.3%
2021	Recall	No 75.7 – 24.3%
2020	President	Biden 74.7 – 23.2%
2018	Governor	Newsom 74.8 – 25.2%
2018	Senator	Feinstein 58.5 – 41.5%
2016	President	Clinton 75.5 – 19.1%
2016	Senator	Harris 69.1 – 30.9%
2014	Governor	Brown 76.8 – 23.2%
2012	President	Obama 75.7 – 22.2%
2012	Senator	Feinstein 78.3 – 21.7%

== List of assembly members representing the district ==
Due to redistricting, the 20th district has been moved around different parts of the state. The current iteration resulted from the 2021 redistricting by the California Citizens Redistricting Commission.

Assembly members	Party	Years served	Counties represented	Notes
Dwight Hollister	Republican	January 5, 1885 – January 3, 1887	Sacramento	
Seymour Carr	Republican	January 3, 1887 – January 5, 1889	Sacramento	
L. H. Fassett	Republican	January 5, 1889 – December 16, 1889	Sacramento	Died in office.
Vacant		December 16, 1889 – January 5, 1891	Sacramento	
Gillis Doty	Democratic	January 5, 1891 – January 2, 1893	Sacramento	
William A. Anderson	Republican	January 2, 1893 – January 7, 1895	Sacramento	
Judson C. Brusie	Republican	January 7, 1895 – January 4, 1897	Sacramento	
William M. Sims	Republican	January 4, 1897 – January 2, 1899	Sacramento	
Grove L. Johnson	Republican	January 2, 1899 – January 5, 1903	Sacramento	
W. S. Killingsworth	Democratic	January 5, 1903 – January 2, 1905	Solano	
Frank R. Devlin	Republican	January 2, 1905 – January 4, 1909	Solano	
John Roche Cronin	Republican	January 4, 1909 – January 6, 1913	Solano	
Wilber C. Wall	Democratic	January 6, 1913 – January 4, 1915	San Joaquin	
Lawrence Edwards	Democratic	January 4, 1915 – January 6, 1919	San Joaquin	
Charles Lamb	Republican	January 6, 1919 – January 6, 1920	San Joaquin	Died in office.
Vacant		January 6, 1920 – January 3, 1921	San Joaquin	
Oscar C. Parkinson	Republican	January 3, 1921 – January 8, 1923	San Joaquin	
George A. Dean	Republican	January 8, 1923 – January 5, 1925	San Joaquin	
Tom H. Louttit	Republican	January 5, 1925 – January 3, 1927	San Joaquin	
Forsythe Charles Clowdsley	Democratic	January 3, 1927 – January 5, 1931	San Joaquin	
Theodore McKay Wright	Republican	January 5, 1931 – January 2, 1933	Santa Clara	
Thomas A. Maloney	Republican	January 2, 1933 – January 7, 1957	San Francisco	
Phillip Burton	Democratic	January 7, 1957 – February 24, 1964	San Francisco	Resigned from the State Assembly after winning a special election for California's 5th congressional district.
Vacant		February 24, 1964 – January 4, 1965	San Francisco	
John Burton	Democratic	January 4, 1965 – June 25, 1974	San Francisco	Resigned from the State Assembly after winning a special election for California's 6th congressional district.
Vacant		June 25, 1974 – December 2, 1974	San Francisco	
Dixon Arnett	Republican	December 2, 1974 – November 30, 1978	San Mateo	
Robert W. Naylor	Republican	December 4, 1978 – November 30, 1986	San Mateo	
Bill Duplissea	Republican	December 1, 1986 – November 30, 1988	San Mateo	
Ted Lempert	Democratic	December 5, 1988 – November 30, 1992	San Mateo	
Delaine Eastin	Democratic	December 7, 1992 – November 30, 1994	Alameda, Santa Clara	
Liz Figueroa	Democratic	December 5, 1994 – November 30, 1998	Alameda, Santa Clara	
John A. Dutra	Democratic	December 7, 1998 – November 30, 2004	Alameda, Santa Clara	
Alberto Torrico	Democratic	December 6, 2004 – November 30, 2010	Alameda, Santa Clara	
Bob Wieckowski	Democratic	December 6, 2010 – November 30, 2012	Alameda, Santa Clara	
Bill Quirk	Democratic	December 3, 2012 – November 30, 2022	Alameda	
Liz Ortega	Democratic	December 5, 2022 – present	Alameda	

== Election results (1990–present) ==
=== 2024 ===
2024 California State Assembly 20th district election
Primary election
Party	Candidate	Votes	%
Democratic	Liz Ortega (incumbent)	57,083	99.3
Republican	Sangeetha Shanbhogue (write-in)	284	0.5
Republican	Joseph Grcar (write-in)	116	0.2
Total votes		57,483	100.0
General election
Democratic	Liz Ortega (incumbent)	126,615	72.9
Republican	Sangeetha Shanbhogue	47,060	27.1
Total votes		173,675	100.0
Democratic hold			

=== 2022 ===
2022 California State Assembly 20th district election
Primary election
Party	Candidate	Votes	%
Democratic	Liz Ortega	23,503	32.2
Democratic	Shawn Kumagai	17,481	23.9
Democratic	Jennifer Esteen	16,211	22.2
Republican	Joseph Grcar	15,869	21.7
Total votes		73,064	100.0
General election
Democratic	Liz Ortega	68,853	62.2
Democratic	Shawn Kumagai	41,917	37.8
Total votes		110,770	100.0
Democratic hold			

=== 2020 ===
2020 California State Assembly 20th district election
Primary election
Party	Candidate	Votes	%
Democratic	Bill Quirk (incumbent)	42,606	47.1
Democratic	Alexis Villalobos	19,900	22.0
Republican	Son Nguyen	18,410	20.4
Democratic	Vipan Singh Bajwa	9,463	10.5
Total votes		90,379	100.0
General election
Democratic	Bill Quirk (incumbent)	100,105	56.9
Democratic	Alexis Villalobos	75,672	43.1
Total votes		175,777	100.0
Democratic hold			

=== 2018 ===
2018 California State Assembly 20th district election
Primary election
Party	Candidate	Votes	%
Democratic	Bill Quirk (incumbent)	56,762	99.9
Republican	Joseph Grcar (write-in)	81	0.1
Total votes		56,843	100.0
General election
Democratic	Bill Quirk (incumbent)	105,848	77.4
Republican	Joseph Grcar	30,863	22.6
Total votes		136,711	100.0
Democratic hold			

=== 2016 ===
2016 California State Assembly 20th district election
Primary election
Party	Candidate	Votes	%
Democratic	Bill Quirk (incumbent)	66,526	77.7
Republican	Luis A. Wong	19,078	22.3
Total votes		85,604	100.0
General election
Democratic	Bill Quirk (incumbent)	114,001	74.3
Republican	Luis A. Wong	39,507	25.7
Total votes		153,508	100.0
Democratic hold			

=== 2014 ===
2014 California State Assembly 20th district election
Primary election
Party	Candidate	Votes	%
Democratic	Bill Quirk (incumbent)	31,882	66.0
Republican	Jaime Patino	11,246	23.3
No party preference	Luis Reynoso	5,186	10.7
Total votes		48,314	100.0
General election
Democratic	Bill Quirk (incumbent)	56,144	71.8
Republican	Jaime Patino	22,007	28.2
Total votes		78,151	100.0
Democratic hold			

=== 2012 ===
2012 California State Assembly 20th district election
Primary election
Party	Candidate	Votes	%
Democratic	Bill Quirk	17,177	30.3
Democratic	Jennifer Ong	14,560	25.7
No party preference	Mark Green	11,490	20.3
Republican	Luis Reynoso	10,041	17.7
Democratic	Sarabjit Kaur Cheema	3,397	6.0
Total votes		56,665	100.0
General election
Democratic	Bill Quirk	67,028	50.3
Democratic	Jennifer Ong	66,111	49.7
Total votes		133,139	100.0
Democratic hold			

=== 2010 ===
2010 California State Assembly 20th district election
Party	Candidate	Votes	%
Democratic	Bob Wieckowski	76,446	72.9
Republican	Adnan Shahab	28,460	27.1
Total votes		104,906	100.0
Democratic hold			

=== 2008 ===
2008 California State Assembly 20th district election
Party	Candidate	Votes	%
Democratic	Alberto Torrico (incumbent)	99,305	71.4
Republican	Jeffrey Wald	39,861	28.6
Total votes		139,166	100.0
Democratic hold			

=== 2006 ===
2006 California State Assembly 20th district election
Party	Candidate	Votes	%
Democratic	Alberto Torrico (incumbent)	61,238	65.3
Republican	Ken Nishimura	32,548	34.7
Total votes		93,786	100.0
Democratic hold			

=== 2004 ===
2004 California State Assembly 20th district election
Party	Candidate	Votes	%
Democratic	Alberto Torrico	87,724	68.6
Republican	Cliff Williams	40,114	31.4
Total votes		127,838	100.0
Democratic hold			

=== 2002 ===
2002 California State Assembly 20th district election
Party	Candidate	Votes	%
Democratic	John A. Dutra (incumbent)	53,304	66.6
Republican	Daniel L. Dow	23,108	28.9
Libertarian	Keith Lyon	3,663	4.5
Total votes		80,075	100.0
Democratic hold			

=== 2000 ===
2000 California State Assembly 20th district election
Party	Candidate	Votes	%
Democratic	John A. Dutra (incumbent)	75,455	64.5
Republican	Lowell King	35,889	30.7
Libertarian	Mark Werlwas	5,709	4.9
Total votes		117,053	100.0
Democratic hold			

=== 1998 ===
1998 California State Assembly 20th district election
Party	Candidate	Votes	%
Democratic	John A. Dutra	52,132	57.7
Republican	Jonelle Joan Zager	38,239	42.3
Total votes		90,371	100.0
Democratic hold			

=== 1996 ===
1996 California State Assembly 20th district election
Party	Candidate	Votes	%
Democratic	Liz Figueroa (incumbent)	70,130	61.3
Republican	Anthony R. Smith	44,270	38.7
Total votes		114,400	100.0
Democratic hold			

=== 1994 ===
1994 California State Assembly 20th district election
Party	Candidate	Votes	%
Democratic	Liz Figueroa	47,498	50.0
Republican	Scott Patrick Haggerty	40,885	43.1
Libertarian	Terry Savage	6,538	6.9
Total votes		94,921	100.0
Democratic hold			

=== 1992 ===
1992 California State Assembly 20th district election
Party	Candidate	Votes	%
Democratic	Delaine Eastin (incumbent)	83,889	64.1
Republican	Lindy G. Batara	47,044	35.9
Total votes		130,933	100.0
Democratic hold			

=== 1990 ===
1990 California State Assembly 20th district election
Party	Candidate	Votes	%
Democratic	Ted Lempert (incumbent)	71,386	63.4
Republican	James R. Rinehart	36,226	32.2
Libertarian	Christopher R. Inama	2,882	2.6
American Independent	Carl R. Sigmund	2,083	1.9
Total votes		112,577	100.0
Democratic hold			

== See also ==
- California State Assembly
- California State Assembly districts
- Districts in California
