= 1990 California Insurance Commissioner election =

1990 California election

- November 6, 1990
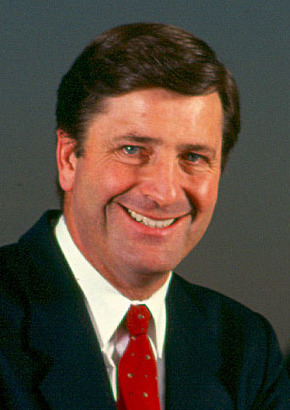

Nominee	John Garamendi	Wes Bannister
Party	Democratic	Republican
Popular vote	3,770,717	2,736,577
Percentage	52.22%	37.90%
- County results Garamendi: 40–50% 50–60% 60–70% Bannister: 40–50% 50–60%
Elected Insurance Commissioner
John Garamendi
Democratic

The 1990 California Insurance Commissioner election occurred on November 6, 1990, with the primary elections taking place on June 5, 1990. The Democratic nominee, John Garamendi, defeated the Republican nominee, Huntington Beach mayor Wes Bannister. Garamendi was the first person elected to the position of Insurance Commissioner due to the passage of Proposition 103 in 1988. Proposition 103 changed the Insurance Commissioner position from a governor-appointed position to an elected position.

== Primary election ==
=== Democratic Party results ===
1990 California Insurance Commissioner Democratic primary
Party	Candidate	Votes	%
Democratic	John Garamendi	849,678	35.52
Democratic	Bill Press	675,273	28.22
Democratic	Conway Collis	398,503	16.66
Democratic	Walter A. Zelman	199,565	8.34
Democratic	Ray Bourhis	118,490	4.95
Democratic	Larry Murphy	79,763	3.33
Democratic	Michael Blanco	71,291	2.98
Total votes		2,392,563	100.00

=== Republican Party results ===
1990 California Insurance Commissioner Republican primary
Party	Candidate	Votes	%
Republican	Wes Bannister	500,461	28.19
Republican	John S. Parise	446,062	25.13
Republican	Thomas A. Scornia	379,721	21.39
Republican	John L. "Jack" Harden	330,825	18.64
Republican	Joseph D. Dunlop	118,121	6.65
Total votes		1,775,190	100.00

=== Peace and Freedom Party results ===
1990 California Insurance Commissioner Peace and Freedom primary
Party	Candidate	Votes	%
Peace and Freedom	Tom Condit	3,084	57.11
Peace and Freedom	B. Kwaku Duren	2,316	42.89
Total votes		5,400	100.00

=== Libertarian Party results ===
1990 California Insurance Commissioner Libertarian primary
Party	Candidate	Votes	%
Libertarian	Ted Brown	11,663	100.00
Total votes		11,663	100.00

== General election ==
=== Results ===
1990 California Insurance Commissioner general election
Party	Candidate	Votes	%
Democratic	John Garamendi	3,770,717	52.22
Republican	Wes Bannister	2,736,577	37.90
Libertarian	Ted Brown	431,317	5.97
Peace and Freedom	Tom Condit	281,276	3.90
No party	John J. "Jack" Harden (write-in)	553	0.01
No party	Eli Green (write-in)	68	0.00
Total votes		7,220,508	100.00
Democratic win (new seat)			

=== Results by county ===
County	Garamendi (D)		Bannister (R)		Brown (L)		Condit (P&F)		Write-in (WI)		Totals
County	Votes	%	Votes	%	Votes	%	Votes	%	Votes	%	Votes
Alameda	218,629	63.86%	88,033	25.71%	19,137	5.59%	16,542	4.83%	11	0.00%	342,352
Alpine	198	46.59%	169	39.76%	36	8.47%	22	5.18%	0	0.00%	425
Amador	6,191	52.33%	4,483	37.90%	794	6.71%	362	3.06%	0	0.00%	11,830
Butte	29,549	49.21%	24,859	41.40%	3,930	6.55%	1,706	2.84%	0	0.00%	60,044
Calaveras	6,683	52.24%	4,556	35.61%	1,084	8.47%	471	3.68%	0	0.00%	12,794
Colusa	2,034	47.71%	1,906	44.71%	233	5.47%	90	2.11%	0	0.00%	4,263
Contra Costa	138,378	55.28%	88,947	35.54%	15,391	6.15%	7,583	3.03%	8	0.00%	250,307
Del Norte	2,877	44.45%	2,869	44.33%	428	6.61%	298	4.60%	0	0.00%	6,472
El Dorado	22,434	49.17%	19,121	41.91%	2,624	5.75%	1,444	3.17%	0	0.00%	45,623
Fresno	75,624	53.96%	52,586	37.52%	6,035	4.31%	5,905	3.64%	1	0.00%	140,151
Glenn	3,021	43.85%	3,215	46.67%	434	6.30%	219	3.18%	0	0.00%	6,889
Humboldt	22,831	50.47%	16,228	35.87%	3,104	6.86%	3,074	6.80%	1	0.00%	45,238
Imperial	8,441	49.32%	6,996	40.88%	888	5.19%	819	4.79%	0	0.00%	17,114
Inyo	3,317	47.68%	3,099	44.55%	354	5.09%	187	2.69%	0	0.00%	6,957
Kern	55,068	47.40%	51,741	44.54%	6,346	5.46%	3,011	2.59%	5	0.00%	116,171
Kings	8,379	51.04%	6,691	40.76%	844	5.14%	502	3.06%	0	0.00%	16,416
Lake	9,385	55.17%	5,814	34.18%	1,184	6.96%	625	3.67%	3	0.02%	17,011
Lassen	3,795	47.35%	3,229	40.29%	623	7.77%	368	4.59%	0	0.00%	8,015
Los Angeles	1,012,783	57.15%	601,552	33.94%	88,452	4.99%	69,291	4.02%	198	0.11%	1,772,276
Madera	9,103	49.02%	7,868	42.37%	971	5.23%	627	3.38%	0	0.00%	18,569
Marin	49,327	55.51%	29,958	33.71%	5,650	6.36%	3,931	4.42%	1	0.00%	88,867
Mariposa	3,043	48.99%	2,404	38.71%	401	6.46%	363	5.84%	0	0.00%	6,211
Mendocino	12,305	46.01%	9,360	35.00%	2,239	8.37%	2,841	10.62%	1	0.00%	26,746
Merced	15,180	49.75%	10,649	34.90%	1,610	5.28%	3,074	10.07%	0	0.00%	30,513
Modoc	1,433	41.56%	1,598	46.35%	268	7.77%	149	4.32%	0	0.00%	3,448
Mono	1,464	49.93%	1,182	40.31%	188	6.41%	98	3.34%	0	0.00%	2,932
Monterey	38,259	49.65%	30,685	39.82%	5,209	6.76%	2,909	3.77%	4	0.00%	77,062
Napa	18,479	49.10%	15,198	40.39%	2,426	6.45%	1,529	4.06%	0	0.00%	37,632
Nevada	14,797	45.23%	14,583	44.57%	2,266	6.93%	1,070	3.27%	1	0.00%	32,717
Orange	251,088	40.22%	321,873	51.56%	35,490	10.94%	15,784	2.53%	72	0.01%	624,307
Placer	29,366	47.78%	26,488	43.09%	3,695	6.01%	1,908	3.10%	10	0.02%	61,467
Plumas	4,114	53.16%	2,846	36.77%	516	6.67%	263	3.40%	0	0.00%	7,739
Riverside	129,403	49.36%	112,709	42.99%	12,559	4.79%	7,490	2.86%	1	0.00%	262,162
Sacramento	181,103	56.12%	114,735	35.56%	16,316	5.06%	10,494	3.25%	31	0.01%	322,679
San Benito	4,014	48.73%	3,242	39.35%	588	7.14%	394	4.78%	0	0.00%	8,238
San Bernardino	147,030	50.47%	118,131	40.55%	16,197	5.56%	9,957	3.42%	24	0.01%	291,339
San Diego	244,820	39.26%	297,963	47.79%	53,537	8.59%	27,099	4.35%	114	0.02%	623,533
San Francisco	124,648	67.70%	32,423	17.61%	14,001	7.61%	13,042	7.08%	2	0.00%	184,116
San Joaquin	63,668	58.06%	38,148	34.79%	4,589	4.18%	3,257	2.97%	1	0.00%	109,663
San Luis Obispo	32,848	48.19%	28,961	42.48%	4,083	5.99%	2,275	3.34%	3	0.00%	68,170
San Mateo	95,746	54.92%	58,100	33.33%	13,585	7.79%	6,905	3.96%	1	0.00%	174,337
Santa Barbara	51,459	49.95%	41,987	40.76%	6,282	6.10%	3,202	3.11%	85	0.08%	103,015
Santa Clara	205,683	52.93%	139,117	35.80%	28,252	7.27%	15,526	4.00%	3	0.00%	388,581
Santa Cruz	44,955	59.44%	20,799	27.50%	5,317	7.03%	4,557	6.03%	1	0.00%	75,629
Shasta	20,410	43.57%	21,605	46.12%	3,156	6.74%	1,677	3.58%	0	0.00%	46,848
Sierra	795	52.65%	543	35.96%	114	7.55%	58	3.84%	0	0.00%	1,510
Siskiyou	6,764	45.90%	6,221	42.22%	1,068	7.25%	682	4.63%	0	0.00%	14,735
Solano	47,589	57.53%	26,667	32.24%	5,165	6.24%	3,300	3.99%	0	0.00%	82,721
Sonoma	70,432	53.40%	44,120	33.45%	9,271	7.03%	8,046	6.10%	33	0.03%	131,902
Stanislaus	47,825	56.77%	27,984	33.22%	3,879	4.61%	4,553	5.40%	0	0.00%	84,241
Sutter	7,978	43.45%	9,063	49.36%	891	4.85%	429	2.34%	0	0.00%	18,361
Tehama	6,919	44.60%	6,509	41.95%	1,459	9.40%	628	4.05%	0	0.00%	15,515
Trinity	2,329	44.19%	2,154	40.87%	468	8.88%	320	6.07%	0	0.00%	5,271
Tulare	30,982	49.72%	26,821	43.04%	2,765	4.44%	1,747	2.80%	0	0.00%	62,315
Tuolumne	10,720	55.81%	6,517	33.93%	1,184	6.16%	788	4.10%	0	0.00%	19,209
Ventura	84,155	48.09%	74,415	42.53%	10,848	6.20%	5,558	3.18%	5	0.00%	174,981
Yolo	25,158	60.91%	12,331	29.86%	1,940	4.70%	1,871	4.53%	1	0.00%	41,301
Yuba	5,709	48.08%	5,056	42.58%	753	6.34%	356	3.00%	0	0.00%	11,874
Totals	3,770,717	52.22%	2,736,577	37.90%	431,317	5.97%	281,276	3.90%	621	0.01%	7,220,508
