= 2002 California Insurance Commissioner election =

- November 5, 2002
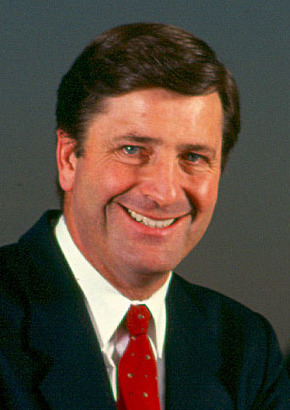

| Nominee | John Garamendi | Gary Mendoza |
| Party | Democratic | Republican |
| Popular vote | 3,346,937 | 2,998,243 |
| Percentage | 46.48% | 41.64% |
- County results Garamendi: 40–50% 50–60% 60–70% 70–80% Mendoza: 40–50% 50–60% 60–70%
Ins. Comm. before election
Harry W. Low
Democratic
Elected Ins. Comm.
John Garamendi
Democratic

The 2002 California Insurance Commissioner election occurred on November 5, 2002. The primary elections took place on March 5, 2002. Former Deputy Secretary of the Interior John Garamendi, the Democratic nominee, defeated Corporations Commissioner Gary Mendoza, the Republican nominee, for the office previously held by Harry W. Low.

== Primary results ==
A bar graph of statewide results in this contest are available at https://web.archive.org/web/20080905210236/http://primary2002.ss.ca.gov/Returns/ins/00.htm.

Results by county are available here and here.

=== Democratic ===
California Insurance Commissioner Democratic primary, 2002
| Candidate | Votes | % |
|---|---|---|
| John Garamendi | 800,146 | 38.55 |
| Tom Umberg | 586,112 | 28.24 |
| Tom Calderon | 476,234 | 22.94 |
| Bill Winslow | 213,239 | 10.27 |
| Total votes | 2,075,731 | 100.00 |

=== Republican ===
California Insurance Commissioner Republican primary, 2002
| Candidate | Votes | % |
|---|---|---|
| Gary Mendoza | 808,007 | 41.74 |
| Stefan "Watchdog" Stitch | 704,392 | 36.39 |
| Wes Bannister | 423,273 | 21.87 |
| Total votes | 1,935,672 | 100.00 |

=== Other Parties ===
California Attorney General primary, 2002 (Others)
| Party | Candidate | Votes | % |
|---|---|---|---|
| Green | David I. Sheidlower | 34,784 | 100.00 |
| American Independent | Steve Klein | 27,113 | 100.00 |
| Libertarian | Dale F. Ogden | 19,213 | 100.00 |
| Natural Law | Raul Calderon, Jr. | 5,044 | 100.00 |

== Results ==
California Insurance Commissioner election, 2002
| Party | Candidate | Votes | % |
|---|---|---|---|
| Democratic | John Garamendi | 3,346,937 | 46.48 |
| Republican | Gary Mendoza | 2,998,243 | 41.64 |
| Green | David I. Sheidlower | 277,667 | 3.86 |
| Libertarian | Dale F. Ogden | 236,688 | 3.29 |
| Natural Law | Raul Calderon, Jr. | 192,001 | 2.67 |
| American Independent | Steve Klein | 148,893 | 2.07 |
| Invalid or blank votes | | 538,392 | 6.96 |
| Total votes | | 7,200,429 | 100.00 |
| Turnout | | | 36.05 |
| Democratic hold | | | |

=== Results by county ===
Results from the Secretary of State of California:

| County | Garamendi | Votes | Mendoza | Votes | Sheidlower | Votes | Ogden | Votes | Calderon | Votes | Klein | Votes |
|---|---|---|---|---|---|---|---|---|---|---|---|---|
| San Francisco | 70.15% | 137,602 | 15.26% | 29,931 | 7.78% | 15,261 | 3.23% | 6,342 | 2.16% | 4,231 | 1.42% | 2,777 |
| Alameda | 64.79% | 214,588 | 21.93% | 72,635 | 7.28% | 24,111 | 2.75% | 9,109 | 1.99% | 6,606 | 1.26% | 4,169 |
| Marin | 60.31% | 51,967 | 27.33% | 23,551 | 7.64% | 6,587 | 2.63% | 2,265 | 1.16% | 996 | 0.93% | 799 |
| San Mateo | 58.90% | 97,857 | 29.56% | 49,102 | 4.54% | 7,550 | 3.02% | 5,012 | 2.44% | 4,058 | 1.54% | 2,555 |
| Santa Cruz | 55.31% | 41,663 | 26.17% | 19,709 | 10.60% | 7,981 | 3.64% | 2,744 | 2.68% | 2,015 | 1.61% | 1,210 |
| Contra Costa | 55.05% | 141,101 | 34.45% | 88,318 | 3.64% | 9,318 | 3.03% | 7,771 | 2.00% | 5,133 | 1.83% | 4,689 |
| Sonoma | 54.01% | 76,818 | 30.16% | 42,896 | 8.75% | 12,450 | 3.30% | 4,699 | 2.09% | 2,966 | 1.69% | 2,400 |
| Los Angeles | 53.87% | 871,779 | 33.70% | 545,306 | 3.39% | 54,880 | 3.33% | 53,894 | 3.58% | 57,993 | 2.12% | 34,301 |
| Solano | 53.30% | 46,090 | 36.77% | 31,795 | 2.95% | 2,555 | 2.73% | 2,365 | 2.13% | 1,840 | 2.12% | 1,829 |
| Santa Clara | 52.64% | 179,291 | 35.02% | 119,261 | 4.20% | 14,308 | 3.85% | 13,125 | 2.56% | 8,731 | 1.72% | 5,874 |
| Napa | 51.96% | 18,738 | 35.94% | 12,959 | 5.34% | 1,924 | 2.78% | 1,001 | 2.27% | 818 | 1.72% | 619 |
| Monterey | 51.20% | 43,418 | 35.66% | 30,243 | 3.64% | 3,087 | 3.38% | 2,865 | 3.81% | 3,230 | 2.31% | 1,961 |
| Yolo | 49.52% | 22,585 | 36.87% | 16,817 | 7.23% | 3,297 | 2.15% | 979 | 2.66% | 1,212 | 1.57% | 718 |
| Lake | 49.11% | 7,734 | 39.78% | 6,265 | 4.92% | 775 | 2.77% | 436 | 1.57% | 247 | 1.85% | 292 |
| San Benito | 48.59% | 5,894 | 39.31% | 4,769 | 2.79% | 338 | 3.02% | 366 | 4.47% | 542 | 1.83% | 222 |
| Mendocino | 48.49% | 11,746 | 31.23% | 7,566 | 13.56% | 3,284 | 3.03% | 735 | 1.77% | 428 | 1.93% | 467 |
| Alpine | 47.22% | 255 | 37.41% | 202 | 5.37% | 29 | 3.70% | 20 | 3.89% | 21 | 2.41% | 13 |
| Imperial | 47.15% | 10,085 | 39.33% | 8,412 | 1.48% | 317 | 2.41% | 515 | 7.48% | 1,600 | 2.15% | 459 |
| San Joaquin | 46.46% | 57,005 | 44.94% | 55,139 | 2.04% | 2,505 | 2.10% | 2,583 | 2.51% | 3,080 | 1.95% | 2,396 |
| Humboldt | 44.86% | 18,484 | 35.14% | 14,479 | 13.18% | 5,432 | 4.04% | 1,666 | 1.90% | 783 | 0.88% | 364 |
| Merced | 43.52% | 17,284 | 47.00% | 18,666 | 1.80% | 716 | 2.48% | 983 | 3.39% | 1,346 | 1.81% | 717 |
| Sacramento | 42.44% | 131,133 | 46.71% | 144,312 | 3.85% | 11,887 | 2.76% | 8,513 | 2.15% | 6,637 | 2.10% | 6,485 |
| Stanislaus | 42.30% | 40,205 | 49.67% | 47,214 | 2.02% | 1,924 | 1.96% | 1,866 | 2.27% | 2,157 | 1.77% | 1,684 |
| Del Norte | 42.10% | 2,787 | 45.50% | 3,012 | 3.87% | 256 | 3.87% | 256 | 2.05% | 136 | 2.61% | 173 |
| Tuolumne | 40.43% | 7,223 | 50.81% | 9,078 | 3.26% | 582 | 2.40% | 429 | 1.35% | 242 | 1.74% | 311 |
| Santa Barbara | 40.45% | 44,056 | 46.04% | 50,143 | 5.37% | 5,847 | 3.74% | 4,073 | 2.71% | 2,949 | 1.70% | 1,850 |
| Trinity | 40.42% | 1,908 | 44.46% | 2,099 | 5.57% | 263 | 5.10% | 241 | 2.03% | 96 | 2.41% | 114 |
| Ventura | 40.38% | 76,598 | 47.68% | 90,429 | 3.02% | 5,734 | 3.68% | 6,976 | 2.90% | 5,496 | 2.34% | 4,442 |
| Calaveras | 40.05% | 6,059 | 49.71% | 7,519 | 3.70% | 560 | 3.06% | 463 | 1.49% | 226 | 1.98% | 300 |
| Mono | 39.86% | 1,159 | 48.28% | 1,404 | 5.33% | 155 | 2.92% | 85 | 2.03% | 59 | 1.58% | 46 |
| San Bernardino | 39.56% | 107,649 | 48.60% | 132,269 | 2.34% | 6,366 | 3.49% | 9,508 | 3.27% | 8,891 | 2.74% | 7,452 |
| Amador | 39.13% | 5,054 | 51.12% | 6,603 | 2.87% | 371 | 2.71% | 350 | 1.83% | 237 | 2.34% | 302 |
| Riverside | 39.19% | 116,658 | 50.72% | 150,956 | 1.98% | 5,906 | 3.20% | 9,535 | 2.57% | 7,654 | 2.33% | 6,932 |
| Tehama | 38.07% | 5,774 | 51.43% | 7,800 | 2.12% | 322 | 3.62% | 549 | 1.72% | 261 | 3.03% | 459 |
| Kings | 37.57% | 7,891 | 53.31% | 11,195 | 1.59% | 334 | 2.56% | 537 | 3.04% | 639 | 1.93% | 405 |
| Siskiyou | 37.33% | 5,631 | 51.21% | 7,724 | 2.94% | 443 | 4.73% | 713 | 1.94% | 293 | 1.86% | 280 |
| San Luis Obispo | 36.32% | 28,697 | 50.42% | 39,837 | 5.31% | 4,192 | 3.95% | 3,125 | 1.99% | 1,575 | 2.01% | 1,591 |
| San Diego | 35.98% | 225,666 | 52.46% | 328,990 | 3.03% | 18,991 | 3.80% | 23,810 | 2.42% | 15,172 | 2.31% | 14,507 |
| Inyo | 35.70% | 2,191 | 53.09% | 3,258 | 3.18% | 195 | 3.70% | 227 | 1.76% | 108 | 2.57% | 158 |
| Kern | 35.41% | 47,632 | 54.35% | 73,106 | 1.56% | 2,104 | 2.97% | 3,996 | 2.52% | 3,393 | 3.19% | 4,287 |
| Shasta | 35.21% | 16,743 | 55.57% | 26,426 | 2.18% | 1,038 | 3.05% | 1,452 | 1.66% | 789 | 2.33% | 1,110 |
| Butte | 35.23% | 21,119 | 50.79% | 30,445 | 6.86% | 4,113 | 2.81% | 1,685 | 1.82% | 1,089 | 2.49% | 1,492 |
| Plumas | 35.24% | 2,729 | 53.07% | 4,109 | 3.63% | 281 | 3.65% | 283 | 1.69% | 131 | 2.71% | 210 |
| Mariposa | 35.01% | 2,205 | 54.37% | 3,425 | 3.51% | 221 | 3.08% | 194 | 1.62% | 102 | 2.41% | 152 |
| Fresno | 34.97% | 52,946 | 55.03% | 83,308 | 2.16% | 3,263 | 3.23% | 4,896 | 2.56% | 3,874 | 2.05% | 3,099 |
| Lassen | 34.88% | 2,631 | 54.38% | 4,102 | 2.17% | 164 | 4.02% | 303 | 1.75% | 132 | 2.80% | 211 |
| Modoc | 34.61% | 1,136 | 55.48% | 1,821 | 1.98% | 65 | 3.50% | 115 | 1.52% | 50 | 2.89% | 95 |
| Colusa | 34.20% | 1,538 | 57.42% | 2,582 | 1.89% | 85 | 2.00% | 90 | 2.54% | 114 | 1.96% | 88 |
| Nevada | 34.11% | 13,106 | 52.23% | 20,071 | 7.18% | 2,758 | 2.96% | 1,139 | 1.69% | 650 | 1.83% | 702 |
| Orange | 33.33% | 208,490 | 55.51% | 347,198 | 2.45% | 15,308 | 3.86% | 24,149 | 2.42% | 15,141 | 2.43% | 15,195 |
| Sierra | 32.84% | 465 | 53.11% | 752 | 5.01% | 71 | 4.80% | 68 | 1.34% | 19 | 2.90% | 41 |
| Madera | 32.70% | 8,446 | 57.79% | 14,925 | 2.03% | 525 | 2.87% | 742 | 2.45% | 634 | 2.14% | 553 |
| Yuba | 32.57% | 3,727 | 56.23% | 6,434 | 2.84% | 325 | 3.50% | 401 | 2.05% | 235 | 2.81% | 321 |
| Glenn | 32.37% | 2,068 | 57.76% | 3,690 | 1.83% | 117 | 2.85% | 182 | 1.86% | 119 | 3.33% | 213 |
| El Dorado | 32.23% | 17,674 | 57.13% | 31,327 | 4.04% | 2,213 | 2.82% | 1,549 | 1.75% | 958 | 2.04% | 1,118 |
| Sutter | 32.11% | 6,105 | 60.02% | 11,409 | 1.75% | 333 | 2.07% | 394 | 2.01% | 383 | 2.03% | 386 |
| Tulare | 32.08% | 19,648 | 57.23% | 35,057 | 1.68% | 1,032 | 2.94% | 1,801 | 3.31% | 2,029 | 2.76% | 1,688 |
| Placer | 31.93% | 30,206 | 59.40% | 56,193 | 2.77% | 2,618 | 2.66% | 2,518 | 1.54% | 1,455 | 1.70% | 1,610 |

== See also ==
- California state elections, 2002
- State of California
- California Insurance Commissioner
