= Ted Lempert =

American politician

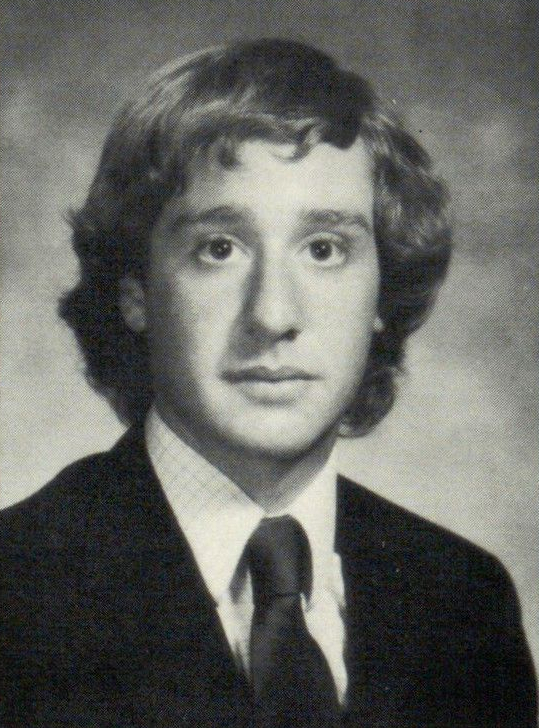
- Lempert in the Princeton University yearbook, 1983

Member of the California State Assembly from the 21st district
- In office December 2, 1996 – November 30, 2000
- Preceded by: Byron Sher
- Succeeded by: Joe Simitian

Member of the California State Assembly from the 20th district
- In office December 5, 1988 – November 30, 1992
- Preceded by: Bill Duplissea
- Succeeded by: Delaine Eastin

Personal details
- Born: June 14, 1961 (age 65) San Mateo, California, U.S.
- Party: Democratic
- Spouse: Nicole Bergeron
- Education: Princeton University; Stanford University
- Occupation: Politician

Edward "Ted" Lempert (born June 14, 1961, San Mateo, California) is a Democratic politician who served two stints in the California State Assembly from 1988 until 1992 and from 1996 until he was term limited in 2000. Lempert represented the Peninsula subregion of the San Francisco Bay Area. Lempert is the President of Children Now and was CEO and founder of EdVoice. Both organizations advocate for changes to the California educational system. Lempert is a trustee on the San Mateo County Board of Education representing Trustee Area.

== Legislative accomplishments ==
Lempert authored legislation during his eight years in the Assembly, including the Lempert-Keene Oil Spill Prevention & Response Act (1990), the Golden State Scholarshare Trust (California’s College Savings Plan) (1997), the Internet Tax Freedom Act (1998) and the Local School Construction Bond Act (2000). He had more than 70 other bills signed by Governors George Deukmejian, Pete Wilson and Gray Davis.

== 1988 Election ==
Lempert defeated one term incumbent Assemblyman Bill Duplissea.

== 1992 Election ==
The Peninsula lost a legislative seat following the 1990 reapportionment and incumbent congressman Tom Campbell was running for a vacant US Senate Seat. Therefore, Lempert ran in the Democratic primary to succeed Campbell, a Republican. Lempert ended up losing the primary to San Mateo County supervisor Anna Eshoo.

== San Mateo County Board of Supervisors ==
After Eshoo was elected to Congress, Lempert replaced her on the Board of Supervisors, from 1993 until he resigned in 1996 having been elected to the Assembly. Lempert was the chair of the Board in 1995.

== 1996 Election ==
Lempert returned to the Assembly in 1996, representing the 21st district after longtime incumbent Byron Sher who represented much of the territory that had been previously Lempert's was term limited.

== 2004 Election ==
Lempert ran for the 11th state senate district in 2004 following the term limitation of Byron Sher. Lempert lost the primary to Joe Simitian, the man who had succeeded Lempert in the Assembly.

== Personal ==
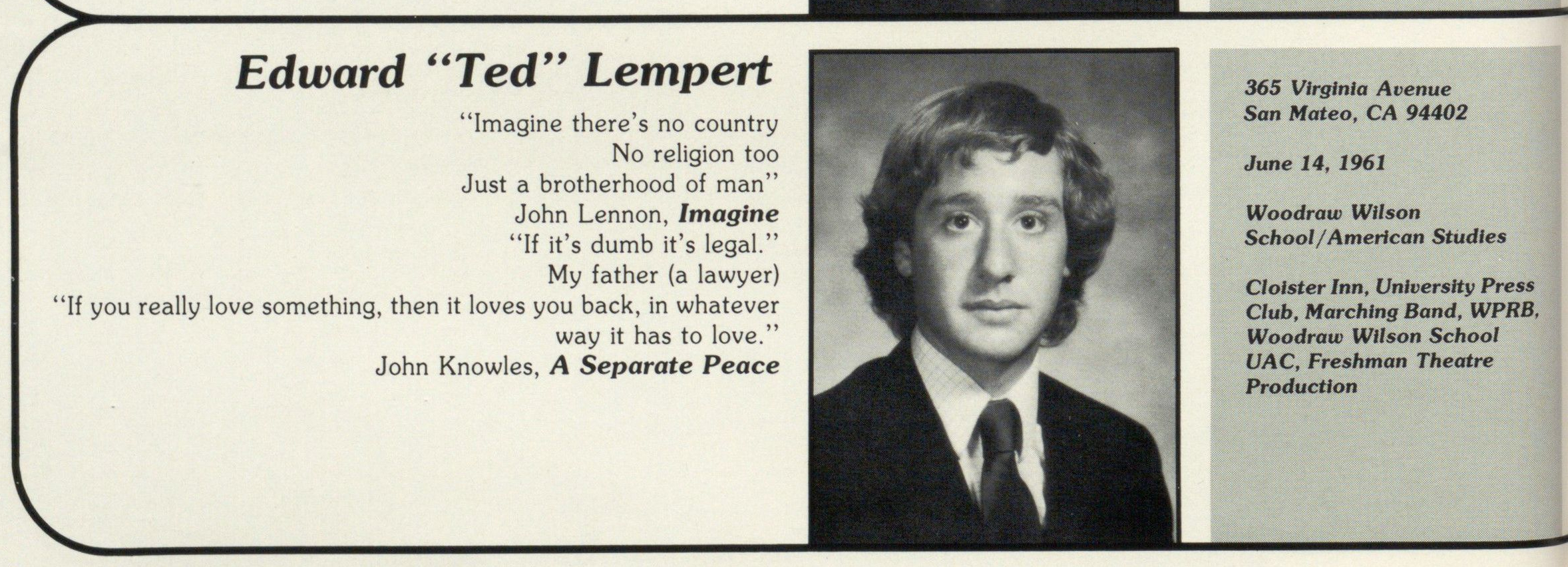
Lempert in the Princeton University yearbook, 1983

A lifelong resident of the San Francisco Peninsula, Mr. Lempert attended local public schools. He graduated from Princeton University’s Woodrow Wilson School of Public and International Affairs and earned his law degree from Stanford University.

He, his wife Nicole, and their three daughters live in San Carlos, California. He teaches Political Science 171: California Politics at the University of California at Berkeley. Lempert is a member of the board of trustees of the Junior State of America. He is Jewish.
