= Frank R. Devlin =

American politician (1867–1945)

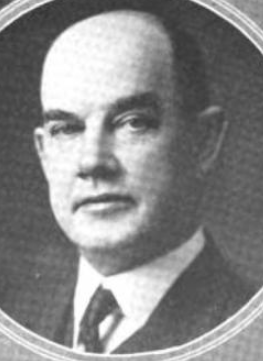

Member of the California State Assembly from the 20th district
- In office January 2, 1905 - January 4, 1909
- Preceded by: W. S. Killingsworth
- Succeeded by: John Roche Cronin

Personal details
- Born: Frank Raymond Devlin; October 27, 1867 Windsor, Ontario, Canada
- Died: August 25, 1945 (aged 77) Berkeley, California, United States
- Party: Republican
- Occupation: Lawyer, politician

Frank Raymond Devlin (October 27, 1867 – August 25, 1945) was a Canadian-American lawyer and politician.

== Biography ==
Frank R. Devlin was born in Windsor, Ontario on October 27, 1867, and grew up in Vallejo, California.

He was elected to the California State Assembly in 1904, serving for two terms.

He was appointed to the California Board of Railroad Commissioners by Governor Hiram Johnson on January 3, 1915.

He died at his home in Berkeley on August 25, 1945.
