= Liz Ortega =

American politician (born 1977)

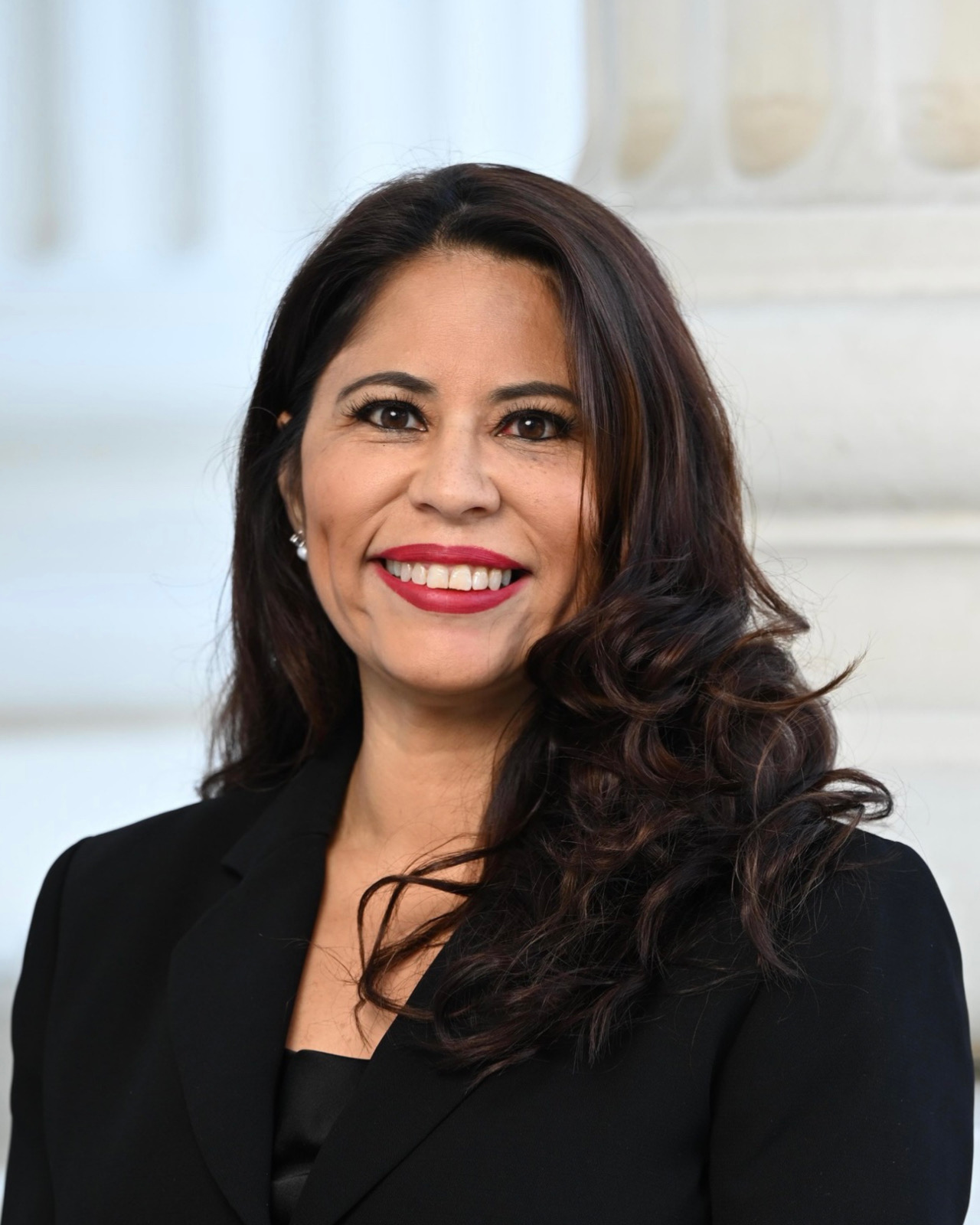

Member of the California State Assembly from the 20th district
- Incumbent
- Assumed office December 5, 2022
- Preceded by: Bill Quirk

Personal details
- Born: Elizabeth Ortega; August 26, 1977 (age 49) Guadalajara, Jalisco, Mexico
- Party: Democratic
- Spouse: Jason Toro (m. 2000)
- Children: 4
- Education: University of Phoenix (BS)
- Profession: Labor executive
- Website: Official website Campaign website

Elizabeth Ortega-Toro (née Ortega; born August 26, 1977) is an American politician and labor executive who is a member of the California State Assembly from the 20th district since 2022. A member of the Democratic Party, her district includes the southern East Bay of the San Francisco Bay Area.

Born in Guadalajara, Mexico, Ortega immigrated to the United States at age three and was raised in Oakland. She has a bachelor of science from the University of Phoenix. She served as the statewide political director for AFSCME Local 3299 before becoming the first Latina elected to serve as the executive secretary-treasurer of the Alameda Labor Council, a central labor council that represents all labor unions in Alameda County.

Ortega was first elected to the Assembly in 2022, defeating Dublin City Councilmember Shawn Kumagai. She assumed office on December 5, 2022.

== Early life and education ==
Ortega was born in Mexico on August 26, 1977. Her family is from the Guadalajara area. Ortega immigrated to the United States at age three with her mother and brother; her father had already immigrated to the United States. They crossed the border in San Diego and moved to the Fruitvale neighborhood of Oakland, where Ortega was raised and attended public school.

Ortega attended the University of Phoenix at its Oakland campus. She graduated with a bachelor of science in criminal justice administration in 2009.

== Labor career ==
Ortega began her labor career as a receptionist for SEIU in 2001. She later became an education trainer for SEIU and was eventually promoted to assistant director of Education and Nursing Homes. In 2011, she became political director for the Alameda Labor Council, an AFL-CIO-affiliated central labor council that represents all labor unions in Alameda County, from 2011 to 2013.

In 2013, Ortega joined AFSCME Local 3299 as its statewide political director. As statewide political director, she was based in Sacramento and lobbied the California State Legislature for the successful passage of legislation to protect essential service jobs at all University of California campuses.

Ortega returned to the Alameda Labor Council in 2017 as its Executive Secretary-Treasurer. She was the first Latina to serve in that position.

== California State Assembly ==
=== Tenure ===
Ortega was sworn in on December 5, 2022. She represents the 20th district, which includes the Alameda County communities of San Leandro, Union City, Hayward, Castro Valley, San Lorenzo, Cherryland, Ashland, and parts of Dublin and Pleasanton.

Ortega is a member of the California Legislative Progressive Caucus.

== Electoral history ==
2022 California State Assembly 20th district election
Primary election
Party	Candidate	Votes	%
Democratic	Liz Ortega	23,503	32.2
Democratic	Shawn Kumagai	17,481	23.9
Democratic	Jennifer Esteen	16,211	22.2
Republican	Joseph Grcar	15,869	21.7
Total votes		73,064	100.0
General election
Democratic	Liz Ortega	68,853	62.1
Democratic	Shawn Kumagai	41,917	37.9
Total votes		110,770	100.0
Democratic hold			

2024 California State Assembly 20th district election
Primary election
Party	Candidate	Votes	%
Democratic	Liz Ortega (incumbent)	57,083	99.3
Republican	Sangeetha Shanbhogue (write-in)	284	0.5
Republican	Joseph Grcar (write-in)	116	0.2
Total votes		57,483	100.0
General election
Democratic	Liz Ortega (incumbent)	126,615	72.9
Republican	Sangeetha Shanbhogue	47,060	27.1
Total votes		173,675	100.0
Democratic hold			

== Personal life ==
Ortega is married to Jason Toro. They have four children together and live in San Leandro.
