= John Garamendi =

American businessman & politician (born 1945)

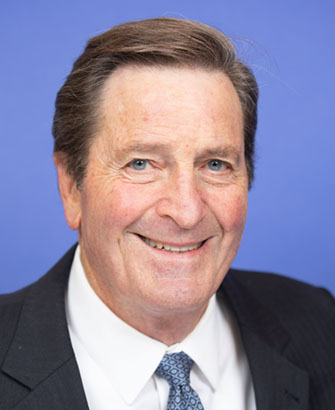
- Garamendi in 2022

Member of the U.S. House of Representatives from California
- Incumbent
- Assumed office November 3, 2009 (Note: Garamendi's official service begins on the date of the special election, while he was not sworn in until November 5, 2009.)
- Preceded by: Ellen Tauscher
- Constituency: 10th district (2009–2013); 3rd district (2013–2023); 8th district (2023–present)

46th Lieutenant Governor of California
- In office January 8, 2007 – November 3, 2009
- Governor: Arnold Schwarzenegger
- Preceded by: Cruz Bustamante
- Succeeded by: Mona Pasquil (acting)

Insurance Commissioner of California
- In office January 6, 2003 – January 8, 2007
- Governor: Gray Davis; Arnold Schwarzenegger
- Preceded by: Harry Low
- Succeeded by: Steve Poizner
- In office January 7, 1991 – January 2, 1995
- Governor: Pete Wilson
- Preceded by: Roxanni Gillespie
- Succeeded by: Chuck Quackenbush

1st United States Deputy Secretary of the Interior
- In office August 15, 1995 – April 1998
- President: Bill Clinton
- Preceded by: Position established
- Succeeded by: David J. Hayes

Member of the California Senate
- In office December 3, 1976 – November 30, 1990
- Preceded by: Al Alquist
- Succeeded by: Patrick Johnston
- Constituency: 13th district (1976–1984); 5th district (1984–1990)

Member of the California State Assembly from the 7th district
- In office December 7, 1974 – November 30, 1976
- Preceded by: Bill Bagley
- Succeeded by: Norman S. Waters

Personal details
- Born: John Raymond Garamendi; January 24, 1945 (age 81) Camp Blanding, Florida, U.S.
- Party: Democratic
- Spouse: Patricia Wilkinson (m. 1965)
- Children: 6
- Education: University of California, Berkeley (BA); Harvard University (MBA)
- Website: House website Campaign website
- Garamendi's voice Garamendi on the significance of the Affordable Care Act. Recorded June 28, 2012

John Raymond Garamendi (/ˌɡærəˈmɛndi/ GARR-ə-MEN-dee; born January 24, 1945) is an American businessman, politician and member of the Democratic Party who has represented areas of Northern California between San Francisco and Sacramento, including the cities of Fairfield and Vacaville in the United States House of Representatives since 2009. Garamendi was the California insurance commissioner from 1991 to 1995 and 2003 to 2007, the U.S. Deputy Secretary of the Interior from 1995 to 1998, and the 46th lieutenant governor of California from 2007 until his election to Congress in late 2009.

Garamendi was born in Camp Blanding, Florida and raised in Mokelumne Hill, California. He earned a B.A. in business from the University of California, Berkeley and an MBA from Harvard Business School then served in the Peace Corps in Ethiopia from 1966 to 1968. He was elected to the California State Assembly in 1974, serving a single term before being elected in 1976 to the California State Senate where he served four terms until 1990. During this time he had a stint as Majority Leader and ran unsuccessfully for the Democratic nominations for governor of California in 1982 and California State Controller in 1986.

In 1990, Garamendi became the first elected California insurance commissioner, serving from 1991 to 1995. He ran for governor in the 1994 election, losing in the Democratic primary. He left elective office and served as President Bill Clinton's deputy secretary of the interior from 1995 to 1998 then worked for the Peace Corps again. He was elected insurance commissioner again in 2002 and briefly ran for governor again in the 2003 recall, before dropping out to support Lieutenant Governor Cruz Bustamante. In 2006, he was elected lieutenant governor to succeed the term-limited Bustamante.

Garamendi had planned to run for governor a fourth time in 2010, but after U.S. Representative Ellen Tauscher of California's 10th congressional district resigned, Garamendi won the November 2009 special election to succeed her.

== Early life and education ==
Garamendi was born in Camp Blanding, Florida, and was raised in Mokelumne Hill, California. Both his father and his paternal grandfather ultimately moved back to the Basque Country in the 1960s.

Garamendi received a Bachelor of Arts in business from the University of California, Berkeley, where he was a football offensive guard and wrestler, and a Master of Business Administration degree from Harvard Business School. He served in the Peace Corps in Ethiopia from 1966 to 1968. Garamendi is an Eagle Scout and a member of Sigma Chi, as a brother of the Alpha Beta Chapter at Berkeley.

== California legislature (1974–1991) ==
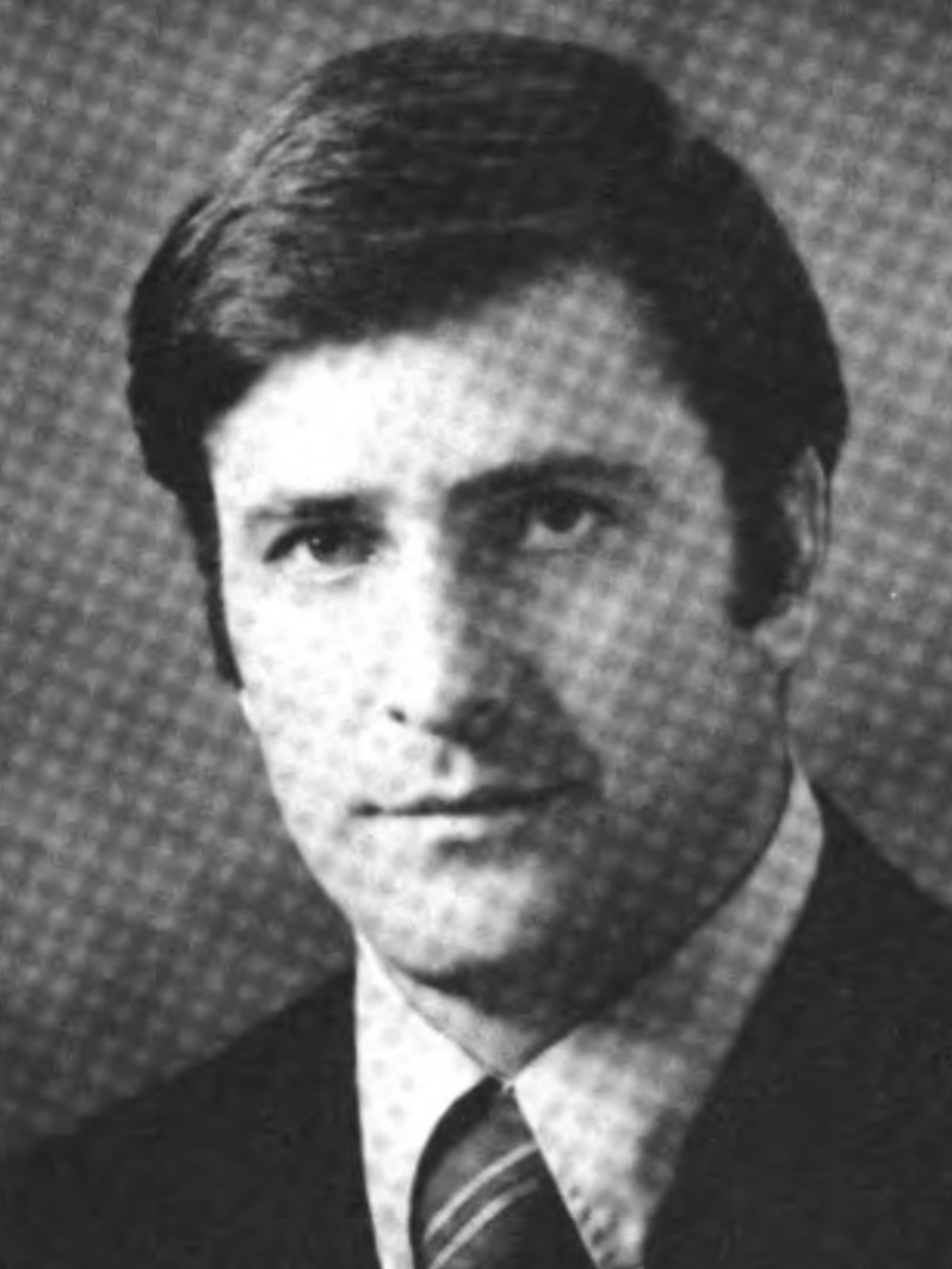
Garamendi in the State Assembly in 1975.

=== State Assembly ===
In 1974, Garamendi decided to run for California's 7th State Assembly district. Six-term Republican incumbent William T. Bagley did not run for reelection, instead running unsuccessfully for California State Controller. In the election to succeed Bagley, Garamendi faced Republican State Assemblyman Douglas F. Carter, who had won a special election in the 12th Assembly district in July 1973 to succeed Robert T. Monagan. In the general election, Garamendi defeated Carter, 60,380 votes (64.08%) to 33,842 (35.92%), as Democrats won a supermajority in the California State Assembly for the first time since the 1800s.

=== State Senate ===
After one term in the Assembly, Garamendi decided to run for California's 13th State Senate district in 1976. He defeated Republican Bob Whitten, 53% to 47%. He was reelected in 1980 (60%), 1984 (69%), and 1988 (69%).

While in the California Senate, Garamendi served as Majority Leader. He chaired the Joint Committee on Science and Technology, the Senate Health and Welfare Committee, and the Senate Revenue and Taxation Committee.

=== 1982 gubernatorial election ===
Garamendi first ran for governor of California in 1982. In the Democratic primary, Los Angeles Mayor Tom Bradley defeated him, 61% to 25%.

=== 1986 controller election ===
In the 1986 Democratic primary for California State Controller, Garamendi lost to Assemblyman Gray Davis, 50% to 38%.

== Insurance commissioner (1991–1995) ==
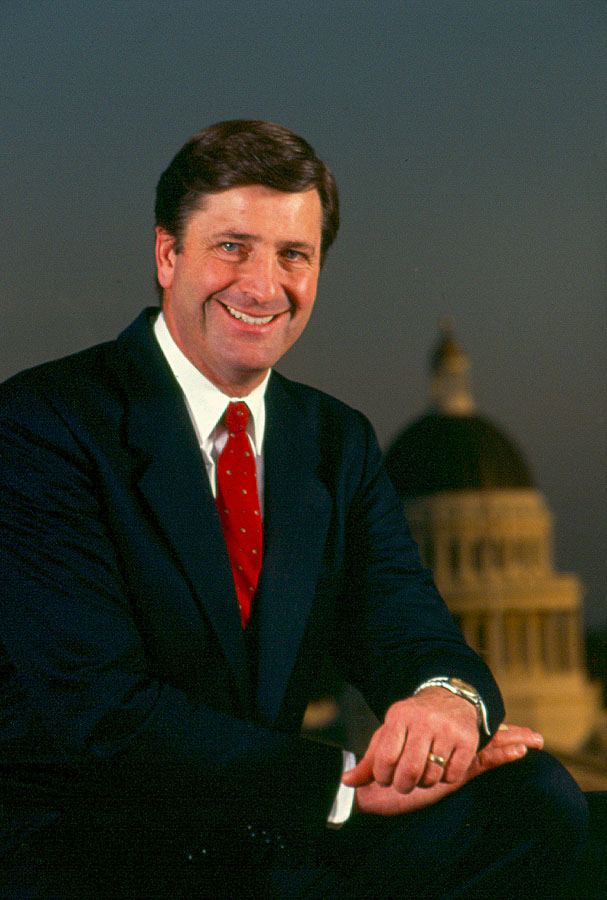
Garamendi as California Insurance Commissioner

=== 1990 election ===
Garamendi first ran for California Insurance Commissioner in 1990. He won the Democratic primary with a plurality of 36% of the vote. His closest challenger was radio talk show host Bill Press, who got 28% of the vote. In the general election, he defeated Republican Wes Bannister, 52% to 38%. In fact, he was so confident of winning that he resigned his state senate seat early to give an advantage to his wife Patti, over her top rival for the seat, assemblyman Patrick Johnston (D-Stockton) for the upcoming special election to replace him.

=== Tenure ===
In 1991, while serving as California Insurance Commissioner, Garamendi seized Executive Life, a failing life insurance company, and resold it to French investors who turned out to be fronts for a government-owned French bank. They made billions of dollars selling off the company's portfolio of junk bonds while the Californians with Executive Life policies were very negatively affected. This became a scandal in both the U.S. and France, with the U.S. government filing criminal charges, because it was illegal for a government-owned bank to own a U.S. insurer. Policyholders blamed Garamendi for putting them in this position.

Eventually the U.S. government reached a settlement with the French bankers, and in 2005 Garamendi agreed to a settlement, the terms of which further angered Executive Life policyholders, who, according to the Sacramento Bee, "had been damaged to the tune of perhaps $5 billion." A leader of the policyholders' interest group, Sue Watson, said, "We are shocked and outraged that the largest financial fraud in California history would be settled for so little and without even a fight." The Bee editorialized that "Garamendi cannot simultaneously assert that the sale was a good deal and a multibillion-dollar fraud, and then defend a cents-on-the-dollar settlement that left the buyers with billions of dollars in windfall profits. It just does not make sense."

=== 1994 gubernatorial election ===
Garamendi ran for California governor a second time in 1994. In the Democratic primary, State Treasurer Kathleen Brown defeated him, 48% to 33%.

== 1995–2003 ==
After Garamendi's tenure as insurance commissioner, President Bill Clinton appointed him Deputy Secretary of the Interior, the second-highest post in the U.S. Department of the Interior. He resigned in 1998 and became a partner at Yucaipa Companies, which had deals financed by Leon Black. Also from 1998 to 2000, Garamendi returned to the Peace Corps, leading groups of volunteers that helped negotiate peace treaties in the Eritrean–Ethiopian War and Second Congo War.

== Insurance commissioner (2003–2007) ==
=== 2002 election ===
Garamendi ran for California insurance commissioner for a second time in 2002. He won the Democratic primary with 39% of the vote. In the general election, he defeated Republican Gary Mendoza 46% to 42%.

=== 2003 gubernatorial recall election ===
On August 7, 2003, Garamendi announced his candidacy for governor a third time in the gubernatorial recall election, but dropped out two days later to endorse Lieutenant Governor Cruz Bustamante.

== Lieutenant governor (2007–2009) ==
=== 2006 election ===
On July 16, 2004, Garamendi announced his candidacy for lieutenant governor of California. He was endorsed by former Vice President Al Gore, the Sierra Club, the California Teachers Association, the California League of Conservation Voters, the Peace Officers Research Association of California, the California Professional Firefighters Association, former U.S. Senate Majority Leader Tom Daschle, and former U.S. Interior Secretary Bruce Babbitt. Garamendi won the Democratic primary by defeating state senators Jackie Speier and Liz Figueroa 43% to 40% to 18%. In the general election, he defeated Republican state senator Tom McClintock 49% to 45%.

== U.S. House of Representatives (2009–present) ==
=== Elections ===
==== 2009 special ====
Initially, Garamendi planned to run for governor in the 2010 election. However, Representative Ellen Tauscher resigned from her U.S. House seat for California's 10th congressional district to become Under Secretary of State for Arms Control and International Security. Garamendi announced his intention to run in the 2009 special election there despite living outside the district. There was some confusion about the location of Garamendi's residence. Garamendi said: "My front yard is in the district, our bedroom is not." He continued to fuel speculation about his residence when he said the same thing to The New York Times in July. Later reports confirmed that his home was outside district boundaries.

In the September election, no candidate reached the 50% threshold to avoid a runoff. Garamendi ranked first among Democrats with 26% of the vote, defeating State Senator Mark DeSaulnier (18%) and Assemblymember Joan Buchanan (12%). In the runoff on November 3, Garamendi defeated Republican nominee David Harmer, 53% to 43%. Garamendi was sworn in as a member of the House of Representatives on November 5, 2009.

==== 2010 ====
Garamendi was reelected to his first full term, defeating Republican nominee Gary Clift 59% to 38%.

==== 2012 ====
After redistricting, Garamendi filed papers in March 2012 to run in the newly redrawn 3rd district.

Garamendi was running in a district that was over 77% new to him. While the old 10th district traditionally favored Democrats, the new 3rd was somewhat more of a swing district. But the bulk of its vote was in Democratic-leaning territory between the Bay Area and Sacramento, Garamendi's base. Garamendi defeated Republican Kim Vann 54.2% to 45.8%.

==== 2014 ====
Garamendi was reelected, 53% to 47%, over Republican Assemblyman Dan Logue of Yuba County.

=== Political positions ===
==== Abortion ====
Garamendi supports abortion access for everyone. He called Roe v. Wade a "fundamental human right to bodily autonomy". He opposed the 2022 overturning of Roe v. Wade, calling the decision "devastating".

==== Donald Trump ====
Garamendi was critical of President Donald Trump, suggesting in December 2016 that because of his international real-estate business, Trump was weighed down by conflicts of interest. He also said he was disturbed by the placement of "generals, ex-generals in every one of the key positions dealing with the military, dealing with international affairs."

At a July 2017 town hall in Davis, Garamendi said that developments in the Trump administration were "far more serious" than Watergate.

In July 2017, Garamendi said that during recent visits to Vietnam, South Korea, and Australia, he had encountered "angst, worry and concern about what's happening in America."

Garamendi said in January 2018 that he was "angry" when Trump referred to certain Third World nations as "shithole countries".

==== Environment ====
On February 24, 2019, Garamendi announced on Facebook that he had become a co-sponsor of H.Res.109, also known as the Green New Deal. This decision came after pressure from community members. The post read, "I welcome the energy and commitment of the supporters of H.Res.109, and I join with them as I continue my decades-long effort to stop Climate Change and save our planet."

In late 2022, Garamendi introduced a bill to strengthen the Jones Act when dismantling offshore oil & gas platforms and installing offshore wind farms. Industry commentators noted the risk of delaying such projects and/or increasing their costs due to lack of US vessels and personnel.

==== Health care ====
On December 9, 2021, Garamendi became a cosponsor of H.R.1976, the Medicare for All Act of 2021.

==== Joe Biden ====
Garamendi voted with President Joe Biden's stated position 100% of the time in the 117th Congress, according to a FiveThirtyEight analysis.

==== Economic policy ====
In January 2018, Garamendi called the Tax Cuts and Jobs Act of 2017 a "tax scam" that would primarily benefit the so-called "1 percent". He asserted that House "deficit hawks" wanted to "cut out the social safety net" to pay for the bill.

In a January 2018 interview, Garamendi said of the U.S. treasury: "There's no money. They gave it all away." He complained that current economic policies, including the large 2017 tax cuts, benefited the rich and corporations, not the middle class.

==== Immigration ====
In January 2018, Garamendi expressed the desire to "make sure every person is identified" and charged that E-Verify, a system intended to curtail undocumented employment, had "not really been enforced". He said that it was possible to compromise on the issue between conservative and progressive House members, and expressed concern about the fate of "undocumented immigrants who are not considered Dreamers."

==== Military ====
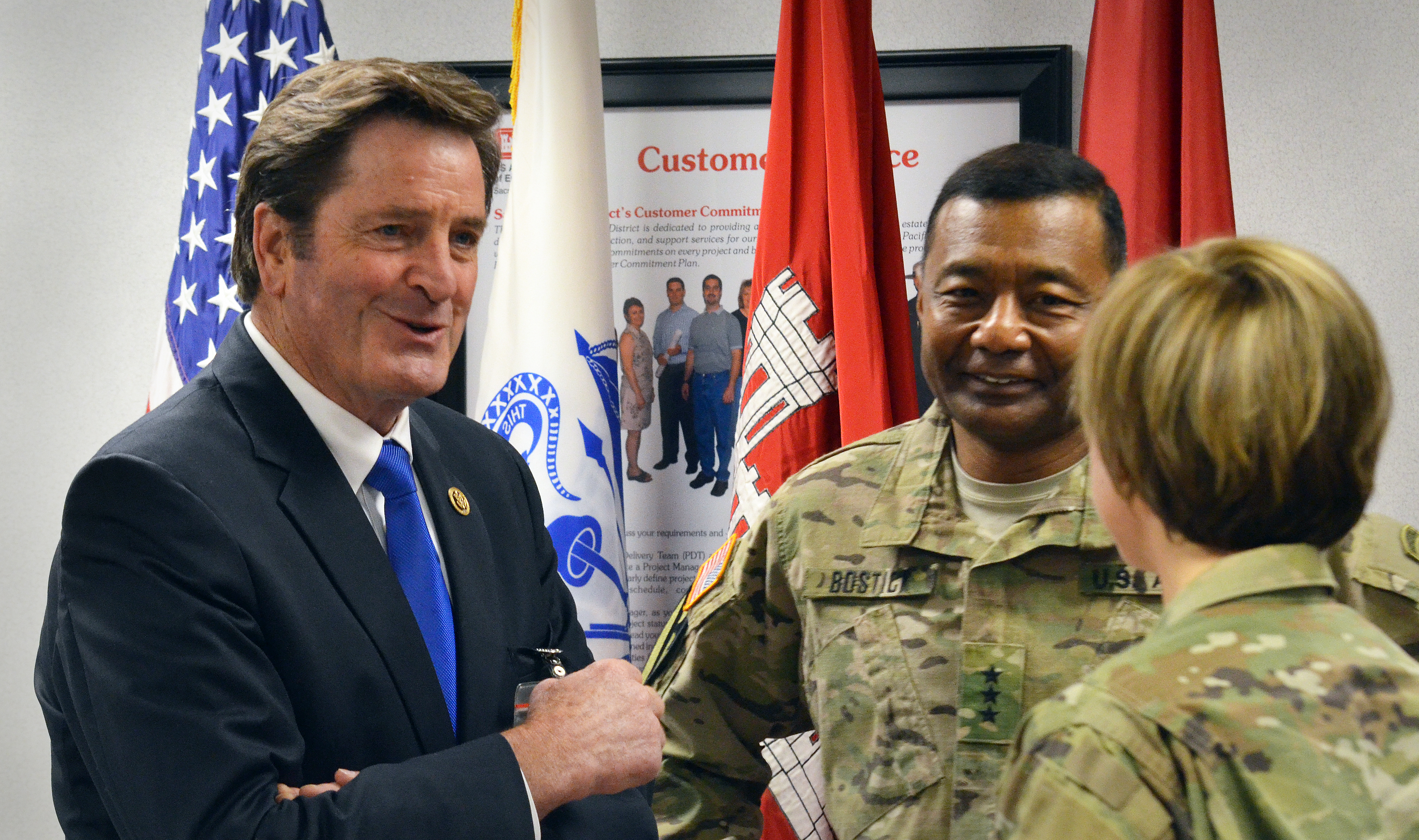
Garamendi speaks with generals during the District Commanders Course, 2015.

In May 2011, by a vote of 60–1, the House Armed Services Committee approved a $553 billion military funding bill that would increase pay and fund new aircraft, ships, and submarines. Garamendi cast the sole "no" vote. The same month, he introduced an amendment to the National Defense Authorization Act that would withdraw 90% of troops from Afghanistan by the end of 2013. Along with eight other members of Congress, he wrote a letter to President Obama asking him to end the war.

With Dianne Feinstein and Martin Heinrich, Garamendi sponsored the Due Process Guarantee Act, a 2012 bill that would bar the military from indefinitely detaining U.S. citizens or residents within the country without charge or trial.

Garamendi actively opposed a GOP-backed construction of a missile defense site on the East Coast, saying it was fiscally irresponsible to be "spending up to $5 billion in the next three years on a missile defense system that doesn't work."

He voted against extending the Patriot Act.

==== National security ====
In a May 2011 article, Garamendi wrote, "our national security is much more dependent on ending desperate poverty, funding good schools, and empowering women in the developing world while eradicating international terrorist networks like al Qaeda. With bin Laden dead and al Qaeda in Afghanistan largely extinguished, it's time we revisited the wisdom of continuing the war in Afghanistan."

In April 2018, he expressed opposition to building a border wall and said, "If you want to go where the problem is, fund the Coast Guard."

==== Student loans ====
In the fall of 2017, Garamendi and Brian Fitzpatrick co-introduced H.R. 4001, the Student Loan Refinancing and Recalculating Act. "For many Americans, the price of a college education is too high," he said.

==== Syria ====
On November 19, 2015, Garamendi voted for HR 4038, legislation that would effectively halt the resettlement of refugees from Syria and Iraq to the United States.

On March 31, 2018, he described Trump's approach to Syria as "helter-skelter" and "chaos".

==== Water supply ====
In a June 2017 article, Garamendi rejected the proposal known as California WaterFix, calling it an "expensive boondoggle", and instead expressed support for Proposition 1.

=== Committee assignments ===
For the 119th Congress:

- Committee on Armed Services
  - Subcommittee on Readiness (Ranking Member)
  - Subcommittee on Strategic Forces
- Committee on Transportation and Infrastructure
  - Subcommittee on Coast Guard and Maritime Transportation
  - Subcommittee on Economic Development, Public Buildings and Emergency Management
  - Subcommittee on Highways and Transit
  - Subcommittee on Water Resources and Environment

=== Caucus memberships ===
- House Democratic Caucus
- Congressional Progressive Caucus
- American Sikh Congressional Caucus (co-chair)
- Air Force Caucus
- Alzheimer's Task Force
- Blue Collar Caucus
- Congressional Asian Pacific American Caucus
- Congressional Equality Caucus
- Congressional Steel Caucus
- Congressional Ukraine Caucus
- Labor Caucus (co-chair)
- Military Families Caucus
- Peace Corps Caucus (co-chair)
- Rare Disease Caucus
- Shipbuilding Caucus
- Sustainable Energy and Environment Coalition
- United States Congressional International Conservation Caucus
- Veterinary Medicine Caucus
- Wine Caucus

== Personal life ==
Garamendi is married to Patricia Wilkinson who has worked as agriculture specialist for the California Exposition and State Fair and as deputy secretary of California's Business, Transportation and Housing Agency. President Clinton appointed her to serve as associate director of the Peace Corps in 1993 and as deputy administrator in the Department of Agriculture, Foreign Agricultural Service in 1998. Garamendi and Wilkinson live in Walnut Grove and have six children and 13 grandchildren.

In July 2024, Garamendi announced that he had been diagnosed with multiple myeloma.

== Electoral history ==
Electoral history of John Garamendi
Year	Office		Party	Primary			General			Result	Swing	Ref.
Year	Office		Party	Total	%	P.	Total	%	P.	Result	Swing	Ref.
1974	California State Assembly	7th	Democratic				60,380	64.08	1st	Won	Gain	
1976	State Senate	13th	Democratic				103,953	52.81	1st	Won	Hold	
1980	State Senate	13th	Democratic				160,490	65.77	1st	Won	Hold	
1982	Governor		Democratic	712,161	25.19	2nd				Lost	Gain	
1984	State Senate	5th	Democratic				176,910	69.11	1st	Won	Gain	
1986	State Controller		Democratic	821,415	37.79	2nd				Lost	Hold	
1988	State Senate	5th	Democratic				184,171	69.11	1st	Won	Hold	
1990	Insurance Commissioner		Democratic	849,678	35.52	1st	3,770,717	52.22	1st	Won	Win	
1994	Governor		Democratic	755,876	32.93	2nd				Lost	Hold	
2002	Insurance Commissioner		Democratic	800,146	38.55	1st	3,346,937	46.48	1st	Won	Hold	
2006	Lieutenant Governor		Democratic	1,045,130	42.53	1st	4,189,584	49.12	1st	Won	Hold	
2009	U.S. House	10th	Democratic	27,580	25.7	1st	72,817	52.85	1st	Won	Hold	
2010	U.S. House	10th	Democratic	62,138	100	1st	137,578	58.84	1st	Won	Hold	
2012	U.S. House	3rd	Democratic	59,546	51.3	1st	126,882	54.23	1st	Won	Gain	
2014	U.S. House	3rd	Democratic	54,672	53.48	1st	79,224	52.72	1st	Won	Hold	
2016	U.S. House	3rd	Democratic	98,430	63.11	1st	152,513	59.35	1st	Won	Hold	
2018	U.S. House	3rd	Democratic	74,552	53.59	1st	134,875	58.07	1st	Won	Hold	
2020	U.S. House	3rd	Democratic	110,504	59.2	1st	176,043	54.67	1st	Won	Hold	
2022	U.S. House	8th	Democratic	72,333	63.09	1st	145,501	75.73	1st	Won	Hold	
2024	U.S. House	8th	Democratic	100,193	76.99	1st	201,962	73.97	1st	Won	Hold	
2026	U.S. House	8th	Democratic	97,155	54.41	1st	TBD					
Source: Secretary of State of California | Statewide Election Results

== See also ==
- List of Hispanic and Latino Americans in the United States Congress

Political offices
New office	Insurance Commissioner of California; 1991–1995	Succeeded by Chuck Quackenbush
New office	United States Deputy Secretary of the Interior; 1995–1998	Succeeded by David Hayes
Preceded by Harry Low	Insurance Commissioner of California; 2003–2007	Succeeded by Steve Poizner
Preceded by Cruz Bustamante	Lieutenant Governor of California; 2007–2009	Succeeded by Mona Pasquil; Acting
U.S. House of Representatives
Preceded by Ellen Tauscher	Member of the U.S. House of Representatives from California's 10th congressional district 2009–2013	Succeeded by Jeff Denham
Preceded by Dan Lungren	Member of the U.S. House of Representatives from California's 3rd congressional district 2013–2023	Succeeded by Kevin Kiley
Preceded by Jay Obernolte	Member of the U.S. House of Representatives from California's 8th congressional district 2023–present	Incumbent
U.S. order of precedence (ceremonial)
Preceded by Judy Chu	United States representatives by seniority 74th	Succeeded by Tim Walberg
