= EdVoice =

American education non-profit organization

- Founders: Ted Lempert
- Website: edvoice.org

EdVoice is an American educational non-profit organization that advocates for education policy in California that will improve opportunities for children from low-income communities. The group describes its mission as reshaping public education in California so that children from low-income communities have a better chance at a happy life.

According to its web site, the EdVoice network connects over 50,000 teachers, parents, and community leaders with their state elected officials on important educational issues.

== Notable people ==
- Ted Lempert - founding CEO, former California State Assemblyman and founding director
- Christopher Cabaldon - former CEO, former West Sacramento mayor, current California State Senate
- Reed Hastings - EdVoice co-founder; founder/CEO of Netflix and former president of the California State Board of Education
- Steve Poizner - EdVoice co-founder; former California State Insurance Commissioner
- Laurene Powell Jobs - Former EdVoice board member; founder of College Track
- Bill Lucia - Former CEO
