= Robert W. Naylor =

American politician (born 1944)

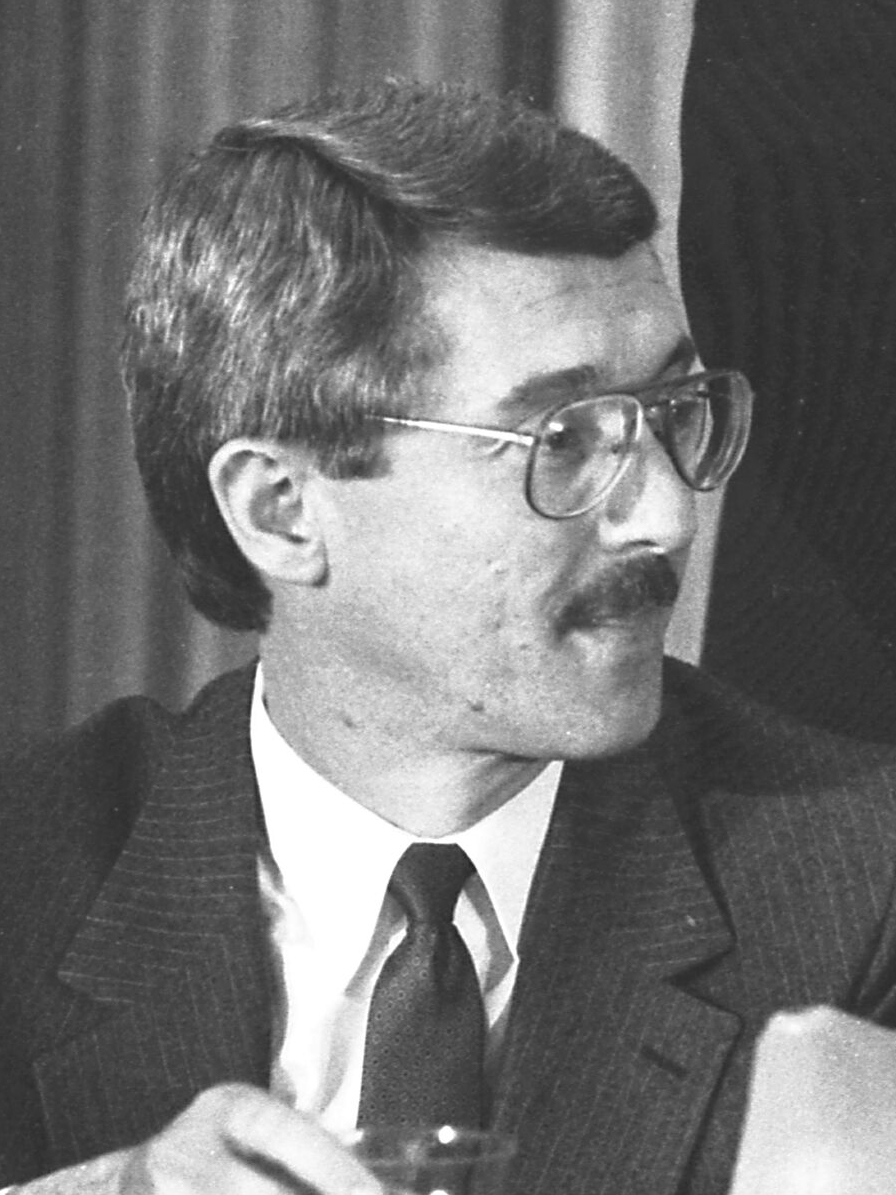
- Naylor in 1986

Minority Leader of the California Assembly
- In office January 11, 1982 – November 8, 1984
- Preceded by: Carol Hallett
- Succeeded by: Pat Nolan

Member of the California State Assembly from the 20th district
- In office December 8, 1978 – November 30, 1986
- Preceded by: Dixon Arnett
- Succeeded by: Bill Duplissea

Personal details
- Born: Robert Wesley Naylor; January 21, 1944 (age 82) Reno, Nevada, U.S.
- Party: Republican
- Spouse(s): Kay Naylor (divorced); Linda Kasem
- Children: Daisy Thoreson; Kristen Naylor Calderon
- Education: Stanford University (BA); Yale University (LLB)
- Website: Official website

Military service
- Allegiance: United States
- Branch/service: United States Army
- Years of service: 1975
- Rank: Lieutenant
- Battles/wars: Vietnam War

Robert Wesley Naylor (born January 21, 1944) is an American lawyer and politician. He is a former California State Assemblyman who represented the San Francisco Bay Area's 20th Assembly District from 1978 to 1986. During his tenure in the State Assembly, he served as Assembly Republican Leader from 1982 to 1984. After his tenure in the State Assembly, he served as Chair of the California Republican Party from 1987 to 1989.

== Early life and career ==
Naylor was born on January 21, 1944, in Reno, Nevada. Naylor earned his A.B. from Stanford University in 1966. While at Stanford, he was editor of The Stanford Daily and earned Phi Beta Kappa honors. Naylor earned his LL.B. from Yale Law School in 1969 and was admitted to the California bar in January 1970. Naylor was a United States Army Lieutenant and served in the Vietnam War, where he was co-director of the Vietnam Orphans Airlift in 1975. Upon returning from Vietnam, Naylor became an attorney, working on political and tax law.

== Political career ==
In 1978, Naylor was elected to represent southern San Mateo County as the Assemblyman for the 20th District. Re-elected to a second term in 1980, he was elected Assembly Republican Leader in 1982. During his tenure as Assembly Republican Leader, Naylor helped craft legislation tying increases in funding for public education with education reform measures. Re-elected to the Assembly in 1982 and 1984, Naylor did not seek a fifth term in the Assembly, instead choosing to seek the Republican nomination for the United States Senate, but won only 3.1% of the vote.

Shortly after leaving the Assembly at the end of his term in 1986, Naylor was elected Chairman of the California Republican Party, serving from 1987 to 1989. As party chair, he presided over Republican efforts to win California in the 1988 presidential election, which proved to be the last time Republicans have carried the state in a presidential election. Naylor has represented California as a delegate to ten Republican National Conventions, including in 1972, 1976, and 1980 (he was an alternate delegate in 2008).

In 1991, President George H. W. Bush appointed Naylor to the Board of Trustees of the James Madison Memorial Fellowship Foundation, where Naylor served from 1991 to 1995. He was also Chairman of the Association for California Tort Reform and a founding member of the board of directors of Calnet Business Bank, headquartered in Sacramento. He also served as a director of the Civil Justice Association of California. He currently serves as Vice Chair of the Leland Stanford Mansion Foundation and as Co-Chair of Californians for an Effective Legislature.

He joined the law firm of Nielsen, Merksamer, Parrinello, Mueller & Naylor as a partner, specializing in government law. The firm was renamed Nielsen, Merksamer, Parrinello, Gross & Leoni when Naylor left the firm in 2011 to launch Robert W. Naylor Advocacy.

== Personal life ==
Naylor resides in the Encino area of Los Angeles with his wife, Linda Kasem. He has two daughters, Daisy and Kristen, from a prior marriage.

California Assembly
Preceded by Dixon Arnett	California State Assemblyman; 20th District; December 8, 1978 – November 30, 1986	Succeeded by Bill Duplissea
Preceded by Carol Hallett	Minority Leader of the California State Assembly; January 11, 1982 – November 8, 1984	Succeeded by Pat Nolan
Party political offices
Preceded by Mike Antonovich	Chair of the California Republican Party; 1987–1989	Succeeded by Frank Visco
