= Bill Duplissea (politician) =

American politician (1950–2020)

Member of the California State Assembly from the 20th district
- In office December 1, 1986 - November 30, 1988
- Preceded by: Robert W. Naylor
- Succeeded by: Ted Lempert

Personal details
- Born: April 30, 1950 San Francisco, California
- Died: July 1, 2020 (aged 70) San Carlos, California
- Party: Republican
- Spouse: Sharon (m. 1971)
- Children: 2
- Education: Menlo College; University of San Francisco

William Duplissea (April 30, 1950 – July 1, 2020) was a Republican Assembly member from California's 20th State Assembly district, who served from 1986 until he was defeated for reelection in 1988 by Democrat Ted Lempert. He represented San Mateo County which is located in the Peninsula subregion of the San Francisco Bay Area.

== Political Service ==
Duplissea served as a member of the Metropolitan Transportation Commission, which serves the nine Bay Area Counties. He served as the Administrative Director of the Division of Workers' Compensation, Director of the Office of Manufacturing Retention, Public Member of the OSHA Appeals Board serving the administrations of George Deukmejian and Pete Wilson.

== Assembly career ==
Duplissea was elected by the Republican Caucus to the Leadership position of Caucus Secretary. Appointed by the Speaker of the California Assembly, Vice Chairman of the Assembly Committee on Transportation. He served on 4 committees during his time in the Assembly which were Labor & Employment, Revenue & Taxation, Ways & Means, and Jobs, Economic Development, and the Economy.

== Business career ==
- Vice President California Truck Trailer Services Inc. 1980–2020
- President Bayview Trailer and Equipment Inc. 1980–1984
- General Partner Carlos Cleaners and Launderers 1980–2020

== Education ==
- BA in History from the University of San Francisco in 1972.
- AA from Menlo College in 1970

== Personal life ==
Duplissea was born in San Francisco, California. He lived in San Carlos, California. Duplissea died in Redwood City, California.
