= Oscar C. Parkinson =

American politician

Oscar Charles Parkinson
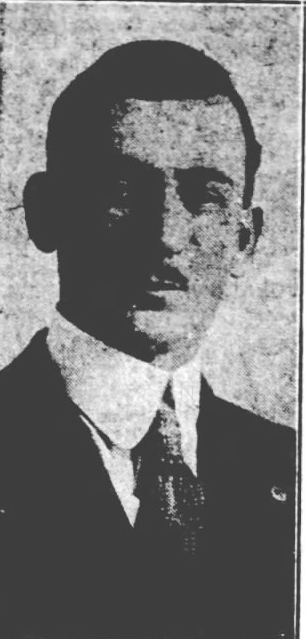
- Parkinson, circa 1920

Member of the California State Assembly from the 20th district
- In office January 3, 1921 – January 8, 1923
- Preceded by: Charles Lamb
- Succeeded by: George A. Dean

Personal details
- Born: November 29, 1891 Colusa, California
- Died: June 28, 1972 (aged 80) Desert Hot Springs, California
- Party: Republican
- Spouse: Florence May Dolcater (m.1923)

Military service
- Branch/service: United States Army
- Battles/wars: World War I

Oscar Charles Parkinson (November 29, 1891 – June 28, 1972) was an American lawyer and politician. He was elected to the California State Assembly in 1920, representing the 20th district from 1921 to 1923. During World War I, he served in the United States Army.

Parkinson died on June 28, 1972 after a long illness.
