= 1988 California State Senate election =

- November 8, 1988

20 seats from odd-numbered districts in the California State Senate 21 seats needed for a majority
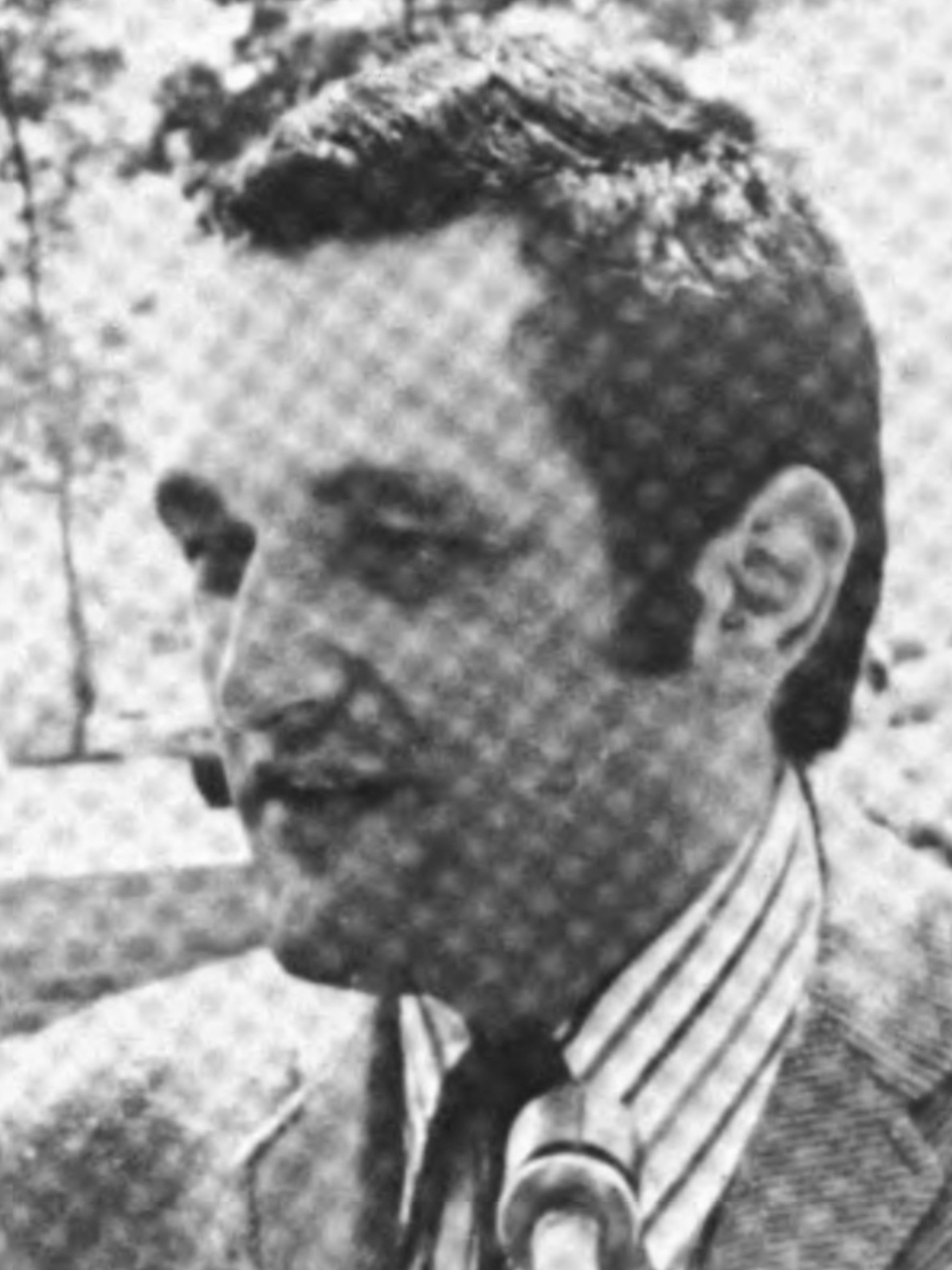

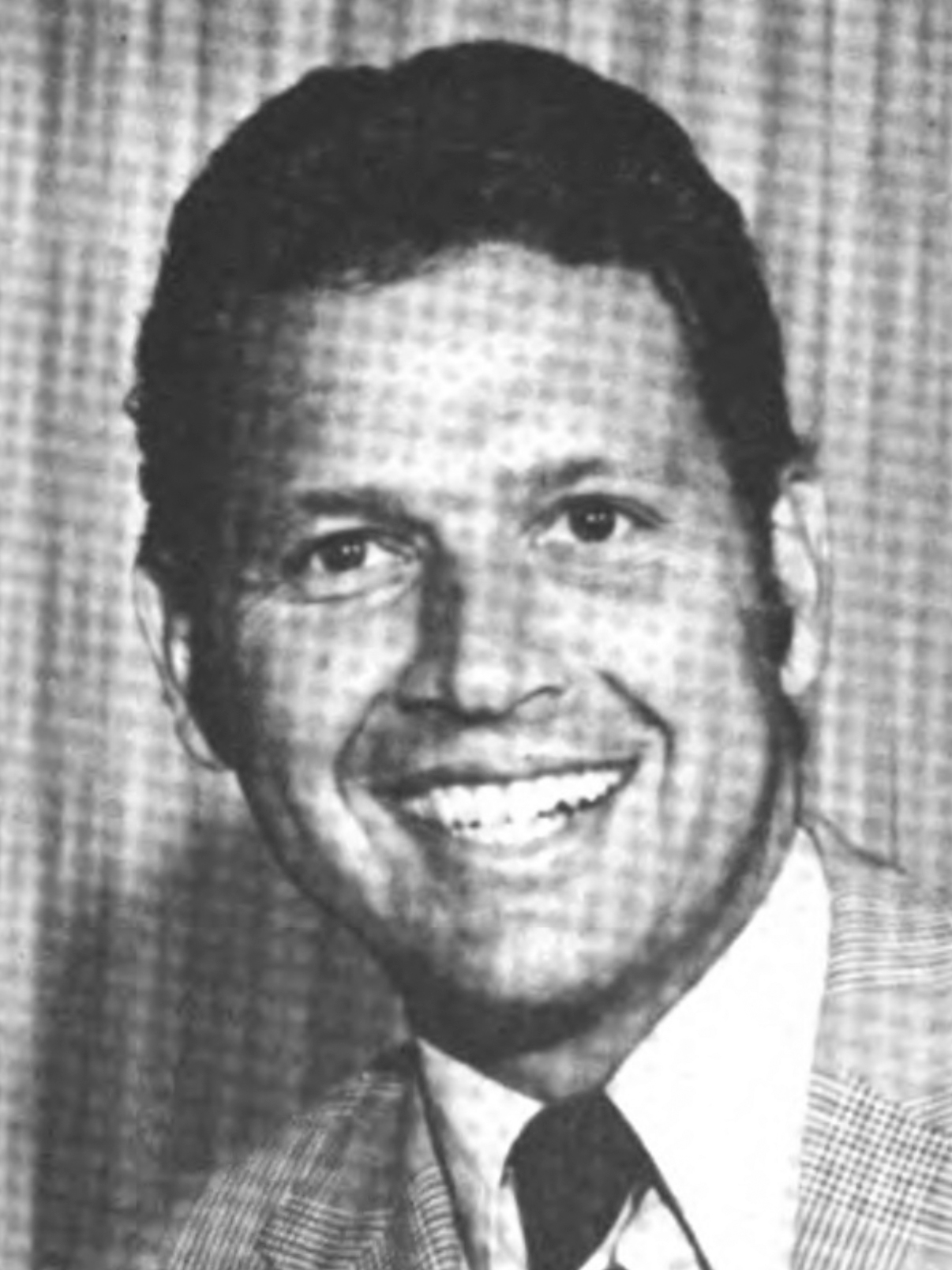
	Majority party	Minority party
Leader	David Roberti	Kenneth L. Maddy
Party	Democratic	Republican
Leader's seat	23rd–Los Angeles	14th–Fresno
Seats before	25	14
Seats after	25	14
Seat change	Steady	Steady
Popular vote	1,079,543	719,817
Percentage	58.13%	39.24%
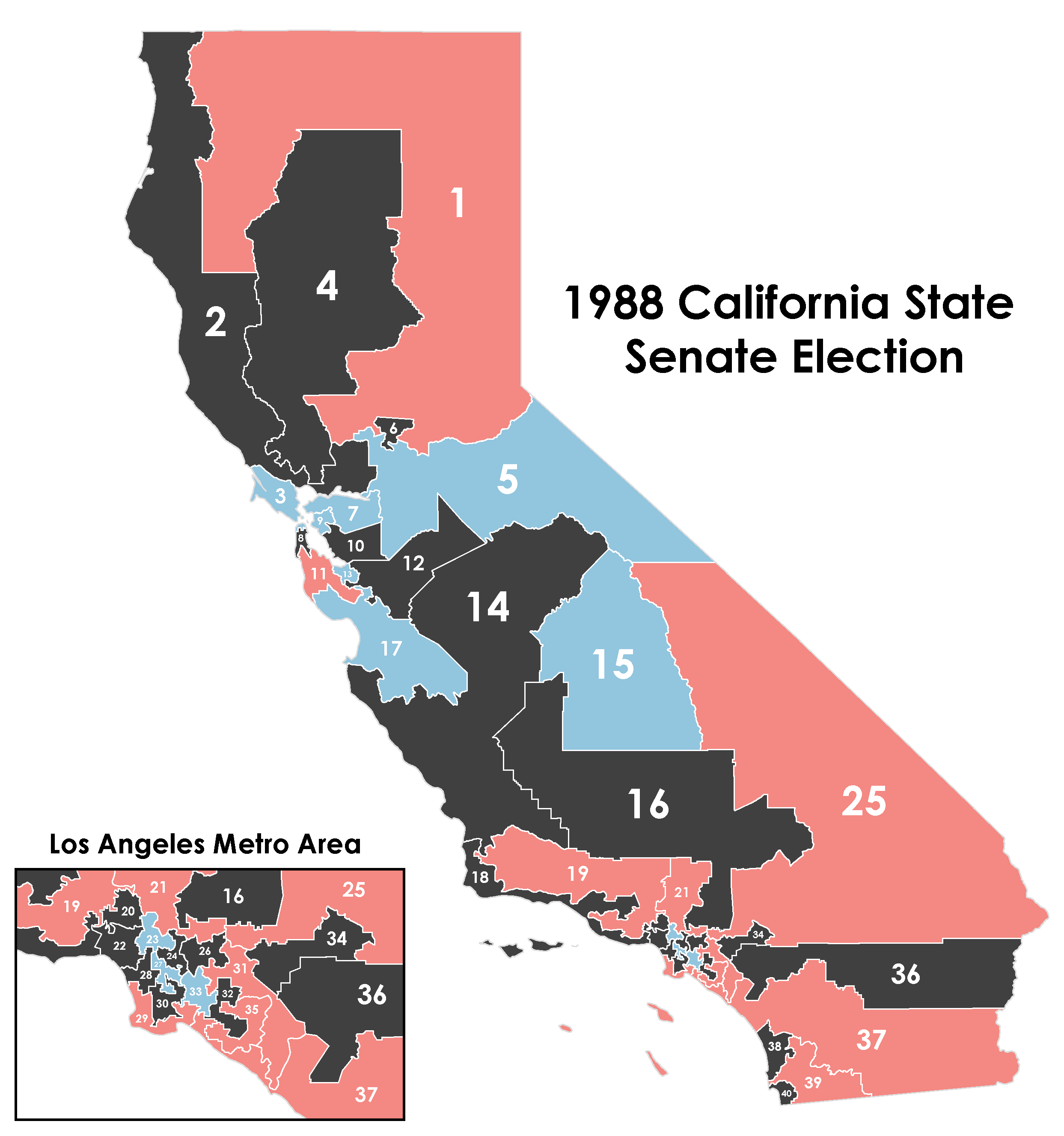
- Results: Democratic hold Republican hold No election held
President pro tempore before election
David Roberti
Democratic
President pro tempore-designate
David Roberti
Democratic

The 1988 California State Senate elections were held on November 8 in the twenty odd-numbered Senate districts. There was no change to the representation of the Democratic and Republican parties.

== Overview ==
California State Senate elections, 1988
Party	Votes	Percentage	Not up	Incumbents	Open	Before	After	+/–
Democratic	1,079,543	58.85%	0	5	0	5	5	0
Republican	719,817	39.24%	0	2	0	2	2	0
Independent	0	0.00%	0	0	0	0	0	0
Libertarian	20,445	1.11%	0	0	0	0	0	0
Peace and Freedom	14,611	0.80%	0	0	0	0	0	0
Totals	1,834,416	100.00%	0	7	0	7	7	—

== District 1 ==
California's 1st State Senate district election, 1988
Party	Candidate	Votes	%
Republican	John Doolittle (incumbent)	164,115	54.30
Democratic	Roy D. Whiteaker	138,129	45.70
Total votes		302,244	100.00
Republican hold			

== District 3 ==
California's 3rd State Senate district election, 1988
Party	Candidate	Votes	%
Democratic	Milton Marks (incumbent)	164,608	65.79
Republican	Carol M. Marshall	76,798	30.69
Peace and Freedom	Ron Rodriguez	4,774	1.91
Libertarian	Mark Read Pickens	4,026	1.61
Total votes		250,206	100.00
Democratic hold			

== District 5 ==
California's 5th State Senate district election, 1988
Party	Candidate	Votes	%
Democratic	John Garamendi (incumbent)	184,171	69.11
Republican	Sam L. Lawrence	82,310	30.89
Total votes		266,481	100.00
Democratic hold			

== District 7 ==
California's 7th State Senate district election, 1988
Party	Candidate	Votes	%
Democratic	Daniel E. Boatwright (incumbent)	172,875	62.40
Republican	William J. Pollacek	104,148	37.60
Total votes		277,023	100.00
Democratic hold			

== District 9 ==
California's 9th State Senate district election, 1988
Party	Candidate	Votes	%
Democratic	Nicholas C. Petris (incumbent)	186,427	74.38
Republican	Greg Henson	54,373	21.69
Peace and Freedom	Robert J. Evans	9,837	3.93
Total votes		250,637	100.00
Democratic hold			

== District 11 ==
California's 11th State Senate district election, 1988
Party	Candidate	Votes	%
Republican	Becky Morgan (incumbent)	172,842	61.26
Democratic	Tom Nolan	100,639	35.67
Libertarian	Chuck Olson	8,645	3.07
Total votes		282,126	100.00
Republican hold			

== District 13 ==
California's 13th State Senate district election, 1988
Party	Candidate	Votes	%
Democratic	Al Alquist (incumbent)	132,694	64.51
Republican	Daniel C. Bertolet	65,231	31.71
Libertarian	John M. Inks	7,774	3.78
Total votes		205,699	100.00
Democratic hold			

== District 15 ==
California's 15th State Senate district election, 1988
Party	Candidate	Votes	%
Democratic	Rose Ann Vuich (incumbent)	176,467	100.00
Total votes		176,467	100.00
Democratic hold			

== District 17 ==
California's 17th State Senate district election, 1988
Party	Candidate	Votes	%
Democratic	Henry J. Mello (incumbent)	170,514	70.97
Republican	Harry J. Damkar	69,754	29.03
Total votes		240,268	100.00
Democratic hold			

== District 19 ==
California's 19th State Senate district election, 1988
Party	Candidate	Votes	%
Republican	Edward M. Davis (incumbent)	216,257	72.20
Democratic	Andrew Earl Martin	74,819	24.98
Libertarian	Aaron Starr	8,450	2.82
Total votes		299,526	100.00
Republican hold			

== District 21 ==
California's 21st State Senate district election, 1988
Party	Candidate	Votes	%
Republican	Newton R. Russell (incumbent)	188,573	68.58
Democratic	Louise C. Gelber	77,362	28.14
Libertarian	Robert H. Scott	5,236	1.90
Peace and Freedom	Michael W. Blumenthal	3,792	1.38
Total votes		274,963	100.00
Republican hold			

== District 23 ==
California's 23rd State Senate district election, 1988
Party	Candidate	Votes	%
Democratic	David Roberti (incumbent)	119,354	67.60
Republican	Tom Larkin	46,784	26.50
Peace and Freedom	Elizabeth A. Nakano	5,540	3.14
Libertarian	Sarah E. Foster	4,864	2.76
Total votes		176,542	100.00
Democratic hold			

== District 25 ==
California's 25th State Senate district election, 1988
Party	Candidate	Votes	%
Republican	Bill Leonard	190,717	66.10
Democratic	Sandra K. Hester	97,823	33.90
Total votes		288,540	100.00
Republican hold			

== District 27 ==
California's 27th State Senate district election, 1988
Party	Candidate	Votes	%
Democratic	Bill Greene (incumbent)	98,937	87.28
Republican	Johnnie G. Neely	10,989	9.69
Peace and Freedom	Jeffrey Mahlon	3,432	3.03
Total votes		113,358	100.00
Democratic hold			

== District 29 ==
California's 29th State Senate district election, 1988
Party	Candidate	Votes	%
Republican	Robert G. Beverly (incumbent)	178,131	67.38
Democratic	Jack Hachmeister	77,457	29.30
Libertarian	Steve Kelley	8,785	3.32
Total votes		264,373	100.00
Republican hold			

== District 31 ==
California's 31st State Senate district election, 1988
Party	Candidate	Votes	%
Republican	William P. Campbell (incumbent)	197,576	68.89
Democratic	Janice Lynn Graham	89,239	31.11
Total votes		286,815	100.00
Republican hold			

== District 33 ==
California's 33rd State Senate district election, 1988
Party	Candidate	Votes	%
Democratic	Cecil Green (incumbent)	104,606	50.84
Republican	Don Knabe	101,181	49.16
Total votes		205,767	100.00
Democratic hold			
