= Halim Dhanidina =

American judge from California

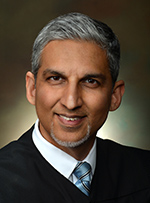

Justice of the California Court of Appeal, Second District
- In office 2018 – March 31, 2021
- Appointed by: Jerry Brown

Judge of the Los Angeles County Superior Court
- In office 2012–2018
- Appointed by: Jerry Brown

Personal details
- Born: Al-Halim Dhanidina; September 20, 1972 (age 53) Chicago, Illinois
- Education: Pomona College (BA); University of California, Los Angeles (JD)

Halim Dhanidina (born September 20, 1972) is an American lawyer and former judge from California. As of April 1, 2022, he is a partner at the criminal defense firm of Werksman Jackson & Quinn LLP in Los Angeles. He was a justice of the California Court of Appeal for the Second District. Appointed to the Los Angeles Superior Court bench by Governor Jerry Brown in 2012, he is the first Muslim to ever be appointed judge in California. He is an Ismaili Shiite of Gujarati Indian heritage, his parents immigrating from Tanzania.

== Career ==
Halim Dhanidina was born in Chicago, Illinois in 1972. He graduated from Evanston Township High School in 1990.

He was a Deputy District Attorney of Los Angeles County for fourteen years, prosecuting cases for the Hardcore Gang and Major Crimes Divisions. He is also a founding member of the Association of South Asian Prosecutors, and a member of the Asia Pacific American and South Asian Bar Association.

Prior to becoming a prosecutor, he obtained a Juris Doctor degree from UCLA School of Law, where he was the co-chair of the Asia Pacific Islander Law Students Association. Before that, he completed a B.A. in International Relations at Pomona College in 1994, where he founded the Muslim Students Association.

In 2012, Governor Brown appointed him to serve as a judge on the Los Angeles County Superior Court and in 2018 Brown appointed him to Division Three of the California Court of Appeal, Second Appellate District. The Commission on Judicial Appointments unanimously confirmed him on August 23, 2018.

He is a teacher and mentor and has worked as an adjunct professor at the Chapman University Fowler School of Law, Western State Law School, Whittier Law School and the Glendale University College of Law, where he has taught criminal trial advocacy, civil trial advocacy, criminal procedure, professional responsibility, and California criminal law. The former justice is also a law lecturer at The Universitry of California in Los Angeles Law School and is an adjunct professor at UCI Irvine.

In April 2016, while dismissing charges of lewd conduct and indecent exposure against a defendant in his court, Judge Dhanidina strongly criticized sting operations by the Long Beach Police Department directed at gay men seeking sex in public places, noting that the sting operations appeared to induce the conduct for which the defendants were then arrested, and that the police apparently did not conduct any similar sting operations directed at heterosexual conduct.

In April 2022, former Justice Dhanidina joined the California defense firm Werksman, Jackson & Quinn LLP. In 2026, he was named the Dean of Western State, College of Law.
