= Liz Figueroa =

American politician

Member of the California Senate from the 10th district
- In office December 7, 1998 – November 30, 2006
- Preceded by: Bill Lockyer
- Succeeded by: Ellen Corbett

Member of the California State Assembly from the 20th district
- In office December 5, 1994 – November 30, 1998
- Preceded by: Delaine Eastin
- Succeeded by: John A. Dutra

Personal details
- Born: Elizabeth Figueroa; February 9, 1951 (age 75) San Francisco, California, U.S.
- Party: Democratic
- Spouse: Robert Lewis Bloom (m. 1971)
- Children: 2
- Education: College of San Mateo; University of California at Berkeley

Liz Figueroa (born February 9, 1951) Is an American politician who served as a member of the California State Legislature from 1994 to 2006. She is known for being the first Latina from Northern California to be elected to the legislature.

== Early life and education ==
Figueroa was born and raised in San Francisco. She is a first generation American and college graduate. Her parents immigrated from El Salvador. She attended the College of San Mateo and University of California, Berkeley.

== Career ==
From 1994 to 1998, Figueroa served in the California State Assembly, representing the 20th District. In 1998, she was elected to the California State Senate, replacing Bill Lockyer. She served as a member of the California State Senate, representing the 10th district.

As a legislator, Figueroa worked on consumer and health-related issues. She authored legislation requiring insurance companies to cover replacement of children's car seats after collisions, and funding legislation for the San Francisco Bay Trail.

In 2002, Figueroa introduced California Shine the Light law, a bill addressing business practices when disclosing customer's personal information to third parties, a practice known as "list brokerage." In April 2004, Figueroa garnered national attention when she proposed a bill (S.B. 1822) aimed at limiting Google's Gmail service from providing ads to users based in part on the content of their emails. After a few months negotiating with privacy groups and Google, Figueroa abandoned the effort.

Figueroa ran for lieutenant governor of California in 2006. In the June 6, 2006, primary election, against fellow state senator Jackie Speier and Insurance Commissioner John Garamendi. Figueroa received 18% of the vote. Speier received 39%, while Garamendi won the primary with 42%.

After leaving office, Figueroa was appointed by California Senate President Don Perata in 2007 to the California Unemployment Insurance Appeals Board.

She worked for Planned Parenthood Mar Monte as vice president of public affairs and is now retired.
