= Wes Bannister =

American politician

Personal details
- Born: Wesley Mastin Bannister; October 11, 1936
- Died: December 10, 2009 (aged 73)
- Party: Republican
- Spouse: Elizabeth Ann Rogers (m. 1959)
- Education: United States Military Academy University of Houston

Military service
- Allegiance: United States of America
- Branch/service: United States Army
- Rank: Captain

Wesley Mastin Bannister (October 11, 1936 – December 10, 2009) was the 39th Mayor of Huntington Beach and served in the position from 1988 to 1989. Bannister was elected to the Huntington Beach City Council and served from 1986 to 1990.

Bannister was a candidate for California Insurance Commissioner in 1990.

Bannister was on the Board of Directors for the Orange County Water District from 1991 to 2009 and served as chairman to the 37 member board of the Metropolitan Water District (MWD).
