= 1998 California Insurance Commissioner election =

- November 3, 1998
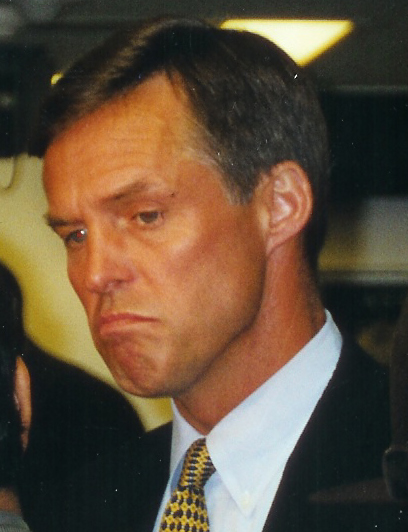

Nominee	Chuck Quackenbush	Diane Martinez
Party	Republican	Democratic
Popular vote	4,006,762	3,519,453
Percentage	49.86%	43.80%
- County results Quackenbush: 40–50% 50–60% 60–70% Martinez: 40–50% 50–60% 60–70% 70–80%
Ins. Comm. before election
Chuck Quackenbush
Republican
Elected Ins. Comm.
Chuck Quackenbush
Republican

The 1998 California Insurance Commissioner election occurred on November 3, 1998. The primary elections took place on June 3, 1998. The Republican incumbent, Chuck Quackenbush, narrowly defeated the Democratic nominee, State Assemblywoman Diane Martinez.

== Primary results ==
Final results from the Secretary of State of California

=== Democratic ===
California Insurance Commissioner Democratic primary, 1998
Candidate	Votes	%
Diane Martinez	1,343,736	57.42
Hal Brown	996,356	42.58
Total votes	2,340,092	100.00

=== Peace & Freedom ===
California Insurance Commissioner Peace & Freedom primary, 1998
Candidate	Votes	%
Gary R. Ramos	86,772	54.47
Tom Condit	72,535	45.53
Total votes	159,307	100.00

=== Others ===
California Insurance Commissioner primary, 1998 (Others)
Party	Candidate	Votes	%
Republican	Chuck Quackenbush	2,586,052	100.00
Libertarian	Dale F. Ogden	131,636	100.00
Natural Law	Barbara Bourdette	113,877	100.00
American Independent	Merton D. Short	72,959	100.00

== Election results ==
Final results from the Secretary of State of California.

California Insurance Commissioner election, 1998
Party	Candidate	Votes	%
Republican	Chuck Quackenbush (incumbent)	4,006,762	49.86
Democratic	Diane Martinez	3,519,453	43.80
Libertarian	Dale F. Ogden	169,922	2.11
Natural Law	Barbara Bourdette	130,834	1.63
Peace and Freedom	Gary R. Ramos	116,091	1.44
American Independent	Merton D. Short	92,975	1.16
Invalid or blank votes		585,101	6.79
Total votes		8,036,037	100.00
Turnout			41.23
Republican hold			

=== Results by county ===
County	Martinez	Votes	Quackenbush	Votes	Ogden	Votes	Others	Votes
San Francisco	71.85%	153,211	21.05%	44,880	2.22%	4,740	4.88%	10,409
Alameda	63.40%	227,332	29.33%	105,177	2.20%	7,890	5.06%	18,144
Marin	59.05%	56,041	34.40%	32,649	2.52%	2,392	4.02%	3,817
San Mateo	56.75%	110,191	36.50%	70,876	2.56%	4,976	4.19%	8,137
Santa Cruz	51.71%	42,297	39.02%	31,918	3.33%	2,726	5.93%	4,849
Sonoma	51.02%	77,915	39.93%	60,979	2.84%	4,334	6.22%	9,501
Contra Costa	50.58%	145,715	42.67%	122,939	2.39%	6,894	4.35%	12,553
Santa Clara	50.49%	199,576	42.24%	166,962	2.81%	11,103	4.47%	17,651
Los Angeles	50.41%	959,748	43.95%	836,834	1.73%	32,846	3.92%	74,548
Solano	49.76%	48,896	44.05%	43,285	1.95%	1,921	4.23%	4,162
Yolo	49.28%	24,287	45.23%	22,290	1.69%	835	3.79%	1,868
Mendocino	47.68%	12,856	40.19%	10,836	3.42%	923	8.71%	2,349
Imperial	47.47%	11,127	45.10%	10,571	1.32%	310	6.10%	1,430
Napa	47.09%	19,439	45.13%	18,629	2.50%	1,032	5.27%	2,178
Monterey	45.00%	39,954	48.40%	42,968	2.07%	1,840	4.53%	4,019
Lake	43.71%	8,021	49.12%	9,013	2.35%	431	4.82%	884
San Benito	42.51%	5,417	50.07%	6,381	2.55%	325	4.87%	621
Sacramento	41.24%	143,972	53.15%	185,563	1.87%	6,522	3.75%	13,071
Merced	41.00%	15,781	53.17%	20,465	1.47%	567	4.35%	1,674
San Joaquin	40.06%	48,525	54.59%	66,131	1.39%	1,684	3.96%	4,803
Santa Barbara	38.69%	45,750	54.93%	64,942	2.02%	2,387	4.36%	5,156
Fresno	38.59%	63,426	55.98%	92,017	1.68%	2,756	3.76%	6,178
Stanislaus	38.57%	37,818	56.61%	55,509	1.53%	1,505	3.28%	3,217
Alpine	38.53%	210	52.11%	284	2.75%	15	6.60%	36
Kings	38.42%	8,515	55.27%	12,251	1.45%	321	4.86%	1,078
Humboldt	38.33%	16,943	52.68%	23,285	2.94%	1,301	6.04%	2,672
Del Norte	37.17%	2,675	54.55%	3,926	2.31%	166	5.98%	430
San Luis Obispo	36.49%	30,354	56.36%	46,880	2.70%	2,244	4.45%	3,701
Siskiyou	36.05%	5,793	55.69%	8,948	3.34%	537	4.92%	790
San Bernardino	36.05%	116,477	58.12%	187,777	1.79%	5,773	4.04%	13,056
San Diego	35.84%	249,315	56.72%	394,593	2.96%	20,571	4.48%	31,165
Ventura	35.61%	71,997	58.32%	117,919	1.99%	4,025	4.08%	8,241
Trinity	34.74%	1,689	53.06%	2,580	4.15%	202	8.03%	391
Tuolumne	34.31%	6,729	60.17%	11,801	1.82%	357	3.70%	725
Riverside	34.02%	112,936	60.63%	201,283	1.49%	4,937	3.87%	12,857
Butte	33.53%	21,395	59.50%	37,963	2.31%	1,473	4.65%	2,969
Tulare	33.11%	23,533	61.78%	43,909	1.55%	1,101	3.56%	2,528
Mono	32.99%	1,105	59.16%	1,982	3.01%	101	4.83%	162
Yuba	32.17%	4,274	60.68%	8,061	2.32%	308	4.82%	641
Madera	32.15%	8,265	61.49%	15,805	2.03%	523	4.33%	1,112
Lassen	31.76%	2,560	59.19%	4,771	2.56%	206	6.50%	524
Plumas	31.50%	2,633	62.22%	5,201	2.27%	190	4.01%	335
Calaveras	31.11%	4,945	60.70%	9,647	4.03%	641	4.16%	661
Nevada	31.06%	11,697	62.89%	23,686	2.45%	923	3.59%	1,354
Amador	30.94%	4,036	64.06%	8,357	1.69%	221	3.31%	431
Tehama	30.93%	5,615	61.40%	11,145	2.49%	452	5.18%	940
Mariposa	30.26%	2,103	61.08%	4,245	2.69%	187	5.97%	415
El Dorado	29.67%	16,766	63.89%	36,099	2.29%	1,296	4.15%	2,343
Colusa	29.59%	1,409	65.94%	3,140	1.49%	71	2.98%	142
Kern	29.23%	40,674	65.56%	91,216	1.53%	2,125	3.68%	5,118
Placer	29.18%	25,251	64.84%	56,116	2.03%	1,761	3.94%	3,415
Shasta	29.04%	15,036	63.66%	32,960	2.58%	1,336	4.72%	2,444
Modoc	28.60%	971	61.09%	2,074	3.18%	108	7.13%	242
Orange	28.47%	196,232	65.58%	452,081	2.14%	14,733	3.82%	26,301
Sierra	28.34%	481	60.87%	1,033	4.83%	82	5.95%	101
Inyo	27.94%	1,847	65.64%	4,339	2.24%	148	4.18%	276
Sutter	26.96%	5,806	67.85%	14,610	1.70%	365	3.48%	751
Glenn	25.59%	1,891	67.41%	4,981	2.48%	183	4.51%	334

== See also ==
- California state elections, 1998
- California Insurance Commissioner
