= 1998 California elections =

- November 3, 1998
- Registered: 14,969,185
- Turnout: 57.59% (▼7.94 pp)

Elections were held in California on November 3, 1998. Primary elections were held on March 3. Up for election were all the seats of the California State Assembly, 20 seats of the California Senate, seven constitutional officers, all the seats of the California Board of Equalization, as well as votes on retention of two Supreme Court justices and various appeals court judges. Twelve ballot measures were also up for approval. Municipal offices were also included in the election.

== Constitutional Offices ==
=== Governor ===
Final results from Secretary of State.

1998 California gubernatorial election
Party	Candidate	Votes	%
Democratic	Gray Davis	4,860,702	58.0
Republican	Dan Lungren	3,218,030	38.4
Green	Dan Hamburg	104,179	1.2
Libertarian	Steve Kubby	73,845	0.9
Peace and Freedom	Gloria Estela LaRiva	59,218	0.7
American Independent	Nathan E. Johnson	37,964	0.5
Natural Law	Harold H. Bloomfield	31,237	0.4
No party	Write-ins	21	0.0
Invalid or blank votes		235,925	2.74
Total votes		8,621,121	100.0
Turnout			41.4
Democratic gain from Republican			

=== Lieutenant governor ===
Final results from the Secretary of State of California

1998 Lieutenant Governor of California election
Party	Candidate	Votes	%
Democratic	Cruz Bustamante	4,290,473	52.7
Republican	Tim Leslie	3,161,031	38.8
Green	Sara Amir	247,897	3.0
Libertarian	Thomas Tryon	167,523	2.1
Peace and Freedom	Jaime Luis Gomez	109,888	1.4
American Independent	George McCoy	92,349	1.1
Reform	James Mangia	74,180	0.9
Invalid or blank votes		477,780	5.54
Total votes		8,621,121	100.0
Turnout			41.4
Democratic hold			

=== Secretary of State ===
Final results from the Secretary of State of California.

1998 California Secretary of State election
Party	Candidate	Votes	%
Republican	Bill Jones (incumbent)	3,785,069	47.00
Democratic	Michela Alioto	3,695,344	45.89
Libertarian	Gail Lightfoot	216,853	2.69
Natural Law	Jane Ann Bialosky	103,631	1.29
American Independent	Carolyn Rae Short	100,265	1.25
Peace and Freedom	Israel Feuer	78,837	0.98
Reform	Valli Sharpe-Geisler	72,949	0.91
Invalid or blank votes		568,173	6.59
Total votes		8,621,121	100.00
Turnout			41.4
Republican hold			

=== Controller ===
Final results from the Secretary of State of California.

1998 California State Controller election
Party	Candidate	Votes	%
Democratic	Kathleen Connell (incumbent)	4,875,969	60.91
Republican	Ruben Barrales	2,653,153	33.14
Libertarian	Pamela Pescosolido	147,397	1.84
American Independent	Alfred "Al" L. Burgess	108,847	1.36
Reform	Denise L. Jackson	100,683	1.26
Peace and Freedom	C. T. Weber	68,738	0.86
Natural Law	Iris Adam	50,990	0.64
Invalid or blank votes		615,344	7.14
Total votes		8,621,121	100.00
Turnout			41.4
Democratic hold			

=== Treasurer ===
Final results from the Secretary of State of California.

1998 California State Treasurer election
Party	Candidate	Votes	%
Democratic	Phil Angelides	4,166,206	52.60
Republican	Curt Pringle	3,159,898	39.90
Libertarian	John Petersen	183,436	2.32
Natural Law	Carlos Aguirre	172,844	2.18
Peace and Freedom	Jan B. Tucker	146,226	1.85
American Independent	Edmon V. Kaiser	91,801	1.16
Invalid or blank votes		700,710	8.13
Total votes		8,621,121	100.00
Turnout			41.4
Democratic gain from Republican			

=== Attorney general ===
Final results from the Secretary of State of California.

1998 California Attorney General election
Party	Candidate	Votes	%
Democratic	Bill Lockyer	4,119,139	51.50
Republican	Dave Stirling	3,389,709	42.38
American Independent	Diane Beall Templin	194,077	2.43
Libertarian	Joseph S. Farina	149,430	1.87
Peace and Freedom	Robert J. Evans	145,379	1.82
Invalid or blank votes		623,387	7.23
Total votes		8,621,121	100.0
Turnout			41.4
Democratic gain from Republican			

=== Insurance Commissioner ===
Final results from the Secretary of State of California.

1998 California Insurance Commissioner election
Party	Candidate	Votes	%
Republican	Chuck Quackenbush (incumbent)	4,006,762	49.86
Democratic	Diane Martinez	3,519,453	43.80
Libertarian	Dale F. Ogden	169,922	2.11
Natural Law	Barbara Bourdette	130,834	1.63
Peace and Freedom	Gary R. Ramos	116,091	1.44
American Independent	Merton D. Short	92,975	1.16
Invalid or blank votes		585,084	6.79
Total votes		8,621,121	100.0
Turnout			41.4
Republican hold			

== Board of Equalization ==
Final results from the California Secretary of State:

=== Overview ===
California Board of Equalization elections, 1998
Party	Votes	Percentage	Seats	+/–
Democratic	3,974,343	55.79%	2	0
Republican	2,507,252	35.19%	2	0
Libertarian	509,288	7.15%	0	0
Peace and Freedom	75,012	1.05%	0	0
Green	58,480	0.82%	0	0
Invalid or blank votes	1,596,255	18.30%	—	—
Totals	8,720,630	100.00%	4	—

=== District 1 ===
1998 State Board of Equalization District 1 election
Party	Candidate	Votes	%
Democratic	Johan Klehs (incumbent)	1,440,370	78.42
Libertarian	Kennita Watson	396,346	21.58
Invalid or blank votes		665,707	26.60
Total votes		2,597,630	100.00
Turnout			
Democratic hold			

=== District 2 ===
1998 State Board of Equalization District 2 election
Party	Candidate	Votes	%
Republican	Dean Andal (incumbent)	1,041,933	55.20
Democratic	Tom Y. Santos	845,533	44.80
Invalid or blank votes		377,911	16.68
Total votes		2,265,377	100.00
Turnout			
Republican hold			

=== District 3 ===
1998 State Board of Equalization District 3 election
Party	Candidate	Votes	%
Republican	Claude Parrish	1,028,148	53.10
Democratic	Mary Christian-Heising	806,716	41.66
Libertarian	J. R. Graham	71,428	3.69
Peace and Freedom	Maxine Bell Quirk	29,908	1.54
Invalid or blank votes		357,795	15.60
Total votes		2,293,995	100.00
Turnout			
Republican hold			

=== District 4 ===
1998 State Board of Equalization District 4 election
Party	Candidate	Votes	%
Democratic	John Chiang	881,724	60.23
Republican	Joe H. Adams, Jr.	437,171	29.86
Green	Glenn Trujillo Bailey	58,480	3.99
Peace and Freedom	Shirley Rachel Isaacson	45,104	3.08
Libertarian	William R. Jennings	41,514	2.84
Invalid or blank votes		194,842	11.75
Total votes		1,658,835	100.00
Turnout			
Democratic hold			

== Judicial system ==
=== Supreme Court of California ===
Final results from the California Secretary of State:

Chief Justice Ronald George
Vote on retention	Votes	%
Yes	4,656,520	75.49%
No	1,511,953	24.51%
Invalid	2,452,648	28.45%
Total votes	8,621,121	100.0%
Majority	3,144,567	49.98%
Turnout		

Chief Justice Retention results by county Yes: 80–90%; 70–80%; 60–70%

Associate Justice Janice Rogers Brown, Seat 1
Vote on retention	Votes	%
Yes	4,376,553	75.91%
No	1,389,053	24.09%
Invalid	2,855,515	33.12%
Total votes	8,621,121	100.0%
Majority	987,500	51.82%
Turnout		

Supreme Court Seat 1 Retention results by county Yes: 70–80%; 60–70%

Associate Justice Ming Chin, Seat 2
Vote on retention	Votes	%
Yes	4,203,767	69.26%
No	1,865,420	30.74%
Invalid	2,551,934	29.60%
Total votes	8,621,121	100.0%
Majority	2,338,347	38.42%
Turnout		

Supreme Court Seat 2 Retention results by county Yes: 70–80%; 60–70%; 50–60%

Associate Justice Stanley Mosk, Seat 3
Vote on retention	Votes	%
Yes	4,158,457	70.51%
No	1,739,471	29.49%
Invalid	2,723,193	31.59%
Total votes	8,621,121	100.0%
Majority	2,418,986	45.2%
Turnout		

Supreme Court Seat 3 Retention results by county Yes: 70–80%; 60–70%

=== California Courts of Appeal ===
See 1998 California Courts of Appeal election.

== California State Legislature elections ==
=== State Senate ===
There are 40 seats in the State Senate. For this election, candidates running in even-numbered districts ran for four-year terms.

California State Senate - 1998	Seats
Democratic-Held	23
Republican-Held	16
Independent Held	1
1998 Elections
Democratic Held and Uncontested	8
Contested	20
Republican Held and Uncontested	11
Independent Held and Uncontested	1
Total	40

=== State Assembly ===
All 80 biennially elected seats of the State Assembly were up for election this year. Each seat has a two-year term. The Democrats retained control of the State Assembly.

California State Assembly - 1998	Seats
Democratic-Held	43
Republican-Held	37
1998 Elections
Democratic Incumbent and Uncontested	32
Republican Incumbent and Uncontested	23
Contested, Open Seats	25
Total	80

== Statewide ballot propositions ==
Twelve ballot propositions qualified to be listed on the general election ballot in California. Eight measures passed while four failed.

=== Proposition 1A ===
Proposition 1A would provide for a bond of $9.2 billion for funding for at least four years for class size reduction, to relieve overcrowding and accommodate student enrollment growth and to repair older schools and for wiring and cabling for education technology; and to upgrade and build new classrooms in California Community Colleges, California State University, and University of California systems. Proposition 1A passed with 62.5% approval.

Proposition 1A results by county Yes: 70–80%; 60–70%; 50–60%; No: 50–60%

=== Proposition 1 ===
Proposition 1 would amend Article XIII A of the Constitution, added by Proposition 13, to allow repair or replacement of environmentally-contaminated property or structures without increasing the tax valuation of original or replacement property. Proposition 1 passed with 71.1% of the vote.

Proposition 1 results by county Yes: 70–80%; 60–70%; 50–60%

=== Proposition 2 ===
Proposition 2 would impose repayment conditions on loans of transportation revenues to the General Fund and local entities; and designate local transportation funds as trust funds and require a transportation purpose for their use. Proposition 2 passed with 75.4% approval.

Proposition 2 results by county Yes: 80–90%; 70–80%; 60–70%; 50–60%

=== Proposition 3 ===
Proposition 3 would change existing open primary law to require closed, partisan primaries for purposes of selecting delegates to national presidential nominating conventions, limiting voting for such delegates to voters registered by political party. Proposition 3 failed with 46.1% approval.

Proposition 3 results by county No: 70–80%; 60–70%; 50–60%; Yes: 50–60%

=== Proposition 4 ===
Proposition 4 would prohibit trapping fur-bearing or non-game mammals with specified traps, such as poison and steel-jawed leghold traps, and would prohibit commerce in fur of such animals. Proposition 4 passed with 57.5% approval.

Proposition 4 results by county Yes: 70–80%; 60–70%; 50–60%; No: 70–80%; 60–70%; 50–60%

=== Proposition 5 ===
Proposition 5 would specify terms and conditions of mandatory compact between state and Indian tribes for gambling on tribal land. Proposition 5 passed with 62.4% approval.

Proposition 5 results by county Yes: 60–70%; 50–60%; No: 60–70%; 50–60%

=== Proposition 6 ===
Proposition 6 would make possession, transfer, or receipt of horses for slaughter for human consumption a felony, and would make the sale of horse meat for human consumption a misdemeanor. Proposition 6 passed with 59.4% approval.

Proposition 6 results by county Yes: 60–70%; 50–60%; No: 60–70%; 50–60%

=== Proposition 7 ===
Proposition 7 would authorize $218 million in state tax credits annually, until January 2011, to encourage air-emissions reductions through the acquisition, conversion, and retrofitting of vehicles and equipment. Proposition 7 failed with 43.6% approval.

Proposition 7 results by county No: 70–80%; 60–70%; 50–60%; Yes: 50–60%

=== Proposition 8 ===
Proposition 8 called for permanent class size reduction funding for districts establishing parent-teacher councils, testing for teacher credentialing, and pupil suspension for drug possession. Proposition 8 failed with 36.8% approval.

Proposition 8 results by county No: 70–80%; 60–70%; 50–60%

=== Proposition 9 ===
Proposition 9 would prohibit assessment of taxes, bonds, and surcharges to pay costs of nuclear power plants. Proposition 9 failed with 26.5% approval.

Proposition 9 results by county No: 80–90%; 70–80%; 60–70%; 50–60%

=== Proposition 10 ===
Proposition 10 would create state and county commissions to establish early childhood development and smoking prevention programs, and impose additional taxes on cigarettes and tobacco products. Proposition 10 passed with 50.5% approval.

Proposition 10 results by county Yes: 60–70%; 50–60%; No: 70–80%; 60–70%; 50–60%

=== Proposition 11 ===
Proposition 11 would authorize local governments to voluntarily enter into sales tax revenue sharing agreements by a two-thirds vote of the local city council or board of supervisors of each participating jurisdiction. Proposition 11 passed with 53.4% approval.

Proposition 11 results by county Yes: 60–70%; 50–60%; No: 60–70%; 50–60%

== See also ==
- California State Legislature
- California State Assembly
- California State Senate
- Districts in California
- Political party strength in U.S. states
- Political party strength in California
- Elections in California
