= California FAIR Plan =

State-run property insurance program in California

Residential and commercial policies in force by Fiscal Year (ends September) View source data.

The California FAIR Plan Association (wherein "FAIR" stands for "Fair Access to Insurance Requirements"), or California FAIR Plan is a fire insurance pool created by the state of California in 1968 for property owners who cannot find insurance in the state's price-regulated "admitted" (or "traditional") market. (Note: Multiple sources:) It is an insurer of last resort, for people who cannot find, do not want, or feel they cannot afford, insurance in the "non-admitted," or "surplus line," market. FAIR Plan policies provide basic fire, lightning, and smoke damage coverage, but do not include tree damage, water damage, theft, or liability coverage; residential policies are capped at $3 million. As a not-for-profit insurer of last resort, the FAIR Plan is required by law to insure a qualified property regardless of the property's exposure to brush or wildfire, serving as a temporary safety net for property owners until coverage becomes available in the "admitted" or "traditional" market.

Starting around 2020, in what has been described as California's home insurance "crisis," seven of the state's twelve largest insurers, including non-profit USAA, stopped renewing many policies, and stopped issuing new policies out of concern for their financial solvency because the state's insurance regulator was not allowing them to sufficiently raise rates to cover the increasing risks and rebuilding costs from the increasing frequency and severity of wildfires. The insurance companies ran computer models in 2017 which predicted that yearly costs would increase by 55%, followed by them paying claims to victims of the 2017 and 2018 wildfires equal to all the profits they had made over the previous 25 years (more than $12 billion). Insurers pulling back from the "admitted" or "traditional" market led many homeowners to move to the FAIR Plan: Since 2020, the number of properties covered by the plan increased from 124,000 in 2019 to 663,000 by March 2026. In June 2026, 94% of the Plan's loss exposure was from residential properties, 6% from commercial properties, with its total loss exposure at $768 billion, up from $50 billion in 2018. In an attempt to rectify this situation, by 2026 the state started allowing insurance companies to use predictions of future fire risk (previously they were only allowed to use local fire history) to set rates, to pass their cost of reinsurance on to customers (previously disallowed, though common in other states), and to expedite the approval process for rate increases, all of which are expected to incentivize companies to resume issuing policies, thereby reducing the participation in the FAIR Plan.

== History ==
The FAIR Plan was established in August 1968 by a statutory amendment to the California Insurance Code, and is regulated by the office of the California Insurance Commissioner. It was created in response to insurers ceasing to write policies for people in minority neighborhoods destroyed by the 1965 Watts riots.

== Funding and operations ==
The California FAIR Plan is not a state agency and is not supported by federal, state, or local funds. It is an involuntary syndicated fire insurance pool comprising all insurers licensed to write and engaged in writing basic property insurance in California. All licensed property/casualty insurers which write basic property insurance required by Insurance Code sections 10091(a) and 10095(a) are members of the California FAIR Plan. The California FAIR Plan issues policies on behalf of its member companies. Each member company participates in the profits, losses, and expenses of the California FAIR Plan in direct proportion to its market share of business written in the state.

=== Risk ===
As an insurer of last resort, the California FAIR Plan is required to provide basic fire coverage to California property owners who cannot find insurance in California's price-regulated "admitted," "traditional," or "voluntary" market. (Insurance is still available in the "non-admitted" or "surplus-line" markets, but it is generally more expensive, and California law prohibits insurance brokers from offering this insurance to clients unless the broker can prove that their client has been turned down by three insurers in the "admitted" market.) Because of this, the FAIR Plan covers a higher number, and concentration, of properties at high risk of wildfire damage. In 2020, the FAIR Plan covered 2.5 percent of the statewide market share, but 20.4 percent of the market share in ZIP codes at high risk from wildfires.

Recent research and reporting provides updated evidence about changes in the geographic distribution of the California FAIR plan, particularly areas with high wildfire risk. An analysis by Insurance for Good found that the number of FAIR Plan policies increased 19 times in ZIP codes classified as having the highest wildfire risk between 2009 and 2024, while policies in the lowest risk ZIP codes declined by 47.5%. Stanford University's Climate and Energy Policy Program reported that residential FAIR Plan exposure increased by at least $100 million between September 2024 and June 2025 in approximately 26% of California ZIP codes. Bloomberg News separately reported that nine ZIP codes accounted for approximately 7% of the FAIR Plan's liability exposure, or $44 billion, as of September 2025.

In July 2024, 95% of the Plan's $400 billion loss exposure was due to residential properties, only 5% was from commercial properties. By March 2026, the plan's exposure increased to $700 billion.

A March 2026 study from the Haas School of Business at UC Berkeley found that the plan's risk is “disproportionately tied to higher-income, high-asset communities.” Academics have suggested that the plan lower its risk by not covering second homes, and by reducing the $3 million cap (which in 2026 is four times the median home value).

=== Rates ===
The California Insurance Commissioner must approve any rate increases the FAIR plan proposes, but because the FAIR plan is exempt from Proposition 103, the public has no say in a rate review.

The FAIR Plan has tried to raise its rates in order to be sufficiently funded, and was allowed to increase rates by 20% in 2019, and 16% in 2021. In 2023, even though it needed a 70% increase to be acutarially sound, it requested a 49% increase but was only allowed a 16% increase.

In March 2024, FAIR Plan president Victoria Roach stated: "Our rates are never actuarially sound because all of our expenses are not included in that ratemaking."

In October 2025, it asked for a 36% average residential rate hike, which would be greater for homeowners in fire-prone neighborhoods, and include decreases for residential properties not at risk of wildfire. In 2026, a 29% rate increase was approved.

Research has identified differences between the geographic distribution of FAIR Plan financial exposure and the distribution of premiums paid by policyholders. A 2026 review by the Haas School of Business at UC Berkeley found that some middle and lower income communities experienced high premiums per policy even where aggregate FAIR Plan exposure was comparatively modest, and reported greater premium stress among middle income households in high risk areas. Resources for the Future similarly found that FAIR Plan premiums were higher in ZIP codes with greater wildfire risk and that FAIR Plan policies generally provided more limited coverage than standard homeowners insurance. Reuters separately reported, citing data from the Climate and Community Institute, that the average residential FAIR Plan premium increased by approximately 400 percent between 2019 and 2023.

=== Assessments ===
If the FAIR Plan does not have the money to pay out all claims, it collects money from insurance companies that operate in California via an assessment. The FAIR Plan collected a $150 million assessment in 1993 following fires in Altadena and Malibu, $60 million in 1994, $50 million in 1995 following the Northridge Earthquake, and $1 billion in 2025 for the Plan's $4 billion liability from the Eaton and Palisades fires. As part of a 2024 policy change, insurers are now allowed to pass part of their assessment to customers via a surcharge, which in this case (2025 fires) cost the median homeowner $28.

Insurance companies had been concerned that if the FAIR Plan does not have the money to pay out all its claims, it will collect money through an assessment on all insurance companies operating in the state, but that California's regulators may not allow the companies to recoup that expense by raising rates or allowing surcharges, leading companies to stop doing business in California. In a July 2024 agreement with the State Insurance Commissioner, the FAIR Plan is now allowed to require licensed insurers to cover up to $2 billion ($1 billion of residential and $1 billion of commercial) of payments to FAIR Plan policy holders if FAIR Plan payouts exceed its reserves and reinsurance. Under this new agreement, insurance companies could then pass on 50% those assessment amounts as a one-time surcharge to their customers, and for any amounts exceeding the ($1 billion for residential and $1 billion for commercial) thresholds, could pass on 100% of that amount to customers. Residential and commercial customers are separated; residential customers would not be charged for commercial surcharges, and vice versa. The FAIR Plan does not have a role in determining how insurers manage associated costs once an assessment is approved by the California Insurance Commissioner.

== Recent growth ==
Insurance companies were prohibited from passing on the cost of reinsurance to customers, and were not allowed to use predictions of future fires for pricing insurance policies, instead being required to use historical fire information from the previous 20 years at each location. In 2017, high resolution computer models predicted that statewide, rare but devastating wildfires would increase total yearly costs by 55%. With the knowledge of those models, followed by the 2017 and 2018 wildfires, in which California's insurers paid out claims equal to all the profits they made over the previous 25 years (more than $12 billion), insurers started worrying about their future solvency. After losing $6.7 billion in 2022 and $6.3 billion in 2023, State Farm in March 2024 declined to renew 72,000 policies, stating that it is their "responsibility to maintain adequate claims-paying capacity for our customers and to comply with applicable financial solvency laws." By March 2024, seven of the state's twelve largest insurers, including Allstate, Chubb, Farmers, Nationwide, Travellers, State Farm, and USAA stopped writing new policies in California. In December 2024, it was announced that insurance companies will (for the first time in California) be allowed to pass on the costs of their reinsurance to consumers, in an attempt to convince more insurance companies to write policies in California, and thereby reduce the use of the FAIR Plan. In order to do so, they will have to write 5% more policies (for comprehensive coverage) for high fire risk properties every two years, until the percentage of their high fire risk policy holdings reaches 85% of their statewide market share (8.5% of policies issued for a company with 10% market share). Insurance companies will also now be allowed to use computer based "catastrophe modelling" for setting rates.

Between 2023 and 2024, the number of homes in the ZIP code affected by the January 2025 Palisades fire covered by the FAIR Plan almost doubled.

== See also ==
- 1988 California Proposition 103
- California Department of Insurance
- Citizens Property Insurance Corporation ("Citizens") similar organization to California's FAIR in Florida
