= Healthcare in California =

This article summarizes healthcare in California.

== California State Department of Health Care Services ==
The California Department of Health manages state government projects in California.

== Health insurance ==
As of 2018, most insured Californians were in plans regulated by the California Department of Managed Health Care (DMHC) with about 60% regulated by either DMHC or the California Department of Insurance (CDI). This dual regulation arose due for historical reasons, and when the DMHC was created in 2000, the California legislature requested a report on merging the health insurer responsibilities with the CDI. Dual regulation has also raised questions around the applicability of premium tax to the DHMC-regulated entities, which have historically not paid premium taxes while CDI-regulated entities have. Value-based pay for performance managed care plans where providers take on risk have arisen, and in 2019 the DHMC announced plans to regulate these "risk-bearing entities".

California requires that most individuals maintain health insurance coverage. Those who do not must pay a monthly penalty as part of their California income taxes. The monthly penalty for 2024 was $348. Democrats in California adopted this provision in 2019 after Republicans in the US Congress eliminated the similar federal penalty in the 2017 Tax Cuts and Jobs Act.

=== Medi-Cal ===
Medi-Cal is California's version of Medicaid. Medicaid was enacted in 1965 by the United States federal government to provide a public insurance program for low-income patients. The funding for Medi-Cal is provided by the federal government.

Additionally, under the Affordable Care Act, low-income coverage could be expanded to nearly all low-income patients depending on how states chose to use the funding provided by the ACA. After the passage of the ACA, 32 states used the funding of the ACA to expand their state's low-income insurance programs, such as Medi-Cal, and 19 states opted out. The 19 states, as of 2014, had a 15% higher poverty rate than the 32 states that chose to expand their services. California was one of the states to expand its Medicaid program.

As of September 2022, about 15.28 million people, or around 40% of California residents were covered by Medi-Cal. It is administered by the California Department of Health Care Services, which operates it in accordance with California's Medicaid State Plan and Title XIX of the Social Security Act.

California relies on Affordable Care Act (ACA) funding to support the Covered California program. In 2014, a collaborative effort between UCLA and UC Berkeley produced a model aimed at estimating the impact of the ACA on insurance coverage in the state. This model compares real-time data sets of insurance coverage in 2014 to a baseline scenario without ACA coverage. By doing so, the model can project future enrollment numbers in California health programs. According to this model, at some point in time, an estimated 1.1 to 1.3 million Californians will be enrolled in Covered California. Simultaneously, Medi-Cal enrollment is anticipated to reach an unprecedented high, ranging from 7.4 to 7.8 million individuals.

Notably, the model refrains from providing specific projected years or dates. This cautious approach stems from its reliance on 2014 data, preventing precise predictions of the evolving landscape of health insurance programs in subsequent years. Nevertheless, the model serves as a tool for policymakers and researchers, facilitating an understanding of how diverse segments of the population are likely to be covered under various health insurance plans.

=== Private markets ===
As of 2015, about 14.1 million people were insured privately, including in self-funded plans; 1.3 million were in plans regulated by the CDI and 12.7 million were in plans regulated by the DHMC. Kaiser Permanente had about 50% of the market, followed by Blue Shield of California, Anthem Blue Cross, and Health Net (a subsidiary of Centene).

L.A. Care was among the top six in 2015, and the largest county-based insurer. As of 2017, UnitedHealthcare was sixth-largest.

==== Marketplace ====
Covered California is the health insurance marketplace.

Kaiser Permanente and Blue Shield of California had about two-thirds of the market share as of 2018. In 2017 Anthem stopped selling on the exchange.

== Healthcare Providers in California ==
The table below shows the top Health Provider classifications by Specialty and ACA Plan Participation, with primary practice addresses in California. Also, 35333 pharmacists in California staff 10159 pharmacies (7240 pharmacies accept ACA plans) according to the NPPES via summary report by Pharmacy Near Me pharmacy locator.

Data compiled from public datasets. "Accept ACA Plans" indicates providers accepting ACA health plans based on machine-readable insurer data.
Provider Classification	Providers	Accept ACA Plans	ACA coverage (%)
Acupuncturist	14176	2138	15.08
Allergy & Immunology	1012	90	8.89
Anesthesiology	11558	721	6.24
Audiologist	1968	123	6.25
Behavior Analyst	24763	5361	21.65
Chiropractor	18115	2487	13.73
Dentist	55245	23147	41.90
Dermatology	3779	344	9.10
Emergency Medicine	10777	1140	10.58
Family Medicine	25547	1846	7.23
Internal Medicine	47093	3748	7.96
Nurse Practitioner	38705	3818	9.86
Obstetrics & Gynecology	9026	678	7.51
Ophthalmology	4974	1329	26.72
Optometrist	12265	6990	56.99
Orthopaedic Surgery	5897	609	10.33
Pediatrics	16331	1466	8.98
Physician Assistant	19688	1644	8.35
Podiatrist	4025	228	5.66
Primary Care Physician (PCP)	68690	5179	7.54
Psychologist	28078	3523	12.55
Registered Nurse	29365	830	2.83
Social Worker	48055	6154	12.81
Surgery	7820	837	10.70
Urology	2233	223	9.99

== Types of Coverage ==
Insurance can be offered in an individual or group plan.

=== Group Insurance ===
A group insurance plan is a type of health plan that gets an individual through a job, union or a retiree. Also called employer-based coverage, health insurance through a group plan is by a group of employees and their dependents who are insured together under an employer policy.

Group insurances should be considered when one is self-employed, a contractor, work part-time, or are ineligible for employee-sponsored coverage.

Employers can choose to enroll or decline a coverage that they are eligible for. Premium payments, if enrolled, may be covered by the employers. It is up to the employer whether or not they may cover premium costs.

According to the Affordable Care Act, employers with more than 50 full-time employees must offer health insurance that meets minimum requirements for coverage and cost or be subjected to a fee.

=== Individual Insurance ===
An individual insurance plan is a type of health plan that an individual buys for themselves, or for themselves and their family. It is bought outside of an employer or association.

Individual insurance is primarily accessed through Covered California- the state's official health insurance marketplace. You are able to shop for individual insurance if you do not get health insurance through an employer and do not quality for Medi-Cal or other public programs.

The Affordable Care Act allows for Covered California to exist as a method of being able to buy private insurance. Individuals, families, and small businesses are able to buy insurance from the market place. Covered California is also able to help identify if an individual qualifies for Medi-Cal.

== Healthcare by region ==
=== Los Angeles ===
Los Angeles offers all available health care services. Notable health systems or hospitals in the region include Los Angeles County Department of Health Services, Kaiser Permanente, UCLA Health, Cedars-Sinai, Verity Health, Providence Health, UCI Medical Center, and Keck Hospital of USC.

=== San Francisco Bay Area ===
San Francisco offers all available health care services. Large health systems in Northern California include Sutter Health, Kaiser Permanente, UCSF Health, Dignity Health, and Stanford Medical.

In 2018, a lawsuit was filed against Sutter Health for alleged antitrust.

=== San Diego ===
San Diego offers all available health care services. Notable health systems or hospitals in the region include Scripps Health, Kaiser Permanente, Naval Medical Center San Diego, UC San Diego Health, Tri-City Medical Center, Palomar Health, and Sharp HealthCare.

== Infrastructure ==
- Health care districts in California

== Proposed single-payer healthcare ==
A single-payer health care system for California has been suggested multiple times. Two bills in the California State Legislature that would have implemented universal health coverage were vetoed by Governor Arnold Schwarzenegger in 2006 and 2008, respectively. A 2021 proposal for single-payer healthcare, AB 1400, also known as CalCare, was presented in the State Assembly, and renewed discussion about unilateral state-wide universal healthcare. On January 31, 2022 the bill was shelved and not voted on by the assembly. SB770 passed, allowing Medicare and Medicaid funds to be used in a potential single-payer system. A single-payer system was proposed again in early 2024, but did not pass.

== Outbreaks, plagues, and epidemics ==
- COVID-19 pandemic in California

== See also ==
- California Medical Association
- California Health and Safety Code
- California Senate Bill 277 removed personal belief as exemption from vaccination requirements for entry to schools
