= Ian Wallach =

American lawyer

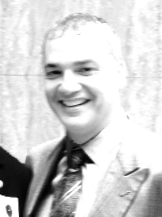
- Born: Ian Michael Wallach
- Education: Juris Doctor
- Alma mater: U.C. Hastings College of Law
- Occupation: Attorney-At-Law
- Employer(s): The Law Offices of Ian Wallach, PC, owner Feldman & Wallach, LLP, founding partner
- Website: www.wallachlegal.com www.feldmanwallach.com

Ian Wallach is an American lawyer and founding partner of the Law Offices of Ian Wallach, P.C. He is a legal news commentator who has appeared on regional, national, and international television and radio shows speaking on current legal issues.

== Early life and education ==
Wallach earned his J.D. from U.C. Hastings in 1999. During his time at U.C. Hastings, he was enrolled in an International Law concentration which led him to clerk with the Office of the Prosecutor for the International Tribunal for Yugoslavia. He also participated in drafting the indictment of Slobodan Milošević which contributed to his overthrow in 2000.

== Career ==
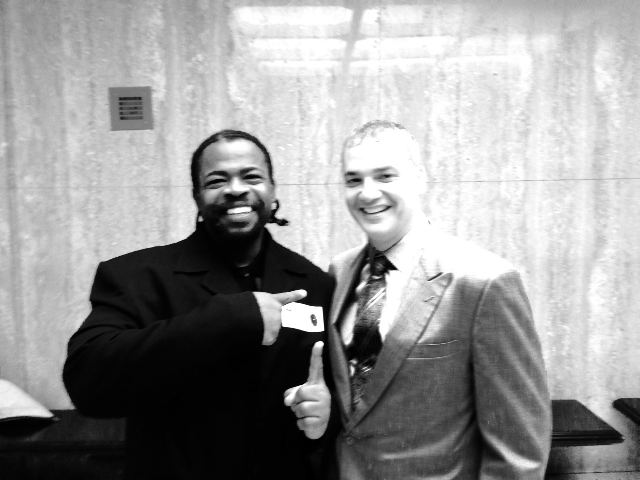
Photo of Ian Wallach with client Peter Nelson, Jr. following dismissal of case in Los Angeles Superior Court, Compton Courthouse, December 19, 2013.

Wallach previously worked as an associate at Luce, Forward, Hamilton & Scripps in their New York office. He left the firm in 2005 and moved to California to join the Office of the Public Defender. He co-founded Feldman & Wallach, LLP in 2010 with Jason Feldman, an attorney he previously met while transitioning to the public defender's office in 2005. In 2015 he founded his own firm, The Law Offices of Ian Wallach, PC, with offices in Los Angeles and New York.

In 2018, Wallach was nominated to serve on the board of directors for the National Association of Criminal Defense Lawyers (NACDL), a professional bar association founded in 1958 advancing the mission of the nation's criminal defense lawyers to ensure justice and due process for persons accused of crime or other misconduct.

=== Stevie Wonder extortion ===
Wallach represented Alpha L. Walker who was accused along with his girlfriend in 2012 of extorting Stevie Wonder. Walker was accused of threatening to sell a video with him talking about Wonder's treatment of his family if Wonder did not pay him $5 million. Walker later pleaded no contest to a misdemeanor under a plea deal and was sentenced to time served. The plea included the charge to be expunged if Walker complies with the terms of his release.

During the Stevie Wonder trial, microphones were discovered hidden at counsel table by the tabloid magazine/show enterprise TMZ. Ian Wallach brought an action in federal court against TMZ alleging a violation of his client's right to privacy and counsel. TMZ has a record of never settling actions and not losing Anti-Slapp suits, but this matter was settled shortly after it was filed.

=== Guantanamo Bay pro bono work ===
Wallach performed pro bono work for the Center for Constitutional Rights, representing Guantanamo Bay detainees. He most notably represented Alla Ali Bin Ali Ahmed, a 23-year-old Yemeni citizen arrested in Pakistan in 2002 and transferred to Guantanamo Bay detention camp. Wallach obtained a court order for the Bush administration to turn over information regarding Ahmed, the first time the government had been ordered to do so after the passage of the Detainee Treatment Act. Ahmed was later ordered to be released from Guantanamo. Wallach also received a special thanks for his habeas corpus work in Guantanomo in the book Poems From Guantánamo.

In March 2006, Ian Wallach authored an article for "The Jurist", the legal newspaper for the University of Pittsburgh, titled "No Habeas at Guantanamo? The Executive and the Dubious Tale of the DTA" asserting that the US Executive Branch likely engaged in questionable acts, and disseminated inaccurate information, to encourage Senate passage of provisions in the Detainee Treatment Act, in an effort to prevent federal judges from seeing that the evidence allegedly supporting indefinite pre-trial detention was problematic and, sometimes, nonexistent.

=== Valley Fever - California prisons ===
Wallach and his partner Jason Feldman were the lead attorneys representing Arjang Panah, a former inmate in the federal prison system who sued the United States federal government over contracting Valley fever in 2006 while incarcerated at Taft Correctional Institution in Kern County, California. Prior to Panah's case, eleven inmates had filed claims with the California Victim Compensation and Government Claims Board related to Valley Fever, all of which were denied. U.S. District Court Judge Gary Feess refused to dismiss the lawsuit at the request of the government, allowing the case to move forward to trial.

The lawsuit was settled out of court, with Panah receiving $425,000 from the government. In May 2013, the CDC began an investigation into deaths at 2 California state prisons related to Valley Fever. This was after medical receiver J. Clark Kelso ordered the move of over 3,000 inmates susceptible to the illness from the federal prison system in California. U.S. District Judge Thelton Henderson later ordered the state of California to move 2,600 inmates from certain California state prisons that were susceptible to the illness. Since the Panah action, hundreds of other inmates have brought similar claims against the United States related to Valley Fever at Taft Correctional Institution.

Feldman & Wallach, LLP, along with the Raymond Boucher and the class action law firm Arias Ozello & Gignac, LLP, brought a class action against the State of California, Governor Jerry Brown, and other California State officials arising out of exposing hyper-susceptible inmates to Valley Fever at the Pleasant Valley State Prison. Other similar actions have since been filed.

Ian Wallach argued the 9th Circuit consolidated cases of Edison v. USA, et al. & Nuwintore v. USA, et al., presently available at 2016 U.S. App. LEXIS 9250 (May 20, 2016), reinstating the rights of present and former inmates of African descent to sue the US for claims arising out of Valley Fever infections at Taft Correctional Facility. The decision details the limits of sovereign immunity under the "Independent Contractor Exception" to the Federal Tort Claims Act: the consolidated cases of Edison v. USA, et al., No. 14-15472 and Nuwintore v. USA, et al., No. 14-17546 (9th Cir. 2016) - the decision is available here.

=== Dontre Hamilton ===
Ian Wallach was counsel to the family of Dontre Hamilton who was shot 14 times by police officer Christopher Manney who woke Hamilton from a nap in Red Arrow Park Milwaukee. No charges were brought against Christopher Manney for killing Dontre Hamilton. But Christopher Manney was fired for engaging in an unlawful pat-town of Hamilton. Manney appealed that decision to the Milwaukee Fire and Police Commission, who upheld the decision to terminate him. Christopher Manney sought judicial review of the Fire and Police Commission's review. On June 26, 2016, Judge Richard Sankovitz of the Milwaukee County Circuit Court in Wisconsin upheld the decision of the Fire and Police Commission that the termination was appropriate. Ultimately, in April 2017, in the civil action brought by the estate of Dontre Hamilton, the Court granted summary judgment to Plaintiffs and United States District Court Judge Stadtmueller held that these proceedings precluded Manney from again litigating whether or not the search was unreasonable, and held that, as a matter of law, the search was unreasonable. Ian Wallach contributed to the brief [Motion for Summary Judgment by All Plaintiffs, J.M. et al v. City of Milwaukee et al, 2:16-cv-00507-JPS, ECF No. 45, 2/01/2017]. As of May 9, 2017, the parties had reached a tentative settlement of 2.3 million dollars — which may have constituted the largest settlement in the history of Milwaukee for a civil rights case.

=== Barry Montgomery, Jr ===
Wallach represented Barry Montgomery in the case Barry John Montgomery v. County of Los Angeles, et al., Los Angeles Superior Court Case No. BC692204. In July 2014, Barry Montgomery was confronted by deputies at the Enterprise Park for alleged possession or marijuana. Montgomery punched one of the deputies on the shoulder. The deputies then punched him several times in what they termed as getting him under control while fearing he was reaching for a weapon. At the time, Montgomery was on medication as he had been diagnosed as a schizophrenic with Tourette syndrome.

Montgomery suffered facial fractures, fractured eye socket, seven broken ribs among other injuries. The Los Angeles County Board of Supervisors agreed to a $2.75 million settlement for the case.

=== Ruben Martinez, Jr. ===
In the case of Martinez v. City of Los Angeles, Anthony Razo, Salvador Lizarraga, William Eagleson, Gilbert Silva, Jesus Linn and Marilyn Droz, Wallach was one of Martinez's attorney in subsequent accusations along with Nick Brustin and others. In the case, Martinez was alleged to have been at the workplace between 2005 and 2007 when the armed robbery was said to have happened. Ruben Martinez spent 12 years in prison and in 2019, Los Angeles County Superior Court Judge William Ryan found him to be innocent of the alleged crimes and dismissed his case with prejudice. Martinez was released in 2019 after two of the victims testified at that trial that Martinez was not the robber. The review unit determined that Martinez was not the robber.

To avoid facing the jury, the city of the City of Los Angeles agreed to pay Martinez $8 million.

=== Pedro Martinez ===
In 2023, Wallach and Katherine McBroom represented Pedro Martinez, a school janitor who was accused of sexually abusing multiple students. Pedro Martinez was arrested in January 2019 by San Bernardino County Sheriff’s Department deputies. He worked as a janitor at Maple Elementary School and was alleged to have molested several 6-year-old boys from the same school and one six-year-old girl. Martinez was charged with 10 counts of child sex abuse and one count of lewd conduct. The trial began in August 2023 at the Superior Court of California, San Bernardino County Joshua Tree Courthouse. The lewd conduct count was dismissed mid-trial. On December 11, 2023, Martinez was acquitted of all remaining counts by the jury, having spent over five years incarcerated awaiting trial.

Wallach, Martinez’s attorney, accused the San Bernardino County Sheriff’s Department deputy for not following appropriate protocols while conducting the investigations. He accused the deputy for interviewing a 6 year old child with leading and suggestive questions.

=== Legal commentary ===
Wallach has provided legal commentary for regional, national, and international media outlets and has been quoted in the press on current legal issues. He has appeared on Entertainment Tonight, America Now with Andy Dean, KTLA, Valley Public Radio and CCTV America discussing legal topics such as the Amanda Knox murder trial in Italy, the Boston Marathon bombings, and Chelsea Manning.

Wallach is the host of "Wallach-On-Law", a talk show dedicated to issues of criminal justice reform.

Wallach maintains a blog titled "Renovate Justice" discussing issues on criminal justice reform. He also maintains a blog of trial commentaries.

== Publication ==
Wallach writes on issues of fertility and loss and is the author of “A Father's Story: Mourning the Baby We Never Had”, reprinted in “The Longest Date, Life as a Wife” by Cindy Chupack.
