= 1988 California Proposition 103 =

Ballot initiative for insurance rate adjustments

Proposition 103
- Insurance Rate Reductions and Regulation Initiative

Results
Choice	Votes	%
Yes	4,844,312	51.13%
No	4,630,752	48.87%
County results
For
60%–70%
50%–60%
Against
70%–80%
60%–70%
50%–60%

Proposition 103, titled Insurance Rate Reduction and Reform Act, was a California ballot proposition voted on in the 1988 California General Election. It passed with 51% of the vote on November 8, 1988. Proposition 103 expanded the regulatory capacities of the California Department of Insurance, especially in property and casualty insurance.

The ballot measure required insurers to reduce their rates by at least 20 percent. In addition, the act expanded the Department's responsibility for enforcement to include: property insurance, automobile insurance, life insurance and other types of casualty coverage, requiring that the Department approve rates submitted by insurers prior to their taking effect. The law also made the California Insurance Commissioner an elected position (previously being a governor-appointed position).

Proposition 103 devised a process enabling consumer participation in the setting of insurance rates, and allowed consumer "intervenors" witness fees and expenses in some cases.

== Insurance regulation ==
Insurance types regulated by Proposition 103 are: Personal automobile, dwelling fire, earthquake, homeowners, inland marine, and umbrella; Commercial aircraft, automobile, boiler and machinery, burglary and theft, business owners, earthquake, farm owners, some fidelity, fire, glass, inland marine, medical malpractice, miscellaneous, multi-peril, other liability, professional liability, special multi-peril, umbrella, and coverage under the Longshore and Harbor Workers' Compensation Act.

According to the California Insurance Commissioner, Proposition 103 "has saved consumers billions" since being implemented, specifically a $4.29 billion per year dividend. It also claims "Californians spent 0.3% less on auto insurance in 2010 than they spent in 1989, while the nation spent 43.3% more". The Commissioner quotes a 2013 report of the Consumer Federation that more than $100 billion had been saved by consumers in the 25 years after passage.

== Intervenors ==
Investigatory and regulatory hearings are open to intervenors. Members of the public or organizations can observe or may attend the hearing and request to be heard, submit written comments or present live testimony. Attorney fees can be reimbursed when written comments are submitted that "make a substantial contribution within the time frame in the notice".

== Election ==
With $207 million spent, the most expensive election campaign in U.S. modern history was the 1988 California insurance initiatives election battle. Once Prop. 103 won voter approval. The $207 million spent, in 2020 dollars adjusted for inflation, which was $95 million in 1988, was reported by the Los Angeles Times.

Opponents of Prop. 103 spent over $200 million trying to defeat it or trying to pass competing initiatives. Prop. 103 raised $6.4 million in small donations of about $30 from a statewide door-to-door canvass. These small donations from the canvass paid for the modest offices and canvasser salaries, which going into the election reached one million households. TV ads for Prop. 103 were run at no cost by TV stations only due to the fairness doctrine in place at the time, with some equal-time ads. These ads were in response to the tens of millions of dollars being spent by the insurance industry, which also used large direct-mail campaigns, coordinated by consultant Clint Reilly, who acknowledged the efforts against Prop. 103 by insurance companies lacked a lot of public support. With $200 million spent among the other initiatives, both pro and con, however, it came down to the wire, with Prop. 103 winning by only 1%, with a 51% yes vote. The campaign, and its results, received extensive national attention. Court challenges were turned down, and the California Supreme Court upheld every provision of 103.

"Three other insurance measures--Proposition 104, the industry's no-fault proposal, Proposition 100, backed by the state's trial lawyers, and Proposition 101, ... sponsored by dissident insurer Harry Miller,--all were overwhelmingly defeated," reported Kenneth Reich, the L.A. Times staff writer who covered the insurance industry and this election. Reich wrote "But Proposition 103 campaign chairman Harvey Rosenfield suggested that if the insurance industry was in trouble with the public, it had only itself to blame."

== Criticism ==
In the aftermath of the devastating January 2025 Southern California wildfires, Steven Greenhut of the R Street Institute harshly criticized Proposition 103 for pushing the state's property insurance system to the brink of collapse by imposing a "byzantine" system of price controls which had already caused most insurers to flee the state because it was impossible for them to earn a profit. In arguing for the imposition of conditions on the release of federal aid to California wildfire victims, U.S. Senator Ron Johnson (R-WI) criticized the "moral hazard" inherent in California's "laws where they made it very unattractive for private insurers to come in and actually insure their properties and assess the risk properly" and thereby "encouraged people to build multimillion ... homes and complexes in very vulnerable areas". Reuters reported that California's price controls were so effective that before the Palisades Fire, insurance costs in Pacific Palisades, California (which was mostly wiped out) were cheaper than in 97% of all ZIP Codes in the United States. Kelsey Piper of Vox identified those price controls as one of several examples of incompetent governance before and during the wildfires that were leading Californians to the sinking realization that "no matter how bad things get, the real grown-ups can’t be called in to save the day because they don’t exist".

== See also ==
- California FAIR Plan
