= Bashore =

Bashore is a surname. Notable people with the surname include:

- Juliet Bashore (born 1956), American filmmaker
- Kayla Bashore (born 1983), American field hockey player
- Lee T. Bashore (1898–1944), American politician
- Walt Bashore (1909–1984), American athlete
