= California's 49th district =

California's 49th district may refer to:

- California's 49th congressional district
- California's 49th State Assembly district
