= DMHC =

DMHC can refer to:

- California Department of Managed Health Care State of California government agency, United States.
- Dickinson Mental Health Center in Pennsylvania, United States
- Detroit Medical Health Connection in Michigan, United States
