= Twohey's =

Diner in South Pasadena, California, US

Coordinates: 34.1209°N 118.1500°W

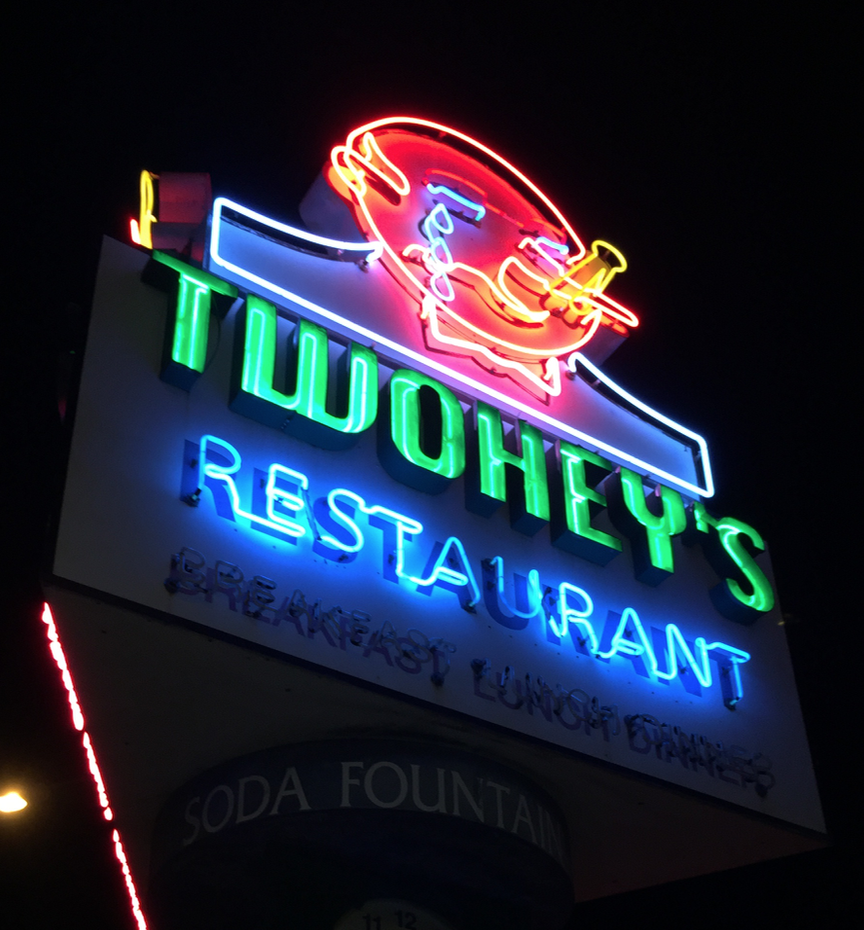
- The diner's neon roadside sign at the Alhambra location.
- Industry: 1950s diner
- Founded: 1943
- Founder: Jack Twohey; Jean Twohey
- Headquarters: 424 Fair Oaks Avenue, South Pasadena, California, U.S.
- Owner: Tanya Christos; Greg Mallis

Twohey's (/ˈtuːi/ TOO-ees) is an American 1950s-style diner located at 424 Fair Oaks Avenue in South Pasadena, California, US. It was founded in 1943, and is home of the “Little Stink-O" burger.

== History ==
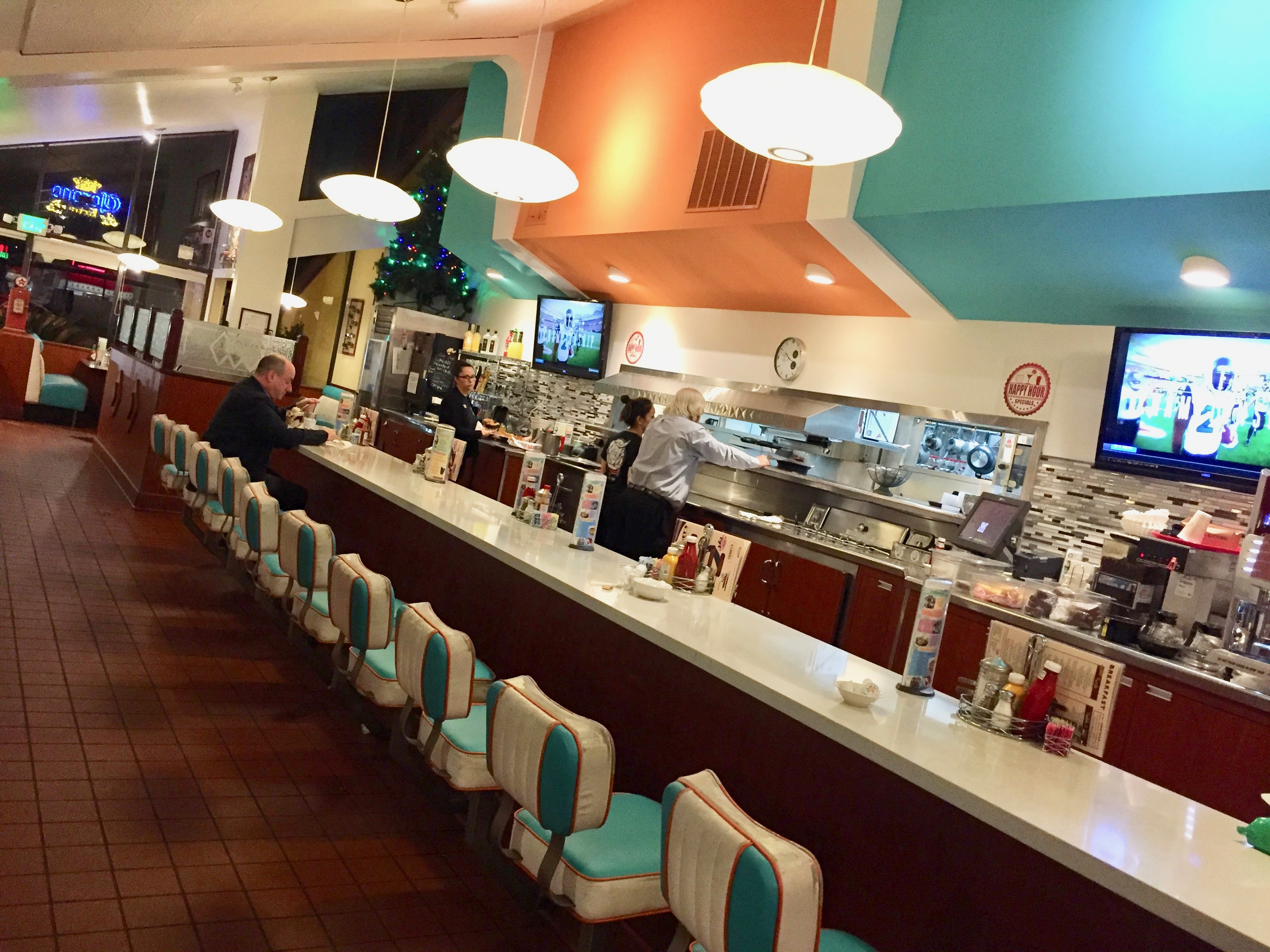
Twohey's Alhambra location, 2025

Twohey's was originally opened in 1943 and located on Arroyo Boulevard in Pasadena, California as a 37-seat diner, and since 1951, on Huntington Drive in Alhambra, California. Jack and Jean Twohey founded the establishment. At its Alhambra location, the restaurant featured drive-up carhop service from the 1950s to the mid-1970s.

In December 2017, it was announced that Twohey's Alhambra location would close due to an issue with the lease renewal. On April 13, 2019, the building was vacated, with an announcement that the historic building would be razed.

The business moved to its new location on October 10, 2020, with a new seating capacity of 199 seats. In 2023, a five-day-long 80th anniversary celebration for the restaurant took place, with the kitchen concocting special cocktails such as “The Nifty Fifty,” “Rockin '80s” and “The Celebration” for the occasion and 80-cent mini-sundaes available with the purchase of any entree. In addition, Twohey's was granted a Certificate of Congressional Recognition by a field representative for Rep. Judy Chu, 28th District; the California Legislature Assembly Resolution, presented by Sen. Anthony Portantino and Assemblymember Mike Fong; the County of Los Angeles Proclamation, presented by a field representative for Supervisor Kathryn Barger, 5th District, Los Angeles County; and the City of South Pasadena Certificate of Recognition, presented by Councilmember Jack Donovan.
