= California Department of Managed Health Care =

The Department of Managed Health Care (DMHC) is a regulatory body governing managed health care plans, including Health Maintenance Organizations (HMOs) and most Medi-Cal managed care plans in California. The DMHC was created as the first state department in the country solely dedicated to regulating managed health care plans and assisting consumers to resolve disputes with their health plans. The DMHC Help Center educates consumers about their health care rights, resolves consumer complaints, helps consumers navigate and understand their coverage and assists consumers in getting timely access to appropriate health care services.

The DMHC Help Center provides direct assistance in all languages to health care consumers through the Department’s website, www.DMHC.ca.gov.

Mary Watanabe is currently the director of the DMHC. The DMHC is part of the California Health and Human Services Agency. It was established in 2000 and is responsible for enforcing the Knox-Keene Health Care Service Plan Act of 1975, and other related laws and regulations.

== Dual health insurance regulation ==
The DMHC regulates the majority of state-regulated health care coverage in California including 96% of commercial and government health plan enrollment in state-regulated plans. However, not all health plans operating in California are under the jurisdiction of the DMHC; for example, some preferred provider organizations are regulated by the California Department of Insurance (CDI). Two state-based health insurance regulators is unusual in the United States, and has led to various additional work to synchronize laws. This dual regulation arose due for historical reasons, and when the DMHC was created in 2000, the California legislature requested a report on merging the health insurer responsibilities with the CDI. In 2001, J. Clark Kelso, who served as acting California Insurance Commissioner in 2000, produced a report outlining costs and benefits of agency consolidation.

In addition, the federal government regulates health insurance for members of the military, and "self-insured" or ERISA plans, offered by some large employers are under the jurisdiction of the U.S. Department of Labor.

== Knox-Keene licenses ==
In 2025, 98 full-service health plans licensed by the DMHC provided health care services to 30.2 million Californians. This included 13.6 million commercial enrollees and approximately 16.6 million government enrollees. In addition to full-service health plans, the DMHC oversees 41 specialized health plans including chiropractic, dental, vision, behavioral health (psychological) and pharmacy.

== Consumer Complaints and Independent Medical Review ==
The Department of Managed Health Care (DMHC) Help Center assists people in resolving problems with their health plans. Most members usually file a complaint, also called a grievance, to their health plan. Health plans generally have 30 days to respond. If the member does not agree with the answer, or the plan has not answered within 30 days, the member may ask the DMHC Help Center for help. Some urgent matters can go directly to the department.

Members may also ask for an Independent Medical Review (IMR) when their health plan denies certain medical services or treatments. The department decides whether the request qualifies. If it does, doctors who do not work for the health plan review the case. An IMR costs the member nothing. When an IMR finds in favor of the member, the health plan must authorize the service or treatment.

== Public Education and communication ==
The DMHC shares information to help people understand their health care rights. This information is shared on its website, in fact sheets, newsletters, and public announcements. Its materials cover topics such as timely access to care, behavioral health care, and how to seek help with a health plan. Some fact sheets are offered in English and Spanish. In its Spring 2026 newsletter, the department described health care rights materials and social media resources about access to behavioral health treatment.

The department also sends letters called All Plan Letters and All Licensee Letters to health plans. These letters explain laws, reporting requirements, and rules they must follow. They are different from the notices health plans send to their members.

== Oversight of access to care ==
The DMHC checks to make sure health plans have enough doctors and other health care providers for their members. Health plans must send reports to the DMHC about how long members wait for appointments and which doctors are in their networks. The department reviews these reports to make sure health plans are following California law. If a health plan is not meeting the rules, it may have to explain why and provide a plan to fix the problem. The DMHC also shares reports with the public about access to care.

== History ==
The agency was created in July 2000, in the wake of widespread dissatisfaction with managed care across the country and in response to concerns that the prior regulator, the California Department of Corporations, lacked medical and consumer protection expertise. At the time of its creation, California was the largest market for health maintenance organizations (HMOs) in the United States.

After it was created, Kaiser Permanente challenged its authority in court, but did not succeed.

== See also ==
- Healthcare in California
