= Harry W. Low =

American lawyer and judge (1931–2021)

California Insurance Commissioner
- In office September 18, 2000 – January 6, 2003
- Governor: Gray Davis
- Preceded by: Chuck Quackenbush
- Succeeded by: John Garamendi

Presiding Justice of Division Five of the California Court of Appeal, First Appellate District
- In office December 29, 1982 – December 31, 1991
- Appointed by: Jerry Brown

Judge of the San Francisco Superior Court
- In office July 3, 1974 – December 29, 1982
- Appointed by: Ronald Reagan

Judge of the San Francisco Municipal Court
- In office December 29, 1966 – July 3, 1974
- Appointed by: Pat Brown

Personal details
- Born: March 12, 1931 Oakdale, California, U.S.
- Died: December 9, 2021 (aged 90)
- Spouse: Mayling Jue Low
- Children: 3
- Education: University of California, Berkeley (BA); UC Berkeley School of Law (JD)
- Profession: Lawyer, judge, mediator, arbitrator

Harry W. Low (March 12, 1931 – December 9, 2021) was an American lawyer, judge, mediator, and public official. In 1966, he became the first Chinese American judge in the San Francisco Bay Area and the first Chinese American judge in Northern California when Governor Pat Brown appointed him to the San Francisco Municipal Court. Low was also one of the youngest judges in the United States at age 35. He later served on the San Francisco Superior Court and the California Court of Appeal, where he became presiding justice of Division Five of the First Appellate District.

After retiring from the judiciary in 1992, Low worked as a mediator and arbitrator. He also held several public-service positions in San Francisco and, from 2000 to 2003, served as California Insurance Commissioner after being appointed by Governor Gray Davis.

Low's career spanned more than six decades and included service in the California Department of Justice, the state judiciary, municipal commissions, state government, and private dispute resolution.

== Early life and education ==
Low was born on March 12, 1931, in Oakdale, California. While attending high school, he worked as a janitor at a small law firm in Oakdale. Low later recalled that the experience influenced his interest in the legal profession, and by the time he entered the University of California, Berkeley, he had decided to pursue law.

Low earned his undergraduate degree from the University of California, Berkeley, and graduated from the university's Boalt Hall School of Law in 1955. He later recalled that Asian Americans were still rare in California's legal profession at the time and that private law firms would not interview him despite his academic record.

Early in his legal career, Low became active in public service and community organizations. He regularly visited the Chinese Consolidated Benevolent Association in San Francisco's Chinatown, where he offered legal assistance and advice.

After graduation, a Boalt Hall professor suggested that Low seek work with the California Attorney General's office. In 1956, he joined the office as a deputy attorney general in its San Francisco regional office. He remained a state prosecutor for about a decade before his appointment to the bench in 1966.

== Legal and judicial career ==
Low worked for the California Department of Justice for approximately a decade before seeking a judicial appointment. In late 1966, Governor Pat Brown appointed him to the San Francisco Municipal Court. The appointment made Low the first Chinese American judge in San Francisco and the first Chinese American judge in Northern California. He was 35 years old when he joined the bench. His appointment came during a period in which relatively few Asian Americans held judicial positions in California.

In 1974, Low moved to the San Francisco Superior Court. His elevation made him the first Chinese American to serve on that court. He remained on the Superior Court until his appointment to the state appellate judiciary.

In 1982, Governor Jerry Brown appointed Low to the California Court of Appeal, First Appellate District, in San Francisco. He later became presiding justice of Division Five of the First District Court of Appeal. By 1989, state records listed him as the division's presiding justice. He remained on the Court of Appeal until his retirement from the state judiciary in 1992.

== Mediation and arbitration ==
Following his retirement from the California Court of Appeal in 1992, Low joined JAMS (Judicial Arbitration and Mediation Services), a private alternative dispute resolution organization, where he worked as a mediator and neutral. He remained active with JAMS for more than two decades.

Low mediated a range of disputes, including matters involving members of the Chinese American community. In one case, he mediated a dispute between competing Chinese-language newspapers based in Hong Kong and Taiwan and helped the parties reach a settlement.

Low continued working with JAMS until near the end of his life in 2021.

== Public and community service ==
In addition to his judicial career, Low was active in civic and Chinese American community organizations in San Francisco. He served as president of the San Francisco Police Commission from 1992 to 1996, becoming the first Chinese American to hold that position. In 1999 he also served on the San Francisco Human Rights Commission.

Low was involved in organizations that promoted Chinese American political and civic participation. He was associated with the Chinese American Democratic Club in San Francisco and was one of its early leaders.

Low's community involvement also extended to education and cultural projects. He was a co-founder of the Chinese American International School, described as San Francisco's first private bilingual school. He also received an Emmy Award for his involvement in the production of Broken Promises, Broken Dreams, a documentary about the Chinese Exclusion Act.

== California Insurance Commissioner ==
On July 31, 2000, Governor Gray Davis selected Low to become California Insurance Commissioner following the resignation of Commissioner Chuck Quackenbush. Quackenbush had resigned while facing investigations concerning the California Department of Insurance's handling of settlements with insurance companies following the 1994 Northridge earthquake. Davis selected Low, a retired appellate judge, to complete the remainder of Quackenbush's term.

Low was sworn in as California's 37th Insurance Commissioner on September 18, 2000. California Supreme Court Justice Stanley Mosk administered the oath of office.

Soon after taking office, Low reorganized portions of the California Department of Insurance. Among the changes were the creation of an Office of Community and Constituent Affairs and a Strategic Planning, Policy and Research Branch.

Low also joined California Attorney General Bill Lockyer in seeking to void several settlements reached during the previous administration involving insurance companies and the California Research and Assistance Fund.

During his tenure, Low was involved in California's efforts to address unresolved Holocaust-era insurance claims, including the distribution of a $4.2 million payment from three Dutch insurers to a humanitarian fund for Holocaust survivors.

In September 2001, Low announced that he would not seek election to a full term as insurance commissioner. He remained in office through the end of the term in 2002.

== Personal life and dearh ==
Low was married to Mayling Low for approximately seven decades. They had three children: a daughter, Kathy, and two sons, Lawrence B. “Larry” Low and Allan E. Low. Both of his sons became attorneys.

Low died on December 9, 2021, aged 91. At the time of his death, legal and Chinese American community organizations remembered him for his judicial career, civic service, and role in expanding Asian American representation in the California legal profession.

== Legacy ==
Low was a pioneering Chinese American jurist in California. His 1966 appointment to the San Francisco Municipal Court made him the first judge of Chinese American ancestry in Northern California. He later became the first Chinese American to serve on the San Francisco Superior Court and the California Court of Appeal, First Appellate District.

Low's career extended beyond the judiciary. He served in several San Francisco civic positions, including as president of the San Francisco Police Commission, worked for more than two decades in alternative dispute resolution with JAMS, and later served as California Insurance Commissioner.

Low entered the judiciary at a time when Asian Americans were sparsely represented on California courts.His 1966 appointment made him the first judge of Chinese American ancestry in Northern California.In 1976, there were reported to be only 15 Asian Pacific Islander judges statewide, including two in San Francisco, one of whom was Low.

== See also ==
- Chinese Americans in San Francisco
- History of Chinese Americans
- List of Asian American jurists
- California Courts of Appeal
- California Department of Insurance
