= George R. Bliss =

American politician

Member of the California State Assembly from the 39th district
- In office January 2, 1933 – January 7, 1935
- Preceded by: Clifford Wixson
- Succeeded by: Alfred W. Robertson

Member of the California State Assembly from the 49th district
- In office January 5, 1931 – January 2, 1933
- Preceded by: Elbert G. Adams
- Succeeded by: Herbert Johnston Evans

Member of the California State Assembly from the 59th district
- In office January 7, 1929 – January 5, 1931
- Preceded by: T. R. Finley
- Succeeded by: Willard E. Badham

Personal details
- Born: September 4, 1883 Washington D.C., US
- Died: September 20, 1974 (aged 91) Los Angeles, California, US
- Party: Republican
- Spouse: Ruth Amelia Shorkley Bliss

Military service
- Branch/service: United States Army
- Battles/wars: World War I

George Ripley Bliss (September 4, 1883 – September 20, 1974) served in the California State Assembly for the 59th, 49th and 39th district from 1929 to 1935. During World War I he also served in the United States Army. Assemblyman also introduced a bill to legalize the segregation of Mexican children, which was later defeated due to the results of the Lemon Grove Incident.
