= 1994 California Insurance Commissioner election =

- November 8, 1994
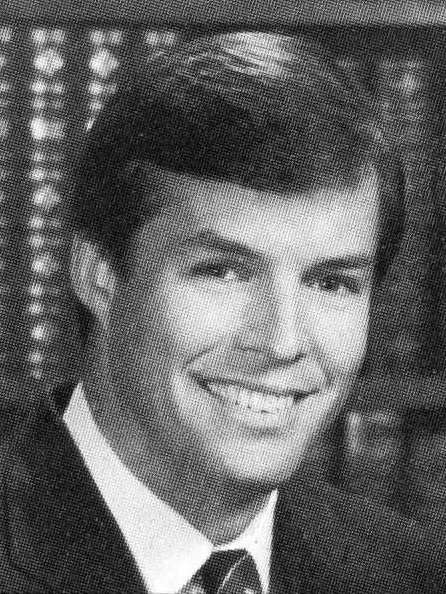

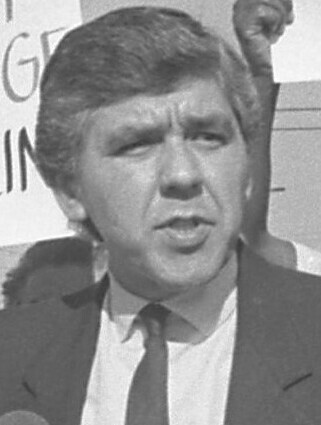
Nominee	Chuck Quackenbush	Art Torres
Party	Republican	Democratic
Popular vote	4,015,858	3,567,996
Percentage	48.82%	43.38%
- County results Quackenbush: 40–50% 50–60% 60–70% Torres: 40–50% 50–60% 60–70%
Ins. Comm. before election
John Garamendi
Democratic
Elected Ins. Comm.
Chuck Quackenbush
Republican

The 1994 California Insurance Commissioner election occurred on November 8, 1994. The primary elections took place on March 8, 1994. The Republican nominee, Chuck Quackenbush, narrowly defeated the Democratic nominee, State Senator Art Torres, for the office previously held by incumbent John Garamendi, who chose not to seek re-election in favor of running for governor.

== Primary results ==
Final results from the California Secretary of State

=== Democratic ===
California Insurance Commissioner Democratic primary, 1994
Candidate	Votes	%
Art Torres	935,764	46.22
Burt Margolin	687,624	33.96
John Kraft	401,261	19.82
Total votes	2,024,649	100.00

=== Republican ===
California Insurance Commissioner Republican primary, 1994
Candidate	Votes	%
Chuck Quackenbush	675,242	37.93
Wes Bannister	370,202	20.79
Jim Conran	341,869	19.20
Jack Harden	243,479	13.68
Jim Stieringer	97,157	5.46
Glen J. Dulac	52,500	2.95
Total votes	1,780,449	100.00

=== Others ===
California Insurance Commissioner primary, 1994 (Others)
Party	Candidate	Votes	%
Libertarian	Ted Brown	346,007	100.00
Peace and Freedom	Tom Condit	150,844	100.00
American Independent	A. Jacques	17,848	100.00

== Election results ==
Final results from the Secretary of State of California.

California Insurance Commissioner election, 1994
Party	Candidate	Votes	%
Republican	Chuck Quackenbush	4,015,858	48.82
Democratic	Art Torres	3,567,996	43.38
Libertarian	Ted Brown	346,007	4.21
Peace and Freedom	Tom Condit	150,844	1.83
American Independent	A. Jacques	144,782	1.76
Invalid or blank votes		676,149	7.59
Total votes		8,225,487	100.00
Turnout			46.98
Republican gain from Democratic			

=== Results by county ===
County	Quackenbush	Votes	Torres	Votes	Brown	Votes	Condit	Votes	Jacques	Votes
Glenn	69.37%	5,459	24.23%	1,907	3.20%	252	1.17%	92	2.02%	159
Sutter	66.70%	14,325	26.68%	5,730	3.55%	762	1.35%	290	1.72%	370
Inyo	65.10%	4,587	27.42%	1,932	3.38%	238	1.90%	134	2.20%	155
Colusa	65.08%	3,204	28.62%	1,409	3.35%	165	1.40%	69	1.54%	76
Shasta	63.97%	34,084	27.03%	14,401	4.41%	2,349	1.51%	804	3.09%	1,644
Kern	63.21%	92,392	29.26%	42,772	3.83%	5,603	1.40%	2,046	2.29%	3,349
Orange	62.98%	453,349	29.62%	213,223	4.39%	31,580	1.27%	9,141	1.74%	12,527
Tehama	61.99%	11,307	29.12%	5,311	4.71%	860	1.78%	324	2.41%	439
Tulare	61.58%	46,080	31.76%	23,768	3.51%	2,625	1.48%	1,106	1.67%	1,252
Madera	60.89%	15,781	31.60%	8,191	3.43%	889	1.89%	490	2.18%	566
Butte	59.85%	39,455	32.19%	21,222	4.09%	2,693	1.85%	1,219	2.02%	1,329
Placer	59.04%	42,967	32.65%	23,761	4.42%	3,216	2.06%	1,496	1.83%	1,330
San Luis Obispo	59.03%	49,252	32.43%	27,058	4.47%	3,728	2.22%	1,854	1.85%	1,541
El Dorado	58.62%	31,130	32.38%	17,198	4.79%	2,542	1.97%	1,044	2.24%	1,191
Yuba	58.61%	8,216	31.38%	4,398	4.47%	626	3.97%	326	5.49%	451
Nevada	58.57%	21,393	32.72%	11,949	4.82%	1,760	1.97%	720	1.92%	701
Mono	57.32%	1,903	32.62%	1,083	5.60%	186	2.29%	76	2.17%	72
Mariposa	56.97%	3,929	33.45%	2,307	3.97%	274	3.38%	233	2.23%	154
Riverside	56.81%	186,544	35.02%	115,007	4.28%	14,067	1.45%	4,775	2.43%	7,971
Kings	56.70%	12,523	36.35%	8,029	3.16%	697	1.94%	429	1.84%	407
San Diego	56.63%	396,350	34.52%	241,566	5.07%	35,486	1.62%	11,342	2.16%	15,122
Fresno	56.57%	98,244	36.79%	63,883	3.00%	5,211	2.22%	3,853	1.42%	2,463
Ventura	56.43%	117,105	36.00%	74,706	4.32%	8,967	1.46%	3,028	1.80%	3,730
Amador	56.21%	7,184	36.04%	4,606	4.09%	523	1.60%	204	2.07%	364
Modoc	56.12%	2,085	29.04%	1,079	6.78%	252	2.96%	110	5.09%	189
San Bernardino	55.87%	188,041	35.82%	120,550	4.44%	14,950	1.56%	5,262	2.30%	7,748
Del Norte	55.72%	4,074	34.55%	2,526	5.16%	377	2.07%	151	2.52%	184
Calaveras	55.67%	8,587	34.51%	5,323	5.07%	782	2.57%	397	2.17%	335
Merced	55.32%	21,124	36.11%	13,788	3.43%	1,308	3.50%	1,335	1.66%	632
Plumas	55.12%	4,557	35.21%	2,911	4.72%	390	2.37%	196	2.59%	214
San Joaquin	54.53%	66,775	38.77%	47,471	3.39%	4,147	1.57%	1,923	1.75%	2,140
Santa Barbara	54.42%	67,590	38.00%	47,194	4.03%	5,011	1.89%	2,349	1.65%	2,047
Tuolumne	54.34%	10,429	37.73%	7,242	4.03%	773	2.42%	465	1.48%	284
Lassen	52.72%	4,171	34.14%	2,701	6.62%	524	2.31%	183	4.20%	332
Sierra	52.44%	818	35.19%	549	6.09%	95	2.69%	42	3.59%	56
Siskiyou	51.30%	9,009	36.37%	6,388	6.58%	1,156	2.68%	471	3.07%	539
Stanislaus	50.44%	49,295	39.81%	38,902	3.23%	3,155	4.94%	4,827	1.59%	1,551
Trinity	50.29%	2,651	33.96%	1,790	7.68%	405	4.21%	222	3.85%	203
San Benito	48.45%	5,529	42.45%	4,844	4.53%	517	2.51%	287	2.06%	235
Sacramento	48.28%	166,795	43.59%	150,596	4.49%	15,509	1.78%	6,156	1.85%	6,398
Napa	48.00%	19,870	43.96%	18,199	4.15%	1,720	2.05%	848	1.83%	759
Monterey	47.87%	42,474	43.45%	38,551	4.29%	3,802	2.28%	2,019	2.11%	1,875
Humboldt	47.81%	21,982	41.97%	19,296	4.74%	2,179	3.82%	1,758	1.66%	764
Alpine	47.56%	302	36.22%	230	8.35%	53	4.25%	27	3.62%	23
Lake	46.68%	8,855	44.52%	8,445	4.91%	932	1.88%	357	2.00%	379
Santa Clara	45.30%	191,957	46.37%	196,525	4.53%	19,191	1.83%	7,758	1.97%	8,360
Solano	43.86%	41,928	47.31%	45,220	4.16%	3,980	1.94%	1,856	2.72%	2,602
Imperial	43.85%	10,265	46.41%	10,863	3.69%	864	4.17%	975	1.89%	442
Contra Costa	43.09%	119,755	49.70%	138,127	4.15%	11,545	1.67%	4,640	1.38%	3,833
Los Angeles	42.97%	848,443	50.21%	991,476	3.82%	75,415	1.53%	30,296	1.46%	28,870
Yolo	40.52%	19,208	51.38%	24,356	3.65%	1,728	6.79%	1,304	4.21%	808
San Mateo	40.36%	81,559	52.99%	107,090	3.72%	7,518	1.68%	3,386	1.26%	2,537
Sonoma	38.87%	59,352	51.80%	79,090	5.00%	7,637	2.76%	4,210	1.58%	2,408
Mendocino	38.52%	11,054	48.23%	13,842	6.69%	1,920	4.69%	1,345	1.88%	539
Santa Cruz	38.02%	32,846	51.23%	44,255	5.33%	4,602	3.78%	4,367	1.64%	1,421
Marin	36.17%	36,048	56.49%	56,299	4.50%	4,486	1.97%	1,965	0.86%	861
Alameda	29.74%	113,052	62.71%	238,353	3.80%	14,461	2.33%	8,863	1.41%	5,348
San Francisco	22.55%	48,615	68.90%	148,508	4.33%	9,324	3.02%	6,499	1.21%	2,603

== See also ==
- California state elections, 1994
- California Insurance Commissioner
