= Mike Eng =

American politician (born 1946)

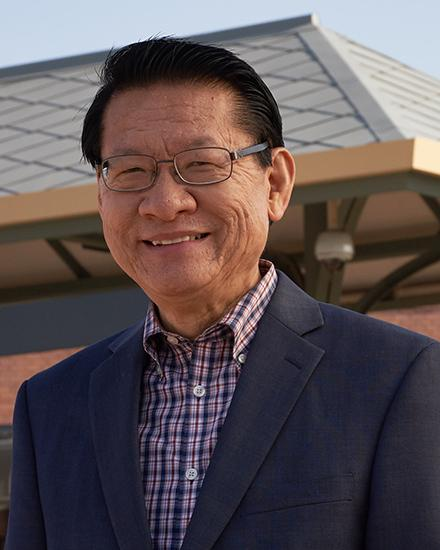

Member of the Board of Trustees of the Los Angeles Community College District
- In office March 2013 – June 2017

Member of the California State Assembly from the 49th district
- In office December 4, 2006 – November 30, 2012
- Preceded by: Judy Chu
- Succeeded by: Ed Chau

Mayor of Monterey Park
- In office August 21, 2004 – January 18, 2005
- Preceded by: Sharon Martinez
- Succeeded by: Frank Venti

Member of the Monterey Park City Council
- In office March 8, 2003 – December 4, 2006
- Preceded by: Judy Chu
- Succeeded by: Anthony Wong

Personal details
- Born: Michael Francis Eng; September 14, 1946 (age 80) Oakland, California, U.S.
- Party: Democratic
- Spouse: Judy Chu (m. 1978)
- Education: University of California, Los Angeles; University of Hawaiʻi
- Occupation: state board member lawyer academic professor

Michael Francis Eng (Chinese: 伍國慶; pinyin: Wǔ Guóqìng; born September 14, 1946) is an American politician serving as one of five members of the California Unemployment Insurance Appeals Board (CUIAB) since 2019. A member of the Democratic Party, he was appointed to the body, an administrative court system for workers and employers, ruling on work-related benefits, by State Assembly Speaker Anthony Rendon. Eng previously served in the Monterey Park City Council (2003–2006) and California State Assembly (2006–2012); he was Mayor of Monterey Park from 2004 to 2005. He was elected to the Los Angeles Community College District Board of Trustees in 2013 and served until 2017.

== Biography ==
In 2004, Eng became Mayor of Monterey Park, California, an office he held until 2005.

Eng has served as a City Councilman, State Assemblyman and Community College Board Vice President. He has also served as Vice Chair of the State Board of Acupuncture and President of the Monterey Park Library Board of Trustees. While in the Assembly, he chaired the Committee on Transportation, Committee on Business and Professions and Committee on Banking and Finance.

In 2018, he ran for the California State Senate, but was defeated in November by Baldwin Park City Councilwoman Susan Rubio.

He founded a downtown immigration law firm and has also been on the teaching faculty at California State University, Los Angeles, UCLA, Los Angeles Trade Tech College and University of the West.

== Personal life ==
In 2011, Mike Eng commented publicly on the name given to a food delivery service started by two UCLA students, "Ching-Chong-Ling-Long Gourmet Takeout". He stated, "Stereotypical phrases such as these perpetuate misunderstandings about Asian Americans and intensify hurtful sentiments toward this community". The delivery service in question was subsequently discontinued after pushback from Mike Eng and several UCLA student groups.

Eng is married to Congresswoman Judy Chu.
