= CalCare =

Proposed single-payer health care system in California

CalCare is a proposed single-payer health care system for the state of California. If passed and funded, California would be the first state to fully implement single-payer. Advocates argue it could serve as a test model to lend confidence for a national health system, whereas opponents cite potential budget shortfalls and a difficult transition to a government-run insurance system.

== History ==
The California Nurses Association has been sponsoring statewide single-payer health care bills for decades.

In his 2017 run for governor, Gavin Newsom campaigned with the California Nurses Association on his explicit support for passing single-payer in California. He has since abandoned his promise.

The first "CalCare" bill, AB 1400, officially known as the California Guaranteed Health Care for All Act, was introduced in 2021 by California State Representative Ash Kalra. The bill passed the Assembly Health and Appropriations Committees before the author pulled it from a full vote on the Assembly floor, claiming he did not believe it had enough votes to pass. The 2024 bill, AB 2200, was endorsed by 250 unions and organizations.

AB 2200 passed the Assembly Health Committee but was unilaterally blocked in the Assembly Appropriations Committee by Oakland Assembly member California State Representative Buffy Wicks. Buffy Wicks cosponsored the 2022 CalCare bill AB 1400 and in 2021 promised CalCare activist Ady Barkan that she would pass single-payer if given the opportunity.

On February 12, 2026, Kalra, with the sponsorship of the California Nurses Association, reintroduced AB 1900, the California Guaranteed Health Care for All Act. In April 2026, the bill failed to advance. Single-payer is a major issue in the 2026 California gubernatorial election with Democratic candidates Tom Steyer, Katie Porter, Xavier Becerra, and Tony Thurmond supporting CalCare.

== Support and opposition ==
=== Polling ===
A 2026 poll commissioned by the California Nurses Association found 86% of California Democrats and 58% of voters overall supported a single-payer system. Two-thirds of Californians agreed that "We need major reforms to our current health care system" as opposed to 19% supporting "minor reforms" and 9% for the system "as it is."

=== Support ===
The California Nurses Association strongly supports a single-payer system, campaigning on seven CalCare principles: universal coverage, a single public program, fully comprehensive benefits, freedom to choose your care provider, free at the point of service, a just transition (for displaced workers), and patient care based on patient need (not denying necessary care).

The California Labor Federation and the California Teachers Association supported CalCare in 2024.

Gavin Newsom claimed to support a single-payer system. In 2017, he said, "I’m tired of politicians saying they support single-payer but that it’s too soon, too expensive or someone else’s problem." The California Democratic Party has endorsed a single-payer system with universal coverage in their platform.

=== Opposition ===
The California Medical Association, the California Association of Health Plans, the California Hospital Association, and the California Chamber of Commerce opposed CalCare in 2022.

California State Assemblymember Buffy Wicks, chair of the California Assembly Appropriations Committee, opposed CalCare in 2024, stating "We have an obligation to balance the budget in California. There were some tough choices to make." If passed in 2024, the CalCare system would not have impacted the 2024-2025 budget, as it would not have been implemented until after the legislature had voted on the separate funding mechanism.

== See also ==
- Healthcare in California
- Healthcare reform in the United States
- Vermont health care reform
- New York Health Act
