= Diane Martinez =

American politician

Member of the California State Assembly from the 49th district
- In office December 7, 1992 – November 30, 1998
- Preceded by: Javier Becerra
- Succeeded by: Gloria Romero

Personal details
- Born: January 14, 1953 (age 73) Los Angeles, California
- Party: Democratic
- Spouse: Jon Elliott Mandaville (m. 1997)
- Children: 1
- Parent: Matthew G. Martinez (father)
- Education: Portland State University, East Los Angeles Community College

Diane Mary Martinez (born January 14, 1953) is an American politician who served in the California State Assembly for the 49th district from 1992 until 1998. She is a Democrat. A resident of Monterey Park, Her freshman class was the first elected under 1990 voter approved term limits. Martinez became the first freshman to chair a full standing committee, Elections Reapportionments and Constitutional Amendments. Her committee assignments included Appropriations, Education, Health, Local Government, Public Safety, and Utilities and Commerce.

Martinez was Chair of Utilities and Commerce. She also chaired the Select Committee on Insurance Fraud. Martinez was the only non attorney member of the Committee on the Judiciary.

Martinez was the original author of the "Pant Bill" which prohibited employers from terminating female employees for wearing pants to work. The bill was hijacked in the Senate, authors were switched, and Martinez became principal co-author of her own bill. Authorship was conceded to Senator Charles Calderon.

Martinez was the first member of the California State Assembly to marry on the Assembly Floor. She Married Dr. Jon Elliott Mandaville in 1997. They remained married until his death in 2019.

Martinez ran for state Insurance Commissioner in 1998. In the Democratic primary, she was nominated over Hal Brown Jr., a Marin County Supervisor and cousin of former California Governor Jerry Brown. Martinez lost the general election to the incumbent Republican, Chuck Quackenbush.

Martinez is the daughter of former Congressman Matthew G. Martinez.

Political offices
Preceded by Gwen Moore	California State Assemblywoman, 49th District; December 7, 1992 - November 30, 1998	Succeeded by Gloria Romero
Party political offices
Preceded by Art Torres	Democratic Nominee, Insurance Commissioner; 1998	Succeeded by John Garamendi
