= 1998 California Proposition 6 =

Law criminalizing the death of a horse, donkey or mule for human consumption

Proposition 6
- Prohibition on Slaughter of Horses and Sale of Horsemeat for Human Consumption.

Results
| Choice | Votes | % |
|---|---|---|
| Yes | 4,672,457 | 59.39% |
| No | 3,195,619 | 40.61% |
| Valid votes | 7,868,076 | 100.00% |
| Invalid or blank votes | 0 | 0.00% |
| Total votes | 7,868,076 | 100.00% |
For
60%–70%
50%–60%
Against
60%–70%
50%–60%

Proposition 6 was an initiative statute that appeared on the November 3, 1998 California general election ballot. It was passed with 4,670,524 Yes votes, for 59.4 percent of the total votes cast. The proposition added sections 598c and 598d to the California Penal Code, making it a felony for any person in the state to possess, transfer, receive, or hold a horse (defined to include ponies, donkeys and mules) with the intent to kill it, or have it killed, where the person knows, or should have known, that any part of the carcass will be used for human consumption. An additional provision makes it a misdemeanor to sell horse meat within the state as meat intended for human consumption. The law further allows for anyone previously convicted of selling horsemeat to be charged with a felony in any future prosecutions for the same offense. Only about one percent of California horses were previously slaughtered for horsemeat, primarily for export to markets in Belgium, France, Italy, and Japan. Horsemeat is rarely eaten by people in the United States.

== See also ==
- Animal law
