= Ed Chau =

American judge and politician (born 1957)

- 周本立
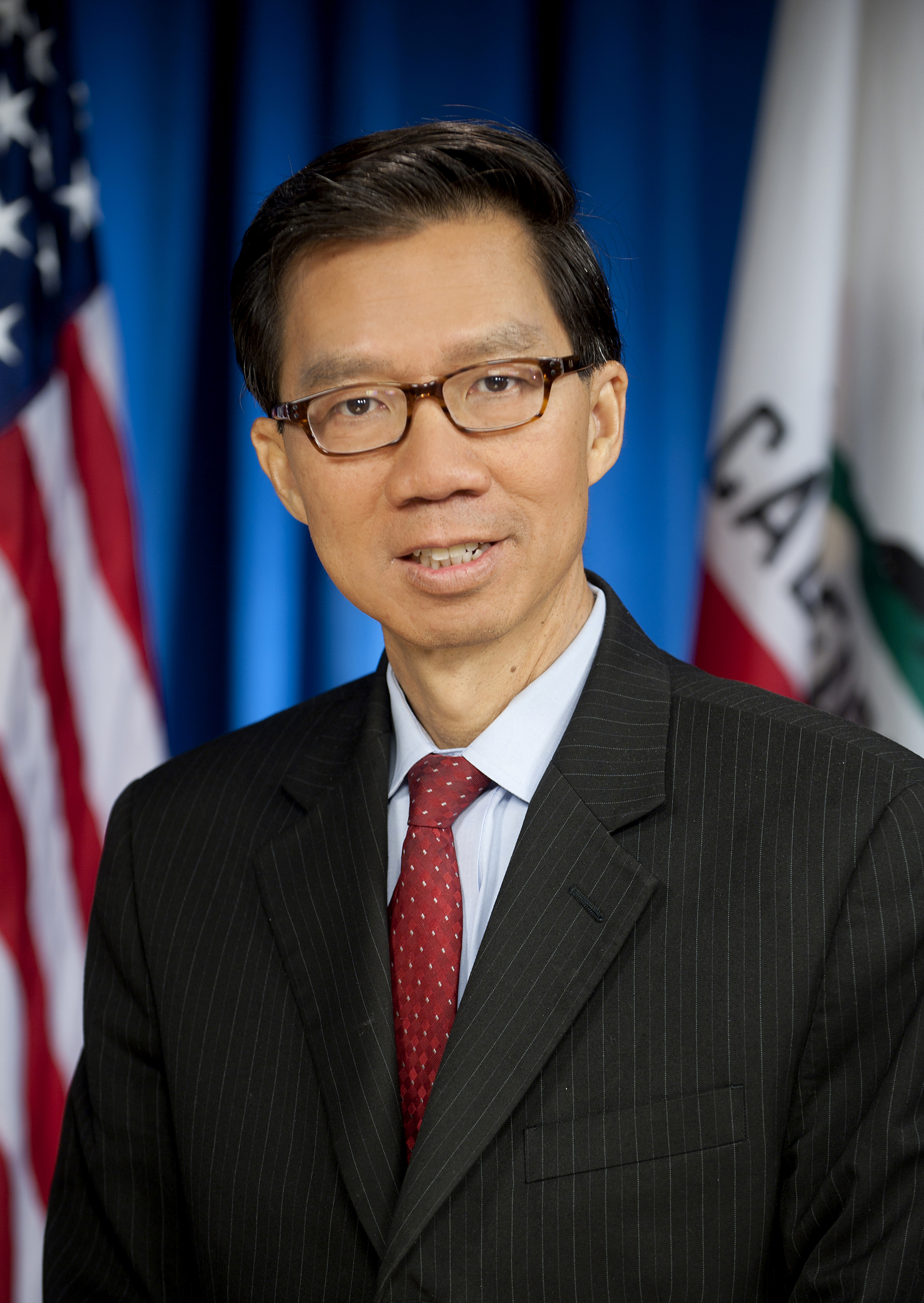

Judge of the Los Angeles County Superior Court
- Incumbent
- Assumed office December 11, 2021
- Appointed by: Gavin Newsom

Member of the California State Assembly from the 49th district
- In office December 3, 2012 – December 10, 2021
- Preceded by: Mike Eng
- Succeeded by: Mike Fong

Personal details
- Born: Edwin Pun Chau; September 17, 1957 (age 69) British Hong Kong
- Party: Democratic
- Spouse: Candice
- Education: University of Southern California (BA, BS); Southwestern University School of Law (JD)

Edwin Pun Chau (Note: Chinese: 周本立; Jyutping: Zau^{1} Bun^{2} Lap^{6}) (born September 17, 1957) is an American jurist and politician who served in the California State Assembly as a Democrat representing the 49th state assembly District from 2012 to 2021. On November 29, 2021, California Governor Gavin Newsom appointed Chau to be a judge in the Los Angeles County Superior Court.

== Early life and education ==
Chau was born in Hong Kong in 1957 and grew up in Los Angeles. He holds a B.A. in sociology and a B.S. in computer science from the University of Southern California. He also received a J.D. from Southwestern University School of Law.

== California State Assembly ==
In June, 2021, Chau was appointed by the Speaker of the Assembly to serve as the Assistant Majority Leader. Prior to the appointment, Chau served as the Chairman of the Assembly Committee on Privacy and Consumer Protection from 2016 to 2021. Previously, he was the Chairman of the Assembly Committee on Housing and Community Development. Chau also served as a member of the following standing committees: Appropriations, Judiciary, Jobs, Economic Development and the Economy, Natural Resources, and Privacy and Consumer Protection.

In addition, Chau was the Chairman of the Assembly Select Committee on Emerging Technologies and Innovation. As Chair, he had convened informational hearings on the Internet of Things (IoT), Artificial Intelligence, Facial Recognition Technology, 5-G Technology, and Mobile Applications, among others. He was also a member of the following Select Committees: Asia/California Trade and Investment Promotion, California's Clean Energy Economy, Cybersecurity, and Regional Transportation Solutions.

In 2018, Chau introduced and passed the landmark privacy law, alongside Senator Robert Hertzberg, the California Consumer Privacy Act of 2018 (CCPA), giving California consumers significant control over the collection, use and processing of their personal information. The law, considered the most comprehensive privacy law in the nation, has frequently been compared to the European Union landmark privacy law, the General Data Protection Regulation (GDPR).

In addition, Chau passed a law that would require data brokers to publicly register with the Attorney General's office, providing Californians transparent information about who is collecting their personal information. Other laws passed by Chau include prohibiting the sale, purchase and use of hacked data; making it a crime to assist in soliciting another to commit hacking; requiring credit reporting agencies to fix vulnerabilities regarding data breaches; protecting individuals' privacy from devices like drones; authorizing the California Military Department to conduct cybersecurity assessments in schools; requiring disclosure of a data breach to California residents when the encryption key is lost; and authorizing local governments to provide broadband services, while adhering to “net neutrality rules”. Chau also introduced legislation to safeguard personal data collected by digital health trackers. as well as address biases in the use of automated artificial intelligence systems.

Moreover, Chau passed laws to help curb climate change; protect water resources through groundwater cleanup funding; combat wild fires through forest management; protect seniors against elder abuse; require Emergency Medical Technicians (EMTs) to receive training on how to interact with dementia patients and their caregivers; mandate advance notice before increasing life insurance costs on consumers; ensure that students in California receive instruction on the Chinese Exclusion Act of 1882 and the contributions made by Chinese Americans in establishing the Transcontinental Railroad; protect students by removing from classrooms teachers charged with a sex offense; safeguard children from cyber sexual bullying; prohibit the online marketing of cannabis products or services to minors; and legally protect Good Samaritans that break into hot vehicles to rescue children.

Chau also passed a number of legislative measures to address the housing crisis; assist with language access in hospital settings and the language accessibility needs of voters; and to help small business owners facing frivolous lawsuits.

== Electoral history ==
=== 2012 California State Assembly ===
California's 49th State Assembly district election, 2012
Primary election
Party	Candidate	Votes	%
Republican	Matthew Lin	20,549	52.2
Democratic	Ed Chau	13,746	34.9
Democratic	Mitchell Ing	5,074	12.9
Total votes		39,369	100.0
General election
Democratic	Ed Chau	64,791	56.4
Republican	Matthew Lin	50,153	43.6
Total votes		114,944	100.0
Democratic hold			

=== 2014 California State Assembly ===
California's 49th State Assembly district election, 2014
Primary election
Party	Candidate	Votes	%
Democratic	Ed Chau (incumbent)	17,540	60.2
Republican	Esthela Torres Siegrist	11,576	39.8
Total votes		29,116	100.0
General election
Democratic	Ed Chau (incumbent)	33,030	61.5
Republican	Esthela Torres Siegrist	20,678	38.5
Total votes		53,708	100.0
Democratic hold			

=== 2016 California State Assembly ===
California's 49th State Assembly district election, 2016
Primary election
Party	Candidate	Votes	%
Democratic	Ed Chau (incumbent)	44,922	99.5
Republican	Peter Amundson, Jr. (write-in)	188	0.4
Libertarian	Matthew "Boomer" Shannon (write-in)	25	0.1
Total votes		45,135	100.0
General election
Democratic	Ed Chau (incumbent)	82,964	70.0
Republican	Peter Amundson, Jr. (write-in)	35,533	30.0
Total votes		118,497	100.0
Democratic hold			

=== 2018 California State Assembly ===
California's 49th State Assembly district election, 2018
Primary election
Party	Candidate	Votes	%
Democratic	Ed Chau (incumbent)	35,365	69.0
Republican	Burton Brink	15,910	31.0
Total votes		46,349	100.0
General election
Democratic	Ed Chau (incumbent)	75,421	71.2
Republican	Burton Brink	30,506	28.8
Total votes		105,927	100.0
Democratic hold			

=== 2020 California State Assembly ===
2020 California's 49th State Assembly district election
Primary election
Party	Candidate	Votes	%
Democratic	Ed Chau (incumbent)	36,985	52.0%
Republican	Burton Brink	17,531	24.6%
Democratic	Bryan Mesinas Pérez	9,006	12.7%
Democratic	Priscilla Silva	7,628	10.7%
Total votes		71,150	100%
General election
Democratic	Ed Chau (incumbent)	80,751	68.1
Republican	Burton Brink	37,867	31.9
Total votes		118,618	100.0
Democratic hold			

== See also ==
- List of Asian American jurists
