= Insurance Continuing Education =

Insurance Continuing Education are requirements for insurance agents in the United States to maintain their ability to sell different types of insurance products after getting licensed by the state department of insurance (DOI).

There is no nationwide accreditation since insurance agents are licensed by individual states. CFP, CPA, and CLU/ChFC (PACE) are an exception since these designations are administered by a national board.

Insurance continuing education, CFP, CPA and CLU/ChFC usually have a set credit hour requirement for a period of year(s), sometimes with specific hour requirements for special topics including but not limited to ethics, long term care and other topics.

Since late 1990s, all states allow insurance continuing education classes to be taken on-line. Often, a portion of the requirements may be satisfied through reading and other self-study as well.

The number of credit hours of study required to get insurance licenses renewed vary from state to state. All online courses are prepared based on the credit hour requirements set by the state's department of insurance. Only those courses that are approved are accepted towards fulfilling the state requirements of insurance continuing education .

== See also ==
- Continuing professional development
