= California's 49th State Assembly district =

American legislative district

Current assemblymember
Mike Fong; D–Alhambra
- Population (2010) • Voting age • Citizen voting age: 462,545; 362,747; 275,312
- Demographics: 12.50% White; 0.86% Black; 32.47% Latino; 53.36% Asian; 0.19% Native American; 0.07% Hawaiian/Pacific Islander; 0.13% other; 0.41% remainder of multiracial
- Registered voters: 208,109
- Registration: 43.9% Democratic; 18.69% Republican; 32.31% No party preference

California's 49th State Assembly district is one of 80 California State Assembly districts. It is currently represented by Democrat Mike Fong of Alhambra.

== District profile ==
The district encompasses the western San Gabriel Valley, with its western side abutting Los Angeles city limits.

Los Angeles County – 4.7%

- Alhambra
- Arcadia
- El Monte – 62.1%
- Montebello – 10.3%
- Monterey Park
- Rosemead
- San Gabriel
- San Marino
- South El Monte – 27.4%
- South Pasadena
- Temple City

== Election results from statewide races ==
Year	Office	Results
2020	President	Biden 64.3 - 31.8%
2018	Governor	Newsom 64.8 – 35.2%
2018	Senator	Feinstein 59.7 – 40.4%
2016	President	Clinton 67.6 – 27.2%
2016	Senator	Harris 55.8 – 44.2%
2014	Governor	Brown 63.2 – 36.8%
2012	President	Obama 64.7 – 33.3%
2012	Senator	Feinstein 67.9 – 32.1%

== List of assembly members representing the district ==
Due to redistricting, the 49th district has been moved around different parts of the state. The current iteration resulted from the 2021 redistricting by the California Citizens Redistricting Commission.

Assembly members	Party	Years served	Counties represented	Notes
James V. Coleman	Democratic	January 5, 1885 – January 3, 1887	San Mateo	
William Zathariar Price	Republican	January 3, 1887 – January 7, 1889	San Mateo	
L. J. Franks	Democratic	January 7, 1889 – January 5, 1891	San Mateo	
Alexander Gordon	Republican	January 5, 1891 – January 2, 1893	San Mateo	
Herschel Benoni Masilon Miller	Republican	January 2, 1893 – January 7, 1895	Alameda	
J. B. McDonald	Democratic	January 7, 1895 – March 1, 1895	Alameda	Lost the election recount.
H. M. Collins	Republican	March 1, 1895 – March 26, 1896	Alameda	Won election recount. Died in office.
Oscar F. Breiling	Republican	January 4, 1897 – January 2, 1899	Alameda	
A. A. McKeen	Republican	January 2, 1899 – January 1, 1901	Alameda	
David F. McWade	Republican	January 1, 1901 – January 5, 1903	Alameda	
John Weber Mott	Republican	January 5, 1903 – January 2, 1905	Alameda	
John Joseph Burke	Republican	January 2, 1905 – January 4, 1909	Alameda	
John Weber Mott	Republican	January 4, 1909 – January 2, 1911	Alameda	
George Fitzgearld	Republican	January 2, 1911 – January 6, 1913	Alameda	
John Joseph Griffin	Democratic	January 6, 1913 – January 4, 1915	Merced, Madera	
Edward Stanton Ellis	Democratic	January 4, 1915 – January 8, 1917	Merced, Madera	
Dr. Adam Lorentius Christian Hjalmar Kylberg	Republican	January 8, 1917 – January 6, 1919	Merced, Madera	
Guy Windrem	Democratic	January 6, 1919 – January 8, 1923	Merced, Madera	
David Caledffwd Williams	Republican	January 8, 1923 – January 5, 1925	Merced, Madera	
Elbert G. Adams	Democratic	January 5, 1925 – January 5, 1931	Merced, Madera	
George R. Bliss	Republican	January 5, 1931 – January 2, 1933	Santa Barbara	
Herbert Johnston Evans	Republican	January 2, 1933 – January 4, 1937	Los Angeles	
Frank L. Baynham	Democratic	January 4, 1937 – January 2, 1939	Los Angeles	
Lee T. Bashore	Republican	January 2, 1939 – September 14, 1944	Los Angeles	Died in office from an illness.
Ernest R. Geddes	Republican	January 8, 1945 – January 2, 1961	Los Angeles	Won as a write-in candidate.
Houston I. Flournoy	Republican	January 2, 1961 – January 2, 1967	Los Angeles	
Peter F. Schabarum	Republican	January 2, 1967 – March 6, 1972	Los Angeles	Resigned from office.
Vacant		March 6, 1972 – June 19, 1972	Los Angeles	
William H. Lancaster	Republican	June 19, 1972 – November 30, 1974	Los Angeles	Sworn in after winning special to fill vacant seat left by Schabarum.
Julian Dixon	Democratic	December 2, 1974 – November 30, 1978	Los Angeles	
Gwen Moore	Democratic	December 4, 1978 – November 30, 1992	Los Angeles	
Diane Martinez	Democratic	December 7, 1992 – November 30, 1998	Los Angeles	
Gloria Romero	Democratic	December 7, 1998 – March 12, 2001	Los Angeles	Resigned from the California State Assembly to be sworn in after winning a seat in the 24th State Senate district.
Vacant		March 12, 2001 – May 21, 2001	Los Angeles	
Judy Chu	Democratic	May 21, 2001 – November 30, 2006	Los Angeles	Sworn in after winning special election.
Mike Eng	Democratic	December 4, 2006 – November 30, 2012	Los Angeles	
Ed Chau	Democratic	December 3, 2012 – December 10, 2021	Los Angeles	Appointed judge in the Los Angeles County Superior Court.
Vacant		December 10, 2021 – February 22, 2022	Los Angeles	
Mike Fong	Democratic	February 22, 2022 – present	Los Angeles	Sworn in after winning special election.

== Election results (1990–present) ==
=== 2024 ===
2024 California State Assembly 49th district election
Primary election
Party	Candidate	Votes	%
Democratic	Mike Fong (incumbent)	42,164	64.0
Republican	David Liu	23,678	36.0
Total votes		65,842	100.0
General election
Democratic	Mike Fong (incumbent)	92,514	62.0
Republican	David Liu	56,795	38.0
Total votes		149,309	100.0
Democratic hold			

=== 2022 ===
2022 California State Assembly 49th district election
Primary election
Party	Candidate	Votes	%
Democratic	Mike Fong (incumbent)	42,929	70.2
Republican	Burton Brink	18,259	29.8
Total votes		61,188	100.0
General election
Democratic	Mike Fong (incumbent)	65,965	66.6
Republican	Burton Brink	33,024	33.4
Total votes		98,989	100.0
Democratic hold			

=== 2022 (special) ===
2022 California State Assembly 49th district special election Vacancy resulting from the resignation of Ed Chau
Primary election
Party	Candidate	Votes	%
Democratic	Mike Fong	27,763	67.0
Republican	Burton Brink	13,703	33.0
Total votes		41,466	100.0
Democratic hold			

=== 2020 ===
2020 California State Assembly 49th district election
Primary election
Party	Candidate	Votes	%
Democratic	Ed Chau (incumbent)	36,985	52.0
Republican	Burton Brink	17,531	24.6
Democratic	Bryan Mesinas Peréz	9,006	12.7
Democratic	Prscilla Silva	7,628	10.7
Total votes		71,150	100.0
General election
Democratic	Ed Chau (incumbent)	107,976	67.9
Republican	Burton Brink	50,988	32.1
Total votes		158,964	100.0
Democratic hold			

=== 2018 ===
2018 California State Assembly 49th district election
Primary election
Party	Candidate	Votes	%
Democratic	Ed Chau (incumbent)	35,365	69.0
Republican	Burton Brink	15,910	31.0
Total votes		46,349	100.0
General election
Democratic	Ed Chau (incumbent)	75,421	71.2
Republican	Burton Brink	30,506	28.8
Total votes		105,927	100.0
Democratic hold			

=== 2016 ===
2016 California State Assembly 49th district election
Primary election
Party	Candidate	Votes	%
Democratic	Ed Chau (incumbent)	44,922	99.5
Republican	Peter Amundson, Jr. (write-in)	188	0.4
Libertarian	Matthew "Boomer" Shannon (write-in)	25	0.1
Total votes		45,135	100.0
General election
Democratic	Ed Chau (incumbent)	82,964	70.0
Republican	Peter Amundson, Jr.	35,533	30.0
Total votes		118,497	100.0
Democratic hold			

=== 2014 ===
2014 California State Assembly 49th district election
Primary election
Party	Candidate	Votes	%
Democratic	Ed Chau (incumbent)	17,540	60.2
Republican	Esthela Torres Siegrist	11,576	39.8
Total votes		29,116	100.0
General election
Democratic	Ed Chau (incumbent)	33,030	61.5
Republican	Esthela Torres Siegrist	20,678	38.5
Total votes		53,708	100.0
Democratic hold			

=== 2012 ===
2012 California State Assembly 49th district election
Primary election
Party	Candidate	Votes	%
Republican	Matthew Lin	20,549	52.2
Democratic	Ed Chau	13,746	34.9
Democratic	Mitchell Ing	5,074	12.9
Total votes		39,369	100.0
General election
Democratic	Ed Chau	64,791	56.4
Republican	Matthew Lin	50,153	43.6
Total votes		114,944	100.0
Democratic hold			

=== 2010 ===
2010 California State Assembly 49th district election
Party	Candidate	Votes	%
Democratic	Mike Eng (incumbent)	46,841	68.9
Republican	Brad Jonathan Taylor	21,148	31.1
Total votes		67,989	100.0
Democratic hold			

=== 2008 ===
2008 California State Assembly 49th district election
Party	Candidate	Votes	%
Democratic	Mike Eng (incumbent)	62,418	67.2
Republican	Esthela Siegrist	30,511	32.8
Total votes		92,929	100.0
Democratic hold			

=== 2006 ===
2006 California State Assembly 49th district election
Party	Candidate	Votes	%
Democratic	Mike Eng	39,326	63.3
Republican	Esthela G. Siegrist	18,021	28.9
Libertarian	Laura Brown	4,865	7.8
Total votes		62,212	100.0
Democratic hold			

=== 2004 ===
2004 California State Assembly 49th district election
Party	Candidate	Votes	%
Democratic	Judy Chu (incumbent)	62,075	65.8
Republican	Sandra L. Needs	23,927	25.4
Libertarian	Laura Brown	8,363	8.8
Total votes		94,365	100.0
Democratic hold			

=== 2002 ===
2002 California State Assembly 49th district election
Party	Candidate	Votes	%
Democratic	Judy Chu (incumbent)	37,680	67.2
Republican	George C. Shen	18,461	32.8
Total votes		56,141	100.0
Democratic hold			

=== 2001 (special) ===
2001 California State Assembly 49th district special election Vacancy resulting from the resignation of Gloria Romero
Party	Candidate	Votes	%
Democratic	Judy Chu	12,101	58.5
Democratic	Daniel Arguello	6,958	33.7
Democratic	Robert Miranda	1,097	5.3
Libertarian	Kim J. Goldsworthy	514	2.5
Total votes		20,670	100.0
Democratic hold			

=== 2000 ===
2000 California State Assembly 49th district election
Party	Candidate	Votes	%
Democratic	Gloria Romero (incumbent)	62,015	100.0
Total votes		62,015	100.0
Democratic hold			

=== 1998 ===
1998 California State Assembly 49th district election
Party	Candidate	Votes	%
Democratic	Gloria Romero	43,800	71.2
Republican	Jay T. Imperial	16,066	26.1
Libertarian	Rachel Brown	1,634	2.7
Total votes		61,500	100.0
Democratic hold			

=== 1996 ===
1996 California State Assembly 49th district election
Party	Candidate	Votes	%
Democratic	Diane Martinez (incumbent)	49,804	69.2
Republican	Jay T. Imperial	22,120	30.8
Total votes		71,924	100.0
Democratic hold			

=== 1994 ===
1994 California State Assembly 49th district election
Party	Candidate	Votes	%
Democratic	Diane Martinez (incumbent)	40,315	66.6
Republican	George H. Nirschl III	17,825	29.5
Libertarian	Kim Goldsworthy	2,357	3.9
Total votes		60,497	100.0
Democratic hold			

=== 1992 ===
1992 California State Assembly 49th district election
Party	Candidate	Votes	%
Democratic	Diane Martinez	43,820	55.5
Republican	Sophie C. Wong	32,258	40.8
Libertarian	Kim Goldsworthy	2,917	3.7
Total votes		78,995	100.0
Democratic hold			

=== 1990 ===
1990 California State Assembly 49th district election
Party	Candidate	Votes	%
Democratic	Gwen Moore (incumbent)	54,518	72.9
Republican	Eric Givens	16,396	21.9
Peace and Freedom	Alice Mae Miles	2,133	2.9
Libertarian	Carin Rogers	1,748	2.3
Total votes		74,795	100.0
Democratic hold			

== See also ==
- California State Assembly
- California State Assembly districts
- Districts in California
