= Mike Fong =

American politician (b. 1976)

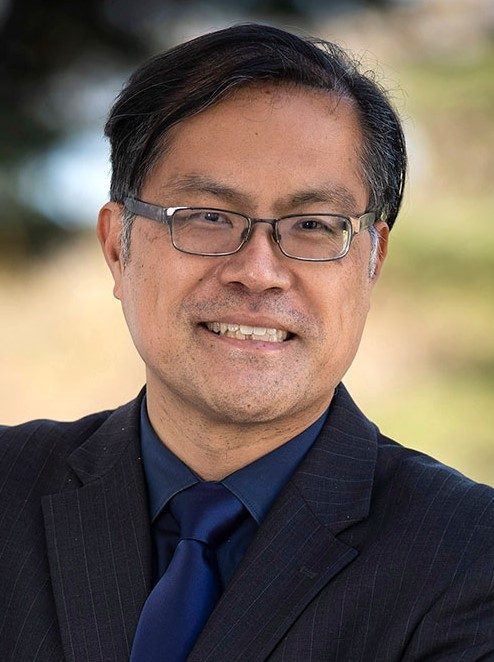
- Official portrait, 2022

Member of the California State Assembly from the 49th district
- Incumbent
- Assumed office February 22, 2022
- Preceded by: Ed Chau

Personal details
- Born: February 29, 1976 (age 50) Los Angeles, California
- Party: Democratic
- Education: University of California, Los Angeles (BS); California State University, Northridge (MPA)

Mike Fong (Chinese: 方樹強; pinyin: Fāng Shùqiáng, born February 29, 1976) is an American politician serving in the California State Assembly from the 49th district, which includes parts of the San Gabriel Valley, including El Monte, Monterey Park, Alhambra, and San Gabriel. He was elected in a 2022 special election to replace Ed Chau, who resigned after being nominated to the Los Angeles County Superior Court.

== Early life and education ==
Fong graduated from Francisco Bravo Medical Magnet High School and attended East Los Angeles College. He holds a Bachelor of Science in Psychobiology from the University of California, Los Angeles and a Master of Public Administration from California State University, Northridge.

== Career ==
Prior to his election to the California State Assembly, he served in various positions in Los Angeles County, including as a deputy mayor, a councilman's aide, and as a member of the Los Angeles Community College District Board of Trustees.

He was sworn in on February 22, 2022.

== Electoral history ==
2022 California State Assembly 49th district special election Vacancy resulting from the resignation of Ed Chau
Primary election
Party	Candidate	Votes	%
Democratic	Mike Fong	27,763	67.0
Republican	Burton Brink	13,703	33.0
Total votes		41,466	100.0
Democratic hold			

2022 California State Assembly 49th district election
Primary election
Party	Candidate	Votes	%
Democratic	Mike Fong (incumbent)	42,929	70.2
Republican	Burton Brink	18,259	29.8
Total votes		61,188	100.0
General election
Democratic	Mike Fong (incumbent)	65,965	66.6
Republican	Burton Brink	33,024	33.4
Total votes		98,989	100.0
Democratic hold			

2024 California State Assembly 49th district election
Primary election
Party	Candidate	Votes	%
Democratic	Mike Fong (incumbent)	42,164	64.0
Republican	David Liu	23,678	36.0
Total votes		65,842	100.0
General election
Democratic	Mike Fong (incumbent)	92,514	62.0
Republican	David Liu	56,795	38.0
Total votes		149,309	100.0
Democratic hold			
