= J. Clark Kelso =

American professor (born 1959)

California Insurance Commissioner
- In office July 10, 2000 – September 17, 2000
- Preceded by: Chuck Quackenbush
- Succeeded by: Harry W. Low

Personal details
- Born: 1959 (age 66–67)

J. Clark Kelso (born 1959) is an American professor who served briefly as Acting Insurance Commissioner of California in 2000, following the resignation of Chuck Quackenbush, and is currently Professor of Law at the McGeorge School of Law and federal receiver with responsibility for prison health care.

He graduated BA from the University of Illinois in 1980 and JD from Columbia University in 1983.

Kelso was clerk to Justice Anthony M. Kennedy of the United States Court of Appeals, Ninth Circuit District, before Kennedy was appointed to the Supreme Court, and later worked closely with the California Senate and Assembly to reform the California judiciary and improve the administration of justice. He was Scholar-in-Residence at the California Administrative Office of the Courts and in 1998 received the California Judicial Council's Bernard E. Witkin Amicus Curiae award.

After serving as Acting Insurance Commissioner of California in 2000, in May 2002 he was chosen by Governor Gray Davis as the State's Chief Information Officer and continued in that position in the administration of Arnold Schwarzenegger. In 2004 he was named by Government Technology in a list of the twenty-five Top Chief Information Officers in the public sector.

In 2009 he was appointed as federal receiver for prison health care.

== Selected publications ==
- J. Clark Kelso, A Dialogue about legal education as it approaches the 21st century (American Bar Association, 1987)
- J. Clark Kelso, A Report on the California Appellate System (1994)
- J. Clark Kelso, Unfair Trade Practices Litigation (Michie Co., 1995)
- J. Clark Kelso, Studying law: an introduction to legal research (Lexis, 1999)
- J. Clark Kelso & Kari C. Kelso, An analysis of punitive damages in California courts, 1991-2000 (Capital Center for Government Law and Policy, University of the Pacific, 2001)

== Notes ==
Political offices
Preceded by Chuck Quackenbush	California Insurance Commissioner; 2000	Succeeded by Harry W. Low
