= Lee T. Bashore =

American politician

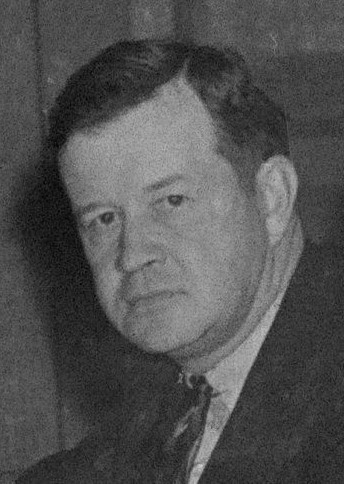
- Bashore in 1940

Member of the California State Assembly from the 49th district
- In office January 2, 1939 - September 14, 1944
- Preceded by: Frank L. Baynham
- Succeeded by: Ernest R. Geddes

Personal details
- Born: June 7, 1898 Covina, California
- Died: September 14, 1944 (aged 46) St. Louis, Missouri
- Party: Republican
- Children: 2

Military service
- Branch/service: United States Army
- Battles/wars: World War I

Lee T. Bashore (June 7, 1898 – September 14, 1944) was a United States Republican politician, who served in the California State Assembly for the 49th district from 1939 to 1944.

Bashore served in the United States Army during World War I. He was elected in 1934 and died shortly before the 1944 election, too late for his name to be removed from the ballot paper.
