= Chuck Quackenbush =

American politician

Charles Quackenbush
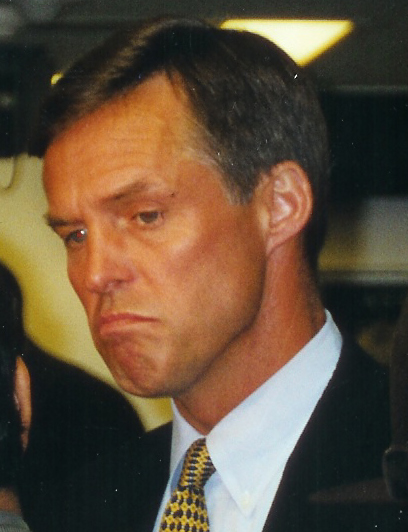

2nd California Insurance Commissioner
- In office January 2, 1995 – July 10, 2000
- Governor: Pete Wilson; Gray Davis
- Preceded by: John Garamendi
- Succeeded by: J. Clark Kelso

Member of the California State Assembly from the 24th district
- In office December 7, 1992 – November 30, 1994
- Preceded by: Dominic L. Cortese
- Succeeded by: Jim Cunneen

Member of the California State Assembly from the 22nd district
- In office December 1, 1986 – November 30, 1992
- Preceded by: Ernest L. Konnyu
- Succeeded by: John Vasconcellos

Personal details
- Born: Charles Quackenbush; April 20, 1954 (age 72) Tacoma, Washington, U.S.
- Party: Republican
- Spouse: Chris Quackenbush
- Children: 3
- Education: University of Notre Dame

Military service
- Allegiance: United States
- Branch/service: United States Army
- Years of service: 1976–1982
- Rank: Captain

Charles Quackenbush (born April 20, 1954) is an American former politician and Florida law enforcement officer. A Republican, he served as Insurance Commissioner of California from 1995 to 2000 and as a California State Assemblyman representing the 22nd District, from 1986 to 1994.

== Background and political career ==
Quackenbush was born on April 20, 1954, in Tacoma, Washington. As a child, he grew up in a military family and after graduating University of Notre Dame on a full ROTC scholarship, he joined the United States Army and rose to the rank of Captain as a helicopter pilot. In 1982, he left the military to join the family business in Silicon Valley. He was elected as a Republican to the California Assembly in 1986.

In 1994 he was elected insurance commissioner, effectively applying considerable campaign contributions from various insurance companies. He won re-election in 1998.

== Resignation ==
In early 2000, Cindy Ossias, then a senior lawyer for the California Department of Insurance (CDI), charged the Department with corruption.

After the 1994 Northridge earthquake, it was alleged that Quackenbush allowed insurance companies to compensate their clients much less than the actual damages. In exchange, the insurance companies set up special "educational funds". Those funds were used to create television commercials in which Quackenbush appeared as a basketball referee with Shaquille O'Neal in a Los Angeles Lakers uniform. While couched as public service announcements, suspicions rose that main idea behind the commercials was to increase Quackenbush's name identification, which is critical for electoral success in California statewide races. In addition to the educational funds, those same insurance companies contributed to his wife's unsuccessful 1998 assembly campaign, as well as his children's football camps.

On June 28, 2000, Quackenbush announced his resignation (to become effective on July 10).

In February 2002, an 18-month investigation conducted by federal, state and Sacramento County prosecutors ended with prosecutors declining to press charges against Quackenbush, as they felt the evidence was not strong enough.

== Life after insurance commissioner ==
After resigning as California's insurance commissioner, Quackenbush moved to Hawaii, where he was "doing political and military intelligence consulting". Quackenbush then moved to Florida and in 2005 became a sheriff's deputy in Lee County, Florida.

In 2007 he was suspended for accepting free food. While working as a sheriff's deputy in February 2008, Quackenbush shot and critically wounded a suspect who was reported as resisting arrest. He was placed on paid leave during the investigation of the shooting, a standard practice for the agency.

In September 2016, he resigned after making several Facebook postings that were described as "extremely racist." At the time of this resignation, he also served as the vice-chair of the Lee County Republican Executive Committee.

Political offices
Preceded by Ernie Konnyu	Member of the California State Assembly from the 22nd district 1986–1992	Succeeded by John Vasconcellos
Preceded by John Garamendi	California Insurance Commissioner; 1995–2000	Succeeded by J. Clark Kelso
