= California Insurance Commissioner =

Elected executive office position in California

Insurance Commissioner of California
- Great Seal of the State of California

- State flag

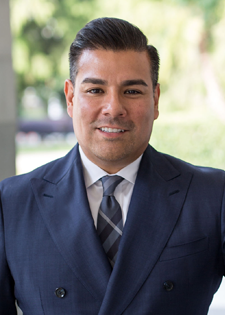
- Incumbent; Ricardo Lara since January 7, 2019
- Government of California; Department of Insurance
- Style: The Honorable
- Term length: Four years, two term limit
- Inaugural holder: John Garamendi; 1991
- Formation: Proposition 103
- Succession: Ninth
- Website: www.insurance.ca.gov

The California insurance commissioner has been an elected executive office position in California since 1991. Prior to that time, the insurance commissioner was appointed by the governor. The officeholder is in charge of the California Department of Insurance.

The current insurance commissioner is Democrat Ricardo Lara who will term-limit out in 2027. The next commissioner is Jane Kim who will take office on January 4, 2027.

== Duties ==
The duties of the Insurance Commissioner include the following responsibilities:

- Oversees and directs all functions of the Department of Insurance.
- Licenses, regulates, and examines insurance companies.
- Answers public questions and complaints regarding the insurance industry.
- Enforces the laws of the California Insurance Code and adopts regulations to implement the laws.
- The mission is to ensure vibrant markets where insurers keep their promises and the health and economic security of individuals, families, and businesses are protected.

== Office ==
As a result of the passage of Proposition 103 in 1988, the elected office of the California Insurance Commissioner was created in 1991. Previously, the position was held by a person appointed by the Governor. The Insurance Commissioner oversees the Department of Insurance.

The Insurance Commissioner does not oversee the majority of Health Plans and Health Insurance. HMO Health Plans and PPO Plans offered by Anthem Blue Cross and Blue Shield of California are overseen by the California Department of Managed Health Care.

Outside groups spent more than $6 million on the 2026 California insurance commissioner race, the highest amount ever recorded for the position, according to CalMatters.

Name	Term	Party
John Garamendi	January 7, 1991 – January 2, 1995	Democratic
Chuck Quackenbush	January 2, 1995 – July 10, 2000	Republican
J. Clark Kelso	July 10, 2000 – September 17, 2000	Republican
Harry W. Low	September 18, 2000 – January 6, 2003	Democratic
John Garamendi	January 6, 2003 – January 8, 2007	Democratic
Steve Poizner	January 8, 2007 – January 3, 2011	Republican
Dave Jones	January 3, 2011–January 7, 2019	Democratic
Ricardo Lara	January 7, 2019 – January 4, 2027	Democratic
Jane Kim	January 4, 2027	Democratic

== Elections ==
- 1990 California Insurance Commissioner election
- 1994 California Insurance Commissioner election
- 1998 California Insurance Commissioner election
- 2002 California Insurance Commissioner election
- 2006 California Insurance Commissioner election
- 2010 California Insurance Commissioner election
- 2014 California Insurance Commissioner election
- 2018 California Insurance Commissioner election
- 2022 California Insurance Commissioner election
- 2026 California Insurance Commissioner election
