= California Department of Insurance =

Government agency in California, US

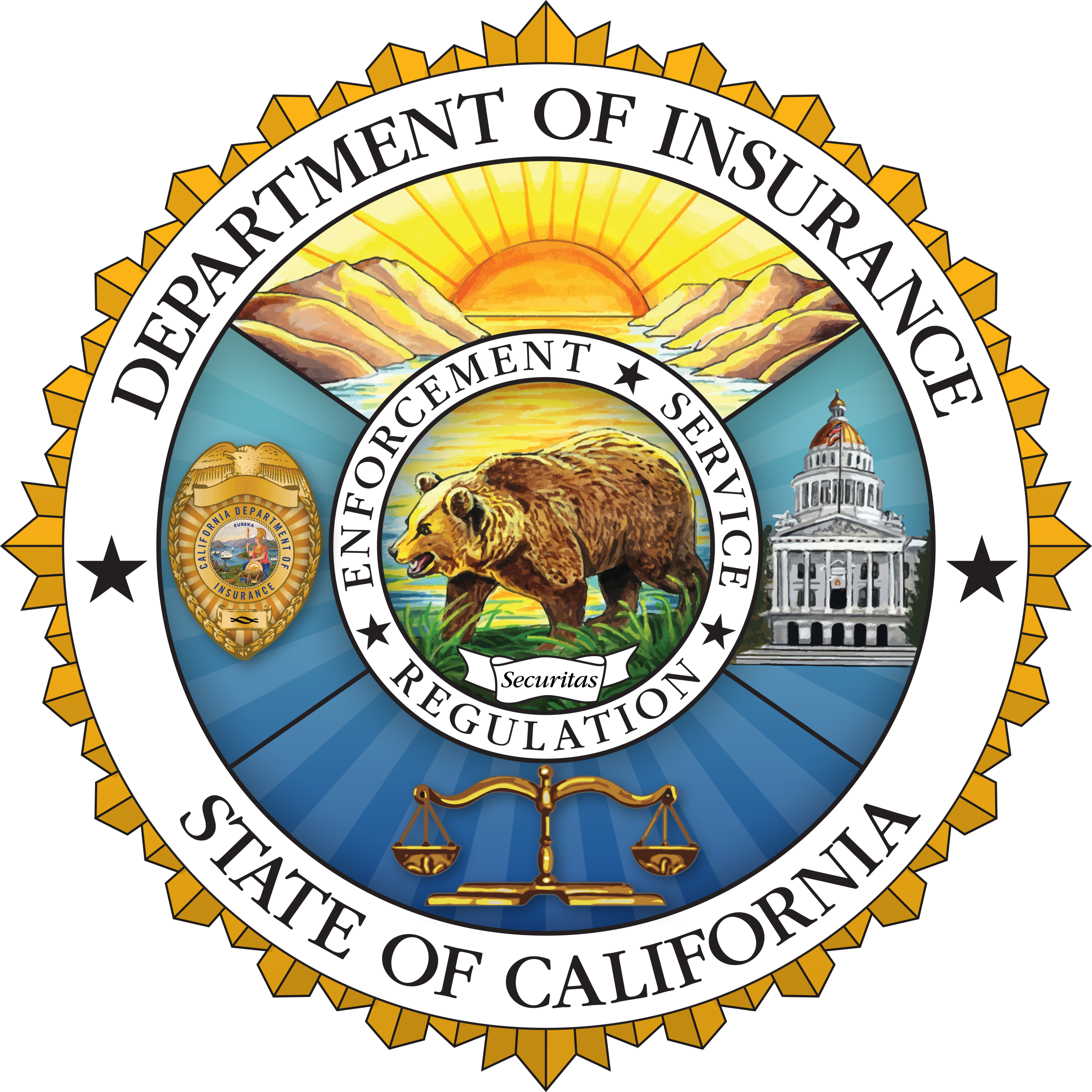

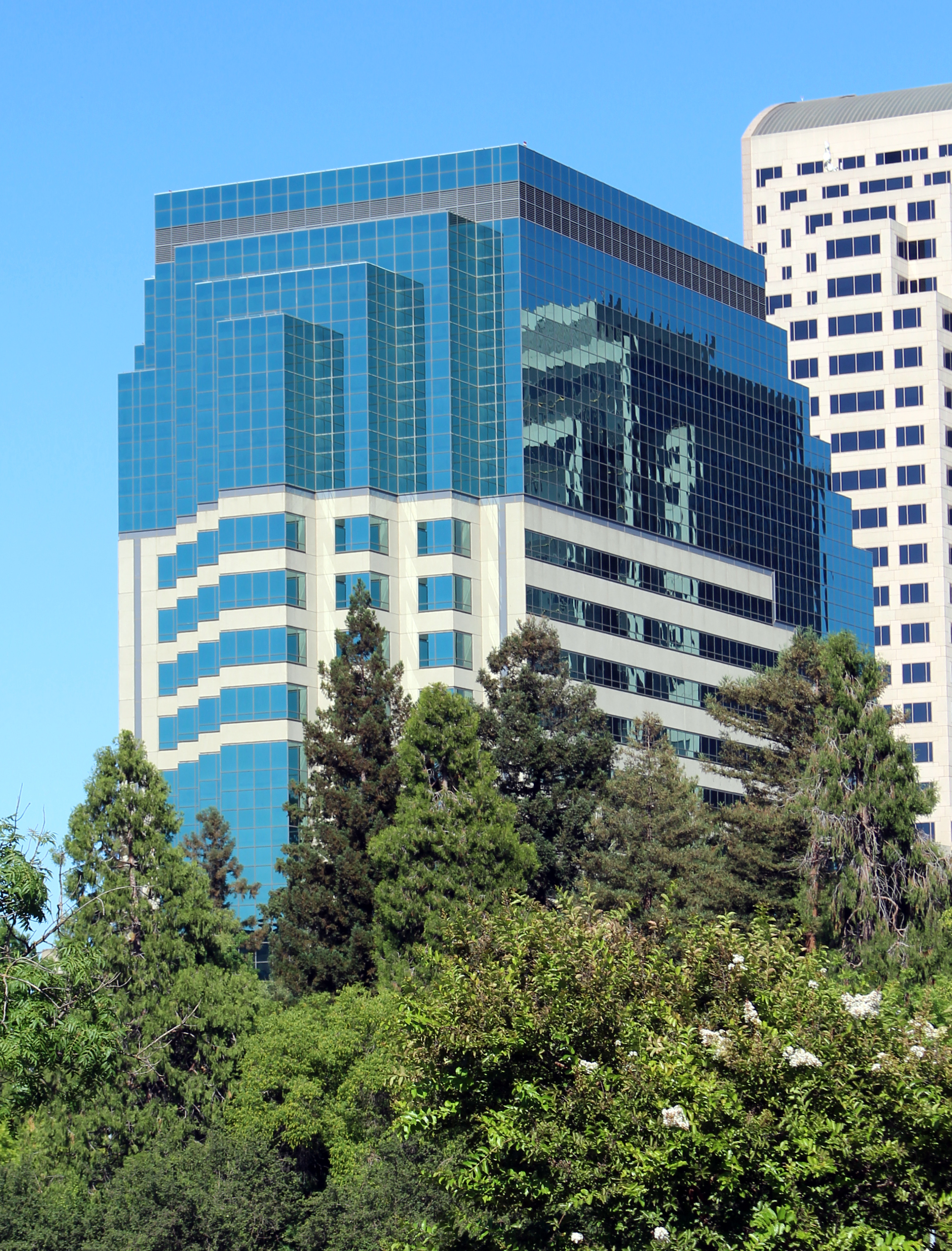
- CDI headquarters at 300 Capitol Mall in Sacramento

Agency overview
- Formed: 1868
- Headquarters: 300 Capitol Mall, Suite 1700 Sacramento, California
- Employees: 1,403
- Annual budget: $287 million (2018–2019)
- Agency executive: Ricardo Lara, Insurance Commissioner
- Website: www.insurance.ca.gov

The California Department of Insurance (CDI), established in 1868, is the agency charged with overseeing insurance regulations, enforcing statutes mandating consumer protections, educating consumers, and fostering the stability of insurance markets in California. The CDI has authority over how the insurance industry conducts business within California, and licenses and regulates the rates and practices of insurance companies, agents, and brokers in the state.

Continuing education for insurance professionals is regulated by each state's Department for Insurance, although there are commonalties across the states. See Insurance Continuing Education.

CDI has over 1,300 employees charged with the responsibility of protecting consumer interests. Its budget is primarily derived from funds generated by license fees, assessments, and Proposition 103 recoupment fees. The CDI licenses over 1,500 insurance companies and more than 320,000 insurance agents and insurance brokers in the state of California, United States. The current California Insurance Commissioner is Ricardo Lara.

== History ==
In the early 1900s, the California State Legislature transformed the CDI into a law enforcement agency when it passed new anti-fraud insurance legislation. The legislation provided sworn peace officers to investigate and arrest those who commit fraud.

=== Proposition 103 (1988) ===
On November 8, 1988, California voters passed Proposition 103, by a narrow margin (51%), on the promise of providing consumers with a 20% rate rollback. It also broadened the Department of Insurance's responsibility for enforcement to include property insurance, automobile insurance, life insurance and other types of casualty coverage, including a requirement that the property and casualty insurance premium rates must be pre-approved by the department. Proposition 103 also changed the status of the California Insurance Commissioner to that of an elected official, from being a governor-appointed position. Proposition 103 also expanded the department's important role in consumer affairs.

In 2001, the CDI implemented and began overseeing the Slavery Era Insurance Registry, as per new legislation requirements signed into law in 2000. The registry was created to require insurance companies to disclose any historical data regarding slavery insurance policies they might have from the early days of California for the purposes of historical research, genealogy, and to preserve any evidence which might be material to reparations claims.

== Consumer protection ==
The CDI helps consumers by regulating how insurance companies market and administer their policies, and is charged with the responsibility of ensuring that insurance business transacted in the state is conducted in an honest, open, and fair manner. The CDI has a Rate Regulation Branch, established under the provisions of Proposition 103, that is responsible for reviewing proposed personal auto and homeowners insurance rates to ensure that they are fair, reasonable, and adequate.

The CDI issues cease and desist orders against service contract providers operating without the required legal documentation as part of its efforts to protect California consumers.

== Licensing ==
The California Insurance Code (CIC) requires that the CDI provides licensing examinations for brokers and agents, and that the department must investigate suspected violations of the CIC by businesses and individuals who possess CDI licenses. The CDI also oversees the licensing of bail bond agents. The CDI also oversees the licensing of service contract providers.

== Criminal investigation ==
The CDI, Enforcement Branch, is charged with responsibility of detecting, investigating and arresting those who commit insurance fraud, in order to protect the public from economic loss and distress. In 1979, Chapter 12 of the California Insurance code established the "Bureau of Fraudulent Claims" to investigate criminal insurance violations. In 1980, the fraud investigators became sworn peace officers under Penal Code 830.3(i). In 1988, the Bureau of Fraudulent claims was reclassified as the "Fraud Division." During the 1990s, after John Garamendi was elected the first Insurance Commissioner of California, the Investigative Branch of the Department of Insurance was renamed the "Enforcement Branch" and divided into two units: the Fraud Division (criminal investigations to primarily enforce Penal Code 550) and the Investigations Divisions (civil as well as criminal agent/broker Fraud as well as bail bondsmen regulations). The Enforcement Branch is staffed with over 300 members with approximately 175 sworn members who are housed in 9 regional offices across the state. Investigators from the CDI work closely other law enforcement agencies and prosecutors to enforce the Insurance Code and related Penal Codes. The Fraud Division receives over 25,000 criminal complaints each year from insurance carriers and members of the public. The sworn investigators, who carry the rank of Detective, carry out the investigations in a vertical prosecution manner with the local district attorney. The Fraud Division has funding codified in California law to investigate the following areas of insurance fraud: Automobile, Workers' Compensation, Property Life and Casualty, Disability and Healthcare Fraud. In recent years, the some notable cases the Fraud Division has brought to prosecution are:

- Operation Spinal Cap
- Operation Backlash
- Landmark Medical Management

== Consumer education ==
The CDI publishes brochures and maintains a website to help consumers become aware of their rights, and to aid them in making informed insurance decisions. As part of the department's mission to protect consumers, an Education and Outreach Program has been established to provide speakers who participate in public events such as town hall meetings, business and community fairs, and professional association events.
