= Green Party of California =

California affiliate of the Green Party

- Founded: February 4, 1990; 36 years ago
- Membership (2026): ▲113,790
- Ideology: Green politics
- Political position: Left-wing
- National affiliation: Green Party of the United States
- Seats in the U.S. Senate: 0 / 2
- Seats in the U.S. House: 0 / 52
- Statewide executive offices: 0 / 8
- Seats in the State Senate: 0 / 40
- Seats in the State Assembly: 0 / 80
- Other elected officials: 23 (February 2024)

Website
- www.cagreens.org

The Green Party of California (GPCA) is a California political party. The party is led by a coordinating committee, and decisions are ultimately made by general assemblies. The GPCA is affiliated with the Green Party of the United States (GPUS).

As of September 5, 2025, there are 113,050 people registered to vote with Green party-preference, 0.49%, the seventh-largest. As of January 2022, there are twenty-nine California Green elected officials, including two elected-mayors and three in municipal councils.

== History ==
On February 4, 1990, Greens gathered at California State University, Sacramento, authored bylaws, founded the GPCA, and started a voter registration drive. The GPCA adopted the leaf-G logo which cartoonist Harry Driggs designed for the Green Party of San Francisco in the 1980s and which represents the letter G of the party name as a leaf. (Note: Driggs also represented the Es in Green as leaves.)

=== Qualifying for elections ===
On January 2, 1990, a month before foundation, Kent Smith sent notice to the secretary of state that the GPCA intends to qualify for the June 2, 1992 primary elections. At that time, there were 420 people registered to vote with Green preference and, to obtain this qualification, the party needed to have registrations of at least one percent of the vote in the previous gubernatorial general election, (Note: not the gubernatorial race, but the election as a whole, which included other races) on December 31, 1991, the 154th day before the election. (Note: These criteria were replaced with the passage of Assembly Bill No. 2351.) Following the 1990 election, this amounted to 78,992 people.

For the voter registration drive, the GPCA had two full-time fundraisers and hired Joe Louis Hoffman as full-time organizer. By November 11, 1991, the party had 50,000 people registered with GPCA preference. Late that November, the party received financial support and was able to pay people for obtaining registrations on a per-registration basis. By 1992, the party registered over 100,000 people with GPCA preference and thereby qualified, which it since has done continuously.

GPCA members used the election qualification to run for offices, each facing the none of the above vote option, and all but one advanced to the general. Roger Donaldson ran for state assembly district 53, later decided against it, and sent out a letter urging voters to vote for none of the above instead of him. The party did not have candidates for the presidential, nor the senatorial races.

Party registrations were down to 91,342 people on October 4, 1993. They must have still been at least 78,992 people on January 4, 1994, for the party was qualified for the June 7, 1994 primary elections.

The 1994 gubernatorial general election was the party’s first opportunity to earn qualification through electoral result. If the party had a candidate running for a statewide-elected office that received at least two percent of the vote, the party would maintain qualification until the next gubernatorial primary, that is if registrations stayed at least one fifteenth of one percent (0.067%) of the statewide total. The GPCA did indeed have a party member, Margaret Garcia, who received 3.8% of the vote in the secretary of state election, 315,079 votes, well over the two percent threshold.

8,900,593 people voted in the 1994 general election, raising the amount of registrations that could qualify a party to 89,006 people. The GPCA did not have this amount on October 24, 1995, to qualify for the March 26, 1996 primary election in this way. Had Garcia not received the total that she did, the GPCA would have lost its qualification.

In 1995, GPCA leaders, including Mike Feinstein, offered Ralph Nader the party’s qualification, which Nader accepted, to become the first person to use the GPCA’s qualification in a presidential election. Margaret Garcia criticized this, saying “How ironic that a party espousing ‘future focus’ and long term planning is using Nader as a quick fix for our dwindling numbers.”

The GPCA finally met the registrations requirement in September 1996, and had 95,080 people registered with Green preference on October 7. The party has met the registration requirements since. The party has also had further electoral results that could maintain the party’s qualification, in every election since first qualifying.

=== Electoral milestones ===
- In 1996, Greens won seats to have a majority of the city council in Arcata, with three of five seats, lasting until 1998. In 2004, Greens won another council majority there, lasting until 2006.
- In 1999, Audie Bock won election for state assembly office in Assembly district 16.
- In 2000, Matt Gonzalez won election for county office in San Francisco (which is a consolidated city-county).
- In 2006, Gayle McLaughlin won election for mayoral office in Richmond.

=== Top-two primaries ===
The GPCA opposed the June 8, 2010 primary election’s Proposition 14, which would remove access to the general elections from political parties, limiting access to the two candidates that received the most votes in a nonpartisan blanket primary, for California offices, i.e. not for the presidential race, nor local races. The proposition passed, faced court challenges, and survived those.

After Proposition 14’s implementation, three election cycles concluded without any Green candidates advancing from “top-two” primaries. Then, the 2018 US House elections saw three Green Party candidates advance to the general elections. Laura Wells ran in the House district CA-13 election, advanced from a six-candidate primary, and received 34,257 votes in the general election, or 11.6% of the vote. Kenneth Mejia ran in the House district CA-34 election, advanced from a three-candidate primary, and received 41,711 votes in the general election, or 27.5% of the vote. And Rodolfo Cortes-Barragan ran in the House district CA-40 election, advanced from the primary, and received 27,511 votes in the general election, or 22.7% of the vote. Each faced off against California Democratic Party (CDP) incumbent opponents in the general elections.

In 2020, Margaret Villa became the fourth Green candidate to advance from a top-two primary when she ran in the California State Assembly District 58 election, and she then received 41,100 votes in the general election, or 25.1% of the vote.

In 2022, Michael Kerr became the fifth Green candidate to advance when he ran in the US House of Representatives District CA-10 election. He received 52,965 votes in the general election, or 21.1% of the vote.

== Platform ==
The GPCA espouses green politics and the Ten Key Values of ecological wisdom, grassroots democracy, social justice, nonviolence, decentralization, community-based economics, feminism, respect for diversity, personal and global responsibility, and sustainability.

== Organization ==
The key values of social justice, grassroots democracy, decentralization, respect for diversity, feminism, and personal and global responsibility influence the GPCA’s structure of party membership being inclusive of California residents who are disenfranchised by the state in California or the US, (Note: provided that they affirm the Ten Key Values, and meet other criteria) party decisions being determined by general assemblies, limiting the role of its coordinating committees, entrusting its power to autonomous Green parties, composing coordinating committees through yearly, staggered-term elections of six women and six of any gender, and affiliating with the GPUS. The GPCA elects delegates to the Green National Convention (GNC) proportionally, rejecting the feature of artificial disproportionality resulting from, in examples, the general ticket or district elections. (Note: Betty Traynor, a leader within the party, wrote an article for Green Pages that advocates proportional representation (1999) and referenced Lani Guinier’s book Lift Every Voice, where Guinier wrote “I began to see how, on some level, all districting is gerrymandering, meaning that the lines of voting districts are drawn by politicians to advantage those likely to support a particular viewpoint or to be sympathetic to the overtures of an individual candidate.” (1998, p. 257).)

The party’s most recent general assembly was held by video teleconference on November 12, 2022. As of January 13, 2023, Laura Wells and David Cobb are the party’s official spokespeople; the party’s treasurer is Justin Richardson; and Jared Laiti is the GPCA liaison to the secretary of state. The GPCA has a reference page of local Green parties at www.cagreens.org/county-parties.

=== Membership ===
Greens Registered on Election Qualification Dates (Note: To reform the election code due to the consequences of Proposition 14, the California State Legislature changed the criteria by which a party could qualify for elections in 2014. The threshold to qualify for an election based on registrations is no longer derived from the vote in the preceding gubernatorial election, but rather, it is now 0.33 percent of the total number of voters registered (Gordon 2014).)
Election	Threshold	On Date	Registered	Citation
1992-06-02	78,992	1991-12-31	over 100,000	
1994-06-07	78,992	1994-01-04	unknown	
1996-03-26	89,006	1995-10-24	79,825	
1998-06-02	89,006	1997-12-30	unknown	
2000-03-07	86,177	1999-10-05	103,227	(Note: see the secretary of state’s Report of Registration page at www.sos.ca.gov/elections/report-registration)
2002-03-05	86,177	2001-10-02	144,033	
2004-03-02	77,389	2003-09-30	166,740	
2006-06-06	77,389	2006-01-03	145,786	
2008-02-05	88,991	2007-09-04	138,018	
2010-06-08	88,991	2010-01-05	111,395	
2012-06-05	103,004	2012-01-03	111,319	
2014-06-03	103,004	2013-12-31	108,785	
2016-06-07	81,129 (Note: ⌈24,584,491 x 0.33%⌉)	2016-01-05	102,688	
2018-06-05	82,752 (Note: ⌈25,076,348 x 0.33%⌉)	2018-01-02	91,631	
2020-03-03	83,179 (Note: ⌈25,205,690 x 0.33%⌉)	2019-10-01	90,762	
2022-06-07	89,024 (Note: ⌈26,976,858 x 0.33%⌉)	2022-01-04	89,997	

As of February 10, 2023, there are 97,253 people registered to vote with GPCA preference, 0.44%, the sixth-largest. The three counties in which the party has the most people registered are Los Angeles (24,829), San Diego (7,911), and Alameda counties (5,611). The counties in which the party has the highest percentages of the county’s registrations are Humboldt (1.68%), Mendocino (1.51%), and Trinity counties (1.03%).

During the 2016 presidential election, GPCA registrations dropped 30%, from nearly 110,000 to 77,868. Party spokesperson Mike Feinstein attributed the drop to outreach from the Sanders campaign, citing mailers sent to Greens. Thousands of California Greens decided to support Sanders’ endeavor for the presidential nomination of the Democratic Party of the United States of America (DPUSA) through voting, which, as there was a semi-closed election, necessitated reregistration either with CDP preference, or with no party preference (NPP), and then, requesting a crossover ballot. Gayle McLaughlin, who had won mayoral election as a Green, reregistered with NPP to vote for Sanders. The Peace and Freedom Party (PFP) saw a similar registration drop-off. The lowest point for the GPCA was around California’s primary elections in June, and by the end of the general election, the GPCA’s registrations rose back to 94,647 people, and the PFP rose back to original levels, also.

Jill Stein 2016 campaign staffer Bruce Dixon hypothesized that Sanders “aims to tie up activist energies and resources till the summer of 2016 when the only remaining choice will be the usual lesser of two evils.” Dixon determined that Sanders was acting as a sheepdog candidate in favor of party politics within certain parties, the DPUSA in this case, despite the parties being opposed to the candidate’s cause, and that dissuades people from politics outside of those parties. These directives result in a lack of parties and electoral wins of candidates that would advance the sheepdog’s stated politics. They also result in captive constituencies that feel compelled to support candidates that they deem the lessers of two evils. Sheepdogs may advocate their strategy before exiting the electoral contest, which could occur because of disqualification, including unsuccessful primary elections, or retraction of candidacy, as was advocated by Sanders before his 2016 disqualification.

== Current elected officials ==
As of November 2025, there are thirty-three California Green elected officials, including one elected-mayor and three in municipal councils.

=== Mayoral offices ===
As of November 2025, one municipality has a Green elected-mayor:

- Marina: Bruce Delgado

=== Municipal councils ===
As of November 2025, three Greens serve on municipal councils:

- Calipatria: Sylvia Chavez
- Mendota: Jesus Mendoza
- Susanville: Quincy McCourt

== Election results ==
=== Presidential ===
In the GPCA primary of the 1996 presidential election, Ralph Nader went unopposed. Nader did not receive the Greens/Green Party USA nomination, though, at Green Gathering ’96, delegates from many states stated support for Nader. In the California general election, Nader received 237,016 votes.

In the GPCA primary of the 2000 presidential election, results were affected by California’s blanket primary which the US Supreme Court shortly after ruled unconstitutional in California Democratic Party v. Jones. Ralph Nader received a winning 94.4%, and Joel Kovel, the runner-up, received 5.6%. At the GNC, in the presidential nomination election, Nader received a winning 92.5% of the potential votes, and Jello Biafra and Stephen Gaskin, the runners up, received 3.1% each. In the California general election, Nader received 418,707 votes.

In the GPCA primary of the 2004 presidential election, Peter Camejo received a winning 75.7%, and David Cobb, the runner-up, received 11.5%. At the GNC, in the presidential nomination election, none of the options received majority support in the first round and, then, Camejo was eliminated because he didn’t give written indication that he would accept the nomination. In the second round, Cobb received a winning 53% of the potential votes, and No Nominee, the runner up option, received 40%. (Note: Ballot Access News’ report says that the GP of Florida delegation submitted 24 votes, as in the first round, one being Abstain, and The Green Papers’ says they submitted 23, and no Abstain vote.) In that vote, the GPCA delegation gave to No Nominee 68.2% of its votes and to Cobb 26.5%. In the California general election, Cobb received 40,771 votes, and Ralph Nader, the party-independent write-in candidate that Camejo was running mate to, received 20,714 votes.

In the GPCA primary of the 2008 presidential election, Ralph Nader received a winning 60.7%, and Cynthia McKinney, the runner-up, received 26.6%. At the GNC, Nader did not seek the GPUS presidential nomination and, in the presidential nomination election, McKinney received a winning 59.59% of the potential votes, and Nader, as runner up, received 14.48%. (Note: The GPUS miscalculated the totals, giving McKinney one of Nader’s votes. Ballot Access News lumped together the differing No Nominee, None of the Above, and Uncommitted votes as votes for “Uncomm.”) In the California general election, McKinney received 38,774 votes, and Nader, on the Peace and Freedom Party (PFP) ballot line, received 108,381 votes.

In the GPCA primary of the 2012 presidential election, Jill Stein received a winning 49.4%, and Roseanne Barr, the runner-up, received 39.8%. At the GNC, in the presidential nomination election, Stein received a winning 66.96% of the potential votes, and Barr, as runner up, received 24.91%. In the California general election, Stein received 85,638 votes, and Barr, on the PFP ballot line, received 53,824 votes.

In the GPCA primary of the 2016 presidential election, Jill Stein received a winning 76.2%, and Darryl Cherney, the runner-up, received 10%. At the GNC, in the presidential nomination election, Stein received a winning 82% of the potential votes, and William Kreml, the runner up, received 6%. (Note: Ballot Access News says Stein and Kreml received 239.5 and 18.25 votes, respectively, out of 292.5, and The Green Papers says they received 233.5 and 18.5, respectively, out of 286.) In the California general election, Stein received 278,657 votes, more than tripling her 2012 vote. Stein did the same nationwide, receiving 1,457,218 votes.

In the GPCA primary of the 2020 presidential election, Howie Hawkins received a winning 36.2%, and the runner-up received 22.0%. At the GNC, in the presidential nomination election, Hawkins received a winning 58.82% of the potential votes, and the runner up received 28.57%. (Note: Ballot Access News lumped together the differing No Nominee, None of the Above, and Uncommitted votes as votes for “no one,” and mistakenly has Moyowasifza-Curry receiving 3 votes from the Texas party, when she in fact received none from that party, though the total sum is correct.) In the California general election, Hawkins received 81,029 votes.

=== Gubernatorial ===
Election	Candidate	Votes Received		Citation
1994-11-08	No Candidate	N/A	N/A	
1998-11-03	Dan Hamburg	104,117	1.24%	
2002-11-05	Peter Camejo	393,036	5.30%	
2003-10-07	Peter Camejo	242,247	2.8%	
2003-10-07	Ivan Hall	2,346	0.0%	
2003-10-07	Daniel Watts	2,021	0.0%	
2003-10-07	Maurice Walker	1,236	0.0%	
2003-10-07	Total	247,850	2.9%	
2006-11-07	Peter Camejo	205,995	2.3%	
2010-11-02	Laura Wells	129,224	1.2%	
2014-06-03	Luis J. Rodriguez	66,872	1.5%	
2018-06-05	Christopher Carlson	7,302	0.1%	
2018-06-05	Josh Jones	16,131	0.2%	
2018-06-05	Veronika Fimbres	62	0.0%	
2018-06-05	Total	23,495	0.3%	
2021-09-14	Dan Kapelovitz	64,375	0.9%	
2021-09-14	Heather Collins	24,260	0.3%	
2021-09-14	Total	88,635	1.2%	
2022-06-07	Luis J. Rodriguez	124,672	1.8%	
2022-06-07	Heather Collins	29,690	0.4%	
2022-06-07	Total	154,362	2.2%	

=== Election qualifying ===
Election	#	Race	Votes Received		Citation
1994-11-08	1	Secretary of state Margaret Garcia	315,079	3.83%	
1998-11-03	1	Lieutenant gubernatorial Sara Amir	247,702	3.04%	
2002-11-05	1	Gubernatorial; Peter Camejo	393,036	5.30%	
2002-11-05	2	Lieutenant gubernatorial Donna Warren	307,254	4.20%	
2002-11-05	3	Secretary of state Larry Shoup	282,340	3.90%	
2002-11-05	4	Controller; Laura Wells	419,873	5.80%	
2002-11-05	5	Treasurer; Jeanne-Marie Rosenmeier	356,077	4.90%	
2002-11-05	6	Attorney general Glen Mowrer	283,173	3.90%	
2002-11-05	7	Insurance commissioner David Sheidlower	277,667	3.90%	
2006-11-07	1	Gubernatorial; Peter Camejo	205,995	2.3%	
2006-11-07	2	Lieutenant gubernatorial Donna Warren	239,107	2.8%	
2006-11-07	3	Secretary of state Forrest Hill	181,369	2.2%	
2006-11-07	4	Controller; Laura Wells	260,047	3.2%	
2006-11-07	5	Treasurer; Mehul Thakker	201,670	2.4%	
2006-11-07	6	Attorney general Michael Wyman	195,130	2.3%	
2006-11-07	7	Insurance commissioner Larry Cafiero	270,218	3.2%	
2010-11-02	1	Secretary of state Ann Menasche	286,694	3%	
2010-11-02	2	Treasurer; Charles "Kit" Crittenden	231,160	2.4%	
2010-11-02	3	Attorney general Peter Allen	258,879	2.7%	
2010-11-02	4	Insurance commissioner William Balderston	252,301	2.6%	
2014-06-03	1	Lieutenant gubernatorial Jena Goodman	98,338	2.4%	
2014-06-03	2	Secretary of state David Curtis	121,618	3%	
2014-06-03	3	Controller; Laura Wells	231,352	5.7%	
2014-06-03	4	Treasurer; Ellen Brown	270,388	6.6%	
2018-06-05	1	Secretary of state Mike Feinstein; Erik Rydberg	185,432	2.80%	
2022-06-07	1	Gubernatorial; Luis J. Rodriguez; Heather Collins	154,362	2.2%	
2022-06-07	2	Secretary of state Gary Blenner	205,630	3.0%	
2022-06-07	3	Controller; Laura Wells	258,053	3.8%	
2022-06-07	4	Attorney general Dan Kapelovitz	219,912	3.2%	

In 2014, to reform the election code due to the consequences of Proposition 14, the California State Legislature changed the criteria by which a party could qualify for elections. The threshold to qualify based on electoral results is now based on the sum of the votes cast for all of a party’s candidates for a statewide-elected office in the preceding gubernatorial primary election.

For 2022 elections of statewide executive offices, the GPCA, together with the PFP, undertook a cooperative ballot-access strategy in continuation of the Howie Hawkins 2020 presidential campaign’s attempt for “left unity”, consisting of endorsing an inter-party slate. A success, Greens met the threshold in the four races that the slate endorsed Greens. Luis J. Rodriguez was the slate’s gubernatorial candidate, and Heather Collins, another Green, deviated from the slate and also ran in that race, and only together did they receive votes to meet the threshold. Other Greens that deviated from the slate did not meet the threshold. Veronika Fimbres in the insurance commissioner election did not meet the threshold. James “Henk” Conn and Pamela Elizondo in the US senatorial election did not meet the threshold.

== Notable members ==
- Barbara Becnel
- Medea Benjamin
- Jello Biafra
- Audie Bock
- Ellen Brown
- Peter Camejo
- Darryl Cherney
- David Cobb (activist)
- Harry Driggs
- Mike Feinstein
- Matt Gonzalez
- Daniel Hamburg
- Nativo Lopez
- Gayle McLaughlin
- Kenneth Mejia
- Ross Mirkarimi
- Larry Robinson (poet)
- Luis J. Rodriguez
- Kent Warner Smith
- Charlene Spretnak
- Dona Spring
- Laura Wells

== See also ==
- Green Party (United States)
- Richmond Progressive Alliance
