= Green Senatorial Campaign Committee =

- Green Party Logo
- Founded: 2006; 20 years ago
- Headquarters: 5031 Catharine St; Philadelphia, PA 19143, U.S.
- Key people: Seven National Co-chairs; Hillary Kane (Treasurer)
- Website: GSCC Website (Archived)

The Green Senatorial Campaign Committee (GSCC), also known as the National Green Senatorial Campaign Committee (NGSCC), is a Green Party committee working to elect Greens to the United States Senate. The organization was formed during the 2006 election cycle, operating similarly to a political action committee. In September 2007, it applied to the Federal Election Commission to be formally recognized as a campaign committee, and the following year, their request was unanimously approved. This marked the first time a party other than the Democrats or Republicans have had a Senatorial Campaign Committee recognized by the FEC.

In the 2008 election cycle, the committee announced its plans to focus on opposing senators who continued to support funding for the Iraq War. As of the 2020 election cycle, the Federal Election Commission recognized the committee as "active".

== History ==
=== Early years ===
The Green Senatorial Campaign Committee came into being for the 2006 midterm elections, in June 2006. The committee, which initially was based in Minneapolis and lacked official recognition by the Federal Election Commission (FEC), as a result had to operate in the style a political action committee, limited to $5,000 in expenditures per candidate. During the 2006 elections the GSCC contributed to seven senatorial campaigns, with contributions averaging $200 each.

=== FEC recognition ===
In September 2006, the Green Party applied to the FEC for official recognition as a senatorial campaign committee. The case was heard on February 8, 2007. The following day, in an advisory opinion, the FEC recommended — in a 6-0 decision — that the Green Party's request be granted, thus making them the third political party, following Democratic and Republican parties and preceding the Libertarian Party, to receive this designation.

Upon their receipt of this recognition, party officials declined to explain their entire strategy for the 2008 election cycle, but indicated that they would give special emphasis to challenging senators who continued to support US military intervention in Iraq. In a statement on its new website, the committee elaborated on this focus, writing that "As its first act after receiving FEC recognition, the GSCC called upon all U.S. Senators to vote against further funding of the U.S. occupation of Iraq, or any resolutions promising such funding, including currently proposed concurrent resolutions promising funding 'for troops'."

=== Later history ===
In October 2010, the party announced that its senatorial campaign committee was disbursing the first round of funds to that year's candidates. The committee ultimately provided financial support to ten congressional campaigns during that cycle.

In the 2018 election cycle, the committee continued to accept donations, but did not record any disbursements to political candidates. It did, however, reimburse $1,800 of donations to individual donors, and record $3,200 in operating expenditures. During the 2020 election cycle, the FEC recorded that the committee had reported five dollars in operating expenditures, that it began the period with $137.27 cash on hand, and that it ended the period with $132.27 cash on hand. As of 2020, the FEC continues to recognize the GSCC as an "active" committee.

== Structure ==
Legally, the GSCC operates independently of the Green Party of the United States. Nonetheless, the committee's members are selected by the national party; the national party was also responsible for the committee's creation, and for the passage of its bylaws.

The GSCC is composed of a seven-member committee elected by the National Committee of the Green Party of the United States (GPUS).

=== 2007 ===
From July 23 to July 29, 2007, the party held elections for the committee. The committee was to have seven seats, and seven candidates ran, meaning that all seven secured spots on the committee. One member, Jim Lendall of Arkansas, left before his term expired, so in 2008 there was one vacancy.

The committee, as elected in July 2007, was as follows:

- Teresa Keane (Oregon) — Chair
- Anita Wessling (Arkansas) — Vice-chair
- Brent White (Washington) — Secretary
- Dave Jette (Washington) — Treasurer and webmaster
- Eric Oines (Minnesota) — Assistant treasurer
- Marc Sanson (Illinois)
- Jim Lendall (Arkansas) (departed by April 2008)

=== 2009 ===
In April 2009, the committee's membership was as follows:

- Ron Hardy (Wisconsin) - Chair
- Josh Krekeler (Ohio) - Secretary
- Chris Lugo (Tennessee)
- Gloria Mattera (New York)
- Deb McFarland (Arkansas)
- Paul McFarland (Arkansas)
- Anita Wessling (Arkansas)

=== 2011 ===
As of June 2011, five individuals sat on the council:

- Matt Lavery (New York) - Chair
- David McCorquodale (Delaware) - Treasurer
- Ann Link (New York) - Secretary
- Gloria Mattera (New York)
- Lou Novak (Michigan)

== See also ==
- Green National Committee
- Democratic Senatorial Campaign Committee (DSCC)
- National Republican Senatorial Committee (NRSC)
- Hill committee
