= Leaders of political parties in the United States =

Leaders of political parties in the United States may refer to:

== Chairpersons of party national committees ==
- Democratic National Committee#List of DNC Chairs
- Green National Committee#Steering committee
- Libertarian National Committee#List of LNC Chairs
- Republican National Committee#Chairmen and Chairwomen of the Republican National Committee

== Party leaders in the United States Congress ==
- Party leaders of the United States Senate
- Party leaders of the United States House of Representatives
