= 2008 Green National Convention =

July 2008 Green Party convention in Chicago

- 2008 presidential election

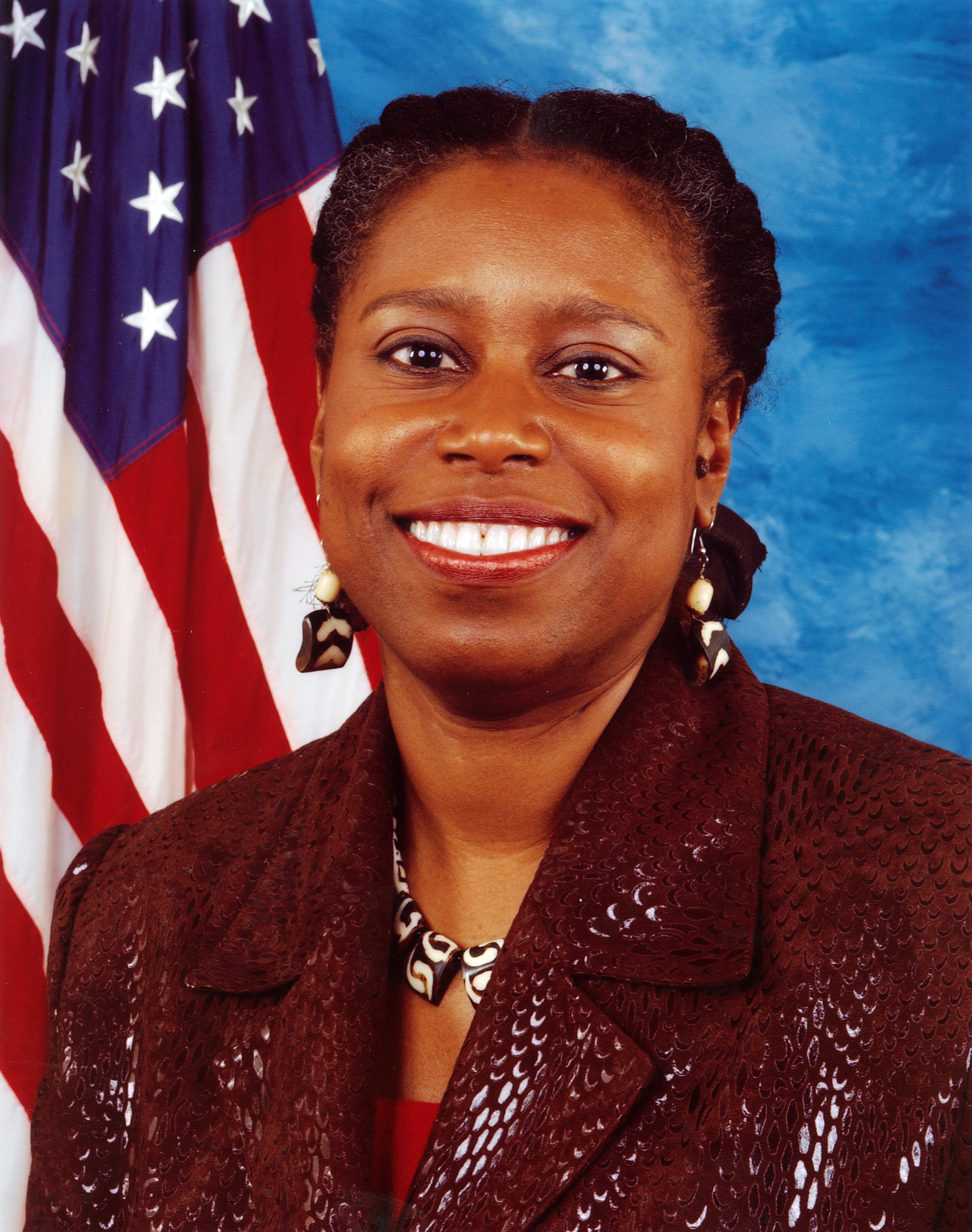
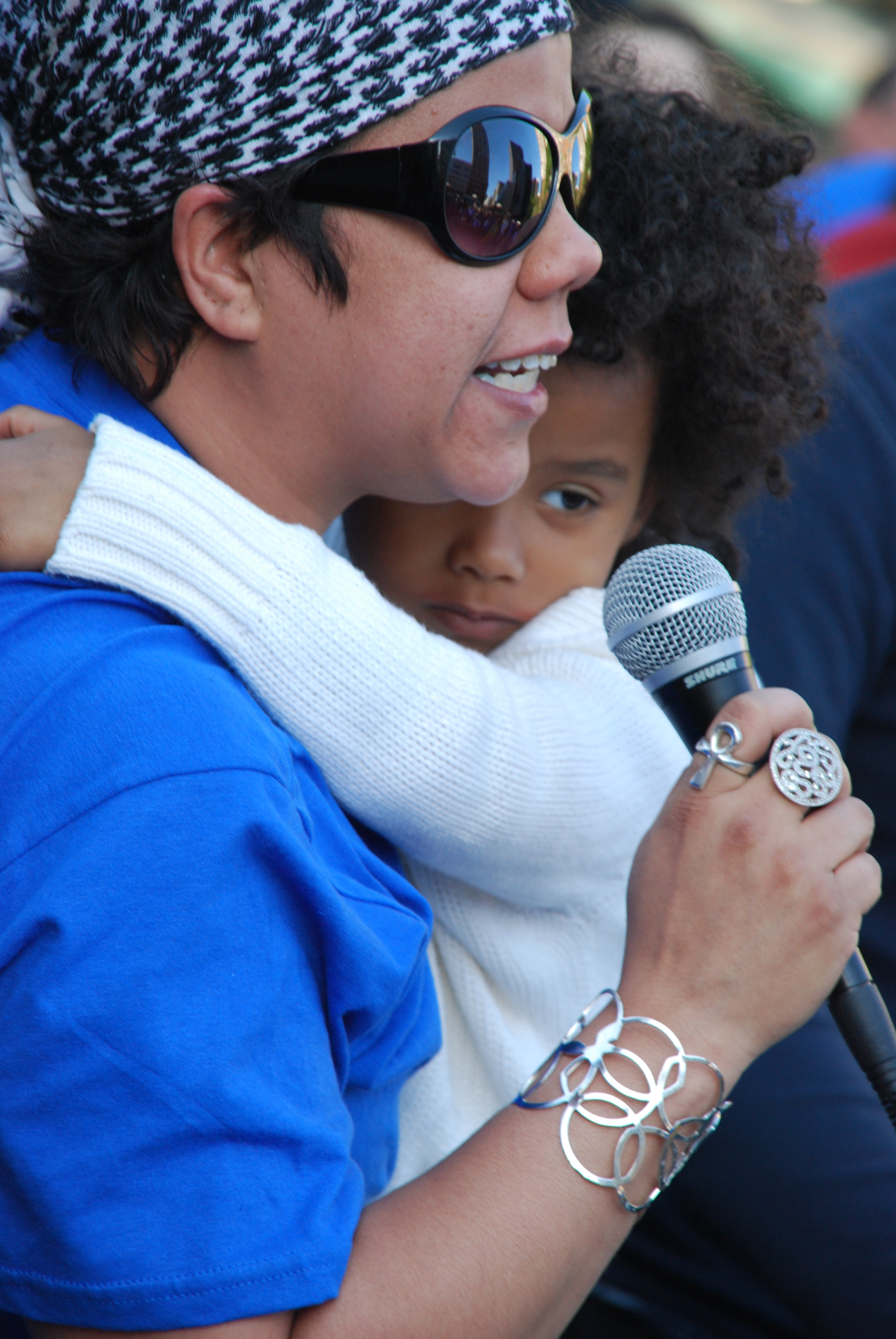
- Nominees; McKinney and Clemente

Convention
- Date(s): July 10–14, 2008
- City: Chicago, Illinois
- Venue: Palmer House Hilton (July 10, 11 and 13); Symphony Center (July 12)

Candidates
- Presidential nominee: Cynthia McKinney of Georgia
- Vice-presidential nominee: Rosa Clemente of New York
- Other candidates: Chm. Kat Swift (TX)

Sites of the 2008 national presidential nominating conventions

The 2008 Green National Convention took place on July 10–14, 2008 in Chicago, Illinois at the Palmer House Hilton and Symphony Center. This served as both the venue for the National Convention and the Annual Meeting of the Green Party of the United States.

== Venues ==
The convention was headquartered at the historic Palmer House Hilton, while the nomination event itself took place at the nearby Symphony Center on July 12.

== Theme ==
The theme of the convention was, "Live Green, Vote Green".

== Events ==
=== July 10 ===
Main Events

- Introductory news conference and a reception for international Greens.
- Welcome Reception with International Greens

Additional Events

- Credentialing Committee meeting
- Accreditation Committee meeting
- Diversity Caucus meeting
- Platform Committee meeting
- Lavender Caucus meeting
- International Committee Meeting
- Ballot Access Committee Meeting
- National Women's Caucus
- New York State Caucus
- Bylaws, Rules, Policies & Procedures (BRPP) Committee Meeting
- California State Caucus
- Workshops:
  - GPUS Budget & Finances in General: Input, Q&A, and more (presented by Jody Grage and Jim Coplen)
  - Selling Yourself Without Selling Out (hosted by Scott McLarty)
  - A Clear Path Towards Dismantling and Ending All "ism" (Racism, sexism, classism and white privilege) within the Green Party by 2012 (facilitated by Sedinam Kinamo Christin Moyowasifza-Curry)
  - Viral Campaign Marketing (presented by Jim Carr)
  - What Every Candidate Should Know (presented Brent McMillan)
  - What is Local Democracy? Building from the Bottom Up for Political Power (led by Juscha E. M. Robinson, Brenda Konkel, Pete Karas)

=== July 11 ===
Main events

- National Committee Meeting
- News conferences for elected Greens, Green presidential candidates, and candidates for other offices
- Presidential Candidates Forum. moderated by Rich Whitney
- Evening reception with John Nichols

Other Events

- Morning Yoga
- Eco-Action Committee meeting
- Presidential Candidate Support Committee meeting
- Outreach Committee meeting
- Black Caucus meeting
- Dispute Resolution Committee meeting
- Disability Caucus meeting
- Youth Caucus meeting
- Maine State Caucus meeting
- Latino Caucus meeting
- Workshops
  - Fundraising 101 (featuring panelists LaVerne Butler, Angel Torres, George Martin, David Cobb, Jody Grange, Emily Citkowski, Tamar Yager)
  - The Role of Peace Movement in an Election Year (presented by Bruce Gagnon, Steve Shafarman and moderated by Ann Wilcox)
  - What is Central to the Green Message: Ecology? Democracy? Social Justice? (presented Gloria Mattera, Ben Manski and John Rensenbrink, moderated by Mary Beth Sullivan)
  - Sustainable Activism (presented by Alison Duncan)
  - The 60th Anniversaries of the Palestinian Catastrophe (Nakba) and the UN Universal Declaration of Human Rights: Green Party's Response
  - The Constitutional MAP for Voter Disenfranchisement
  - Update on NAFTA and the North American Security and Prosperity Partnership (SPP)
  - The Law of Diminishing Returns as a Principle for Deciding How to Deal with the Need to Reduce Consumption to Restore the Environment
  - Organizing Online for Everyone
  - Campaign Fundraising
  - Candidate Messaging
  - Making Green Food Choices – How our diet affects animals and the environment
  - Democratizing the Electoral College
  - Endless War and the Military-Industrial- Governmental Complex
  - Red, Black, Brown and 'Green': Positive Solutions to the Issues of Poverty, Immigration and Environment Destruction
  - A Democracy Movement for the U.S.A.
  - The Basic Income Guarantee - and the Power of Green Economics

=== July 12 ===
Main events

- Platform vote
- Keynote speeches by Cliff Thornton, Kathy Kelly, Malik Rahim, Jill Stein, Omar López
- Speeches by Green Party presidential candidates
- Presidential nomination vote
- Vice presidential nomination and speech
- Presidential speech
- Press conference
- Post-convention reception at Palmer House

=== July 13 ===
Main events

- National Committee meeting with the new presidential nominee

Other events

- Morning meditation led by Lewie Pell of the Network for Spiritual Progressives
- Green Alliance Meeting
- Workshops:
  - Agrarian Revival at the End of Cheap Oil
  - What to say when you're called a spoiler: instant runoff voting & proportional representation
  - LGBT Activism: Recent Victories and Future Goals
  - History of US-Iranian Relations and Its Impact on Current Tensions Regarding Iranian Nuclear Power
  - Strategic Thinking for Campaigns
  - Elections for Radicals

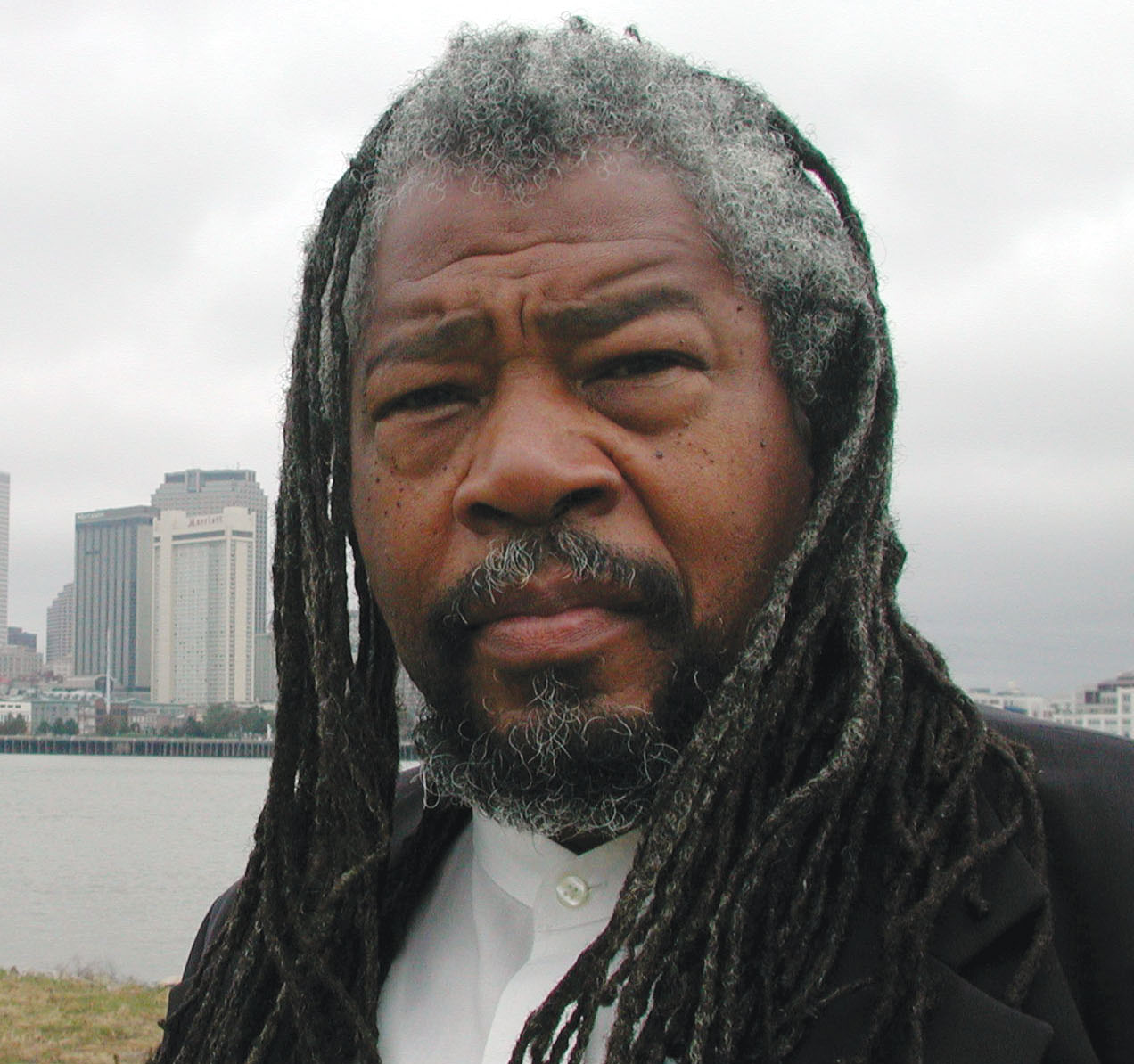
Malik Rahim

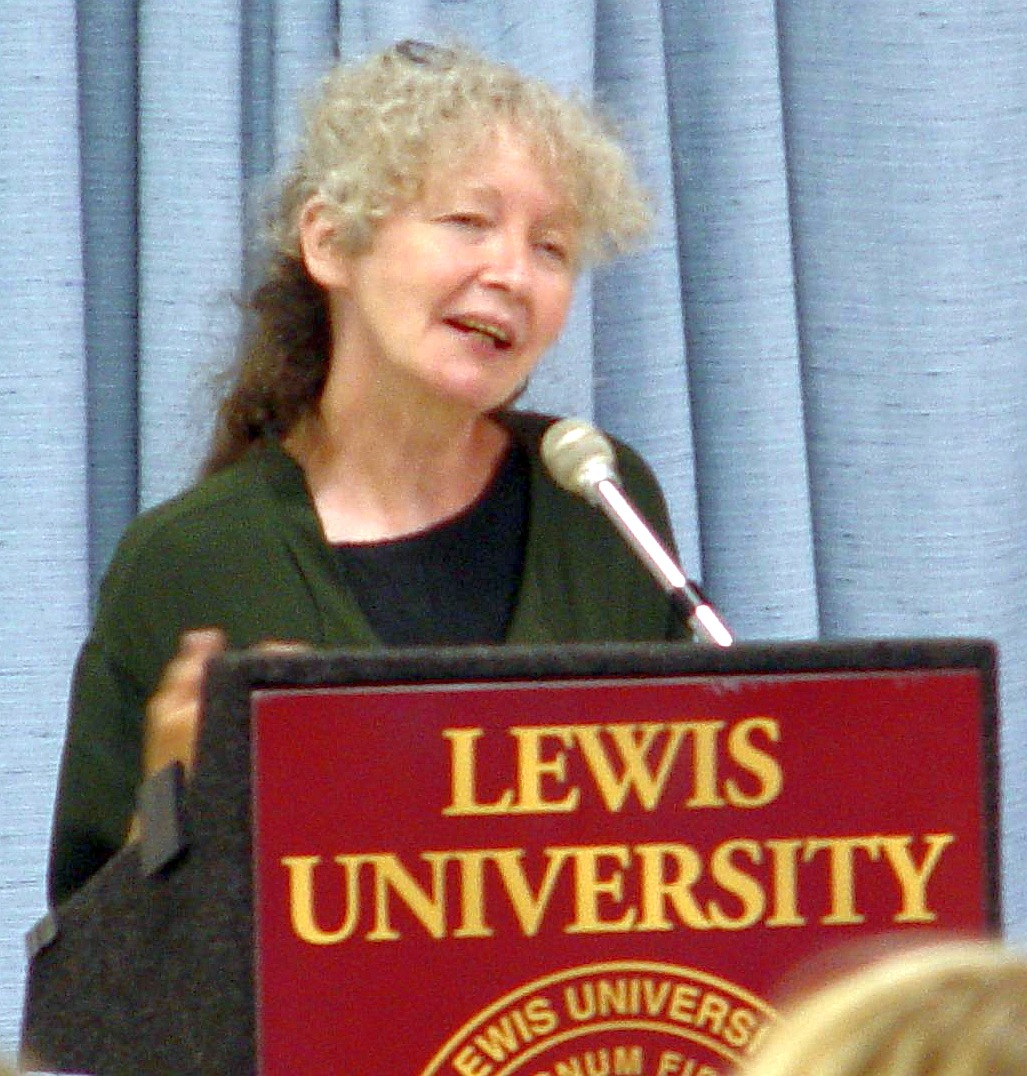
Kathy Kelly

== Speakers ==
Notable speakers included:

Name	Position/Notability
David Cobb	Activist 2004 Green Party presidential nominee
Pat LaMarche	Activist 2004 Green Party vice presidential nominee
Rich Whitney	Green party nominee for the 2006 Illinois gubernatorial election
John Nichols	Journalism
Malik Rahim	Activist Former Black Panther Green party nominee for LA-02 in 2008
Kathy Kelly	
Cliff Thornton Jr	Activist Green party nominee for the 2006 Connecticut gubernatorial election
Omar López	Green party nominee for IL-04 in 2008
Jill Stein	Physician Green party nominee in the 2002 Massachusetts gubernatorial election
Brent McMillan	GPUS Political Director (2004–2009)
Sedinam Kinamo Christin Moyowasifza-Curry	[?]
Jim Carr	[?]
Ben Manski	
John Rensenbrink	Political sciencist Conservationist Co-founder of the Green Party

== Presidential nomination ==
The presidential nomination took place July 12 at Chicago's Symphony Center.

=== Candidates ===
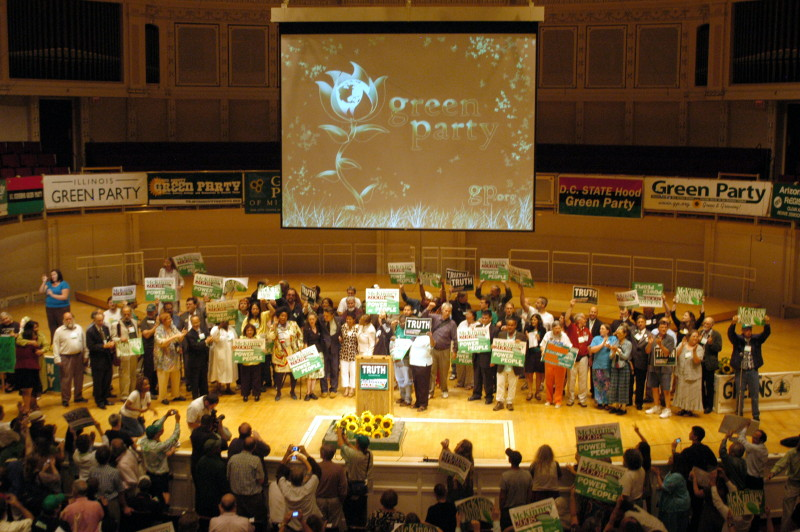
stage at the Symphony Center after Cynthia McKinney accepted the presidential nomination

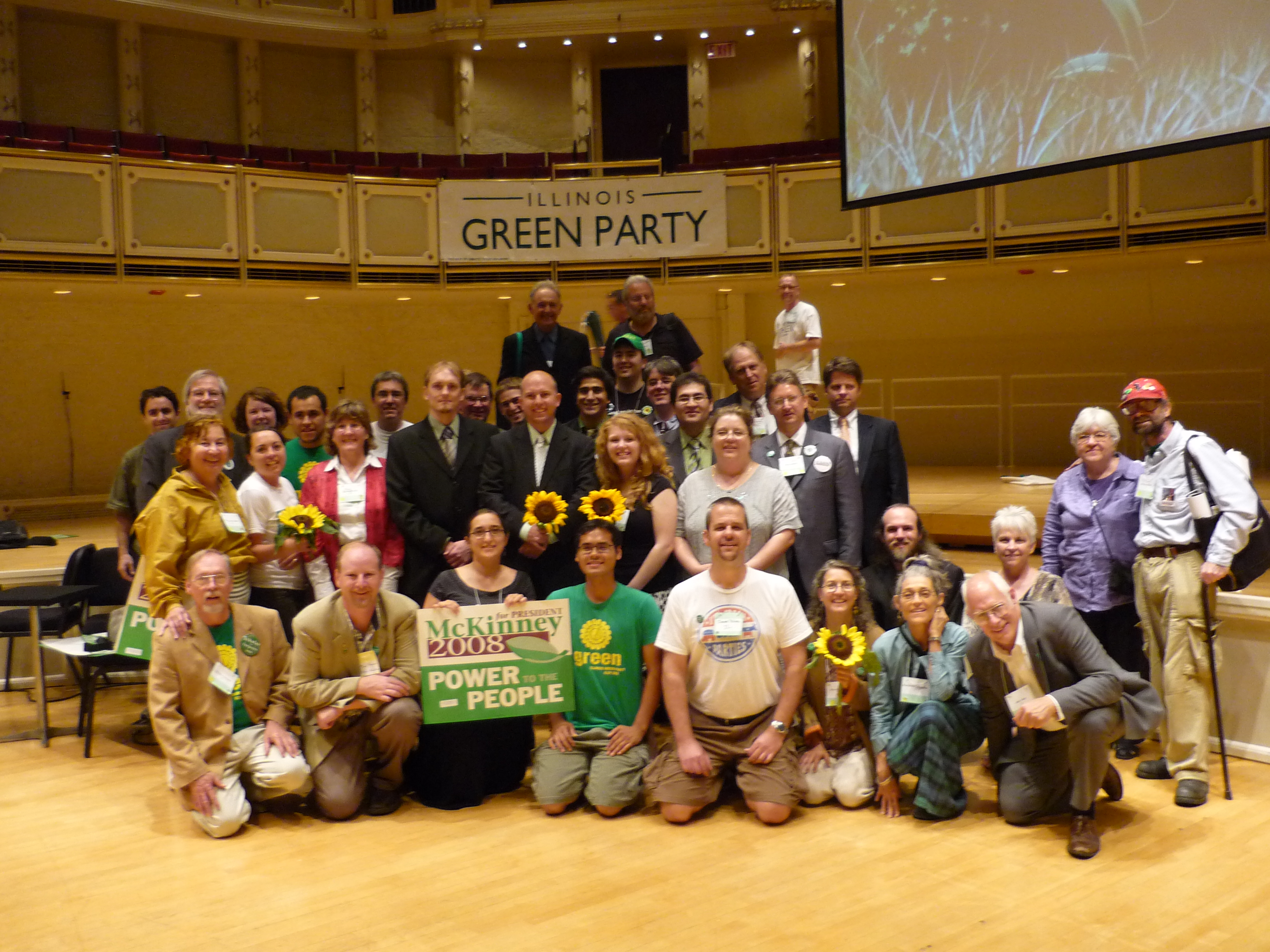
Illinois delegation at the convention

Withdrew
Jared Ball of Maryland, college professor and journalist

Withdrew
Elaine Brown, former Black Panther Party chairwoman

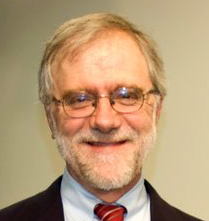
Howie Hawkins of New York, activist

Jesse Johnson of West Virginia, former Mountain Party candidate for US Senate and Governor of West Virginia

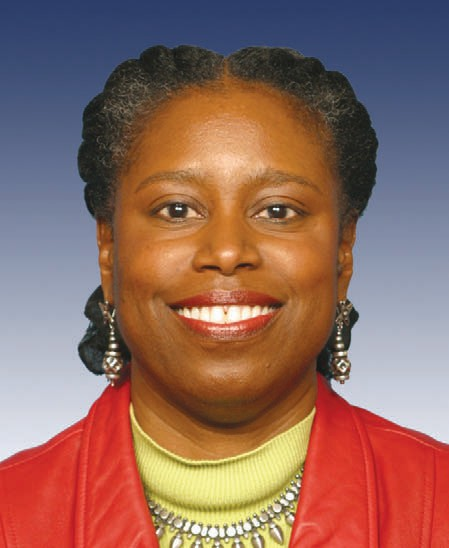
Cynthia McKinney of Georgia, former Congresswoman from Georgia's 4th district
(Campaign • Website)

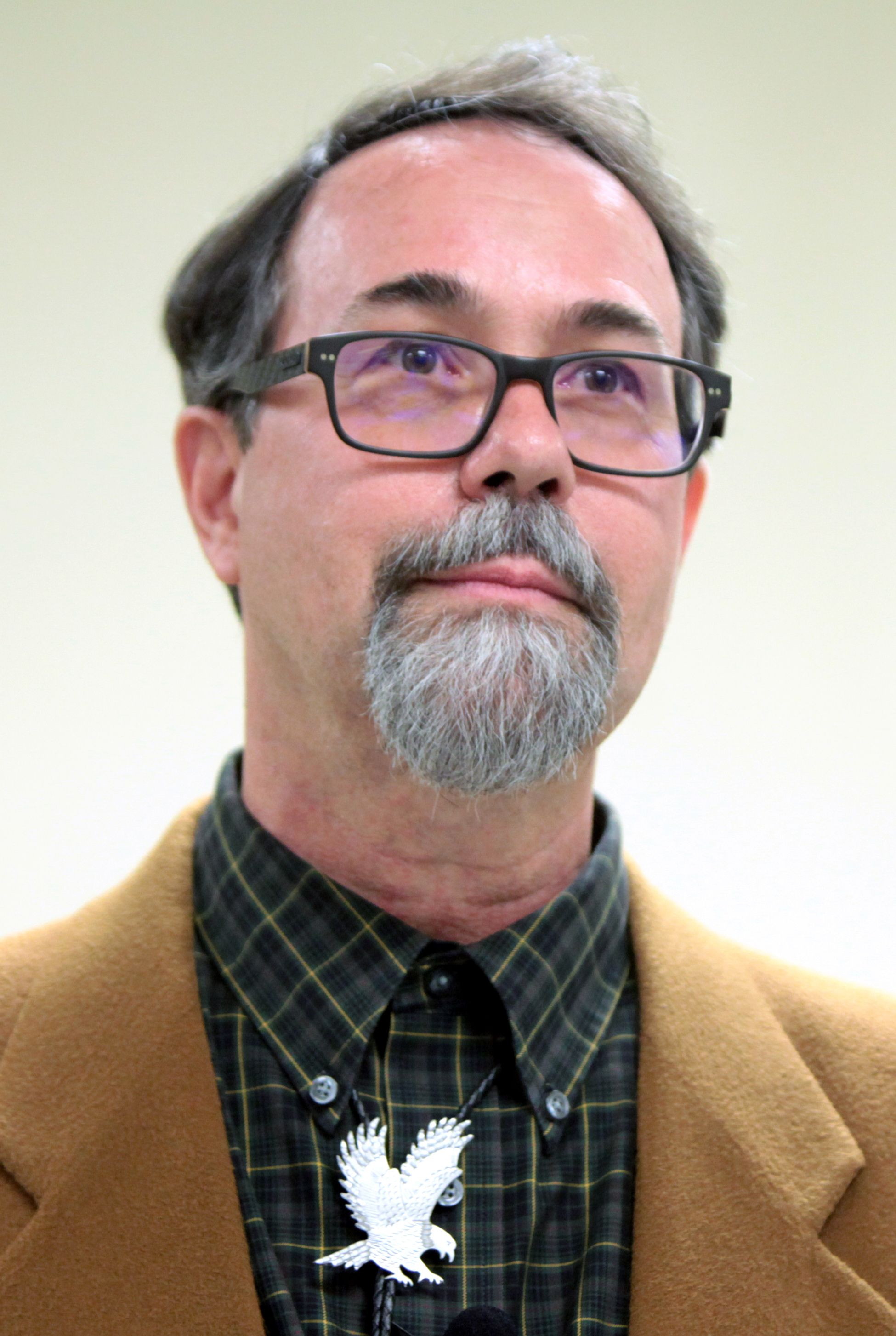
Kent Mesplay of California, California Delegate to the Green National Committee

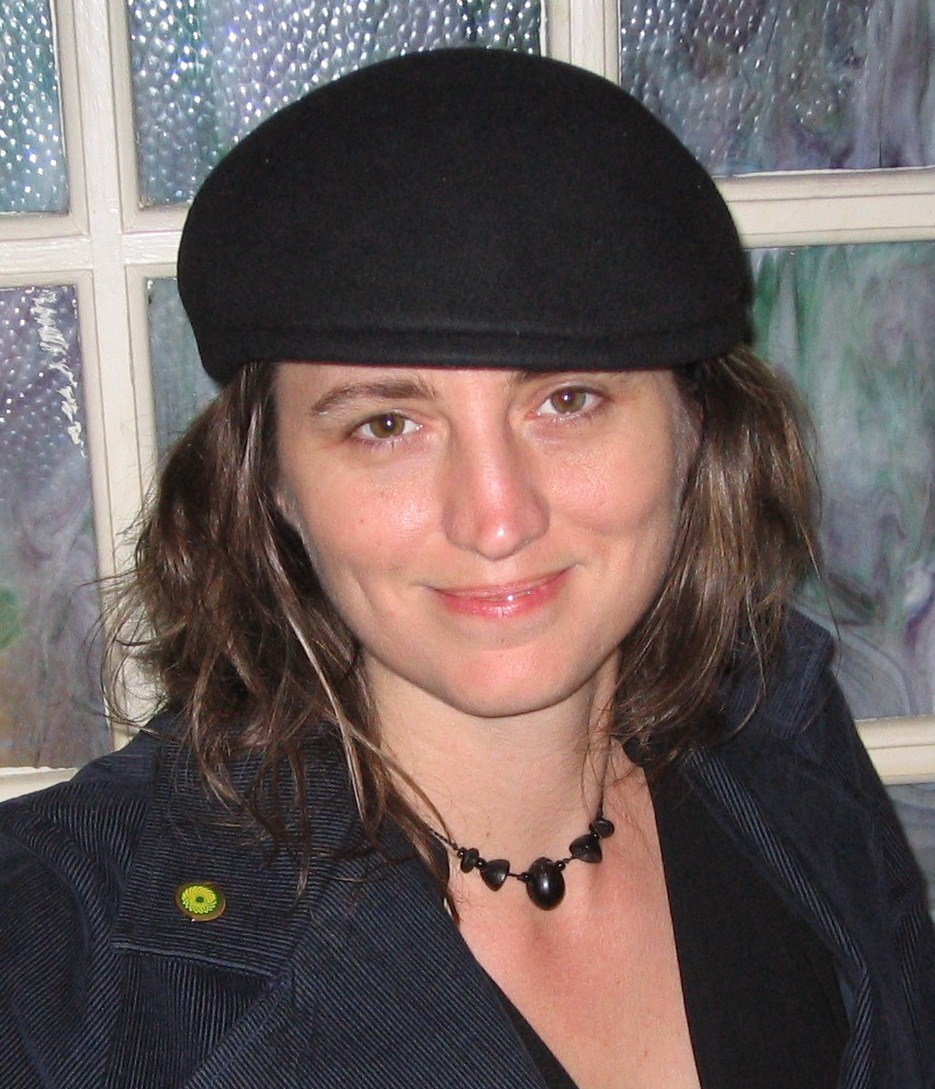
Kat Swift of Texas, co-chair of Texas Green Party

=== Balloting ===
Candidate	Green National Convention Presidential roll call vote	Percentage
Cynthia McKinney	324	59.89%
Ralph Nader^{3}	85½	15.80%
Kat Swift	38½	7.12%
Kent Mesplay	35	6.47%
Jesse Johnson	32½	6.01%
Elaine Brown	9	1.66%
Jared Ball^{4}	8	1.48%
No candidate	6½	1.20%
Uncommitted	2	0.37%
Total	541	100%
Notes:^{1} "2008 Green Party Presidential Nomination Delegate Count". GPUS. July 3, 2008.^{2} "2008 Presidential Convention Ballot Results". GPUS. July 2008.^{3} Nader did not seek the Green Party nomination. His total includes 8 delegates from Illinois where Howie Hawkins stood on the ballot in his place.^{4} Endorsed Cynthia McKinney.

Green presidential nomination ballot
Delegation	Cynthia McKinney	Ralph Nader	Kat Swift	Kent Mesplay	Jesse Johnson	Elaine Brown	Jared Ball	Other
Arizona	6	0	0	1	1	0	0	0
Arkansas	4	0	1	1	0	0	1	1
Black Caucus	2	0	0	0	0	0	0	0
California	23	52	3	2	1	4	1	0
Colorado	3	0	2	2	0	5	0	0
Connecticut	10	1	0	0	0	0	0	0
Delaware	6	0	0	0	0	0	0	0
Washington, D.C.	13	1	1	0	0	0	1	0
Florida	11	2	2	1	0	0	0	0
Georgia	7	0	1	0	0	0	0	0
Hawaii	5	3	0	0	0	0	0	0
Illinois	25	8	0	6	0	0	5	0
Indiana	6.5	0	0	1.5	0	0	0	0
Iowa	3	0	2	1	1	0	0	1
Lavender Caucus	4	0	0	0	0	0	0	0
Louisiana	5	1	0	0	0	0	0	0
Maine	15	0	1	0.5	1.5	0	0	0
Maryland	6	0	3	3	4	0	0	0
Massachusetts	13	3	1	3	1	0	0	0
Michigan	17	4	1	1	1	0	0	0
Minnesota	11	0	0	0	0	0	0	1
Mississippi	4	0	2	2	0	0	0	0
Missouri	5	0	1	0	2	0	0	0
Montana	1	0	0	1	0	0	0	0
Nebraska	8	0	0	0	0	0	0	0
New Jersey	6	1	0	1	1	0	0	1
New York	28.5	2.5	0	2	3	0	0	0
North Carolina	5	0	0	1	2	0	0	0
Ohio	3	1	0	0	1	0	0	1
Oregon	9	0	0	0	1	0	0	0
Pennsylvania	10	2	0.5	1	2	0	0	2.5
Rhode Island	5	0	0	0	1	0	0	0
South Carolina	1	0	1	0	0	0	0	0
Tennessee	5	0	1	1	1	0	0	0
Texas	1	0	10	0	1	0	0	0
Utah	2	0	0	0	0	0	0	0
Virginia	2	3	1	0	1	0	0	1
Washington	10	0	1	1	0	0	0	0
West Virginia	2	0	0	0	6	0	0	0
Wisconsin	19	1	1	2	0	0	0	1
Women's Caucus	2	0	2	0	0	0	0	0
Total delegates	324	85.5	38.5	35	32.5	9	8	8.5

=== Running mate ===
After McKinney's nomination, the convention delegates selected her stated choice of running mate, Rosa Clemente, for the vice-presidential nomination through a voice vote of delegates.

== Video of Convention ==
- State Delegate voting part 1
- State Delegate voting part 2
- Cynthia McKinney Acceptance Speech
- Vote and Rosa Clemente Acceptance Speech
- David Cobb Convention Speech
- Malik Rahim Keynote Speech
- Omar López Keynote Speech
- Malik Rahim congressional candidate Louisiana
- Jesse Johnson addresses Convention Delegates
