= Political party committee =

In the United States, a political party committee is an organization, officially affiliated with a political party and registered with the Federal Election Commission (FEC), which raises and spends money for political campaigning. Political party committees are distinct from political action committees, which are formally independent of political parties and subject to different rules.

Though their own internal rules differ, the two major political parties (Democrats and Republicans) have essentially parallel sets of committees; third parties have more varied organizational structures.

== National committees ==
The Democratic National Committee (DNC), Reform Party National Committee, Green National Committee, Libertarian National Committee, and Republican National Committee (RNC) are the official central organizations for their respective parties. They have the greatest role in presidential election years when they are responsible for planning the nominating convention.

The DNC and RNC were founded in 1848 and 1854, respectively. For much of their histories, the committees consisted of federated state organizations that came together every four years to organize a convention and support a national ticket, but did very little business outside of presidential years. The two committees did not have permanent staff or headquarters in Washington, DC until the early 1900s; Republicans opened their first headquarters in 1918, and Democrats followed in 1929. Beginning in the late 1970s, national party committees, including congressional committees, massively expanded their financial resources, hired larger staffs, and became more active in campaigns.

Party committees spend heavily in support of their party's nominees. Spending by national party committees includes contributions directly to candidate campaigns, expenditures coordinated with nominated candidate campaigns, independent expenditures, and transfers to state or local party committees. National party expenditures may directly support a federal candidate, but may also fund general party building activities, like a voter registration drive that would help all candidates on a party's ticket in that area.

=== Hill committee ===
The two major parties also have two national Hill committees, controlled by their caucus leadership in each house of Congress, which work specifically to elect members of their own party to the United States Congress. "Hill" refers to Capitol Hill, where the seat of Congress, the Capitol, is located. The four major committees are part of the Democratic and Republican parties and each work to help members of their party get elected to their respective chamber, the House of Representatives or the Senate.

The four major committees are the:

- Democratic Congressional Campaign Committee (DCCC; commonly pronounced "D-triple-C")
- National Republican Congressional Committee (NRCC)
- Democratic Senatorial Campaign Committee (DSCC)
- National Republican Senatorial Committee (NRSC)

Two third parties have Hill committees as well: The Libertarian National Congressional Committee (LNCC) for the Libertarian Party and the Green Senatorial Campaign Committee (GSCC) for the Green Party of the United States.

==== Purpose ====
The goal of these committees is to maximize the number of seats under their party's control in a given chamber and to support incumbent members of their caucuses. To advance those goals, the committees spend the bulk of their resources on the closest, most competitive campaigns that are most likely to flip in party control. Researcher Paul Herrnson called these competitive districts "opportunity races." In addition to opportunity, committees factor campaign and candidate quality, incumbency, and regional goals when weighing spending decisions.

Each committee works to recruit, assist, and support candidates of their own party, for their own chamber, in targeted races around the country. The committees contribute directly to candidates' campaigns, while also providing campaign-related services that require specialized skills or expertise, like research or targeting. Committees additionally make independent expenditures in support of candidates.

Party committees act as hubs of information, sharing information, strategies, and tactics between connected organizations and allies. For example, party committees may share information about candidates in targeted elections in order to encourage members of the existing caucuses and allied organizations to endorse or donate to their campaign.

Hill committee chairs of the major parties are historically incumbents of each body. As of 2023, the chairs of the DCCC and DSCC are appointed by the party leader, while the chairs of the NRCC and NRSC are voted on by their conference. Typically, they are proven fundraisers with national political ambitions. The committees are run on a day-to-day basis by a professional staff with campaign experience.

=== Fundraising ===
Party committees raise funds at the national level from donors whose focus is on Congress as a whole, rather than individual campaigns. Raising large contributions from national donors for their respective party committees is a major responsibility of party leadership.

The majority of funds for party committees is raised from individual donors. The individual contribution limit to a single national party committee is indexed to inflation and increases in odd-numbered years. As of 2023, the individual contribution limit was $41,300 per calendar year.

Party committees additionally raise money from small donors, usually defined as individuals contributing of less than $200, the point at which the FEC requires a donors full name to be listed on fundraising reports. PACs, representing interest groups, industries, or businesses, also provide a major source of funds for party committees.

Additionally, the Hill committees rely on "dues" paid by existing members of each party's caucuses. Candidates can make unlimited transfers from personal campaign committees to party organizations, as well as a maximum contribution from any leadership PAC account. In the 2006 election cycle, contributions from members of Congress campaign committees and leadership PACs accounted for 8% of receipts collected by Republican party committees and 11% of receipts by Democratic party committees.

== State and local committees ==
Prior to the 1950s, many state and local party committees were a source of patronage jobs, but civil service reforms led to the decline of those systems. During the 1970s and 1980s, state party committees shifted toward professionalized operations mirroring national party committees, concentrating on fundraising and campaign services.

State party organizations typically have both federal and non-federal accounts, and money can be transferred between the two under certain circumstances. (A third and more complicated category of money, Levin funds, has been created by the Bipartisan Campaign Reform Act.) As of 2023, the federal limit for individual contributions to a state and related local party committees is $10,000 per year. Though the amount an individual can give to both the national and state party organizations are limited, there are no limits to how much state parties can transfer to their partner national parties. Campaign finance watchdogs have criticized transfers between state and national party committees for creating loopholes to avoid contribution limits.

In many states, legislative campaign committees or assembly campaign committees are operated by political parties in order to raise funds and campaign for the election of party members to the state legislatures. Similar to federal party committees, these organizations recruit candidates and pool resources, staff, and expertise in order to run more effective campaigns. These are federated under such national organizations as the Democratic Legislative Campaign Committee (formed in 1994) and Republican State Leadership Committee (formed in 2002).

== See also ==
- Politics of the United States
- Independent expenditure committee
