= Ellen Brown =

American author, attorney and public speaker

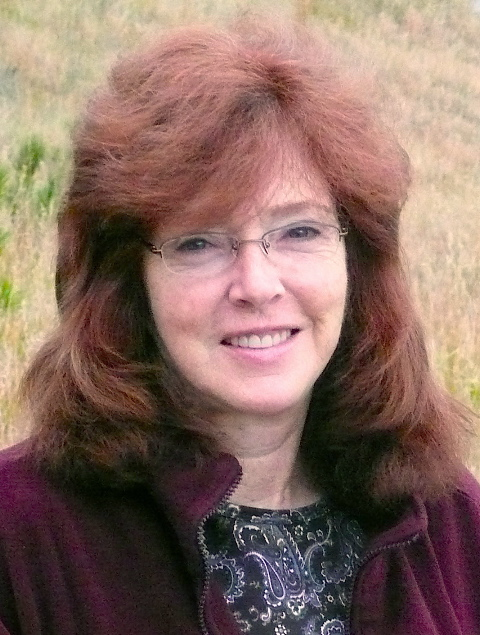
- Born: September 15, 1945 (age 80); Pleasanton, California, U.S.
- Occupations: author, activist, attorney
- Writing career
- Genres: nonfiction, economics, medicine, public policy
- Notable works: Web of Debt, The Public Bank Solution
- Website: ellenbrown.com

Ellen Hodgson Brown (born September 15, 1945) is an American author, attorney, public speaker, and advocate of alternative medicine and financial reform, most prominently public banking. Brown is the founder and president of the Public Banking Institute, a nonpartisan think tank devoted to the creation of publicly run banks. She has appeared on cable and network television, radio, and internet programs and podcasts. She ran for California Treasurer in the California June 2014 Statewide Primary election.

== Life and career ==
She attended law school at the University of California, Los Angeles, where she was Book Review Editor of the UCLA Law Review and obtained her J.D. in January 1978. Her law review article, "Restrictions on Alternative Medical Practitioners in California: A Legal and Economic Analysis," published in the UCLA Law Review in 1977, was cited in the dissenting opinion in People v. Privitera, 23 Cal.3d 697 (Cal. 1979) by California Supreme Court Chief Justice Rose Bird, who called it "an excellent and exhaustive review of case and statutory law" on alternative medicine.

Brown was a civil litigation attorney in Los Angeles for ten years.

In 2011, Brown founded the Public Banking Institute (PBI) to promote research and advocacy of public banks. In 2013, Brown published The Public Bank Solution, revisiting her arguments in Web of Debt, tracing the history of public banking, and discussing various options to implement it in the contemporary economy. She was chairman of the Public Banking Institute for most of the years from 2011 until 2025, when she retired.

In October, 2013, her opinion piece on public banking, "Public Banks are Key to Capitalism", appeared in The New York Times.

In 2013, Brown announced her candidacy for California State Treasurer on the Green Party ticket in the 2014 election. On December 27, 2013, the Green Party of California endorsed Brown's candidacy. Brown received 6.5% of the vote during the June primaries, putting her in third place among three candidates, and thus not qualifying her for the general election due to California's "top two" primary system.

== Books ==
- 1990:With the Grain: Eat More, Weigh Less, Live Longer (1990). Carroll & Graf Pubs. 1990. ISBN 978-0881845730.
- 1990:The Informed Consumer's Pharmacy with Dr. Lynne Walker. Carroll & Graf Pubs. 1990. ISBN 978-0881845860.
- 1994:Menopause and Estrogen: Natural Alternatives to Hormone Replacement Therapy (formerly Breezing through the Change: Managing Menopause Naturally) (with Dr. Lynne Walker). Frog Books. 1996. ISBN 978-1883319533.
- 1998:Brown, Ellen Hodgson (March 2008). Forbidden Medicine: Is Safe, Non-Toxic Cancer Treatment Being Suppressed? (1998). ISBN 978-0979560835.
- 1998:The Alternative Pharmacy: Break the Drug Cycle with Safe Natural Treatments for 200 Everyday Ailments (with Dr. Lynne Walker). Prentice Hall Pr. 1998. ISBN 978-0735200210.
- 1998:Brown, Ellen Hodgson; Hansen, Richard T. (1998). The Key to Ultimate Health' (with Richard Hansen) (1998). Advanced Health Research Pub. ISBN 978-1879854253.
- 2001:Brown, Ellen Hodgson (2001). Healing Joint Pain Naturally' (2001). Harmony/Rodale. ISBN 978-0767905619.
- 2002:Nature's Pharmacy for Children by Lynne Paige Walker, Ellen Hodgson Brown, Lendon Smith M.D. Three Rivers Press. 2002. ISBN 978-0609806647.
- 2003:A Woman's Complete Guide to Natural Health by Lynne Paige Walker and Ellen Hodgson Brown. Third Millennium Press. 2003. ISBN 1583331557.
- 2007:Web of Debt: The Shocking Truth about Our Money System and How We Can Break Free. Third Millennium Press. 2013. ISBN 978-0983330868.
- 2013:The Public Bank Solution: From Austerity to Prosperity. Third Millennium Press. 2009. ISBN 978-1-58243-535-0.
