= Green National Convention =

Nominating meetings of the US Green Party

The Green National Convention is the presidential nominating convention of the Green Party of the United States (GPUS). Though the Green National Committee (GNC) meets annually in a "national meeting", the convention is convened by the GNC once every four years in order to nominate an official candidate in the upcoming U.S. presidential election, and to officially adopt the party platform and rules for the election cycle.

The convention signals the end of the primary season for Greens, and the start of campaigning for the general election of that year; as such, prominent Greens in state and local races are also spotlighted in order to give them the publicity that the convention affords. In contrast to the Republican and Democratic National Conventions, the convention is not merely a formality which endorses the will of the electorate in the primaries, but the final determinant for the nomination. This is because ballot access laws in many states prohibit the Green Party from holding a state-sponsored primary election—only five states were able to meet the requirements in 2004—and others prevent voters from actually registering into the party, thus making it difficult to credential Greens.

== History ==
The leadership of the first nationwide Green organization in the United States, The Greens/Green Party USA (G/GPUSA), were generally opposed to an entry into electoral politics. Thus, the G/GPUSA's national meeting in Albuquerque, New Mexico, in 1995 ended with a resolution not to nominate a candidate for the 1996 election. This resolution was countered by a group of Greens interested in a run by consumer advocate Ralph Nader, who met in Los Angeles in 1996 to nominate Nader for president and Winona LaDuke for vice president. Although possibly lacking official sanction, this was the first nominating convention of the Green Party in the United States, and the only one with which the G/GPUSA, if only certain members, was at all involved.

Following the general election in 1996, several state Green Parties formed the Association of State Green Parties (ASGP). As such, they met in Denver, Colorado, in 2000 to once again nominate Nader and LaDuke.

In 2001, the ASGP formally adopted the name Green Party of the United States, and was recognized by the Federal Election Commission as the official National Committee of the Green Party. The first convention under that name, in Milwaukee, Wisconsin, in 2004, was not without controversy. Nader decided to forgo the Green nomination in favor of asking for an "endorsement" of his independent candidacy; the Greens instead nominated David Cobb for president on the second ballot from among a number of candidates, many of whom were "favorite sons", running as placeholders for Nader. Pat LaMarche was named the vice presidential candidate.

== List of Green conventions ==
The following is a list of United States Green Party presidential nominating conventions.

Green conventions by year, with dates, location and nominees
Year	Dates	Location	Nomination venue	Presidential nominee	Vice presidential nominee
1996^{1}	August 19	Los Angeles	Freud Playhouse	Ralph Nader of Connecticut	Winona LaDuke of Minnesota
2000^{2}	June 24–25	Denver	Renaissance Denver Stapleton Hotel	Ralph Nader of Connecticut	Winona LaDuke of Minnesota
2004	June 23–28	Milwaukee	Midwest Airlines Center	David K. Cobb of California	Patricia H. LaMarche of Maine
2008	July 10–13	Chicago	Symphony Center	Cynthia McKinney of Georgia	Rosa Clemente of New York
2012	July 12–15	Baltimore	Holiday Inn Baltimore-Inner Harbor (Dwtn)	Jill Stein of Massachusetts	Cheri Honkala of Pennsylvania
2016	August 4–7	Houston	University of Houston	Jill Stein of Massachusetts	Ajamu Baraka of Illinois
2020	July 9–12	n/a	Online	Howie Hawkins of New York	Angela Walker of South Carolina
2024	August 15-18	n/a	Online	Jill Stein of Massachusetts	Butch Ware of California

^{1} The 1996 meeting was not an official meeting of The Greens/Green Party USA, which had officially voted to nominate no candidate in Albuquerque in 1995.
^{2} Convened by the Association of State Green Parties, later to be renamed the Green Party of the United States.

== Other national meetings ==
In addition to the presidential nominating convention, there is a national meeting in all other years for the party. During the era of the Association of State Green Parties, separate annual meetings were held in the same year of presidential conventions. Since 2004, the presidential convention has consolidated annual meetings during presidential election years.

=== Green Party of the United States ===
Meetings of GPUS
Year	Location	Site	Notes
2020	Presidential nominating convention		
2019	Salem, Massachusetts	Salem State University	Theme: "Change Comes from the Roots"
2018	Salt Lake City, Utah	University of Utah	Slogan: "UTAH! – Power Up Green!"
2017	Newark, New Jersey	New Jersey Institute of Technology	
2016	Presidential nominating convention		
2015	St. Louis, Missouri	University of Missouri–St. Louis	
2014	St. Paul, Minnesota	Macalester College	
2013	Iowa City, Iowa	University of Iowa	
2012	Presidential nominating convention		
2011	Alfred, New York	Alfred University	Theme: "Building a Green Economy"
2010	Detroit, Michigan	Wayne State University	Theme: "Another U.S. Is Possible, Another Party Is Necessary"
2009	Durham, North Carolina	North Carolina Central University	
2008	Presidential nominating convention		
2007	Reading, Pennsylvania	Abraham Lincoln Hotel	Theme: "Green For A Change"
2006	Tucson, Arizona	Historic YWCA Building	Theme: "El Futuro es Verde -- The Future is Green"
2005	Tulsa, Oklahoma	University of Tulsa	
2004	Presidential nominating convention		
2003	Washington, D.C.	Mayflower Hotel	Theme: "Greens at the Crossroads"
2002	Philadelphia, Pennsylvania	[data missing]	Midterm convention
2001	Santa Barbara, California	La Casa de Maria, Interfaith Retreat	Founding meeting of GPUS

=== Association of State Green Parties ===
Meetings of ASGP
Year	Location	Site	Notes
2000	Hiawassee, Georgia	Enota Retreat & Conference Center	Post-election meeting
1999	Moodus, Connecticut	Sunrise Resort State Park	Ralph Nader, speaker and 1996 nominee
1998	Santa Fe, New Mexico	[data missing]	Keynote speakers: Fran Sena Gallegos, Santa Fe Municipal Judge; Jason Kirkpatrick, vice mayor of Arcata, CA
1997 (Oct.)	Topsham, Maine	Topsham Grange Hall	
1997 (Apr.)	Portland, Oregon	[data missing]	Delegates from 13 states plus D.C.
1996	Middleburg, Virginia	Glen-Ora Farm	Founding meeting of ASGP

== See also ==
- Green National Committee
- Democratic National Convention
- Libertarian National Convention
- Republican National Convention
- List of conventions of the Democratic Socialists of America
