= Kent Warner Smith =

California political activist (1941–2008)

Kent Warner Smith (June 16, 1941 – February 18, 2008) was an American political activist, university lecturer, and one of the founders of the Green Party of California. He served as state chairman of the California Greens in the 1990s.

== Early life and education ==
Smith was born in San Jose, California. He attended Stanford University, where he worked on The Stanford Daily newspaper and played soccer, earning his bachelor's degree in history in 1963. He earned a PhD in diplomatic history at University of California, Berkeley in 1972.

He was a professor at several California universities, before giving up his academic career in 1988 to build his own cabin in the woods near Grass Valley where he became president of the local FCAT TV station producing and hosting several programs such as The Emerging Golden Age, The News Hour and the Monty Python-like comedy Mid Realities with friend Jerry Martin.

== Political career ==
In 1971-73, Smith was field secretary of the War Resisters League/West, an American secular pacifist organization, working with Ira Sandperl, Roy Kepler and others. He was also academic coordinator for the Peace Studies program at Stanford in the mid 1970s.

Smith participated in the first state meeting of the Greens in Fresno in 1989, alongside approximately 25 others. Smith went on to play a key role in organizing a 1990 meeting in Sacramento, where the Greens resolved to establish the official Green Party of California.

In 1992, after the fledgling party had registered over 100,000 members, it was Mr. Smith who, in a historic moment for the party, accepted the state-sealed declaration from the Secretary of State on behalf of the Green Party. The Green Party of California became the first new political party to qualify in California in 20 years, and the second Green Party in the US (after Alaska).

Additionally, Mr. Smith was a pioneer in global Green communication. He played a crucial role in organizing the first Planetary Meeting of Greens in Rio de Janeiro in May 1992. He also facilitated cooperation between Green Parties in Canada, the US and Mexico., which led to the establishment of the Federation of Green Parties of the Americas.

The local Green Party rallied around Smith in support of his 1992 State Senate campaign in which Smith received more than 30,000 votes and 10% in his race. He ran in the 1st State Senate District in California, which extended from Mono Lake to the Oregon border. During the campaign, Smith told the Los Angeles Times that he was probably being outspent by other candidates, at a ratio of 100 to 1.

One of his final political endeavors was organizing Americans for Constitutional Integrity, a group committed to advocating for the impeachment of President George W. Bush. He co-authored the resolution, endorsed by the Green Party of California, that called for Bush's impeachment.

When hearing of Smith's passing, Natalia Escuedero, former vice-president of the Green Ecological Party of Mexico wrote, "Mission accomplished, Kent! You served your country, society and mother Earth throughout your life, demonstrating that you are a man of justice and order. You have left us an example to follow."
