= 2000 Green National Convention =

American political event

- 2000 presidential election

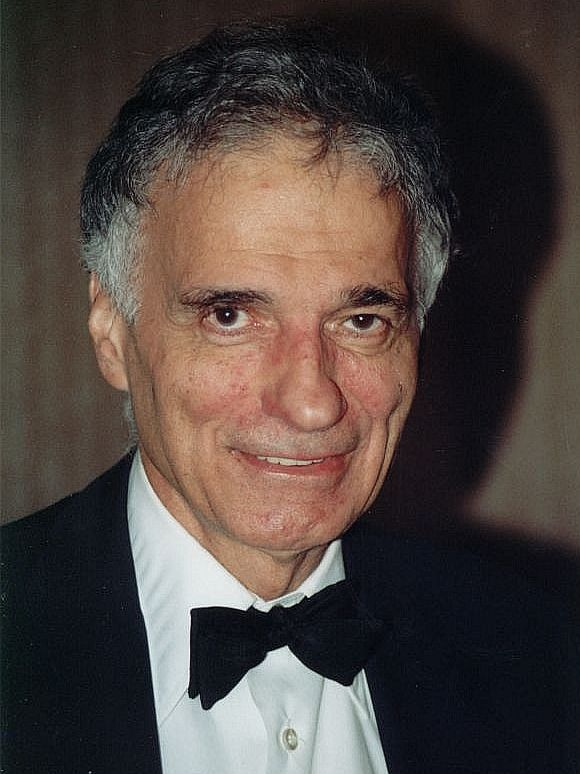
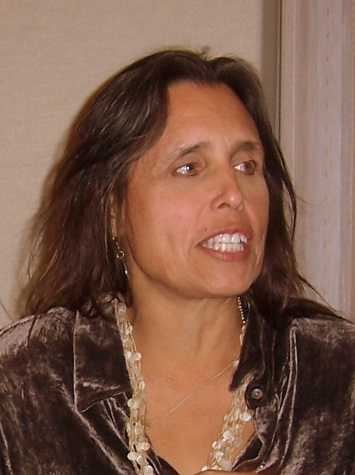
- Nominees (Nader & LaDuke)

Convention
- Date(s): July 23–25, 2000
- City: Denver, Colorado

Candidates
- Presidential nominee: Ralph Nader of Connecticut
- Vice-presidential nominee: Winona LaDuke of California

The 2000 Green National Convention was held on July 23–25, in Denver, Colorado. The convention was convened by the Association of State Green Parties, which was later to be renamed the Green Party of the United States. The convention nominated Ralph Nader for president and Winona LaDuke for vice president.

2000 Green National Convention presidential nomination
Candidate	Total votes cast	Percent of votes cast
Ralph Nader	295	92.5%
Jello Biafra	10	3.1%
Stephen Gaskin	10	3.1%
Joel Kovel	3	0.9%
Abstain	1	0.3%
Total	319	100%

2000 Green National Convention vice presidential nomination
Candidate	Vote	Result
Winona LaDuke	Unanimous	Nominated
Note: Nominated by acclamation following the presidential roll call.

== See also ==
- Green National Convention
- Other parties' presidential nominating conventions of 2000:
  - Libertarian
  - Democratic
  - Republican
