= Brent McMillan =

American politician

Brent McMillan (born December 22, 1958, in Indianapolis, Indiana) is the national executive director for the Green Party in the United States, working at the party's offices in Washington, D.C.

McMillan has served as the GPUS Political Director from February 11, 2004. A former Republican, McMillan first became involved in the Green Party in 1991 with the Delaware County Greens in Muncie, Indiana and served as secretary for the first statewide gathering of Greens in 1992. In 1996 he co-founded the Green Party of Seattle and served on the first coordinating council. In 1998 he co-founded the Green Party of the 36th District and served as its treasurer until 2004. In 2000 he co-founded the Green Party of Washington State and served as the first State Facilitator (Chair). In 2002 he was elected as one of two delegates to represent the state of Washington on the National Committee of the Green Party of the United States. In 2003 he was a candidate for the newly created Seattle Monorail Authority Board. McMillan finished third among seven candidates with 13,648 votes, 15.27%. During the campaign he was endorsed by the Seattle Post-Intelligencer and the Seattle Weekly. He received a BS and a BArch from Ball State University.

On January 1, 2009, he was promoted to executive director of the Green Party of the United States.
