= Jim Carr (education) =

American entrepreneur

- Born: December 20, 1969 (age 55); Rochester, Michigan, U.S. (United States)
- Occupation(s): Digital strategist, Online producer, entrepreneur

Jim Carr (born December 20, 1969) is vice president and head of digital media for Standard Media Group LLC, a broadcast and digital media company headquartered in Nashville, Tennessee. Carr was previously vice president of digital media for Media General, Inc., a publicly traded broadcast and digital media company headquartered in Richmond, Virginia. An advocate for digital literacy, Carr serves on the board of directors for the Digital Literacy Institute, a non-profit organization that works to bridge the digital divide and promote access to Internet technologies for under-served populations.

== Life and career ==
During the Tech boom of the 1990s Carr was co-founder and Chief Technologist of TechTrain, Inc.; an Atlanta-based Microsoft partner with technology training centers throughout the Southeastern United States. Carr has been an adjunct instructor, guest lecturer and advisor for a number of academic institutions including Queens College, Guilford College, the University of Alabama at Birmingham, the University of Tennessee at Chattanooga, and the College of Charleston. He was also an editor for AOL and Senior Managing Editor of act.com.

Working with the Maricopa Community College District from 2003 to 2006, Carr was director of instructional technology & new media and taught business & technology courses at their GateWay campus. In 2007, he was named director of digital media for Belo Corporation's Arizona television group where he oversaw digital operations for 3TV Phoenix and azfamily.com. In 2012 Carr joined Young Broadcasting as vice president of digital media which now operates as Media General, Inc. after a reverse acquisition in November 2013.

Carr is a Microsoft Certified Professional, Certified Internet Specialist, and an evangelist for open source software issues. He is a regular contributor to a number of print an online magazines and lectures on popular Web concepts including information architecture, Web usability, search engine optimization, social networking and Internet marketing. In April 2006 Carr was named a Roundtable Scholar by The Roundtable Group, an academic think-tank and speakers bureau. He is active in a number of professional organizations, including the Web Innovator's Group, the Information Architecture Institute, and Arizona Internet Professionals Association.
