= Green National Committee =

Top institution of the U.S. Green Party

- Green Party Logo
- Founded: 2001; 25 years ago
- Headquarters: 6411 Orchard Avenue, Suite 101; Takoma Park, MD 20912, U.S.
- Key people: Seven National Co-chairs (Collective Leadership); Kristen Combs (Secretary); Hillary Kane (Treasurer)
- Website: Committee Website

The Green National Committee (GNC) is the central governing body of the Green Party of the United States. The committee is composed of over 150 delegates from every affiliated state party and recognized caucus. The GNC oversees all national party functions and elects a steering committee to oversee day-to-day operations.

Responsibilities of the committee include organizing annual meetings and the presidential nominating convention, developing a party platform, and coordinating campaigns from the local, state, and federal levels.

== National Committee ==
The Green National Committee (GNC) serves as the decision-making body of the Green Party of the United States. It consists of 150 (+10) delegates, with additional delegates for party caucuses.

The delegates serving on the GNC are not synonymous to the presidential nominating delegates elected to the Green National Convention (also known as GNC) of which consists greater than 2.5 times the number of delegates.

2019 Delegate Apportionment

- Alabama 2
- Alaska 2
- Arizona 2
- Arkansas 2
- California 17
- Colorado 3
- Connecticut 5
- Delaware 2
- District of Columbia 2
- Florida 4
- Georgia (unaccredited)
- Hawaii 2
- Idaho (inactive)
- Illinois 11
- Indiana 2
- Iowa 2
- Kansas 2
- Kentucky 2
- Louisiana 2
- Maine 5
- Maryland 3
- Massachusetts 4
- Michigan 6
- Minnesota 2
- Mississippi 2
- Missouri 3
- Montana 2
- Nebraska 2
- Nevada 2
- New Hampshire (unaccredited)
- New Jersey 2
- New Mexico 2
- New York 9
- North Carolina 2
- North Dakota (unaccredited)
- Ohio 3
- Oklahoma 2
- Oregon 3
- Pennsylvania 4
- Rhode Island (unaccredited)
- South Carolina 2
- South Dakota (unaccredited)
- Tennessee 2
- Texas 10
- Utah 2
- Vermont (inactive)
- Virginia 2
- Washington 2
- West Virginia 2
- Wisconsin 2
- Wyoming (inactive)

Additional Delegates

- Black Caucus 2
- Latinx Caucus 2
- Lavender Caucus 2
- Women's Caucus 2
- Youth Caucus 2

== Steering committee ==
The steering committee is composed of seven co-chairs, acting as a collective executive, together with the secretary and treasurer. They are elected by the delegates who serve on the Green National Committee. The following are current and former officers of Green Party US.

National Co-chairs

- Ahmed Eltouny, New Jersey
- Christopher Stella, Louisiana
- Rei Stone-Grover, Michigan
- Garret Wasserman, Pennsylvania
- Margaret Elisabeth, Washington
- Tamar Yager, Virginia
- Anita Rios, Ohio

Secretary

- Kristen Combs, Pennsylvania

Treasurer

- Hillary Kane, Pennsylvania
List of GNC Co-chairs
- * Ahmed Eltouny, NJ: 2021-07 - present
- * Christopher Stella, LA: 2021-07 - present
- * Rei Stone-Grover, MI: 2021-07 - present
- * Garret Wasserman, PA: 2021-07 - present
- * Margaret Elisabeth, WA: 2020-07 - present
- * Tamar Yager, VA: 2011-03 - 2012-07; 2013-07 - 2017-07; 2020-07 - present
- * Anita Rios, OH: 2001-07 - 2004-07;2018-07 - present
- * Kristin Combs, PA: 2019-07 - 2021-07
- * Trahern Crews, MN: 2019-07 - 2021-07
- * Justin Beth, ME: 2018-07 - 2021-07
- * Tony Ndege, NC: 2018-07 - 2021-07
- * Gloria Mattera, NY: 2017-07 - 2021-07
- * Margaret Flowers, MD: 2018-07 - 2020-07
- * Violet Rose Zitola, CA: 2018-07 - 2019-07
- * Michael Dennis, Young Eco-Socialists (YES): 2017-07 - 2018-07
- * George Martin, WI: 2017-07 - 2018-07
- * Chris Blankenhorn, IL: 2016-08 - 2018-07
- * Darlene Elias, MA: 2016-08 - 2018-07
- * Darryl! Moch, DC: 2012-01 - 2015-07; 2016-08 - 2018-07
- * Bahram Zandi, MD: 2015-07 - 2017-07
- * Sanda Everette, CA: 2008-07 - 2010-06; 2015-07 - 2017-07
- * Andrea Mérida Cuéllar, CO: 2015-06 - 2019-07
- * Paul Pipkin, TX: 2016-01 - 2016-08
- * Audrey Clement, VA: 2011-03 - 2012-07; 2014-07 - 2016-08
- * Charles Ostdiek, NE: 2012-07 - 2016-08
- * Karen Young, NY: 2012-07 - 2016-01
- * Jesse Townley, CA: 2013-07 - 2015-07
- * Starlene Rankin, OR: 2013-07 - 2015-04
- * Katey Culver, TN: 2006-07 - 2007-07; 2013-09 - 2014-07
- * AJ Segneri, IL: 2012-07 - 2013-07
- * Steve Welzer, NJ: 2012-03 - 2013-07
- * Susan Chunco, CA: 2011-08 - 2013-07
- * Farheen Hakeem, MN: 2009-08 - 2013-07
- * Theresa El-Amin, NC: 2010-06 - 2012-07
- * Leenie Venet Halbert, AZ: 2011-03 - 2012-02
- * Mark Swaney, AR: 2011-08 - 2011-11
- * David Strand, MN: 2009-08 - 2011-08
- * Jason Nabewaniec, NY: 2007-07 - 2011-08
- * Julie Jacobson, HI: 2010-06 - 2011-01
- * Mike Feinstein, CA: 2009-08 - 2011-01
- * Craig Thorsen, CA: 2008-07 - 2011-01
- * Claudia Ellquist, AZ: 2010-04 - 2010-06
- * Jill Bussiere, WI: 2008-07 - 2010-03
- * Cliff Thornton, CT: 2007-11 - 2009-08
- * Phil Huckelberry, IL: 2007-07 - 2009-08
- * Budd Dickinson, CA: 2006-02 - 2009-08
- * Liz Arnone, NJ: 2006-07 - 2008-07
- * Jim Coplen, IN: 2006-07 - 2008-07
- * Sarah 'Echo' Steiner, FL: 2006-07 - 2008-07
- * Kristen Olson, MN: 2007-07 - 2007-10
- * Rebecca Rotzler, NY: 2005-07 - 2007-07
- * Steve Kramer, MD: 2005-04 - 2007-07
- * Jody Grage, WA: 2004-07 - 2006-07
- * Mark Sanson, IL: 2004-07 - 2006-07
- * Gwen Wages, MI: 2004-07 - 2006-07
- * Pat LaMarche, ME: 2005-07 - 2006-06
- * Peggy Lewis, CA: 2004-07 - 2005-07
- * Maya O'Connor, DC: 2004-07 - 2005-07
- * Jo Chamberlain, CA: 2001-07 - 2005-07
- * Gray Newman, NC: 2004-07 - 2005-04
- * Badili Jones, GA: 2002-07 - 2004-07
- * Ben Manski, WI: 2001-07 - 2004-07
- * Marnie Glickman, OR: 2003-07 - 2004-05
- * Barbara Payne, OR: 2002-07 - 2003-02
- * Tom Sevigny, CT: 2001-07 - 2002-07
List of GNC Secretaries
- * Kristin Combs, PA: 2021-07 - present
- * David Gerry, MA: 2019-07 - 2021-07
- * Jody Grage, WA: 2017-07 - 2019-07
- * Jan Martell, NC: 2015-07 - 2017-07
- * Budd Dickinson, WA: 2011-08 - 2015-07
- * Holly Hart, IA: 2005-07 - 2011-08
- * Greg Gerritt, RI: 2003-07 - 2005-07
- * Nathalie Paravicini, TX: 2001-07 - 2003-07
List of GNC Treasurers
- * Hillary Kane, PA: 2017-05 - present
- * Brian Bittner, MD: 2016-08 - 2017-05
- * Jeff Turner, HI: 2010-06 - 2016-08
- * Jody Grage, WA: 2006-07 - 2010-06
- * Jake Schneider, WI: 2002-07 - 2006-07
- * Robbie Franklin, TX: 2001-07 - 2002-07

== Standing committees ==
The GNC has several standing committees:

- Accreditation
- Animal Rights
- Annual National Meeting
- Ballot Access
- Bylaws, Rules, Policies & Procedures
- Communications
- Coordinated Campaign (Limited to 10 members)
- Dispute Resolution
- Diversity
- EcoAction
- Finance
- Fundraising
- Green Pages (newspaper editorial board)
- International
- Media
- Merchandising
- Outreach
- Peace Action
- Platform
- Presidential Campaign Support

=== Other committees ===
The following committees are effectively responsible for allocating and certifying delegates to the GNC:

- Apportionment Review (Limited to 8 members)
- Apportionment Tabulation (Limited to 7 members)
- Credentials (Limited to 15 members)

== Fundraising ==
The Green Senatorial Campaign Committee (GSCC) is the Federal Election Commission entity that the Coordinated Campaign Committee utilizes to support Green Party candidates from the senatorial down to the local level.

== See also ==
- Democratic National Committee
- Libertarian National Committee
- Republican National Committee
