= Democratic Senatorial Campaign Committee =

Democratic Party Hill committee

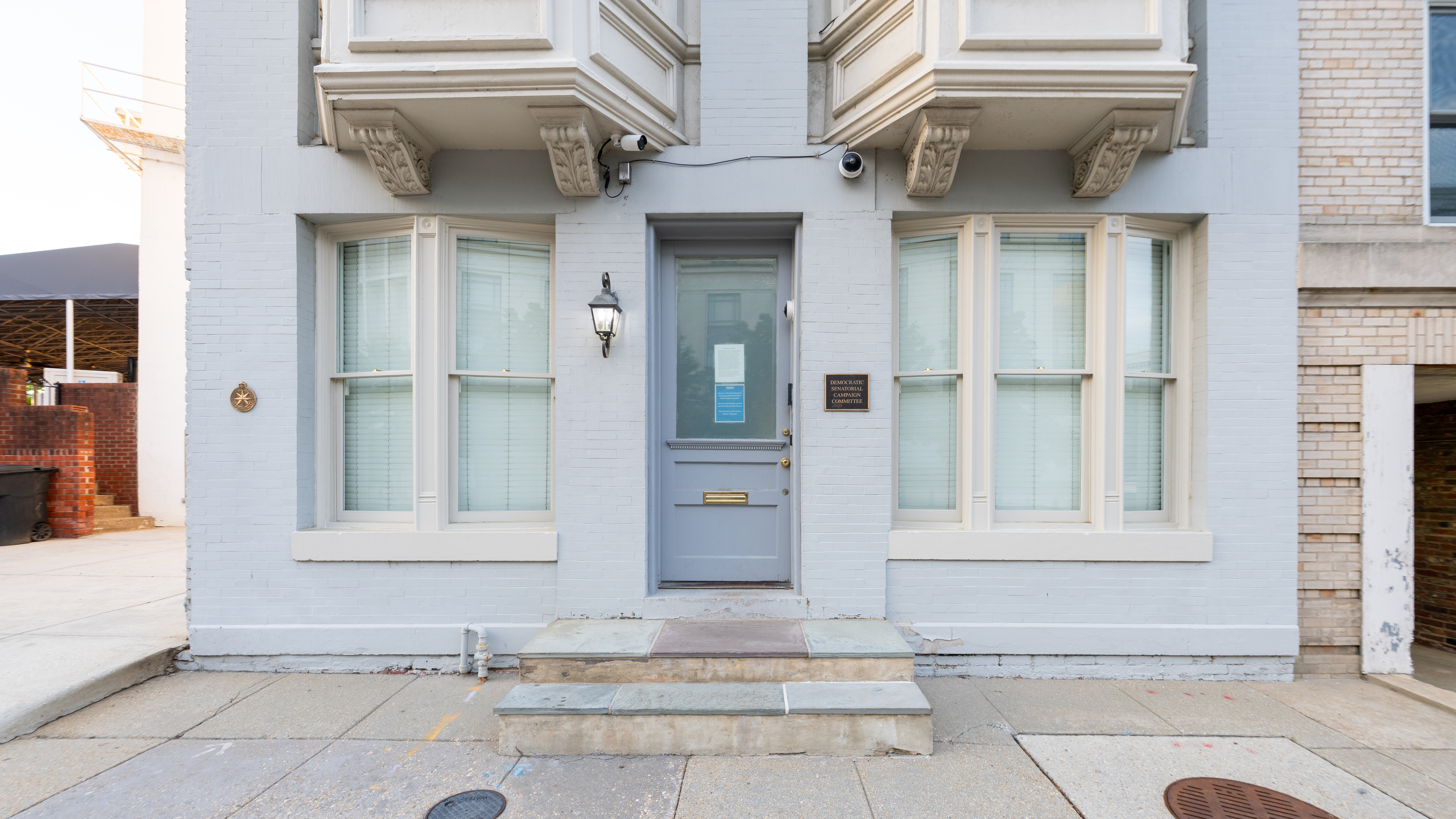
- DSCC headquarters in Washington, D.C, 2026
- Founded: 1916; 110 years ago
- Registration no.: C00042366
- Purpose: To elect Democrats to the United States Senate
- Location(s): 120 Maryland Ave. NE, Washington, D.C. 20002, United States
- Chair: Kirsten Gillibrand (NY)
- Vice Chairs: Mark Kelly (AZ); Adam Schiff (CA); Lisa Blunt Rochester (DE)
- Parent organization: Democratic Party
- Website: dscc.org

The Democratic Senatorial Campaign Committee (DSCC) is the Democratic Party Hill committee for the United States Senate. Its purpose is to elect Democrats to the Senate. The DSCC's current chair is Senator Kirsten Gillibrand of New York, who succeeded Gary Peters of Michigan after the 2024 Senate elections. DSCC's current executive director is Devan Barber.

== List of chairs and vice chairs ==
=== Chairs ===
Congress	Name	State	Term length
64th	Willard Saulsbury Jr.	DE	1916
65th	Vacant		
66th	Thomas J. Walsh	MT	1920–1922
67th	Thomas J. Walsh	MT	1920–1922
67th	David I. Walsh	MA	1922–1924
68th	David I. Walsh	MA	1922–1924
68th	Andrieus A. Jones	NM	1924–1926
69th	Andrieus A. Jones	NM	1924–1926
69th	Peter G. Gerry	RI	1926–1928
70th	Peter G. Gerry	RI	1926–1928
70th	Millard Tydings	MD	1928–1932
71st	Millard Tydings	MD	1928–1932
72nd	Millard Tydings	MD	1928–1932
72nd	Claude A. Swanson	VA	1932–1934
73rd	Claude A. Swanson	VA	1932–1934
73rd	J. Hamilton Lewis	IL	1934–1935
74th	Joseph F. Guffey	PA	Jan. 3, 1935 – Jan. 3, 1937
75th	Prentiss M. Brown	MI	Jan. 3, 1938 – Jan. 3, 1939
76th	Theodore F. Green	RI	Jan. 3, 1939 – Jan. 3, 1941
77th	Joseph F. Guffey	PA	Jan. 3, 1941 – Jan. 3, 1943
78th	Joseph C. O'Mahoney	WY	Jan. 3, 1943 – Jan. 3, 1947
79th	Joseph C. O'Mahoney	WY	Jan. 3, 1943 – Jan. 3, 1947
80th	Scott W. Lucas	IL	Jan. 3, 1947 – Jan. 3, 1949
81st	Clinton Anderson	NM	Jan. 3, 1949 – Jan. 3, 1953
82nd	Clinton Anderson	NM	Jan. 3, 1949 – Jan. 3, 1953
83rd	Earle Clements	KY	Jan. 3, 1953 – Jan. 3, 1957
84th	Earle Clements	KY	Jan. 3, 1953 – Jan. 3, 1957
85th	George Smathers	FL	Jan. 3, 1957 – Jan. 3, 1961
86th	George Smathers	FL	Jan. 3, 1957 – Jan. 3, 1961
87th	Vance Hartke	IN	Jan. 3, 1961 – Jan. 3, 1963
88th	Warren Magnuson	WA	Jan. 3, 1963 – Jan. 3, 1967
89th	Warren Magnuson	WA	Jan. 3, 1963 – Jan. 3, 1967
90th	Edmund Muskie	ME	Jan. 3, 1967 – Jan. 3, 1969
91st	Daniel Inouye	HI	Jan. 3, 1969 – Jan. 3, 1971
92nd	Fritz Hollings	SC	Jan. 3, 1971 – Jan. 3, 1973
93rd	Lloyd Bentsen	TX	Jan. 3, 1973 – Jan. 19, 1976
94th	Lloyd Bentsen	TX	Jan. 3, 1973 – Jan. 19, 1976
94th	J. Bennett Johnston	LA	Jan. 19, 1976 – Jan. 3, 1977
95th	Wendell Ford	KY	Jan. 3, 1977 – Jan. 3, 1983
96th	Wendell Ford	KY	Jan. 3, 1977 – Jan. 3, 1983
97th	Wendell Ford	KY	Jan. 3, 1977 – Jan. 3, 1983
98th	Lloyd Bentsen	TX	Jan. 3, 1983 – Jan. 3, 1985
99th	George Mitchell	ME	Jan. 3, 1985 – Jan. 3, 1987
100th	John Kerry	MA	Jan. 3, 1987 – Jan. 3, 1989
101st	John Breaux	LA	Jan. 3, 1989 – Jan. 3, 1991
102nd	Chuck Robb	VA	Jan. 3, 1991 – Jan. 3, 1993
103rd	Bob Graham	FL	Jan. 3, 1993 – Jan. 3, 1995
104th	Bob Kerrey	NE	Jan. 3, 1995 – Jan. 3, 1999
105th	Bob Kerrey	NE	Jan. 3, 1995 – Jan. 3, 1999
106th	Robert Torricelli	NJ	Jan. 3, 1999 – Jan. 3, 2001
107th	Patty Murray	WA	Jan. 3, 2001 – Jan. 3, 2003
108th	Jon Corzine	NJ	Jan. 3, 2003 – Jan. 3, 2005
109th	Chuck Schumer	NY	Jan. 3, 2005 – Jan. 3, 2009
110th	Chuck Schumer	NY	Jan. 3, 2005 – Jan. 3, 2009
111th	Bob Menendez	NJ	Jan. 3, 2009 – Jan. 3, 2011
112th	Patty Murray	WA	Jan. 3, 2011 – Jan. 3, 2013
113th	Michael Bennet	CO	Jan. 3, 2013 – Jan. 3, 2015
114th	Jon Tester	MT	Jan. 3, 2015 – Jan. 3, 2017
115th	Chris Van Hollen	MD	Jan. 3, 2017 – Jan. 3, 2019
116th	Catherine Cortez Masto	NV	Jan. 3, 2019 – Jan. 3, 2021
117th	Gary Peters	MI	Jan. 3, 2021 – Jan. 3, 2025
118th	Gary Peters	MI	Jan. 3, 2021 – Jan. 3, 2025
119th	Kirsten Gillibrand	NY	Jan. 3, 2025 – present

=== Vice chairs ===
Congress	Name	State	Term length
Position not established until 2023 at the start of the 118th Congress.
118th	Alex Padilla	CA	January 3, 2023 – January 3, 2025
118th	Tina Smith	MN	January 3, 2023 – January 3, 2025
119th	Mark Kelly	AZ	January 3, 2025 – present
119th	Adam Schiff	CA	January 3, 2025 – present
119th	Lisa Blunt Rochester	DE	January 3, 2025 – present

== Recent history ==
=== 2001–2002 election cycle ===
Patty Murray became the first female Chair of the DSCC in 2001. Her team raised more than $143 million, beating the previous record by $40 million. However, the Democratic Party lost two seats in the subsequent election which saw President George W. Bush become the first sitting president to take control of the Senate in a midterm election since 1914. This result may be attributed to George W. Bush's post-9/11 popularity and the death of Senator Paul Wellstone of Minnesota, who had been favored to win.

=== 2005–2006 election cycle ===
Chuck Schumer chaired the DSCC one of two consecutive cycles. Prior to the 2006 election, the Republican Party controlled 55 of 100 Senate seats. The Democratic Party performed well in the 2006 elections. No Congressional or gubernatorial seat held by a Democrat was won by a Republican. Six Republican incumbents were defeated by Democrats:

- Jim Talent (of Missouri) lost to Claire McCaskill
- Conrad Burns (of Montana) lost to Jon Tester
- Mike DeWine (of Ohio) lost to Sherrod Brown
- Rick Santorum (of Pennsylvania) lost to Bob Casey Jr.
- Lincoln Chafee (of Rhode Island) lost to Sheldon Whitehouse
- George Allen (of Virginia) lost to Jim Webb.

Incumbent Democrat Joe Lieberman (of Connecticut) lost the Democratic primary, but won reelection as an independent candidate. Democrats kept their two open seats in Minnesota and Maryland, and Republicans held onto their lone open seat in Tennessee. In Vermont, Bernie Sanders, an independent was elected to the seat left open by retiring Independent Jim Jeffords.

For the first time since 1954, neither major party held a majority of seats. However, the partisan balance for the Senate stood at 51–49 in favor of the Democrats, as Independent senators Bernie Sanders and Joe Lieberman caucused with them.

=== 2007–2008 election cycle ===
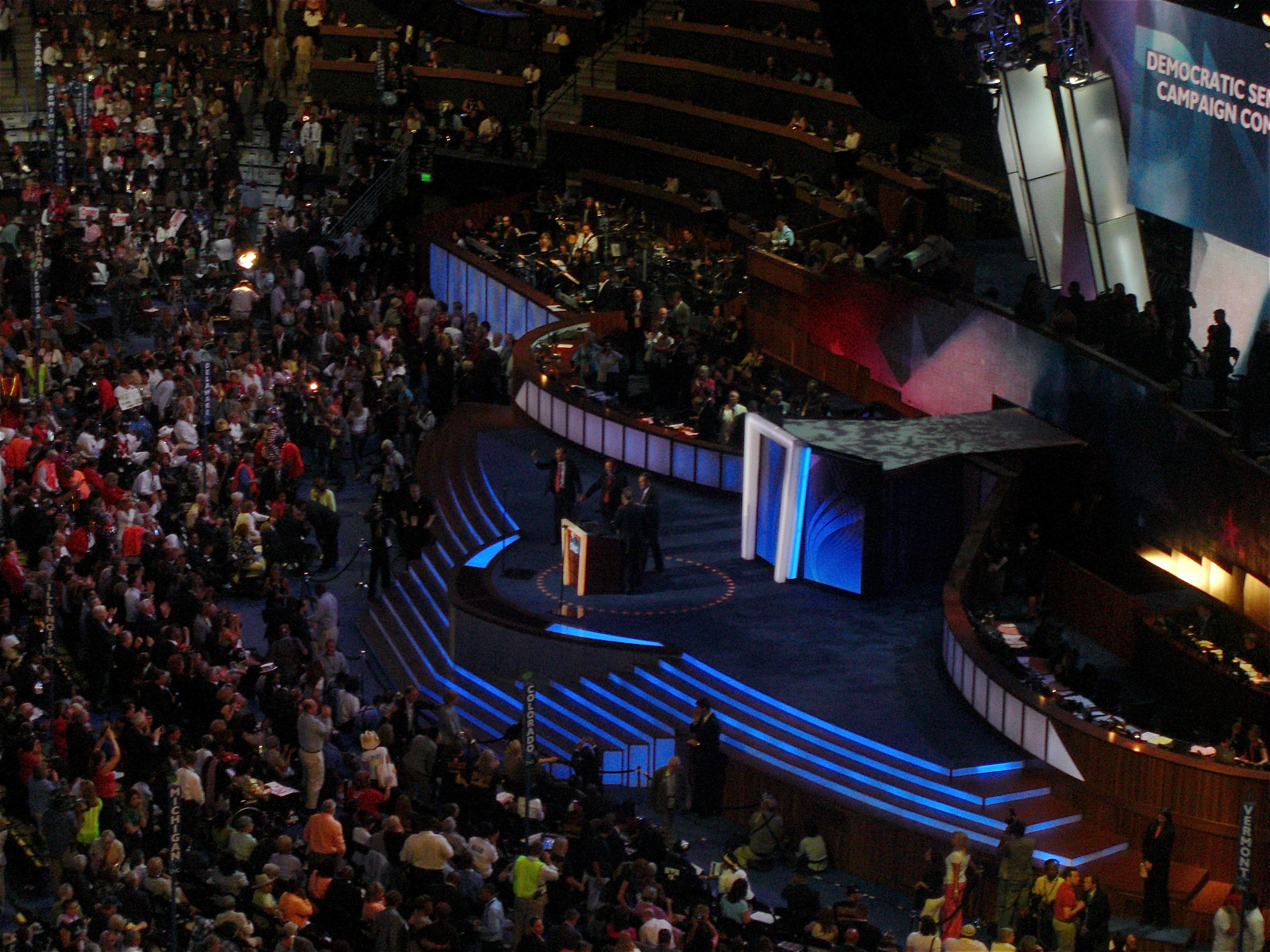
Chuck Schumer, flanked by Democratic Senate challengers, speaking during the third day of the 2008 Democratic National Convention in Denver, Colorado, in his capacity as Chair of the DSCC

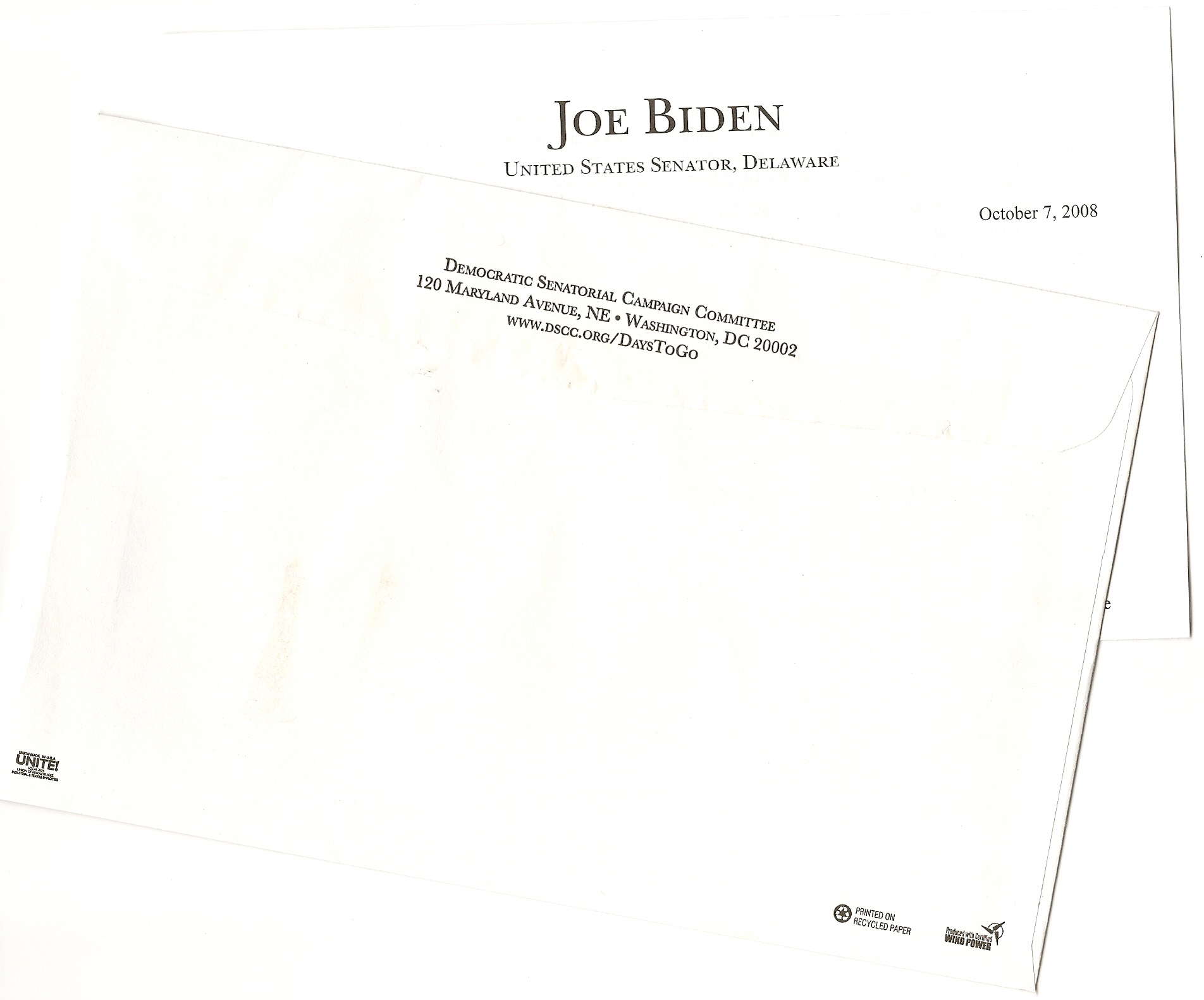
DSCC has long focused on direct mail fundraising; here, excerpts from a 2008 example with a plea from U.S. Senator and vice presidential candidate Joe Biden

Chuck Schumer chaired the DSCC for the second of two consecutive cycles. Heading into the 2008 election, the Senate consisted of 49 Democrats, 49 Republicans, and two independents (Bernie Sanders of Vermont and Joe Lieberman of Connecticut) who caucused with the Democrats, giving the Democratic caucus a de facto 51–49 majority. Of the seats up for election in 2008, 23 were held by Republicans and 12 by Democrats. The Republicans, who openly conceded early on that they wouldn't be able to recover the majority in 2008, lost eight seats. This election was the second successive cycle in which no seats switched from Democratic to Republican. In addition, this was the largest Democratic Senate gain since 1986, when they also won eight seats.

Democrats defeated five Republican incumbents:

- Ted Stevens (of Alaska) lost to Mark Begich
- Norm Coleman (of Minnesota) lost to Al Franken
- John Sununu (of New Hampshire) lost to Jeanne Shaheen
- Elizabeth Dole (of North Carolina) lost to Kay Hagan
- Gordon Smith (of Oregon) lost to Jeff Merkley

Democrats also picked up open seats in Colorado, New Mexico, and Virginia.

When the new Senate was first sworn in, the balance was 58–41 in favor of the Democrats, because of the unresolved Senate election in Minnesota. The defection of Republican Arlen Specter of Pennsylvania in April 2009 and the swearing-in of Al Franken in July 2009 brought the balance to 60–40.

=== 2011–2012 election cycle ===
In 2012, 23 Democratic Senate seats were available, as opposed to 10 Republican seats. An increase of four seats would have given the GOP a Senate majority. In the election, three GOP seats were won and one Democratic seat was lost, increasing the Democratic majority by two.

DSCC executive director said their strategy was to "localize" elections – make them "a choice between the two people on the ballot [...] and not simply allow it to be a nationalized election". Because this is not easy to do in a presidential election year, the DSCC had gone very much on the offensive, depicting Republican candidates and donors, and especially the Tea Party, as extreme. During the Florida and Indiana primaries, they pushed that the Tea Party was working to move the GOP "so far to the right that candidates will say anything to get their party's nomination". The GOP targeted four red states to pick up the seats they need for a Senate majority. They were looking at states that did not vote for President Obama in 2008: Missouri, Montana, Nebraska and North Dakota. They lost three of those four seats.

=== 2013–2014 election cycle ===
In 2014, 21 Democrats were up for election. In order to have a majority, the Republicans were required to attain at least 51 seats in the Senate. The Democrats would have been able to retain a majority with 48 seats (assuming the two Independents continued to caucus with them) because, in event of a tie vote, Vice President Joe Biden becomes the tie-breaker. Many of the incumbents were elected in the Democratic wave year of 2008 along with President Obama's first election.

Although Democrats saw some opportunities for pickups, the combination of Democratic retirements and numerous Democratic seats up for election in swing states and red states gave Republicans hopes of taking control of the Senate. 7 of the 21 states with Democratic seats up for election in 2014 had voted for Republican Mitt Romney in the 2012 presidential election. Democrats also faced the lower voter turnout that accompanies mid-term elections.

By midnight ET, most major networks projected that the Republicans would take control of the Senate. The party held all three competitive Republican-held seats (Kentucky, Kansas, and Georgia), and defeated incumbent Democrats in North Carolina, Colorado, and Arkansas. Combined with the pick-ups of open seats in Iowa, Montana, South Dakota, and West Virginia, the Republicans made a net gain of 7 seats before the end of the night. In the process of taking control of the Senate, Republicans defeated three incumbent Democrats, a task the party had not accomplished since the 1980 election. Five of the seven confirmed pickups were in states that voted for Mitt Romney in 2012, but two of the seats that Republicans won represent states that voted for Barack Obama in 2012 (Colorado and Iowa). Of the three races that were not called by the end of election night, Alaska and Virginia were still too close to call, while Louisiana held a December 6 run-off election. Incumbent Virginia Democrat Mark Warner was declared the winner of his race by a narrow margin over Republican Ed Gillespie on November 7, and Alaska Republican Dan Sullivan was declared the winner against Democratic incumbent Mark Begich a week later, on November 12. Republican Bill Cassidy defeated incumbent Democrat Mary Landrieu in the Louisiana runoff on December 6.

Days after the election, the United States Election Project estimated that 36.6% of eligible voters voted, 4% lower than the 2010 elections, and possibly the lowest turnout rate since the 1942 election.

=== 2015–2016 election cycle ===
In 2016, 10 Democratic and 23 Republicans seats were up for reelection. In order to have gained a majority, the Democrats would have needed to attain at least 51 seats or 50 seats (and hold the presidency) in the Senate. If they had won the presidency, the Democrats would have been able to gain a majority with 48 seats (assuming the two Independents continued to caucus with them) because, in event of a tie vote, the Vice President becomes the tie-breaker. Many of the incumbents were elected in the Republican wave year of 2010 midterm. The Democrats needed to gain 4 seats as the Republicans held the majority 54–46, with both independent candidates caucusing with the Democrats. Two-term Senator Jon Tester of Montana chaired the DSCC for this cycle.

There were five seats that the Democrats needed to defend this cycle: Michael Bennet of Colorado, Patty Murray of Washington, and the seats of retiring Senators Harry Reid of Nevada, Barbara Boxer of California, and Barbara Mikulski of Maryland. Seven of the Republican seats that were up for reelection were in states that Obama won twice, Mark Kirk of Illinois, Pat Toomey of Pennsylvania, Ron Johnson of Wisconsin, Kelly Ayotte of New Hampshire, Chuck Grassley of Iowa, Rob Portman of Ohio and Marco Rubio of Florida who ran for reelection after an unsuccessful presidential bid. In all but one of those seats, Iowa, the Republican incumbents were fighting to be reelected for the first time. Democrats were also targeting the open seat in Indiana which was vacated by retiring Republican Dan Coats. There were several other states the Democrats were focused on where the Republican incumbents may have been vulnerable: John McCain of Arizona, Lisa Murkowski of Alaska, John Boozman of Arkansas, Richard Burr of North Carolina, Johnny Isakson of Georgia, Roy Blunt of Missouri, Rand Paul of Kentucky who simultaneously ran for president, and Senator David Vitter of Louisiana.

After the election, Democrats gained two seats. Tammy Duckworth of Illinois and Maggie Hassan of New Hampshire joined the caucus. They also successfully defended their only seat in contention, Nevada where Catherine Cortez Masto became the first Latina U.S. Senator. This was the first time since 1992 that the Democrats gained seats in this Senate Class. For the first time the DSCC did not endorse a candidate in the general election in California because both women were Democrats competing for the seat of retiring Senator Barbara Boxer. Kamala Harris beat Loretta Sanchez for the seat.

=== 2017–2018 election cycle ===
First-term Senator Chris Van Hollen of Maryland chaired the DSCC for the 2017–2018 election cycle. Before the 2018 elections, Democrats held 49 seats in the U.S. Senate while Republicans held 51. The unusually imbalanced 2018 Senate map, created by successful 2006 and 2012 elections, resulted in a large number of vulnerable Democrats. Joe Donnelly of Indiana, Claire McCaskill of Missouri, Joe Manchin of West Virginia, Heidi Heitkamp of North Dakota, Jon Tester of Montana and Bill Nelson of Florida were seen as the most vulnerable. On November 6, incumbent Democrats in four states were unseated; Donnelly was unseated by State Rep. Mike Braun, McCaskill was defeated by Missouri Attorney General Josh Hawley, Heitkamp was defeated by Kevin Cramer, representative for North Dakota's at-large congressional district, and Nelson was defeated by then Governor Rick Scott. The DSCC considered open seats in Arizona and Tennessee, Dean Heller's seat in Nevada and potentially Ted Cruz's seat in Texas and Cindy Hyde-Smith's seat in Mississippi as possible targets. Of those potentially vulnerable seats, Democrats picked up the open seat in Arizona vacated by Jeff Flake, with Rep. Kyrsten Sinema defeated Rep. Martha McSally, as well as the seat in Nevada held by Dean Heller, being defeated by Rep. Jacky Rosen, leaving the Senate's balance at 53–47, with Republicans in control.

=== 2019–2021 election cycle ===
First-term Senator Catherine Cortez Masto of Nevada chaired the DSCC for the 2019–2020 election cycle, the first Latina to do so. Before the 2020 elections, Democrats held 47 seats, while Republicans held 53. In order to have gained a majority, Democrats would have needed to win at least 4 seats, or 3 seats and the presidency. If they won the presidency, Democrats would have been able to gain a majority with 48 seats (assuming the two Independents continued to caucus with them) because, in event of a tie vote, the Vice President becomes the tie-breaker.

Democrats needed to defend 12 seats this cycle, with only 2 in states Donald Trump won, Alabama and Michigan. In Alabama, Senator Doug Jones had only managed to win due to an extremely flawed candidate in Roy Moore, and was expected to lose due to the strong Republican lean there, which he did. In Michigan, Senator Gary Peters faced a very strong Republican candidate, businessman John James, but was nevertheless expected to win.

Republicans, on the other hand, needed to defend 21 seats, along with 2 seats up for special elections. Only 2 seats were in states that Democrats won in 2016, Maine and Colorado. Colorado was seen as the most likely flip for the Democrats, due to incumbent Senator Cory Gardner tying himself heavily to Trump in a state he had lost by 4.5 points in 2016, and expected to lose by a much larger margin this cycle. Popular former Governor John Hickenlooper was the Democratic nominee. In Maine, popular incumbent Susan Collins had won by a landslide in 2014, but was seen as weakened by her vote to confirm Supreme Court Justice Brett Kavanaugh and her vote to acquit Trump during his first impeachment trial. This was seen as the third most likely flip for the Democrats, after Arizona.

Republicans needed to defend seats in key swing states such as Arizona, Georgia, North Carolina, and Iowa. Seats in South Carolina, Kansas, Montana, and Alaska became surprisingly competitive, compared to their usual Republican lean. Arizona was seen as the second most likely flip for the Democrats, as it was a key swing state, along with the incumbent Senator Martha McSally losing to Kyrsten Sinema for the other senate seat two years earlier, and a strong challenger, former astronaut Mark Kelly. North Carolina was seen as a highly likely flip, until the Democratic nominee, Cal Cunningham, got involved in a sex scandal that significantly hurt his candidacy. Democrats failed to flip seats in North Carolina, possibly due to the scandal, Iowa, due to Trump's over performance there, Maine, due to an underestimation of Collins' popularity and continued ticket splitting, and the seats that had unexpectedly appeared competitive maintaining their partisan lean.

Democrats initially only flipped the seats in Arizona and Colorado, leaving the balance of power at 52–48. However, Democrats also defeated Donald Trump, meaning there would be a Democratic vice president, and the two seats in Georgia went to runoffs because no candidate received a majority of the vote in either election. The runoffs were held on January 5, 2021. Democrats flipped both seats, allowing them to take control of the Senate, since Vice President Kamala Harris would cast the tie-breaking vote.

=== 2021–2022 election cycle ===
After the 2020–2021 cycle, Democrats governed with a bare 50–50 majority in the United States Senate. Senator Gary Peters, who had won re-election in 2020, chaired the DSCC for the 2021–2022 cycle. Going into the cycle, Democrats had 14 seats up for election while Republicans had 21. In order to maintain their majority in the Senate, Democrats had to defend Catherine Cortez Masto in Nevada, Raphael Warnock in Georgia, Mark Kelly in Arizona, and Maggie Hassan in New Hampshire, all of which represented states that incumbent President Biden had won in 2020. Republicans had also targeted senators in traditionally Democratic states such as Michael Bennet of Colorado and Patty Murray of Washington, while Democrats attempted to pick up open seats in Pennsylvania, North Carolina, and Ohio. Pennsylvania was seen as the most likely flip for the Democrats, while Nevada was seen as the most likely flip for the Republicans.

Democrats overperformed in the 2022 elections overall, with incumbents Maggie Hassan and Mark Kelly winning by larger margins than anticipated, and Democratic challenger Mandela Barnes losing to Wisconsin senator Ron Johnson by a much smaller margin than expected. Democrats flipped the open seat in Pennsylvania, electing Democrat John Fetterman over Republican Mehmet Oz to replace Republican Pat Toomey. Upon Catherine Cortez Masto's narrow victory over Adam Laxalt in Nevada, it was projected that Democrats would retain 50 senators and thus maintain control of the U.S. Senate.

A runoff election between incumbent Democrat Raphael Warnock and Republican challenger Herschel Walker ultimately ended in Warnock prevailing, leaving Democrats with a 51–49 majority after the elections.

=== 2023–2024 election cycle ===
Senator Gary Peters of Michigan was selected as DSCC chair for a second consecutive cycle, the first since Chuck Schumer to be so. The Class 1 cycle of Democratic senators continue to dwindle, with Joe Manchin of West Virginia and Jon Tester of Montana being the last of the 2012 vulnerable class, and with it adding Sherrod Brown of Ohio as another Senator from a now-Republican-tilted state. With Manchin retiring, the West Virginia seat was written off, putting focus on Jacky Rosen in Nevada, Bob Casey Jr. in Pennsylvania, Tammy Baldwin in Wisconsin, newcomers Ruben Gallego in Arizona and Elissa Slotkin in Michigan; all these were hotly contested swing states in 2020. The entry of Larry Hogan into Maryland's race was an unexpected turn that was expected to siphon funds from tougher fights. On the offensive, Democrats aimed at single-point senators Ted Cruz in Texas and Rick Scott in Florida; however, Texas has been an unachieved dream for multiple cycles, while Florida has consistently been tilting Republican throughout Scott's tenure.

Facing a stronger red tide than in of 2022, all Senate candidates overperformed the losing Democratic candidate Harris in terms of margin, though not necessarily in voter count; Trump swept all noted swing states in the concurrent presidential election. Tester's 12-point and Brown's 5-point edge were not enough to win in their deep-red states, with Florida and Texas's rightward shift clearly putting Democratic Senate hopes away. Casey lost to Republican David McCormick in an electoral upset. Other Democratic swing state candidates won by narrow margins. Republicans ultimately flipped four Senate seats from the Democratic caucus, winning a 53–47 majority in the chamber.

=== 2025–2026 election cycle ===
In September 2025, DSCC chairwoman and Senator Kirsten Gillibrand circulated an invitation to a Democratic Senatorial Campaign Committee "Napa Retreat" and scheduled for October 13–14 at the luxury Hotel Yountville in California. The event, described in the invitation as offering a "Tuscan-European vibe," included accommodations, a wine tour, and dinner in the wine caves of Staglin Family Vineyards. Haley Stevens was listed among the featured guests, signaling what Politico described as "the closest link so far" between Stevens and the DSCC's support for her Senate campaign. Spokespeople for Stevens and the DSCC did not dispute the reporting which would go on amid a government shutdown.

The populist Fight Club faction was formed, in part, as a reaction to the recruitment strategies and perceived favoritism in Democratic primaries during Gillibrand's tenure as DSCC chair.

== See also ==
- Democratic Congressional Campaign Committee
- National Republican Senatorial Committee
