= Larry Robinson (poet) =

American poet

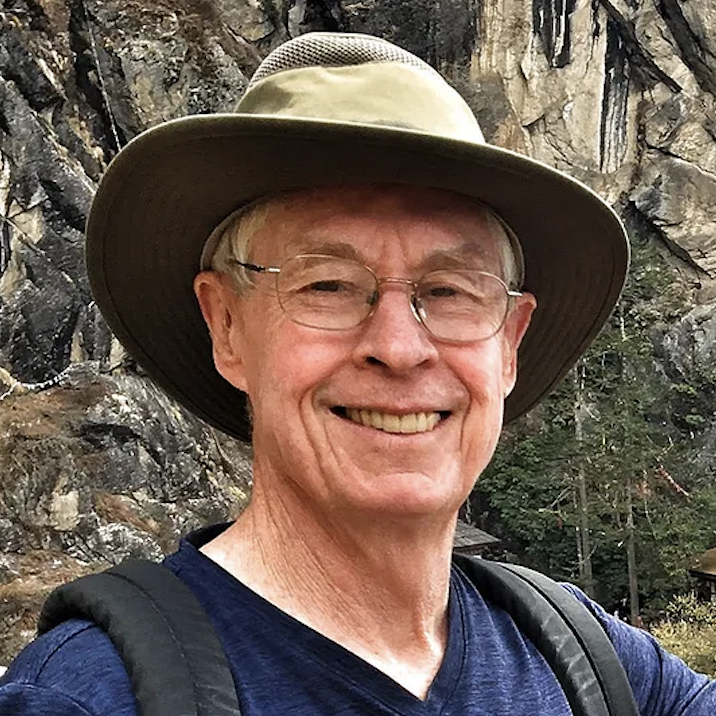
- Larry Robinson at the Taktsang Palphug Monastery Bhutan in 2017
- Born: 1947 (age 78–79); Tiburon, California
- Education: University of California, Santa Cruz
- Occupations: Poet, author, psychotherapist
- Known for: Book: "Roll Away the Stone"

Larry Robinson is an American poet.

== Life ==
Larry Robinson was born in Tiburon, California and came to Sonoma County, California in 1976. He graduated from the University of California, Santa Cruz in 1969 and earned his Masters in Marriage and Family Therapy from Sonoma State University

Beginning in 1987, he worked as a psychotherapist for nearly 20 years and is now retired. He served on the Sebastopol, California City Council from 1998-2010, including serving as Mayor from 2000-2001 and 2004-2005; during those periods, he was part of a Green Party majority on the City Council.

Robinson founded the Rumi's Caravan event in 2000, an evening of poetry in the ecstatic tradition, which takes place annually, most recently at the Sebastopol Center for the Arts, Sebastopol, California. There is also a traveling troupe of poetry performers associated with the caravan. All of the performances raise money for nonprofit projects.

Robinson currently lives in Sebastopol, California.

=== Poetry books ===
- Roll Away the Stone. CreateSpace Independent Publishing Platform. 2015. ISBN 9781517236861.

== Reviews ==
“For years, many of us have been enjoying the daily e-mail poems sent to us by Sebastopol poet Larry Robinson. Larry is a proponent of the oral tradition as well, hosting oral poetry salons and participating in the Rumi’s Caravan events. Now Larry has a new book: 'Roll Away the Stone', featuring 40 poems written over the past 20 years.”
