= National Republican Senatorial Committee =

Senate Republican campaign arm

- Founded: 1916; 110 years ago
- Purpose: To elect Republicans to the United States Senate
- Location(s): 425 2nd Street NE, Washington, D.C. 20002, United States
- Chair: Tim Scott (SC)
- Vice Chairs: Katie Britt (AL); Marsha Blackburn (TN); Bernie Moreno (OH); Jim Banks (IN)
- Parent organization: Republican Party
- Website: nrsc.org

The National Republican Senatorial Committee (NRSC) is the Republican Hill committee for the United States Senate, working to elect Republicans to the Senate. The NRSC was founded in 1916 as the Republican Senatorial Campaign Committee. It was reorganized in 1948 and renamed the National Republican Senatorial Committee. It has been chaired by Senator Tim Scott from South Carolina since 2025.

The NRSC helps elect Republican incumbents and challengers primarily through fundraising.

== List of chairmen ==
Name	State	Term
John W. Weeks	MA	1916
Jacob H. Gallinger	NH	1918
Miles Poindexter	WA	1920–1921
Joseph M. McCormick	IL	1921–1922
George H. Moses	NH	1922–1924
Simeon D. Fess	OH	1925–1926
Lawrence C. Phipps	CO	1926–1927
George H. Moses	NH	1927–1928
Jesse H. Metcalf	RI	1928–1929
George H. Moses	NH	1929–1930
Henry D. Hatfield	WV	1931–1932
Lester J. Dickinson	IA	1932–1934
Daniel O. Hastings	DE	1934–1936
John G. Townsend Jr.	DE	1936–1949
Owen Brewster	ME	1949–1951
Styles Bridges	NH	1951–1953
Everett Dirksen	IL	1953–1955
Barry Goldwater	AZ	1955–1956
Andrew Frank Schoeppel	KS	1956–1959
Barry Goldwater	AZ	1959–1963
Thruston Morton	KY	1963–1967
George Murphy	CA	1967–1969
John Tower	TX	1969–1971
Peter H. Dominick	CO	1971–1973
Bill Brock	TN	1973–1975
Ted Stevens	AK	1975–1977
Bob Packwood	OR	1977–1979
John Heinz	PA	1979–1981
Bob Packwood	OR	1981–1983
Richard Lugar	IN	1983–1985
John Heinz	PA	1985–1987
Rudy Boschwitz	MN	1987–1989
Don Nickles	OK	1989–1991
Phil Gramm	TX	1991–1995
Al D'Amato	NY	1995–1997
Mitch McConnell	KY	1997–2001
Bill Frist	TN	2001–2003
George Allen	VA	2003–2005
Elizabeth Dole	NC	2005–2007
John Ensign	NV	2007–2009
John Cornyn	TX	2009–2013
Jerry Moran	KS	2013–2015
Roger Wicker	MS	2015–2017
Cory Gardner	CO	2017–2019
Todd Young	IN	2019–2021
Rick Scott	FL	2021–2023
Steve Daines	MT	2023–2025
Tim Scott	SC	2025

== See also ==
- National Republican Congressional Committee
- Democratic Senatorial Campaign Committee
