= Cliff Thornton =

American drug policy activist (born 1945)

Clifford "Cliff" W. Thornton, Jr. (born January 16, 1945) is an American drug policy reform advocate and Green politician who served as one of the seven co-chairs of the Green Party of the United States.

== Career ==
In the 1990s, Thornton founded Efficacy, a non-profit advocacy group to educate about drug policy reform.

From 2003 to 2008, Thornton spoke to over 400,000 people on drug reform in 750 venues around the United States, Australia, Canada, Europe, and New Zealand. Thornton appeared on over 400 radio shows and numerous television spots on drug policy reform as it relates to health, race/class and economics. He is described as "America's foremost anti-Drug War African American activist" by Amherst College's online newspaper. Thornton, a retired telephone company executive, also speaks on education, and health care.

In 2006, Thornton was the nominee of the Connecticut Green Party for Governor. He was the first African American candidate to appear on the general election ballot for Governor of Connecticut. Some political analysts commended Thornton for his strong stance on drug policy reform. In October 2006, Thornton was initially invited to a gubernatorial debate co-sponsored by the League of Women Voters and The Day newspaper of New London, before being uninvited due to a disagreement among the debate sponsors regarding his eligibility for participation. His campaign received 9,583 votes for just under one percent of the overall vote.

In 2007, Thornton received the Robert C. Randall Award for Achievement in the Field of Citizen Action from the Drug Policy Alliance.
