= Richard Pombo =

American politician (born 1961)

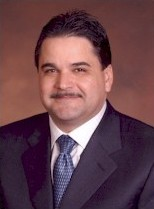

Chair of the House Resources Committee
- In office January 8, 2003 – January 3, 2007
- Preceded by: Jim Hansen
- Succeeded by: Nick Rahall

Member of the U.S. House of Representatives from California's 11th district
- In office January 3, 1993 – January 3, 2007
- Preceded by: District redrawn
- Succeeded by: Jerry McNerney

Personal details
- Born: Richard William Pombo; January 8, 1961 (age 65) Tracy, California, U.S.
- Party: Republican
- Spouse: Annette Cole (m. 1983)
- Children: 3
- Education: California State Polytechnic University, Pomona (attended)
- Occupation: Politician, lobbyist, rancher
- Awards: Grand Officer of the Order of Prince Henry (1996)
- Pombo’s voice Speaking on fisheries legislation Recorded December 8, 2006

Richard William Pombo (born January 8, 1961) is an American politician and lobbyist who represented California's 11th congressional district in the United States House of Representatives from January 3, 1993, to January 3, 2007. A Republican, he chaired the House Resources Committee during the 108th and 109th Congresses, from 2003 to 2007.

A native of Tracy, California, Pombo worked in his family's agricultural businesses before entering local politics. He co-founded the San Joaquin County Citizens Land Alliance and served on the Tracy City Council before his election to Congress in 1992. His congressional priorities included private property rights, changes to the Endangered Species Act, and natural-resource development. He worked on the Healthy Forests Restoration Act, the Tribal Forest Protection Act, and legislation authorizing the CALFED Bay-Delta Program.

Pombo lost his seat to Democrat Jerry McNerney in the 2006 election. He unsuccessfully sought the Republican nomination in California's 19th congressional district in 2010. After Congress, he worked in consulting and lobbying on energy, water and federal regulatory issues.

== Early life and education ==
Pombo was born in Tracy on January 8, 1961. He attended Cal Poly Pomona from 1979 to 1982. He left before completing a degree to work in his family's cattle, dairy and trucking businesses. He grew up working on the family's ranch, which his grandfather, a Portuguese immigrant, had purchased.

== Early political career ==
Pombo's property-rights activism developed during a dispute in the mid-1980s over a proposed recreational trail on an abandoned railroad right-of-way near his family's ranch. Pombo said the trail would cross the ranch and that officials had not agreed to fence and maintain it; park officials said the route would not cross his property and that they had offered to fence and police it. The project was dropped after litigation.

Pombo co-founded the San Joaquin County Citizens Land Alliance. He was elected to the Tracy City Council in 1990 and served until 1992.

== U.S. House of Representatives ==
=== Elections and district ===
Pombo won the Republican primary for a seat created by redistricting, defeating opponents including former Sacramento County supervisor Sandra Smoley. In 1992, Pombo defeated Democrat Patti Garamendi to win the 11th district seat. He served seven terms, from January 3, 1993, to January 3, 2007.

Before the redistricting for the 2002 election, the district covered parts of San Joaquin and Sacramento counties. Following that redistricting, the district included parts of Alameda, Contra Costa, Santa Clara and San Joaquin counties. In 2004, he defeated McNerney with 163,582 votes to 103,587.

=== Committee assignments and leadership ===
Pombo served on the Agriculture Committee throughout his seven terms and chaired its Livestock and Horticulture Subcommittee during the 106th Congress. In March 2006 he became the committee's vice chair, succeeding John Boehner. He was also a member and former chair of the Congressional Western Caucus, and co-chair of the Portuguese American Caucus.

He also served on the Merchant Marine and Fisheries Committee during the 103rd Congress (1993–1995) and the Transportation and Infrastructure Committee during the 107th Congress (2001–2003).

Republicans selected Pombo to chair the Resources Committee on January 8, 2003, with support from House Majority Leader Tom DeLay, passing over more senior members. He succeeded Jim Hansen. He chaired the committee in the 108th and 109th Congresses, until his House service ended on January 3, 2007.

The committee's jurisdiction included public lands, forests, national parks, fisheries and wildlife, minerals, water and irrigation, and Native American and insular affairs. Under Pombo, it organized for the 108th Congress on February 12, 2003, with five subcommittees. Its early hearings included proposals for drilling in the Arctic National Wildlife Refuge and a competing proposal to designate its coastal plain as wilderness.

Pombo was also a member of the Congressional Hispanic Conference.

=== Environmental policy and property rights ===
In 1996, he and Joseph Farah published This Land Is Our Land: How to End the War on Private Property.

In 1995, Resources Committee chair Don Young appointed Pombo to lead a task force on reauthorization of the Endangered Species Act. The Young–Pombo proposal advanced through the committee but faced opposition from environmental organizations.

As Resources Committee chair, Pombo supported oil drilling in the Arctic National Wildlife Refuge. He worked with Democratic senators Dianne Feinstein and Ron Wyden on the Healthy Forests Restoration Act of 2003, which expedited environmental reviews of projects intended to reduce wildfire risk. He also worked with Feinstein on the Tribal Forest Protection Act of 2004, concerning projects on federal land adjoining tribal land.

In September 2005, Pombo introduced the Threatened and Endangered Species Recovery Act. It would have repealed the Endangered Species Act's provisions for designating critical habitat and compensated private landowners for the costs of conservation measures. The House passed the bill 229–193 on September 29, 2005; it was referred to a Senate committee and did not become law.

In March 2006, Environmental Science & Technology reported that timber-industry lobbyist Steve Quarles had helped Pombo's staff write the bill. The Save Our Species Alliance promoted the proposed changes; its campaign director, Tim Wigley, was also an executive at Pac/West Communications. Wigley described the alliance as a grassroots coalition of farmers, labor groups and others seeking to modernize the act. The report examined the organizers' ties to timber-industry lobbying and earlier campaigns for the Healthy Forests legislation.

Pombo also opposed proposals to establish the Wild Sky Wilderness in Washington. Earlier versions passed the Senate but failed to advance in the House, largely because of his opposition as committee chair, according to The Seattle Times.

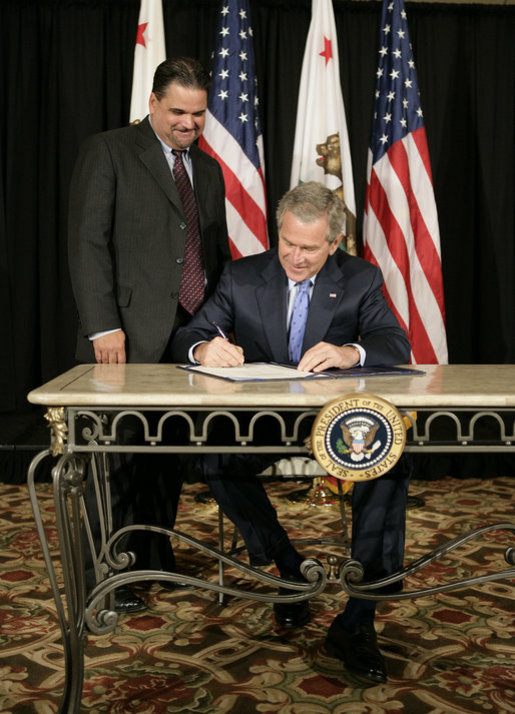
Pombo with President George W. Bush at the signing of the Partners for Fish and Wildlife Act in Stockton on October 3, 2006.

=== Public lands, mining and energy ===
In September 2005, draft legislation prepared by Pombo proposed selling 15 National Park Service sites and allowing advertising and naming rights in parks. His aides said the draft was intended to encourage support for Arctic National Wildlife Refuge drilling rather than to be enacted.

Pombo and Representative Jim Gibbons also backed mining-law changes in the House budget-reconciliation bill that would have lifted a moratorium on selling federal land covered by mining claims. Dan Randolph of the San Juan Citizens Alliance criticized the proposal as permitting real-estate speculation and development rather than mining. Gibbons argued that the changes would support economic development in mining communities. The proposed prices were $1,000 per acre or market value, whichever was higher. Opposition included environmental groups, hunters, other recreational users, and Western governors and senators. Republican leaders removed the mining provisions from the budget bill in December 2005.

In September 2006, Representative George Miller and other House Democrats urged Pombo to hold hearings on Interior Department oversight and oil-royalty payments. The dispute involved offshore leases that lacked price thresholds triggering royalty payments. The Democrats advocated barring companies from future leases unless they renegotiated; Pombo had included a provision in House offshore-drilling legislation to charge a fee to companies that declined renegotiation. Pombo said he was concerned and would speak with the department's inspector general. His spokesman said he had not decided whether to hold formal hearings.

=== Water and agriculture ===
Pombo supported legislation authorizing $389 million for the CALFED Bay-Delta Program, including water storage and transport, levee repairs and wastewater recycling. The House passed a version in July 2004. Bay Area Democrats objected to allowing the Interior secretary to preauthorize dam projects without further congressional approval; Senator Dianne Feinstein said that provision could not pass the Senate.

President George W. Bush signed the Water Supply Reliability and Environmental Improvement Act on October 25, 2004. It authorized CALFED's long-term program for Bay–Delta ecosystem restoration, water supply, water quality and flood control. Interior Secretary Gale Norton credited Pombo, Feinstein, Pete Domenici and Ken Calvert with developing the legislation.

In 2006, Pombo advocated reducing direct subsidies to crop farmers and changing the tax system to encourage agricultural exports.

=== Iraq and surveillance ===
Pombo supported the Iraq War. In August 2006, MoveOn targeted him over that support, citing an analysis by the National Priorities Project estimating $974 million in war costs attributable to taxpayers in his district.

On September 28, 2006, Pombo voted for the Electronic Surveillance Modernization Act, H.R.5825. The bill would have expanded the circumstances in which foreign-intelligence surveillance could proceed without a court order. It passed the House 232–191 but did not become law; the Senate referred it to the Judiciary Committee.

=== Transportation proposals ===
In 2005, Pombo secured $21.6 million for studies of two proposed highways: a State Route 239 connection between Tracy and Brentwood, and a State Route 130 connection between the Central Valley and the San Francisco Bay Area. He argued that new routes would help relieve congestion. An East Bay Express investigation criticized his decision to fund those studies while obtaining no federal funding for widening Interstate 205, which local business and labor groups were promoting. The newspaper also reported that his family's land holdings near the proposed routes could benefit from the projects.

=== Ethics and campaign-finance disputes ===
In 2005, Citizens for Responsibility and Ethics in Washington included Pombo in its report on members of Congress it considered corrupt. When the group made further allegations in May 2006, Pombo denied wrongdoing and characterized it as a liberal activist organization.

High Country News reported in 2005 that Pombo's political action committee, RICH PAC, received $5,000 from lobbyist Jack Abramoff in 2004 and also contributed $5,000 to DeLay's legal defense fund. The Los Angeles Times counted $357,325 paid to Pombo's wife and brother during 2001–2004.

In October 2004, Resources Committee staff sent Interior Secretary Gale Norton a letter bearing Pombo's signature seeking suspension of guidelines intended to protect birds from wind turbines. His parents leased land to wind-energy companies in the Altamont Pass. Pombo said he had not known about the letter, and his staff said they sent it without his knowledge.

The committee's taxpayer-funded mailings also drew criticism. In 2004 it sent leaflets to Minnesota and Wisconsin residents praising the Bush administration's snowmobile policy for national parks. Public Citizen filed a complaint with the House Franking Commission. Pombo's spokesman defended the mailings as public outreach.

In February 2006, the San Francisco Chronicle reported that the federal government paid $4,935 for an RV Pombo used to tour national parks with his family in August 2003. Pombo defended the expense as official committee business and said the RV was cheaper than flying. His spokesman said the House Administration Committee had approved the rental beforehand. Park officials disputed meetings at Badlands and Joshua Tree; Pombo's spokesman defended his account.

Pombo and Representative John Doolittle subpoenaed confidential Federal Deposit Insurance Corporation records concerning its investigation of financier Charles Hurwitz. The FDIC dropped its case in 2002; Pombo and Doolittle had argued that the inquiry was unfair.

The Record reported in September 2006 that Pombo's committees had received nearly $18,000 from VECO Corporation, an Alaska oil-services company then under federal investigation. McNerney called for the contributions to be returned. Pombo's spokesman said the campaign would retain them while awaiting more information, and would likely donate them to charity if the company or its executives were indicted.

In October 2006, the Record reported that Abramoff's billing records listed two contacts with Pombo in 1996 concerning the Northern Mariana Islands. Pombo denied substantive dealings with Abramoff. His spokesman disputed the entries, pointing to Abramoff's admitted billing fraud; Abramoff's lawyer would not confirm or deny their accuracy. The paper reported that Abramoff had contributed $7,500 to Pombo, which Pombo had since donated to charity.

In July 2005, Christopher Ilitch and Mike Malik hosted a $5,000-per-person fundraiser for Pombo at the All-Star Game in Detroit. Their businesses were financing the Shinnecock Indian Nation's land-claim and casino proposals. A Pombo spokesperson denied any connection between the fundraiser and a Resources Committee hearing on New York tribal land claims later that week; the Shinnecock were not scheduled to testify.

Indianz.com reported in December 2005 that Mashpee Wampanoag members, leaders and lobbyists had contributed $32,000 to Pombo since he became Resources Committee chair in 2003. Pombo denied that the contributions were connected to his proposed legislation to expedite the tribe's federal-recognition petition.

In a separate campaign-finance case, Michael McNerney and McNerney for Congress complained that RICH PAC had paid $161,000 in fundraising costs on Pombo's campaign's behalf, creating excessive in-kind contributions. On September 11, 2007, the Federal Election Commission found no reason to believe Pombo or the committees had committed the alleged contribution and reporting violations, and closed the case. Its analysis said differing contract terms explained the payment discrepancies and that the complaint did not establish that the PAC had subsidized the campaign's fundraising.

In a January 2010 retrospective, reporter Justin Elliott noted that Pombo had not been charged with a crime in connection with Abramoff or the other ethics disputes.

=== 2006 election ===
Pombo faced former representative Pete McCloskey in the June 6 Republican primary. Pombo won 62.4% of the vote, compared with McCloskey's 31.9%. McCloskey subsequently endorsed McNerney.

During the primary, the League of Conservation Voters supported McCloskey through telephone calls and mailings. The Sierra Club advertised against Pombo on radio, while Humane USA Political Action Committee sent more than 6,000 letters criticizing his record to animal-welfare organizations' members in the district.

The League of Conservation Voters placed Pombo on its 2006 "Dirty Dozen" list and announced that it would campaign for his defeat.

The San Francisco Chronicle described a national Democratic and anti-incumbent trend, as well as changes in Tracy's electorate as Bay Area commuters moved into the city. Traffic, housing and development had become prominent local issues.

In early October, a poll by the Democratic firm Greenberg Quinlan Rosner put McNerney at 48% and Pombo at 46%, within its margin of error. Pombo's spokesman rejected the findings. Congressional Quarterly changed its rating from Republican Favored to Leans Republican. The National Republican Congressional Committee funded polling and campaign activity but did not release its internal polling results; its spokesman said the spending countered negative environmental-group advertising.

The Sierra Club, League of Conservation Voters and Defenders of Wildlife Action Fund jointly campaigned against Pombo, funding advertising and voter outreach and recruiting hundreds of volunteers. The Democratic Congressional Campaign Committee began spending on the race in late October; Bill Clinton held a rally for McNerney, while Laura Bush campaigned for Pombo.

The Chronicle reported that Pombo had raised $3,764,256 through October 18, compared with McNerney's $1,584,258. Independent committees had spent $3,047,723 through November 6, including more than $1.4 million from the National Republican Congressional Committee, more than $216,000 from the Democratic Congressional Campaign Committee and more than $1 million from environmental groups.

McNerney defeated Pombo in the November 7 election, receiving 109,868 votes to Pombo's 96,396. After the election, McNerney said President George W. Bush's campaign visit had helped mobilize Pombo's opponents.

== Post-congressional career ==
In February 2007, the Contra Costa Times reported that Pombo had joined Oregon-based Pac/West Communications, a lobbying and public-relations firm.

=== 2010 congressional campaign ===
On January 4, 2010, Pombo announced that he would seek the Republican nomination in California's 19th congressional district to succeed retiring Representative George Radanovich. He lived outside the district but said its issues were similar to those in his former constituency. Pombo campaigned on revising the Endangered Species Act. Radanovich endorsed Denham; the Defenders of Wildlife Action Fund opposed Pombo. He signed the Americans for Tax Reform Taxpayer Protection Pledge during the campaign. In the June 8 primary he finished third with 15,196 votes, or 20.7%, behind Jeff Denham and Jim Patterson.

Besides Denham, the Republican field included former Fresno mayor Jim Patterson and Fresno city council member Larry Westerlund.

=== Consulting and lobbying ===
In 2015 Pombo became a partner in Gavel Resources, lobbying on energy, water and federal regulatory issues. The Record reported that the firm's clients included Cadiz Inc., Xcel Energy and the Northern California Power Association.

Pombo also lobbied for the developer of the proposed Pebble Mine, a copper and gold project near Alaska's Bristol Bay. Greenwire reported in January 2022 that Gavel Resources remained on retainer for the developer in the fourth quarter of 2021 but had reported no lobbying activity during that quarter.

A second-quarter 2026 lobbying report filed by Gavel Resources listed Pombo as a lobbyist for Cadiz on appropriations provisions related to the Bureau of Land Management.

== Electoral history ==
General elections in California's 11th congressional district
Year	Pombo votes	Pombo share	Democratic opponent	Opponent votes	Other candidates (votes)	Result
1992	94,453	47.6%	Patti Garamendi	90,539	Christine Roberts (Libertarian): 13,498	Won
1994	99,302	62.1%	Randy A. Perry	55,794	Joseph P. Miller (Libertarian): 4,718	Won
1996	107,477	59.3%	Jason Silva	65,536	Kelly Rego (Libertarian): 5,077; Selene L. Bush (Natural Law): 3,006	Won
1998	95,496	61.4%	Robert L. Figueroa	56,345	Jesse Baird (Libertarian): 3,608	Won
2000	120,635	57.8%	Tony Y. Santos	79,539	Kathryn A. Russow (Libertarian): 5,036; Jon A. Kurey (Natural Law): 3,397	Won
2002	104,921	60.3%	Elaine Shaw	69,035	—	Won
2004	163,582	61.2%	Jerry McNerney	103,587	—	Won
2006	96,396	46.7%	Jerry McNerney	109,868	—	Lost

Selected Republican primary elections
Year	District	Status	Pombo votes	Pombo share	Other candidates (votes; share)	Result
2006	11th	Incumbent	35,493	62.4%	Pete McCloskey: 18,132; 31.9% Thomas A. Benigno: 3,263; 5.7%	Won nomination
2010	19th	Former representative	15,196	20.7%	Jeff Denham: 26,594; 36.3% Jim Patterson: 22,355; 30.6% Larry Westerlund: 9,126; 12.4%	Third place

== Personal life and honors ==
Pombo married Annette Cole in 1983. They have three children.

On June 8, 1996, Portugal appointed Pombo a Grand Officer of the Order of Prince Henry.

U.S. House of Representatives
Preceded by District redrawn	Member of the U.S. House of Representatives from California's 11th congressional district 1993–2007	Succeeded by Jerry McNerney
Political offices
Preceded by Jim Hansen	Chair of the House Resources Committee; 2003–2007	Succeeded by Nick Rahall
