= Save Our Species Alliance =

American political group

Save Our Species Alliance, Inc. (SOSA) was an American political group, established in December 2004, which is critical of the Endangered Species Act and other environmental legislation. It has been criticized by environmentalists as a front group for wealthy cattle and timber interests which consider federal environmental legislation an impediment to profit. The consumer advocacy group Public Citizen says that by attempting to give the appearance of a grassroots organization, the Save Our Species Alliance web site is an example of Astroturfing.

SOSA describes itself as "a nationwide grassroots organization comprised of property owners, farmers, ranchers, miners, foresters, builders/developers, sportsmen, recreationists, business owners and ordinary citizens [sharing] the common goal of making the Endangered Species Act friendlier to local conservation efforts, property owners, and local governments while at the same time, doing a better job of actually saving species at risk." SOSA was established as a 501(c)(4) civic organization in December 2004. It spent $2.8 million in 2005, stating that its social welfare campaign sought to "modernize and update the Endangered Species Act." According to its 2005 financial disclosure, "[t]his corporation was incorporated in the state of Delaware. Names of the contributors under Delaware state law cannot be revealed to any other party."

The campaign director for SOSA is Tim Wigley, who was formerly the president of the Oregon Forest Industries Council and worked as director of communications for pulp and paper company Georgia-Pacific. Wigley led the group Project Protect, which supported the Healthy Forests Initiative and was run out of the offices of the American Forest Resource Council. Other SOSA figures include Steve Quarles, a timber industry lobbyist; supporters include the Competitive Enterprise Institute.

== Political connections ==
In September 2005, Congressman Richard Pombo helped rewrite the 1973 Endangered Species Act, which "was widely denounced by environmentalists as a disturbing retreat from habitat protection and a paperwork nightmare for agencies seeking to revive the 1,268 threatened and endangered plants and animals in the country, 186 of which are in California."

By March 2006, it was revealed in Environmental Science & Technology that Pombo had been coordinating efforts with Pac/West Communications to weaken the Endangered Species Act (ESA). Pac/West created the Save Our Species Alliance, an anti-environmental front group that campaigned for Pombo's bill to change the ESA. Ultimately, SOSA and Pombo failed, as the bill did not become law. Pombo was defeated in the 2006 Congressional election and replaced by Jerry McNerney, a wind engineer and renewable energy expert.
