= Ashik Siddique =

American socialist activist (born 1988)

- Siddique in 2026

National Co-Chair of the Democratic Socialists of America
- Incumbent
- Assumed office August 2023 Serving with Megan Romer
- Preceded by: Office established

Personal details
- Born: 1987 or 1988 (age 38–39)
- Citizenship: United States

Ashik Siddique (Note: Pronounced /ɑːʃiːk sɪdik/ ah-SHEEK sih-DEEK.) is an American democratic socialist political activist. Siddique is a member of the Democratic Socialists of America (DSA), where he was elected as national co-chair from 2023 to 2027 and National Political Committee member from 2021 to 2023. Siddique works as a research analyst at the National Priorities Project of the Institute for Policy Studies.

== Election results ==
In 2018, Siddique ran for Advisory Neighborhood Commission (ANC) district 4C03 in Washington, DC, but lost to an incumbent.

Siddique joined the Democratic Socialists of America (DSA) in 2017. At DSA's 2021 National Convention, Siddique was elected to the DSA National Political Committee (NPC). After DSA's 2023 National Convention, Siddique and Megan Romer were elected as national co-chairs, a newly created position. In 2025, Siddique and Romer were re-elected as co-chairs.

Siddique is a member of DSA's Groundwork caucus, an ecosocialist caucus that supports the democratic road to socialism.

== Political activity ==
In 2019, Siddique argued that the national military budget should be cut substantially in favor of the National Priorities Project's "Poor People's Moral Budget", which would greatly increase social spending.

In 2020, Siddique argued that DSA's Green New Deal hopes would falter without building "organized power to do anything about it", such as expanding labor unions. In 2021, Siddique argued that DSA should focus on winning governing power. In 2024, Siddique argued that DSA must identify where DSA's electoral project will succeed and build "five-year and longer-term program[s]" to win.

In December 2023, Siddique joined a five-day hunger strike outside the White House calling for a cease-fire in Gaza, alongside DSA members including Zohran Mamdani, Rashida Tlaib, Cori Bush, and Cynthia Nixon. In March 2025, Siddique spoke at a protest for detained pro-Palestine activist Mahmoud Khalil outside Thurgood Marshall United States Courthouse. In April 2025, Siddique described the detention of pro-Palestinian activists and student protesters as an "alarming step in the direction of authoritarianism" in the United States. In July 2025, Siddique and DSA rejected US representative Andy Ogles' call to denaturalize Mamdani as "xenophobia and Islamophobia".

In August 2024, Siddique spoke at the March on the DNC.

In July 2025, after Zohran Mamdani's win in the Democratic primary for Mayor of New York City, Siddique took the 9–10 a.m. slot on C-SPAN's Washington Journal to speak about DSA and democratic socialism. In November, Siddique argued that DSA's rapid growth and Mamdani's general election win proves the popularity of "democratic socialist ideas" and "the hunger for a real alternative to the status quo", which "the Democratic party has not really presented". Siddique highlighted that Mamdani first entered politics in 2017 to canvass for a pro-Palestine New York City Council candidate. In December 2025, Siddique criticized Mamdani's retention of Jessica Tisch as Police Commissioner.

In October 2025, co-chairs Siddique and Romer visited Stockholm for a meeting with the Swedish Left Party, German Die Linke and Norwegian Socialist Left Party. Siddique praised Claudia Sheinbaum's presidency in Mexico and hoped to field a similarly successful DSA candidate in the 2028 US presidential election.

== Personal life ==
Siddique grew up in Brooklyn, New York City, in a Bangladeshi Muslim family.

== See also ==
- National Priorities Project
- Green New Deal
