= State tax =

State tax may refer to:

- Taxes imposed by U.S. states
  - State income tax
  - State sales tax
  - State tax levels in the United States
- Taxes imposed by Indian states
  - Taxation in India#State governments
- Taxes imposed by sovereign states
  - List of countries by tax rates

== See also ==
- Category:State taxation in the United States
