= Tim Wigley =

American lobbyist

Tim Wigley is an American lobbyist working primarily on resource and environmental issues. He is Executive Vice President of PAC/WEST Communications. He was formerly the president of the Oregon Forest Industries Council and worked as director of communications for pulp and paper company Georgia-Pacific. Wigley led the group Project Protect, which supported the Healthy Forests Initiative. He received a Bachelor's degree in Political Science from Southwestern Oklahoma State University, and is also a graduate of The American Campaign Academy in Washington, D.C.

== Criticism ==
Wigley has been criticised for his alleged use of Astroturfing techniques in relation to the establishment of groups such as Project Protect and Save Our Species Alliance
