= List of conventions of the Democratic Socialists of America =

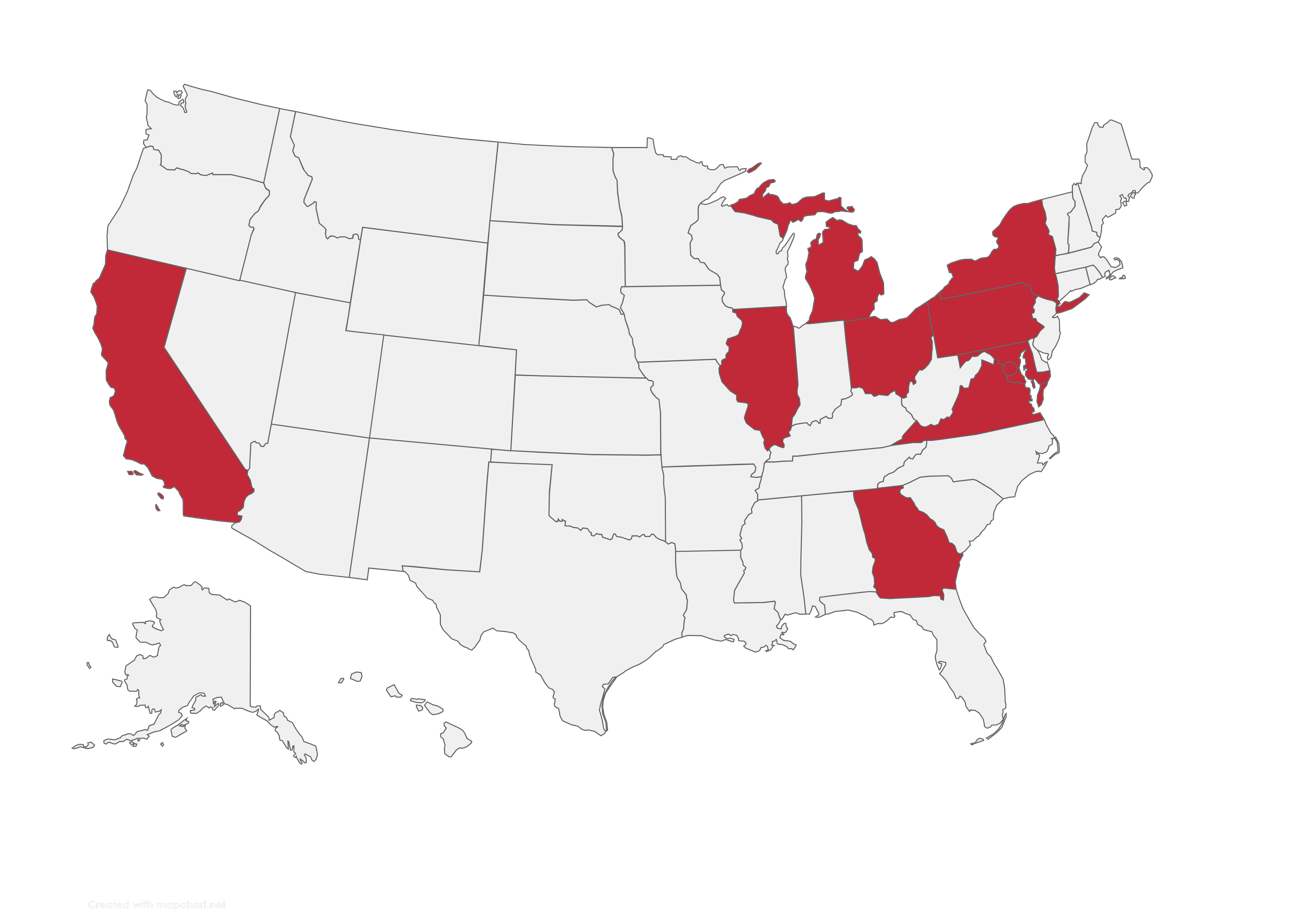
A map of states that have hosted a Democratic Socialists of America convention

The National Convention of the Democratic Socialists of America (DSA) is the highest governing body of DSA. The convention sets political priorities for the following term; it elects the National Political Committee (NPC), the political and administrative leadership of the DSA; and elects the DSA's two National Co-Chairs.

The National Political Committee and the Co-Chairs are elected via single transferrable vote. The convention re-created the Co-Chairs position in 2023, and has twice elected Ashik Siddique and Megan Romer.

Each chapter elects convention delegates from their general membership. Chapters are allocated a number of delegates proportional to their membership, often around 1 delegate per 60 members. Conventions are held every two years. Special conventions can be held at any time, but no special conventions have been called in DSA's history. DSA conventions use the latest edition of Robert's Rules of Order, Newly Revised, for their parliamentary authority.

== List of conventions ==
Dates	Location	Delegates	Reports	Notes
March 20–21, 1982	Detroit, Michigan			The founding convention of the DSA, merger of NAM and DSOC.
October 14–16, 1983	New York City, New York			400 delegates & observers attended the 1983 convention.
November 8–11, 1985	Berkeley, California			Cornel West spoke at the 1985 convention.
December 4–6, 1987	Washington, D.C.			The 1987 convention endorsed Jesse Jackson for president. Jackson requested DSA not endorse him.
November 10–12, 1989	Baltimore, Maryland		Main report	This convention was the first convention to be held after the death of Michael Harrington, founder of DSOC and DSA.
November 8–11, 1991	Chicago, Illinois			
November 11–14, 1993	Manhattan Beach, California			The 1993 convention endorsed the statehood of Washington D.C.
November 10–12, 1995	Chevy Chase, Maryland			DSA hosted a "Breaking Bread" event hosted by DSA honorary co-chairs Cornel West and Barbara Ehrenreich with 500-600 attendees. The 1995 convention proposed a socialist think-tank to promote model legislation, akin to the American Legislative Exchange Council.
November 7–9, 1997	Columbus, Ohio			
November 11–14, 1999	San Diego, California			
November 9–11, 2001	Philadelphia, Pennsylvania			Convention passed a resolution condemning the September 11, 2001 attacks while condemning restrictions on civil liberties in the name of fighting terrorism, and racist scapegoating of Arab Americans and American Muslims.
November 14–16, 2003	Detroit, Michigan		Main report; Outgoing NPC report	
November 11–13, 2005	Los Angeles, California			
November 9–11, 2007	Atlanta, Georgia		Outgoing NPC report	Bernie Sanders and Bill Fletcher spoke at the 2007 convention to an audience of 300.
November 13–15, 2009	Evanston, Illinois			Harold Meyerson and Kim Bobo spoke at the 2009 convention. The convention discussed issues such as how DSA and the rest of the country should respond to the Great Recession, and health care.
November 11–13, 2011	Vienna, Virginia	about 100	Main report; Minutes	The 2011 Convention was held under a banner proclaiming "Obama is No Socialist, But We Are". The 2011 Convention voted to support Occupy Wall Street and to formalize DSA's support for gay liberation and LGBTQ rights.
October 24–27, 2013	Emeryville, California	about 100	Director's report; Priorities report	1/3 of the delegates were under 35, a major shift for previously elder-dominated DSA.
November 13–15, 2015	Bolivar, Pennsylvania	about 120	Main report	The 2015 Convention failed a resolution to exit the Socialist International. Convention programming included panels on how DSA should orient itself around the 2016 Bernie Sanders campaign for president and how DSA can diversify its membership.
August 4–6, 2017	Chicago, Illinois	over 800	Minutes	Over 100 chapters sent delegates. The 2017 Convention voted to exit the Socialist International, endorse the BDS movement, and adopt explicit anti-Zionism. The convention was the first convention since Donald Trump's election as president, and DSA saw massive growth as a result. The position of honorary chair was removed.
August 4–6, 2019	Atlanta, Georgia	1,056	Main report; Director's report	The 2019 Convention was the largest decision-making convention of socialists in the United States since the 1940s. The 2019 Convention voted to endorse the Green New Deal and to demand decriminalization of sex work. The 2019 Convention passed a resolution that, if Bernie Sanders did not win the Democratic presidential nomination, DSA would not endorse any other candidate in the presidential election.
August 1–8, 2021	Virtual due to COVID, held on Zoom	1,436	DemLeft issue; Director's report; Minutes	176 chapters sent delegates. The 2021 Convention voted to affiliate with the São Paulo Forum.
August 4–6, 2023	Chicago, Illinois	1,082	DemLeft issue; Director's report	DSA passes a resolution to merge its BDS Working Group into its International Committee and recommit to anti-Zionism and solidarity with the Palestinian struggle. Zohran Mamdani was the keynote speaker.
August 8–10, 2025	Chicago, Illinois	1,200+	DemLeft issue; Compendium and Minutes	DSA passes a resolution to follow the principles of Thawabit, conditions endorsements on anti-Zionism, and makes Zionism an expellable offense. DSA votes to explore the feasibility of running its own presidential candidate in 2028. DSA votes to pass an omnibus of structural reforms including expanding it's governing body, the National Political Committee (DSA). Rashida Tlaib was the keynote speaker. The NYC-DSA choir led the singing of The Internationale to end the convention.

== See also ==
- Democratic National Convention
- Green National Convention
- National conventions of the Communist Party USA
