= Federal taxation and spending by state =

Ability of the United States government to tax and spend

The ability of the United States government to tax and spend in specific regions has large implications to economic activity and performance. Taxes are indexed to wages and profits and therefore areas of high taxation are correlated with areas of higher per capita income and more economic activity.

Spending is largely focused on areas of poverty, the elderly, and centers of federal employment such as military bases.

== Background ==
The ability of the government to tax and spend in specific regions has large implications to economic activity and performance. The main question behind this issue stems into three different approaches. First, federal spending should be neutral, meaning federal taxation should roughly equal expenditures. Second, it should be redistributive, meaning rich states should be taxed most heavily and poorer states should receive more benefits. Third, spending and taxation should be accidental per se, meaning higher taxation should be performed based on income but with little relation to geographic region and spending should be done where it allows for the most efficiency. The main issue driving this research is the question between equity and equality (Leonard and Walder, Page 17).

Typically, it is seen taxes are highly indexed to wages and therefore places of high taxation are geographically found in areas with higher per capita income. The problem with taxation indexed to wages is that it does not consider cost of living. In areas with higher per capita income, it is highly likely that the cost of living is also higher; for instance, this is the case in New York. The effect of not indexing to costs of living makes some states look wealthier compared to others. It is typical that states with low costs of living receive more in spending than states with high costs of living (Leonard and Walder, Page 19). After discounting income with costs of living, New York's poverty level increases a significant amount (Pear, Page 2). The significance level between high levels of poverty and high taxation may be arguable.

Spending is not so easily located geographically. The breakdown of federal spending is done in the following ways: defense (military), non-defense discretionary, Social Security, Medicare, grants, and various other programs. Defense spending is the most volatile, as it is usually found to be higher in states with established defense contractors and other defense facilities. Areas of higher social insurance spending are typically seen in areas of larger elderly population. Social security is the dominant expenditure of per dollar federal expenditures.

Other factors of spending are largely political in the sense that politicians who can effectively argue for more spending get the most spending for their states. Some trends of spending as of 1999 are as follows: defense spending in the South and the national capital, non-defense discretionary spending between the Midwest and the Rockies, most Medicare and Social Security is located in the East and Central/Midwest, and other assistance programs following the Appalachian Mountains from Louisiana/Mississippi to Maine (Leonard and Walder, Page 30).

== Federal spending by state as of FY 2013 ==
Through fiscal year 2010, the Census Bureau produced the annual Consolidated Federal Funds Report, tracking Federal expenditures both geographically and by agency and program. As of 2011, funding for the Federal Financial Statistics program, of which the CFFR was part, was cut from the Federal budget. Private organizations such as the National Priorities Project and The Pew Charitable Trusts have since developed their own reports. (The tables below are from the 2014 Pew report.)

=== Total federal spending in millions of dollars, by state, federal fiscal 2013 ===
| State federal district or territory | Retirement benefits | Nonretirement benefits | Grants | Contracts | Salaries and wages | Total |
|---|---|---|---|---|---|---|
| United States | $1,061,181 | $870,048 | $506,475 | $407,277 | $303,990 | $3,148,971 |
| Alabama | $20,923 | $14,662 | $6,155 | $9,668 | $5,355 | $56,762 |
| Alaska | $2,073 | $1,589 | $2,649 | $1,628 | $2,628 | $10,568 |
| Arizona | $22,360 | $18,262 | $9,058 | $12,350 | $5,275 | $67,306 |
| Arkansas | $11,865 | $8,315 | $5,484 | $944 | $1,906 | $28,514 |
| California | $101,841 | $98,526 | $66,693 | $47,657 | $29,008 | $343,725 |
| Colorado | $16,020 | $10,896 | $7,092 | $8,013 | $6,641 | $48,664 |
| Connecticut | $11,646 | $10,527 | $7,047 | $10,401 | $1,831 | $41,452 |
| Delaware | $3,673 | $2,668 | $1,742 | $272 | $692 | $9,047 |
| District of Columbia | $3,116 | $1,867 | $4,963 | $16,784 | $21,056 | $47,785 |
| Florida | $76,959 | $66,541 | $19,062 | $14,089 | $14,180 | $190,831 |
| Georgia | $31,894 | $25,590 | $11,625 | $7,625 | $11,797 | $88,532 |
| Hawaii | $5,336 | $3,444 | $2,881 | $1,898 | $5,750 | $19,309 |
| Idaho | $5,440 | $3,629 | $2,377 | $2,574 | $1,118 | $15,139 |
| Illinois | $38,047 | $35,761 | $17,614 | $6,497 | $7,565 | $105,483 |
| Indiana | $22,338 | $17,623 | $9,434 | $3,140 | $2,961 | $55,496 |
| Iowa | $10,461 | $7,697 | $4,783 | $1,600 | $1,341 | $25,883 |
| Kansas | $9,854 | $7,267 | $1,888 | $1,720 | $3,514 | $24,243 |
| Kentucky | $16,765 | $13,003 | $6,604 | $6,436 | $5,219 | $48,027 |
| Louisiana | $14,740 | $13,849 | $9,019 | $3,437 | $3,656 | $44,701 |
| Maine | $5,610 | $3,976 | $3,186 | $2,079 | $1,227 | $16,078 |
| Maryland | $23,739 | $15,129 | $9,950 | $25,598 | $18,570 | $92,987 |
| Massachusetts | $21,146 | $20,795 | $15,039 | $14,572 | $4,077 | $75,631 |
| Michigan | $37,086 | $31,458 | $16,488 | $4,810 | $4,173 | $94,014 |
| Minnesota | $16,866 | $12,757 | $9,051 | $3,045 | $2,585 | $44,304 |
| Mississippi | $11,134 | $9,516 | $5,153 | $5,786 | $2,719 | $34,308 |
| Missouri | $22,206 | $16,613 | $11,566 | $9,933 | $5,135 | $65,452 |
| Montana | $3,933 | $2,392 | $2,272 | $443 | $1,109 | $10,148 |
| Nebraska | $6,231 | $4,300 | $2,539 | $968 | $1,598 | $15,636 |
| Nevada | $8,694 | $6,830 | $2,721 | $2,884 | $2,052 | $23,181 |
| New Hampshire | $5,096 | $3,229 | $1,649 | $1,788 | $653 | $12,414 |
| New Jersey | $28,547 | $27,645 | $15,393 | $6,442 | $4,546 | $82,573 |
| New Mexico | $7,710 | $5,471 | $4,690 | $6,696 | $2,987 | $27,554 |
| New York | $61,170 | $59,858 | $52,863 | $10,744 | $10,700 | $195,334 |
| North Carolina | $35,810 | $27,085 | $14,202 | $4,954 | $11,856 | $93,907 |
| North Dakota | $2,215 | $1,499 | $1,566 | $490 | $1,035 | $6,805 |
| Ohio | $39,271 | $33,182 | $16,221 | $6,265 | $6,633 | $101,573 |
| Oklahoma | $14,606 | $10,148 | $6,400 | $2,031 | $4,666 | $37,851 |
| Oregon | $14,355 | $10,490 | $4,515 | $1,123 | $2,231 | $32,713 |
| Pennsylvania | $48,861 | $40,341 | $21,898 | $16,181 | $7,707 | $134,989 |
| Rhode Island | $3,819 | $3,420 | $2,410 | $767 | $1,134 | $11,549 |
| South Carolina | $19,388 | $13,637 | $5,695 | $5,440 | $4,624 | $48,784 |
| South Dakota | $2,963 | $1,984 | $1,558 | $565 | $955 | $8,025 |
| Tennessee | $24,307 | $19,083 | $9,378 | $7,641 | $4,100 | $64,508 |
| Texas | $72,354 | $64,922 | $35,184 | $39,051 | $22,947 | $234,459 |
| Utah | $7,095 | $5,049 | $3,516 | $2,237 | $2,723 | $20,620 |
| Vermont | $2,359 | $1,729 | $1,888 | $393 | $546 | $6,915 |
| Virginia | $34,719 | $17,910 | $9,081 | $51,186 | $25,133 | $138,029 |
| Washington | $24,551 | $16,688 | $10,541 | $11,736 | $9,422 | $72,937 |
| West Virginia | $8,485 | $5,855 | $3,992 | $1,153 | $1,831 | $21,317 |
| Wisconsin | $19,570 | $14,181 | $8,623 | $3,224 | $2,137 | $47,735 |
| Wyoming | $1,935 | $1,157 | $1,081 | $317 | $687 | $5,177 |

=== Per capita federal spending, by state, federal fiscal 2013 ===
| State federal district or territory | Retirement benefits | Nonretirement benefits | Grants | Contracts | Salaries and wages | Total |
|---|---|---|---|---|---|---|
| United States | $3,357 | $2,752 | $1,602 | $1,288 | $962 | $9,961 |
| Alabama | $4,329 | $3,033 | $1,273 | $2,000 | $1,108 | $11,743 |
| Alaska | $2,820 | $2,162 | $3,604 | $2,215 | $3,575 | $14,375 |
| Arizona | $3,374 | $2,756 | $1,367 | $1,864 | $796 | $10,157 |
| Arkansas | $4,009 | $2,810 | $1,853 | $319 | $644 | $9,635 |
| California | $2,657 | $2,570 | $1,740 | $1,243 | $757 | $8,967 |
| Colorado | $3,041 | $2,068 | $1,346 | $1,521 | $1,261 | $9,237 |
| Connecticut | $3,238 | $2,927 | $1,960 | $2,892 | $509 | $11,527 |
| Delaware | $3,967 | $2,882 | $1,882 | $294 | $748 | $9,773 |
| District of Columbia | $4,820 | $2,887 | $7,678 | $25,963 | $32,572 | $73,920 |
| Florida | $3,936 | $3,403 | $975 | $721 | $725 | $9,760 |
| Georgia | $3,192 | $2,561 | $1,163 | $763 | $1,181 | $8,860 |
| Hawaii | $3,801 | $2,453 | $2,052 | $1,351 | $4,095 | $13,752 |
| Idaho | $3,375 | $2,251 | $1,474 | $1,597 | $693 | $9,390 |
| Illinois | $2,953 | $2,776 | $1,367 | $504 | $587 | $8,188 |
| Indiana | $3,400 | $2,682 | $1,436 | $478 | $451 | $8,446 |
| Iowa | $3,385 | $2,491 | $1,548 | $518 | $434 | $8,375 |
| Kansas | $3,405 | $2,511 | $652 | $594 | $1,214 | $8,377 |
| Kentucky | $3,814 | $2,958 | $1,502 | $1,464 | $1,188 | $10,927 |
| Louisiana | $3,187 | $2,994 | $1,950 | $743 | $790 | $9,664 |
| Maine | $4,223 | $2,993 | $2,399 | $1,565 | $924 | $12,104 |
| Maryland | $4,004 | $2,552 | $1,678 | $4,318 | $3,132 | $15,684 |
| Massachusetts | $3,160 | $3,107 | $2,247 | $2,177 | $609 | $11,300 |
| Michigan | $3,748 | $3,179 | $1,666 | $486 | $422 | $9,501 |
| Minnesota | $3,112 | $2,354 | $1,670 | $562 | $477 | $8,174 |
| Mississippi | $3,722 | $3,181 | $1,723 | $1,934 | $909 | $11,469 |
| Missouri | $3,674 | $2,749 | $1,914 | $1,643 | $850 | $10,829 |
| Montana | $3,874 | $2,356 | $2,238 | $436 | $1,092 | $9,996 |
| Nebraska | $3,335 | $2,301 | $1,359 | $518 | $855 | $8,368 |
| Nevada | $3,116 | $2,448 | $975 | $1,033 | $735 | $8,308 |
| New Hampshire | $3,850 | $2,440 | $1,246 | $1,351 | $493 | $9,380 |
| New Jersey | $3,208 | $3,106 | $1,730 | $724 | $511 | $9,279 |
| New Mexico | $3,697 | $2,624 | $2,249 | $3,211 | $1,432 | $13,213 |
| New York | $3,113 | $3,046 | $2,690 | $547 | $544 | $9,940 |
| North Carolina | $3,636 | $2,750 | $1,442 | $503 | $1,204 | $9,536 |
| North Dakota | $3,062 | $2,072 | $2,165 | $678 | $1,430 | $9,407 |
| Ohio | $3,394 | $2,868 | $1,402 | $541 | $573 | $8,778 |
| Oklahoma | $3,793 | $2,636 | $1,662 | $528 | $1,212 | $9,830 |
| Oregon | $3,653 | $2,669 | $1,149 | $286 | $568 | $8,324 |
| Pennsylvania | $3,825 | $3,158 | $1,714 | $1,267 | $603 | $10,568 |
| Rhode Island | $3,632 | $3,252 | $2,292 | $729 | $1,078 | $10,984 |
| South Carolina | $4,060 | $2,856 | $1,193 | $1,139 | $968 | $10,217 |
| South Dakota | $3,507 | $2,348 | $1,844 | $669 | $1,131 | $9,499 |
| Tennessee | $3,742 | $2,938 | $1,444 | $1,176 | $631 | $9,930 |
| Texas | $2,736 | $2,455 | $1,330 | $1,477 | $868 | $8,865 |
| Utah | $2,446 | $1,740 | $1,212 | $771 | $939 | $7,108 |
| Vermont | $3,764 | $2,760 | $3,013 | $628 | $871 | $11,036 |
| Virginia | $4,203 | $2,168 | $1,099 | $6,197 | $3,043 | $16,710 |
| Washington | $3,522 | $2,394 | $1,512 | $1,683 | $1,351 | $10,462 |
| West Virginia | $4,576 | $3,158 | $2,153 | $622 | $988 | $11,496 |
| Wisconsin | $3,408 | $2,469 | $1,502 | $561 | $372 | $8,312 |
| Wyoming | $3,321 | $1,986 | $1,856 | $544 | $1,178 | $8,885 |

== Trends ==
Chart comparing effective total (federal and state and local) tax rates in the United States, of the richest Americans and those in the bottom 50% of earners

The balance of payments receipts has typically remained fairly stable over the past fifteen years with limited changes between those states with net benefits and those with net contributions. The Fisc states that the federal deficit increased due to human resource expenditures, increased tax cuts, and increased military expenditure during the 1980s. The Fisc further reports that in expectations and defense spending declined in the 1990s one would expect the expenditure per state to decrease along with the government. However, some states, such as Kentucky, Idaho and Oklahoma, actually saw large increases in defense spending, which increased their BOP. Overall, though, increases in non-defense spending were not on the same magnitude as the decline of defense spending (Leonard and Walder, Page 36–39).

The report argues that defense and Social Security and Medicare have a small negative correlation, and as a result large reductions in defense spending do not bode well for increases in spending on Social Security or Medicare. Defense expenditures tend to be the most volatile over time and state, however, total expenditures are roughly constant, which means that increases (decreases) in defense correlate with decreases (increases) in other non-defense and non- social insurance expenditures. Income taxes used to finance expenditures are not extremely volatile around the national average.

=== Changes in expenditure ===
Decrease in defense expenditure has been a large key to overall changes in expenditure, both in salaries for bases and for procurement of defense. Due to restructuring or closing military bases, as determined by the Base Closure and Realignment Commission, most states have incurred declines in defense spending via salaries. California, with 24 recommendations for closure or realignment, has had the largest decline in defense spending, which attributes to a loss of roughly $50 billion, given the population increase since the early 1980s. Most states have also seen decline in procurement defense spending, but eight states have seen it increase, and in Kentucky's case it has doubled (Leonard and Walder, Page 36-39, 44-47).

Social Security has increased in expenditure primarily in the Southern states. It was thought that since the largest expenditure is retirement aid that social security expenditure was following the elderly. However, this was not the case, as the data did not correlate between elderly population and increases in social security expenditure. Further expenditures in social security are caused by the increase in disability insurance. The Fisc argues that the later policy changes in the 1980s involving beneficiary eligibility may have a time lag, meaning the causes of those changes are just now being felt. Medicare costs have continued to increase as well as the population ages and as health care costs increase. Most of the increased expenditure has been seen in the south. Grants have increased, but have been relatively stable over the fifteen-year period taken into consideration. The largest increase has been in the form of Medicaid expenditures (Leonard and Walder, Page 47-54).

The changes in taxes have remained fairly stable over time, and are strongly correlated with income per capita per state. It follows that as state's per capita income rises, its tax receipt also increases. The data between changes in per capita taxes to the national averages in ratio to the changes in the per capita income to the national average has a correlation of .88 (Leonard and Walder, Page 56-57).

== History of federal monitoring of taxation and spending by state ==
The monitoring of federal spending and taxation and its variation between states in the United States began in 1977 under a query run by Daniel Patrick Moynihan, Democratic senator of New York. The query was designed to determine whether the state of New York was paying more in taxes than it was receiving in federal spending. The determination is made by looking at an individual state's balance of payments (BOP), which is total income minus outlays.

Initially, many thought New York was a net gainer, receiving more funding than it was paying out in taxes, because of large payments to the Federal Reserve Bank of New York, but in actuality, those payments were interest payments on the United States federal debt, which were distributed to foreign individuals and governments for purchasing of US Treasury bonds (Leonard and Walder, Page 9). After separating those expenditures from actual expenditures in New York, it was found that the state was actually a donor. This event stimulated more controversy over the topic of spending and taxation.

After the Federal Community Services Administration noticed the flaw in the balance of payments in New York, it revised its data and provided the revised data under the title The Geographical Distribution of Federal Expenditures, which was used in determining the expenditures for this analysis. This is now entitled "the Fisc".

== Politics and controversy of unequal contributions by states to the federal budget ==
The US Constitution requires that direct taxes be apportioned to the states according to their population, so that per capita revenues from the states would be equal. Indirect taxes do not have this restriction. After a US Supreme Court case held that an income tax on income derived from property was in the same category as a direct tax on property, the 16th amendment was passed to allow indirect taxation on income in proportion to their income, from what ever source. Since that time, taxation as well as spending per capita has ranged widely between the states. At the same time, one of the great controversies of national politics has become whether to increase or decrease federal spending and the size of the federal government, with Republicans largely in favor of decreasing its size and Democrats pushing to keep it the same or increase it.

Several commentators have pointed out that the states that benefit the most by federal spending are the very states whose populations tend to vote for leaders who promise to reduce federal spending, while those that benefit the least from large government vote for politicians who promise to make it even larger at their expense. In other words, Democratic-leaning states tend to be net contributors to the federal budget while Republican-leaning states are more often net recipients of federal spending. At the same time, Democratic-leaning states tend to be rated as having higher GINI inequality indexes while Republican states correlate with lower inequality index measurements. Various explanations for these seemingly contradictory situations exist, including fear of expanded federal spending jeopardizing the financial solvency of already existing programs; Democratic states generally being more urban and higher income, with Republican states with large metropolitan areas and higher incomes including Florida and Texas being net contributors as well; those in states with more government spending witnessing waste, fraud and abuse firsthand, leading to more skepticism; military spending generally not being targeted for budget cuts by Republicans; and more working-class state residents less able to bear additional taxation than wealthier state residents with higher disposable incomes.

== See also ==
- Federal tax revenue by state
- Demographics of the United States
- United States federal budget

US taxation:

- Sales taxes in the United States
- State income tax
- State tax levels
- Taxation in the United States
