= National Political Committee =

Democratic Socialists of America governing body

Type
- Type: Governing body of the Democratic Socialists of America

Structure
- Seats: 27
- Political groups: Bread & Roses (5); Groundwork (5); Socialist Majority (4); Springs of Revolution (4); Red Star (3); Marxist Unity (3); Carnation (1); Reform & Revolution (1); Libertarian Socialist (1)
- Length of term: 2 years, excluding the YDSA co-chairs, who have a term of 1 year

Elections
- Voting system: 25 members elected by the National Convention using the single transferable vote; 2 members selected by the youth section
- Last election: August 8–10, 2025
- Next election: 2027

Constitution
- dsausa.org/about-us/constitution

The National Political Committee (NPC) is the principal governing body of the Democratic Socialists of America (DSA) between meetings of the organization's national convention. The body is elected every two years by delegates to the national convention. It is made up of 27 members, of which 25 are elected by DSA chapter delegates, who are themselves elected by their chapters' members using the single transferable vote.

Fourteen of the committee seats are reserved for members who are not men, and 8 are reserved for members of color. The co-chairs of the Young Democratic Socialists of America (YDSA) serve as NPC members, and are elected at YDSA convention held annually, which can result in shifts in political makeup of the NPC in the middle of the committee's two-year term.

The NPC elects its own steering committee, consisting of the National Co-Chairs and seven members elected at-large by the National Political Committee, two of whom are selected to serve as the treasurer and as the secretary.

== History ==
DSA's 2023 National Convention re-instated the office of National Co-Chairs to be directly elected by DSA's National Convention as public-facing national figureheads who would also take up two seats on the NPC. This replaced the previous office of National Political Committee Co-Chairs which had little public-facing role and were elected by the NPC from among themselves.

Following a failed attempt by Socialist Majority Caucus to expand the number of seats of the NPC in 2023, the 2025 DSA National Convention passed an omnibus of structural reforms proposed by DSA's Democracy Commission which included expanding the National Political Committee. The 2025–2027 NPC thus expanded from 17 seats, one of which was split by the Co-Chairs of the Young Democratic Socialists of America (YDSA), to 27 seats, the YDSA Co-Chairs now each having one full vote. The reforms passed with wide approval across DSA's political spectrum despite opposition and attempts to remove NPC expansion from the Democracy Commission Omnibus by Red Star and Libertarian Socialist Caucus.

At the 2023 DSA National Convention, elections for the National Political Committee resulted in what some DSA members called a "leftward shift" in leadership. A coalition of caucuses which position themselves as the organization's revolutionary left, including Red Star, Marxist Unity Group, Bread and Roses, and the Anti-Zionist Slate (renamed Springs of Revolution in 2025) won a majority of seats, displacing the previous governing coalition led by Socialist Majority and Groundwork caucuses. The NPC has been described as having matured into a "multi-caucus parliament", where building majority blocs requires negotiation and persuasion among the different tendencies.

The 2025 convention saw a similar result, the "left-wing" caucuses retained a majority, joined by representatives from Reform and Revolution and Libertarian Socialist Caucus. Despite the DSA caucuses which make up this majority claiming the 2023 and 2025 convention results as a clear victory for DSA's internal left-wing the actual reality of NPC governance has been more complex, on individual issues majorities frequently shift and are as likely to include "right-wing" caucuses such as Groundwork and Socialist Majority Caucus as they are to include "left-wing" groupings such as Springs of Revolution and Red Star.

== Caucuses ==
=== Electoral strategies ===
Caucuses in the DSA are divided over electoral strategies, and each caucus often adopts one or more particular strategies as a "Point of Unity" that defines the caucus's goals.

- The party surrogate strategy prioritizes expanding the DSA's power and institutions independent of the Democratic Party, while continuing to use the advantages of the Democratic Party ballot line when those advantages exist.
- The dirty break strategy is similar to the "party surrogate" strategy of using the Democratic Party ballot line while building up DSA independently. However, it places a greater emphasis on the necessity and inevitability of a future "break" with the Democratic Party.
- The realignment strategy involves working explicitly as a faction within the Democratic Party, with the long-term goal of shifting the party to adopt more social democratic or socialist principles. This was the DSA's historical position before it reshaped after Bernie Sanders' 2016 campaign and was advocated by DSA's founder, Michael Harrington. None of the caucuses currently represented on the NPC advocate for realignment.
- The clean break strategy calls for immediately ending all use of the Democratic ballot line and only running candidates independently or third-party. Some clean break advocates also demand the immediate expulsion of all DSA elected officials from the organization. None of the caucuses represented on the NPC support a clean break.

=== Caucuses currently represented on the NPC ===
Caucus	Ideology and orientation	Electoral strategy	Seats	Website
Bread & Roses	Marxism; Structural reform Rank-and-file labor strategy	Dirty break	5 / 27	breadandrosesdsa.org
Groundwork	Ecosocialism; Structural reform	Party surrogate	5 / 27	groundworkdsa.com
Socialist Majority Caucus	Mass politics Popular front Structural reform	Party surrogate	4 / 27	socialistmajority.com
Springs of Revolution	Hardline anti-Zionism		4 / 27	sordsa.org
Red Star	Marxism–Leninism	Party surrogate	3 / 27	redstarcaucus.org
Marxist Unity Group	Orthodox Marxism; Democratic centralism	Party surrogate	3 / 27	marxistunity.com
Carnation			1 / 27	sites.google.com/view/carnation-program
Reform & Revolution	Trotskyism; United front	Dirty break	1 / 27	reformandrevolution.org
Libertarian Socialist Caucus	Libertarian socialism Anti-statism; Dual power		1 / 27	dsa-lsc.org

=== Caucuses previously represented on the NPC ===
Caucus	Status	Ideology and orientation	Electoral strategy	Website
Build (Note: In 2017, Praxis.)	Defunct	Organizational decentralization		dsabuild.org (archived)
North Star (Note: In 2015, Reflect Act Decide. In 2017, Unity Through Diversity Network.)	Active	Harringtonism; Popular front	Realignment	dsanorthstar.org
Collective Power Network	Defunct	Organizational centralization Organize-the-unorganized labor strategy	Party surrogate	dsaorganizer.org (archived)
Constellation	Active	Organizational centralization	Party surrogate	dsaconstellation.com
Renewal	Defunct			dsarenewal.org (archived)

=== Historical composition ===
The table below shows caucused members of the National Political Committee from 2015 to present:

Caucus	2015	2017	2019	2021	2023	2024	2025	2026
Bread & Roses (Note: In 2015, Left Caucus. In 2017, Momentum.)	4 / 17	6 / 17	5 / 17	3 / 17	3 / 17	3.5 / 17	3 / 27	5 / 27
Build		5 / 17	2 / 17					
Carnation							1 / 27	
Collective Power Network			1 / 17					
Constellation					0.5 / 17			
Groundwork (Note: In 2021, the Green New Deal Slate.)				3 / 17	4 / 17		5 / 27	
Libertarian Socialist Caucus (Note: In 2017, Friends and Comrades slate.)		1 / 17	2 / 17	1 / 17			1 / 27	
Marxist Unity Group					2 / 17		3 / 27	
North Star	3 / 17	4 / 17						
Red Star			1 / 17	1 / 17	3 / 17		3 / 27	
Reform & Revolution							2 / 27	1 / 27
Renewal			1 / 17	1 / 17				
Socialist Majority Caucus			4 / 17	3 / 17	2 / 17		4 / 27	
Springs of Revolution (Note: In 2023, as Anti-Zionist Slate.)					1 / 17		4 / 27	
References								
Y: Prior to the 2025 DSA Convention, the Co-Chairs of the Young Democratic Socialists (of America) received only 0.5 votes each on the NPC.

== Current members ==
Name	Caucus	Chapter	Role	Steering Committee
Megan Romer	Red Star	DSA SWLA At-large	DSA Co-Chair	Yes
Ashik Siddique	Groundwork	Wilmington DSA	DSA Co-Chair	Yes
Christian Araos	Socialist Majority	Long Island DSA		
Eleanor Babaev	Groundwork	NYC-DSA		
Hayley Banyai-Becker	Bread & Roses	Portland DSA		
Mae Bracelin	Bread & Roses		YDSA Co-Chair	
Sidney Carlson White	Marxist Unity Group	NYC-DSA		
Jeremy Cohan	Socialist Majority	NYC-DSA		
Cliff Connolly	Marxist Unity Group	Orlando DSA		Yes
Kareem Elrefai	Groundwork	NYC-DSA		
Cerena Ermitanio	Bread & Roses	Houston DSA		
Abdullah Farooq	Carnation	DSA-LA		
Frances Gill	Groundwork	DSA-LA		
James Hernandez	Bread & Roses	Miami DSA	YDSA Co-Chair	
Ahmed Husain	Springs of Revolution	NYC-DSA		
David Jenkins	Libertarian Socialist Caucus	NYC-DSA	Secretary	Yes
John Lewis	Red Star	New Orleans DSA	Treasurer	Yes
Francesca Maria	Springs of Revolution	CT DSA		
Luisa Martínez	Springs of Revolution	Portland		
Sarah Milner	Reform & Revolution	Portland DSA		
Clayton Ryles	Socialist Majority	DSA-LA		
Katie Sims	Socialist Majority	Ithaca DSA		Yes
Ella Teevan	Bread & Roses	Seattle DSA		Yes
Andrew Thompson	Springs of Revolution	Denver DSA		Yes
Cara Tobe	Groundwork	Metro Detroit DSA		
Amy Wilhelm	Marxist Unity Group	Seattle DSA		
Hazel Williams	Red Star	DSA SF		
Additional sources:

== Past members ==
=== 2025–2027 National Political Committee ===
Name	Caucus	Chapter	Role	Steering Committee
Daniel Salup-Cid	Reform & Revolution		YDSA Co-Chair (2025-2026)	Yes
Sara Almosawi	Uncaucused		YDSA Co-Chair (2025-2026)	
Additional sources:

=== 2023–2025 National Political Committee ===
Name	Caucus	Chapter	Role	Steering Committee
Ashik Siddique	Groundwork	Wilmington DSA	National Co-Chair	Yes
Megan Romer	Red Star	Syracuse DSA	National Co-Chair	Yes
Rose DuBois	Groundwork	Maine DSA		
Ahmed Husain	Anti-Zionist Slate			
Amy Wilhelm	Marxist Unity Group	Seattle DSA	Interim Secretary	Yes
Rashad X	Marxist Unity Group		Secretary	Yes
Cara Tobe	Groundwork	Louisville DSA		
Renée Paradis	Socialist Majority	East Bay DSA		Yes
Colleen Johnston	Socialist Majority	Denver DSA		
Sam Heft-Luthy	Red Star	DSA SF		
Alex Pellitteri	Bread & Roses	NYC-DSA		Yes
Laura Wadlin	Bread & Roses	Portland DSA		
Frances Gill	Groundwork	DSA-LA		
Kristin Schall	Bread & Roses	Mid-Hudson Valley DSA		
John Lewis	Red Star	New Orleans DSA	Treasurer	Yes
Luisa Martínez	Uncaucused	Portland DSA		
Aron Ali-McClory	Constellation		YDSA Co-Chair	Yes
Evan Caldwell	Uncaucused		YDSA Co-Chair (2023-2024)	Yes
Carlos Callejo III	Bread & Roses		YDSA Co-Chair (2024-2025)	Yes
Additional sources:
