= Federal tax revenue by state =

This is a table of the total federal tax revenue by state, federal district, and territory collected by the U.S. Internal Revenue Service.

Gross collection indicates the total federal tax revenue collected by the IRS from each U.S. state, the District of Columbia, and Puerto Rico. The figure includes all Individual federal taxes and Corporate Federal Taxes, income taxes, payroll taxes, estate taxes, gift taxes, and excise taxes. This table does not include federal tax revenue data from U.S. Armed Forces personnel stationed overseas, U.S. territories other than Puerto Rico, and U.S. citizens and legal residents living abroad, even though they may be required to pay federal taxes.

== Fiscal year 2024 ==
State federal district or territory	Gross collections (thousands of dollars)	% of total
Alabama	37,658,414	0.74%
Alaska	7,275,928	0.14%
Arizona	78,552,869	1.54%
Arkansas	42,184,263	0.83%
California	805,650,731	15.80%
Colorado	86,744,001	1.70%
Connecticut	69,406,258	1.36%
Delaware	20,531,131	0.40%
District of Columbia	45,243,625	0.89%
Florida	325,423,855	6.38%
Georgia	144,811,636	2.84%
Hawaii	11,402,789	0.22%
Idaho	17,919,350	0.35%
Illinois	222,034,635	4.35%
Indiana	83,926,517	1.65%
Iowa	35,596,231	0.70%
Kansas	31,359,032	0.61%
Kentucky	50,185,720	0.98%
Louisiana	41,884,661	0.82%
Maine	12,168,858	0.24%
Maryland	107,444,691	2.11%
Massachusetts	156,520,223	3.07%
Michigan	108,565,033	2.13%
Minnesota	122,269,773	2.40%
Mississippi	15,189,910	0.30%
Missouri	93,231,884	1.83%
Montana	10,688,526	0.21%
Nebraska	43,963,441	0.86%
Nevada	38,034,564	0.75%
New Hampshire	17,032,034	0.33%
New Jersey	183,225,841	3.59%
New Mexico	12,851,255	0.25%
New York	384,447,300	7.54%
North Carolina	125,034,536	2.45%
North Dakota	9,748,917	0.19%
Ohio	207,340,271	4.07%
Oklahoma	39,273,941	0.77%
Oregon	41,976,824	0.82%
Pennsylvania	179,329,991	3.52%
Rhode Island	18,933,872	0.37%
South Carolina	39,877,104	0.78%
South Dakota	12,770,286	0.25%
Tennessee	100,928,664	1.98%
Texas	417,434,723	8.18%
Utah	38,295,614	0.75%
Vermont	6,048,626	0.12%
Virginia	122,266,290	2.40%
Washington	161,329,983	3.16%
West Virginia	8,694,057	0.17%
Wisconsin	71,776,847	1.41%
Wyoming	7,669,217	0.15%
U.S. Armed Service members overseas and Territories other than Puerto Rico	897,380	0.02%
Puerto Rico	5,373,602	0.11%
International	17,199,324	0.34%
Undistributed [6]	4,864,430	0.10%
TOTAL	5,100,489,478	100.00%

== Fiscal year 2020 ==
This table lists the tax revenue collected from each state, plus the District of Columbia and the territory of Puerto Rico by the IRS in fiscal year 2020, which ran from October 1, 2019, through September 30, 2020. The gross collections total only reflects the revenue collected from the categories listed in the table, and not the entire revenue collected by the IRS.

State federal district or territory	Gross collections (thousands of dollars)
Alabama	26,388,492
Alaska	5,506,155
Arizona	49,306,653
Arkansas	31,673,081
California	467,417,992
Colorado	58,660,802
Connecticut	52,370,769
Delaware	20,587,021
District of Columbia	31,278,730
Florida	209,757,676
Georgia	91,396,538
Hawaii	8,818,255
Idaho	11,619,071
Illinois	156,435,157
Indiana	60,403,717
Iowa	24,452,164
Kansas	25,260,403
Kentucky	37,396,696
Louisiana	35,981,000
Maine	8,097,747
Maryland	79,672,230
Massachusetts	119,074,662
Michigan	77,707,767
Minnesota	99,580,005
Mississippi	11,218,981
Missouri	65,256,852
Montana	6,602,563
Nebraska	23,783,547
Nevada	23,388,683
New Hampshire	12,118,610
New Jersey	131,327,919
New Mexico	9,641,644
New York	289,387,122
North Carolina	86,778,544
North Dakota	6,895,162
Ohio	144,308,916
Oklahoma	26,747,378
Oregon	35,257,459
Pennsylvania	140,452,053
Rhode Island	13,767,341
South Carolina	27,504,298
South Dakota	8,052,555
Tennessee	67,146,127
Texas	275,485,613
Utah	25,137,865
Vermont	4,475,626
Virginia	84,894,551
Washington	101,041,925
West Virginia	6,768,452
Wisconsin	50,340,637
Wyoming	4,859,765
U.S. Armed Service members overseas and Territories other than Puerto Rico	897,066
Puerto Rico	3,593,629
International	11,957,397
TOTAL	3,493,067,956

No data for Guam is available for 2020.

== Fiscal year 2019 ==
This table lists the tax revenue collected from each state, plus the District of Columbia and the territory of Puerto Rico by the IRS in fiscal year 2019, which ran from October 1, 2018, through September 30, 2019. The gross collections total only reflects the revenue collected from the categories listed in the table, and not the entire revenue collected by the IRS.

State federal district or territory	Gross collections (thousands of dollars)
Alabama	26,511,031
Alaska	5,395,473
Arizona	47,743,166
Arkansas	30,572,215
California	472,027,235
Colorado	59,961,429
Connecticut	57,092,781
Delaware	20,073,979
District of Columbia	27,529,823
Florida	210,024,433
Georgia	94,305,868
Hawaii	9,246,293
Idaho	11,343,181
Illinois	162,274,617
Indiana	60,627,045
Iowa	24,914,602
Kansas	26,337,911
Kentucky	35,595,050
Louisiana	39,430,322
Maine	8,130,883
Maryland	78,473,276
Massachusetts	120,035,203
Michigan	81,583,480
Minnesota	102,642,589
Mississippi	11,273,202
Missouri	64,149,074
Montana	6,356,727
Nebraska	25,551,082
Nevada	23,769,524
New Hampshire	12,208,656
New Jersey	140,258,435
New Mexico	9,270,398
New York	304,992,923
North Carolina	87,778,099
North Dakota	6,639,943
Ohio	144,704,811
Oklahoma	29,133,375
Oregon	35,041,125
Pennsylvania	141,973,579
Rhode Island	14,325,645
South Carolina	27,885,047
South Dakota	8,029,363
Tennessee	69,769,299
Texas	292,330,171
Utah	24,335,082
Vermont	4,505,097
Virginia	83,574,427
Washington	100,609,767
West Virginia	7,039,939
Wisconsin	52,872,510
Wyoming	4,743,997
Puerto Rico	3,528,739
U.S. Armed Service members overseas and Territories other than Puerto Rico	770,480
International	12,611,648
TOTAL	3,561,904,049

No data for Guam is available for 2019.

== Fiscal year 2018 ==
This table lists the tax revenue collected from each state, plus the District of Columbia and the territory of Puerto Rico by the IRS in fiscal year 2018, which ran from October 1, 2017, through September 30, 2018. The gross collections total only reflects the revenue collected from the categories listed in the table, and not the entire revenue collected by the IRS.

State federal district or territory	Gross collections ($)
California	456,555,954,000
New York	281,220,376,000
Texas	280,048,364,000
Florida	205,694,126,000
Illinois	161,189,282,000
New Jersey	138,976,784,000
Ohio	140,891,209,000
Pennsylvania	136,268,950,000
Massachusetts	117,998,443,000
Minnesota	99,354,057,000
Georgia	92,804,948,000
Virginia	84,844,999,000
North Carolina	82,539,491,000
Michigan	83,256,186,000
Washington	90,404,108,000
Missouri	63,139,167,000
Maryland	72,561,209,000
Tennessee	68,888,235,000
Connecticut	53,729,155,000
Indiana	58,698,927,000
Wisconsin	51,992,826,000
Colorado	58,707,795,000
Arizona	46,226,885,000
Louisiana	41,982,123,000
Oklahoma	27,908,169,000
Kentucky	34,754,947,000
Arkansas	32,029,540,000
Oregon	33,802,142,000
Kansas	25,813,743,000
District of Columbia	28,443,717,000
Nebraska	25,312,311,000
Alabama	26,724,809,000
South Carolina	28,552,567,000
Iowa	25,111,982,000
Delaware	19,038,671,000
Utah	23,401,402,000
Nevada	23,317,912,000
Rhode Island	14,725,607,000
Mississippi	11,460,401,000
New Hampshire	12,291,272,000
Idaho	10,858,404,000
New Mexico	9,002,297,000
Hawaii	9,591,724,000
South Dakota	8,200,403,000
North Dakota	6,578,855,000
Maine	7,925,462,000
West Virginia	6,911,139,000
Montana	6,229,347,000
Alaska	5,287,377,000
Wyoming	4,930,650,000
Vermont	4,417,527,000
Puerto Rico	3,443,334,000
TOTAL	3,444,039,309,000

No data for Guam is available for 2018.

== Fiscal year 2017 ==
This table lists the tax revenue collected from each state, plus the District of Columbia and the territory of Puerto Rico by the IRS in fiscal year 2018, which ran from October 1, 2016, through September 30, 2017. The gross collections total only reflects the revenue collected from the categories listed in the table, and not the entire revenue collected by the IRS.

State federal district or territory	Gross collections ($)
California	440,475,243,000
Texas	270,955,237,000
New York	268,353,669,000
Florida	192,869,033,000
Illinois	162,326,463,000
New Jersey	143,835,479,000
Ohio	142,086,312,000
Pennsylvania	139,797,047,000
Massachusetts	112,996,320,000
Minnesota	104,429,577,000
Georgia	94,277,375,000
Virginia	87,183,756,000
North Carolina	82,855,993,000
Michigan	82,676,161,000
Washington	85,875,647,000
Missouri	71,921,135,000
Maryland	71,246,920,000
Tennessee	69,069,233,000
Connecticut	57,540,270,000
Indiana	58,940,989,000
Wisconsin	53,089,052,000
Colorado	56,742,235,000
Arizona	43,928,177,000
Louisiana	42,724,672,000
Oklahoma	27,113,120,000
Kentucky	35,126,897,000
Arkansas	32,458,328,000
Oregon	32,345,824,000
Kansas	25,563,140,000
District of Columbia	28,302,953,000
Nebraska	25,450,002,000
Alabama	26,583,916,000
South Carolina	26,636,069,000
Iowa	24,642,287,000
Delaware	17,081,357,000
Utah	22,485,663,000
Nevada	21,570,670,000
Rhode Island	14,917,462,000
Mississippi	11,740,655,000
New Hampshire	12,138,352,000
Idaho	10,386,020,000
New Mexico	8,979,166,000
Hawaii	9,415,214,000
South Dakota	7,872,916,000
North Dakota	6,640,269,000
Maine	8,083,275,000
West Virginia	6,980,482,000
Montana	6,080,381,000
Alaska	5,399,946,000
Wyoming	4,393,700,000
Vermont	4,422,942,000
Puerto Rico	3,393,432,000
TOTAL	3,402,400,432,000

No data for Guam is available for 2017.

== Fiscal year 2015 ==
This table lists the tax revenue collected from each state, plus the District of Columbia and the territory of Puerto Rico by the IRS in fiscal year 2015, which ran from October 1, 2014, through September 30, 2015. The gross collections total only reflects the revenue collected from the categories listed in the table, and not the entire revenue collected by the IRS. Per capita values are based on population estimates from the Census Bureau for July 1, 2015.

Rank	State federal district or territory	Gross collections	Revenue per capita (est.)	Ratio to GSP
1	California	$405,851,295,000	$10,408	16.6%
2	Texas	$279,904,425,000	$10,204	17.1%
3	New York	$269,716,999,000	$13,659	18.5%
4	Florida	$177,389,488,000	$8,762	19.9%
5	Illinois	$158,042,273,000	$12,310	20.5%
6	New Jersey	$153,917,572,000	$17,226	26.6%
7	Ohio	$140,981,150,000	$12,148	23.5%
8	Pennsylvania	$136,108,810,000	$10,640	19.9%
9	Massachusetts	$108,049,205,000	$15,927	22.6%
10	Minnesota	$106,927,808,000	$19,504	31.9%
11	Georgia	$86,446,602,000	$8,476	17.2%
12	Virginia	$80,242,853,000	$9,590	16.7%
13	North Carolina	$78,736,401,000	$7,846	15.4%
14	Michigan	$77,948,414,000	$7,860	16.7%
15	Washington	$73,334,437,000	$10,242	16.3%
16	Missouri	$64,112,504,000	$10,551	22.1%
17	Maryland	$63,936,798,000	$10,665	17.5%
18	Tennessee	$62,708,662,000	$9,508	20.2%
19	Connecticut	$59,174,581,000	$16,507	22.6%
20	Indiana	$57,972,825,000	$8,767	17.5%
21	Wisconsin	$51,748,831,000	$8,972	17.2%
22	Colorado	$47,210,720,000	$8,664	14.8%
23	Arizona	$42,631,316,000	$6,253	14.3%
24	Louisiana	$42,628,150,000	$9,130	16.8%
25	Oklahoma	$33,942,286,000	$8,687	18.9%
26	Kentucky	$32,708,391,000	$7,392	16.8%
27	Arkansas	$32,508,761,000	$10,917	26.3%
28	Oregon	$31,219,148,000	$7,757	13.7%
29	Kansas	$27,019,291,000	$9,295	18.1%
30	District of Columbia	$25,583,750,000	$38,163	20.8%
31	Nebraska	$25,103,770,000	$13,256	22.4%
32	Alabama	$25,070,261,000	$5,165	12.0%
33	South Carolina	$24,086,257,000	$4,921	12.1%
34	Iowa	$23,969,391,000	$7,678	14.0%
35	Delaware	$22,640,853,000	$23,982	34.2%
36	Utah	$20,178,718,000	$6,747	13.6%
37	Nevada	$18,450,072,000	$6,398	13.1%
38	Rhode Island	$14,373,318,000	$13,616	25.5%
39	Mississippi	$11,468,660,000	$3,836	10.7%
40	New Hampshire	$11,314,985,000	$8,507	15.8%
41	Idaho	$9,785,027,000	$5,920	15.0%
42	New Mexico	$8,969,666,000	$4,312	9.9%
43	Hawaii	$8,221,290,000	$5,769	10.3%
44	South Dakota	$7,732,138,000	$9,013	17.0%
45	North Dakota	$7,711,243,000	$10,189	14.4%
46	Maine	$7,464,280,000	$5,615	13.5%
47	West Virginia	$7,374,299,000	$4,005	10.4%
48	Montana	$5,805,098,000	$5,625	12.7%
49	Alaska	$5,717,640,000	$7,751	10.5%
50	Wyoming	$5,284,146,000	$9,009	13.2%
51	Vermont	$4,495,280,000	$7,180	15.1%
	Puerto Rico (Note: Puerto Rico is not a U.S. state but residents pay federal taxes; however, most are not required to pay federal income tax.)	$3,524,557,000	$1,015	N/A
	TOTAL (Note: Ratio to GSP is excluding Puerto Rico.)	$3,283,920,138,000	$10,234	18.3%

GSP is the Gross State Product

== Fiscal year 2012 ==
This table lists the tax revenue collected from each state, plus the District of Columbia and the territory of Puerto Rico by the IRS in fiscal year 2012, which ran from October 1, 2011, through September 30, 2012. The gross collections total only reflects the revenue collected from the categories listed in the table, and not the entire revenue collected by the IRS. Per capita values are based on population estimates from the Census Bureau for July 1, 2012.

Rank	State federal district or territory	Gross collections	Revenue per capita (est.)	Ratio to GSP
1	California	$292,563,574,000	$7,690.66	14.6%
2	Texas	$219,459,878,000	$8,421.59	15.7%
3	New York	$201,167,954,000	$10,279.27	16.7%
4	Illinois	$124,431,227,000	$9,664.37	17.9%
5	Florida	$122,249,635,000	$6,328.42	15.7%
6	New Jersey	$111,377,490,000	$12,564.31	21.9%
7	Ohio	$111,094,276,000	$9,623.36	21.8%
8	Pennsylvania	$108,961,515,000	$8,536.94	18.1%
9	Massachusetts	$79,826,976,000	$12,011.02	19.8%
10	Minnesota	$78,685,402,000	$14,627.88	26.7%
11	Georgia	$65,498,308,000	$6,602.69	15.1%
12	Virginia	$64,297,400,000	$7,854.68	14.4%
13	North Carolina	$61,600,064,000	$6,316.61	13.5%
14	Michigan	$59,210,158,000	$5,990.89	14.8%
15	Washington	$52,443,862,000	$7,603.85	14.0%
16	Indiana	$51,238,512,000	$7,837.83	17.2%
17	Missouri	$48,413,247,000	$8,039.41	18.7%
18	Maryland	$48,107,002,000	$8,175.12	15.1%
19	Connecticut	$47,262,702,000	$13,163.83	20.6%
20	Tennessee	$47,010,303,000	$7,281.37	17.0%
21	Wisconsin	$41,498,033,000	$7,246.80	15.9%
22	Colorado	$41,252,701,000	$7,952.20	15.1%
23	Arizona	$34,850,436,000	$5,318.03	13.1%
24	Louisiana	$34,811,072,000	$7,564.51	14.3%
25	Oklahoma	$27,087,264,000	$7,100.54	16.8%
26	Arkansas	$25,299,832,000	$8,578.74	23.1%
27	Kentucky	$25,085,813,000	$5,726.81	14.5%
28	Oregon	$22,716,602,000	$5,825.74	11.4%
29	Kansas	$21,904,615,000	$7,590.21	15.8%
30	Delaware	$21,835,412,000	$23,809.40	33.1%
31	Alabama	$20,882,949,000	$4,330.74	11.4%
	District of Columbia (Note: The District of Columbia is not a U.S. state, but its residents pay federal taxes.)	$20,747,652,000	$32,811.79	18.9%
32	Nebraska	$19,795,254,000	$10,668.28	19.9%
33	Iowa	$18,753,596,000	$6,100.35	12.3%
34	South Carolina	$18,557,166,000	$3,928.50	10.5%
35	Utah	$15,642,129,000	$5,478.30	12.0%
36	Nevada	$13,727,425,000	$4,975.63	10.3%
37	Rhode Island	$10,992,338,000	$10,465.98	21.6%
38	Mississippi	$10,458,549,000	$3,503.79	10.3%
39	New Hampshire	$8,807,691,000	$6,668.87	13.6%
40	New Mexico	$7,866,206,000	$3,771.79	9.8%
41	Idaho	$7,622,490,000	$4,776.81	13.1%
42	Hawaii	$6,511,578,000	$4,676.81	9.0%
43	West Virginia	$6,498,502,000	$3,502.46	9.4%
44	Maine	$6,229,189,000	$4,686.45	11.6%
45	North Dakota	$5,664,860,000	$8,096.96	12.3%
46	South Dakota	$5,136,249,000	$6,163.35	12.1%
47	Alaska	$4,898,780,000	$6,697.36	9.4%
48	Montana	$4,383,727,000	$4,361.31	10.8%
49	Wyoming	$3,828,379,000	$6,641.74	10.0%
50	Vermont	$3,524,887,000	$5,630.71	12.9%
	Puerto Rico	$3,067,234,000	$836.42	N/A
	TOTAL	$2,514,838,095,000	7,918.73 (US Avg.)	16.1%

GSP is the Gross State Product

== Fiscal year 2011 ==
This table lists the tax revenue collected from each state, plus the District of Columbia and the territory of Puerto Rico by the IRS in fiscal year 2011, which ran from October 1, 2010, through September 30, 2011. The gross collections total only reflects the revenue collected from the categories listed in the table, and not the entire revenue collected by the IRS. Per capita values are based on population estimates from the Census Bureau for July 1, 2011.

Rank	State federal district or territory	Gross collections	Revenue per capita (est.)	Ratio to GSP
1	California	$281,227,298,000	$7,462.79	14.4%
2	New York	$202,149,306,000	$10,365.77	17.5%
3	Texas	$198,295,817,000	$7,736.33	15.2%
4	Illinois	$119,116,442,000	$9,262.73	17.8%
5	Florida	$116,758,697,000	$6,118.70	15.5%
6	New Jersey	$112,103,329,000	$12,688.87	23.0%
7	Ohio	$112,069,407,000	$9,710.54	23.2%
8	Pennsylvania	$103,134,437,000	$8,092.82	17.8%
9	Massachusetts	$77,218,196,000	$11,687.33	19.7%
10	Minnesota	$72,676,800,000	$13,591.31	25.8%
11	Georgia	$60,601,096,000	$6,175.93	14.5%
12	Virginia	$60,074,032,000	$7,412.54	14.0%
13	North Carolina	$56,809,844,000	$5,886.36	12.9%
14	Michigan	$55,625,833,000	$5,631.97	14.4%
15	Washington	$52,531,569,000	$7,698.89	14.8%
16	Maryland	$49,083,255,000	$8,405.28	16.3%
17	Missouri	$46,794,981,000	$7,787.50	18.8%
18	Connecticut	$45,561,956,000	$12,702.97	19.8%
19	Tennessee	$45,189,610,000	$7,061.11	17.0%
20	Indiana	$43,886,554,000	$6,734.83	15.8%
21	Colorado	$40,328,519,000	$7,882.36	15.3%
22	Wisconsin	$38,866,764,000	$6,806.98	15.3%
23	Louisiana	$35,888,004,000	$7,844.77	14.5%
24	Arizona	$32,920,415,000	$5,090.28	12.7%
25	Arkansas	$26,326,077,000	$8,958.77	24.9%
26	Kentucky	$24,451,664,000	$5,599.43	14.8%
27	Oklahoma	$24,400,086,000	$6,447.95	15.7%
28	Oregon	$22,366,343,000	$5,782.06	11.5%
29	Delaware	$21,088,276,000	$23,221.47	32.1%
30	Alabama	$20,394,671,000	$4,245.63	11.8%
31	Kansas	$19,758,229,000	$6,883.47	15.1%
	District of Columbia	$19,619,128,000	$31,693.85	18.2%
32	Iowa	$17,805,295,000	$5,810.94	12.0%
33	South Carolina	$17,465,006,000	$3,737.15	10.5%
34	Nebraska	$15,664,192,000	$8,502.82	16.6%
35	Utah	$14,700,936,000	$5,223.57	11.8%
36	Nevada	$13,032,725,000	$4,791.39	10.0%
37	Rhode Island	$10,428,091,000	$9,925.41	20.8%
38	Mississippi	$9,183,541,000	$3,084.36	9.4%
39	New Hampshire	$8,702,370,000	$6,603.68	13.7%
40	New Mexico	$8,039,313,000	$3,867.52	10.1%
41	West Virginia	$6,386,378,000	$3,442.96	9.6%
42	Idaho	$6,345,865,000	$4,006.88	11.0%
43	Maine	$6,153,147,000	$4,631.50	11.9%
44	Hawaii	$6,127,725,000	$4,446.41	9.1%
45	North Dakota	$4,917,384,000	$7,181.39	12.2%
46	Alaska	$4,860,572,000	$6,714.80	9.5%
47	South Dakota	$4,624,947,000	$5,615.57	11.5%
48	Montana	$4,197,002,000	$4,206.82	11.0%
49	Wyoming	$3,516,453,000	$6,197.97	9.3%
50	Vermont	$3,333,342,000	$5,319.80	12.9%
	Puerto Rico	$3,313,199,000	$896.89	N/A
	TOTAL	$2,406,114,118,000	7,631.63 (Avg.)	16.0%

== Maps and graphs ==
Map of total federal tax revenue by state in 2007. Legend: <$25 billion $25-$50 billion $50-$75 billion / $75-$100 billion $100-$125 billion $125-$150 billion / $150-$175 billion $175-$200 billion >$200 billion

Map of average federal tax revenue per capita by state in 2007. Legend: <$4,000 $4,000-$6,000 $6,000-$8,000 / $8,000-$10,000 $10,000-$12,000 $12,000-$14,000 / $14,000-$16,000 $16,000-$18,000 >$18,000

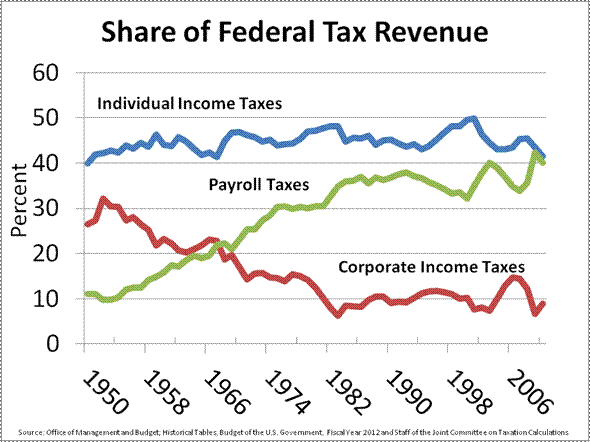
Share of federal revenue from different tax sources. Individual income taxes (blue), payroll taxes/FICA (green), corporate income taxes (red).

== See also ==
- Federal taxation and spending by state

Federal taxes:

- Income tax in the United States

State taxes:

- State tax levels in the United States
- State income tax
- Sales taxes in the United States

General:

- Taxation in the United States

== Citations ==
New table is available for 2015 to update the data. Also - would be good to be able to see some trends in the data in terms of growth by state in terms of taxes paid
