= Megan Romer =

American socialist activist (born 1983)

- Romer in 2026

National Co-Chair of the Democratic Socialists of America
- Incumbent
- Assumed office August 2023 Serving with Ashik Siddique
- Preceded by: Office established

Personal details
- Born: 1983 (age 42–43) Central New York, US

Megan Romer (born 1983) is an American democratic socialist political activist. Romer is a member of the Democratic Socialists of America (DSA), where she was elected as National Co-Chair from 2023 to 2027 and National Political Committee member from 2021 to 2023.

== Early life ==
Romer grew up in rural upstate New York in a trailer park, the daughter of a paramedic and a nursing aide. She moved to Lafayette, Louisiana, where she worked as a travel writer. She was initially active with a group of female Democrats, but claims she was asked to leave because she was considered "too disruptive". She joined the DSA, eventually moving back to New York. She is an ordained ruling elder in the Presbyterian Church (USA).

== Political career ==
Romer began being politically active in Louisiana, doing mutual aid work to raise money after local floodings and church arsons. She was the co-chair of the Southwest Louisiana chapter of DSA and the DSA National Mutual Aid Working Group. She is a member of the Red Star caucus, a Marxist-Leninist caucus of the DSA.

== Positions ==
In July 2026, Romer was interviewed by Fox News, where she explained the DSA's platform including, among other things, abolishing Immigration and Customs Enforcement, and giving amnesty to anyone who was in the United States illegally. Video of the interview went viral on X, giving it millions of views.

In August 2026, she was interviewed by David Remnick for The New Yorker Radio Hour, where she described democratic socialism as "people having a democratic say-so in all of the things that they need to survive; so democratic control of their workplace, democratic control of their housing, and democracy in what we already know as democracy in the political process." At that interview, when asked about Darializa Avila Chevalier's attendance of a "pro-Hamas" rally in Times Square on October 8, 2023, Romer expressed her support for Avila Chevalier and said that she likely would have attended the rally herself, claiming Gazans live in an "open-air concentration camp" and calling the October 7 attacks "inevitable."

== See also ==
- Green New Deal
