= State tax levels in the United States =

Top Marginal State Income Tax Rate

State tax levels indicate both the tax burden and the services a state can afford to provide residents.

States use a different combination of sales, income, excise taxes, and user fees. Some are levied directly from residents, and others are levied indirectly. This table includes the per capita tax collected at the state level.

This table does not necessarily reflect the actual tax burdens borne directly by individual persons or businesses in a state. For example, the direct state tax burden on individuals in Alaska is far lower than the table would indicate. The state has no direct personal income tax and does not collect a state-level sales tax, although it allows local governments to collect their own sales taxes. Alaska collects most of its revenue from corporate taxes on the oil and gas industry.

This table does not take into consideration the taxing and spending of local governments within states, which can vary widely, and sometimes disproportionately with state tax burdens.

== State government tax collections (2024) ==
This data is collected by the United States Census Bureau for state governments during fiscal year 2015. These statistics include tax collections for state governments only; they do not include tax collections from local governments. % represents the proportion of total taxes from that category and not the tax rate.

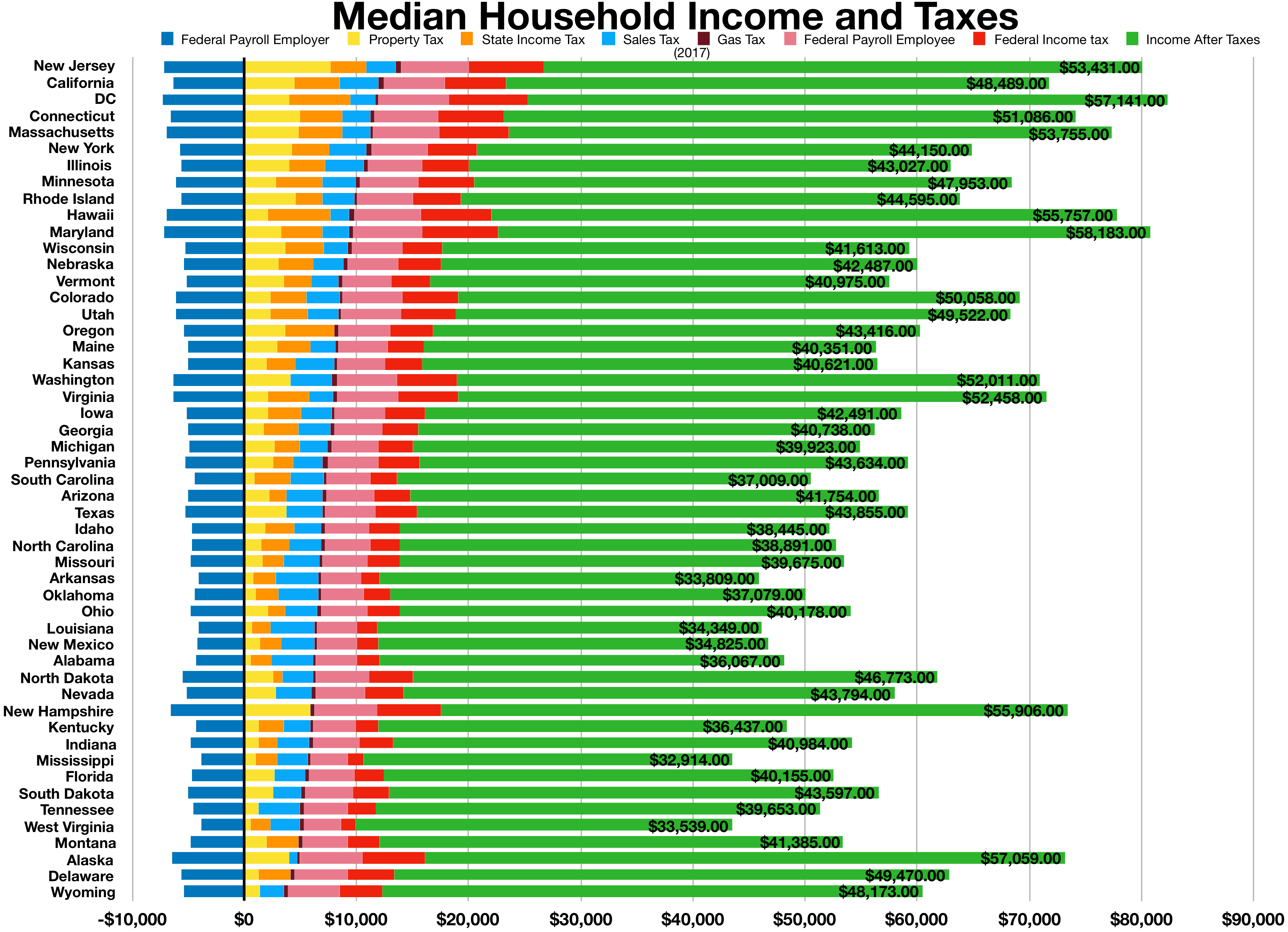
Median household income and taxes

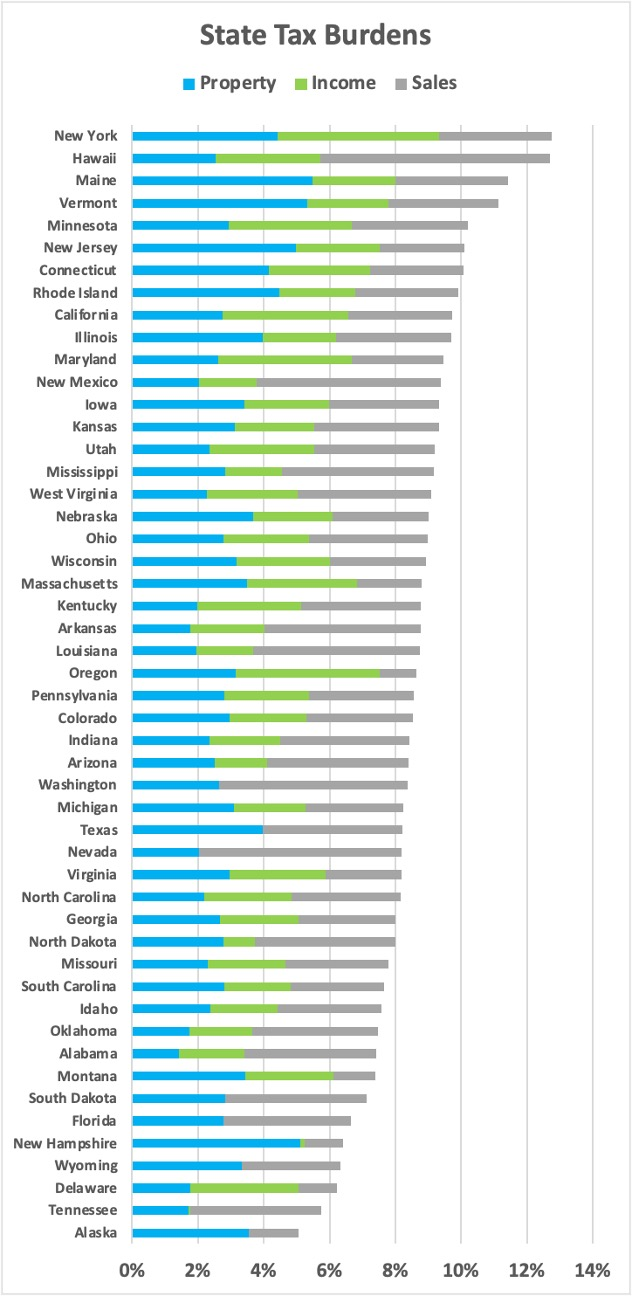
State Tax Burdens 2022
% of income

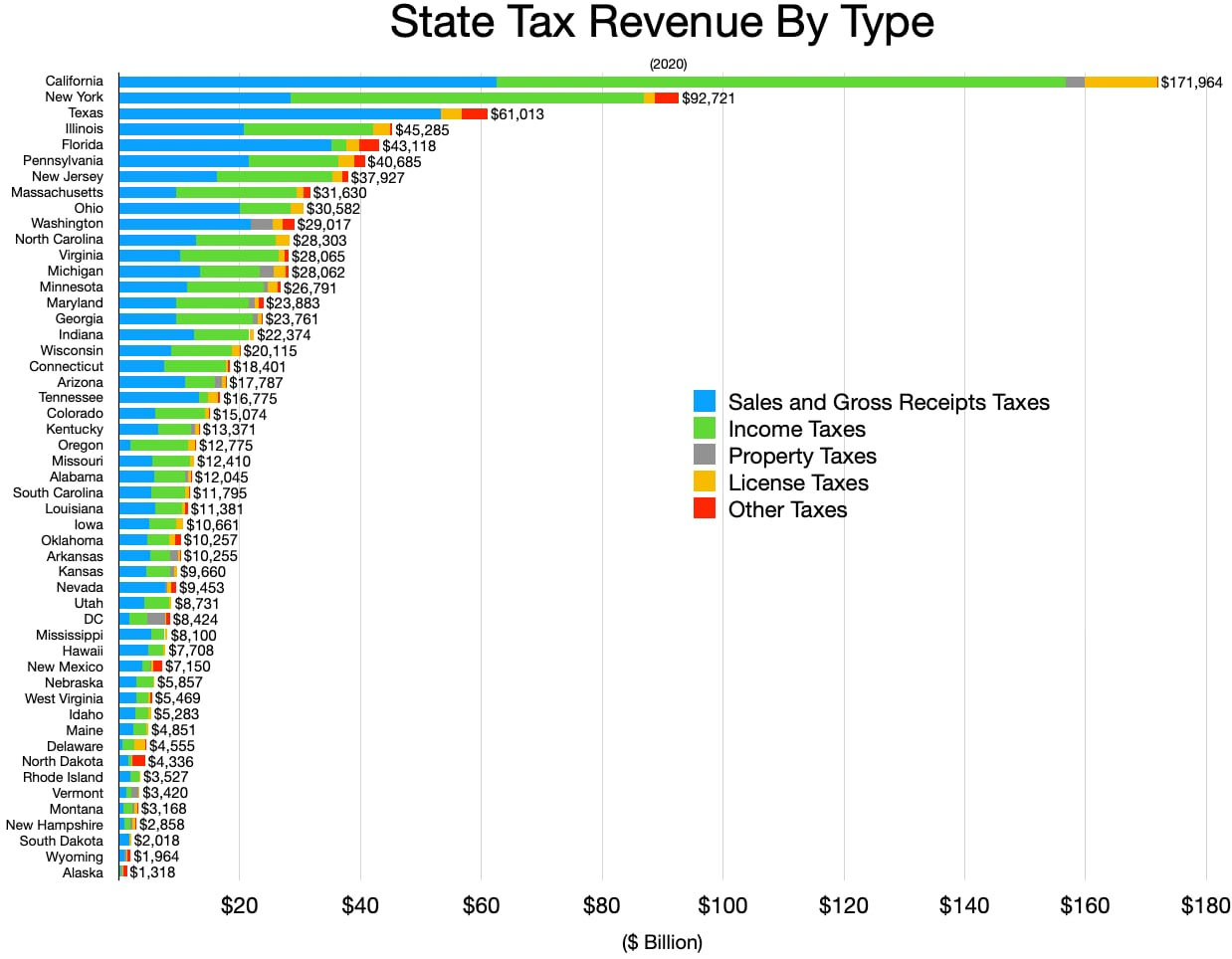

	Property taxes^{[A]} ($ thousands)		Sales taxes^{[B]} ($ thousands)		License taxes ($ thousands)		Income taxes^{[C]} ($ thousands)		Other taxes^{[D]} ($ thousands)		Total taxes ($ thousands)	Population^{[E]}	Per capita ($)
State		%		%		%		%		%			
Alabama	620,698	3.67%	8,106,236	47.98%	612,540	3.63%	7,463,209	44.17%	92,998	0.55%	16,895,681	5,024,279	3362.81
Alaska	130,855	6.59%	322,606	16.25%	106,186	5.35%	389,125	19.59%	1,037,074	52.22%	1,985,846	733,391	2707.76
Arizona	762,865	3.23%	15,342,937	65.02%	633,065	2.68%	6,593,551	27.94%	263,198	1.12%	23,595,616	7,151,502	3299.39
Arkansas	1,515,978	11.96%	6,815,000	53.77%	432,904	3.42%	3,732,270	29.45%	178,138	1.41%	12,674,290	3,011,524	4208.60
California	3,558,041	1.34%	74,065,328	27.89%	15,013,849	5.65%	164,509,965	61.95%	8,403,496	3.16%	265,550,679	39,538,223	6716.30
Colorado	0	0.00%	8,136,841	44.05%	754,470	4.08%	9,394,659	50.86%	187,105	1.01%	18,473,075	5,773,714	3199.51
Connecticut	0	0.00%	9,177,916	39.54%	404,268	1.74%	13,237,041	57.02%	393,853	1.70%	23,213,078	3,605,944	6437.45
Delaware	0	0.00%	658,914	10.08%	2,584,139	39.55%	3,070,864	47.00%	220,445	3.37%	6,534,362	989,948	6600.71
D.C.	3,000,107	28.81%	2,458,439	23.61%	240,053	2.30%	4,271,954	41.02%	444,239	4.27%	10,414,792	689,545	15103.86
Florida	0	0.00%	50,501,721	80.05%	2,450,462	3.88%	6,045,890	9.58%	4,089,814	6.48%	63,087,887	21,538,187	2929.12
Georgia	862,884	2.56%	12,321,555	36.62%	620,795	1.85%	19,635,627	58.36%	203,426	0.60%	33,644,287	10,711,908	3140.83
Hawaii	0	0.00%	6,294,856	59.53%	330,902	3.13%	3,795,096	35.89%	153,205	1.45%	10,574,059	1,455,271	7266.04
Idaho	0	0.00%	3,758,409	45.11%	505,798	6.07%	4,056,255	48.69%	10,587	0.13%	8,331,049	1,839,106	4529.94
Illinois	73,342	0.11%	27,667,838	41.34%	3,917,306	5.85%	34,525,707	51.59%	736,051	1.10%	66,920,244	12,812,508	5223.04
Indiana	15,285	0.06%	16,156,604	61.85%	889,114	3.40%	9,061,329	34.69%	1,235	0.00%	26,123,567	6,785,528	3849.89
Iowa	837	0.01%	6,241,217	48.98%	1,118,379	8.78%	5,293,280	41.54%	88,287	0.69%	12,742,000	3,190,369	3993.90
Kansas	952,523	7.29%	5,657,731	43.30%	452,958	3.47%	5,969,395	45.68%	35,044	0.27%	13,067,651	2,937,880	4447.99
Kentucky	808,162	4.69%	8,585,807	49.86%	570,494	3.31%	7,056,636	40.98%	199,787	1.16%	17,220,886	4,505,836	3821.91
Louisiana	131,236	0.82%	8,127,417	50.94%	970,899	6.09%	5,896,980	36.96%	828,612	5.19%	15,955,144	4,657,757	3425.50
Maine	39,993	0.61%	3,196,236	49.10%	336,434	5.17%	2,858,702	43.92%	77,708	1.19%	6,509,073	1,362,359	4777.80
Maryland	994,776	3.22%	12,673,025	41.00%	1,052,694	3.41%	15,496,879	50.13%	694,329	2.25%	30,911,703	6,177,224	5004.14
Massachusetts	15,416	0.04%	12,302,201	28.56%	1,417,438	3.29%	28,425,442	65.98%	920,475	2.14%	43,080,972	7,029,917	6128.23
Michigan	2,592,924	6.90%	18,082,322	48.13%	2,294,219	6.11%	14,177,504	37.73%	425,377	1.13%	37,572,346	10,077,331	3728.40
Minnesota	731,865	2.05%	13,575,926	38.06%	1,622,308	4.55%	19,149,541	53.69%	587,339	1.65%	35,666,979	5,706,494	6250.24
Mississippi	30,361	0.29%	6,845,576	64.57%	631,900	5.96%	3,045,600	28.73%	49,152	0.46%	10,602,589	2,961,279	3580.41
Missouri	46,136	0.26%	7,583,232	42.63%	739,384	4.16%	9,400,085	52.84%	20,859	0.12%	17,789,696	6,154,913	2890.32
Montana	481,087	10.18%	902,777	19.11%	527,073	11.16%	2,556,940	54.13%	255,831	5.42%	4,723,708	1,084,225	4356.76
Nebraska	126	0.00%	3,663,203	45.20%	207,997	2.57%	4,207,280	51.91%	26,233	0.32%	8,104,839	1,961,504	4131.95
Nevada	1,816,136	12.08%	11,417,466	75.95%	783,518	5.21%	0	0.00%	1,016,194	6.76%	15,033,314	3,104,614	4842.25
New Hampshire	410,549	11.45%	1,020,509	28.46%	569,533	15.88%	1,401,979	39.09%	183,729	5.12%	3,586,299	1,377,529	2603.43
New Jersey	4,964	0.01%	20,870,072	40.26%	2,333,801	4.50%	27,446,398	52.95%	1,183,124	2.28%	51,838,359	9,288,994	5580.62
New Mexico	125,960	0.92%	5,344,361	39.03%	396,305	2.89%	3,184,225	23.25%	4,643,196	33.91%	13,694,047	2,117,522	6467.02
New York	0	0.00%	34,950,518	29.19%	1,934,656	1.62%	77,058,114	64.36%	5,783,749	4.83%	119,727,037	20,201,249	5926.71
North Carolina	0	0.00%	18,174,648	46.45%	2,613,154	6.68%	18,223,476	46.58%	113,468	0.29%	39,124,746	10,439,388	3747.80
North Dakota	5,818	0.10%	1,881,912	32.18%	251,794	4.31%	612,922	10.48%	3,095,262	52.93%	5,847,708	779,094	7505.78
Ohio	0	0.00%	25,290,341	67.50%	2,094,524	5.59%	10,020,919	26.75%	60,583	0.16%	37,466,367	11,799,448	3175.26
Oklahoma	0	0.00%	5,630,902	43.22%	974,827	7.48%	5,202,631	39.94%	1,218,966	9.36%	13,027,326	3,959,353	3290.27
Oregon	20,734	0.12%	4,219,270	24.48%	1,268,999	7.36%	11,223,340	65.12%	501,625	2.91%	17,233,968	4,237,256	4067.25
Pennsylvania	44,073	0.08%	27,610,030	50.02%	3,163,308	5.73%	22,035,563	39.92%	2,345,053	4.25%	55,198,027	13,002,700	4245.12
Rhode Island	5,364	0.10%	2,841,178	53.84%	165,232	3.13%	2,197,596	41.64%	68,078	1.29%	5,277,448	1,097,379	4809.14
South Carolina	92,821	0.51%	9,497,669	52.69%	750,485	4.16%	7,496,591	41.59%	188,929	1.05%	18,026,495	5,118,425	3521.88
South Dakota	0	0.00%	2,258,095	84.31%	347,624	12.98%	60,718	2.27%	11,995	0.45%	2,678,432	886,667	3020.79
Tennessee	0	0.00%	18,157,169	75.15%	2,559,422	10.59%	3,050,692	12.63%	392,513	1.62%	24,159,796	6,910,840	3495.93
Texas	0	0.00%	74,929,968	85.79%	3,810,705	4.36%	0	0.00%	8,596,027	9.84%	87,336,700	29,145,505	2996.58
Utah	0	0.00%	5,719,110	42.56%	450,048	3.35%	7,169,556	53.35%	99,118	0.74%	13,437,832	3,271,616	4107.40
Vermont	1,307,255	28.17%	1,544,093	33.27%	156,828	3.38%	1,498,470	32.29%	134,103	2.89%	4,640,749	643,077	7216.47
Virginia	45,114	0.12%	14,316,563	38.01%	1,205,070	3.20%	21,473,737	57.02%	620,660	1.65%	37,661,144	8,631,393	4363.28
Washington	4,614,073	12.36%	28,367,381	75.97%	2,140,815	5.73%	350,447	0.94%	1,869,339	5.01%	37,342,055	7,705,281	4846.29
West Virginia	9,350	0.13%	3,546,594	50.79%	236,248	3.38%	2,735,322	39.17%	455,604	6.52%	6,983,118	1,793,716	3893.10
Wisconsin	104,756	0.41%	10,641,433	41.74%	1,396,395	5.48%	13,244,561	51.95%	108,931	0.43%	25,496,076	5,893,718	4325.97
Wyoming	401,751	15.22%	1,223,689	46.36%	212,846	8.06%	0	0.00%	801,442	30.36%	2,639,728	576,851	4576.10
United States	26,374,215	1.78%	678,674,841	45.87%	71,254,165	4.82%	649,004,063	43.87%	54,115,585	3.66%	1,479,422,869	331,449,281	4463.50

=== Notes ===
1. Only includes taxes collected at the state level
2. Includes alcohol, fuel, and tobacco taxes
3. Includes both personal and business income
4. Includes inheritance, gift, and severance taxes
5. As of April 1, 2020

== State government tax collections (2012) ==
This data is collected by the United States Census Bureau for state governments during fiscal year 2012. These statistics include tax collections for state governments only; they do not include tax collections from local governments. % represents the proportion of total taxes from that category and not the tax rate.

	Sales taxes^{[A]} ($ thousands)		Income taxes^{[B]} ($ thousands)		Property taxes^{[C]} ($ thousands)		License taxes ($ thousands)		Other taxes^{[D]} ($ thousands)		Total taxes ($ thousands)	Population^{[E]}	Per capita ($)
State		%		%		%		%		%			
Alabama	4,626,357	51%	3,430,690	38%	321,530	4%	517,676	6%	153,041	2%	9,049,294	4,822,023	1,876.66
Alaska	248,432	4%	663,144	9%	215,407	3%	135,055	2%	5,787,360	82%	7,049,398	731,449	9,637.58
Arizona	8,066,124	62%	3,741,713	29%	754,428	6%	370,222	3%	40,778	0%	12,973,265	6,553,255	1,979.67
Arkansas	3,982,832	48%	2,805,985	34%	1,008,707	12%	355,768	4%	131,208	2%	8,284,500	2,949,131	2,809.13
California	41,341,188	36%	62,973,435	55%	2,079,878	2%	8,658,041	8%	37,112	0%	115,089,654	38,041,430	3,025.38
Colorado	4,090,645	40%	5,367,851	52%	X	X	616,752	6%	175,380	2%	10,250,628	5,187,582	1,975.99
Connecticut	6,678,117	43%	7,996,509	52%	X	X	416,396	3%	309,996	2%	15,401,018	3,590,347	4,289.56
Delaware	491,044	15%	1,455,159	43%	X	X	1,230,384	37%	170,365	5%	3,346,952	917,092	3,649.53
Florida	27,267,196	83%	2,003,490	6%	140	0%	2,205,376	7%	1,520,810	5%	32,997,012	19,317,568	1,708.13
Georgia	7,253,554	44%	8,733,047	53%	68,951	0%	505,618	3%	15,733	0%	16,576,903	9,919,945	1,671.07
Hawaii	3,581,652	65%	1,621,002	29%	X	X	258,795	5%	54,697	1%	5,516,146	1,392,313	3,961.86
Idaho	1,664,615	49%	1,401,924	42%	X	X	299,443	9%	8,322	0%	3,374,304	1,595,728	2,114.59
Illinois	14,295,688	39%	19,006,849	52%	65,106	0%	2,602,296	7%	287,823	1%	36,257,762	12,875,255	2,816.08
Indiana	9,172,715	58%	5,724,366	36%	0	0%	629,260	4%	178,166	1%	15,704,507	6,537,334	2,402.28
Iowa	3,532,811	45%	3,455,485	44%	X	X	751,627	10%	92,465	1%	7,832,388	3,074,186	2,547.79
Kansas	3,685,595	50%	3,209,321	43%	74,413	1%	315,411	4%	133,601	2%	7,418,341	2,885,905	2,570.54
Kentucky	5,034,577	48%	4,087,239	39%	529,567	5%	463,793	4%	390,618	4%	10,505,794	4,380,415	2,398.36
Louisiana	4,888,854	54%	2,764,995	31%	50,937	1%	402,212	4%	887,055	10%	8,994,053	4,601,893	1,954.42
Maine	1,748,815	46%	1,674,044	44%	38,360	1%	252,404	7%	63,507	2%	3,777,130	1,329,192	2,841.67
Maryland	7,173,515	42%	7,996,961	47%	755,937	4%	730,878	4%	381,203	2%	17,038,494	5,884,563	2,895.46
Massachusetts	7,319,030	32%	13,935,232	61%	4,441	0%	899,682	4%	647,259	3%	22,805,644	6,646,144	3,431.41
Michigan	12,654,547	53%	7,725,070	32%	1,911,188	8%	1,414,986	6%	213,950	1%	23,919,741	9,883,360	2,420.20
Minnesota	9,139,154	44%	9,054,106	44%	807,700	4%	1,186,734	6%	372,846	2%	20,560,540	5,379,139	3,822.27
Mississippi	4,396,669	63%	1,896,945	27%	23,982	0%	517,982	7%	117,784	2%	6,953,362	2,984,926	2,329.49
Missouri	4,764,940	44%	5,433,367	50%	29,409	0%	563,570	5%	10,766	0%	10,802,052	6,021,988	1,793.77
Montana	544,733	22%	1,032,541	42%	257,189	10%	315,571	13%	309,290	13%	2,459,324	1,005,141	2,446.75
Nebraska	2,059,913	48%	2,072,640	48%	78	0%	183,035	4%	17,091	0%	4,332,757	1,855,525	2,335.06
Nevada	5,231,962	77%	0	0%	234,522	3%	583,829	9%	724,799	11%	6,775,112	2,758,931	2,455.70
New Hampshire	875,037	40%	602,866	27%	380,682	17%	265,555	12%	84,061	4%	2,208,201	1,320,718	1,671.97
New Jersey	12,009,552	44%	13,057,551	48%	5,650	0%	1,425,441	5%	957,981	3%	27,456,175	8,864,590	3,097.29
New Mexico	2,653,449	52%	1,431,515	28%	60,183	1%	180,259	4%	767,736	15%	5,093,142	2,085,538	2,442.12
New York	22,869,327	32%	43,339,857	61%	X	X	1,926,804	3%	3,409,757	5%	71,545,745	19,570,261	3,655.84
North Carolina	9,539,299	42%	11,603,868	51%	X	X	1,475,960	6%	94,230	0%	22,713,357	9,752,073	2,329.08
North Dakota	1,594,529	28%	648,149	12%	2,398	0%	187,847	3%	3,187,113	57%	5,620,036	699,628	8,032.89
Ohio	13,119,734	51%	9,147,103	35%	X	X	3,580,483	14%	76,704	0%	25,924,024	11,544,225	2,245.63
Oklahoma	3,724,416	42%	3,220,385	36%	X	X	1,032,981	12%	861,517	10%	8,839,299	3,814,820	2,317.09
Oregon	1,398,998	16%	6,258,923	72%	15,710	0%	903,132	10%	122,863	1%	8,699,626	3,899,353	2,231.04
Pennsylvania	17,151,633	52%	11,939,487	36%	38,452	0%	2,646,493	8%	1,173,852	4%	32,949,917	12,763,536	2,581.57
Rhode Island	1,477,992	52%	1,203,959	43%	2,095	0%	107,595	4%	35,862	1%	2,827,503	1,050,292	2,692.11
South Carolina	4,198,261	52%	3,349,738	42%	8,811	0%	449,727	6%	29,945	0%	8,036,482	4,723,723	1,701.30
South Dakota	1,197,116	79%	59,837	4%	X	X	250,572	16%	13,952	1%	1,521,477	833,354	1,825.73
Tennessee	8,962,195	75%	1,408,141	12%	X	X	1,282,015	11%	329,994	3%	11,982,345	6,456,243	1,855.93
Texas	37,431,966	77%	0	0%	X	X	7,509,000	15%	3,655,582	8%	48,596,548	26,059,203	1,864.85
Utah	2,722,128	47%	2,725,073	47%	X	X	255,677	4%	107,075	2%	5,809,953	2,855,287	2,034.81
Vermont	968,303	35%	695,029	25%	948,749	34%	101,161	4%	44,128	2%	2,757,370	626,011	4,404.67
Virginia	5,853,266	32%	11,054,938	61%	34,297	0%	777,187	4%	417,898	2%	18,137,586	8,185,867	2,215.72
Washington	14,171,443	80%	0	0%	1,897,095	11%	994,819	6%	561,358	3%	17,624,715	6,897,012	2,555.41
West Virginia	2,559,586	48%	1,948,131	37%	6,039	0%	137,670	3%	634,347	12%	5,285,773	1,855,413	2,848.84
Wisconsin	7,008,022	44%	7,696,502	48%	155,571	1%	1,077,742	7%	57,498	0%	15,995,335	5,726,398	2,793.26
Wyoming	1,120,203	44%	0	0%	316,734	12%	140,045	5%	974,009	38%	2,550,991	576,412	4,425.64
Total	377,541,729	47%	322,654,162	40%	13,104,336	2%	54,090,961	7%	30,830,487	4%	798,221,675	313,914,040	2,542.80

=== Notes ===
1. Includes alcohol, fuel, and tobacco taxes
2. Includes both personal and business income
3. Only includes taxes collected at the state level
4. Includes inheritance, gift, and severance taxes
5. As of July 1, 2012

== State individual income tax rates and brackets ==
State individual income tax rates & brackets (2016)
State	Single filer rates > Brackets	Married filing jointly rates > Brackets
Ala.	2.00% > $0	2.00% > $0
	4.00% > $500	4.00% > $1,000
	5.00% > $3,000	5.00% > $6,000
Alaska	none	none
Ariz.	2.59% > $0	2.59% > $0
	2.88% > $10,000	2.88% > $20,000
	3.36% > $25,000	3.36% > $50,000
	4.24% > $50,000	4.24% > $100,000
	4.54% > $150,000	4.54% > $300,000
Ark.	0.90% > $0	0.90% > $0
	2.50% > $4,299	2.50% > $4,299
	3.50% > $8,399	3.50% > $8,399
	4.50% > $12,599	4.50% > $12,599
	6.00% > $20,999	6.00% > $20,999
	6.90% > $35,099	6.90% > $35,099
Calif.	1.00% > $0	1.00% > $0
	2.00% > $7,850	2.00% > $15,700
	4.00% > $18,610	4.00% > $37,220
	6.00% > $29,372	6.00% > $58,744
	8.00% > $40,773	8.00% > $81,546
	9.30% > $51,530	9.30% > $103,060
	10.30% > $263,222	10.30% > $526,444
	11.30% > $315,866	11.30% > $631,732
	12.30% > $526,443	12.30% > $1,000,000
	13.30% > $1,000,000	13.30% > $1,052,886
Colo.	4.63% of federal	4.63% of federal
Conn.	3.00% > $0	3.00% > $0
	5.00% > $10,000	5.00% > $20,000
	5.50% > $50,000	5.50% > $100,000
	6.00% > $100,000	6.00% > $200,000
	6.50% > $200,000	6.50% > $400,000
	6.90% > $250,000	6.90% > $500,000
	6.99% > $500,000	6.99% > $1,000,000
Del.	2.20% > $2,000	2.20% > $2,000
	3.90% > $5,000	3.90% > $5,000
	4.80% > $10,000	4.80% > $10,000
	5.20% > $20,000	5.20% > $20,000
	5.55% > $25,000	5.55% > $25,000
	6.60% > $60,000	6.60% > $60,000
Fla.	none	none
Ga.	1.00% > $0	1.00% > $0
	2.00% > $750	2.00% > $1,000
	3.00% > $2,250	3.00% > $3,000
	4.00% > $3,750	4.00% > $5,000
	5.00% > $5,250	5.00% > $7,000
	6.00% > $7,000	6.00% > $10,000
Hawaii	1.40% > $0	1.40% > $0
	3.20% > $2,400	3.20% > $4,800
	5.50% > $4,800	5.50% > $9,600
	6.40% > $9,600	6.40% > $19,200
	6.80% > $14,400	6.80% > $28,800
	7.20% > $19,200	7.20% > $38,400
	7.60% > $24,000	7.60% > $48,000
	7.90% > $36,000	7.90% > $72,000
	8.25% > $48,000	8.25% > $96,000
Idaho	1.60% > $0	1.60% > $0
	3.60% > $1,452	3.60% > $2,904
	4.10% > $2,940	4.10% > $5,808
	5.10% > $4,356	5.10% > $8,712
	6.10% > $5,808	6.10% > $11,616
	7.10% > $7,260	7.10% > $14,520
	7.40% > $10,890	7.40% > $21,780
Ill.	3.75% of federal	3.75% of federal
Ind.	3.3% of federal	3.3% of federal
Iowa	0.36% > $0	0.36% > $0
	0.72% > $1,554	0.72% > $1,554
	2.43% > $3,108	2.43% > $3,108
	4.50% > $6,216	4.50% > $6,216
	6.12% > $13,896	6.12% > $13,896
	6.48% > $23,310	6.48% > $23,310
	6.80% > $31,080	6.80% > $31,080
	7.92% > $46,620	7.92% > $46,620
	8.98% > $69,930	8.98% > $69,930
Kans.	2.70% > $0	2.70% > $0
	4.60% > $15,000	4.60% > $30,000
Ky.	2.00% > $0	2.00% > $0
	3.00% > $3,000	3.00% > $3,000
	4.00% > $4,000	4.00% > $4,000
	5.00% > $5,000	5.00% > $5,000
	5.80% > $8,000	5.80% > $8,000
	6.00% > $75,000	6.00% > $75,000
La.	2.00% > $0	2.00% > $0
	4.00% > $12,500	4.00% > $25,000
	6.00% > $50,000	6.00% > $100,000
Maine	5.80% > $0	5.80% > $0
	6.75% > $21,049	6.75% > $42,099
	7.15% > $37,499	7.15% > $74,999
Md.	2.00% > $0	2.00% > $0
	3.00% > $1,000	3.00% > $1,000
	4.00% > $2,000	4.00% > $2,000
	4.75% > $3,000	4.75% > $3,000
	5.00% > $100,000	5.00% > $150,000
	5.25% > $125,000	5.25% > $175,000
	5.50% > $150,000	5.50% > $225,000
	5.75% > $250,000	5.75% > $300,000
Mass.	5.10% > $0	5.10% > $0
Mich.	4.25% of federal AGI	4.25% of federal AGI
Minn.	5.35% > $0	5.35% > $0
	7.05% > $25,180	7.05% > $36,820
	7.85% > $82,740	7.85% > $146,270
	9.85% > $155,650	9.85% > $259,420
Miss.	3.00% > $0	3.00% > $0
	4.00% > $5,000	4.00% > $5,000
	5.00% > $10,000	5.00% > $10,000
Mo.	1.50% > $0	1.50% > $0
	2.00% > $1,000	2.00% > $1,000
	2.50% > $2,000	2.50% > $2,000
	3.00% > $3,000	3.00% > $3,000
	3.50% > $4,000	3.50% > $4,000
	4.00% > $5,000	4.00% > $5,000
	4.50% > $6,000	4.50% > $6,000
	5.00% > $7,000	5.00% > $7,000
	5.50% > $8,000	5.50% > $8,000
	6.00% > $9,000	6.00% > $9,000
Mont.	1.00% > $0	1.00% > $0
	2.00% > $2,900	2.00% > $2,900
	3.00% > $5,100	3.00% > $5,100
	4.00% > $7,800	4.00% > $7,800
	5.00% > $10,500	5.00% > $10,500
	6.00% > $13,500	6.00% > $13,500
	6.90% > $17,400	6.90% > $17,400
Nebr.	2.46% > $0	2.46% > $0
	3.51% > $3,060	3.51% > $6,120
	5.01% > $18,370	5.01% > $36,730
	6.84% > $29,590	6.84% > $59,180
Nev.	none	none
N.H.	5.00% > $0; Interest & dividends	5.00% > $0; Interest & dividends
N.J.	1.40% > $0	1.40% > $0
	1.75% > $20,000	1.75% > $20,000
	3.50% > $35,000	2.45% > $50,000
	5.53% > $40,000	3.50% > $70,000
	6.37% > $75,000	5.53% > $80,000
	8.97% > $500,000	6.37% > $150,000
		8.97% > $500,000
N.M.	1.70% > $0	1.70% > $0
	3.20% > $5,500	3.20% > $8,000
	4.70% > $11,000	4.70% > $16,000
	4.90% > $16,000	4.90% > $24,000
N.Y.	4.00% > $0	4.00% > $0
	4.50% > $8,450	4.50% > $17,050
	5.25% > $11,650	5.25% > $23,450
	5.90% > $13,850	5.90% > $27,750
	6.45% > $21,300	6.45% > $42,750
	6.65% > $80,150	6.65% > $160,500
	6.85% > $214,000	6.85% > $321,050
	8.82% > $1,070,350	8.82% > $2,140,900
N.C.	5.75% > $0	5.75% > $0
N.D.	1.10% > $0	1.10% > $0
	2.04% > $37,450	2.04% > $62,600
	2.27% > $90,750	2.27% > $151,200
	2.64% > $189,300	2.64% > $230,450
	2.90% > $411,500	2.90% > $411,500
Ohio	0.50% > $0	0.50% > $0
	0.99% > $5,200	0.99% > $5,200
	1.98% > $10,400	1.98% > $10,400
	2.48% > $15,650	2.48% > $15,650
	2.97% > $20,900	2.97% > $20,900
	3.47% > $41,700	3.47% > $41,700
	3.96% > $83,350	3.96% > $83,350
	4.60% > $104,250	4.60% > $104,250
	5.00% > $208,500	5.00% > $208,500
Okla.	0.50% > $0	0.50% > $0
	1.00% > $1,000	1.00% > $2,000
	2.00% > $2,500	2.00% > $5,000
	3.00% > $3,750	3.00% > $7,500
	4.00% > $4,900	4.00% > $9,800
	5.00% > $7,200	5.00% > $12,200
Ore.	5.00% > $0	5.00% > $0
	7.00% > $3,350	7.00% > $6,500
	9.00% > $8,400	9.00% > $16,300
	9.90% > $125,000	9.90% > $250,000
Pa.	3.07% > $0	3.07% > $0
R.I.	3.75% > $0	3.75% > $0
	4.75% > $60,850	4.75% > $60,850
	5.99% > $138,300	5.99% > $138,300
S.C.	0.00% > $0	0.00% > $0
	3.00% > $2,920	3.00% > $2,920
	4.00% > $5,840	4.00% > $5,840
	5.00% > $8,760	5.00% > $8,760
	6.00% > $11,680	6.00% > $11,680
	7.00% > $14,600	7.00% > $14,600
S.D.	none	none
Tenn.	6.00% > $0; Interest & dividends	6.00% > $0; Interest & dividends
Tex.	none	none
Utah	5.00% > $0	5.00% > $0
Vt.	3.55% > $0	3.55% > $0
	6.80% > $39,900	6.80% > $69,900
	7.80% > $93,400	7.80% > $160,450
	8.80% > $192,400	8.80% > $240,000
	8.95% > $415,600	8.95% > $421,900
Va.	2.00% > $0	2.00% > $0
	3.00% > $3,000	3.00% > $3,000
	5.00% > $5,000	5.00% > $5,000
	5.75% > $17,000	5.75% > $17,000
Wash.	none	none
W.Va.	3.00% > $0	3.00% > $0
	4.00% > $10,000	4.00% > $10,000
	4.50% > $25,000	4.50% > $25,000
	6.00% > $40,000	6.00% > $40,000
	6.50% > $60,000	6.50% > $60,000
Wis.	4.00% > $0	4.00% > $0
	5.84% > $11,150	5.84% > $14,820
	6.27% > $22,230	6.27% > $29,640
	7.65% > $244,750	7.65% > $326,330
Wyo.	none	none
D.C.	4.00% > $0	4.00% > $0
	6.00% > $10,000	6.00% > $10,000
	6.50% > $40,000	6.50% > $40,000
	8.50% > $60,000	8.50% > $60,000
	8.75% > $350,000	8.75% > $350,000

== See also ==
State taxes:

- Sales taxes in the United States
- State income tax

Federal:

- Income tax in the United States
- Federal tax revenue by state
- Federal spending and taxation across states

General:

- Taxation in the United States
