= National Priorities Project =

American non-profit organization

- Formation: 1983
- Founder: Greg Speeter
- Type: Non-profit organization
- Purpose: Make the US Federal Budget accessible for all
- Headquarters: 351 Pleasant Street, Suite B #442
- Location: Northampton, United States
- Website: www.nationalpriorities.org

The National Priorities Project (NPP) is a non-profit, non-partisan federal budget research organization established in 1983 with the mission of educating the American public on the US federal budget, federal spending, and federal revenue. It was founded in 1983 by Greg Speeter with the initial goal of helping community groups understand and respond to federal budget cuts in Massachusetts communities.

During the Reagan administration, Greg Speeter and his friends – Brenda Loew, Ricky Fogel, Alwin Schmidt – found that federal funding for their city Springfield among others had plummeted, adversely impacting their local economies, job opportunities, education, and healthcare. They were later able to successfully convince their district's representative, Silvio Conte, then the ranking member of the House Appropriations Committee, to change his stance on federal spending, making him become a strong supporter of more federal spending for community-based programs with him coming out against a balanced budget amendment that slashed the federal safety net.

== Activities ==
NPP currently focuses its efforts toward public education about the federal budget using their online tool, Federal Budget 101, and their book, The People's Guide to the Federal Budget, featuring a foreword by noted author Barbara Ehrenreich.

The group also focuses on issues such as taxation, government debt, and the openness of governmental actions. Moreover, it examines federal expenditures on defense, education, healthcare, and various other social initiatives.
