= Healthy Forests Initiative =

Law proposed by President George W. Bush

Healthy Forests Restoration Act of 2003
- Long title: An act to improve the capacity of the Secretary of Agriculture and the Secretary of the Interior to conduct hazardous fuels reduction projects on National Forest System lands and Bureau of Land Management lands aimed at protecting communities, watersheds, and certain other at-risk lands from catastrophic wildfire, to enhance efforts to protect watersheds and address threats to forest and rangeland health, including catastrophic wildfire, across the landscape, and for other purposes.
- Nicknames: Healthy Forests Initiative
- Enacted by: the 108th United States Congress

Citations
- Public law: Public Law 108-148

Legislative history
- Introduced in the House of Representatives by Scott McInnis (R–CA) on May 1, 2003; Committee consideration by United States House Committee on Agriculture, United States House Committee on Resources, United States House Committee on Judiciary, United States Senate Committee on Agriculture, Nutrition, and Forestry; Passed the House on May 20, 2003 (); Passed the Senate on October 30, 2003 (); Signed into law by President George W. Bush on December 3, 2003

The Healthy Forests Initiative (HFI), officially the Healthy Forests Restoration Act of 2003, is a piece of environmental legislation passed by the 108th United States Congress and signed by President George W. Bush, following the forest fires of 2002 which were devastatingly widespread. Its stated intent is to reduce the threat of destructive wildfires. The law seeks to accomplish this by allowing timber harvests on protected National Forest's land. The law streamlined the permitting process for timber harvests in National Forests by adding new categorical exclusions to the National Forest Service's list of categorical exclusions from the environmental impact assessment process.

Supporters of the law contend that this will reduce wildfire risk by thinning overstocked stands, clearing away vegetation and trees to create shaded fuel breaks, providing funding and guidance to reduce or eliminate hazardous fuels in National Forests, improving forest fire fighting, and researching new methods to halt destructive insects. To proponents, much of the basis for the law revolves around the overcrowding of forests due to the suppression of low-intensity fires. The resulting buildup of ground fuels and trees is thought to have increased the size and severity of wildfires in the United States.

Detractors of the law contend that the bill opens previously protected forest areas to logging, often unnecessarily or under false pretense. Disagreement exists concerning the role of private logging companies in thinning stands and clearing fire-breaks. The HFI also requires that communities within the "wildland–urban interface" create "community wildfire protection plans." Community wildfire protection plans designate areas adjacent to communities that should be thinned so that crown fires will not directly burn into communities.

== Controversy ==
The Bush administration claims broad support for HFI, stating on the official website: "The Administration and a bipartisan majority in Congress supported the legislation and are joined by a variety of environmental conservation groups." This statement ignores the opposition to HFI by conservation groups such as the Sierra Club, the Natural Resources Defense Council, The Wilderness Society, and the John Muir Project. Supporters include the Society of American Foresters, local fire protection agencies, and a number of hunting and fishing advocacy groups.

In March 2006, it was reported in the news section of the ACS journal Environmental Science & Technology that timber interests created a front group called Project Protect to help pass the Healthy Forests legislation.

=== HFI support ===
Proponents of HFI believe that high-intensity fires in the Western United States have increased in intensity and size in recent years. This is largely a result of fire suppression, which has created a buildup in fuels and ladder fuels, as well as climate change. Supporters believe this act may be able to simplify the NEPA process for projects which are meant to reduce the susceptibility of National forests to forest fires; reducing the risk of conflagrations that endanger human lives, destroy valuable forests, and can reduce the quality of habitat for late several wildlife species.

The act is specific, that projects under the act should focus on small tree removal, and maximize retention of large trees. Furthermore, supporters of the act point to the fact that projects under the act must, before going through NEPA, be approved by a collaborative group, which should include all interested and affected parties (including adjacent land owners, special use permit holders in the area, and environmental groups). The intent of NEPA is to allow the public to have input on projects, influence the topics of analysis for projects, and develop alternatives for projects. Collaborative groups may allow for more input and influence on projects from the public than the normal NEPA process, despite the fact that projects under the act go through an expedited NEPA process.

The cost of fighting major wildfires caused by years of neglect have become entirely too expensive for USFS budgetary expenses. American insurance companies have raised the issue of structural destruction caused by super forest fires is exceeding 2 billion dollars a year. From a historical standpoint looking to the Sierra Nevada Mountains prior to the inception of the Forest Service the forests were burned every year by the ranchers who ran livestock in these regions. Consequently, the amount of fuel left on the forest floor was minor, resulting in low intensity fires. The fires were typically lit during the first storms of the winter and crept along the forest floor. Low branches and fallen trees were consumed in the low intensity larger logs tended to burn beneath the snow during the winter.

Positive advantages of this practical method of forest management was that the ash left behind fertilized the forest trees and plants and bark beetles which are ravishing so much of the Western Forests were killed before boring into trees. Pinecones were also liberated by the heat to release their seeds into the soil. In the spring natural grasses provided extensive grazing opportunities for livestock and wildlife inhabiting the forest regions and also provided critical anti-erosion during heavy rains. To return the forest to such pristine grandness will require extensive planning to remove the more dense fuel loads and careful prescribed burns to liquidate remaining pockets of heavy fuels left on the forest floors by 70 years of neglect.

=== HFI opposition ===
Opponents of the nicknamed "No Tree Left Behind" Act point out that logging companies will be allowed to unnecessarily cut large diameter trees under a false pretense, while neglecting the greater issue of ladder fuels (such as brush and small trees) and possibly leaving debris that would add to extremely volatile ground fuels. Furthermore, forest fires occur naturally and are critical to the long-term survival of many forests, since many trees will only grow once they detect that a fire has occurred since this gives them access to sunlight. Some opponents also criticize the blanket prescription of thinning to forests where low intensity fires did not historically play a pivotal role.

Furthermore, some saplings only grow after forest fires have cleared away older and dead trees; if humans intervene by preventing natural forest fires from occurring for too long, the forest will eventually die and grow back very slowly.

== Litigation ==
In 2004, the Sierra Club and Sierra Forest Legacy (formerly named Sierra Nevada Forest Protection Campaign) brought a lawsuit challenging one aspect of HFI. The National Environmental Policy Act requires preparation of an environmental impact statement (EIS) for agency actions. Under HFI, the Forest Service had promulgated a "categorical exclusion" that eliminated the EIS requirement for timber sales up to 1,000 acres (400 ha) and prescribed burns up to 4,500 acres (1,800 ha). On December 5, 2007, in Sierra Club v. Bosworth, the Ninth Circuit held that the Forest Service's promulgation of the categorical exclusion "was arbitrary and capricious".
