= Third-party and independent candidates for the 2020 United States presidential election =

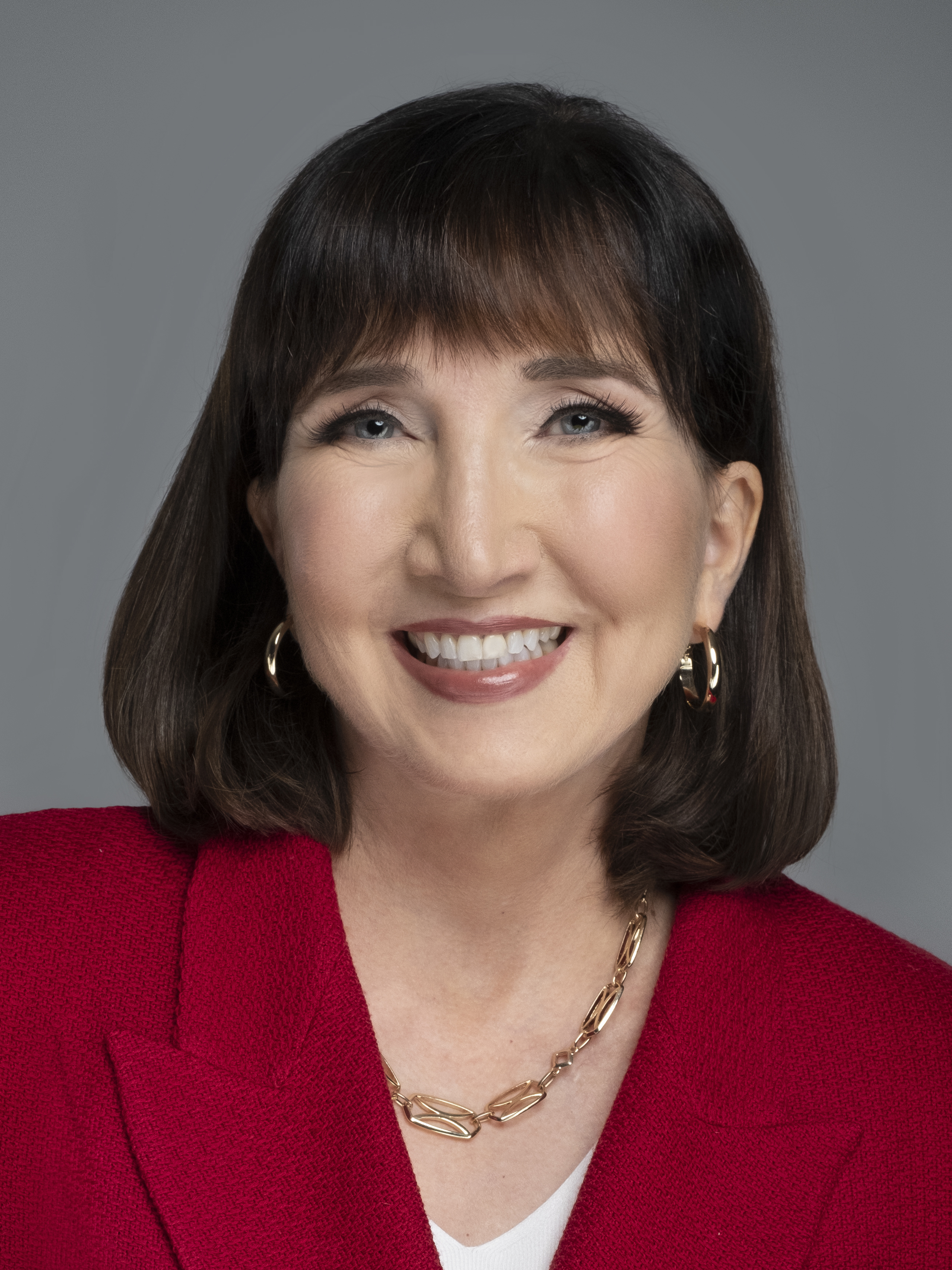

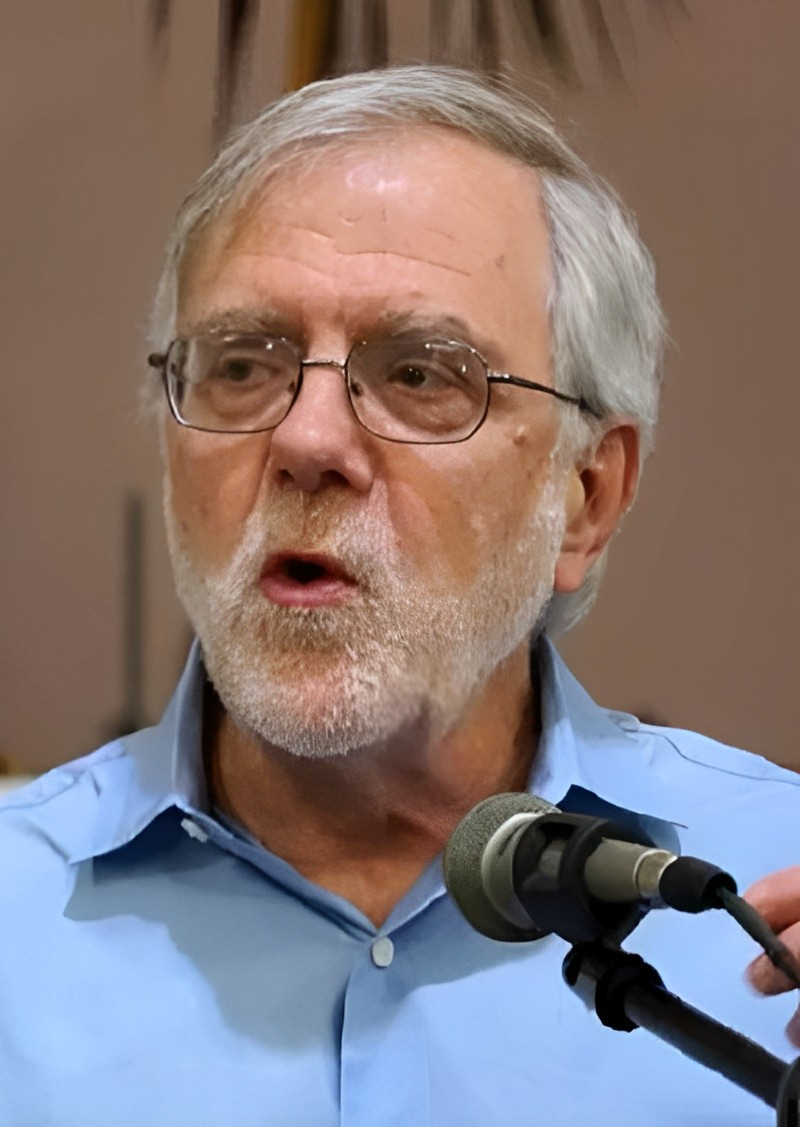

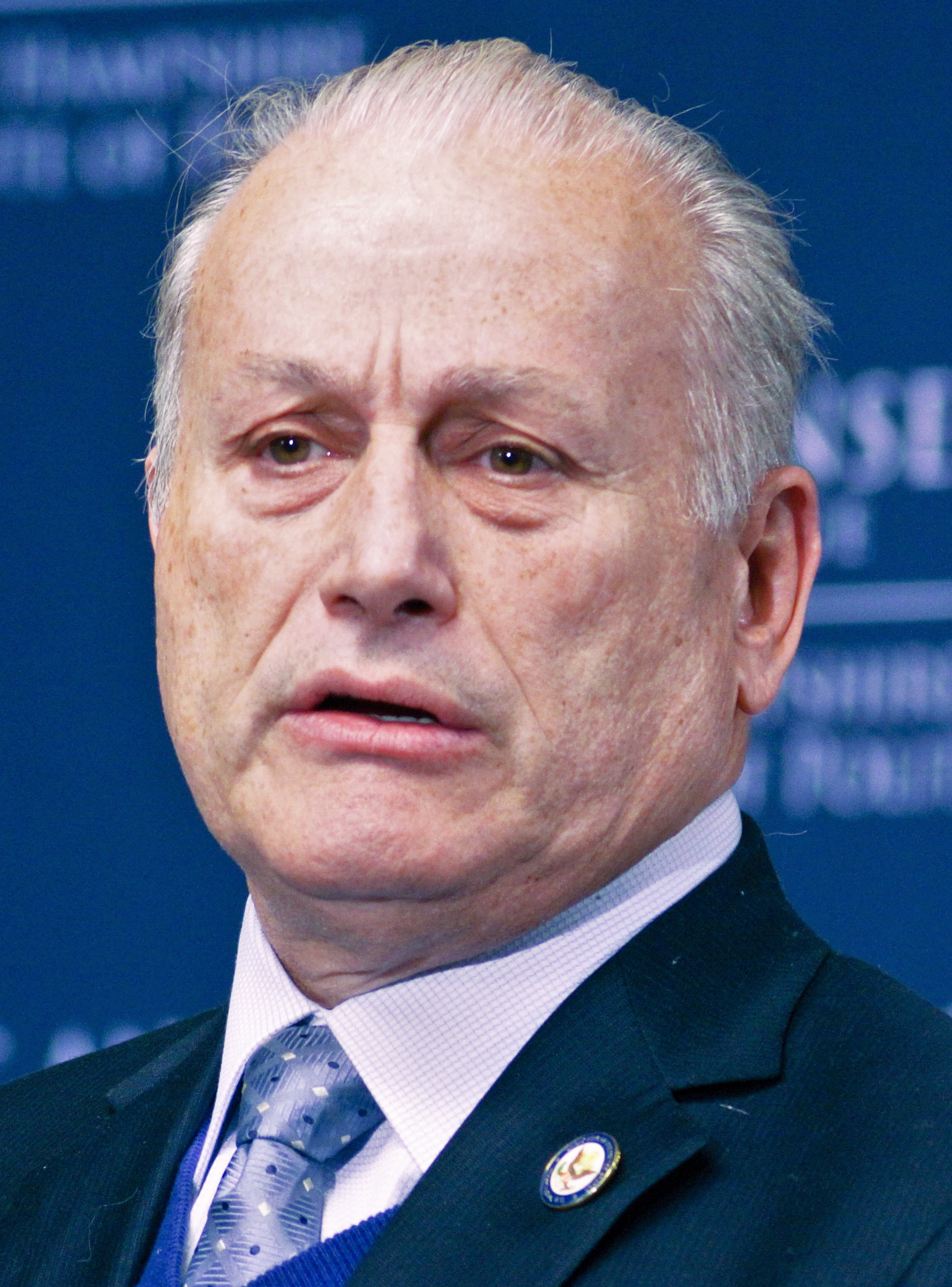

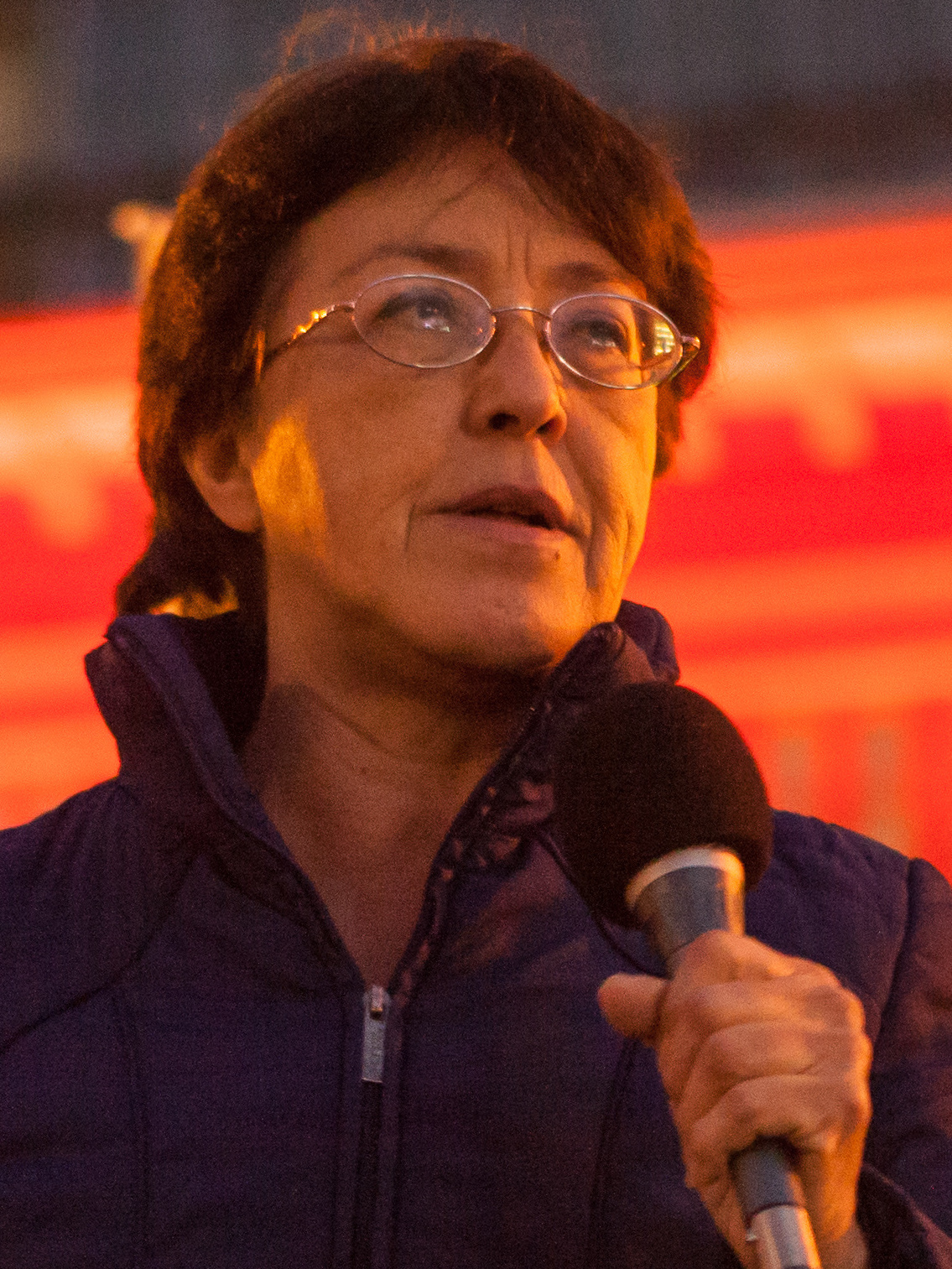

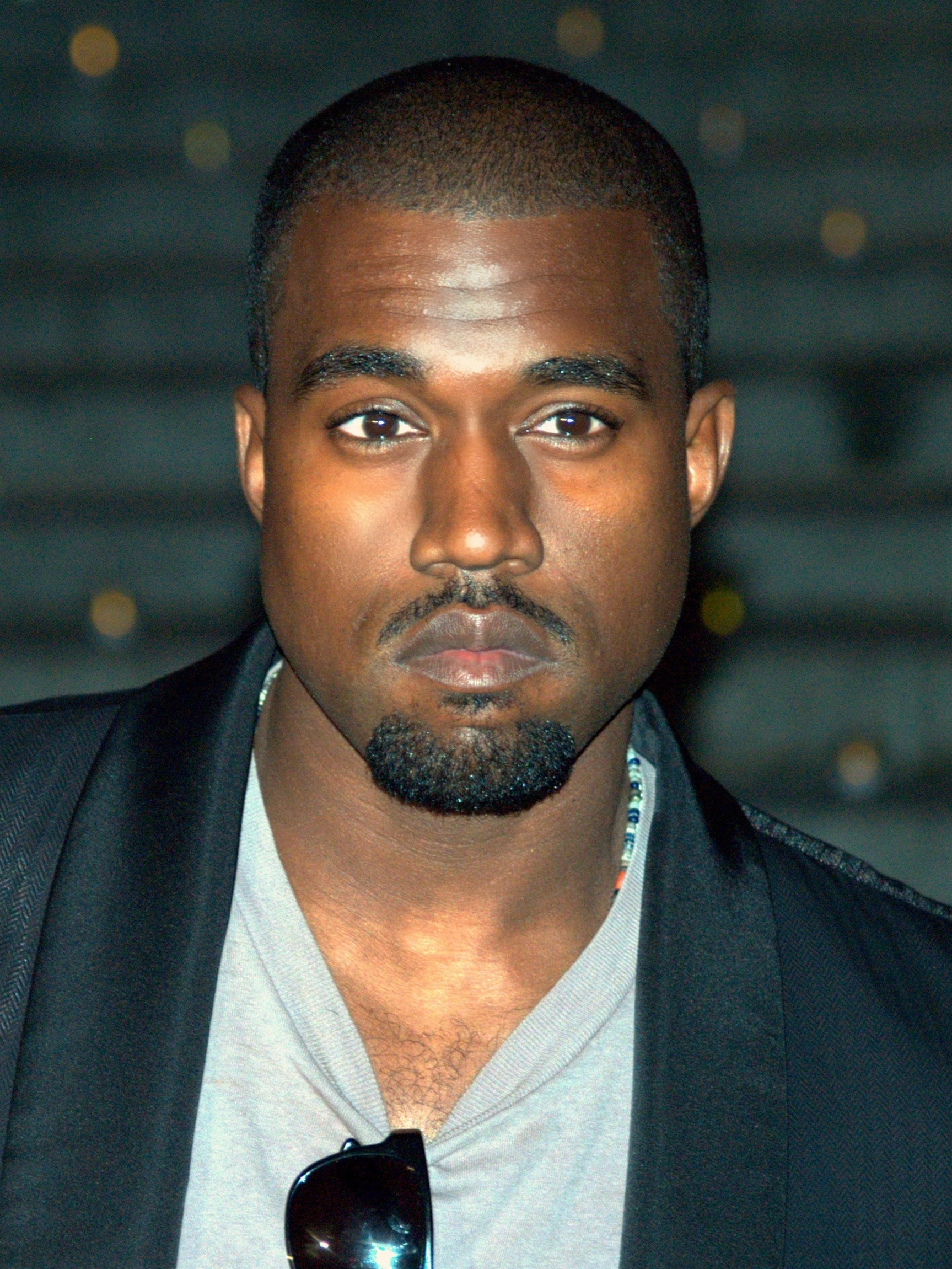

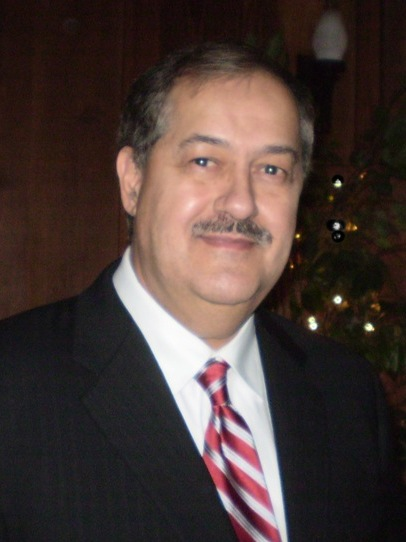

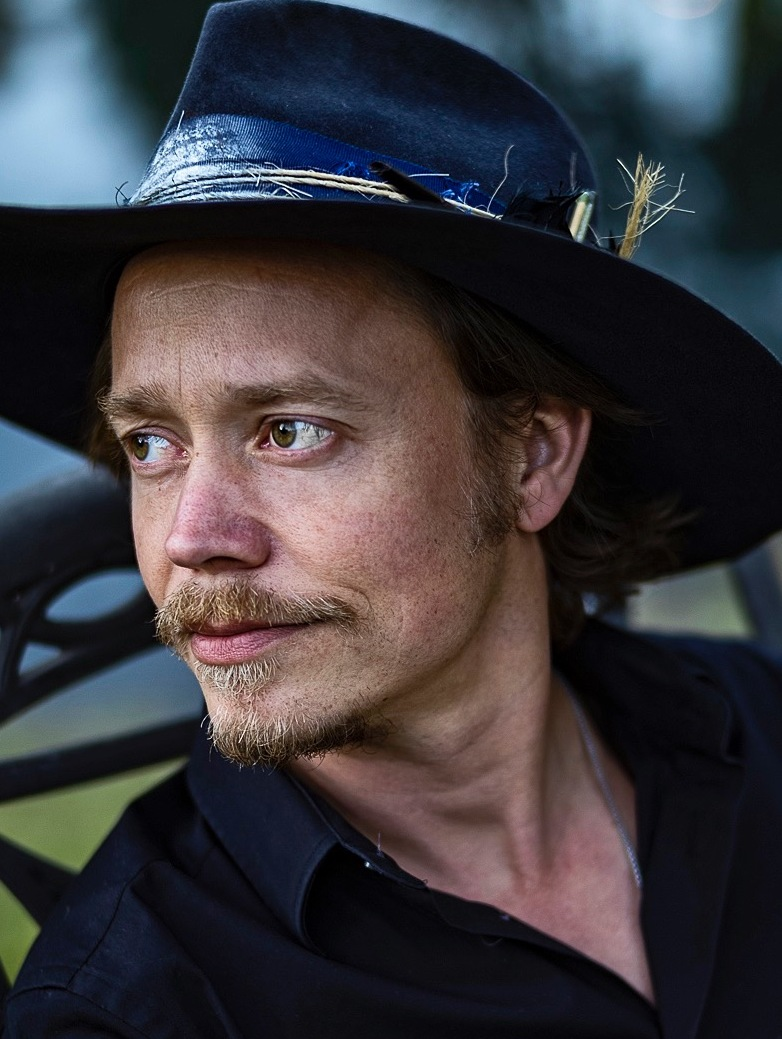

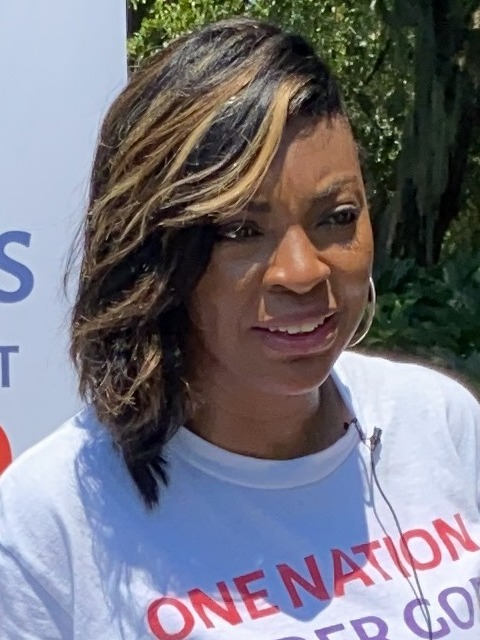
Nominee	Jo Jorgensen	Howie Hawkins	Rocky De La Fuente
Party	Libertarian	Green	Alliance
Alliance		Socialist	American Independent; Reform; Natural Law
Home state	South Carolina	New York	California
Running mate	Spike Cohen	Angela Nicole Walker	Darcy Richardson
Popular vote	1,865,535	407,068	88,241
Percentage	1.18%	0.26%	0.06%
Nominee	Gloria La Riva	Kanye West	Don Blankenship
Party	Socialism and Liberation	Independent	Constitution
Alliance	Peace and Freedom; Liberty Union	Birthday
Home state	California	Wyoming	West Virginia
Running mate	Sunil Freeman	Michelle Tidball	William Mohr
Popular vote	85,685	70,950	60,080
Percentage	0.05%	0.04%	0.04%
Nominee	Brock Pierce	Brian T. Carroll	Jade Simmons
Party	Independent	American Solidarity	Independent
Alliance	Independence Party
Home state	Puerto Rico	California	Texas
Running mate	Karla Ballard	Amar Patel	Claudeliah J. Roze
Popular vote	49,773	40,365	7,211
Percentage	0.03%	0.03%	0.005%

This article lists third-party and independent candidates, also jointly known as minor candidates, associated with the 2020 United States presidential election.

"Third party" is a term commonly used in the United States in reference to political parties other than the Democratic and Republican parties. An independent candidate is one not affiliated with any political party.

The list of candidates whose names were printed on the ballot or who were accepted as write-in candidates varied by state. More than a hundred candidates were on the ballot or formally registered as write-in candidates in at least one state.

All minor candidates combined received less than 2% of the national votes.

== Summary ==
Appearing on every ballot, Libertarian Party nominee Jo Jorgensen performed the best of any third-party candidate, receiving 1,865,535 votes. Jorgensen received 187,910 votes in California, her best state vote total. She received 2.63% of the vote in South Dakota, her best state by percentage. Jorgensen was the only candidate to receive more than 2% of the vote in any one state.

Green Party candidate Howie Hawkins was the only other third-party candidate to receive more than 1% of the vote in any state, which he did in Maine. Hawkins also received his highest vote total in California, with 81,032 votes.

In Nevada, None of These Candidates received 1% of the vote.
Show/hide: [presidential candidates] [vice presidential candidates] [parties] [ballot access]

2020 presidential candidates that received at least 0.01% of the vote
Presidential candidate		Joe Biden	Donald Trump	Jo Jorgensen	Howie Hawkins	Rocky De La Fuente	Gloria La Riva	Kanye West (Note: In California, Kanye West was nominated by the American Independent Party as Rocky De La Fuente's vice presidential candidate, without either candidate's consent.)	Don Blankenship	Brock Pierce	Brian Carroll		
Vice presidential candidate		Kamala Harris	Mike Pence	Spike Cohen	Angela Walker	Darcy Richardson	Sunil Freeman (Note: The party's original vice presidential candidate was Leonard Peltier, who withdrew for health reasons but remained listed in Illinois, Minnesota and Texas.)	Michelle Tidball	William Mohr	Karla Ballard	Amar Patel		
Party or label (Note: In some states, some candidates were listed as independent or unaffiliated rather than their political party or label.)		Democratic (Note: Also nominated by the Working Families Party in New York. Additional nomination by the Independent Party of Oregon was not listed on the ballot.)	Republican (Note: Also nominated by the Conservative Party in New York.)	Libertarian	Green (Note: In Alaska, the Green Party nominated Jesse Ventura and Cynthia McKinney instead of the national candidates Howie Hawkins and Angela Walker, who then registered in that state as write-in candidates representing the Socialist Party USA. In Rhode Island, the Green Party refused to nominate a presidential candidate to the ballot.)	Alliance (Note: Nominated by the American Independent Party in California (with Kanye West for vice president), the Reform Party in Florida, and the Natural Law Party in Michigan.)	PSL (Note: Nominated by the Peace and Freedom Party in California, and the Liberty Union Party in Vermont.)	Birthday	Constitution (Note: In New Mexico, the Constitution Party nominated Sheila "Samm" Tittle and David Carl Sandidge instead of the national candidates. In Alaska, Sheila "Samm" Tittle and John Wagner registered as a write-in candidates representing the Constitution Party in addition to the party's nomination of the national candidates to the ballot. In Arizona, where the Constitution Party did not have ballot access, Daniel Clyde Cummings and Ryan Huber registered as a write-in candidates representing the party instead of the national candidates.)	Independent (Note: Nominated by the American Shopping Party in Hawaii, and the Independence Party in New York. Registered with label Freedom and Prosperity in Louisiana.)	American Solidarity		
EV access	Ballot	538	538	538	381	183	195	84	165	115	66		
EV access	Total	538	538	538	511	289	401	243	305	285	463		
State/DC	EV	1	2	3	4	5	6	7	8	9	10	Others	Total votes
Alabama	9	849,624	1,441,170	25,176	(Note: May have received write-in votes, which were not reported individually and are included in others.)							7,312	2,323,282
Alaska	3	153,778	189,951	8,897		318			1,127	825		4,634	359,530
Arizona	11	1,672,143	1,661,686	51,465	1,557		190					285	3,387,326
Arkansas	6	423,932	760,647	13,133	2,980	1,321	1,336	4,099	2,108	2,141	1,713	5,659	1,219,069
California	55	11,110,639	6,006,518	187,910	81,032	60,162	51,038			185	2,605	1,291	17,501,380
Colorado	9	1,804,352	1,364,607	52,460	8,986	636	1,035	8,089	5,061	572	2,515	8,667	3,256,980
Connecticut	7	1,080,831	714,717	20,230	7,538	13		255			219	54	1,823,857
Delaware	3	296,268	200,603	5,000	2,139		14	169		5	87	61	504,346
D. of Columbia	3	317,323	18,586	2,036	1,726		855			693		3,137	344,356
Florida	29	5,297,045	5,668,731	70,324	14,721	5,966	5,712		3,902		854	201	11,067,456
Georgia (Note: This table reflects the results certified by the state, which recorded fewer votes in Fulton County than those reported by the county.)	16	2,473,633	2,461,854	62,229	1,013		159		61		701	310	4,999,960
Hawaii	4	366,130	196,864	5,539	3,822				931	1,183		–	574,469
Idaho	4	287,021	554,119	16,404	407	1,491	49	3,632	1,806	2,808	163	34	867,934
Illinois	20	3,471,915	2,446,891	66,544	30,494		8,046		18		9,548	288	6,033,744
Indiana	11	1,242,498	1,729,857	58,901	989						895	70	3,033,210
Iowa	6	759,061	897,672	19,637	3,075	1,082		3,210	1,707	544		4,883	1,690,871
Kansas	6	570,323	771,406	30,574	669			332		4	579	99	1,373,986
Kentucky	8	772,474	1,326,646	26,234	716		98	6,483		3,599	408	110	2,136,768
Louisiana	8	856,034	1,255,776	21,645			987	4,897	860	749	2,497	4,617	2,148,062
Maine	4	435,072	360,737	14,152	8,230	1,183						87	819,461
Maryland	10	1,985,023	976,414	33,488	15,799	26	125	1,117		16	795	24,227	3,037,030
Massachusetts	11	2,382,202	1,167,202	47,013	18,658						164 (Note: Write-in votes unofficially compiled from results reported by local governments. Included in others.)	16,327	3,631,402
Michigan	16	2,804,040	2,649,852	60,381	13,718	2,986			7,235		963	127	5,539,302
Minnesota	10	1,717,077	1,484,065	34,976	10,033	5,611	1,210	7,940	75	5,651	1,037	9,496	3,277,171
Mississippi	6	539,398	756,764	8,026	1,498			3,657	1,279	659	1,161	1,317	1,313,759
Missouri	10	1,253,014	1,718,736	41,205	8,283		64		3,919		664	77	3,025,962
Montana	3	244,786	343,602	15,252								34	603,674
Nebraska	5	374,583	556,846	20,283								4,671	956,383
Nevada	6	703,486	669,890	14,783					3,138			14,079	1,405,376
New Hampshire	4	424,937	365,660	13,236	217			82				2,073	806,205
New Jersey	14	2,608,400	1,883,313	31,677	14,202	2,728	2,928	909 (Note: Write-in votes unofficially compiled from results reported by counties. Not included in totals.)	2,954	27	330	3,255 (Note: Additionally 14,049 write-in votes unofficially compiled from results reported by counties, not included in totals.)	4,549,457
New Mexico	5	501,614	401,894	12,585	4,426		1,640					1,806	923,965
New York	29	5,244,886	3,251,997	60,383	32,832	25	437	2,219	55	22,656	999	372	8,616,861
North Carolina	15	2,684,292	2,758,775	48,678	12,195				7,549			13,315	5,524,804
North Dakota	3	115,042	235,751	9,371								1,860	362,024
Ohio	18	2,679,165	3,154,834	67,569	18,812						1,450	372	5,922,202
Oklahoma	7	503,890	1,020,280	24,731				5,597		2,547		3,654	1,560,699
Oregon	7	1,340,383	958,448	41,582	11,831							22,077	2,374,321
Pennsylvania	20	3,458,229	3,377,674	79,380	1,282 (Note: Write-in votes reported by the Federal Election Commission. May have received more write-in votes included in others.)						362	20,049	6,936,976
Rhode Island	4	307,486	199,922	5,053		923	847				767	2,759	517,757
South Carolina	9	1,091,541	1,385,103	27,916	6,907	1,862						–	2,513,329
South Dakota	3	150,471	261,043	11,095								–	422,609
Tennessee	11	1,143,711	1,852,475	29,877	4,545	1,860	2,301	10,279	5,365		762	2,676	3,053,851
Texas	38	5,259,126	5,890,347	126,243	33,396		350				2,785 (Note: Result certified by the state, which did not include 422 write-in votes for this candidate reported by Harris County.)	2,809	11,315,056
Utah	6	560,282	865,140	38,447	5,053		1,139	7,213	5,551	2,623	368	2,473	1,488,289
Vermont	3	242,820	112,704	3,608	1,310	48	166	1,269	208	100	209	4,986	367,428
Virginia	13	2,413,568	1,962,430	64,761								19,765	4,460,524
Washington	12	2,369,612	1,584,651	80,500	18,289		4,840					29,739	4,087,631
West Virginia	5	235,984	545,382	10,687	2,599	0	9		25	5		40	794,731
Wisconsin	10	1,630,866	1,610,184	38,491	1,089		110	411	5,146		5,259	6,485	3,298,041
Wyoming	3	73,491	193,559	5,768						2,208		1,739	276,765
Total	538	81,283,501	74,223,975	1,865,535	407,068	88,241	85,685	70,950	60,080	49,773	40,365	254,458	158,429,631

Vote percentages, shaded according to percentage of the vote for Jo Jorgensen Libertarian Party candidate

Percentage of votes cast for Kanye West by state

Percentage of votes cast for Kanye West by county

Other declared candidates who received more than 1,000 votes
Presidential candidate		Jade Simmons	Alyson Kennedy	Bill Hammons	Jerome Segal	Dario Hunter	Phil Collins	Jesse Ventura	Mark Charles	Joe McHugh	Samm Tittle	Connie L. Gammon	John R. Myers	Tom Hoefling	President R19 Boddie	H. Brooke Paige
Vice presidential candidate		Claudeliah J. Roze (Note: In Florida, Melissa Nixon was listed as Jade Simmons's vice presidential candidate.)	Malcolm Jarrett	Eric Bodenstab	John de Graaf	Dawn N. Adams	Billy Joe Parker	Cynthia McKinney	Adrian Wallace	Elizabeth Storm	David C. Sandidge (Note: In Alaska, John Wagner was listed as Sheila "Samm" Tittle's vice presidential candidate.)	Phil Collins	Tiara S. Lusk	Andy Prior	Eric Stoneham	Thomas J. Whitman
Party or label		Becoming One Nation	Socialist Workers	Unity	Bread and Roses	Progressive	Prohibition (Note: The Prohibition Party previously nominated Connie L. Gammon for president and Phil Collins for vice president. After Connie L. Gammon withdrew, the party nominated Phil Collins for president and Billy Joe Parker for vice president. In Arkansas, both sets of candidates remained listed on the ballot.)	Alaska Green	indep.	indep.	Constitution	Prohibition	Life and Liberty	Life, Liberty, Constitution	C.U.P.	Grumpy Old Patriots
EV access	Ballot	15	53	31	13	16	24	3	9	15	5	6	6	8	8	3
EV access	Total	372	120	87	80	157	162	128	296	120	91	76	76	244	294	70
State/DC	EV	11	12	13	14	15	16	17	18	19	20	21	22	23	24	25
Alabama	9															
Alaska	3							2,673								
Arizona	11	236													13	
Arkansas	6						2,812					1,475	1,372			
California	55							611	559							
Colorado	9		354	2,730		379	568		2,011	614				24		
Connecticut	7	22							11							
Delaware	3	28							8					1	1	
D. of Columbia	3															
Florida	29	181														
Georgia	16	181							65						8	
Idaho	4	21												7	0	
Illinois	20	78					3		75						0	
Iowa	6															
Kansas	6	48				1			29					14	0	
Kentucky	8	29							43					20	7	
Louisiana	8	1,626	536	662										668	1,125	
Maine	2															
Maryland	10	131			5,884		10		30					11	4	
Massachusetts	11															
Michigan	16	89												32		
Minnesota	10		643			1			112					12	0	
Mississippi	6						1,317									
Missouri	10	74														
Montana	3	6							23					3	0	
Nebraska	2															
New Hampshire	4															
New Jersey	14	21	1	3,255	1	2	2	35	20					2		
New Mexico	5										1,806					
New York	29	180				9	10		112	0						
North Carolina	15	119														
North Dakota	3															
Ohio	18	212				27								114	3	
Oklahoma	7	3,654														
Oregon	7					4,988										
Pennsylvania	20															
Rhode Island	4															
Tennessee	11	68	2,576											31	1	
Texas	38													337	2,012 (Note: The results certified by Texas recorded 1,866 write-in votes for candidate President R19 Boddie in Bexar County, while the county reported that number as the total of all write-in votes for president and no vote for that candidate. These disputed votes are included in the numbers shown in the table in this article, but disconsidered for ordering the candidates and for inclusion in the main section.)	
Utah	6	186								2,229				51	6	
Vermont	3	1 (Note: Unofficially compiled from results reported by the state. Included in others.)	195	1	65		137	7	7							1,175
Virginia	13															
Washington	12		2,487													
West Virginia	5	6							11					6	0	
Wisconsin	10	36							52						5	
Wyoming	3															
Total	538	7,211	6,791	6,647	5,949	5,405	4,857	3,284	3,141	2,843	1,806	1,475	1,372	1,331	3,185	1,175

Other candidates on the ballot or with write-in registration in at least one state/DC
Presidential candidate	Vice presidential candidate	Party or label	EV access																																										
Presidential candidate	Vice presidential candidate	Party or label	EV access		AL	AK	AZ	CA	CO	CT	DE	DC	FL	GA	ID	IL	IN	IA	KS	KY	ME	MD	MA	MI	MN	MO	MT	NE	NH	NJ	NY	ND	OH	OR	PA	RI	TN	TX	UT	VT	VA	WA	WV	WI	WY
Presidential candidate	Vice presidential candidate	Party or label	Ballot	Total	9	3	11	55	9	7	3	3	29	16	4	20	11	6	6	8	4	10	11	16	10	10	3	5	4	14	29	3	18	7	20	4	11	38	6	3	13	12	5	10	3
Blake Huber	Frank Atwood	Approval Voting	12	79																																									
Kyle K. Kopitke	Nathan R. Sorenson (Note: In Vermont, Taja Yvonne Iwanow was listed as Kyle Kopitke's vice presidential candidate.)	Independent American	12	79																																									
Joseph Kishore	Norissa Santa Cruz	Socialist Equality	9	188																																									
Princess Khadijah; M. Jacob-Fambro	Khadijah M. Jacob	independent	9	144																																									
Cancer Scott	Jennifer Tepool	independent	9	79																																									
Ricki Sue King	Dayna R. Chandler	Genealogy Know; Your Family History	6	70																																									
Christopher Lafontaine	Michael Speed	independent	3	70																																									
Gary Swing	David Olszta	Boiling Frog	3	70																																									
Keith McCormic	Sam Blasiak	Bull Moose	3	70																																									
Richard Duncan	Mitch Bupp	independent	3	70																																									
Zachary Scalf	Matthew Lyda	independent	3	70																																									
Kasey Wells	Rachel Wells	independent	0	394																																									
Shawn Howard	Alyssa Howard	independent	0	243																																									
Todd Cella	Tim Cella	independent	0	186																																									
Barbara Bellar	Kendra Bryant	Republican (Note: Registered as write-in candidates representing the Republican Party in addition to the party's nomination of the national candidates to the ballot.)	0	179																																									
Deborah Rouse	Sheila Cannon	independent	0	167																																									
Mary Ruth; Caro Simmons	Sherrie Dow	Write-in	0	148																																									
Randall Foltyniewicz		independent	0	131																																									
Marcus Sykes	Unicole Unicron (Note: In Minnesota, James Edward McFadden was listed as Marcus Sykes's vice presidential candidate.)	Populous	0	127																																									
Abram Loeb	Jennifer Jairala	independent	0	124																																									
Dennis A. Ball	Richard A. Sanders	American Party of America – American; National Committee	0	123																																									
Albert Raley	Darlene Raley	Republican	0	120																																									
Michael Laboch	Raechelle Pope	independent	0	120																																									
Kathryn Gibson		independent	0	114																																									
John Manimas	Henry Jackson	Real Democracy	0	111																																									
Andy Williams		independent	0	110																																									
Chris Franklin		independent	0	109																																									
Jesse Cuellar	Jimmy Monreal	independent	0	108																																									
Robert Morrow	Anne Beckett	independent	0	108																																									
Katherine Forbes	Heath King	independent	0	106																																									
Christopher Stried		independent	0	101																																									
Susan B. Lochocki		independent	0	100																																									
Angela Marie; Walls-Windhauser	Charles Tolbert	independent	0	99																																									
David A. Martin		independent	0	99																																									
Paul Hodges		independent	0	99																																									
Richard C. Montanye		independent	0	99																																									
Ryan Ehrenreich	Veronica Ehrenreich	independent	0	98																																									
Peter W. Sherrill		independent	0	96																																									
Silvia Stagg		Republican	0	91																																									
Bryan Robinson		independent	0	90																																									
David J. Nash		independent	0	90																																									
James T. Struck		independent	0	90																																									
Jeremy D. Higgs		independent	0	90																																									
John Farney		independent	0	90																																									
Kevin McKee		independent	0	90																																									
Lowell Martin Seida		independent	0	90																																									
David C. Byrne	Tony N. Reed	C.C.U.S.A.	0	89																																									
Loren Collins		independent	0	86																																									
Tara Renee Hunter		independent	0	86																																									
Mitchell Williams		independent	0	84																																									
Demetra Wysinger	Cedric D. Jefferson	WXYZ New Day	0	83																																									
Sharon Wallace	Karen M. Short (Note: Karen M. Short was listed as Sharon Wallace's vice presidential candidate in Maryland, but they were listed as separate candidates in the District of Columbia.)	Democratic (Note: Registered as write-in candidates representing the Democratic Party in addition to the party's nomination of the national candidates to the ballot.)	0	83																																									
Ajay Sood	Richard Mende	independent	0	82																																									
Andrew M. Kelley		independent	0	82																																									
Betsy P. Elgar		Constitutional	0	82																																									
Michael M. Lawlor		independent	0	82																																									
Philip D. Boynton		independent	0	82																																									
Ronald B. Smith		Democratic	0	82																																									
Rossi Wade		independent	0	82																																									
Shereen A. Elbaz		Democratic	0	82																																									
Steven Spenser		independent	0	82																																									
Take Jones		independent	0	82																																									
Daniel C. Cummings	Ryan Huber	Constitution	0	81																																									
David O. Descoteaux	Michael J. Adams	Twelve Visions	0	81																																									
James L. Johnson		independent	0	81																																									
Joe Schriner		independent	0	81																																									
Valerie McCray		independent	0	81																																									
Andrew Palmiscno	Kyle Palmiscno	independent	0	80																																									
Benjamin Schwalb		independent	0	80																																									
Edward Shlikas		independent	0	80																																									
Frederick Michael; Carl Frederickson	Todd William Larson	independent	0	80																																									
Jason Stanek	Taylor Motari	independent	0	80																																									
Johnson Lee		independent	0	80																																									
Patrick Whitcomb	Jason Horine	independent	0	80																																									
Ryan J. Gilmer	Brent S. Duncan	independent	0	80																																									
Timothy A. Stevens	Susan C. Fletcher	independent	0	78																																									
Jeffrey J. Klojzy	Thomas A. LeMay	independent	0	77																																									
Karynn Weinstein	David Weinstein	independent	0	77																																									
Jason R. Edwards	Lisa D. Edwards	independent	0	76																																									
Lois Marie; Gillapsie-Greenwood		independent	0	75																																									
James O. Ogle		independent	0	74																																									
M.D. Mitchell	Margaret M. Bayliss	Dirigo	0	74																																									
Timothy A. Helgerson		independent	0	74																																									
Karen M. Short		independent	0	73																																									
William Toggle		Democratic	0	73																																									

Legend
Listed on ballot
Registered as write-in candidate
Write-in candidates allowed without registration
Not a candidate in the state/DC

== Candidates who received more than 2,000 votes ==
The candidates below are listed in order of national vote totals.

=== Jo Jorgensen, Libertarian Party ===
Libertarian candidate Jo Jorgensen was the only minor candidate to breach a million votes nationwide, getting more than 1% of the national votes and more than the margin between the two major candidates, Donald Trump and Joe Biden, in several battleground states. She was also the only minor party candidate who was on the ballot in every state, plus Washington D.C.

Ballot access by state On ballot

2020 Libertarian Party ticket
Jo Jorgensen	Spike Cohen
for President	for Vice President
Clemson University lecturer from South Carolina	Podcaster and businessman from South Carolina
Campaign

Other candidates for the Libertarian Party nomination
Jacob Hornberger	Vermin Supreme	John Monds	Jim Gray	Adam Kokesh	Dan Behrman
Founder and President of the Future of Freedom Foundation	Performance artist, activist, and political satirist	Former President of the Grady County, Georgia NAACP	Former presiding judge for the Superior Court of Orange County, California	Libertarian and anti-war political activist	Software engineer and podcaster
		—N/a	—N/a	—N/a	
—N/a	Campaign	Campaign	Campaign	Campaign	—N/a
W: May 23, 2020; 8,986 votes (20.55%); 236 first round delegates	W: May 23, 2020; 4,288 votes (9.81%); 171 first round delegates	W: May 23, 2020; 1 vote (<0.01%); 147 first round delegates	W: May 23, 2020; 42 votes (0.10%); 98 first round delegates	W: May 23, 2020; 2,728 votes (6.24%); 77 first round delegates	W: May 23, 2020; 2,337 votes (5.34%); 0 first round delegates
Sam Robb	Justin Amash	Ken Armstrong	Lincoln Chafee	Max Abramson	Kim Ruff
Software engineer and author Former naval officer	U.S. representative from MI-03 (2011–present)	U.S. Coast Guard commissioned officer (1977–1994)	Governor of Rhode Island (2011–2015) and U.S. Senator from Rhode Island (1999–2007)	New Hampshire State Representative (2014–2016; 2018–present)	Vice chair of the LPRadical Caucus
	—N/a	—N/a	—N/a		
Campaign	Campaign	Campaign	Campaign	Campaign	—N/a
W: May 23, 2020; 1,943 votes (5.06%); 0 first round delegates	W: May 17, 2020; 3 votes (0.01%); 17 first round delegates	W: April 29, 2020; 3,509 votes (8.03%); 0 first round delegates	W: April 5, 2020; 294 votes (0.67%); 1 (write-in) first round delegate	W: March 3, 2020; 2,052 votes (5.34%); 0 first round delegates	W: January 11, 2020; 3,045 votes (7.93%); 0 first round delegates

=== Howie Hawkins, Green Party ===
Ballot access by state On ballot Write-in

2020 Green Party ticket
Howie Hawkins	Angela Walker
for President	for Vice President
Co-founder of the Green Party from New York	ATU Local 998 Legislative Director (2011–2013) from South Carolina
Campaign
Additional party nominations:	Legal Marijuana Now (Note: The Legal Marijuana Now Party originally nominated Mark Elsworth and later Rudy Reyes for president but in August decided to nominate Hawkins.); Socialist Alternative; Socialist Party USA

Other candidates for the Green Party nomination
Dario Hunter Officially recognized (Note: Official recognition by the Green Party is needed in order to receive its nomination.)	Sedinam Moyowasifza-Curry	Dennis Lambert	Jesse Ventura	David Rolde Officially recognized
Member of the Youngstown Board of Education (2016–2020)	Activist	Documentary filmmaker	Governor of Minnesota (1999–2003)	Co-chair of the Greater Boston Chapter of the Green-Rainbow Party
		—N/a	—N/a	—N/a
Campaign	—N/a	—N/a	—N/a	—N/a
89.5 delegates (20.1%); 3,087 votes	10.5 delegates (3.0%); 2,229 votes	9 delegates (2.6%); 2,029 votes	8 delegates (1.7%); 49 votes	5.5 delegates (1.6%); 960 votes
			No candidacy	

=== Rocky De La Fuente, Alliance Party ===
Ballot access by state On ballot Write-in

2020 Alliance Party ticket
Rocky De La Fuente	Darcy Richardson
for President	for Vice President
Businessman and perennial candidate from California	Author, historian and political activist from Florida
Campaign
Additional party nominations:	Reform Party; Natural Law Party of Michigan; American Independent Party

Other candidates for the Reform Party nomination
Max Abramson	Johannon Ben Zion	Phil Collins	Souraya Faas
New Hampshire State Representative from the 20th Rockingham district	Former 2020 presidential nominee of the Transhumanist Party from Arizona	Former Libertyville Township Trustee and 2020 presidential nominee of the Prohibition Party from Nevada	Former member of the Miami-Dade County Republican executive committee from Florida
Campaign		Campaign	
4 votes	1 vote	0 votes	Withdrew before convention (endorsed De La Fuente)

==== Reform Party nomination ====
At its national convention, the Reform Party of the United States of America voted to nominate De La Fuente for president and Richardson for vice president. The party was ballot qualified in Florida for the 2020 election.

==== American Independent Party nomination ====
At its nominating convention on August 15, the American Independent Party (ballot-qualified in California) nominated De La Fuente for president, but nominated Kanye West for president instead of Richardson. The party's convention was a hybrid event held in Sacramento, California, with most delegates voting through virtual attendance. Approximately 20 participants cast votes, with the nomination voting being unanimous (with one abstention).

=== Gloria La Riva, Party for Socialism and Liberation ===
Ballot access by state On ballot Write-in

2020 Party for Socialism and Liberation ticket
Gloria La Riva	Sunil Freeman
for President	for Vice President
Activist and writer from California	Author and activist from the District of Columbia
Additional party nominations:	Liberty Union Party; Peace and Freedom Party

=== Kanye West, Birthday Party ===
Ballot access by state On ballot Write-in

2020 Birthday Party ticket
Kanye West	Michelle Tidball
for President	for Vice President
Rapper, producer and fashion designer from Wyoming	Preacher from Wyoming
Campaign

=== Don Blankenship, Constitution Party ===
Ballot access by state On ballot Write-in

2020 Constitution Party ticket
Don Blankenship	William Mohr
for President	for Vice President
Former CEO of Massey Energy from West Virginia	Chairman of the U.S. Taxpayers Party of Michigan from Michigan
Campaign

Candidates for the Constitution Party nomination
Don Blankenship	Charles Kraut	Don Grundman	Samm Tittle	Daniel Clyde Cummings	J. R. Myers
Former CEO of Massey Energy from West Virginia	Author from Virginia	Chairman of the Constitution Party of California	2012 and 2016 independent presidential candidate from Texas	Physician from Utah	Former Alaska Constitution Party Chairman
Convention; 139.5 votes (1st ballot); 177 votes (2nd ballot); Popular Vote; 639 votes	Convention; 77.8 votes (1st ballot); 86.75 votes (2nd ballot); Popular Vote; 186 votes	Convention; 25.25 votes (1st ballot); 24 votes (2nd ballot); Popular Vote; 256 votes	Convention; 46.35 votes (1st ballot); 21.25 votes (2nd ballot); Popular Vote; 195 votes	Convention; 13.1 votes (1st ballot); Popular Vote; 133 votes	Popular Vote; 116 votes (Note: Myers was only on the ballot in Idaho, and did not participate in the National Convention.)

=== Brock Pierce, independent ===
Ballot access by state On ballot Write-in

Independent
Brock Pierce	Karla Ballard
for President	for Vice President
Director of the Bitcoin Foundation and former actor from Puerto Rico	Entrepreneur from Pennsylvania
Campaign
Additional party nominations and ballot labels:	American Shopping Party; Independence Party of New York; Freedom and Prosperity

=== Brian Carroll, American Solidarity Party ===
Ballot access by state On ballot Write-in

2020 American Solidarity Party ticket
Brian T. Carroll	Amar Patel
for President	for Vice President
Teacher from California	Chairman of the American Solidarity Party from Illinois
Campaign

Other candidates for the American Solidarity Party nomination
Joe Schriner	Joshua Perkins
Plumber and activist from Ohio	Programmer from Texas
Campaign	

=== Jade Simmons, independent ===
Ballot access by state On ballot Write-in

Independent
Jade Simmons	Claudeliah J. Roze
for President	for Vice President
Classical concert pianist from Texas	Defense contractor from Texas
Additional ballot label:	Becoming One Nation

Registered write-in Unregistered write-in

Results by state
State	Votes	Percentage
Arizona	236	0.01%
Connecticut	22	–%
Delaware	28	0.01%
Florida	181	–%
Georgia	162	–%
Idaho	21	–%
Illinois	78	–%
Kansas	48	–%
Kentucky	29	–%
Louisiana	3,654	0.23%
Maryland	131	–%
Michigan	89	–%
Missouri	74	–%
Montana	6	–%
New York	155	–%
New Hampshire	7	–%
North Carolina	119	–%
Ohio	212	–%
Oklahoma	1,626	0.08%
Tennessee	68	–%
Wisconsin	36	–%
Utah	186	–%
West Virginia	6	–%
Vermont	1	–%
6 states	0	–%
7 states	0	0%
Total:	7,175	–%
Source: The Green Papers

=== Alyson Kennedy, Socialist Workers Party ===
Ballot access by state On ballot Write-in

2020 Socialist Workers Party ticket
Alyson Kennedy	Malcolm Jarrett
for President	for Vice President
Mineworker and 2016 nominee from Texas	Cook from Pennsylvania

Unregistered write-in

Results by state
State	Votes	Percentage
Colorado	354	0.01%
Minnesota	643	0.02%
Louisiana	536	0.02%
Tennessee	2,576	0.08%
Vermont	195	0.05%
Washington	2,487	0.06%
8 states	0	0%
Total:	6,791	–%
Source: The Green Papers

=== Bill Hammons, Unity Party ===
Ballot access by state On ballot Write-in

2020 Unity Party ticket
Bill Hammons	Eric Bodenstab
for President	for Vice President
Founder of the Unity Party from Texas	Chairman of the Colorado Unity Party from Colorado
Campaign

Unregistered write-in

Results by state
State	Votes	Percentage
Colorado	2,730	0.08%
Louisiana	662	0.03%
New Jersey	3,255	0.07%
Vermont	1	–%
6 states	0	0%
Total:	6,647	–%
Source: The Green Papers

=== Jerome Segal, Bread and Roses ===
Ballot access by state On ballot Write-in

2020 Bread and Roses ticket
Jerome Segal	John de Graaf
for President	for Vice President
Philosopher from Maryland	Documentary filmmaker and author from Washington
Campaign

Unregistered write-in

Results by state
State	Votes	Percentage
Maryland	5,884	0.19%
Vermont	65	0.02%
8 states	0	0%
Total:	5,949	–%
Source: The Green Papers

=== Dario Hunter, Progressive Party ===
Ballot access by state On ballot Write-in

Dario Hunter 2020 Progressive Party ticket
Dario Hunter	Dawn Neptune Adams
for President	for Vice President
Youngstown Board of Education member (2016–2020) and 2020 Green candidate for President from Ohio	Activist from Maine
Additional party nominations:	Oregon Progressive Party

Registered write-in Unregistered write-in

Results by state
State	Votes	Percentage
Colorado	379	0.01%
Oregon	4,988	0.21%
Kansas	1	–%
Minnesota	1	–%
Ohio	27	–%
Washington	8	0%
2 states	0	–%
8 states	0	0%
Total:	5,404	–%
Source: The Green Papers

=== Phil Collins, Prohibition Party ===
Ballot access by state On ballot Write-in

2020 Prohibition Party ticket
Phil Collins	Billy Joe Parker
for President	for Vice President
Former Libertyville Township Trustee from Nevada	Former Marine from Georgia
Campaign

Previous nominees of the Prohibition Party
First nominees
Bill Bayes	C. L. Gammon
for President	for Vice President
2016 Vice Presidential nominee from Mississippi	Historian from Tennessee
Bayes withdrew on March 21, 2019
Second nominees
C. L. Gammon	Phil Collins
for President	for Vice President
Historian from Tennessee	Former Libertyville Township Trustee from Nevada
Gammon withdrew on August 2, 2019

Registered write-in Unregistered write-in

Results by state
State	Votes	Percentage
Arkansas	2,812	0.23%
Colorado	568	0.02%
Illinois	3	–%
Maryland	10	–%
Mississippi	1,317	0.10%
New York	9	–%
Vermont	137	0.04%
Washington	0	0%
8 states	0	0%
Total:	4,856	–%
Source: The Green Papers

=== Jesse Ventura, Green Party of Alaska ===
Ballot access by state On ballot Write-in

2020 Green Party of Alaska ticket
Jesse Ventura	Cynthia McKinney
for President	for Vice President
Governor of Minnesota (1999–2003)	U.S. Representative from Georgia (1993–2003)

Registered write-in Unregistered write-in

Results by state
State	Votes	Percentage
Alaska	2,673	0.74%
California	611	–%
Rhode Island	11	–%
Vermont	6	–%
7 states	0	0%
Total:	3,036	–%
Source: The Green Papers

=== Mark Charles, independent ===
Ballot access by state On ballot Write-in

Independent (Note: Adrian Wallace replaced original vice-presidential nominee Sedinam Moyowasifza-Curry, who was removed from the campaign for unknown reasons.)
Mark Charles	Adrian Wallace
for President	for Vice President
Activist from the District of Columbia	Community organizer and activist from Kentucky

Registered write-in Unregistered write-in

Results by state
State	Votes	Percentage
California	559	–%
Colorado	2,011	0.06%
Connecticut	11	–%
Delaware	8	–%
Georgia	65	–%
Illinois	75	–%
Kansas	29	–%
Kentucky	43	–%
Maryland	30	–%
Minnesota	112	–%
Montana	23	–%
Vermont	7	–%
Wisconsin	52	–%
West Virginia	11	–%
4 states	0	0%
8 states	0	0%
Total:	3,036	–%
Source: The Green Papers

=== Joe McHugh, independent ===
Ballot access by state On ballot Write-in

Independent
Joe McHugh	Elizabeth Storm
for President	for Vice President
Marine veteran and entrepreneur from Michigan	Attorney from Michigan

Registered write-in Unregistered write-in

State	Votes	Percentage
UT	2,229	0.15%
CO	614	0.02%
3 states	0	0%
9 states	0	0%
Source: The Green Papers 1 2

== Other votes ==
A few states counted write-in votes for anyone, including people who did not declare themselves candidates and even non-human entities. In Vermont, write-in preferences included well-regarded politicians (including misspellings), celebrities, fictional characters, and deities.

Candidates who received under 2,000 votes and alternative ballot options
Scattered write-ins	157,794		
Blank / None of the above	132,870		
Candidate	Votes	States reported from	
Candidate	Votes	On ballot	Write-in
Samm Tittle	1,806	1 (NM)	3 (AK, NH, VA)
Tom Hoefling	1,331	1 (LA)	17 states
Brooke Paige	1,175	1 (VT)	
Bernie Sanders	1,015		3 (NH, RI, VT)
Christopher LaFontaine	856	1 (VT)	
Kyle Kopitke	815	2 (CO, VT)	
Ricki Sue King	546	1 (IA)	
Princess Jacob-Fambro	505	1 (CO)	7 states
Blake Huber	409	2 (CO, VT)	
Joseph Tanniru	350	1 (CO)	4 states
Mitt Romney	336		3 (NH, RI, VT)
Tulsi Gabbard	282		3 (NH, RI, VT)
Todd Cella	223		10 states
Richard Duncan	213	1 (VT)	
Kasey J. Wells	213		28 states
Jordan Scott	175	1 (CO)	
Andrew Yang	148		3 (NH, RI, VT)
John Kasich	143		3 (NH, RI, VT)
Gary Swing	141	1 (VT)	
Keith McCormic	126	1 (VT)	
Mike Pence	121		3 (NH, RI, VT)
Source: The Green Papers 1 2 3

In Nevada, the ballots included the option "None of These Candidates", which received 14,079 votes.

== Debates ==
==== Primaries ====
Early on March 4, 2020, the Free & Equal Elections Foundation held a debate at the Hilton Chicago Hotel. Various third-party candidates, as well as minor candidates affiliated with the Democratic and Republican parties attended.

2020 Free & Equal debates
No.	Date & Time	Location	Moderators	Invited participants								
P Participant.				Democratic	Libertarian			Green	Constitution	American Solidarity	Life and Liberty	Transhumanist
P Participant.				Businessman Mark Stewart of Connecticut	Activist Dan Berhman of Texas	Carpenter Erik Gerhardt of Pennsylvania	LNC Vice Chair Arvin Vohra of Maryland	Activist Sedinam Moyowasifza-Curry of California	Financial Advisor Charles Kraut of Virginia	Educator Brian Carroll of California	Activist J.R. Myers of Alaska	Activist Ben Zion of Arizona
1a	March 4, 2020; 2:00 pm CST	Chicago, Illinois	Christina Tobin	P	P	P	P	P	P	P	P	P
P Participant.				Republican	Democratic	Libertarian				Green / Socialist	PSL	Independent
P Participant.				Futurist Zoltan Istvan of California	Attorney Mosie Boyd of Arkansas	Lieutenant Ken Armstrong of Hawaii	Lecturer Jo Jorgensen of South Carolina	Corporal Adam Kokesh of Indiana	Activist Vermin Supreme of Massachusetts	Tradesman Howie Hawkins of New York	Activist Gloria La Riva of California	Activist Mark Charles of the District of Columbia
1b	March 4, 2020; 6:30 pm CST	Chicago, Illinois	Christina Tobin	P	P	P	P	P	P	P	P	P

==== General election ====
Two debates were held prior to the general election. The first was on October 8, 2020, in Denver, Colorado, with only candidates on the ballot in at least eight states eligible to participate. A second debate open to the same group of candidates occurred on October 24, 2020, in Cheyenne, Wyoming.

2020 Free & Equal debates
No.	Date & Time	Location	Moderators	Invited participants									
P Participant. A Absent Invitee.				Republican	Democratic	Libertarian	Green / Socialist	PSL	Alliance / Reform	Constitution	American Solidarity	Independent	
P Participant. A Absent Invitee.				President Donald Trump of Florida	Former Vice President Joe Biden of Delaware	Lecturer Jo Jorgensen of South Carolina	Tradesman Howie Hawkins of New York	Activist Gloria La Riva of California	Businessman Rocky De La Fuente of California	Businessman Don Blankenship of West Virginia	Educator Brian Carroll of California	Entrepreneur Brock Pierce of Puerto Rico	Producer Kanye West of Wyoming
2	October 8, 2020; 6:00 pm MDT	Denver, Colorado	Christina Tobin	A	A	A	P	P	A	P	P	P	A
3	October 24, 2020; 6:00 pm MDT	Cheyenne, Wyoming	Christina Tobin	A	A	A	P	P	A	A	P	P	A

== Withdrawn candidates ==
- Max Abramson, New Hampshire State Representative from the 20th Rockingham district (ran for and lost the Veterans Party of America nomination) (ran for election to the New Hampshire House of Representatives)
- Darcy Richardson, author, historian and political activist (Reform Party) (ran for Vice-President)

== Declined ==
Individuals in this section were the subject of speculation that they might run for president as an independent or minor party candidate for the 2020 election but later said that they would not.

- Michael Bloomberg, former Mayor of New York (2002–2013), CEO of Bloomberg (ran for Democratic nomination) (endorsed Biden)
- Mark Cuban, businessman and investor from Texas (endorsed Biden)
- Tulsi Gabbard, U.S. Representative from HI-02 (2013–2021) (ran for Democratic nomination) (endorsed Biden)
- John Kasich, former Governor of Ohio (2011–2019) (endorsed Biden)
- Howard Schultz, former CEO of Starbucks from Washington (endorsed Biden)
- Ed Stack, CEO of Dick's Sporting Goods
- Jesse Ventura, former Governor of Minnesota (1999–2003), former mayor of Brooklyn Park (1991–1995) (considered running for the Green Party nomination; along with Cynthia McKinney, replaced Howie Hawkins and Angela Walker as the Green Party candidates on the ballot in Alaska)
- Marianne Williamson, spiritual/self-help author (ran for Democratic nomination) (endorsed Sanders, then Biden)
- Andrew Yang, entrepreneur, tech executive (ran for Democratic nomination) (endorsed Biden)

== See also ==
- 2020 Republican Party presidential candidates
- 2020 Democratic Party presidential candidates
- Timeline of the 2020 United States presidential election
- 2020 United States presidential election
