= 2020 United States presidential election in Alaska =

- November 3, 2020
- Turnout: 60.67% (▼0.1 pp)

Nominee	Donald Trump	Joe Biden
Party	Republican	Democratic
Home state	Florida	Delaware
Running mate	Mike Pence	Kamala Harris
Electoral vote	3	0
Popular vote	189,951	153,778
Percentage	52.83%	42.77%

Trump
40–50%
50–60%
60–70%
70–80%
80–90%
90–100%
Biden
40–50%
50–60%
60–70%
70–80%
80–90%
90–100%
Tie/No Votes
President before election
Donald Trump
Republican
Elected President
Joe Biden
Democratic

The 2020 United States presidential election in Alaska took place on Tuesday, November 3, 2020, as part of the 2020 United States presidential election in which all 50 states and the District of Columbia participated. Alaska voters chose three electors to represent them in the Electoral College via a popular vote pitting incumbent Republican President Donald Trump and his running mate, incumbent Vice President Mike Pence, against Democratic challenger and former Vice President Joe Biden and his running mate, United States Senator Kamala Harris of California. The Libertarian, Green (Note: The national Green Party nominated Howie Hawkins for President with Angela Nicole Walker as his running mate, but the Alaska state party chose Ventura and McKinney.), Constitution, and Alliance Party nominees were also on the ballot, as was an independent candidate.

Prior to the election, 13 of 14 news organizations predicted that Alaska would be a state that Trump would win, or otherwise a red state. Since it was admitted into the Union in 1959, Alaska has voted for the Republican nominee in every single election except 1964 in Lyndon B. Johnson's nationwide landslide, when he carried it with 65.91% of the vote. However, some analysts believed Alaska could be competitive based on polling.

Despite not being a swing state, Alaska was one of the last states to be called; the state did not start counting absentee ballots or early votes that were cast after October 29 until November 10. Mail-in votes only had to be received by November 13 for them to be counted, and counting had to be completed by November 18. As a result, Alaska was called for Trump on November 11. He won the state by 10.06%, the closest margin in the state since 1992. Biden received the highest percentage of the vote for a Democrat in the state since 1964. It was also the second time a Democrat won over 40% of the vote in the state since 1968, the first being Barack Obama in 2012.

Alaska shifted 4.67% to the Democratic nominee compared to the 2016 election. The state ultimately weighed in as 14.51 percentage points more Republican than the national average in 2020. Biden was the first Democratic presidential candidate to win Anchorage since Lyndon B. Johnson in 1964, and the first Democrat to receive a majority in Haines Borough since 1964.

== Primary elections ==
=== Canceled Republican primary ===
On September 21, 2019, the Alaska Republican Party became one of several state Republican parties to officially cancel their respective primaries and caucuses. The party argued that a primary would be useless with an incumbent Republican president.

Of the 29 total delegates, 3 is allocated to the at-large congressional district, 10 to at-large delegates, and another 3 are allocated to pledged party leaders and elected officials (PLEO delegates). 13 bonus delegates were allocated.

The state party still formally conducted the higher meetings in their walking subcaucus-type delegate selection system. The legislative district conventions were held on the four consecutive Saturdays from February 8 to 29 to select delegates to the Alaska State Republican Convention. At the Alaska State Republican Convention, which took place from April 2 to April 4, 2020, the state party formally bound all 29 of its national pledged delegates to Trump.

The 26 pledged delegates Alaska sent to the national convention were joined by 3 pledged PLEO delegates, consisting of the National Committeeman, National Committeewoman, and chairman of the Alaska Republican Party.

=== Democratic primary ===
The Alaska Democratic primary was originally scheduled for April 4, 2020. On March 23, due to concerns over the COVID-19 pandemic, the Alaska Democratic Party canceled in-person voting, but extended mail-in voting to April 10.

2020 Alaska Democratic presidential primary final results
Candidate	Votes	%	Delegates
Joe Biden	10,834	54.83	8
Bernie Sanders (withdrawn)	8,755	44.31	7
Inactive votes (Note: Votes which had all its 5 ranked vote-choices allocated towards eliminated candidates who did not reach the threshold of 15%.)	170	0.86	
Total	19,759	100%	15

=== Libertarian nominee ===
No contest was held for the Libertarian Party's nomination in the state of Alaska. At the 2020 Libertarian National Convention, the Alaskan delegates cast their votes for Georgia politician John Monds, but on the third and fourth ballots voted for Jo Jorgensen, psychology senior lecturer at Clemson University. Jorgensen would become the party's nominee after being elected on the fourth ballot, her running mate being entrepreneur and podcaster Spike Cohen.

== General election ==
=== Issues ===
Several of Trump's environmental policies involved loosening restrictions on energy, hunting, and mining in Alaska: he instructed the Department of Agriculture to exempt Tongass National Forest from logging restrictions; supported the construction of Pebble Mine, an unpopular gold and copper mine in Bristol Bay (though the permit was ultimately denied); rolled back limits on hunters in federal land in Alaska; and opened the Arctic National Wildlife Refuge to drilling. While these policies expanded their respective industries, they were met with opposition among environmental groups and the Gwich'in, whose sacred land is partly within the refuge. Biden pledged to reverse several of Trump's climate policies and address the climate crisis, and he enacted a temporary moratorium on gas and oil leasing in the ANWR after being inaugurated on January 20, 2021.

Trump's environmental and gun policy also included reviving hunting techniques in Alaska, an action condemned by several animal rights groups.

=== Final predictions ===
Source	Ranking
The Cook Political Report	Likely R
Inside Elections	Lean R
Sabato's Crystal Ball	Likely R
Politico	Lean R
RCP	Likely R
Niskanen	Tossup
CNN	Solid R
The Economist	Likely R
CBS News (Note: CBS News' presidential election ratings uniquely do not contain a category for Safe/Solid races.)	Likely R
270towin	Likely R
ABC News	Lean R
NPR (Note: NPR's presidential election ratings uniquely do not contain a category for Safe/Solid races.)	Lean R
NBC News	Likely R
538	Likely R

=== Polling ===
View source data.

Aggregate polls

Source of poll aggregation	Dates administered	Dates updated	Joe Biden Democratic	Donald Trump Republican	Other/ Undecided (Note: Calculated by taking the difference of 100% and all other candidates combined.)	Margin
270 to Win	October 6 – November 2, 2020	November 3, 2020	43.8%	49.4%	6.8%	Trump +5.6
FiveThirtyEight	until November 2, 2020	November 3, 2020	43.6%	51.2%	5.2%	Trump +7.7
Average			43.7%	50.3%	6.0%	Trump +6.7

Polls

Poll source	Date(s) administered	Sample size (Note: Key: A – all adults RV – registered voters LV – likely voters V – unclear)	Margin of error	Donald Trump Republican	Joe Biden Democratic	Jo Jorgensen Libertarian	Other	Undecided
SurveyMonkey/Axios	Oct 20 – Nov 2, 2020	634 (LV)	± 5%	54% (Note: Overlapping sample with the previous SurveyMonkey/Axios poll, but more information available regarding sample size)	45%	–	–	–
Gravis Marketing	Oct 26–28, 2020	770 (LV)	± 3.5%	52%	43%	–	–	5%
SurveyMonkey/Axios	Oct 1–28, 2020	1,147 (LV)	–	54%	44%	–	–	–
Public Policy Polling/Protect Our Care (Note: Poll sponsored by Protect Our Care, a pro-Affordable Care Act organization)	Oct 19–20, 2020	800 (V)	± 3.5%	50%	45%	-	–	5%
Siena College/NYT Upshot	Oct 9–14, 2020	423 (LV)	± 5.7%	45%	39%	8%	2% (Note: "Someone else" and would not vote with 1%)	6% (Note: Includes "Refused")
Patinkin Research Strategies	Sep 30 – Oct 4, 2020	600 (LV)	± 4%	49%	46%	–	3% (Note: "Someone else" with 3%)	2%
Alaska Survey Research	Sep 26 – Oct 4, 2020	696 (LV)	–	50%	46%	-	-	4%
SurveyMonkey/Axios	Sep 1–30, 2020	563 (LV)	–	53%	45%	-	-	2%
Harstad Strategic Research/Independent Alaska (Note: The Independent Alaska PAC supported Al Gross's campaign for the US Senate race in Alaska prior to this poll's sampling period)	Sep 20–23, 2020	602 (LV)	± 4%	47%	46%	-	-	–
SurveyMonkey/Axios	Aug 1–31, 2020	472 (LV)	–	57%	42%	-	-	1%
SurveyMonkey/Axios	Jul 1–31, 2020	412 (LV)	–	55%	43%	-	-	2%
Public Policy Polling (D) (Note: AFSCME endorsed Biden prior to this poll's sampling period)	Jul 23–24, 2020	885 (V)	–	50%	44%	-	-	6%
Public Policy Polling (Note: Poll's funding crowdsourced by Election Twitter.)	Jul 7–8, 2020	1,081 (RV)	± 3.0%	48%	45%	-	-	6%
Alaska Survey Research	Jun 23 – Jul 7, 2020	663 (LV)	± 3.9%	49%	48%	-	-	4%
SurveyMonkey/Axios	Jun 8–30, 2020	161 (LV)	–	52%	46%	-	-	2%
Zogby Interactive/JZ Analytics	Jul 22 – Aug 9, 2019	321 (LV)	± 5.5%	45%	40%	-	-	15%

Former candidates

Donald Trump vs. Pete Buttigieg

Poll source	Date(s) administered	Sample size	Margin of error	Donald Trump (R)	Pete Buttigieg (D)	Undecided
Zogby Interactive/JZ Analytics	Jul 22 – Aug 9, 2019	321 (LV)	± 5.5%	45%	31%	24%

Donald Trump vs. Kamala Harris

Poll source	Date(s) administered	Sample size	Margin of error	Donald Trump (R)	Kamala Harris (D)	Undecided
Zogby Interactive/JZ Analytics	Jul 22 – Aug 9, 2019	321 (LV)	± 5.5%	48%	30%	23%

Donald Trump vs. Bernie Sanders

Poll source	Date(s) administered	Sample size	Margin of error	Donald Trump (R)	Bernie Sanders (D)	Undecided
Zogby Interactive/JZ Analytics	Jul 22 – Aug 9, 2019	321 (LV)	± 5.5%	45%	38%	17%

Donald Trump vs. Elizabeth Warren

Poll source	Date(s) administered	Sample size	Margin of error	Donald Trump (R)	Elizabeth Warren (D)	Undecided
Zogby Interactive/JZ Analytics	Jul 22 – Aug 9, 2019	321 (LV)	± 5.5%	48%	32%	20%

=== Fundraising ===
According to the Federal Election Commission, in 2019 and 2020, of the candidates who were on the ballot, Donald Trump and his interest groups raised $1,487,277.13, Joe Biden raised $1,321,242.60, and Jo Jorgensen raised $7,420.85 from Alaska-based contributors. Don Blankenship, Brock Pierce, and Rocky De La Fuente, all of which were on the ballot, did not raise any money from the state.

=== Candidate ballot access ===
- Donald Trump / Mike Pence, Republican
- Joe Biden / Kamala Harris, Democratic
- Jo Jorgensen / Spike Cohen, Libertarian
- Jesse Ventura / Cynthia McKinney, Green
- Don Blankenship / William Mohr, Constitution
- Brock Pierce / Karla Ballard, Independent
- Rocky De La Fuente / Darcy Richardson, Alliance

In addition, write-in candidates were required to file a Declaration of Intent with the Alaska Division of Elections at least five days before the election. They were also obligated to file a financial disclosure statement. Write-in votes were not counted individually. The following candidates were given write-in access:

- Dennis Andrew Ball / Richard A. Sanders, American Party of America – American National Committee
- Barbara Ruth Bellar / Kendra Bryant, Republican
- President R19 Boddie / Eric C. Stoneham, Independent
- David C. Byrne / Tony N. Reed, C.C.U.S.A.
- Brian T. Carroll / Amar Patel, American Solidarity
- Todd Cella / Timothy Bryan "Tim" Cella, Independent
- Mark Robert Charles / Adrian D. Wallace, Independent
- Ryan Stephen Ehrenreich / Veronica Ehrenreich, Independent
- Howard "Howie" Gresham Hawkins / Angela Nicola Walker, Socialist Party USA
- Thomas "Tom" Hoefling / Andy Prior, Independent
- Shawn W. Howard / Alyssa C. Howard, Independent
- Dario David Hunter / Dawn Neptune Adams, Progressive
- Joseph W. "Joe" McHugh / Elizabeth "Liz" Storm, Independent
- Albert L. Raley / Darlene Raley, Republican
- Deborah Ann "Debbie" Rouse / Sheila Maria Cannon, Independent
- Jade Simmons / Claudeliah J. "CJ" Roze, Independent
- Mary Ruth Caro Simmons / Sherrie Dow, Independent
- Ajay Sood / Richard Mende, Independent
- Sheila "Samm" Tittle / John Wagner, Independent
- Kasey J. Wells / Rachel M. Wells, Independent
- Kanye West / Michelle Tidball, Independent
- Demetra Jefferson Wysinger / Cedric D. Jefferson, WXYZ New Day

=== Electoral slates ===
The voters of Alaska cast their ballots for electors, or representatives to the Electoral College, rather than directly for the President and Vice President. Alaska is allocated 3 electors because it has 1 congressional district and 2 senators. All candidates who appear on the ballot or qualify to receive write-in votes must submit a list of 3 electors who pledge to vote for their candidate and their running mate. Whoever wins the most votes in the state is awarded all 3 electoral votes. Their chosen electors then vote for president and vice president. Although electors are pledged to their candidate and running mate, they are not obligated to vote for them. An elector who votes for someone other than their candidate is known as a faithless elector. In the state of Alaska, a faithless elector's vote is counted and not penalized.

The electors of each state and the District of Columbia met on December 14, 2020, to cast their votes for president and vice president. All 3 pledged electors from Alaska cast their votes for President Donald Trump and Vice President Mike Pence. The Electoral College itself never meets as one body. Instead, the electors from each state and the District of Columbia meet in their respective state capitals (the District of Columbia electors meet within the District). The electoral vote was tabulated and certified by Congress in a joint session on January 6, 2021, per the Electoral Count Act.

These electors were nominated by each party in order to vote in the Electoral College should their candidate win the state:

Donald Trump and Mike Pence Republican Party	Joe Biden and Kamala Harris Democratic Party	Jo Jorgensen and Spike Cohen Libertarian Party	Jesse Ventura and Cynthia McKinney Green Party	Don Blankenship and William Mohr Constitution Party	Brock Pierce and Karla Ballard Independent	Rocky De La Fuente and Darcy Richardson Alliance
John Binkley; Judy Eledge; Randy Ruedrich	Paul Kelly; Frances Degnan; Cindy Spanyers	none listed	Robert Shields; Lenin Lau; Josh Hadley	Samuel Smith; Rebecca Anderson; William Topel	Arenz Thigpen Jr. Roderick Butler; John Ray	Ross Johnston; Marie Motschman; Anne Begle-Shedlock

=== Delay in results ===
As expected, there was a nationwide delay in reporting election results, due to the extreme influx of absentee and mail-in ballots as a public health measure in response to the COVID-19 pandemic. In Alaska, these delays were especially severe. Alaska mailed absentee ballot applications to every voter aged 65 and over. Mail-in ballots only needed to be postmarked by Election Day and received by November 13 (November 18 for overseas voters), further delaying the count. Only early votes cast before October 29 and Election Day votes would be released on Election Night and the state could not even begin the counting of absentee ballots nor the remaining early votes until November 10. Counting was expected to be complete by November 18. By November 4, the state still had at least 122,233 absentee ballots to count. Alaska and New York are the only two states to begin counting absentee ballots after Election Day. Gail Felunumiai, Alaska's Director of Elections, attributed the delay to the need to verify that voters who voted by mail and also at their polling places did not have their ballots counted twice.

The delay in counting left many races undecided for weeks. The extreme rural nature of the state only worsened the delay: with many local communities being accessible only by boat or plane, seven communities had to vote entirely by absentee ballots in the primary due to a last-minute shortage of election workers. The Associated Press called the race for Trump on November 11 at 12:16 PM EST (8:16 AM AKST), 4 days after President-elect Biden won the national election.

== Results ==
2020 United States presidential election in Alaska
Party	Candidate	Votes	%	±%
Republican	Donald Trump Mike Pence	189,951	52.83%	+1.55%
Democratic	Joe Biden Kamala Harris	153,778	42.77%	+6.23%
Libertarian	Jo Jorgensen Spike Cohen	8,897	2.47%	−3.41%
Green	Jesse Ventura Cynthia McKinney	2,673	0.74%	−1.06%
Constitution	Don Blankenship William Mohr	1,127	0.31%	−0.90%
Independent	Brock Pierce Karla Ballard	825	0.23%	N/A
Alliance	Rocky De La Fuente Darcy Richardson	318	0.09%	N/A
Write-in		1,961	0.55%	N/A
Total votes		359,530	100.00%	+6.67%

=== By State House district ===
Unlike every other U.S. state, Alaska is not divided into counties or parishes. Rather, it is administratively divided into 20 boroughs: 19 organized and 1 unorganized, which act as county-equivalents. The Unorganized Borough lacks a borough government structure and itself is divided into eleven census areas. Contrary to election results in most states, official results by borough are not available – rather, they are estimates based on precinct-level data. However, the Alaska Division of Elections does release official results by State House district, which are listed in the table below. Trump won 21 districts to Biden's 19. Biden also won overseas ballots. The 5th, 23rd, 25th, 27th, 28th, and 35th districts swung from voting for Donald Trump in 2016 to Joe Biden in 2020.

State House District	Donald Trump Republican		Joe Biden Democratic		Jo Jorgensen Libertarian		Jesse Ventura Green		Don Blankenship Constitution		Brock Pierce Independent		Rocky De La Fuente Alliance		Write-in		Margin		Total votes	Registered voters	Voter turnout
State House District	Votes	%	Votes	%	Votes	%	Votes	%	Votes	%	Votes	%	Votes	%	Votes	%	Votes	%	Total votes	Registered voters	Voter turnout
1 - Fairbanks	3,511	47.43%	3,477	46.97%	216	2.92%	50	0.68%	34	0.46%	24	0.32%	2	0.03%	89	1.20%	34	0.46%	7,403	13,926	53.16%
2 - Fort Wainwright	3,674	59.54%	2,104	34.09%	287	4.65%	30	0.49%	18	0.29%	14	0.23%	9	0.15%	35	0.57%	1,570	25.45%	6,171	11,997	51.44%
3 - North Pole	6,076	71.89%	1,903	22.52%	316	3.74%	42	0.50%	27	0.32%	13	0.15%	8	0.09%	67	0.79%	4,173	49.37%	8,452	14,878	56.81%
4 - Goldstream	4,690	44.10%	5,345	50.25%	323	3.04%	93	0.87%	27	0.25%	29	0.27%	4	0.04%	125	1.18%	-655	-6.15%	10,636	15,274	69.63%
5 - West Fairbanks	4,077	46.65%	4,204	48.11%	259	2.96%	68	0.78%	21	0.24%	17	0.19%	8	0.09%	85	0.97%	-127	-1.46%	8,739	13,958	62.61%
6 - Rural Interior	5,770	60.36%	3,272	34.23%	266	2.78%	83	0.87%	33	0.35%	31	0.32%	5	0.05%	99	1.04%	2,498	26.13%	9,559	15,444	61.89%
7 - Wasilla	7,027	72.35%	2,215	22.80%	272	2.80%	54	0.56%	36	0.37%	13	0.13%	5	0.05%	91	0.94%	4,812	49.55%	9,713	16,692	58.19%
8 - Knik	7,618	76.28%	1,953	19.56%	241	2.41%	48	0.48%	28	0.28%	18	0.18%	6	0.06%	75	0.75%	5,665	56.72%	9,987	17,531	56.97%
9 - Sutton-Valdez-Delta	7,787	70.17%	2,769	24.95%	301	2.71%	77	0.69%	39	0.35%	16	0.14%	4	0.04%	105	0.95%	5,018	45.22%	11,098	16,917	65.60%
10 - Houston	8,081	71.64%	2,727	24.18%	286	2.54%	64	0.57%	22	0.20%	19	0.17%	6	0.05%	75	0.66%	5,354	47.46%	11,280	17,577	64.17%
11 - Palmer	7,096	66.14%	3,130	29.17%	269	2.51%	88	0.82%	22	0.21%	17	0.16%	6	0.06%	101	0.94%	3,966	36.97%	10,729	16,491	65.06%
12 - Butte	7,893	69.66%	2,957	26.10%	288	2.54%	54	0.48%	28	0.25%	15	0.13%	3	0.03%	92	0.81%	4,936	43.56%	11,330	16,546	68.48%
13 - Chugiak	4,652	59.69%	2,666	34.21%	308	3.95%	40	0.51%	16	0.21%	25	0.32%	6	0.08%	80	1.03%	1,986	25.48%	7,793	13,888	56.11%
14 - Eagle River	6,714	57.94%	4,261	36.77%	356	3.07%	50	0.43%	46	0.40%	10	0.09%	6	0.05%	145	1.25%	2,453	21.17%	11,588	16,726	69.28%
15 - JBER	2,671	47.48%	2,622	46.61%	197	3.50%	36	0.64%	10	0.18%	13	0.23%	10	0.18%	67	1.19%	49	0.87%	5,626	12,607	44.63%
16 - Nunaka Valley	3,516	42.84%	4,274	52.08%	210	2.56%	64	0.78%	27	0.33%	15	0.18%	12	0.15%	89	1.08%	-758	-9.24%	8,207	15,067	54.47%
17 - UMed	2,810	38.42%	4,136	56.56%	184	2.52%	64	0.88%	18	0.25%	18	0.25%	9	0.12%	74	1.01%	-1,326	-18.14%	7,313	13,307	54.96%
18 - West Anchorage	2,760	35.33%	4,681	59.92%	157	2.01%	79	1.01%	24	0.31%	15	0.19%	4	0.05%	92	1.18%	-1,921	-24.59%	7,812	14,183	55.08%
19 - Mountain View	1,975	36.69%	3,118	57.92%	110	2.04%	52	0.97%	22	0.41%	11	0.20%	13	0.24%	82	1.52%	-1,143	-21.23%	5,383	12,328	43.66%
20 - Downtown Anchorage	2,383	31.35%	4,881	64.21%	153	2.01%	53	0.70%	8	0.11%	15	0.20%	4	0.05%	105	1.38%	-2,498	-32.86%	7,602	14,086	53.97%
21 - Turnagain-Sand Lake	3,690	38.71%	5,414	56.79%	203	2.13%	70	0.73%	29	0.30%	19	0.20%	4	0.04%	104	1.09%	-1,724	-18.08%	9,533	14,633	65.15%
22 - Jewel Lake	4,684	48.55%	4,553	47.20%	200	2.07%	46	0.48%	16	0.17%	18	0.19%	3	0.03%	127	1.32%	131	1.35%	9,647	15,077	63.98%
23 - Campbell Creek	3,655	46.64%	3,810	48.62%	170	2.17%	53	0.68%	22	0.28%	16	0.20%	13	0.17%	98	1.25%	-155	-1.98%	7,837	14,325	54.71%
24 - East Anchorage	5,378	50.98%	4,736	44.89%	222	2.10%	46	0.44%	15	0.14%	24	0.23%	7	0.07%	122	1.16%	642	6.09%	10,550	15,078	69.97%
25 - Abbott	4,407	46.88%	4,600	48.94%	201	2.14%	67	0.71%	21	0.22%	14	0.15%	15	0.16%	75	0.80%	-193	-2.06%	9,400	15,175	61.94%
26 - O'Malley-Huffman	5,243	51.26%	4,558	44.56%	207	2.02%	55	0.54%	23	0.22%	23	0.22%	2	0.02%	118	1.15%	685	6.70%	10,229	15,591	65.61%
27 - Hillside	4,324	45.13%	4,844	50.55%	228	2.38%	59	0.62%	21	0.22%	24	0.25%	6	0.06%	76	0.79%	-520	-5.42%	9,582	15,390	62.26%
28 - Girdwood	6,162	47.76%	6,264	48.55%	219	1.70%	69	0.53%	16	0.12%	16	0.12%	3	0.02%	153	1.19%	-102	-0.79%	12,902	16,743	77.06%
29 - Nikiski-Seward	7,464	68.96%	2,985	27.58%	190	1.76%	69	0.64%	26	0.24%	10	0.09%	3	0.03%	76	0.70%	4,479	41.38%	10,823	16,296	66.42%
30 - Kenai	7,180	69.97%	2,638	25.71%	270	2.63%	42	0.41%	26	0.25%	17	0.17%	3	0.03%	86	0.84%	4,542	44.26%	10,262	16,782	61.15%
31 - Homer	6,971	55.56%	5,037	40.15%	250	1.99%	100	0.80%	27	0.22%	18	0.14%	7	0.06%	136	1.08%	1,934	15.41%	12,546	18,132	69.19%
32 - Kodiak	4,440	52.89%	3,506	41.76%	238	2.84%	105	1.25%	21	0.25%	21	0.25%	4	0.05%	60	0.71%	934	11.13%	8,395	13,986	60.02%
33 - Juneau	3,059	27.65%	7,535	68.11%	197	1.78%	103	0.93%	27	0.24%	25	0.23%	9	0.08%	108	0.98%	-4,476	-40.46%	11,063	16,306	67.85%
34 - Mendenhall	4,543	41.85%	5,763	53.09%	279	2.57%	68	0.63%	36	0.33%	34	0.31%	6	0.06%	127	1.17%	-1,220	-11.24%	10,856	16,034	67.71%
35 - Sitka-Petersburg	4,769	46.71%	5,011	49.08%	170	1.67%	95	0.93%	35	0.34%	16	0.16%	6	0.06%	107	1.05%	-242	-2.37%	10,209	15,766	64.75%
36 - Ketchikan	5,114	54.47%	3,796	40.43%	245	2.61%	79	0.84%	30	0.32%	20	0.21%	8	0.09%	97	1.03%	1,318	14.04%	9,389	15,375	61.07%
37 - Bristol Bay-Aleutians	2,358	45.09%	2,560	48.95%	86	1.64%	56	1.07%	51	0.98%	17	0.33%	14	0.27%	88	1.68%	-202	-3.86%	5,230	10,447	50.06%
38 - Bethel	1,737	32.17%	3,202	59.30%	105	1.94%	112	2.07%	52	0.96%	61	1.13%	30	0.56%	101	1.87%	-1,465	-27.13%	5,400	12,145	44.46%
39 - Nome	1,939	32.26%	3,580	59.56%	123	2.05%	104	1.73%	80	1.33%	45	0.75%	20	0.33%	120	2.00%	-1,641	-27.30%	6,011	12,144	49.50%
40 - Kotzebue-Utqiagvik	1,994	42.63%	2,318	49.56%	94	2.01%	86	1.84%	47	1.00%	39	0.83%	25	0.53%	74	1.58%	-324	-6.93%	4,677	10,118	46.22%
Overseas ballots	59	13.47%	373	85.16%	1	0.23%	0	0.00%	0	0.00%	0	0.00%	0	0.00%	5	1.14%	-314	-71.69%	438	681	64.32%
Total	189,951	52.83%	153,778	42.77%	8,897	2.47%	2,673	0.74%	1,127	0.31%	825	0.23%	318	0.09%	3,831 (Note: For an unknown reason, the number of write-in votes differs between the official statewide results and the official State House district-level results. The former counts 1,961 and the latter 3,831. Results for all other candidates are identical between the two sources.)	1.06%	36,173	10.06%	361,400	595,647	60.67%

Boroughs and census areas that flipped from Republican to Democratic

- Anchorage

Boroughs and census areas that flipped from Democratic to Republican

- North Slope Borough (largest city: Utqiagvik)

=== By congressional district ===
Due to the state's low population, only one congressional district is allocated. This district, an at-large district because it covers the entire state, is thus equivalent to the statewide election results.

District	Trump	Biden	Representative
At-large	52.83%	42.77%	Don Young

== Analysis ==
Biden narrowly won Anchorage, the state's largest city, outperforming local Democrats. Biden was the first Democrat to win Anchorage since Johnson. This also made Trump the first candidate of either party to prevail in Alaska without winning Anchorage. James Brooks at the Anchorage Daily News attributed Trump's victory to strong performances in the Kenai Peninsula and Matanuska-Susitna Borough.

The election corresponded with the 2020 United States Senate election in Alaska, with incumbent Republican Dan Sullivan being successfully re-elected against independent Al Gross, who was also nominated and endorsed by the Democratic Party. Sullivan won by a 12.71% margin, outperforming Trump by 2.65 percentage points, consistent with a nationwide trend where down-ballot Republicans outperformed Trump. In the United States House of Representatives election in Alaska, incumbent Republican Don Young underperformed Trump by 0.92 percentage points against Democrat-endorsed independent Alyse Galvin.

=== Associated Press exit polling ===
The following are estimates from exit polls conducted by the University of Chicago for the Associated Press interviewing 689 likely voters in Alaska, adjusted to match the actual vote count.

2020 presidential election in Alaska by subgroup (Associated Press exit polling)
Demographic subgroup	Biden	Trump	Jorgensen	% of total vote
Total vote	42.77	52.83	2.47	100
Ideology
Liberals	93	7	<1	29
Moderates	53	41	5	26
Conservatives	5	91	3	45
Party
Democrats or lean Democrat	97	2	<1	38
Republicans or lean Republican	6	90	3	55
Independents	40	38	14	6
Type of vote
Election Day	22	72	5	37
Early in-person	51	47	2	29
Mail	59	38	1	34
Vote in 2016
Hillary Clinton	98	1	<1	30
Donald Trump	5	92	1	44
Someone else	47	33	13	13
Did not vote	–	–	–	14
Gender
Men	36	60	4	53
Women	52	45	1	47
Race/ethnicity
White	44	53	2	72
Black	–	–	–	3
Latino	–	–	–	5
Other	46	49	2	20
Age
18–29 years old	–	–	–	15
30–44 years old	41	56	2	27
45–64 years old	39	57	4	38
65 and older	48	52	<1	20
Religion
Protestant/Other Christian	21	76	2	43
Catholic	–	–	–	12
Other	48	48	1	16
None	74	24	1	29
Sexual orientation
LGBT	–	–	–	5
Heterosexual	40	57	1	95
Education
High school or less	–	–	–	24
Some college education or associate degree	37	58	2	40
College graduate	58	44	7	23
Postgraduate degree	55	43	<1	13
Total household income (2019)
Under $50,000	50	45	3	23
$50,000–$99,999	43	52	3	40
Over $100,000	38	60	2	37
Union households
Yes	–	–	–	28
No	39	59	1	72
Veteran households
Yes	–	–	–	52
No	45	47	8	48
Area type
Urban	51	47	1	21
Suburban	35	59	4	30
Small town	50	46	3	30
Rural	37	61	<1	19

== See also ==
- United States presidential elections in Alaska
- 2020 United States presidential election
- 2020 Democratic Party presidential primaries
- 2020 Libertarian Party presidential primaries
- 2020 Republican Party presidential primaries
- 2020 United States elections

== Notes ==
Partisan clients
