= 2020 United States presidential election in Maine =

- November 3, 2020
- Turnout: 78% (▲5.47 pp)

Nominee	Joe Biden	Donald Trump
Party	Democratic	Republican
Home state	Delaware	Florida
Running mate	Kamala Harris	Mike Pence
Electoral vote	3	1
First round	435,072	360,737
Percentage	53.09%	44.02%

Biden
40–50%
50–60%
60–70%
70–80%
80–90%
90–100%
Trump
40–50%
50–60%
60–70%
70–80%
80–90%
90–100%
Tie/No data
President before election
Donald Trump
Republican
Elected President
Joe Biden
Democratic

The 2020 United States presidential election in Maine was held on Tuesday, November 3, 2020, as part of the 2020 United States presidential election in which all 50 states plus the District of Columbia participated. Maine voters chose electors to represent them in the Electoral College via a popular vote, pitting the Republican Party's nominee, incumbent President Donald Trump, and running mate Vice President Mike Pence against Democratic Party nominee, former Vice President Joe Biden, and his running mate California Senator Kamala Harris. Maine has four electoral votes in the Electoral College. Unlike all other states except Nebraska, Maine awards two electoral votes based on the statewide vote, and one vote for each congressional district.

On election day, Biden carried Maine at-large by nine percentage points and the 1st congressional district by 23 percentage points, garnering three electoral votes. However, the rural 2nd district backed Trump by more than seven percentage points, giving him one electoral vote. This was the same result as 2016, and as such marked only the second time since 1828 that Maine split its electoral votes, as well as the first time since 1828 where the winner of both the election and the national popular vote did not receive all of Maine's electoral votes. Finally, it's also the first election where ME-2 didn't vote for the winner of election and the winner of the national popular at the same time while ME-1 and Maine at large did the opposite.

Maine became the first state to use ranked-choice voting for a presidential general election, with voters able to rank their preferred candidates on the ballot. Majorities were reached in the first round of voting statewide and in each congressional district, so ranked-choice voting's vote transfers and special tabulation were not required.

Biden performed strongly with college-educated voters to win Maine. Maine weighed in for this election as 5% more Democratic than the national average. This is the only state that his running mate Kamala Harris won in 2024 where she received a larger vote total than Biden in 2020.

== Primary elections ==
The primary elections were held on Super Tuesday, March 3, 2020.

=== Republican primary ===
Incumbent President Donald Trump ran unopposed in the Republican primary, and thus he received all of Maine's 22 delegates to the 2020 Republican National Convention.

2020 Maine Republican presidential primary
Candidate	Votes	%	Delegates
Donald Trump (incumbent)	95,360	83.85	22
Blank ballots	18,368	16.15	0
Total	113,728	100%	22

=== Democratic primary ===
Joe Biden won the state primary. Opponent Bernie Sanders won the Maine caucus in 2016.

2020 Maine Democratic presidential primary
Candidate	Votes	%	Delegates
Joe Biden	68,729	33.37	11
Bernie Sanders	66,826	32.45	9
Elizabeth Warren	32,055	15.57	4
Michael Bloomberg	24,294	11.80	
Pete Buttigieg (withdrawn) (Note: Candidate withdrew during absentee voting, shortly before the date of the election.)	4,364	2.12	
Amy Klobuchar (withdrawn)	2,826	1.37	
Tulsi Gabbard	1,815	0.88	
Andrew Yang (withdrawn) (Note: Candidate withdrew following the New Hampshire primary, when absentee voting had already begun.)	696	0.34	
Tom Steyer (withdrawn)	313	0.15	
Deval Patrick (withdrawn)	218	0.11	
Marianne Williamson (withdrawn)	201	0.10	
Cory Booker (withdrawn)	183	0.09	
Blank ballots	3,417	1.66	
Total	205,937	100%	24

=== Libertarian nominee ===
- Jo Jorgensen, Psychology Senior Lecturer at Clemson University

=== Green nominee ===
- Howie Hawkins, co-founder of the Green Party, trade unionist and environmental activist

=== Alliance nominee ===
- Rocky De La Fuente, businessman

== General election ==
=== Ballot access ===
The Libertarian Party was recognized by Maine as an official party in June 2016 but lost that status in December 2018. To qualify for ballot access, Jorgensen was required to submit 4,000 petition signatures to the state by August 3. Jorgensen sued the state for a reduction of the signature requirement, citing an increase in the difficulty of petitioning caused by the COVID-19 pandemic. Jorgensen was successful in appearing on the ballot.

=== Final predictions ===
Source	Statewide	1st district	2nd district
The Cook Political Report	Likely D	Solid D	Tossup
Inside Elections	Solid D	Solid D	Tossup
Sabato's Crystal Ball	Likely D	Safe D	Lean R
Politico	Likely D	Solid D	Tossup
RCP	Lean D	Likely D	Tossup
Niskanen	Safe D	Safe D	Likely R
CNN	Solid D	Solid D	Tossup
The Economist	Safe D	Not given	Not given
CBS News	Likely D	Likely D	Tossup
270towin	Likely D	Safe D	Tossup
ABC News	Solid D	Solid D	Tossup
NPR	Likely D	Likely D	Tossup
NBC News	Likely D	Solid D	Tossup
538	Likely D	Solid D	Tossup

=== Polling ===
==== Graphical summary (statewide) ====
View source data.

Aggregate polls

Source of poll aggregation	Dates administered	Dates updated	Joe Biden Democratic	Donald Trump Republican	Other/ Undecided (Note: Calculated by taking the difference of 100% and all other candidates combined.)	Margin
270 to Win	October 6 – November 1, 2020	November 3, 2020	51.8%	40.2%	8.0%	Biden +11.6
FiveThirtyEight	until November 2, 2020	November 3, 2020	53.3%	40.3%	6.4%	Biden +13.0
Average			53.1%	40.3%	7.2%	Biden +12.3

Statewide polls

Poll source	Date(s) administered	Sample size (Note: Key: A – all adults RV – registered voters LV – likely voters V – unclear)	Margin of error	Donald Trump Republican	Joe Biden Democratic	Jo Jorgensen Libertarian	Howie Hawkins Green	Other	Undecided
Change Research	Oct 29 – Nov 2, 2020	1,024 (LV)	± 3.5%	40%	52%	4%	2%	1% (Note: Did not vote with 1%; "Don't recall" and would not vote with 0%)	1%
SurveyMonkey/Axios	Oct 20 – Nov 2, 2020	1,274 (LV)	± 4%	42% (Note: Overlapping sample with the previous SurveyMonkey/Axios poll, but more information available regarding sample size)	56%	–	–	–	–
Emerson College	Oct 29–31, 2020	611 (LV)	± 3.9%	43% (Note: With voters who lean towards a given candidate)	54%	–	–	2% (Note: "Someone else" with 2%)	–
SurveyMonkey/Axios	Oct 1–28, 2020	1,995 (LV)	–	43%	56%	–	–	–	–
SurveyUSA/FairVote	Oct 23–27, 2020	1,007 (LV)	± 3.7%	40% (Note: Standard VI response)	53%	2%	2%	1% (Note: De La Fuente (A) with 1%)	2%
SurveyUSA/FairVote	Oct 23–27, 2020	1,007 (LV)	± 3.7%	42% (Note: Reassigning the second and third preferences of non-Biden/Trump voters)	55%	–	–	1% (Note: "No second choice"/"no third choice" with 1%)	2%
Colby College	Oct 21–25, 2020	879 (LV)	± 3.3%	38%	51%	–	–	4% (Note: "One of the minor party candidates" with 4%)	8%
Pan Atlantic Research	Oct 2–6, 2020	600 (LV)	± 4.5%	40%	50%	–	–	6% (Note: "All other candidates" with 6%)	4%
Critical Insights/Digital Research/Bangor Daily News	Sep 25 – Oct 4, 2020	466 (LV)	± 4.4%	40%	51%	3%	1%	2% (Note: "Refused" with 2%; De La Fuente (A) with no voters)	3%
Critical Insights/Digital Research/Bangor Daily News	Sep 25 – Oct 4, 2020	466 (LV)	± 4.4%	40% (Note: Ressigning the second preferences of Hawkins and Jorgensen voters)	52%	–	–	5% (Note: "Refused" with 2%; De La Fuente (A), "No second preference" and "Someone else" with 1%; Hawkins (G) with 0%; Jorgensen (L) with no voters)	3%
SurveyMonkey/Axios	Sep 1–30, 2020	729 (LV)	–	38%	60%	–	–	–	2%
Data for Progress (D)	Sep 23–28, 2020	718 (LV)	± 3.7%	39%	53%	2%	1%	–	5%
Data for Progress (D)	Sep 23–28, 2020	718 (LV)	± 3.7%	41% (Note: If the only candidates were Biden and Trump)	55%	–	–	–	4%
Colby College	Sep 17–23, 2020	847 (LV)	± 3.4%	39%	50%	–	–	4% (Note: "A minor party candidate" with 4%)	6%
Suffolk University/Boston Globe	Sep 17–20, 2020	500 (LV)	± 4.4%	39%	51%	1%	0%	1% (Note: "Refused" with 1%; Fuente (A) and "Other" with 0%)	7%
Suffolk University/Boston Globe	Sep 17–20, 2020	500 (LV)	± 4.4%	39%	51%	–	–	2% (Note: "Refused" with 1%; Fuente (A) and Hawkins (G) with 0%; Jorgensen (L) and "Other" with no voters)	8%
Siena College/NYT Upshot	Sep 11–16, 2020	663 (LV)	± 5.1%	38% (Note: Topline after Ranked-Choice Voting is used)	55%	0%	0%	1% (Note: "Someone else" with 0%; would not vote with 1%)	6% (Note: Includes "Refused")
Quinnipiac University	Sep 10–14, 2020	1,183 (LV)	± 2.9%	38%	59%	–	–	0% (Note: "Someone else" with 0%)	3%
Fabrizio Ward/Hart Research Associates/AARP	Aug 30 – Sep 5, 2020	800 (LV)	± 3.5%	40%	54%	–	–	1% (Note: Would not vote with 1%)	5%
SurveyMonkey/Axios	Aug 1–31, 2020	502 (LV)	–	37%	61%	–	–	–	1%
Critical Insights/Digital Research/Bangor Daily News	Jul 28 – Aug 9, 2020	453 (LV)	–	38%	45%	–	–	11% (Note: "Someone else" with 8%; "Prefer not to say" and would not vote with 1%)	6%
Quinnipiac University	Jul 30 – Aug 3, 2020	805 (RV)	± 3.7%	37%	52%	–	–	6% (Note: "Someone else" and would not vote with 3%)	4%
RMG Research	Jul 27 – Aug 2, 2020	500 (RV)	± 4.5%	39%	50%	–	–	7% (Note: "Some other candidate" with 7%)	4%
Data for Progress	Jul 24 – Aug 2, 2020	866 (LV)	–	42%	49%	1%	1%	–	7%
Data for Progress	Jul 24 – Aug 2, 2020	866 (LV)	–	43% (Note: If only Biden and Trump were candidates)	53%	–	–	–	4%
SurveyMonkey/Axios	Jul 1–31, 2020	733 (LV)	–	41%	57%	–	–	–	1%
Public Policy Polling/AFSCME (Note: AFSCME endorsed Biden prior to this poll's sampling period)	Jul 23–24, 2020	962 (V)	–	42%	53%	–	–	–	5%
Colby College/SocialSphere	Jul 18–24, 2020	888 (RV)	± 3.9%	38%	50%	–	–	5% (Note: "One of the minor party candidates" with 5%)	7%
Public Policy Polling	Jul 2–3, 2020	1,022 (V)	± 3.1%	42%	53%	–	–	–	5%
SurveyMonkey/Axios	Jun 8–30, 2020	202 (LV)	–	46%	51%	–	–	–	3%
Public Policy Polling	Mar 2–3, 2020	872 (V)	± 3.3%	42%	52%	–	–	–	6%
Public Policy Polling	Oct 11–13, 2019	939 (LV)	± 3.2%	42%	54%	–	–	–	4%
Fabrizio Ward/AARP	Jul 29–31, 2019	600 (LV)	± 4.0%	44%	50%	–	–	–	5%
Gravis Marketing	Jun 24, 2019	767 (RV)	± 3.5%	46%	54%	–	–	–	–

==== Graphical summary (Maine's 1st congressional district) ====
View source data.

Aggregate polls

Source of poll aggregation	Dates administered	Dates updated	Joe Biden Democratic	Donald Trump Republican	Other/ Undecided	Margin
270 to Win	October 6 – November 1, 2020	November 3, 2020	57.8%	35.0%	7.2%	Biden +22.8
Real Clear Politics	September 17 – October 6, 2020	October 30, 2020	56.7%	34.3%	9.0%	Biden +22.4

with Donald Trump and Joe Biden

Poll source	Date(s) administered	Sample size	Margin of error	Donald Trump Republican	Joe Biden Democratic	Jo Jorgensen Libertarian	Howie Hawkins Green	Other	Undecided
Change Research	Oct 29 – Nov 2, 2020	549 (LV)	–	35%	56%	4%	3%	–	–
Emerson College	Oct 29–31, 2020	310 (LV)	–	39%	58%	–	–	3% (Note: "Someone else" with 3%)	1%
SurveyUSA/FairVote	Oct 23–27, 2020	498 (LV)	–	35%	59%	2%	2%	1%	2%
SurveyUSA/FairVote	Oct 23–27, 2020	498 (LV)	–	36%	61%	–	–	1%	2%
Colby College	Oct 21–25, 2020	426 (LV)	–	34%	56%	–	–	4%	7%
Pan Atlantic Research	Oct 2–6, 2020	300 (LV)	± 6.4%	37%	54%	–	–	7%	–
Critical Insights/Digital Research/Bangor Daily News	Sep 25 – Oct 4, 2020	232 (LV)	–	30%	62%	3%	1%	2% (Note: "Refused" and "Someone else" with 1%; De La Fuente (A) with no voters)	3%
Colby College	Sep 17–23, 2020	416 (LV)	–	36%	54%	–	–	5% (Note: "A minor party candidate" with 5%)	5%
Suffolk University/Boston Globe	Sep 17–20, 2020	267 (LV)	–	33%	54%	2%	0%	1%	9%
Suffolk University/Boston Globe	Sep 17–20, 2020	267 (LV)	–	34%	55%	0%	0%	2% (Note: "Refused" with 2%; Fuente (A) with 0%; "Other" with no voters)	9%
Quinnipiac University	Sep 10–14, 2020	707 (LV)	–	32%	64%	–	–	1% (Note: "Someone else" with 1%)	3%
Fabrizio Ward/Hart Research Associates/AARP	Aug 30 – Sep 5, 2020	433 (LV)	–	35%	58%	–	–	–	–
Critical Insights/Digital Research/Bangor Daily News	Jul 28 – Aug 9, 2020	250 (LV)	–	33%	49%	–	–	11% (Note: "Someone else" with 9%; "Prefer not to say" with 2%; Would not vote with 1%)	6%
Quinnipiac University	Jul 30 – Aug 3, 2020	392 (LV) (Note: Additional data sourced from FiveThirtyEight)	–	30%	61%	–	–	6% (Note: "Someone else" with 2%; would not vote with 4%)	3%
Colby College/SocialSphere	Jul 18–24, 2020	425 (LV)	–	35%	55%	–	–	6% (Note: "One of the minor party candidates" with 6%)	5%
Public Policy Polling	Oct 11–13, 2019	478 (LV)	–	38%	58%	–	–	–	3%

==== Graphical summary (Maine's 2nd congressional district) ====
View source data.

Aggregate polls

Source of poll aggregation	Dates administered	Dates updated	Joe Biden Democratic	Donald Trump Republican	Other/ Undecided	Margin
270 to Win	October 6 – November 1, 2020	November 3, 2020	46.4%	45.2%	8.4%	Biden +1.2
Real Clear Politics	September 17 – October 6, 2020	October 27, 2020	44.7%	45.0%	10.3%	Trump +0.3

with Donald Trump and Joe Biden

Poll source	Date(s) administered	Sample size	Margin of error	Donald Trump Republican	Joe Biden Democratic	Jo Jorgensen Libertarian	Howie Hawkins Green	Other	Undecided
Change Research	Oct 29 – Nov 2, 2020	475 (LV)	± 4.6%	46%	47%	4%	1%	0% (Note: Did not vote, "Don't recall" and would not vote with 0%)	1%
Change Research	Oct 29 – Nov 2, 2020	475 (LV)	± 4.6%	50% (Note: After three rounds of ranked choice voting)	50%	–	–	–	–
Emerson College	Oct 29–31, 2020	301 (LV)	–	47%	50%	–	–	3%	0%
SurveyUSA/FairVote	Oct 23–27, 2020	509 (LV)	–	45%	48%	2%	2%	1%	2%
SurveyUSA/FairVote	Oct 23–27, 2020	509 (LV)	–	49% (Note: With Ranked Choice Voting)	51%	–	–	–	–
Colby College	Oct 21–25, 2020	453 (LV)	–	42%	46%	–	–	4%	9%
Pan Atlantic Research	Oct 2–6, 2020	300 (LV)	± 6.4%	43%	47%	–	–	6%	–
Critical Insights/Digital Research/Bangor Daily News	Sep 25 – Oct 4, 2020	234 (LV)	–	49%	41%	2%	1%	1% (Note: "Refused" with 1%; "Someone else" with 0%; De La Fuente (A) with no voters)	3%
Colby College	Sep 17–23, 2020	425 (LV)	–	43%	46%	–	–	3% (Note: "A minor party candidate" with 3%)	8%
Suffolk University/Boston Globe	Sep 17–20, 2020	233 (LV)	–	45%	47%	0%	0%	1% (Note: "Refused" with 1%; "Other" with 0%; Fuente (A) with no voters)	6%
Suffolk University/Boston Globe	Sep 17–20, 2020	233 (LV)	–	45%	47%	0%	0%	1% (Note: "Refused" with 1%; Fuente (A) and "Other" with no voters)	6%
Siena College/NYT Upshot	Sep 11–16, 2020	440 (LV)	–	45%	47%	–	–	–	–
Quinnipiac University	Sep 10–14, 2020	476 (LV)	–	44%	53%	–	–	0%	3%
Fabrizio Ward/Hart Research Associates/AARP	Aug 30 – Sep 5, 2020	367 (LV)	–	45%	49%	–	–	–	–
Left of Centre PAC (Note: The pollster exclusively supports Democratic candidates)	Aug 25–28, 2020	400 (LV)	± 4.9%	49%	48%	–	–	–	3%
Critical Insights/Digital Research/Bangor Daily News	Jul 28 – Aug 9, 2020	249 (LV)	–	38%	39%	–	–	12% (Note: "Someone else" with 8%; "Prefer not to say" and would not vote with 2%)	11%
Quinnipiac University	Jul 30 – Aug 3, 2020	382 (RV)	–	45%	44%	–	–	6%	5%
Colby College/SocialSphere	Jul 18–24, 2020	449 (LV)	–	42%	45%	–	–	4%	9%
Public Policy Polling	Oct 11–13, 2019	461 (LV)	–	46%	49%	–	–	–	4%

Former candidates

with Donald Trump and Pete Buttigieg

Poll source	Date(s) administered	Sample size	Margin of error	Donald Trump (R)	Pete Buttigieg (D)	Undecided
Public Policy Polling	Oct 11–13, 2019	939 (LV)	± 3.2%	43%	52%	5%
Gravis Marketing	Jun 24, 2019	767 (RV)	± 3.5%	49%	51%	–

with Donald Trump and Kamala Harris

Poll source	Date(s) administered	Sample size	Margin of error	Donald Trump (R)	Kamala Harris (D)	Undecided
Public Policy Polling	Oct 11–13, 2019	939 (LV)	± 3.2%	44%	50%	6%
Gravis Marketing	Jun 24, 2019	767 (RV)	± 3.5%	48%	52%	–

with Donald Trump and Bernie Sanders

Poll source	Date(s) administered	Sample size	Margin of error	Donald Trump (R)	Bernie Sanders (D)	Undecided
Public Policy Polling	Mar 2–3, 2020	872 (V)	± 3.3%	42%	52%	7%
Public Policy Polling	Oct 11–13, 2019	939 (LV)	± 3.2%	43%	53%	4%
Gravis Marketing	Jun 24, 2019	767 (RV)	± 3.5%	47%	53%	–

with Donald Trump and Elizabeth Warren

Poll source	Date(s) administered	Sample size	Margin of error	Donald Trump (R)	Elizabeth Warren (D)	Undecided
Public Policy Polling	Oct 11–13, 2019	939 (LV)	± 3.2%	43%	53%	4%
Gravis Marketing	Jun 24, 2019	767 (RV)	± 3.5%	48%	52%	–

with Pete Buttigieg in Maine's 1st congressional district

Poll source	Date(s) administered	Sample size	Margin of error	Donald Trump (R)	Pete Buttigieg (D)	Undecided
Public Policy Polling	Oct 11–13, 2019	478 (LV)	–	38%	58%	3%

with Kamala Harris in Maine's 1st congressional district

Poll source	Date(s) administered	Sample size	Margin of error	Donald Trump (R)	Kamala Harris (D)	Undecided
Public Policy Polling	Oct 11–13, 2019	478 (LV)	–	39%	57%	4%

with Bernie Sanders in Maine's 1st congressional district

Poll source	Date(s) administered	Sample size	Margin of error	Donald Trump (R)	Bernie Sanders (D)	Undecided
Public Policy Polling	Oct 11–13, 2019	478 (LV)	–	39%	57%	4%

with Elizabeth Warren in Maine's 1st congressional district

Poll source	Date(s) administered	Sample size	Margin of error	Donald Trump (R)	Elizabeth Warren (D)	Undecided
Public Policy Polling	Oct 11–13, 2019	478 (LV)	–	39%	57%	3%

with Pete Buttigieg in Maine's 2nd congressional district

Poll source	Date(s) administered	Sample size	Margin of error	Donald Trump (R)	Pete Buttigieg (D)	Undecided
Public Policy Polling	Oct 11–13, 2019	461 (LV)	–	49%	44%	7%

with Kamala Harris in Maine's 2nd congressional district

Poll source	Date(s) administered	Sample size	Margin of error	Donald Trump (R)	Kamala Harris (D)	Undecided
Public Policy Polling	Oct 11–13, 2019	461 (LV)	–	49%	43%	8%

with Bernie Sanders in Maine's 2nd congressional district

Poll source	Date(s) administered	Sample size	Margin of error	Donald Trump (R)	Bernie Sanders (D)	Undecided
Public Policy Polling	Oct 11–13, 2019	461 (LV)	–	47%	49%	4%

with Elizabeth Warren in Maine's 2nd congressional district

Poll source	Date(s) administered	Sample size	Margin of error	Donald Trump (R)	Elizabeth Warren (D)	Undecided
Public Policy Polling	Oct 11–13, 2019	461 (LV)	–	48%	47%	5%

Hypothetical polling

with Generic Democrat

Poll source	Date(s) administered	Sample size	Margin of error	Donald Trump (R)	Generic Democrat (D)	Undecided
Colby College/SocialSphere	Feb 10–13, 2020	1,008 (LV)	± 3.1%	34%	37%	30% (Note: "It depends on who the Democratic candidate is" and "Undecided at this time" with 15%)

with Generic Opponent

Poll source	Date(s) administered	Sample size	Margin of error	Donald Trump (R)	Generic Opponent	Undecided
Pan Atlantic Research	Mar 4–13, 2019	500 (LV)	± 4.4%	27%	53%	19% (Note: "Consider voting for Trump" with 15%; Undecided with 5%)

with Generic Democrat in Maine's 1st congressional district

Poll source	Date(s) administered	Sample size	Margin of error	Donald Trump (R)	Generic Democrat (D)	Undecided
Colby College/SocialSphere	Feb 10–13, 2020	515 (LV)	–	28%	41%	31% (Note: "It depends on who the Democratic candidate is" with 15%; "Undecided at this time" with 16%)

with Generic Democrat in Maine's 2nd congressional district

Poll source	Date(s) administered	Sample size	Margin of error	Donald Trump (R)	Generic Democrat (D)	Undecided
Colby College/SocialSphere	Feb 10–13, 2020	493 (LV)	–	41%	34%	28% (Note: "It depends on who the Democratic candidate is" with 14%; "Undecided at this time" with 14%)

=== Results ===
2020 United States presidential election in Maine
Party	Candidate	Votes	%	±%
Democratic	Joe Biden Kamala Harris	435,072	53.09%	+5.26%
Republican	Donald Trump Mike Pence	360,737	44.02%	−0.85%
Libertarian	Jo Jorgensen Spike Cohen	14,152	1.73%	−3.36%
Green	Howie Hawkins Angela Walker	8,230	1.00%	−0.91%
Alliance	Rocky De La Fuente Darcy Richardson	1,183	0.15%	N/A
Write-in		87	0.01%	N/A
Total votes		819,461	100.00%	
Democratic win				

==== By county ====
County	Joe Biden Democratic		Donald Trump Republican		Various candidates Other parties		Margin		Total votes cast
County	#	%	#	%	#	%	#	%	Total votes cast
Androscoggin	27,617	47.04%	29,268	49.85%	1,822	3.10%	-1,651	-2.81%	58,707
Aroostook	13,956	39.04%	21,080	58.97%	710	1.99%	-7,124	-19.93%	35,746
Cumberland	128,759	66.45%	59,584	30.75%	5,422	2.80%	69,175	35.70%	193,765
Franklin	8,069	46.40%	8,754	50.34%	567	3.26%	-685	-3.94%	17,390
Hancock	19,369	54.83%	14,982	42.41%	974	2.76%	4,387	12.42%	35,325
Kennebec	34,902	48.57%	34,721	48.32%	2,235	3.11%	181	0.25%	71,858
Knox	15,110	58.72%	9,982	38.79%	642	2.49%	5,128	19.93%	25,734
Lincoln	12,684	53.76%	10,256	43.47%	654	2.77%	2,428	10.29%	23,594
Oxford	14,755	44.06%	17,698	52.84%	1,039	3.10%	-2,943	-8.79%	33,492
Penobscot	37,713	44.23%	44,825	52.57%	2,731	3.20%	-7,112	-8.34%	85,269
Piscataquis	3,517	35.50%	6,143	62.00%	248	2.50%	-2,626	-26.50%	9,908
Sagadahoc	13,528	56.28%	9,755	40.58%	755	3.14%	3,773	15.70%	24,038
Somerset	10,199	36.98%	16,644	60.35%	735	2.67%	-6,445	-23.37%	27,578
Waldo	12,345	50.76%	11,196	46.03%	781	3.21%	1,149	4.72%	24,322
Washington	6,761	38.95%	10,194	58.73%	402	2.32%	-3,433	-19.78%	17,357
York	71,189	54.90%	54,817	42.28%	3,653	2.82%	16,372	12.63%	129,659
Totals (Note: UOCAVA ballots, totaling 4,599 for Biden, 838 for Trump, and 282 for another candidate, are not delineated by geography.)	435,072	53.09%	360,737	44.02%	23,652	2.89%	74,335	9.07%	819,461

Counties that flipped from Republican to Democratic

- Kennebec (largest municipality: Augusta)

==== By congressional district ====
Biden won the first of Maine's two congressional districts. Trump won the other district, which elected a Democrat to the House of Representatives in the same election cycle.

District	Biden		Trump		Other		Representative
District	#	%	#	%	#	%	Representative
1st	266,376	60.11%	164,045	37.02%	12,691	2.86%	Chellie Pingree
2nd	168,696	44.82%	196,692	52.26%	10,961	2.91%	Jared Golden

== Analysis ==
Biden carried the Pine Tree State by a 9.07% margin over Trump, improving over Hillary Clinton's 3% win margin in 2016. Biden handily carried Maine's 1st congressional district by 23%, while Trump carried its 2nd congressional district by 7.4%, winning a single electoral vote from the state. This marked the first election in history in which Maine and Nebraska both split their electoral votes. Ranked-choice tabulation was ultimately not used as Biden earned a majority statewide and in the 1st district, while Trump earned a majority in the 2nd district. Biden narrowly flipped Kennebec County (home to the state capital, Augusta) four years after Clinton lost it. All other counties favored the same party they did in 2016.

Maine is located in New England, an area that has become a Democratic Party stronghold. It was once a classic Rockefeller Republican state, but social issues have moved it to the Democratic column. The last Republican to win all its electoral votes was George H. W. Bush in 1988. Per exit polls by the Associated Press, Biden's strength in Maine came from liberals, with Biden winning whites 54%–44%, including 56% of white women. Biden was even competitive with Trump among Maine's gun owners, a traditionally Republican interest group, capturing 42% of their vote to Trump's 57%.

This was the first presidential election since 2004 in which Maine's 2nd congressional district backed the losing candidate, and the 2nd district is the only part of the so-called Blue Wall which Trump won in 2020, referring to states and electoral-vote areas that voted Democratic in every election from 1992 to 2012; Biden thus became the first Democrat since 1976 to win the White House without carrying this district, and consequently also the first since said election to win without carrying all of the electoral votes located in New England. Biden also became the first Democrat since 1892 to win the White House without carrying Androscoggin County, the first since 1976 to do so without carrying Aroostook, Franklin, Oxford, Penobscot, or Washington counties, and the first since 1992 to do so without carrying Somerset County.

=== Edison exit polls ===
2020 presidential election in Maine by demographic subgroup (Edison exit polling)
Demographic subgroup	Biden	Trump	% of total vote
Total vote	53.09	44.02	100
Ideology
Liberals	93	4	28
Moderates	61	37	42
Conservatives	9	89	30
Party
Democrats	94	5	28
Republicans	9	89	31
Independents	59	35	41
Gender
Men	42	52	41
Women	61	38	59
Race/ethnicity
White	53	44	95
Non-white	47	46	5
Age
18–24 years old	66	31	8
25–29 years old	53	37	7
30–39 years old	59	38	13
40–49 years old	38	56	13
50–64 years old	49	50	31
65 and older	59	40	28
Sexual orientation
LGBT	–	–	6
Not LGBT	54	43	94
Education
High school or less	35	62	21
Some college education	50	47	28
Associate degree	47	49	12
Bachelor's degree	67	32	22
Postgraduate degree	66	30	17
Issue regarded as most important
Racial inequality	96	3	15
Coronavirus	88	10	21
Economy	6	92	35
Crime and safety	–	–	8
Health care	–	–	11
Region
Portland area	73	23	17
Southern Maine	54	43	36
Bangor/Auburn	48	48	18
Downeast/Upcountry	43	55	29
Area type
Urban	–	–	5
Suburban	55	42	45
Rural	50	48	51
Family's financial situation today
Better than four years ago	16	80	38
Worse than four years ago	91	8	21
About the same	66	32	38

== See also ==
- 2020 Maine elections
- United States presidential elections in Maine
- 2020 United States presidential election
- 2020 Democratic Party presidential primaries
- 2020 Republican Party presidential primaries
- 2020 United States elections

== Notes ==
Partisan clients
