= 2020 United States presidential election in North Dakota =

- November 3, 2020
- Turnout: 62.65% ▲1.26 pp

Nominee	Donald Trump	Joe Biden
Party	Republican	Democratic–NPL
Home state	Florida	Delaware
Running mate	Mike Pence	Kamala Harris
Electoral vote	3	0
Popular vote	235,751	115,042
Percentage	65.12%	31.78%

Trump
40–50%
50–60%
60–70%
70–80%
80–90%
90–100%
Biden
40–50%
50–60%
60–70%
70–80%
80–90%
90–100%
President before election
Donald Trump
Republican
Elected President
Joe Biden
Democratic-NPL

The 2020 United States presidential election in North Dakota was held on Tuesday, November 3, 2020, as part of the 2020 United States presidential election in which all 50 states plus the District of Columbia participated. North Dakota voters chose electors to represent them in the Electoral College via a popular vote, pitting the Republican nominee, incumbent President Donald Trump from Florida, and running mate Vice President Mike Pence from Indiana against Democratic nominee, former Vice President Joe Biden from Delaware, and his running mate Senator Kamala Harris of California. North Dakota has three electoral votes in the Electoral College.

Trump easily won North Dakota 65.1% to 31.8%, a margin of 33.34%, about three points down from his 36-point victory in 2016. Joe Biden won the same two counties Walter Mondale, Al Gore and Hillary Clinton won in 1984, 2000 and 2016 respectively: the majority-Native American counties of Rolette and Sioux, both of which have long been Democratic strongholds. However, Biden only came 2.7 points short of winning Cass County, which holds the state's largest city of Fargo, as compared to Clinton's 10.5-point loss in 2016.

Biden became the first Democrat to win the presidency without winning Sargent County since Franklin D. Roosevelt in 1944 and the first without Benson, Ransom, or Steele Counties since John F. Kennedy in 1960. Despite Biden's modest improvement over Hillary Clinton four years earlier, this is the third-worst Democratic performance in the state since 1980, and the 2024 election. Trump's vote share was also the largest for any candidate in the state since 1952.

== Caucuses ==
=== Democratic caucuses ===
The North Dakota Democratic–NPL Party held a firehouse caucus on March 10, 2020.

All of the withdrawn candidates had withdrawn from the race while mail-in voting had already begun.

2020 North Dakota Democratic presidential caucuses
Candidate	Votes	%	Delegates
Bernie Sanders	7,682	52.81	8
Joe Biden	5,742	39.47	6
Elizabeth Warren (withdrawn)	366	2.52	
Amy Klobuchar (withdrawn)	223	1.53	
Pete Buttigieg (withdrawn)	164	1.13	
Michael Bloomberg (withdrawn)	113	0.78	
Tulsi Gabbard	89	0.61	
Andrew Yang (withdrawn)	20	0.14	
Tom Steyer (withdrawn)	6	0.04	
Michael Bennet (withdrawn)	3	0.02	
John Delaney (withdrawn)	3	0.02	
Deval Patrick (withdrawn)	2	0.01	
Unsigned votes / Overvotes / Blank Votes	(Note: Unsigned 87, over 7, blank 39 votes)133	0.91	
Total	14,546	100%	14

=== Republican caucuses ===
The North Dakota Republican Party held a non-binding firehouse caucus on March 10, 2020, with incumbent President Donald Trump running unopposed.

The party then formally selected their 29 Republican National Convention delegates, unpledged to any particular candidate at the state party convention. The state party convention was originally scheduled for March 27–29, but due to concerns over the COVID-19 pandemic it was ultimately cancelled.

=== Libertarian nominee ===
- Jo Jorgensen, Psychology Senior Lecturer at Clemson University

== General election ==
=== Final predictions ===
Source	Ranking
The Cook Political Report	Solid R
Inside Elections	Solid R
Sabato's Crystal Ball	Safe R
Politico	Solid R
RCP	Solid R
Niskanen	Safe R
CNN	Solid R
The Economist	Safe R
CBS News	Likely R
270towin	Safe R
ABC News	Solid R
NPR	Likely R
NBC News	Solid R
538	Solid R

=== Polling ===
View source data.

Polls with a sample size of <100 have their sample size entries marked in red to indicate a lack of reliability.

Aggregate polls

Source of poll aggregation	Dates administered	Dates updated	Joe Biden Democratic-NPL	Donald Trump Republican	Other/ Undecided (Note: Calculated by taking the difference of 100% and all other candidates combined.)	Margin
270 to Win	September 26 – October 17, 2020	October 19, 2020	38.0%	57.5%	4.5%	Trump +19.5
FiveThirtyEight	until November 2, 2020	November 3, 2020	38.7%	56.0%	5.3%	Trump +17.3
Average			38.4%	56.8%	4.8%	Trump +18.4

Polls

Poll source	Date(s) administered	Sample size (Note: Key: A – all adults RV – registered voters LV – likely voters V – unclear)	Margin of error	Donald Trump Republican	Joe Biden Democratic-NPL	Jo Jorgensen Libertarian	Other	Undecided
SurveyMonkey/Axios	Oct 20 – Nov 2, 2020	402 (LV)	± 7%	59% (Note: Overlapping sample with the previous SurveyMonkey/Axios poll, but more information available regarding sample size)	39%	–	–	–
SurveyMonkey/Axios	Oct 1–28, 2020	700 (LV)	–	57%	42%	–	–	–
SurveyMonkey/Axios	Sep 1–30, 2020	249 (LV)	–	63%	34%	–	–	3%
DFM Research/North Dakota Voters First	Sep 26–29, 2020	460 (A)	± 4.6%	51%	37%	–	4% (Note: "Other candidate" with 4%)	7%
DFM Research/North Dakota Voters First	Sep 12–16, 2020	500 (LV)	± 4.5%	56%	37%	–	3% (Note: "Other candidate" with 3%)	4%
SurveyMonkey/Axios	Aug 1–31, 2020	269 (LV)	–	66%	32%	–	–	2%
SurveyMonkey/Axios	Jul 1–31, 2020	261 (LV)	–	63%	36%	–	–	1%
SurveyMonkey/Axios	Jun 8–30, 2020	88 (LV)	–	71%	28%	–	–	1%
DFM Research	Mar 3–5, 2020	400 (LV)	± 4.9%	55%	38%	–	2%	5%
DFM Research	Jan 28 – Feb 1, 2020	600 (A)	± 4.0%	59%	34%	–	2%	5%
1892 Polling/Doug Burgum (Note: Poll sponsored by Burgum's campaign)	Jul 15–17, 2019	500 (LV)	± 4.4%	60%	34%	–	–	–
DFM Research	May 14–18, 2019	400 (A)	± 4.9%	54%	39%	–	2%	5%

Former candidates

with Donald J. Trump and Michael Bloomberg

Poll source	Date(s) administered	Sample size	Margin of error	Donald J. Trump (R)	Michael Bloomberg (D-NPL)	Other	Undecided
DFM Research	Jan 28 – Feb 1, 2020	600 (A)	± 4.0%	59%	32%	1%	7%

with Donald J. Trump and Pete Buttigieg

Poll source	Date(s) administered	Sample size	Margin of error	Donald J. Trump (R)	Pete Buttigieg (D-NPL)	Other	Undecided
DFM Research	Jan 28 – Feb 1, 2020	600 (A)	± 4.0%	59%	31%	2%	8%

with Donald J. Trump and Amy Klobuchar

Poll source	Date(s) administered	Sample size	Margin of error	Donald J. Trump (R)	Amy Klobuchar (D-NPL)	Other	Undecided
DFM Research	Jan 28 – Feb 1, 2020	600 (A)	± 4.0%	59%	33%	1%	7%

with Donald J. Trump and Bernie Sanders

Poll source	Date(s) administered	Sample size	Margin of error	Donald J. Trump (R)	Bernie Sanders (D-NPL)	Other	Undecided
DFM Research	Mar 3–5, 2020	400 (LV)	± 4.9%	58%	33%	4%	4%
DFM Research	Jan 28 – Feb 1, 2020	600 (A)	± 4.0%	61%	32%	1%	5%

with Donald J. Trump and Elizabeth Warren

Poll source	Date(s) administered	Sample size	Margin of error	Donald J. Trump (R)	Elizabeth Warren (D-NPL)	Other	Undecided
DFM Research	Jan 28 – Feb 1, 2020	600 (A)	± 4.0%	62%	31%	2%	6%
Zogby Analytics	Aug 17–23, 2017	403 (LV)	± 4.9%	47%	36%	–	17%

=== Electoral slates ===
These slates of electors were nominated by each party in order to vote in the Electoral College should their candidate win the state:

Donald Trump and Mike Pence Republican Party	Joe Biden and Kamala Harris Democratic-NPL Party	Jo Jorgensen and Spike Cohen Libertarian Party
Sandy J. Boehler; Ray Holmberg; Robert Wefald	Heidi Heitkamp; Bernice Knutson; Warren Larson	Dustin Gawrylow; Martin J. Riske; Dylan Stuckey

=== Results ===
2020 United States presidential election in North Dakota
Party	Candidate	Votes	%	±%
Republican	Donald Trump Mike Pence	235,751	65.12%	+2.17%
Democratic–NPL	Joe Biden Kamala Harris	115,042	31.78%	+4.53%
Libertarian	Jo Jorgensen Spike Cohen	9,371	2.59%	−3.64%
Write-in		1,860	0.51%	−1.34%
Total votes		362,024	100.00%	N/A
Republican hold				

==== By county ====
County	Donald Trump Republican		Joe Biden Democratic-NPL		Various candidates Other parties		Margin		Total
County	#	%	#	%	#	%	#	%	Total
Adams	981	77.30%	258	20.33%	30	2.37%	723	56.97%	1,269
Barnes	3,568	64.12%	1,820	32.70%	177	3.18%	1,748	31.42%	5,565
Benson	1,094	55.79%	822	41.92%	45	2.29%	272	13.87%	1,961
Billings	541	85.20%	72	11.34%	22	3.46%	469	73.86%	635
Bottineau	2,575	74.19%	821	23.65%	75	2.16%	1,754	50.54%	3,471
Bowman	1,395	84.19%	228	13.76%	34	2.05%	1,167	70.43%	1,657
Burke	994	86.06%	137	11.86%	24	2.08%	857	74.20%	1,155
Burleigh	34,744	68.46%	14,348	28.27%	1,661	3.27%	20,396	40.19%	50,753
Cass	42,619	49.53%	40,311	46.84%	3,123	3.63%	2,308	2.69%	86,053
Cavalier	1,499	74.21%	474	23.47%	47	2.32%	1,025	50.74%	2,020
Dickey	1,742	71.86%	608	25.08%	74	3.06%	1,134	46.78%	2,424
Divide	904	75.21%	265	22.05%	33	2.74%	639	53.16%	1,202
Dunn	1,951	83.45%	342	14.63%	45	1.92%	1,609	68.82%	2,338
Eddy	854	67.72%	383	30.37%	24	1.91%	471	37.35%	1,261
Emmons	1,738	86.51%	237	11.80%	34	1.69%	1,501	74.71%	2,009
Foster	1,362	76.60%	373	20.98%	43	2.42%	989	55.62%	1,778
Golden Valley	871	84.89%	137	13.35%	18	1.76%	634	71.54%	1,026
Grand Forks	16,987	54.85%	12,880	41.59%	1,103	3.56%	4,107	13.26%	30,970
Grant	1,145	82.91%	207	14.99%	29	2.10%	938	67.92%	1,381
Griggs	907	72.56%	308	24.64%	35	2.80%	599	47.92%	1,250
Hettinger	1,091	83.16%	196	14.94%	25	1.90%	895	68.22%	1,312
Kidder	1,215	83.22%	221	15.14%	24	1.64%	994	68.08%	1,460
LaMoure	1,645	74.13%	527	23.75%	47	2.12%	1,118	50.38%	2,219
Logan	930	86.43%	128	11.90%	18	1.67%	802	74.53%	1,076
McHenry	2,364	78.72%	564	18.78%	75	2.50%	1,800	59.94%	3,003
McIntosh	1,153	79.24%	261	17.94%	41	2.82%	892	61.30%	1,455
McKenzie	4,482	82.71%	814	15.02%	123	2.27%	3,668	67.69%	5,419
McLean	4,198	75.83%	1,230	22.22%	108	1.95%	2,968	53.61%	5,536
Mercer	3,856	82.48%	704	15.06%	115	2.46%	3,152	67.42%	4,675
Morton	12,243	73.67%	3,872	23.30%	504	3.03%	8,371	50.37%	16,619
Mountrail	2,824	67.80%	1,256	30.16%	85	2.04%	1,568	37.64%	4,165
Nelson	1,141	64.21%	586	32.98%	50	2.81%	555	31.23%	1,777
Oliver	918	86.12%	129	12.10%	19	1.78%	789	74.02%	1,066
Pembina	2,460	73.85%	786	23.60%	85	2.55%	1,674	50.25%	3,331
Pierce	1,585	74.48%	497	23.36%	46	2.16%	1,088	51.12%	2,128
Ramsey	3,577	66.59%	1,639	30.51%	156	2.90%	1,938	36.08%	5,372
Ransom	1,418	57.78%	945	38.51%	91	3.71%	473	19.27%	2,454
Renville	1,065	80.74%	220	16.68%	34	2.58%	845	64.06%	1,319
Richland	5,072	64.93%	2,510	32.13%	230	2.94%	2,562	32.80%	7,812
Rolette	1,257	33.04%	2,482	65.25%	65	1.71%	-1,225	-32.21%	3,804
Sargent	1,266	61.16%	738	35.65%	66	3.19%	528	25.51%	2,070
Sheridan	688	84.73%	104	12.81%	20	2.46%	584	71.92%	812
Sioux	258	21.75%	804	67.79%	124	10.46%	-546	-46.04%	1,186
Slope	380	88.99%	44	10.30%	3	0.71%	336	78.69%	427
Stark	12,110	80.47%	2,499	16.60%	441	2.93%	9,611	63.87%	15,050
Steele	652	59.93%	392	36.03%	44	4.04%	260	23.90%	1,088
Stutsman	6,994	70.23%	2,676	26.87%	289	2.90%	4,318	43.36%	9,959
Towner	830	70.70%	317	27.00%	27	2.30%	513	43.70%	1,174
Traill	2,522	60.98%	1,493	36.10%	121	2.92%	1,029	24.88%	4,136
Walsh	3,324	69.50%	1,333	27.87%	126	2.63%	1,991	41.63%	4,783
Ward	19,974	70.71%	7,293	25.82%	979	3.47%	12,681	44.89%	28,246
Wells	1,893	79.74%	442	18.62%	39	1.64%	1,451	61.12%	2,374
Williams	11,739	81.90%	2,169	15.13%	426	2.97%	9,570	66.77%	14,334
Totals	235,595	65.11%	114,902	31.76%	11,322	3.13%	120,693	33.35%	361,819

==== By congressional district ====
Due to the state's low population, only one congressional district is allocated. This district is an at-large district, because it covers the entire state, and thus is equivalent to the statewide election results.

District	Trump	Biden	Representative
At-large	65.12%	31.78%	Kelly Armstrong

== Analysis ==
North Dakota, a rural state covered in the Midwestern Plains, is one of the most reliably Republican states in the nation. It last voted for a Democrat in 1964, when Lyndon B. Johnson carried it against the backdrop of his nationwide landslide victory. Since 1964, North Dakota has been competitive in only three elections: 1976, 1996, and 2008.

A few prime reasons why this state votes heavily for Republicans include its older, majority-White populace; agribusiness; and the state's recent oil boom. In recent presidential elections, Bakken shale oil has been a major driver of conservative success in the state, as the oil boom increasingly fuels the economy of North Dakota. The main oil boom has taken place in the western counties—perhaps Trump's main base. Trump signed executive orders on his first month in office, reviving the Keystone and Dakota Access Pipelines rejected by the Obama administration.

== See also ==
- United States presidential elections in North Dakota
- Presidency of Joe Biden
- 2020 United States presidential election
- 2020 Democratic Party presidential primaries
- 2020 Libertarian Party presidential primaries
- 2020 Republican Party presidential primaries
- 2020 United States elections

== Notes ==
Partisan clients
