= Sunil Freeman =

American socialist political candidate, activist and poet

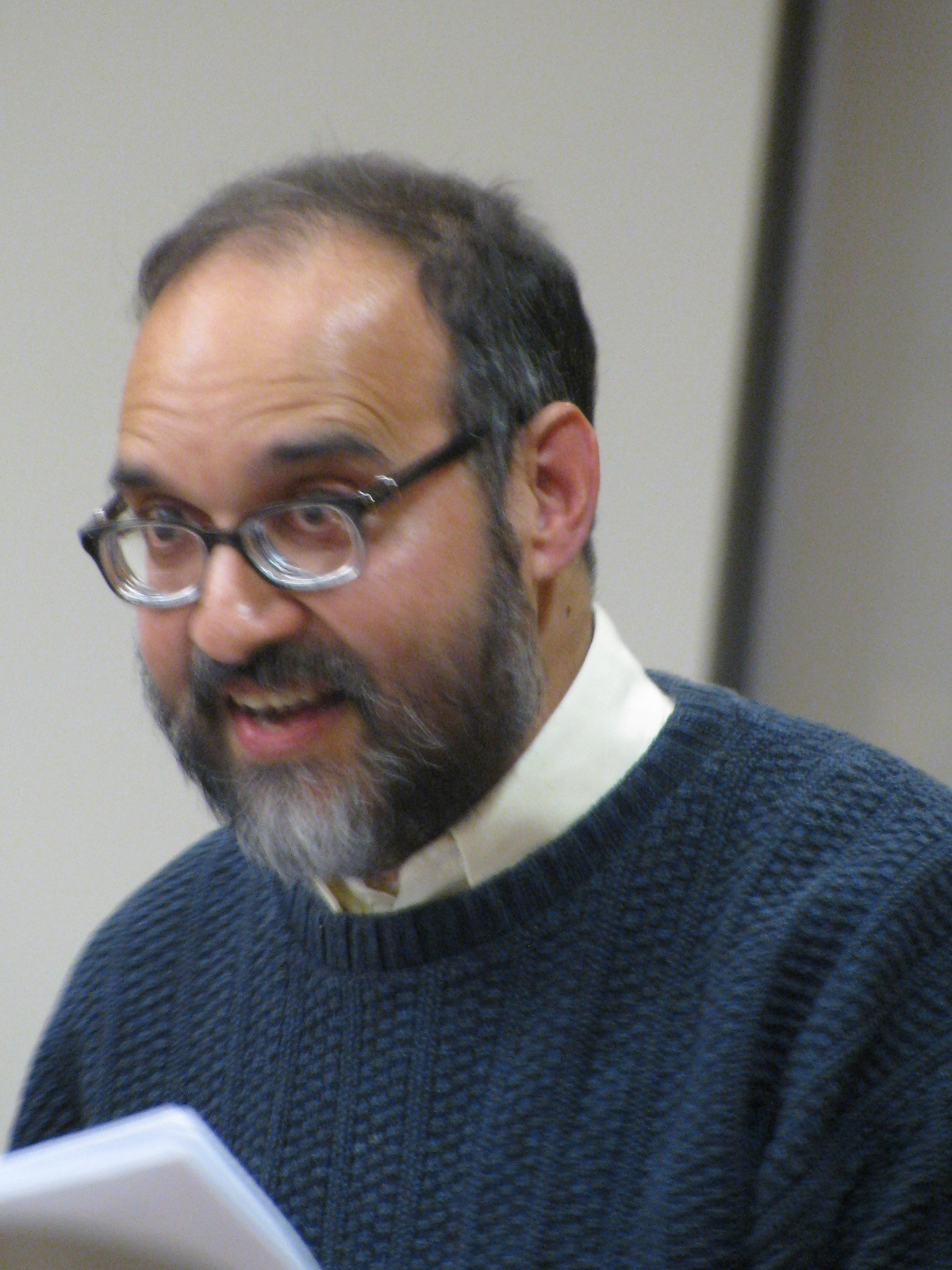
- Freeman in 2014
- Political party: Party for Socialism and Liberation
- Parents: Charles Freeman (father); Flora Navita (mother)

Sunil Freeman (active 1989–present) is an American socialist political candidate, activist, and poet who was the Party for Socialism and Liberation nominee for vice-president in the 2020 Presidential election. Freeman is the assistant director of The Writer's Center in Bethesda, Maryland.

== Early life and career ==
Freeman was born to Flora Navita, an Indian teacher working at a refugee camp in Varanasi, and Charles Freeman, an American who visited India as part of an American peace group in Raleigh, North Carolina. Accourding to Sunil, his mother retained her Indian citizenship and was raised in New Delhi, where she attended Isabel Thoburn College. Freeman grew up in Maryland outside of Washington, D.C., and both of his parents strongly opposed the Vietnam War.

During the 1980s, he worked for The Washington Post as a critic. As of 2010, Freedman is the assistant director of The Writer's Center in Bethesda, Maryland.

== Activism and political candidacy ==
He joined the Party for Socialism and Liberation in 2005 after becoming an organizer with the ANSWER Coalition in the anti-Iraq War movement. He also took part in opposition to the United States embargo against Cuba and against sanctions levied by the US against multiple foreign nations.

=== 2020 Vice-Presidential Campaign ===
Freeman joined the Party for Socialism and Liberation ticket in replacement of Leonard Peltier, who was experiencing health issues. The ticket obtained no electoral votes in the election, and a total of 85,623 nationally, or about 0.05% of the total, being sixth most voted candidate, after Rocky de la Fuente, and ahead of Kanye West.
