= Mark Charles =

Native American activist

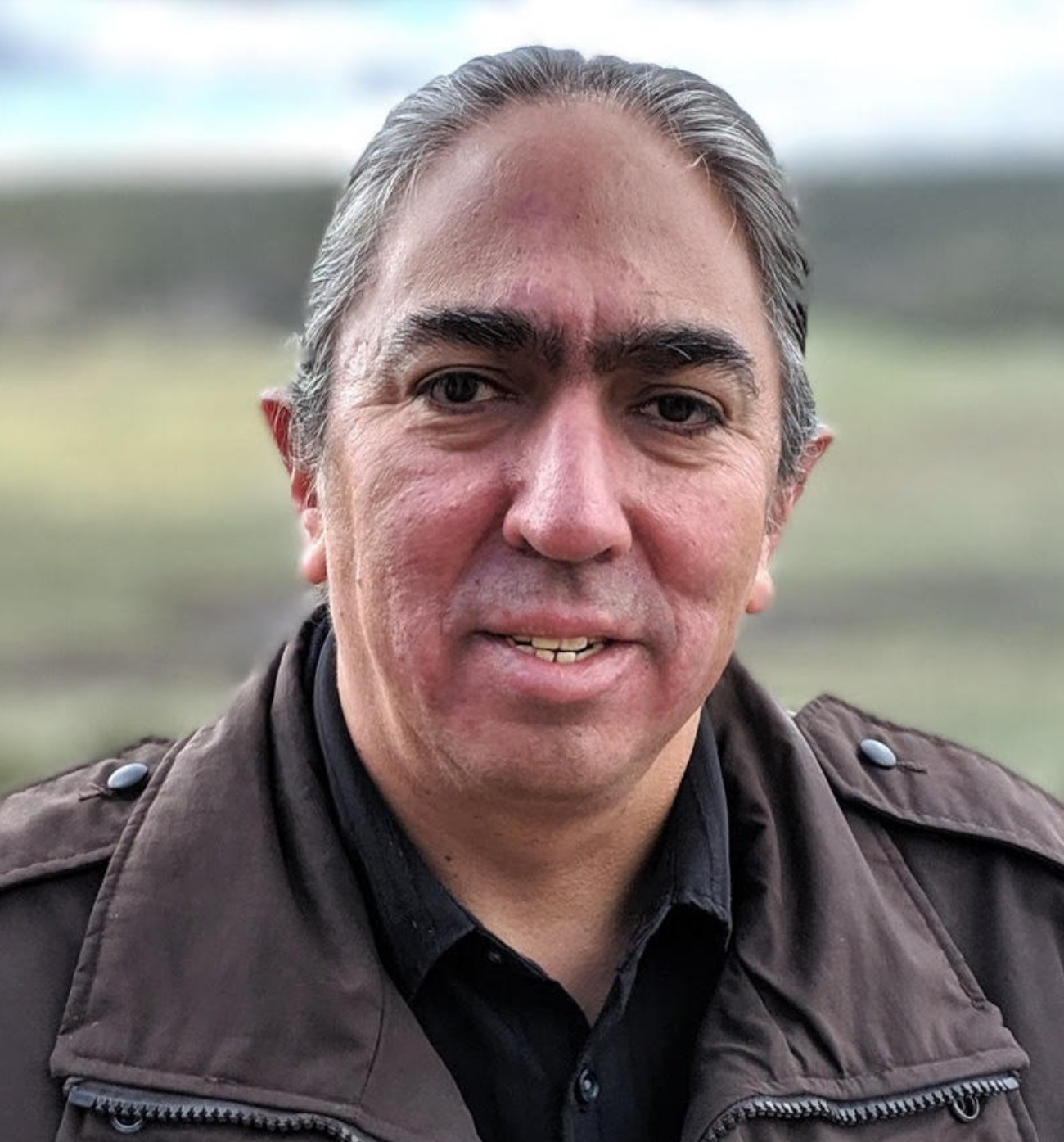
- Charles in 2019
- Born: Gallup, New Mexico, U.S.
- Education: University of California, Los Angeles
- Political party: Independent
- Website: Official website

Mark R. Charles is a Native American activist, public speaker, consultant, and author on Native American issues, as well as a journalist, blogger, Reformed pastor, and computer programmer. He was an independent candidate for president of the United States in the 2020 United States presidential election.

== Early life ==
Charles, the son of a Navajo father and a Dutch-American mother, grew up in Gallup, New Mexico. He is a graduate of University of California, Los Angeles (UCLA).

== Activism and career ==
As an activist, Charles is known for denouncing the doctrine of discovery and for his opposition to the Dakota Access Pipeline.

Charles is a former pastor at the Christian Indian Center in Denver, Colorado. He is a consultant for the Calvin Institute of Christian Worship, as well as the Washington, D.C., correspondent for Native News Online. Since 2008, he has written the blog Wirelesshogan: Reflections from the Hogan. He co-wrote the book Unsettling Truths: The Ongoing, Dehumanizing Legacy of the Doctrine of Discovery, published in 2019 by InterVarsity Press.

== 2020 presidential campaign ==
On May 28, 2019, Charles announced via a YouTube video that he was running for president of the United States as an independent in the 2020 election. On August 20, he spoke at the Frank LaMere Native American Presidential Forum, alongside major candidates including Bernie Sanders, Elizabeth Warren, and Kamala Harris.

On July 25, 2020, Charles announced his choice of former Green Party presidential candidate Sedinam Moyowasifza-Curry as his running mate. Less than three weeks later, on August 14, his campaign released a statement saying that Sedinam Moyowasifza-Curry had been dropped as Charles' running mate. On August 26, Charles announced that Adrian Wallace, Vice President of the Lexington NAACP and Chairman of the Kentucky State Conference of the NAACP, had been chosen as his running mate.

Charles had ballot access in Colorado with write-in access in several other states. He officially received a total of 3,098 votes, including 2,011 votes from ballot access and 1,087 reported write-in votes.

== Personal life ==
Charles is a Christian. He was a pastor for a Christian Reformed Church for two years.
