= 270toWin =

American political website

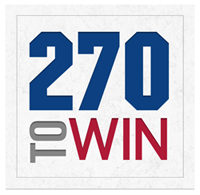
- Website type: Politics
- Available in: English
- Owners: Electoral Ventures, LLC
- Creator: Allan Keiter
- Website: 270towin.com
- Commercial: Yes
- Registration: No
- Launched: April 12, 2004; 22 years ago
- Current status: Online

270toWin is an American political website that provides interactive electoral maps and data for presidential, House of Representatives, Senate, and gubernatorial elections. It allows users to create their own electoral forecasts and offers historical election results, polling data, and projections from various political analysts.

== Overview ==
Launched on April 12, 2004, 270toWin derives its name from the number of electoral college votes required to win the U.S. presidency. The site is owned by Electoral Ventures, LLC, and was created by Allan Keiter. It operates as a commercial platform without requiring user registration.

== Features ==
=== Interactive maps ===
270toWin offers interactive maps for users to simulate election outcomes. These maps cover presidential, Senate, House, and gubernatorial races. Users can assign states or districts to different parties or candidates, allowing for customized electoral scenarios.

=== Historical election data ===
The website provides comprehensive historical data on U.S. presidential elections dating back to 1789. Each election includes an interactive map, results, and a synopsis of the race. Users can explore past elections and create "what-if" scenarios by altering historical outcomes.

=== Polling and forecasts ===
270toWin aggregates polling data and professional election projections. It features consensus forecasts compiled from multiple political analysts, providing users with a composite view of potential election outcomes.

=== Educational use ===
The platform is utilized in educational settings to teach students about the electoral process. Interactive maps and historical data serve as tools for understanding the dynamics of U.S. elections.
