= Results of the 2020 Green Party presidential primaries =

This article contains the results of the 2020 Green Party presidential primaries and caucuses, the processes by which the Green Party of the United States selects delegates to attend the 2020 Green National Convention.

== Results and calendar ==
Date (daily totals)	Total national delegates	Contest (Note: Alaska, Louisiana, Montana, New Hampshire, North Dakota, Rhode Island, South Dakota, Vermont, Wyoming, and all of the territories of the United States have inactive Green Parties, as such, they are either ineligible or unable to send delegates to the Green National Convention)	Delegates won and popular vote (Note: In the below table, blank cells indicate the candidate was not a ballot option or approved write-in candidate. Shaded cells indicate candidates that are not officially recognized by the Green Party.)										Source
Date (daily totals)	Total national delegates	Contest	Howie Hawkins	Dario Hunter	David Rolde	Sedinam Moyowasifza-Curry	Dennis Lambert	Kent Mesplay	Susan Buscher Lochocki	Jesse Ventura	Chad Wilson	No Preference Uncommitted Undeclared	Source
February 29	7	Ohio	3; 64 (42.95 %)	3; 51 (34.23%)	6 (4.03%)	6 (4.03%)	1; 13 (8.73%)	1 (0.67%)	2 (1.34%)		2 (1.34%)		
March 3 (Super Tuesday) (58)	43	California	16; 4,202 (36.2%)	9; 2,558 (22.0%)	3; 774 (6.7%)	8; 2,071 (17.8%)	7; 1,999 (17.2%)						
March 3 (Super Tuesday) (58)	11	Massachusetts	1; 217 (13.4%)	2; 224 (13.8%)	4 (0.2%)	1; 141 (8.7%)		55 (3.4%)				7; 979 (60.4%)	
March 3 (Super Tuesday) (58)	4	North Carolina	4; 247 (60.54%)									161 (39.46%)	
March 10	7	Missouri	2.5; 170 (33.27%)	1.5; 110 (21.52%)	1; 82 (16.05%)							2; 149 (29.16%)	
March 14	27	Illinois	20 (73%)	7 (27%)									
April 17	7	Colorado	4; 29 (63.3%)	2; 13 (28.3%)	1 (2.2%)	2 (4.3%)						1 N/A (Note: The number of delegates apportioned is calculated by the percentage of votes received. Votes not cast for a “surviving candidate” or a candidate that received less than 14% of total votes cast, become uncommitted. As a result a single delegate was awarded to uncommitted.) (9.0%)	
April 18	26	Texas	20; 40 (46.51%)	3; 16 (18.60%)	1 (1.16%)	3 (3.49%)	3 (3.49%)	2; 13 (15.12%)	1; 4 (4.65%)		1 (1.16%)	5 (5.81%)	
April 21	4	Wisconsin	2 (50.0%)	2 (47.0%)	(1.6%)	0 (0%)	0 (0%)	0 (0%)	0 (0%)		0 (0%)	0 (0%)	
April 25	4	New Mexico	3 N/A	1 N/A	0 (0%)	0 (0%)	0 (0%)	0 (0%)	0 (0%)		0 (0%)	0 (0%)	
April 26	5	Virginia	3.5; 44 (65.7%	1.5; 23 (34.3%)		eliminated in round 2/4		eliminated in round 3/4					
April 28 (15)	11	Pennsylvania	6; 80 (53.3%)	5; 62 (41.3%)	1 (0.7%)		1 (0.7%)					2 (1.3%)	
April 28 (15)	4	Utah	2; 22 (47.82%)	1; 17 (36.95%)	0 (0%)	0 (0%)	0 (0%)	0 (0%)	0 (0%)		0 (0%)	1; 7 (15.22%)	
May 2	4	South Carolina	4 (100%)	(0%)	(0%)	0 (0%)	0 (0%)	0 (0%)	0 (0%)		0 (0%)	0 (0%)	
May 3	4	Arkansas	4 (100%)	0 (0%)	0 (0%)	0 (0%)	0 (0%)	0 (0%)	0 (0%)		0 (0%)	0 (0%)	
May 5	4	Tennessee	2 N/A	1 N/A	.5; 0 (0%)	0 (0%)	0 (0%)	0 (0%)	0 (0%)		.5; 0 (0%)	0 (0%)	
May 6	5	New Jersey	5; 44 (78.6%)	4 (7.1%)	0 (0%)	2 (3.6%)	0 (0%)	1 (1.8%)	0 (0%)		0 (0%)		
May 9	21	New York	17 (80%)	4 (20%)	(0%)								
May 12	5	West Virginia	5 (78.3%)	(4.3%)	(8.7%)					(8.7%)			
May 17	4	Kansas	4 (100%)	(0%)	(0%)								
May 23 (10)	6	Arizona	3	2								1	
May 23 (10)	4	Hawaii	2; 4 (33.3%)	2; 5 (41.6%)			1 (8.3%)	1 (8.3%)			1 (8.3%)		
May 24	4	Young Ecosocialists	4; 51 (69.86%)	7 (9.59%)	0 (0%)					15 (20.55%)			
May 28	4 Exclude From Total	Rhode Island	Abstention (Note: The Green Party of Rhode Island announced they will not be placing any candidates on their ballot line in the 2020 Presidential Election. The party will also only send no-preference observers to the Green National Convention.)										
May 30 (25)	9	Florida	6; 78 (67.8%)	3; 26 (22.6%)	2 (1.7%)							9 (7.8%)	
May 30 (25)	4	Idaho		4									
May 30 (25)	8	Maryland	5; 34 (68.0%)	3; 16 (32.0%)		eliminated in round 1/4		eliminated in round 3/4				eliminated in round 1/4	
May 30 (25)	4	Mississippi	3	1									
June 2 (8)	4	District of Columbia	4 NA (NA)									NA (Note: No candidates were on the DC Statehood Green Party Presidential Primary ballot, only a Write-In option was available, and Howie Hawkins was the only certified write in candidate.)	
June 2 (8)	4 Exclude From Total	Montana										0; 350 (100%)	
June 6	7	Oregon (Note: This primary election was held through ranked choice voting, the following are the results of the final round in which delegates were allocated.)	3; 25 (42.0%)	2; 19 (32.0%)	eliminated in round 2/5	1; 10 (17.0%)	1; 3 (5.0%)	eliminated in round 3/5	eliminated in round 3/5		eliminated in round 4/5		
June 9	4	Nevada	4 (84.4%)	(3.1%)	(0%)							(12.5%)	
June 12	4	Indiana	1.5; 27 (43.5%)	1; 16 (25.81%)	0 (0%)	eliminated in round 2/3	eliminated in round 1/3	eliminated in round 1/3	eliminated in round 1/3	1; 19 (30.65%)	eliminated in round 1/3	.5; 49 (44.14%)	
June 12	12	Maine	3	6						1		2 (Note: 1 for No Candidate, and 1 Undeclared Delegate)	
June 13	5	Washington	2; 29 (44.6%)	3; 36 (55.4%)	eliminated in round 1/3	eliminated in round 1/3	eliminated in round 1/3	eliminated in round 1/3	eliminated in round 1/3	eliminated in round 2/3	eliminated in round 1/3	eliminated in round 2/3	
June 14 (15)	11	Connecticut	6 NA (NA)	3	NA					2			
June 14 (15)	3 (Note: As a result of the three way tie in the preference vote, the Nebraska Green Party decided to send only 3 delegates to the GNC, instead of the 4 delegates they were credentialed.)	Nebraska	1; 2 (33.33%)	1; 2 (33.33%)	0 (0%)							1; 2 (33.33%)	
June 19	0	Alaska	1 (14.3%)	1 (14.3%)		0; 5 (71.4%)							
June 20 (23)	4	Lavender Greens	2; 41 (51.2%)	2; 34 (42.5%)	2 (2.5%)	2 (2.5%)						1 (1.1%)	
June 20 (23)	15	Michigan	7; 48 (47.06)	3; 19 (18.63)	0 (0%)	.5; 2 (1.9%)	1 (>1%)	1 (>1%)	0 (0%)	3; 26 (36.1%)	1 (>1%)	1.5; 5 (6.9%)	
June 23	4	Women's Caucus	2 NA (NA)	2 NA (NA)									
June 24	4	Alabama	3; 4 (67%)	1; 2 (33%)									
June 28	4	Georgia	4; 12 (92.3%)	1 (7.69%)	0 (0%)								
June 29 (Note: The Green Party of Minnesota held a Presidential Preference Caucus Straw Poll on February 25th 2020. Dario Hunter was the winner of this contest. Delegates will be awarded at the GPMN state convention on June 29)	6	Minnesota	0; 0 (0 %)	6 NA (81.25)	0; 0 (0 %)	0; 0 (0 %)	0; 0 (0 %)	0; 0 (0 %)	0; 0 (0 %)	0; 0 (0 %)	0; 0 (0 %)	0; 0 (0 %)	
June 29	4	Latinx Caucus	NA (NA)	3 NA (NA)									
June 30	4	Delaware	1.5; NA (NA)	2.5; NA (NA)									
July 3	4	Kentucky	4; 5 (83.33%)	1 (16.67)	0 (0%)								
July 5	2	Louisiana (Note: The Louisiana Green Party decided to send only 2 delegates to the GNC, instead of the 4 delegates they were credentialed.)	1 NA (40%)			1 (60%)							
July 8	3	Oklahoma	1 NA (28.73%)	1 NA (34.48%)	½ NA (17.24%)							½ NA (18.54%)	
July 9	4	Black Caucus	2; 2 (50%)	2; 2 (50%)									
July 10	4	Iowa	1 NA (NA%)	2 NA (NA%)									
July 9–12	2020 Green National Convention												
Current awarded delegate total: 357 delegates out of 358 delegates.			205	98.5	5	11.5	9	2	1	7	½	17.5	

== Results by state ==
=== Minnesota caucus ===
The Green Party of Minnesota held its caucus (a non-binding straw poll which has no impact on choosing delegates) on February 25, 2020. Dario Hunter won the caucuses with 81.25% of the vote, however the delegates apportioned will be determined at the state convention in June.

The caucus used ranked-choice voting. However, Hunter won in the first round.

Minnesota Green Party presidential caucus, February 25, 2020
Candidate	Votes	Percentage	National delegates
Dario Hunter		81.25%	TBD
Others		18.75%	TBD
Total		100.00%	6

=== Ohio caucus ===
Ohio Green Party presidential caucus, February 29, 2020 – June 2, 2020 Partial Results of Feb. 29: Mail and Online Voting Continues Until June 2
Candidate	Votes	Percentage	National delegates
Howie Hawkins	64	42.95%	3
Dario Hunter	51	34.23%	3
Dennis Lambert	13	8.73%	1
Sedinam Moyowasifza Curry	6	4.03%	0
David Rolde	6	4.03%	0
Susan Lochocki	2	1.34%	0
Chad Wilson	2	1.34%	0
Kent Mesplay	1	0.67%	0
Total	145	100.00%	7

=== California primary ===
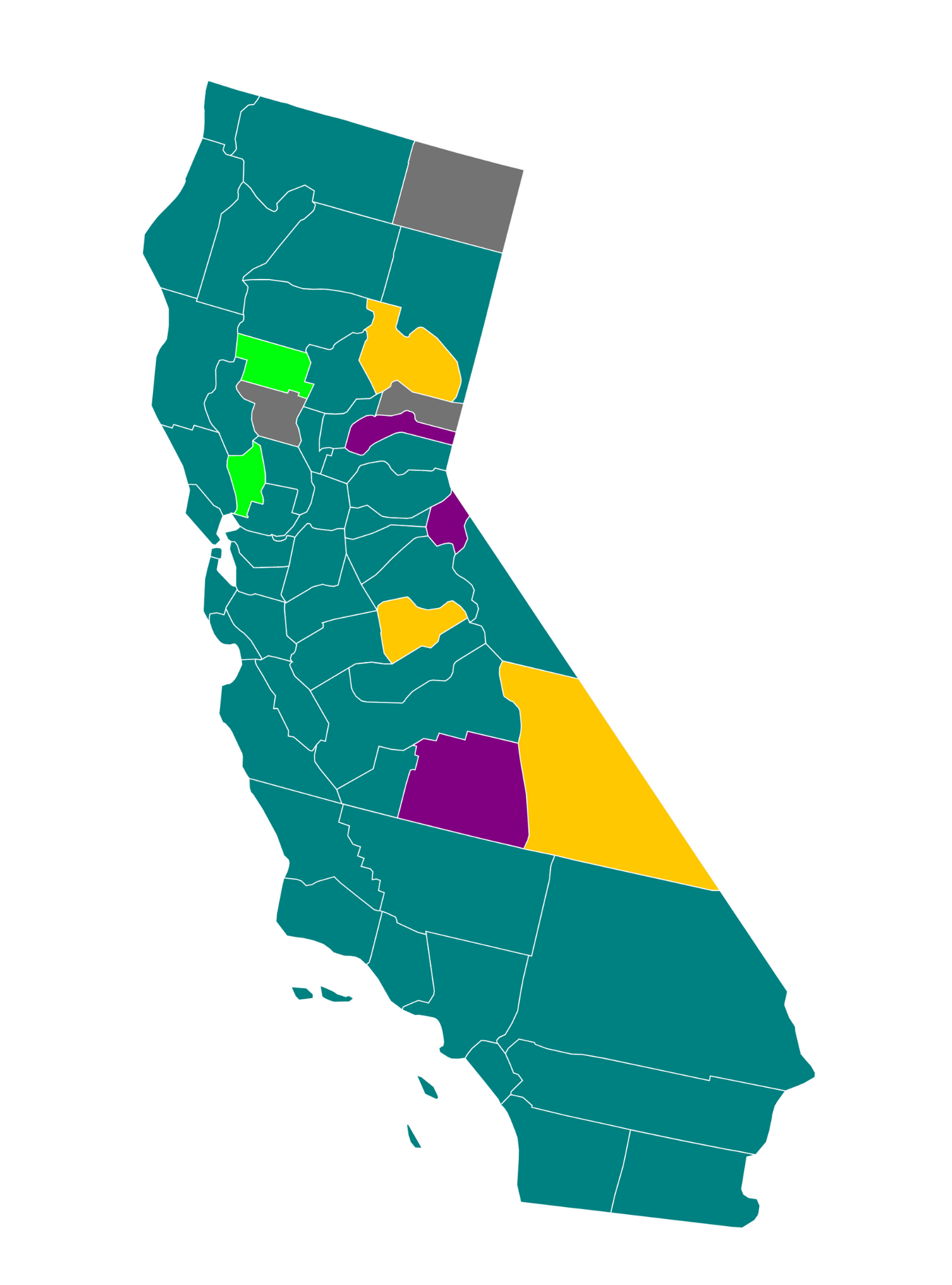
County results — California: Hawkins Hunter Curry / Lambert Tie

California Green Party presidential primary, March 3, 2020
Candidate	Votes	Percentage	National delegates
Howie Hawkins	4,202	36.2%	16 estimated
Dario Hunter	2,558	22.0%	9 estimated
Sedinam Moyowasifza-Curry	2,071	17.8%	8 estimated
Dennis Lambert	1,999	17.2%	7 estimated
David Rolde	774	6.7%	3 estimated
Total	9,656	100.00%	43

=== Massachusetts primary ===
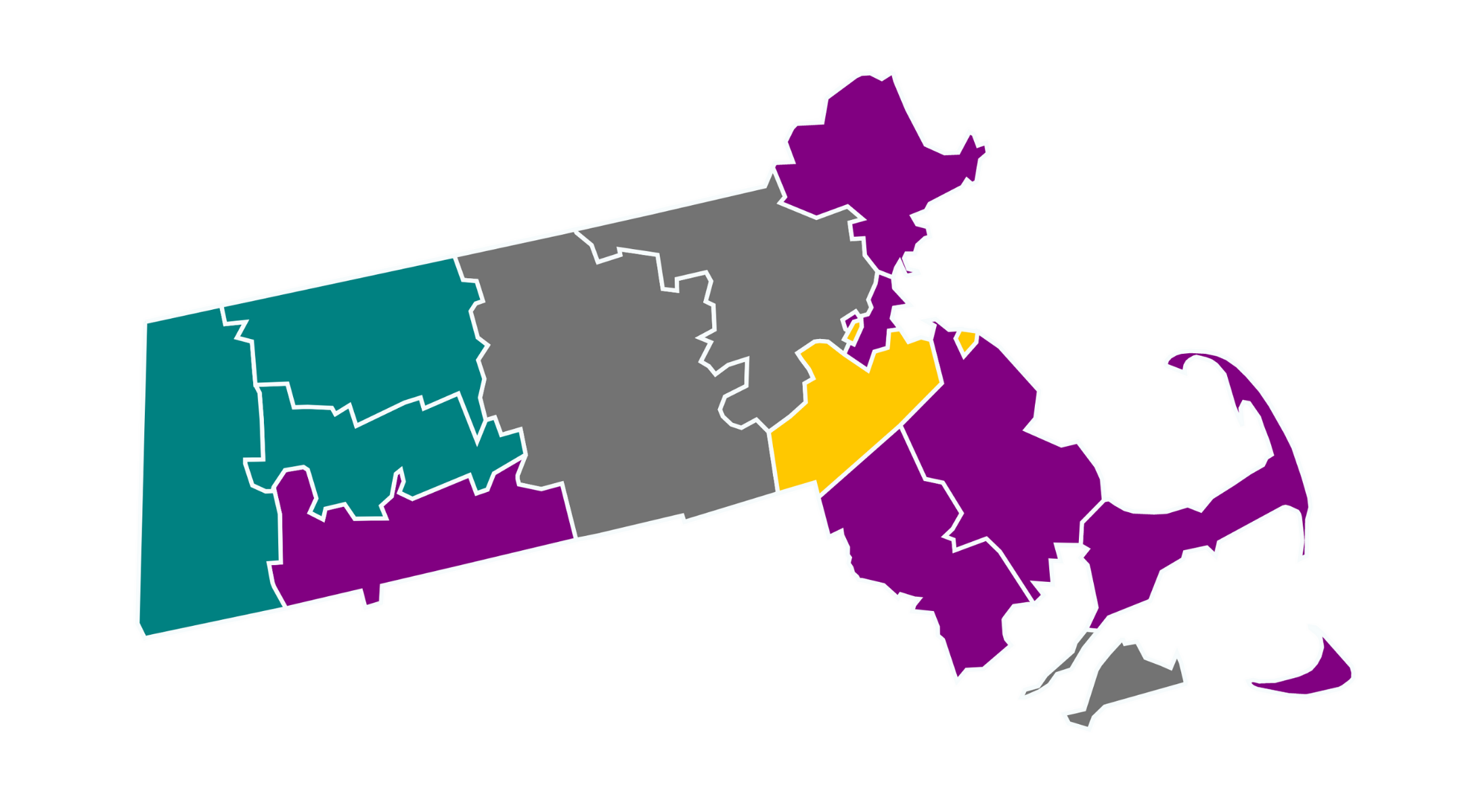
County results, excluding "No Preference" — Massachusetts.: Hunter Hawkins / Curry Tie

Massachusetts Green Party presidential primary, March 3, 2020 (Note: The Massachusetts Secretary of State officially declared Hunter the winner as he was the candidate with the most votes. Nonetheless, the 'no preference' votes exceeded the votes of all candidates.)
Candidate	Votes	Percentage	National delegates
No Preference (Blanks & Other Write-ins)	979	60.4	7 estimated
Dario Hunter	224	13.8	2 estimated
Howie Hawkins	217	13.4	1 estimated
Sedinam Kinamo Christin Moyowasifza-Curry	141	8.7	1 estimated
Kent Mesplay	55	3.4	0
David Rolde	4	0.2	0
Total	1620	100.00%	11

=== North Carolina primary ===
North Carolina Green Party presidential primary, March 3, 2020
Candidate	Votes	Percentage	National delegates
Howie Hawkins	247	60.54%	4
No Preference	161	39.46%	0
Total	408	100.00%	4

=== Missouri primary ===
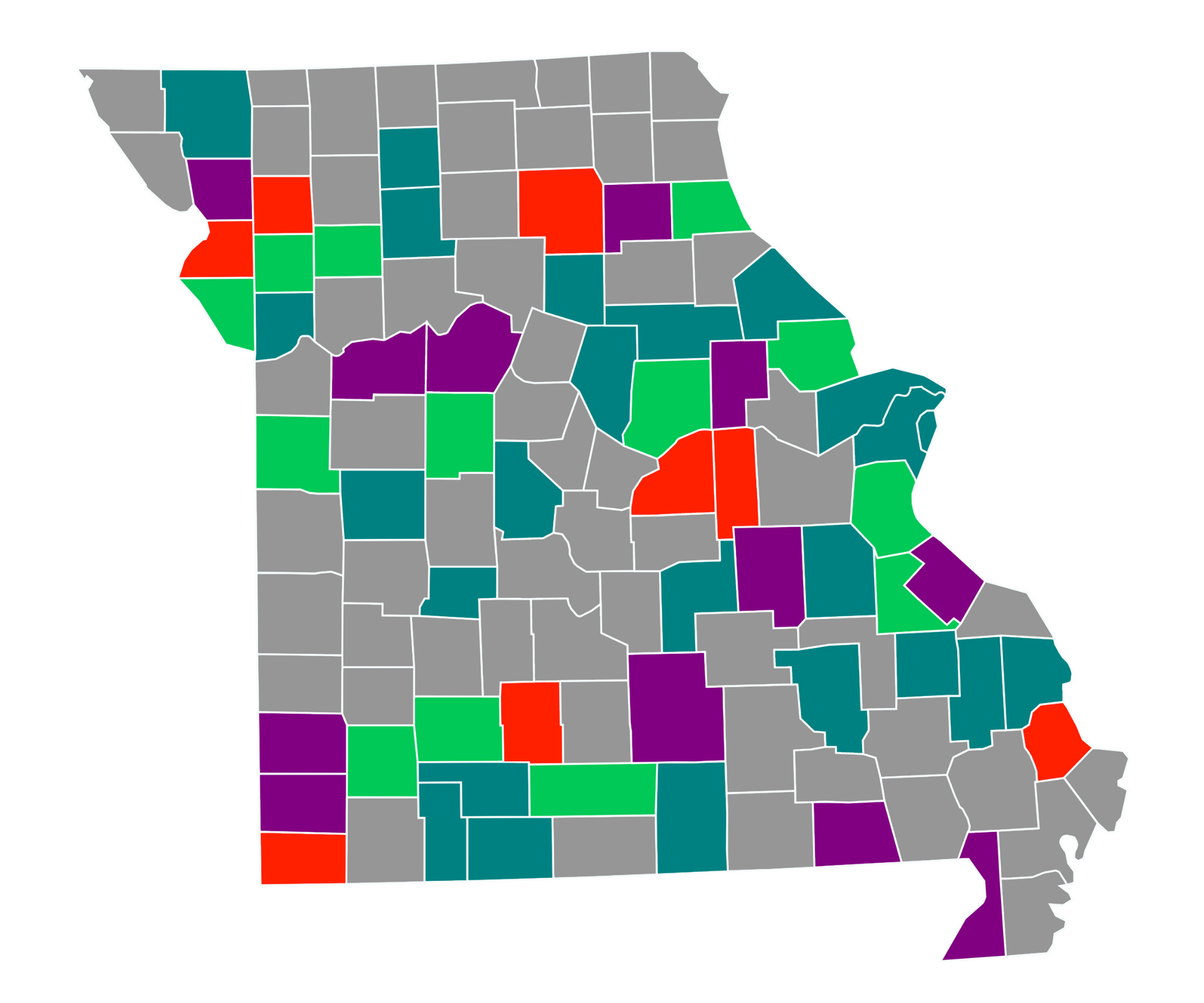
County results — Missouri.: Hawkins Uncommitted Hunter / Rolde Tie

Missouri Green Party presidential primary, March 10, 2020
Candidate	Votes	Percentage	National delegates
Howie Hawkins	170	33.27%	3 estimated
Uncommitted	149	29.16%	0
Dario Hunter	110	21.52%	2 estimated
David Rolde	82	16.05%	2 estimated
Total	511	100.00%	7

=== Illinois primary ===
Illinois Green Party presidential primary, March 14, 2020
Candidate	Votes	Percentage	National delegates
Howie Hawkins		73%	20
Dario Hunter		27%	7
Total		100.00%	27

=== Colorado primary ===
Colorado Green Party presidential primary, April 17, 2020
Candidate	Votes	Percentage	National delegates
Howie Hawkins	29	63.3%	4
Dario Hunter	13	28.3%	2
Sedinam Moyowasifza-Curry	2	4.3%	0
David Rolde	1	2.2%	0
Jill Stein (Write-in)	1	2.2%	0
Uncommitted	N/A (Note: The number of delegates apportioned is calculated by the percentage of votes received. Votes not cast for a “surviving candidate” or a candidate that received less than 14% of total votes cast, become uncommitted. As a result a single delegate was awarded to uncommitted.)	9.0%	1
Total	46	100.00%	7

=== Texas primary ===
The Green Party of Texas held a sequential proportional approval voting primary.

Texas Green Party presidential primary, April 18, 2020
Candidate	Votes (Note: This primary was conducted under a system in which each person approve of more than one candidate per ballot, therefore votes reflect total number of ballots that approved of the candidate, and as a result reflect more approvals than ballots cast.)	Percentage (Note: This primary was conducted under a system in which each person approve of more than one candidate per ballot, therefore percentages reflect the percentage of voters that approved of each candidate, and as a result do not add up to 100%.)	National delegates
Howie Hawkins	40	80.00%	20
Dario Hunter	16	32.00%	3
Kent Mesplay	13	26.00%	2
No Preference	5	10.00%	0
Susan Buchser-Lochocki	4	8.00%	1
Sedinam Moyowasifza-Curry	3	6.00%	0
Dennis Lambert	3	6.00%	0
Chad Wilson	1	2.00%	0
David Rolde	1	2.00%	0
Total	50 (Note: This primary was conducted under a system in which each person approve of more than one candidate per ballot, therefore total reflects the number of ballots cast, not the number of approvals on all ballots.)	140.00%	26

=== Virginia primary ===
The Green Party of Virginia held a ranked choice primary.

2020 Green Party of Virginia primary results, April 26, 2020
Candidate	Round 1		Round 2		Round 3		Round 4	
Candidate	Votes	%	Votes	%	Votes	%	Votes	%
Howie Hawkins	42	62.7%	42	62.7%	43	64.2%	44	65.7%
Dario Hunter	17	25.4%	18	26.9%	21	31.3%	23	34.3%
Kent Mesplay	3	4.5%	3	4.5%	3	4.5%	Eliminated	
Sedinam Moyowasiza-Curry	2	3.0%	2	3.0%	Eliminated			
Jill Stein (write-in)	2	3.0%	Eliminated					
Jesse Ventura (write-in)	1	1.5%	Eliminated					
Total votes							67	100.0%

=== Pennsylvania caucus ===
Pennsylvania Green Party presidential caucus, April 28, 2020
Candidate	Votes	Percentage	National delegates
Howie Hawkins	80	53.3%	6
Dario Hunter	62	41.3%	5
Jesse Ventura	2	1.3%	0
No Nominee	2	1.3%	0
Dennis Lambert	1	0.7%	0
David Rolde	1	0.7%	0
Bernie Sanders	1	0.7%	0
Jill Stein	1	0.7%	0
Total	150	100.00%	11

=== New Jersey primary ===
New Jersey Green Party presidential primary, May 2, 2020
Candidate	Votes	Percentage (Note: This primary was conducted under a system in which each person could cast a vote for more than one candidate, therefore percentages reflect the percentage of voters that approved of each candidate, and as a result do not add up to 100%.)	National delegates
Howie Hawkins	44	78.6%	5
Dario Hunter	4	7.1%	0
Jesse Ventura	3	5.4%	0
Sedinam Moyowasifza-Curry	2	3.6%	0
Bernie Sanders	2	3.6%	0
Kent Mesplay	1	1.8%	0
Susan Buchser-Lochocki	0	0%	0
Dennis Lambert	0	0%	0
Chad Wilson	0	0%	0
David Rolde	0	0%	0
Total	56	100.00%	5

=== South Carolina convention ===
South Carolina Green Party convention, May 2, 2020
Candidate	Percentage	National delegates
Howie Hawkins	100%	4
Others	0%	0
Total	100.00%	4

=== New York primary ===
New York Green Party presidential primary, May 9, 2020
Candidate	Votes	Percentage (Note: This primary was conducted under a system in which each person could cast a vote for more than one candidate, therefore percentages reflect the percentage of voters that approved of each candidate, and as a result do not add up to 100%.)	National delegates
Howie Hawkins	TBA	80%	17
Dario Hunter	TBA	20%	4
David Rolde	TBA	0%	0
Write-In	TBA	0%	0
Total	TBA	TBA	21

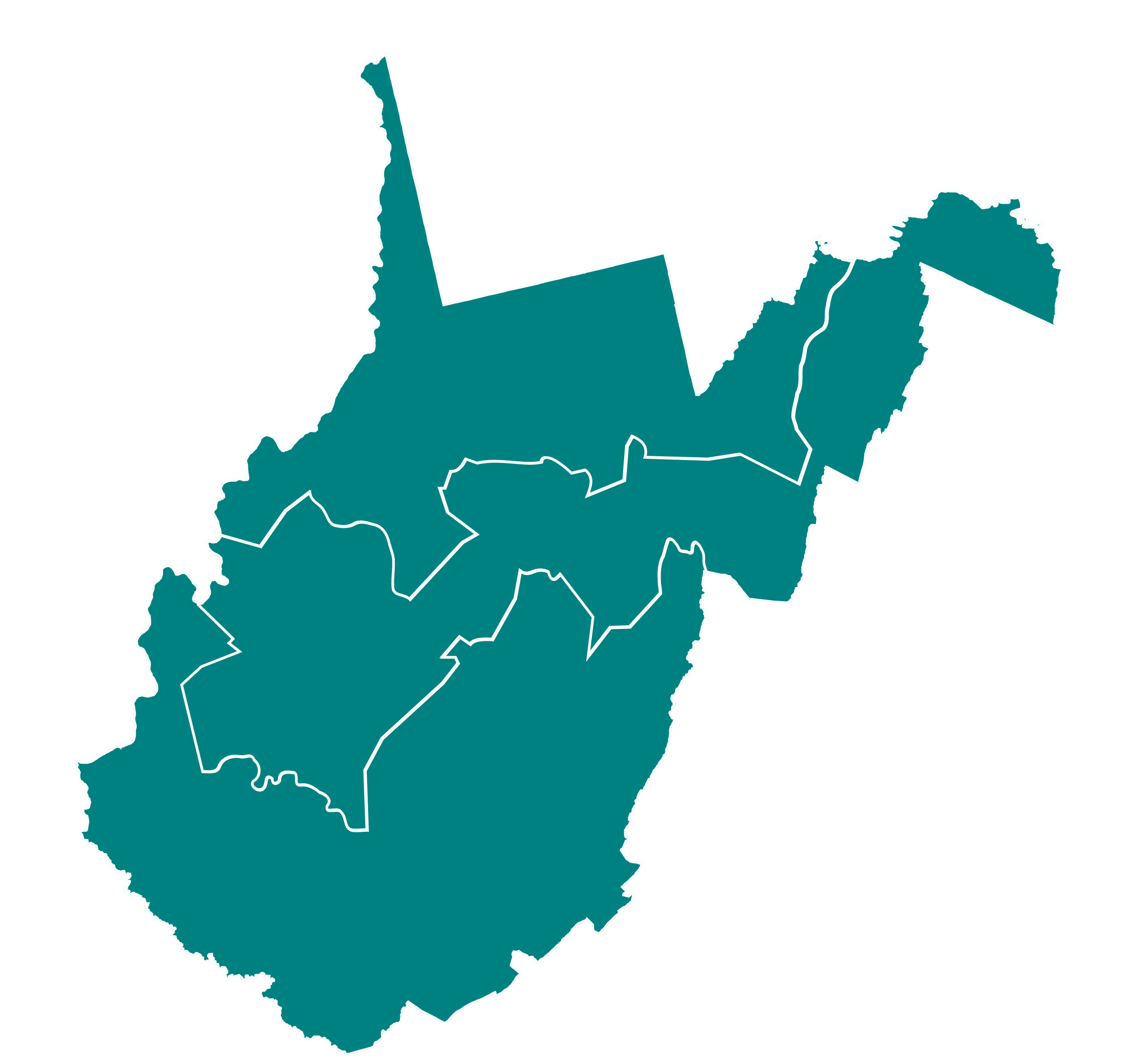
Congressional results — West Virginia. Hawkins

=== West Virginia primary ===
West Virginia Mountain (Green) Party presidential primary, May 12, 2020
Candidate	Percentage	National delegates
Howie Hawkins	78.3%	5
David Rolde	8.7%	0
Jesse Ventura (Write-in)	8.7%	0
Dario Hunter	4.3%	0
Total	100.00%	5

=== Hawaii primary ===
Green Party of Hawaii presidential primary, May 23, 2020
Candidate	Votes	Percentage	National delegates
Dario Hunter	5	41.6%	2
Howie Hawkins	4	33.3%	2
Kent Mesplay	1	8.3%	0
Dennis Lambert	1	8.3%	0
Chad Wilson	1	8.3%	0
Total	12	100.00%	4

=== Maryland primary ===
2020 Maryland Green Party primary results, May 30, 2020
Candidate	Round 1		Round 2		Round 3		Round 4	
Candidate	Votes	%	Votes	%	Votes	%	Votes	%
Howie Hawkins	34	53.1%	34	61.8%	34	64.15%	34	68%
Dario Hunters	16	25%	16	29.1%	16	30.18%	16	32%
Kent Mesplay	2	3.1%	3	5.5%	3	5.66%	Eliminated	
Write-ins	2	3.1%	2	3.6%	Eliminated			
Sedinam Moyowasiza-Curry	1	1.6%	Eliminated					
Empty ballot	9	14.1%	Eliminated					
Total votes							64	100.0%

== Results by caucus ==
=== Young Ecosocialists ===
Young Ecosocialists (youth caucus) presidential primary, May 25, 2020
Candidate	Votes	Percentage	National delegates
Howie Hawkins	51	69.9%	4
Jesse Ventura (write-in)	15	20.5%	0
Dario Hunter	7	9.6%	0
David Rolde	0	0.0%	0
Total	73	100.00%	4

== See also ==
- 2020 Green National Convention
- 2020 Green Party presidential primaries
- 2020 United States presidential election
