= Green Party of Rhode Island =

Rhode Island state level political party

- Founded: 1992; 34 years ago
- Headquarters: 37 Sixth Street Providence, RI 02906
- Ideology: Green politics Progressivism (US); Social democracy
- Political position: Left-wing
- National affiliation: Independent-Green Party US (2020–present); Green Party (2001–2020)
- Colors: Green
- Seats in the Upper House: 0 / 38
- Seats in the Lower House: 0 / 75

Website
- www.rigreens.org

The Green Party of Rhode Island (GPRI) is one of the oldest active Green parties in the United States. The party was founded on March 6, 1992, at a meeting of 40 activists from Rhode Island. In November 1996, GPRI was one of 12 founding parties in the Association of State Green Parties, renamed the Green Party of the United States in 2001. Several Rhode Island party leaders have served as officers of the national Green Party. The party's candidates have run for municipal councils in several cities and towns, such as running for Mayor of Providence, the State Senate and the State House of Representatives, U.S. Congress, and for Lieutenant governor.

== History ==
The Green Party of Rhode Island was founded by a meeting of 40 Green activists on March 6, 1992.

=== Campaign 1994 ===
In 1994, Green candidate Jeff Johnson of South Kingstown, Rhode Island gained about 6% of the vote in an election for lieutenant governor. To date, no statewide election has matched that vote share result for a Green candidate. Johnson also ran for State House of Representatives in 1996 and for Lieutenant governor again in 1998, receiving a lesser share of the vote.

=== Campaign 1996 and 2000 ===
In November 1996, GPRI was one of 12 founding parties in the Association of States Green Parties, renamed the Green Party of the United States in 2001.

In the 1996 and 2000 presidential elections, GPRI put Ralph Nader on the Rhode Island ballot for U.S. President, and Nader's vote share in 2000 (6.12%) was enough to win major party status for the GPRI.

=== Campaign 2004 ===
In June 2004 GPRI hosted a diplomatic visit by Miguel Angel Pimentel, President of the Green Party of Democratic Unity in the Dominican Republic. That same year the Green Party of the United States's presidential nominee, David Cobb, failed to win at least 5% in Rhode Island, and GPRI lost major party status.

=== Campaign 2008 ===
Former Georgia Congresswoman Cynthia McKinney attended the party's state convention in 2007, recruiting volunteers for her 2008 presidential campaign. McKinney won 6 of 8 Rhode Island delegates in the 2008 Green caucus in Rhode Island, but ultimately received less than 1% of the vote in the 2008 U.S. Presidential election in Rhode Island.

=== Campaign 2012 ===
In the 2012 Presidential election, the party supported Jill Stein's presidential candidacy. Stein and her running mate, Cheri Honkala, officially gained ballot access on September 13, 2012.

=== Campaign 2016 ===
In May 2016, the party nominated Jill Stein for President.

=== Campaign 2020 ===
In May 2020, the party decided to suspend its 2020 presidential campaign, due to the ongoing coronavirus pandemic and the state's refusal to relax in-person petitioning. Publicly, the party issued a press release about the importance of defeating Donald Trump, instead of supporting in party-lines via helping from the state Green Party's involvement for the Party's primary season. A group in support of the Hawkins–Walker 2020 presidential campaign filed a complaint with the national party’s Accreditation Committee while simultaneously gathering ballot petition signatures in Rhode Island.

The resulting controversy ultimately led the party to resign its affiliation with the Green Party of the United States, and return to its 1992 to 2001 status as an unaffiliated Green Party.

== See also ==
- Politics of Rhode Island
- Government of Rhode Island
- Elections in Rhode Island
- Political party strength in Rhode Island
- List of state Green Parties in the United States
- List of politics by U.S. state
