= 2020 Green Party presidential primaries =

- February 29 to July 10, 2020

358 delegates to the Green National Convention 180 delegates votes needed to win
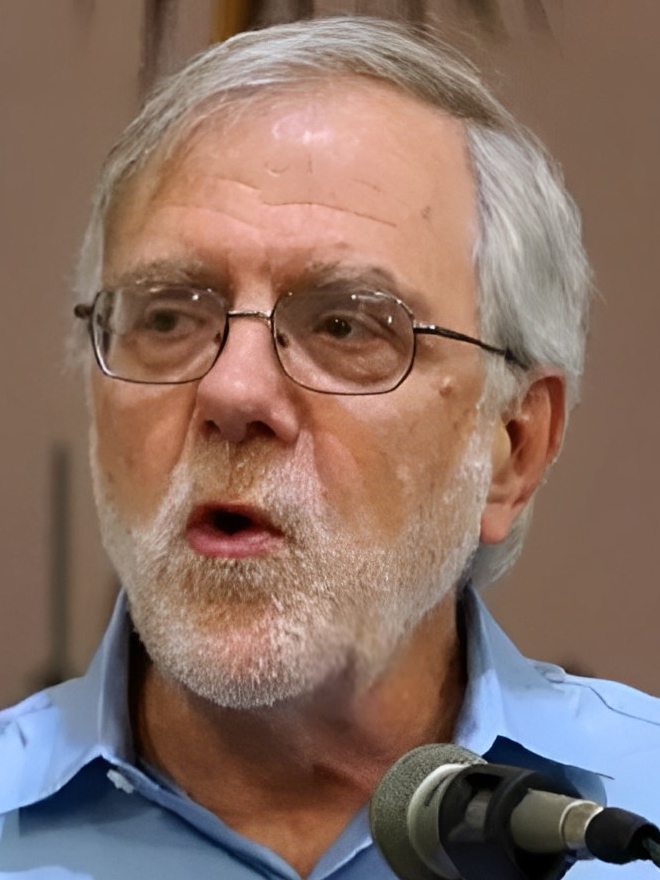

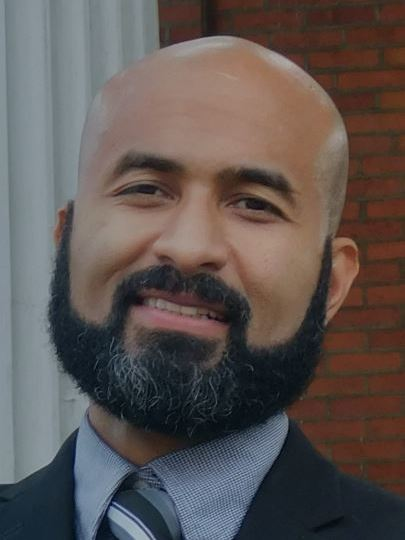

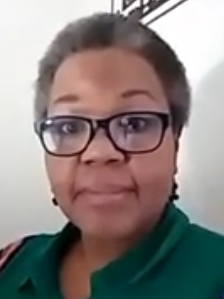

Candidate	Howie Hawkins	Dario Hunter	Uncommitted
Home state	New York	California	n/a
Delegate count	205	98.5	17.5 (Note: This total excludes delegates from the Green Party of Rhode Island, as they have chosen not to send a voting delegation to the Green National Convention.)
Contests won	35	11	3 (Note: Hunter received the most votes of any candidate and was declared the winner by the MA Secretary of State in that state’s primary. The no preference option received the most votes overall.) (Note: The Green Party of Rhode Island have announced they will not be placing any candidates on their ballot line in the 2020 Presidential Election. The party only sent no-preference observers to the Green National Convention.)
Popular vote	5,182 (Note: Total votes is based on incomplete data, as many states have not released popular vote totals for primaries, caucuses, and state conventions.)	3,087	1,662
Percentage	34.7%	20.7%	8.8%
Candidate	Sedinam Moyowasifza-Curry	Dennis Lambert	David Rolde
Home state	California	Ohio	Massachusetts
Delegate count	11.5	9	5
Contests won	2	0	0
Popular vote	2,229	2,029	960
Percentage	15.3%	13.9%	6.5%

Howie Hawkins
Dario Hunter
Sedinam Moyowasifza-Curry
No Preference
No Contest
Previous Green nominee
Jill Stein
Green nominee
Howie Hawkins

The 2020 Green Party presidential primaries were a series of primary elections, caucuses and state conventions in which voters elected delegates to represent a candidate for the Green Party's nominee for President of the United States at the 2020 Green National Convention. The primaries, were held in numerous U.S. states on various dates from early spring into early summer of 2020, and featured elections publicly funded, concurrent with the Democratic Party and Republican Party primaries, and elections privately funded by the Green Party, held non-concurrently with the major party primaries.

There were 357 out of a possible 358 delegates elected to the Green National Convention, which took place over July 9 to July 12. A candidate needed a simple majority of these delegates to become the Green Party's nominee in the 2020 presidential election.

Howie Hawkins became the presumptive nominee on June 20 after passing the simple majority of delegates needed to win the nomination. Hawkins was nominated as the Green Party's presidential candidate on July 11.

== Background ==
=== Former nominees ===
The former Green Party presidential nominees, in chronological order, are consumer advocate Ralph Nader, political activist David Cobb, congresswoman Cynthia McKinney, and political activist Jill Stein. Both Nader and Stein received the nomination for president twice from the Green Party. The former vice presidential nominees of the Green Party are environmentalist and economist Winona LaDuke, political activist Pat LaMarche, organizer and hip-hop activist Rosa Clemente, National Coordinator of the Poor People's Economic Human Rights Campaign Cheri Honkala, and human rights activist Ajamu Baraka. In 2016, LaDuke became the first Native American woman and Green Party member to receive an Electoral College vote for vice president.

The vice presidential nominees from the preceding 2016 and 2012 elections, Baraka and Honkala respectively, endorsed Howie Hawkins for president.

== Candidates ==
This section lists candidates that have at some point been considered active by the party's Presidential Campaign Support Committee. Holding an active status does not mean the candidate has received official recognition from the party.

On July 24, 2019, the Green Party of the United States officially recognized Howie Hawkins' campaign. Nearly a month later, Dario Hunter's campaign was also recognized. In February 2020, David Rolde's campaign met the requirements for recognition.

The remaining candidates did not obtain formal recognition by meeting the established criteria by the party's Presidential Campaign Support Committee.

Popular vote counts presented here are incomplete, as many states have reported their delegates but not the corresponding popular vote.

=== Candidates ===
Gained delegates as write-in but did not officially declare candidacy

Candidate	Experience	Home	Campaign Announced	Campaign Suspended	Popular Vote	Pledged delegates 176 delegate votes needed to win	Contests won (Note: Popular vote victories)	Article	Ref
Officially recognized candidates (Note: The Green Party of the United States established a base criteria in order to be considered an official candidate for the party's presidential nomination. This base criteria requires perspective candidates to gather at least 100 signatures from Party members, fundraising at least a total of five thousand dollars from party members in multiple states, filing with the FEC, completing a questionnaire provided by the Party, and joining a local Green Party. Official recognition is required to receive the party's nomination.)
Howie Hawkins	Co-founder of the Green Party (1984); Socialist Party USA nominee for president in 2020; Nominee for Governor of New York in 2010, 2014, 2018	New York	Exploratory committee: April 3, 2019; Campaign: May 28, 2019	Received nomination	5,235 (35.5%)	205 / 358 (58.57%)	34 (AL, AR, AZ, CA, CO, CT, DC, FL, GA, IL, IN, KS, KY, MI, MD, MO, MS, NC, NJ, NM, NV, NY, OH, OK, OR, PA, SC, TN, TX, UT, VA, WI, WV, LAV, YES)	Campaign; FEC filing Running mate: Angela Walker	
Dario Hunter	Youngstown Board of Education member (2016–2020)	California	Exploratory committee: January 21, 2019; Campaign: February 18, 2019	June 11, 2020 (Ran as a Progressive)	3,107 (20.7%)	98.5 / 358 (28.14%)	11 (DE, HI, IA, ID, MA, ME, MN, OK, WA, LTX, WCS)	FEC filing Campaign; Running mate: Darlene Elias	
David Rolde	Co-chair of the Greater Boston Chapter of the Green-Rainbow Party	Massachusetts	Campaign: July 14, 2019	June 11, 2020	960 (6.5%)	5 / 358 (1.57%)	0	FEC filing	
Other Candidates
Sedinam Moyowasifza-Curry	Activist; Candidate for President in 2016	California	Campaign: July 29, 2015	June 11, 2020 (Ran for Vice-President with Mark Charles)	2,231 (15.3%)	11.5 / 358 (3%)	2 AK, LA	FEC filing	
Dennis Lambert	Documentary filmmaker Candidate for U.S. representative from OH-15 in 2016; Nominee for U.S. representative from OH-06 in 2014	Ohio	Campaign: May 10, 2019	June 11, 2020	2,030 (13.9%)	9 / 358 (2.57%)	0	FEC filing	
Jesse Ventura	Governor of Minnesota (1999–2003); Mayor of Brooklyn Park (1991–1995)	Minnesota	No campaign	No campaign	23	7 / 358 (2.29%)	0	No candidacy	
Kent Mesplay	Inspector at the Air Pollution Control District of San Diego County (2001–present); Candidate for President in 2008, 2012 and 2016	California	Campaign: December 14, 2019	June 11, 2020	72 (0.5%)	3 / 358 (0.86%)	0	FEC filing	
Susan Buchser Lochocki	Businesswoman	Zürich, Switzerland	Campaign: November 12, 2019	June 11, 2020	6 (0.04%)	1 / 358 (0.29%)	0	FEC filing	
Chad Wilson	Podcaster	Tennessee	Campaign: September 8, 2019	June 11, 2020	5 (0.02%)	.5 / 358 (0.14%)	0	FEC filing	
Alternate ballot options
Uncommitted / None of the Above					1,662 (8.8%)	17.5 / 358 (4.1%)	3 (MA, MT); RI Excluded		

=== Withdrew before the primaries ===
Candidate	Experience	Home state	Campaign announced	Campaign suspended	Ref
Ian Schlakman	Former co-chair of the Maryland Green Party; Nominee for Governor of Maryland in 2018; Nominee for U.S. representative from MD-02 in 2014	Maryland	December 3, 2018	October 18, 2019	
Alan Augustson	Public policy analyst Candidate for U.S. representative from IL-05 in 2009; Nominee for U.S. representative from IL-05 in 2008	New Mexico	April 6, 2019	June 10, 2019 (endorsed Hunter)	

=== Declined to be candidates ===
The following individuals were the subject of speculation as being possible candidates, but publicly denied interest in running.

- Darryl Cherney, musician and environmental activist; Green candidate for president in 2016
- Jill Stein, Lexington Town Meeting member 2005–2010; Green nominee for president in 2012 and 2016; Green nominee for Governor of Massachusetts in 2002 and 2010
- Jesse Ventura, Governor of Minnesota (1999–2003); Mayor of Brooklyn Park, Minnesota (1991–1995)

== Debates ==
Sites of the Green presidential debates

The Green Party's Presidential Campaign Support Committee (PCSC) hosted a presidential forum on July 26 during the party's 2019 Annual National Meeting. All other debates and forums were organized by state Green Parties and caucuses.

=== Schedule ===
No.	Date	Time (ET)	Place	Sponsor(s)	Moderators	Ref
1	July 19, 2019	5:00–7:00 p.m.	Dayton's Bluff Rec. Center; Saint Paul, Minnesota	Green Party of Minnesota	Danielle Swift, St. Paul City Council candidate	
2	July 26, 2019	6:30–8:30 p.m.	Salem State University; Salem, Massachusetts	GPUS Presidential Campaign Support Committee	Dr. Jill Stein; Margaret Kimberley, journalist	
3	August 11, 2019	9:15–11:00 a.m.	Coyote's Adobe Cafe; Springfield, Missouri	Missouri Green Party	Ron Burch, Master of Ceremonies	
4	September 20, 2019	6:00–8:00 p.m.	Ball State University; Muncie, Indiana	GPUS Black Caucus	Robin Harris and Trahern Crews, Masters of Ceremonies	
5	October 19, 2019	3:30–5:00 p.m.	Gem Center for the Arts; Boise, Idaho	Green Party of Idaho	Jayson Prettyboy of Indigenous Idaho Alliance	
6	December 7, 2019	3:30–5:00 p.m.	Revue Coffee Bar; Fresno, California	Green Party of California	Not Safe For Wonks Podcast	
7	March 4, 2020	3:00–11:00 p.m.	Hilton Chicago; Chicago, Illinois	Free & Equal Elections Foundation	Christina Tobin	
8	May 5, 2020	N/A	Online	Green Ballot	Jackson Hinkle	
9	May 8, 2020	8:30-10:00 p.m.	Online	Indiana Green Party	Elliott Crow	

=== Participation ===
Debates among candidates for the 2020 Green Party U.S. presidential nomination
Date	State	Host	Participants								
P Participant. A Absent. O Out of race (exploring, suspended, or not yet entered)			Curry	Hawkins	Hunter	Lambert	Lochocki	Mesplay	Rolde	Schlakman	Wilson
July 19, 2019	Minnesota	Green Party of Minnesota	P	P	P	A	O	O	P	P	O
July 26, 2019	Massachusetts	GPUS Presidential Campaign Support Committee	P	P	P	P	O	O	P	P	O
August 11, 2019	Missouri	Missouri Green Party	A	P	P	P	O	O	P	A	O
September 20, 2019	Indiana	GPUS Black Caucus	A	P	P	P	O	O	P	P	P
October 19, 2019	Idaho	Green Party of Idaho	P	P	P	P	O	O	P	P	P
December 7, 2019	California	Green Party of California	P	P	P	P	A	O	P	O	P
March 4, 2020	Illinois	Free & Equal Elections Foundation	P	P	A	A	A	A	A	O	A
May 5, 2020	Online	Green Ballot	P	A	A	A	A	P	A	O	P
May 8, 2020	Online	Indiana Green Party	P	P	P	P	P	A	P	O	P

== Timeline ==
Active campaigns
Exploratory committee
Withdrawn candidate
Midterm elections
Super Tuesday
National emergency declared due to COVID-19
Final primaries
Green convention
General election

=== 2018 ===
- December 14: Former Maryland Green Party co-chair Ian Schlakman became the first Green Party candidate filed with the FEC to announce their presidential bid for the 2020 election, the first presidential election he qualified for.

=== 2019 ===
- January 17: Howie Hawkins answered questions on public "Green Party Power Project" conference call on the Green New Deal, during this he announced that he was considering a run for the Green Party nomination
- January 21: Rabbi and Youngstown Board of Education member Dario Hunter (then) of Ohio formed an exploratory committee.
- February 18: Dario Hunter officially announced his campaign and filed his candidacy with the FEC.
- April 3: Howie Hawkins formed an exploratory committee.
- May 10: U.S. Army Veteran Dennis Lambert announced his campaign.
- May 28: Hawkins formally launched his campaign.
- June 4: Howie Hawkins filed his candidacy with the FEC
- July 14: David Rolde announced his campaign.
- July 19: The Green Party of Minnesota hosted the first green primary debate.
- July 26: The second Green Party debate took place in Salem, Massachusetts.
- July 29: Sedinam Moyowasifza-Curry announced her campaign.
- August 8: Moyowasifza-Curry filed her candidacy with the FEC.
- August 9: Dennis Lambert filed his candidacy with the FEC.
- August 11: The third Green Party debate took place in Springfield, Missouri.
- August 18: The Green National Committee decides to hold the 2020 Green National Convention in Detroit, Michigan on July 9–12.
- August 19: Dennis Lambert filed his candidacy with the FEC.
- August 27: David Rolde filed his candidacy with the FEC.
- September 8: Chad Wilson announced his campaign.
- September 20: The fourth Green Party debate took place in Muncie, Indiana.
- October 18: Schlakman suspends his campaign over disputes with the Green Party
- October 19: The fifth Green Party debate took place in Boise, Idaho.
- December 7: The sixth Green Party debate took place in Fresno, California.
- December 11: Chad Wilson filed his candidacy with the FEC.
- December 14: Kent Mesplay announces his campaign.

=== 2020 ===
- February 25: Hunter won Minnesota caucus.
- February 25: Hawkins won Ohio.
- March 3: Super Tuesday: Hawkins won California and North Carolina; Hunter is the winning candidate in a close race in Massachusetts (as declared by the MA Secretary of State), the no preference option received the most popular votes. Hunter announces Darlene Elias, parole officer and former Green Party Co-chair, as his running mate.
- March 4: Howie Hawkins and Sedinam Moyowasifza-Curry take part in the Free & Equal elections debate held in Chicago.
- March 10: Hawkins won Missouri.
- March 14: Hawkins won Illinois.
- April 14: Jesse Ventura submits his interest in running for president under the Green Party to the Presidential Campaign Support Committee.
- April 17: Hawkins won Colorado.
- April 18: Hawkins won Texas.
- April 21: Hawkins won Wisconsin at popular vote, but at tie with Hunter at delegates.
- April 25: Hawkins won New Mexico.
- April 28: Hawkins won Pennsylvania and Utah.
- May 2: Hawkins won South Carolina.
- May 3: Hawkins won Arkansas. Hawkins declared winner of Pennsylvania.
- May 5: Hawkins won Tennessee and announced Angela Walker as his running mate.
- May 12: Hawkins won West Virginia.
- May 16: Hawkins won New York.
- May 17: Hawkins won Kansas.
- May 23: Hunter won Hawaii. Washington primary TBA.
- May 24: Hawkins won the Young Ecosocialists (YES) primary.
- May 28: The Green Party of Rhode Island announces they will not endorse nor provide any ballot access efforts for any Green Party candidate in the 2020 election.
- May 30: Hawkins won Florida, Maryland, and Mississippi primaries. Hunter won Idaho.
- June 2: Hawkins won the District of Columbia as Montana votes no preference for their candidate.
- June 6: Hawkins won Oregon.
- June 9: Hawkins won Nevada.
- June 12: Hunter won Maine.
- June 12: Hawkins won Indiana.
- June 14: Hawkins won Connecticut.
- June 19: The Alaska Green Party endorses Sedinam Curry for President, and commits their delegates to her, despite not registering for the Green National Convention.
- June 20: Hawkins won Michigan and the Lavender Greens primary.

== Ballot access ==
Filing for the primaries began in October 2019. indicates that the candidate is on the ballot for the upcoming primary contest, indicates that the candidate is a recognized write-in candidate, and indicates that the candidate will not appear on the ballot in that state's contest. Blanks indicate that a candidate is not yet known to be on the ballot but a final list of candidates eligible to appear on the ballot is not yet available. States that have not yet announced any candidates who are on the ballot are not included. The requirements to gain ballot access are determined either by the state government or the state party, depending on local election law.

Primaries and Caucuses
State/ Territory	Date	Curry	Hawkins	Hunter	Lambert	Mesplay	Rolde	Wilson	Lochocki	Ref
MN	Feb 25	Ballot access not required								
OH	Feb 29	Moyowasifza-Curry-Yes	Hawkins-Yes	Hunter-Yes	Lambert-Yes	Maybe	Rolde-Yes	Maybe	Maybe	
CA	Mar 3	Moyowasifza-Curry-Yes	Hawkins-Yes	Hunter-Yes	Lambert-Yes	Mesplay-No	Rolde-Yes	Wilson-No	Other-No	
MA	Mar 3	Yes	Yes	Yes	No	Yes	Maybe	No	No	
NC	Mar 3	Moyowasifza-Curry-No	Hawkins-Yes	Hunter-No	Lambert-No	Mesplay-No	Rolde-No	Wilson-No	Other-No	
MO	Mar 10	No	Hawkins-Yes	Hunter-Yes	No	No	Rolde-Yes	No	No	
PA	Apr 28	Maybe	Hawkins-Yes	Hunter-Yes	Maybe	Maybe	Rolde-Yes	Maybe	Maybe	
WV	May 12	Maybe	Hawkins-Yes	Hunter-Yes	Maybe	Maybe	Rolde-Yes	Maybe	Maybe	
WA	May 23	Maybe	Hawkins-Yes	Hunter-Yes	Maybe	Maybe	Rolde-Yes	Maybe	Maybe	
HI	May 23	Moyowasifza-Curry-Yes	Hawkins-Yes	Hunter-Yes	Lambert-Yes	Mesplay-Yes	Rolde-Yes	Wilson-Yes	Lochoki-Yes	
YES	May 24	Maybe	Hawkins-Yes	Hunter-Yes	Maybe	Maybe	Rolde-Yes	Maybe	Maybe	
RI	May 28	Abstention								
FL	May 30	Maybe	Hawkins-Yes	Hunter-Yes	Maybe	Maybe	Rolde-Yes	Maybe	Maybe	
MD	May 30	Moyowasifza-Curry-Yes	Hawkins-Yes	Hunter-Yes	Lambert-Yes	Mesplay-Yes	Rolde-Yes	Wilson-Yes	Lochoki-Yes	
DC	Jun 2	Maybe	Maybe	Maybe	Maybe	Maybe	Maybe	Maybe	Maybe	
MT	Jun 2	Only No Preference On Ballot								
IN	Jun 12	Moyowasifza-Curry-Yes	Moyowasifza-Curry-Yes	Moyowasifza-Curry-Yes	Moyowasifza-Curry-Yes	Moyowasifza-Curry-Yes	Moyowasifza-Curry-Yes	Moyowasifza-Curry-Yes	Moyowasifza-Curry-Yes	

== Endorsements ==
Dario Hunter

Local officials

- Dave Ochmanowicz, member of the Quakertown Community School Board

Individuals

- Alan Augustson, public policy analyst from New Mexico; withdrawn Green candidate for President in 2020
- Austin Bashore, Green Party candidate for Ohio House of Representatives for District 75 in 2018.

International politicians

- Alex Tyrrell, leader of the Green Party of Quebec
Jesse Ventura

Individuals

- George Galloway, Member of Parliament (MP) for Rochdale and former British Labour and Respect Party MP, radio and television host
- Jimmy Dore, American comedian, talk show host and political commentator

== Schedule and results ==
Date (daily totals)	Total national delegates	Contest (Note: Alaska, Louisiana, Montana, New Hampshire, North Dakota, Rhode Island, South Dakota, Vermont, Wyoming, and all of the territories of the United States have inactive Green Parties, as such, they are either ineligible or unable to send delegates to the Green National Convention)	Delegates won and popular vote (Note: In the below table, blank cells indicate the candidate was not a ballot option or approved write-in candidate. Shaded cells indicate candidates that are not officially recognized by the Green Party.)										Source
Date (daily totals)	Total national delegates	Contest	Howie Hawkins	Dario Hunter	David Rolde	Sedinam Moyowasifza-Curry	Dennis Lambert	Kent Mesplay	Susan Buscher Lochocki	Jesse Ventura	Chad Wilson	No Preference Uncommitted Undeclared	Source
February 29	7	Ohio	3; 64 (42.95 %)	3; 51 (34.23%)	6 (4.03%)	6 (4.03%)	1; 13 (8.73%)	1 (0.67%)	2 (1.34%)		2 (1.34%)		
March 3 (Super Tuesday) (58)	43	California	16; 4,202 (36.2%)	9; 2,558 (22.0%)	3; 774 (6.7%)	8; 2,071 (17.8%)	7; 1,999 (17.2%)						
March 3 (Super Tuesday) (58)	11	Massachusetts	1; 217 (13.4%)	2; 224 (13.8%)	4 (0.2%)	1; 141 (8.7%)		55 (3.4%)				7; 979 (60.4%)	
March 3 (Super Tuesday) (58)	4	North Carolina	4; 247 (60.54%)									161 (39.46%)	
March 10	7	Missouri	2.5; 170 (33.27%)	1.5; 110 (21.52%)	1; 82 (16.05%)							2; 149 (29.16%)	
March 14	27	Illinois	20 (73%)	7 (27%)									
April 17	7	Colorado	4; 29 (63.3%)	2; 13 (28.3%)	1 (2.2%)	2 (4.3%)						1 N/A (Note: The number of delegates apportioned is calculated by the percentage of votes received. Votes not cast for a “surviving candidate” or a candidate that received less than 14% of total votes cast, become uncommitted. As a result a single delegate was awarded to uncommitted.) (9.0%)	
April 18	26	Texas	20; 40 (46.51%)	3; 16 (18.60%)	1 (1.16%)	3 (3.49%)	3 (3.49%)	2; 13 (15.12%)	1; 4 (4.65%)		1 (1.16%)	5 (5.81%)	
April 21	4	Wisconsin	2 (50.0%)	2 (47.0%)	(1.6%)	0 (0%)	0 (0%)	0 (0%)	0 (0%)		0 (0%)	0 (0%)	
April 25	4	New Mexico	3 N/A	1 N/A	0 (0%)	0 (0%)	0 (0%)	0 (0%)	0 (0%)		0 (0%)	0 (0%)	
April 26	5	Virginia	3.5; 44 (65.7%	1.5; 23 (34.3%)		eliminated in round 2/4		eliminated in round 3/4					
April 28 (15)	11	Pennsylvania	6; 80 (53.3%)	5; 62 (41.3%)	1 (0.7%)		1 (0.7%)					2 (1.3%)	
April 28 (15)	4	Utah	2; 22 (47.82%)	1; 17 (36.95%)	0 (0%)	0 (0%)	0 (0%)	0 (0%)	0 (0%)		0 (0%)	1; 7 (15.22%)	
May 2	4	South Carolina	4 (100%)	(0%)	(0%)	0 (0%)	0 (0%)	0 (0%)	0 (0%)		0 (0%)	0 (0%)	
May 3	4	Arkansas	4 (100%)	0 (0%)	0 (0%)	0 (0%)	0 (0%)	0 (0%)	0 (0%)		0 (0%)	0 (0%)	
May 5	4	Tennessee	2 N/A	1 N/A	.5; 0 (0%)	0 (0%)	0 (0%)	0 (0%)	0 (0%)		.5; 0 (0%)	0 (0%)	
May 6	5	New Jersey	5; 44 (78.6%)	4 (7.1%)	0 (0%)	2 (3.6%)	0 (0%)	1 (1.8%)	0 (0%)		0 (0%)		
May 9	21	New York	17 (80%)	4 (20%)	(0%)								
May 12	5	West Virginia	5 (78.3%)	(4.3%)	(8.7%)					(8.7%)			
May 17	4	Kansas	4 (100%)	(0%)	(0%)								
May 23 (10)	6	Arizona	3	2								1	
May 23 (10)	4	Hawaii	2; 4 (33.3%)	2; 5 (41.6%)			1 (8.3%)	1 (8.3%)			1 (8.3%)		
May 24	4	Young Ecosocialists	4; 51 (69.86%)	7 (9.59%)	0 (0%)					15 (20.55%)			
May 28	4 Exclude From Total	Rhode Island	Abstention (Note: The Green Party of Rhode Island announced they will not be placing any candidates on their ballot line in the 2020 Presidential Election. The party will also only send no-preference observers to the Green National Convention.)										
May 30 (25)	9	Florida	6; 78 (67.8%)	3; 26 (22.6%)	2 (1.7%)							9 (7.8%)	
May 30 (25)	4	Idaho		4									
May 30 (25)	8	Maryland	5; 34 (68.0%)	3; 16 (32.0%)		eliminated in round 1/4		eliminated in round 3/4				eliminated in round 1/4	
May 30 (25)	4	Mississippi	3	1									
June 2 (8)	4	District of Columbia	4 NA (NA)									NA (Note: No candidates were on the DC Statehood Green Party Presidential Primary ballot, only a Write-In option was available, and Howie Hawkins was the only certified write in candidate.)	
June 2 (8)	4 Exclude From Total	Montana										0; 350 (100%)	
June 6	7	Oregon (Note: This primary election was held through ranked choice voting, the following are the results of the final round in which delegates were allocated.)	3; 25 (42.0%)	2; 19 (32.0%)	eliminated in round 2/5	1; 10 (17.0%)	1; 3 (5.0%)	eliminated in round 3/5	eliminated in round 3/5		eliminated in round 4/5		
June 9	4	Nevada	4 (84.4%)	(3.1%)	(0%)							(12.5%)	
June 12	4	Indiana	1.5; 27 (43.5%)	1; 16 (25.81%)	0 (0%)	eliminated in round 2/3	eliminated in round 1/3	eliminated in round 1/3	eliminated in round 1/3	1; 19 (30.65%)	eliminated in round 1/3	.5; 49 (44.14%)	
June 12	12	Maine	3	6						1		2 (Note: 1 for No Candidate, and 1 Undeclared Delegate)	
June 13	5	Washington	2; 29 (44.6%)	3; 36 (55.4%)	eliminated in round 1/3	eliminated in round 1/3	eliminated in round 1/3	eliminated in round 1/3	eliminated in round 1/3	eliminated in round 2/3	eliminated in round 1/3	eliminated in round 2/3	
June 14 (15)	11	Connecticut	6 NA (NA)	3	NA					2			
June 14 (15)	3 (Note: As a result of the three way tie in the preference vote, the Nebraska Green Party decided to send only 3 delegates to the GNC, instead of the 4 delegates they were credentialed.)	Nebraska	1; 2 (33.33%)	1; 2 (33.33%)	0 (0%)							1; 2 (33.33%)	
June 19	0	Alaska	1 (14.3%)	1 (14.3%)		0; 5 (71.4%)							
June 20 (23)	4	Lavender Greens	2; 41 (51.2%)	2; 34 (42.5%)	2 (2.5%)	2 (2.5%)						1 (1.1%)	
June 20 (23)	15	Michigan	7; 48 (47.06)	3; 19 (18.63)	0 (0%)	.5; 2 (1.9%)	1 (>1%)	1 (>1%)	0 (0%)	3; 26 (36.1%)	1 (>1%)	1.5; 5 (6.9%)	
June 23	4	Women's Caucus	2 NA (NA)	2 NA (NA)									
June 24	4	Alabama	3; 4 (67%)	1; 2 (33%)									
June 28	4	Georgia	4; 12 (92.3%)	1 (7.69%)	0 (0%)								
June 29 (Note: The Green Party of Minnesota held a Presidential Preference Caucus Straw Poll on February 25th 2020. Dario Hunter was the winner of this contest. Delegates will be awarded at the GPMN state convention on June 29)	6	Minnesota	0; 0 (0 %)	6 NA (81.25)	0; 0 (0 %)	0; 0 (0 %)	0; 0 (0 %)	0; 0 (0 %)	0; 0 (0 %)	0; 0 (0 %)	0; 0 (0 %)	0; 0 (0 %)	
June 29	4	Latinx Caucus	NA (NA)	3 NA (NA)									
June 30	4	Delaware	1.5; NA (NA)	2.5; NA (NA)									
July 3	4	Kentucky	4; 5 (83.33%)	1 (16.67)	0 (0%)								
July 5	2	Louisiana (Note: The Louisiana Green Party decided to send only 2 delegates to the GNC, instead of the 4 delegates they were credentialed.)	1 NA (40%)			1 (60%)							
July 8	3	Oklahoma	1 NA (28.73%)	1 NA (34.48%)	½ NA (17.24%)							½ NA (18.54%)	
July 9	4	Black Caucus	2; 2 (50%)	2; 2 (50%)									
July 10	4	Iowa	1 NA (NA%)	2 NA (NA%)									
July 9–12	2020 Green National Convention												
Current awarded delegate total: 357 delegates out of 358 delegates.			205	98.5	5	11.5	9	2	1	7	½	17.5	

== Campaign finance ==
This is an overview of the money used by each campaign as it is reported to the Federal Election Commission (FEC). Totals raised include loans from the candidate and transfers from other campaign committees.

Withdrawn candidate

Candidate	Total raised	Individual contributions			Debt	Spent	COH
Candidate	Total raised	Total	Unitemized	Pct	Debt	Spent	COH
Howie Hawkins	$363,119.47	$357,820.60	$263,083.00	73.52%	$160,479.59	$295,085.83	$68,060.04
Dario Hunter	$27,880.28	$16,723.10	$5,023.00	30.04%	$0	$24,836.68	$3,021.00
Susan Buchser Lochocki	$12,706.50	$255.84	$256	100%	$0	$12,496.00	$7,510.50
David Rolde	$8,443.23	$3,328.92	$8.00	0.24%	$0	$6,900.32	$1,542.91
Sedinam Moyowasifza-Curry	$7,129.76	$6,805.00	$1,155.00	16.97%	$0	$2,619.51	$4,635.25
Kent Mesplay	$4,300	$0	$0	0.00%	$18,903	$4,331	$1
Dennis Lambert	$2,867.87	$1,263.00	$1,013.00	80.21%	$939	$1,012.49	$1,855.38
Chad Wilson	filed statement of candidacy						
Ian Schlakman	filed statement of candidacy						

== See also ==
- 2020 United States presidential election

National Conventions

- 2020 Green National Convention
- 2020 Republican National Convention
- 2020 Democratic National Convention
- 2020 Libertarian National Convention
- 2020 Constitution Party National Convention

Presidential primaries

- 2020 Republican Party presidential primaries
- 2020 Democratic Party presidential primaries
- 2020 Libertarian Party presidential primaries
- 2020 Constitution Party presidential primaries
