= 2020 United States presidential election in Hawaii =

- November 3, 2020
- Turnout: 69.65% ▲

Nominee	Joe Biden	Donald Trump
Party	Democratic	Republican
Home state	Delaware	Florida
Running mate	Kamala Harris	Mike Pence
Electoral vote	4	0
Popular vote	366,130	196,864
Percentage	63.73%	34.27%

Biden
40–50%
50–60%
60–70%
70–80%
80–90%
90–100%
Trump
40–50%
50–60%
60–70%
70–80%
90–100%
No data
President before election
Donald Trump
Republican
Elected President
Joe Biden
Democratic

The 2020 United States presidential election in Hawaii was held on Tuesday, November 3, 2020, as part of the 2020 United States presidential election in which all 50 states plus the District of Columbia participated. Hawaii voters chose electors to represent them in the Electoral College via a popular vote, pitting the Republican Party's nominee, incumbent President Donald Trump, and running mate Vice President Mike Pence against Democratic Party nominee, former Vice President Joe Biden, and his running mate California Senator Kamala Harris. Hawaii has four electoral votes in the Electoral College.

Hawaii was the first state in the 2020 election cycle to exceed the voter turnout in 2016, causing the state to attract attention as a representation of an overall trend in increased early voting during the general election.

Prior to the election, Hawaii was considered to be a state Biden would win or a safe blue state. Biden won Hawaii with 63.7% of the vote, with a 29.5% margin over Trump, who earned 34.3%. Both major parties improved their vote shares from 2016, when third parties earned nearly 8% of the vote; Biden's percentage of the vote was slightly higher than Hillary Clinton's 62.9%, while Trump improved over his 30.3% share of the 2016 vote. However, Biden's margin of victory was smaller than Clinton's 32.5%. Hawaii was one of three states where Biden won every county, the other two being Massachusetts and Rhode Island. It was the eighth consecutive election that the Democratic nominee carried every county in the state.

Per exit polls by the Associated Press, Biden had support in Hawaii across different ethnic groups, with 63% of whites and 66% of Asians voting for him. Japanese Americans make up a large percentage of the Hawaiian population, and they are among the most Democratic constituencies. However, Trump gained ground with Filipino Americans in the state. Hawaii was the only state in which the electorate was majority non-white in 2020, with whites comprising only 29% of the electorate.

== Primary elections ==
=== Canceled Republican primary ===
On December 11, 2019, the Hawaii Republican Party became one of several state GOP parties to officially cancel their respective primaries and caucuses. Donald Trump's re-election campaign and GOP officials have cited the fact that Republicans canceled several state primaries when George H. W. Bush and George W. Bush sought a second term in 1992 and 2004, respectively; and Democrats scrapped some of their primaries when Bill Clinton and Barack Obama were seeking re-election in 1996 and 2012, respectively. Because this was the first of the cancelled Republican state races to directly bind its delegates to the national convention (as opposed to a walking subcaucus-type system), Trump automatically was awarded his first 19 pledged delegates of the nomination campaign.

=== Democratic primary ===
The Hawaii Democratic primary was originally scheduled for April 4, 2020. On March 20, due to concerns over the COVID-19 pandemic, the Hawaii Democratic Party canceled in-person voting in favor of mail-in voting. The deadline was then extended to May 22.

The primary was conducted by ranked-choice voting. Voters were instructed to mark their top three choices on paper ballots. Any voter with a first choice other than Biden or Sanders had their ballot count in the final round if ranking one of those candidates as a second or third choice.

2020 Hawaii Democratic presidential primary
Candidate	Votes	%	Delegates
Joe Biden	21,215	60.54	16
Bernie Sanders (withdrawn)	12,337	35.20	8
Void Votes	68	0.19	
Inactive votes (Note: Votes which had all its 3 ranked vote-choices allocated towards eliminated candidates who did not reach the threshold of 15%.)	1,424	4.06	
Total	35,044	100%	24

=== Green primary ===
Green Party of Hawaii presidential primary, May 23, 2020
Candidate	Percentage	National delegates
Dario Hunter	41.6%	2
Howie Hawkins	33.3%	2
Kent Mesplay	8.3%	0
Dennis Lambert	8.3%	0
Chad Wilson	8.3%	0
Susan Buchser-Lochocki	0%	0
Sedinam Moyowasifza-Curry	0%	0
David Rolde	0%	0
No Preference	0%	0
Total	100.00%	4

== General election ==
=== Final predictions ===
Source	Ranking
The Cook Political Report	Solid D
Inside Elections	Solid D
Sabato's Crystal Ball	Safe D
Politico	Solid D
RCP	Solid D
Niskanen	Safe D
CNN	Solid D
The Economist	Safe D
CBS News	Likely D
270towin	Safe D
ABC News	Solid D
NPR	Likely D
NBC News	Solid D
538	Solid D

=== Polling ===
View source data.

==== Aggregate polls ====
Source of poll aggregation	Dates administered	Dates updated	Joe Biden Democratic	Donald Trump Republican	Other/ Undecided (Note: Calculated by taking the difference of 100% and all other candidates combined.)	Margin
270 to Win	October 1–16, 2020	November 2, 2020	63.5%	30.5%	5.9%	Biden +33.0
FiveThirtyEight	until November 2, 2020	November 3, 2020	64.3%	30.0%	5.7%	Biden +34.3
Average			63.8%	30.6%	5.6%	Biden +33.2

==== Polls ====
Poll source	Date(s) administered	Sample size (Note: Key: A – all adults RV – registered voters LV – likely voters V – unclear)	Margin of error	Donald Trump Republican	Joe Biden Democratic	Jo Jorgensen Libertarian	Howie Hawkins Green	Other	Undecided
SurveyMonkey/Axios	Oct 20 – Nov 2, 2020	688 (LV)	± 5%	31% (Note: Overlapping sample with the previous SurveyMonkey/Axios poll, but more information available regarding sample size)	67%	-	-	–	–
SurveyMonkey/Axios	Oct 1–28, 2020	1,263 (LV)	–	34%	63%	-	-	–	–
Mason-Dixon	Oct 12–14, 2020	625 (LV)	± 4%	29%	58%	-	-	5%	8%
MRG Research/Civil Beat/HNN	Oct 2–7, 2020	988 (RV)	± 3.1%	28%	61%	-	-	4% (Note: "Neither" with 4%)	7%
SurveyMonkey/Axios	Sep 1–30, 2020	474 (LV)	–	33%	66%	-	-	–	1%
SurveyMonkey/Axios	Aug 1–31, 2020	362 (LV)	–	37%	61%	-	-	–	2%
SurveyMonkey/Axios	Jul 1–31, 2020	356 (LV)	–	37%	62%	-	-	–	2%
MRG Research	Jul 27–30, 2020	975 (RV)	± 3.1%	29%	56%	-	-	6% (Note: "Neither" with 6%)	10%
SurveyMonkey/Axios	Jun 8–30, 2020	207 (LV)	–	30%	67%	-	-	–	3%

=== Results ===
2020 United States presidential election in Hawaii
Party	Candidate	Votes	%	±%
Democratic	Joe Biden Kamala Harris	366,130	63.73%	+0.85%
Republican	Donald Trump (incumbent) Mike Pence (incumbent)	196,864	34.27%	+3.91%
Libertarian	Jo Jorgensen Spike Cohen	5,539	0.96%	−2.80%
Green	Howie Hawkins Angela Walker	3,822	0.67%	−2.33%
American Shopping	Brock Pierce Karla Ballard	1,183	0.21%	N/A
Constitution	Don Blankenship William Mohr	931	0.16%	−0.89%
Total votes		574,469	100.00%	

=== By county ===
County	Joe Biden Democratic		Donald Trump Republican		Various candidates Other parties		Margin		Total votes cast
County	#	%	#	%	#	%	#	%	Total votes cast
Hawaii	58,731	66.88%	26,897	30.63%	2,186	2.49%	31,834	36.25%	87,814
Honolulu	238,869	62.51%	136,259	35.66%	6,986	1.82%	102,610	26.85%	382,114
Kalawao	23	95.83%	1	4.17%	0	0.00%	22	91.66%	24
Kauaʻi	21,225	63.36%	11,582	34.58%	690	1.83%	9,643	28.78%	33,497
Maui	47,282	66.58%	22,125	31.15%	1,613	2.27%	25,157	35.45%	71,020
Totals	366,130	63.73%	196,864	34.27%	11,475	2.00%	169,266	29.46%	574,469

=== By congressional district ===
Biden won both congressional districts in the state.

District	Trump	Biden	Representative
1st	34%	64%	Ed Case
2nd	34%	64%	Tulsi Gabbard
2nd	34%	64%	Kai Kahele

== Electors ==
The Democratic Party of Hawaii selected the following individuals to cast Electoral College votes for Biden:

- John Bickel, a government and history teacher from Oahu
- Mike Golojuch Sr. - an Air Force veteran and long-time Democratic activist from Oahu
- Hermina "Mina" Morita - a retired state lawmaker from Kaua'i
- Kainoa Kaumeheiwa-Rego - a community advocate for the Office of Hawaiian Affairs from Oahu

== Analysis ==
Hawaii was one of only seven states (Note: The other states are Arkansas, California, Florida, Nevada, Illinois, and Utah.) and the District of Columbia where Trump's margin increased from 2016, and its 2.72% shift was the largest. Trump won more precincts than he did in 2016, winning more of the west coast of Oahu than he did before and every single vote on Niihau. Trump won more votes in Hawaii than any Republican in history, but not a larger percentage, narrowly beating George W. Bush's performance in 2004. Despite this modest pro-Trump margin swing, Biden received more votes than Clinton, as was the case for the five other states and the District of Columbia that he won.

Despite Biden's overwhelming victory in the state, this was the first election since 2004 in which Hawaii was not the most Democratic state in terms of margin or percentage; that title went to Vermont instead, with Massachusetts and Maryland also being ahead of Hawaii.

== See also ==
- United States presidential elections in Hawaii
- 2020 Hawaii elections
- 2020 United States presidential election
- 2020 Democratic Party presidential primaries
- 2020 Green Party presidential primaries
- 2020 Republican Party presidential primaries
- 2020 United States elections
