= 1932 United States presidential election in Maryland =

- November 8, 1932

Nominee	Franklin D. Roosevelt	Herbert Hoover
Party	Democratic	Republican
Home state	New York	California
Running mate	John Nance Garner	Charles Curtis
Electoral vote	8	0
Popular vote	314,314	184,184
Percentage	61.50%	36.04%
County results
Roosevelt
50–60%
60–70%
Hoover
40–50%
50–60%
President before election
Herbert Hoover
Republican
Elected President
Franklin D. Roosevelt
Democratic

The 1932 United States presidential election in Maryland took place on November 8, 1932, as part of the 1932 United States presidential election. State voters chose eight representatives, or electors, to the Electoral College, who voted for president and vice president.

Maryland was won by Governor Franklin D. Roosevelt (D–New York), running with Speaker of the House John Nance Garner, with 61.50% of the popular vote, against incumbent President Herbert Hoover (R–California), running with Vice President Charles Curtis, with 36.04% of the popular vote.

Until 2020, this was the last time the Democratic candidate won over 65% of the vote in Howard County. As of 2020, this is also the last time the Republican candidate failed to win a single county on the Eastern Shore.

== Results ==
1932 United States presidential election in Maryland
Party	Candidate	Votes	%
Democratic	Franklin D. Roosevelt	314,314	61.50%
Republican	Herbert Hoover (inc.)	184,184	36.04%
Socialist	Norman Thomas	10,489	2.05%
Socialist Labor	Verne L. Reynolds	1,036	0.20%
Communist	William Z. Foster	1,031	0.20%
Total votes		511,054	100%

=== Results by county ===
County	Franklin D. Roosevelt Democratic		Herbert Hoover Republican		Norman Thomas Socialist		Various candidates Other parties		Margin		Total votes cast
County	#	%	#	%	#	%	#	%	#	%	Total votes cast
Allegany	12,033	45.71%	12,911	49.05%	1,252	4.76%	126	0.48%	-878	-3.34%	26,322
Anne Arundel	9,761	61.26%	5,778	36.26%	280	1.76%	114	0.72%	3,983	25.00%	15,933
Baltimore	24,626	62.35%	13,938	35.29%	830	2.10%	100	0.25%	10,688	27.06%	39,494
Baltimore City	160,309	64.84%	78,954	31.94%	6,860	2.77%	1,109	0.45%	81,355	32.91%	247,232
Calvert	1,696	47.41%	1,838	51.38%	9	0.25%	34	0.95%	-142	-3.97%	3,577
Caroline	3,651	64.38%	1,998	35.23%	14	0.25%	8	0.14%	1,653	29.15%	5,671
Carroll	6,482	52.67%	5,732	46.58%	68	0.55%	24	0.20%	750	6.09%	12,306
Cecil	4,282	53.80%	3,569	44.84%	72	0.90%	36	0.45%	713	8.96%	7,959
Charles	2,473	56.58%	1,851	42.35%	15	0.34%	32	0.73%	622	14.23%	4,371
Dorchester	4,547	56.47%	3,466	43.05%	22	0.27%	17	0.21%	1,081	13.43%	8,052
Frederick	10,686	59.29%	7,144	39.64%	152	0.84%	42	0.23%	3,542	19.65%	18,024
Garrett	2,232	41.01%	3,048	56.00%	146	2.68%	17	0.31%	-816	-14.99%	5,443
Harford	6,073	59.93%	3,954	39.02%	69	0.68%	38	0.37%	2,119	20.91%	10,134
Howard	4,161	67.22%	1,970	31.83%	36	0.58%	23	0.37%	2,191	35.40%	6,190
Kent	2,370	61.49%	1,468	38.09%	8	0.21%	8	0.21%	902	23.40%	3,854
Montgomery	9,882	62.69%	5,698	36.15%	132	0.84%	51	0.32%	4,184	26.54%	15,763
Prince George's	11,580	62.41%	6,696	36.09%	194	1.05%	86	0.46%	4,884	26.32%	18,556
Queen Anne's	3,683	69.57%	1,583	29.90%	14	0.26%	14	0.26%	2,100	39.67%	5,294
Somerset	4,811	56.30%	3,675	43.01%	34	0.40%	25	0.29%	1,136	13.29%	8,545
St. Mary's	2,885	67.09%	1,322	30.74%	11	0.26%	82	1.91%	1,563	36.35%	4,300
Talbot	4,233	60.91%	2,672	38.45%	24	0.35%	21	0.30%	1,561	22.46%	6,950
Washington	11,370	55.39%	8,929	43.50%	214	1.04%	14	0.07%	2,441	11.89%	20,527
Wicomico	6,895	64.11%	3,812	35.44%	25	0.23%	23	0.21%	3,083	28.67%	10,755
Worcester	3,593	61.93%	2,178	37.54%	8	0.14%	23	0.40%	1,415	24.39%	5,802
Totals	314,314	61.50%	184,184	36.04%	10,489	2.05%	2,067	0.40%	130,130	25.46%	511,054

==== Counties that flipped from Republican to Democratic ====
- Anne Arundel
- Baltimore (City)
- Baltimore (County)
- Caroline
- Carroll
- Cecil
- Charles
- Dorchester
- Frederick
- Harford
- Howard
- Kent
- Montgomery
- Prince George's
- Somerset
- Talbot
- Washington
- Wicomico
- Worcester

== See also ==
- United States presidential elections in Maryland
- 1932 United States presidential election
- 1932 United States elections
