= 2020 Green National Convention =

U.S. political event held virtually online

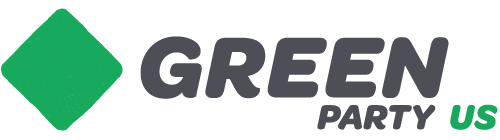
- 2020 presidential election

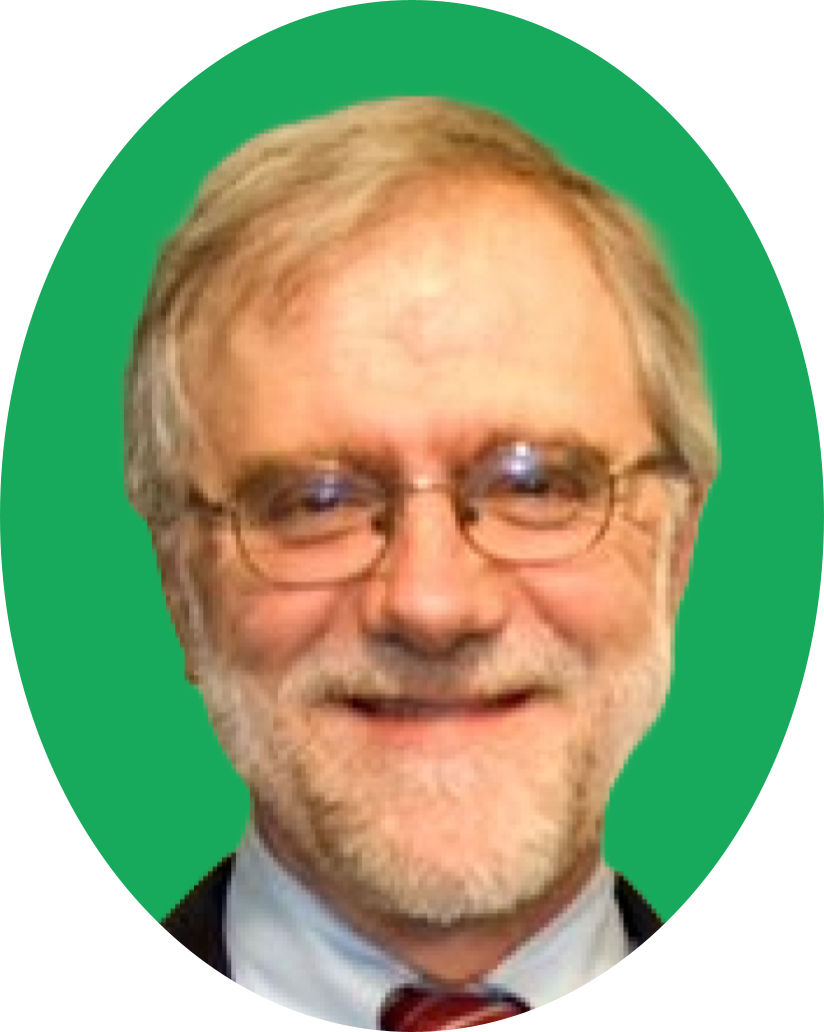
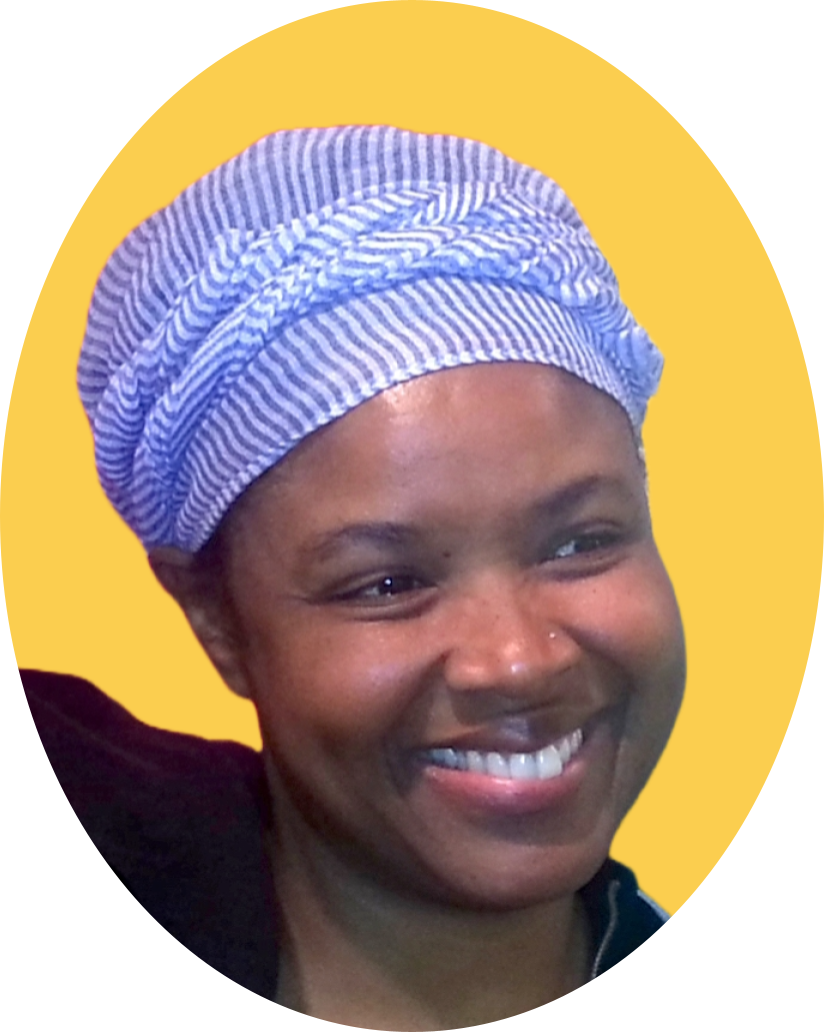
- Nominees; Hawkins and Walker

Convention
- Date(s): July 9–12, 2020
- Venue: Online

Candidates
- Presidential nominee: Howie Hawkins of New York
- Vice-presidential nominee: Angela Walker of South Carolina

Voting
- Total delegates: 358
- Votes needed for nomination: 179; Simple majority

The 2020 Green National Convention (GNC) or presidential nominating convention was an event in which delegates of the Green Party of the United States (GPUS) chose its nominees for president and vice president in the 2020 U.S. presidential election. The convention was originally scheduled to be held July 9–12, 2020, at Wayne State University in Detroit, Michigan, but it was decided to instead hold the convention online due to the COVID-19 pandemic.

== Site selection ==
On August 18, 2019, the Green National Committee selected Detroit, Michigan, as the site for the 2020 convention, to take place from July 9 to 12 at Wayne State University. Greenville, South Carolina, and Spartanburg, South Carolina, were also considered to host the convention. On April 24, 2020, it was instead announced that plans to have a physical convention had been cancelled and that it would instead be held online, as Wayne State University had informed the Green Party that it would be not able to accommodate them due to the COVID-19 pandemic.

== Delegate allocation ==
GPUS-affiliated parties may elect delegates to the presidential nominating convention, typically conducted through a state party convention, caucus or primary. GPUS identity caucuses also elect delegates to the convention. Based on active state parties and caucuses, there can be up to 350 delegates in attendance, apportioned mostly proportionally (a minimum apportionment and a cap on a party's apportionment of 21% of the total), each committed to vote in reflection of their state party membership's preference. Many states send delegates representing multiple candidates, rejecting the feature of artificial disproportionality resulting from, in examples, the general ticket or district elections, in deference to proportionality.

The delegates of the presidential nominating convention are different from the elected delegates of the Green National Committee, the party's routine decision-making body.

== Speakers ==
The following people were announced as speakers at the convention:

- Ajamu Baraka, Green Party 2016 vice-presidential nominee, political activist and scholar, whose work has appeared in Black Agenda Report, Common Dreams, and Dissident Voice
- Margaret Flowers, advisor to Physicians for a National Health Plan (PNHP) and co-founder of Health Over Profit for Everyone (HOPE)
- Cam Gordon, member of the Minneapolis City Council since 2006, co-founder of the Green Party of Minnesota
- Robin Harris, Green Party and George Floyd Rebellions. Green Party National Black Caucus co-chair and 2018 Green Party candidate for Orange County Commissioner, Florida.
- Seth Kaper-Dale, co-pastor of the Reformed Church of Highland Park, New Jersey; 2017 Green Party candidate for governor of New Jersey; author of A Voice for Justice: Sermons that Prepared a Congregation to Respond to God in the Decade After 9/11
- Margaret Kimberly, co-founder, editor and columnist for Black Agenda Report; author of Prejudential: Black America and the Presidents
- Jenny Leong, two-term member of the Legislative Assembly of New South Wales, Australia
- Lisa Savage, Maine Green Independent Party's candidate for U.S. Senate, running in a ranked choice voting election for that office
- Jill Stein, presidential candidate in 2016 and 2012; keynote: "Greens – more than ever, we are the ones we've been waiting for"

== Presidential delegate vote ==
At the convention, vote totals for the options were given, including an incorrect sum for the lumped-together None of the above and Uncommitted votes. Ballot Access News reported, as in previous years, the delegation-by-delegation votes, lumping together No nominee, None of the above and Uncommitted votes and omitting candidates not qualified by the GNC (Jesse Ventura, Kent Mesplay, Susan Lochoki and Bernie Sanders), except for in totals, and making a mistake on the line for the GP of Texas, though the totals are correct.

2020 Green National Convention presidential vote
Candidate	Delegates	Percentage	Note
Howie Hawkins	210	58.82%	
Dario Hunter	102	28.57%	
Sedinam Moyowasifza-Curry	11.5	3.22%	
Dennis Lambert	8.5	2.38%	
Jesse Ventura	7	1.96%	(Note: 2 from the Connecticut GP, 1 from the Maine Green Independent Party and 4 from the GP of Michigan)
Uncommitted	6	1.68%	(Note: 1 from the Arizona GP, 1 from the GP of Colorado, 1 from the Iowa GP, 2 from the Missouri GP and 1 from the GP of Utah)
David Rolde	4.5	1.26%	
No nominee	3	0.84%	(Note: 2 from the Maine Green Independent Party and 1 from the Nebraska GP)
Kent Mesplay	2	0.56%	(Note: from the GP of Texas)
Susan Lochoki	1	0.28%	
None of the above	1	0.28%	(Note: from the GP of Florida)
Bernie Sanders	0.5	0.14%	(Note: from the GP of Michigan)
Totals	357	100%	(Note: The Alabama GP submitted only 3/4 of their votes.)

Howie Hawkins
Dario Hunter
Sedinam Moyowasifza-Curry
No preference
No delegates

== Vice-presidential delegate vote ==
Angela Walker was approved by consensus by the 221 delegates, securing the nomination as vice-presidential candidate.

== See also ==
- 2020 Green Party presidential primaries
- 2020 Republican National Convention
- 2020 Democratic National Convention
- 2020 Libertarian National Convention
- 2020 Constitution Party National Convention
- 2020 United States presidential election
