= Idaho Green Party =

Green Party of Idaho
- Headquarters: 1810 W State Street # 325, Boise, Idaho, 83702, United States
- Ideology: Green politics
- Political position: Left-wing
- National affiliation: Green Party of the United States
- Colors: Green
- Seats in the U.S. Senate: 0 / 2
- Seats in the U.S. House: 0 / 2
- Idaho Senate: 0 / 35
- Idaho House of Representatives: 0 / 70
- Other elected officials: 0 (February 2024)

Website
- Green Party of Idaho

The Green Party of Idaho is the state party organization for Idaho of the Green Party of the United States.

They have been put on inactive status by the Green Party of the United States since 2010. As of 2020, the Idaho Green Party is petitioning to become an active party again.

The Idaho Green party has been doing research in areas to form their platforms and policies. They have come up with four major pillars which include Peace, Ecology, Social Justice, and Democracy. They have also created 10 key values that explains in detail what they stand for and believe in. Petitions the Idaho Green Party members have purposed in the past involve the legalization and use of medical marijuana in the State of Idaho, and they have petitioned to increase the minimum wage in the State of Idaho. Due to the lack of signatures received from the citizens of Idaho, both these petitions failed.

== Elections ==
=== 2001 ===
In 2001, Jeremy Maxand ran in the Boise mayoral election as a Green candidate (although the race was officially nonpartisan). He ultimately received the third-highest vote share, with 2,545 votes, for 7.61 percent of all votes cast.

Jason Shaw was elected into the Boise City Council as a Green candidate.

=== 2004 ===
In the 2004 presidential election, Green Party candidate David Cobb did not attain ballot access in the state. However, he received 58 votes as a write-in candidate, amounting to 0.01 percent of all votes cast in that race.

At the local level in the 2004 general election, Ada County Green Party spokesman and Idaho Green Party secretary Kevin Bayhouse ran for the officially nonpartisan office of Highway District Commissioner for Ada County's first district. Bayhouse entered the race three hours before the filing deadline, after the incumbent commissioner announced that he would not be seeking re-election. His platform included policies to address air quality, improving public transit, and charging developers for a portion of the public infrastructure necessitated by their projects. The Bayhouse campaign was run on a budget of under $300, was the only campaign out of seven to have a website, and received the endorsement of the Idaho Statesman. Bayhouse ultimately received 2,308 votes, or 11.46 percent of all ballots cast, placing fourth in a field of seven candidates.

Following the results of the election, the Idaho Green Party announced its intention to lodge a formal complaint in response to several occurrences in the election, including the fact that the names of three candidates in the highway commissioner's race who had dropped out remained on the ballot; about 25 percent of the vote in that race went to dropped-out candidates, greater than the margin of victory in the race. The state party also objected to the state's handling of reporting of write-in votes for Cobb and independent candidate Ralph Nader, arguing that the release of results was "late and inaccurate".

=== 2008 ===
Cynthia McKinney and her running mate Rosa Clemente where write-ins for Idaho. They received 39 votes taking about .01% of the vote.

=== 2012 ===
Jill Stein and her running mate Cheri Honkala were on the ballot as an independent ticket. They received 4,402 votes taking about .7% of the vote.

=== 2016 ===
Jill Stein and her running mate Ajamu Baraka were on the ballot as independent-affiliated. They received 8,464 votes, taking about 1.23% of the vote.

== See also ==
- Green Party of the United States
- List of state Green Parties in the United States
- Political party strength in Idaho
