= List of state Green Parties in the United States =

The Green Party of the United States, also known as GPUS, is one of the two minor contemporary political parties in the United States with a sustained national presence, the other being the Libertarian Party. The Green Party has affiliated state parties in most states. However, not all state Green Parties are affiliated with GPUS, with those parties included separately in the following list.

== Organizations of GPUS ==
Overview of American Green Parties
State/Territorial Party	Chair	Local Officeholders	Upper House Seats	Lower House Seats	Website
Green National Committee	Collective Leadership	>110 Total	0 / 100	0 / 435	
Alabama Green Party	[?]	0	0 / 35	0 / 105	
Alaska (unaccredited)	n/a		0 / 20	0 / 40	
Arizona Green Party	[?]	0	0 / 30	0 / 60	
Green Party of Arkansas	[?]	1	0 / 35	0 / 100	
Green Party of California	Mimi Newton	41	0 / 40	0 / 80	
Green Party of Colorado	Andrea Mérida Cuéllar & Dave Bell	1	0 / 35	0 / 65	
Connecticut Green Party	[?]	11	0 / 36	0 / 151	
Green Party of Delaware	[?]	0	0 / 21	0 / 41	
Green Party of Florida	Randy Toler & Laura Potts	0	0 / 40	0 / 120	
Georgia (unaccredited)	n/a		0 / 56	0 / 180	
Unified Green Party Of Georgia					
Green Party of Hawaii	Susan Robertsemery & Budd Dickinson	0	0 / 25	0 / 51	
Idaho Green Party (inactive)	n/a		0 / 35	0 / 70	
Illinois Green Party	Sheldon Shafer & A. J. Reed	9	0 / 59	0 / 118	
Indiana Green Party	Pluto Brand	0	0 / 50	0 / 100	
Iowa Green Party	Erin Young	0	0 / 50	0 / 100	
Kansas Green Party	Teresa Wilke & Kent Rowe	0	0 / 40	0 / 125	
Kentucky Green Party (inactive)	n/a		0 / 38	0 / 100	
Green Party of Louisiana	Chris Stella	1	0 / 39	0 / 105	
Maine Green Independent Party	Collective Leadership	4	0 / 35	0 / 151	
Maryland Green Party	Olivia Romano	2	0 / 47	0 / 141	
Green-Rainbow Party of Massachusetts	Collective Leadership	7	0 / 40	0 / 160	
Green Party of Michigan	Amanda Slepr & Tom Mair	4	0 / 38	0 / 110	
Green Party of Minnesota	Trahern Crews	3	0 / 67	0 / 134	
Green Party of Mississippi	[?]	0	0 / 52	0 / 122	
Missouri Green Party	Don Fitz	1	0 / 34	0 / 163	
Green Party of Montana	[?]	0	0 / 50	0 / 100	
Nebraska Green Party	[?]	0	Nebraska Legislature; 0 / 49		
Green Party of Nevada	[?]	0	0 / 21	0 / 42	
New Hampshire (unaccredited)	n/a		0 / 24	0 / 400	
Green Party of New Jersey	Collective Leadership	1	0 / 40	0 / 80	
Green Party of New Mexico	[?]	0	0 / 42	0 / 70	
Green Party of New York	Gloria Mattera & Peter LaVenia	4	0 / 63	0 / 150	
North Carolina Green Party	Tommie James & Tony Ndege	0	0 / 50	0 / 120	
North Dakota (unaccredited)	n/a		0 / 47	0 / 94	
Green Party of Ohio	Nathaniel Lane & Philena Farley	1	0 / 33	0 / 99	
Green Party of Oklahoma	[?]	0	0 / 48	0 / 101	
Pacific Green Party of Oregon	Collective Leadership	5	0 / 30	0 / 60	
Green Party of Pennsylvania	Tim Runkle & Colleen Schmotzer	14	0 / 50	0 / 203	
Rhode Island (unaccredited)	n/a		0 / 38	0 / 75	
South Carolina Green Party	Collective Leadership	2	0 / 46	0 / 124	
South Dakota Green Party	Shaun Little Horn	0	0 / 35	0 / 70	
Green Party of Tennessee	[?]	0	0 / 33	0 / 99	
Green Party of Texas	Wesson Gaige & Laura Palmer	1	0 / 31	0 / 150	
Green Party of Utah	Jessica Bronson & Dee Taylor	2	0 / 29	0 / 75	
Vermont Green Party (inactive)	n/a		0 / 30	0 / 150	
Green Party of Virginia	Ryan Wesdock & Tina Rockett	2	0 / 40	0 / 100	
Green Party of Washington State	Collective Leadership	0	0 / 49	0 / 95	
West Virginia Mountain Party	Denise Binion	2	0 / 34	0 / 100	
Wisconsin Green Party	Jo' Nathan Kingfisher & Dave Schwab	2	0 / 33	0 / 99	
Wyoming Green Party (inactive)	n/a		0 / 30	0 / 60	
D.C. Statehood Green Party	Darryl Moch	1	Council of the District of Columbia; 0 / 13		
Green Party of the Virgin Islands (inactive)	n/a		Legislature of the Virgin Islands; 0 / 15		

== Standalone state parties ==
=== Alaska ===
The Green Party of Alaska is a political party in the U.S. state of Alaska. It was the Alaska affiliate of the national state Green Party, from its creation until 2021, but the state party broke the party rules when it refused to recognize the nominated presidential candidate, Howie Hawkins in the 2020 presidential election. Alaska was the first state to gain Green Party ballot access, in 1990, when Jim Sykes ran for governor. Sykes had previously filed a ballot access lawsuit, citing an earlier case, Vogler v. Miller.

Like the Alaska Libertarian Party, the Green Party organizes local affiliate groups by regions of the state rather than election districts. It is known for calling these groups bioregions. The organized bioregions of the GPAK include the Southcentral Bioregion (Anchorage area) and the Tanana-Yukon Bioregion (the Interior, around the Tanana and Yukon River areas).

=== Georgia ===
The Georgia Green Party is a state-level political party in Georgia. Their candidate for president in 2016 was Dr. Jill Stein. Stein was denied access to the ballot. The party sued and won at the United States Court of Appeals for the Eleventh Circuit. The state chapter was disaffiliated by the Green Party of the United States on June 26, 2021, due to the state chapter drafting and passing a platform amendment against the rights of transgender people, counter to the GPUS platform.

=== Rhode Island ===
==== OSGP ====
The Ocean State Green Party (OSGP) is a Green party in the United States. The party was founded in summer 2020, originally as a small group of supporters of the Hawkins-Walker 2020 campaign in Rhode Island. After the older Green Party of Rhode Island refused to support the presidential campaign, these supporters opted to reject this decision and collect signatures to gain a ballot line for the Green Party ticket. They then proceeded to file a complaint with the Accreditation Committee of the Green Party of the United States.

==== GPRI ====
The Green Party of Rhode Island (GPRI) is one of the oldest active Green parties in the United States. The party was founded on March 6, 1992, at a meeting of 40 activists from Rhode Island. In November 1996, GPRI was one of 12 founding parties in the Association of State Green Parties, renamed the Green Party of the United States in 2001. Several Rhode Island party leaders have served as officers of the national Green Party. The party's candidates run for municipal councils in several cities and towns, such as running for Mayor of Providence, the State Senate and the State House of Representatives, U.S. Congress, and for Lieutenant governor. The Green Party of Rhode Island was involved in nationwide Green politics, until 2020 when the state party leadership took the rogue position to refuse to place the Green nominee for president, Howie Hawkins, on the ballot. Rather than face deaccreditation, the state party ended its affiliation with GPUS.

=== Virginia ===
The Independent Greens of Virginia, (also known as the Indy Greens), was the state affiliate of the Independence Party of America in the Commonwealth of Virginia. It became a state party around 2003 when a faction of the Arlington local chapter of the Green Party of Virginia (GPVA) split from the main party. As of 2011, it bills itself as a "fiscally conservative, socially responsible green party", with an emphasis on rail transportation and "more candidates". In support of wider ballot participation, it endorses many independent candidates who are not affiliated with the party.

== See also ==
- List of state parties of the Democratic Party (United States)
- List of state parties of the Libertarian Party (United States)
- List of state parties of the Republican Party (United States)
