= 2020 United States presidential election in Maryland =

- November 3, 2020
- Turnout: 74.63% (▲2.65 pp)

Nominee	Joe Biden	Donald Trump
Party	Democratic	Republican
Home state	Delaware	Florida
Running mate	Kamala Harris	Mike Pence
Electoral vote	10	0
Popular vote	1,985,023	976,414
Percentage	65.36%	32.15%

Biden
40–50%
50–60%
60–70%
70–80%
80–90%
90–100%
Trump
40–50%
50–60%
60–70%
70–80%
80–90%
90–100%
No Data
President before election
Donald Trump
Republican
Elected President
Joe Biden
Democratic

The 2020 United States presidential election in Maryland was held on Tuesday, November 3, 2020, as part of the 2020 United States presidential election in which all 50 states plus the District of Columbia participated. Maryland voters chose electors to represent them in the Electoral College via a popular vote, pitting the Republican Party's nominee, incumbent President Donald Trump, and running mate Vice President Mike Pence against Democratic Party nominee, former Vice President Joe Biden, and his running mate California Senator Kamala Harris. Maryland has 10 electoral votes in the Electoral College.

Biden easily carried Maryland with 65.4% of the vote to Trump's 32.2% (a margin of 33.2%, significantly larger than Hillary Clinton's 26.4% in 2016). Prior to the election, all news organizations projecting the election considered Maryland a state that Biden would carry comfortably. Maryland has long been a Democratic-leaning state, and no Republican presidential candidate has won it since George H. W. Bush in 1988. Biden carried the Black-majority, suburban counties of Prince George's County and Charles County with over 80% and 60% of the vote respectively, Baltimore City with almost 90% of the vote, and the white-majority, suburban counties of Montgomery, Howard, and Baltimore with over 60% each. While Republicans typically win more counties by running up margins in more rural western Maryland and the Eastern Shore, the Baltimore-Washington area casts over three-fourths of the state's vote, making it difficult for a Republican to carry Maryland. While Trump won 14 of Maryland's 24 county-level jurisdictions, Biden won the six largest, all of which are part of the Baltimore-Washington area–Montgomery, Prince George's, Anne Arundel, Howard and Baltimore counties and Baltimore City–by over a million votes collectively, more than enough to carry the state.

Per exit polls by the Associated Press, Biden's principal strength in Maryland came from winning 94% of African Americans, who represented 28% of the electorate. 74% of voters believed the criminal justice system needed a complete overhaul or major changes, and they opted for Biden by 73%. Biden won all other major demographic groups, including 52% of Whites (the first time since 1964 that a Democratic candidate won the white vote in Maryland), 69% of Latinos, 79% of Jews, 54% of Protestants, and 51% of Catholics. Frederick, Kent, and Talbot counties voted for Trump in 2016, but supported Biden in 2020.

== Primary elections ==
The primary elections were originally scheduled for April 28, 2020. On March 17, they were moved to June 2 due to concerns over the COVID-19 pandemic.

=== Republican primary ===
Donald Trump won the Republican primary, and thus received all of the state's 38 delegates to the 2020 Republican National Convention.

=== Democratic primary ===
2020 Maryland Democratic presidential primary
Candidate	Votes	%	Delegates
Joe Biden	879,753	83.72	96
Bernie Sanders (withdrawn)	81,939	7.80	
Elizabeth Warren (withdrawn)	27,134	2.58	
Pete Buttigieg (withdrawn)	7,180	0.68	
Michael Bloomberg (withdrawn)	6,773	0.64	
Andrew Yang (withdrawn)	6,670	0.63	
Amy Klobuchar (withdrawn)	5,685	0.54	
Tulsi Gabbard (withdrawn)	4,226	0.40	
Cory Booker (withdrawn)	2,662	0.25	
Michael Bennet (withdrawn)	2,291	0.22	
Marianne Williamson (withdrawn)	897	0.09	
Julian Castro (withdrawn)	760	0.07	
Tom Steyer (withdrawn)	671	0.06	
Deval Patrick (withdrawn)	406	0.04	
Uncommitted	23,726	2.26	
Total	1,050,773	100%	96

=== Green primary ===
2020 Maryland Green Party primary
Candidate	Round 1		Round 2		Round 3		Round 4	
Candidate	Votes	%	Votes	%	Votes	%	Votes	%
Howie Hawkins	34	53.1%	34	61.8%	34	64.15%	34	68%
Dario Hunter	16	25%	16	29.1%	16	30.18%	16	32%
Kent Mesplay	2	3.1%	3	5.5%	3	5.66%	Eliminated	
Write-ins	2	3.1%	2	3.6%	Eliminated			
Sedinam Moyowasiza-Curry	1	1.6%	Eliminated					
Empty ballot	9	14.1%	Eliminated					
Total votes							64	100.0%

== General election ==
=== Predictions ===
Source	Ranking	As of
The Cook Political Report	Safe D	September 10, 2020
Inside Elections	Safe D	September 4, 2020
Sabato's Crystal Ball	Safe D	July 14, 2020
Politico	Safe D	September 8, 2020
RCP	Safe D	August 3, 2020
Niskanen	Safe D	July 26, 2020
CNN	Safe D	August 3, 2020
The Economist	Safe D	September 2, 2020
CBS News	Likely D	August 16, 2020
270towin	Safe D	August 2, 2020
ABC News	Safe D	July 31, 2020
NPR	Likely D	August 3, 2020
NBC News	Safe D	August 6, 2020
538	Safe D	September 9, 2020

=== Polling ===
==== Graphical summary ====
View source data.

==== Aggregate polls ====
Source of poll aggregation	Dates administered	Dates updated	Joe Biden Democratic	Donald Trump Republican	Other/ Undecided (Note: Calculated by taking the difference of 100% and all other candidates combined.)	Margin
270 to Win	October 7–26, 2020	November 3, 2020	60.0%	31.7%	8.3%	Biden +28.3
Real Clear Politics	September 4 – October 24, 2020	November 3, 2020	60.3%	31.0%	8.7%	Biden +29.3
FiveThirtyEight	until November 2, 2020	November 3, 2020	63.1%	31.6%	5.3%	Biden +31.4
Average			61.1%	31.4%	7.4%	Biden +29.7

==== Polls ====
Poll source	Date(s) administered	Sample size (Note: Key: A – all adults RV – registered voters LV – likely voters V – unclear)	Margin of error	Donald Trump Republican	Joe Biden Democratic	Jo Jorgensen Libertarian	Howie Hawkins Green	Other	Undecided
SurveyMonkey/Axios	Oct 20 – Nov 2, 2020	3,216 (LV)	± 2.5%	31% (Note: Overlapping sample with the previous SurveyMonkey/Axios poll, but more information available regarding sample size)	66%	–	–	–	–
Swayable	Oct 23 – Nov 1, 2020	503 (LV)	± 5.7%	31%	67%	2%	0%	–	–
SurveyMonkey/Axios	Oct 1–28, 2020	5,820 (LV)	–	32%	66%	–	–	–	–
Gonzalez Maryland Poll	Oct 19–24, 2020	820 (RV)	± 3.5%	33%	58%	–	–	3% (Note: "Someone else" with 3%)	6%
Goucher College	Sep 30 – Oct 4, 2020	776 (LV)	± 3.5%	30%	61%	2%	2%	3% (Note: "Refused" with 3%)	2%
Change Research/Our Voice Maryland	Sep 29 – Oct 1, 2020	650 (V)	± 4.55%	32%	61%	–	–	–	–
SurveyMonkey/Axios	Sep 1–30, 2020	2,364 (LV)	–	31%	67%	–	–	–	2%
OpinionWorks	Sep 4–11, 2020	753 (LV)	–	30%	62%	–	–	3%	5%
SurveyMonkey/Axios	Aug 1–31, 2020	1,813 (LV)	–	31%	66%	–	–	–	3%
SurveyMonkey/Axios	Jul 1–31, 2020	1,911 (LV)	–	32%	66%	–	–	–	2%
SurveyMonkey/Axios	Jun 8–30, 2020	1,175 (LV)	–	34%	64%	–	–	–	2%
Gonzalez Maryland Poll	May 19–23, 2020	810 (LV)	± 3.5%	31%	59%	–	–	–	6%
Goucher College	Feb 13–19, 2020	718 (LV)	± 3.6%	35%	60%	–	–	1% (Note: "Other" with 1%; would not vote with 0%)	4% (Note: Includes "Refused")

Former candidates

with Donald Trump and Michael Bloomberg

Poll source	Date(s) administered	Sample size	Margin of error	Donald Trump (R)	Michael Bloomberg (D)	Undecided
Goucher College	Feb 13–19, 2020	718 (LV)	± 3.6%	32%	59%	–

with Donald Trump and Pete Buttigieg

Poll source	Date(s) administered	Sample size	Margin of error	Donald Trump (R)	Pete Buttigieg (D)	Undecided
Goucher College	Feb 13–19, 2020	718 (LV)	± 3.6%	33%	58%	–

with Donald Trump and Tulsi Gabbard

Poll source	Date(s) administered	Sample size	Margin of error	Donald Trump (R)	Tulsi Gabbard (D)	Undecided
Goucher College	Feb 13–19, 2020	718 (LV)	± 3.6%	35%	52%	–

with Donald Trump and Amy Klobuchar

Poll source	Date(s) administered	Sample size	Margin of error	Donald Trump (R)	Amy Klobuchar (D)	Undecided
Goucher College	Feb 13–19, 2020	718 (LV)	± 3.6%	32%	59%	–

with Donald Trump and Bernie Sanders

Poll source	Date(s) administered	Sample size	Margin of error	Donald Trump (R)	Bernie Sanders (D)	Undecided
Goucher College	Feb 13–19, 2020	718 (LV)	± 3.6%	34%	61%	–

with Donald Trump and Tom Steyer

Poll source	Date(s) administered	Sample size	Margin of error	Donald Trump (R)	Tom Steyer (D)	Undecided
Goucher College	Feb 13–19, 2020	718 (LV)	± 3.6%	36%	54%	–

with Donald Trump and Elizabeth Warren

Poll source	Date(s) administered	Sample size	Margin of error	Donald Trump (R)	Elizabeth Warren (D)	Undecided
Goucher College	Feb 13–19, 2020	718 (LV)	± 3.6%	35%	59%	–

Hypothetical polling

with Donald Trump and Generic Democrat

Poll source	Date(s) administered	Sample size	Margin of error	Donald Trump (R)	Generic Democrat	Other	Undecided
Goucher College	Sep 13–18, 2019	548 (RV)	± 4.2%	28%	65%	3% (Note: "Neither Democratic nor Republican; will vote third party" with 2%; "refused" with 1%)	4%
DFM Research	Jan 19–22, 2019	500 (A)	± 4.4%	31%	53%	–	16%

=== Results ===
2020 United States presidential election in Maryland
Party	Candidate	Votes	%	±%
Democratic	Joe Biden Kamala Harris	1,985,023	65.36%	+5.03%
Republican	Donald Trump Mike Pence	976,414	32.15%	−1.76%
Libertarian	Jo Jorgensen Spike Cohen	33,488	1.10%	−1.76%
Green	Howie Hawkins Angela Walker	15,799	0.52%	−0.77%
Bread and Roses	Jerome Segal John de Graaf	5,884	0.19%	N/A
Write-in		20,422	0.67%	-0.94%
Total votes		3,037,030	100%	

==== By county ====
County	Joe Biden Democratic		Donald Trump Republican		Various candidates Other parties		Margin		Total votes cast
County	#	%	#	%	#	%	#	%	Total votes cast
Allegany	9,158	29.89%	20,886	68.16%	597	1.95%	-11,728	-38.27%	30,641
Anne Arundel	172,823	55.82%	127,821	41.28%	8,973	2.90%	45,002	14.54%	309,617
Baltimore	258,409	62.28%	146,202	35.24%	10,321	2.49%	112,207	27.04%	414,932
Baltimore City	207,260	87.28%	25,374	10.69%	4,827	2.03%	181,886	76.59%	237,461
Calvert	22,587	45.99%	25,346	51.61%	1,179	2.40%	-2,759	-5.62%	49,112
Caroline	5,095	32.26%	10,283	65.11%	416	2.63%	-5,188	-32.85%	15,794
Carroll	36,456	36.34%	60,218	60.02%	3,653	3.64%	-23,762	-23.68%	100,327
Cecil	16,809	35.42%	29,439	62.03%	1,214	2.56%	-12,630	-26.61%	47,462
Charles	62,171	69.47%	25,579	28.58%	1,748	1.95%	36,592	40.89%	89,498
Dorchester	6,857	42.92%	8,764	54.85%	356	2.23%	-1,907	-11.93%	15,977
Frederick	77,675	53.34%	63,682	43.73%	4,258	2.92%	13,993	9.61%	145,615
Garrett	3,281	21.02%	12,002	76.88%	328	2.10%	-8,721	-55.86%	15,611
Harford	63,095	42.58%	80,930	54.61%	4,161	2.81%	-17,835	-12.03%	148,186
Howard	129,433	70.70%	48,390	26.43%	5,239	2.86%	81,043	44.27%	183,062
Kent	5,329	49.37%	5,195	48.13%	270	2.50%	134	1.24%	10,794
Montgomery	419,569	78.61%	101,222	18.96%	12,952	2.43%	318,347	59.65%	533,743
Prince George's	379,208	89.26%	37,090	8.73%	8,557	2.01%	342,118	80.53%	424,855
Queen Anne's	10,709	35.35%	18,741	61.87%	840	2.77%	-8,032	-26.52%	30,290
St. Mary's	23,138	41.57%	30,826	55.38%	1,701	3.06%	-7,688	-13.81%	55,665
Somerset	4,241	41.80%	5,739	56.56%	167	1.65%	-1,498	-14.76%	10,147
Talbot	11,062	49.04%	10,946	48.53%	547	2.43%	116	0.51%	22,555
Washington	26,044	38.42%	40,224	59.35%	1,511	2.23%	-14,180	-20.93%	67,779
Wicomico	22,054	47.72%	22,944	49.65%	1,218	2.64%	-890	-1.93%	46,216
Worcester	12,560	39.63%	18,571	58.60%	560	1.77%	-6,011	-18.97%	31,691
Totals	1,985,023	65.36%	976,414	32.15%	75,593	2.49%	1,008,609	33.21%	3,037,030

Counties that flipped from Republican to Democratic

- Frederick (largest municipality: Frederick)
- Kent (largest municipality: Chestertown)
- Talbot (largest municipality: Easton)

==== By congressional district ====
Biden won seven of the state's eight congressional districts.

District	Biden	Trump	Representative
1st	39%	58%	Andy Harris
2nd	65%	32%	Dutch Ruppersberger
3rd	68%	29%	John Sarbanes
4th	79%	19%	Anthony Brown
5th	68%	29%	Steny Hoyer
6th	60%	37%	David Trone
7th	78%	20%	Kweisi Mfume
8th	69%	29%	Jamie Raskin

== Analysis ==
Biden's performance was the strongest in Maryland for any candidate since Horatio Seymour's 67.2% in 1868. In terms of statewide vote share, Trump performed worse than any Republican since 1912, when the national Republican vote was split by former President Theodore Roosevelt's third-party run; even landslide losers Herbert Hoover in 1932, Alf Landon in 1936, and Barry Goldwater in 1964 managed higher vote shares than Trump's 32.15%. Apart from 1912, only in the antebellum elections of 1856 and 1860–when the Republican Party was not yet established in the slaveholding Old Line State–did the Republican nominee perform worse than Trump did in 2020. In this election, Maryland voted 28.75% to the left of the nation at-large.

With the exception of Somerset County, every county in the state swung to Biden from Hillary Clinton's performance in 2016; many swung Democratic by double digits. It was also one of five states in the nation in which Biden's victory margin was larger than one million raw votes: the others being California, New York, Massachusetts and Illinois.

== See also ==
- United States presidential elections in Maryland
- 2020 United States presidential election
- 2020 Democratic Party presidential primaries
- 2020 Republican Party presidential primaries
- 2020 United States elections
