= Dario Hunter =

American-Israeli lawyer, rabbi, educator, and politician

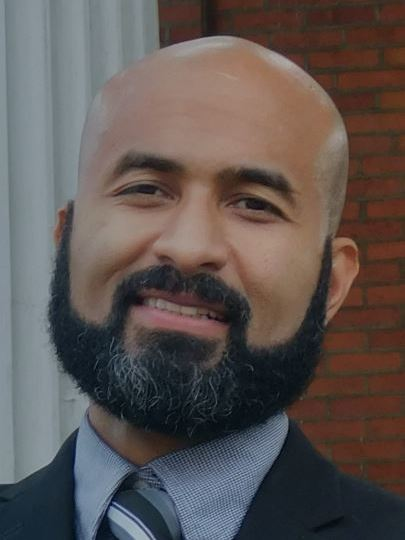

Member of the Youngstown Board of Education
- In office 2016–2020

Personal details
- Born: April 21, 1983 (age 43) Livingston, New Jersey, U.S.
- Party: Progressive (2020–present)
- Other political affiliations: Democratic (before 2017); Independent (2017–2018); Green (2018–2020)
- Education: Princeton University (BA); University of Windsor (LLB); University of Detroit (JD); Wayne State University (LLM); Jewish Spiritual Leaders Institute (Semikhah)

Dario David Hunter (born April 21, 1983), also known as Yisroel Hunter, is an American rabbi, lawyer and politician. He is the first Muslim-born man to be ordained as a rabbi. A former member of the Youngstown, Ohio, Board of Education, Hunter sought the 2020 Green Party presidential nomination, ultimately coming in second. He ran as the presidential nominee of the Oregon Progressive Party and elsewhere under the party label of Progressive Party in the 2020 United States presidential election.

== Background ==
Hunter is openly gay and was raised by his Iranian Muslim father and African American mother in Newark and Jersey City in New Jersey.

In addition to his work as an environmental attorney, he has formerly served as a congregational rabbi in Youngstown, Ohio, and a campus rabbi at the College of Wooster.

== Rabbinic career ==
Hunter converted to Judaism, first through the Reform movement and then through an Orthodox process. He was ordained as a rabbi in 2012 by the Jewish Spiritual Leaders Institute in New York City. As a rabbi, he later described himself as "very liberal and open minded."

Hunter was fired from a position as a part-time rabbi at Ohev Tzedek-Shaarei Torah synagogue after he announced his run for the Green Party presidential nomination and critical comments he made about Israel were published by Cleveland.com.

== Political career ==
=== Youngstown politics ===
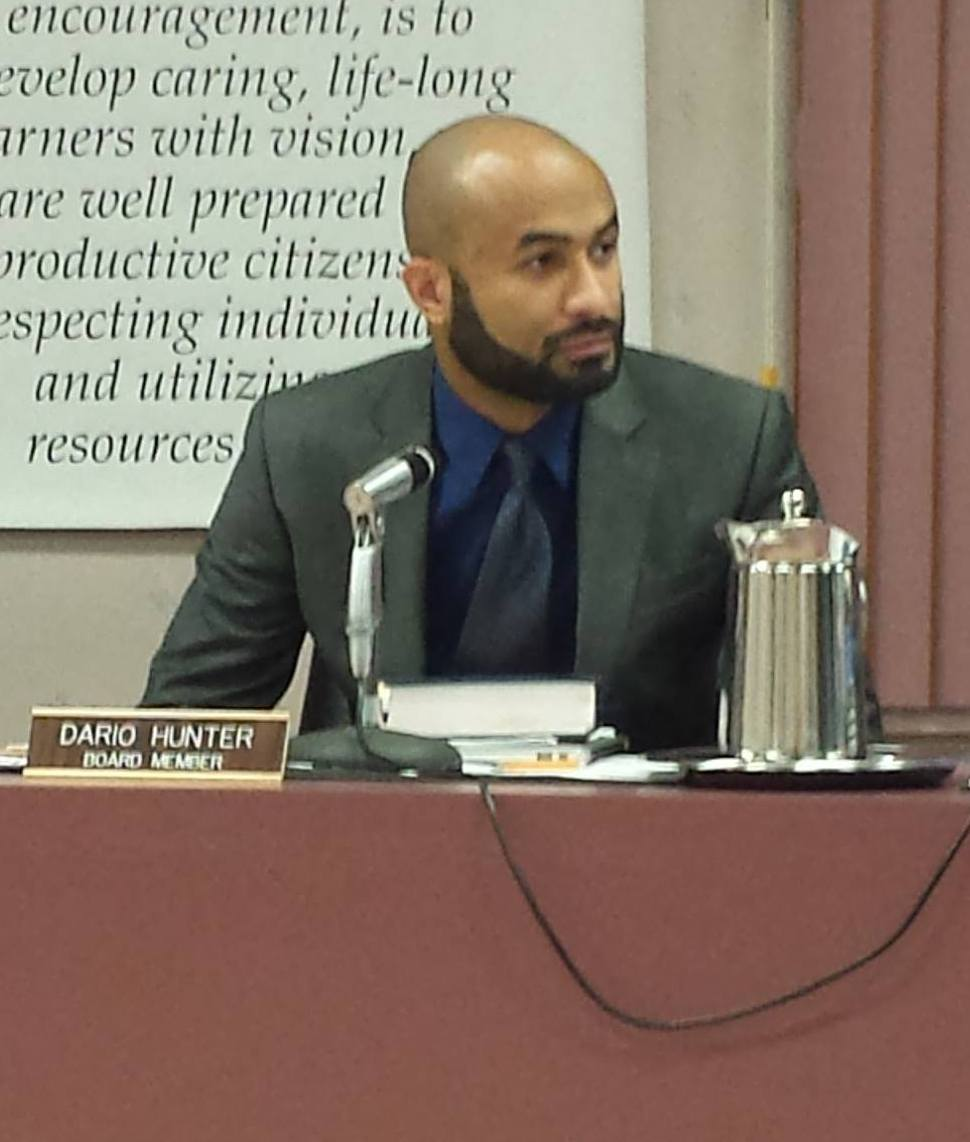
Dario Hunter as a Member of the Youngstown Board of Education.

Hunter was a Democratic Party candidate for Youngstown City Council in the 2015 primary election, where he placed third, garnering 2.9% of the vote. In the 2015 general election, he won a seat on the Youngstown Board of Education, receiving 5.0% of the vote as a write-in candidate. In May 2018, he joined the Green Party, becoming the only Green elected officeholder in Ohio.

Hunter has been noted in the media for his outspoken stances on a number of school board issues, including what he sees as the Youngstown Board of Education's responsibility for low scores on state report cards, ethics violations, nepotism, and creationism in the curriculum.

Hunter ran for re-election to the Youngstown Board of Education in 2019. He was not re-elected, earning 17.68% of the vote — less than one percent (0.53%) behind the fourth elected candidate.

== 2020 presidential campaign ==
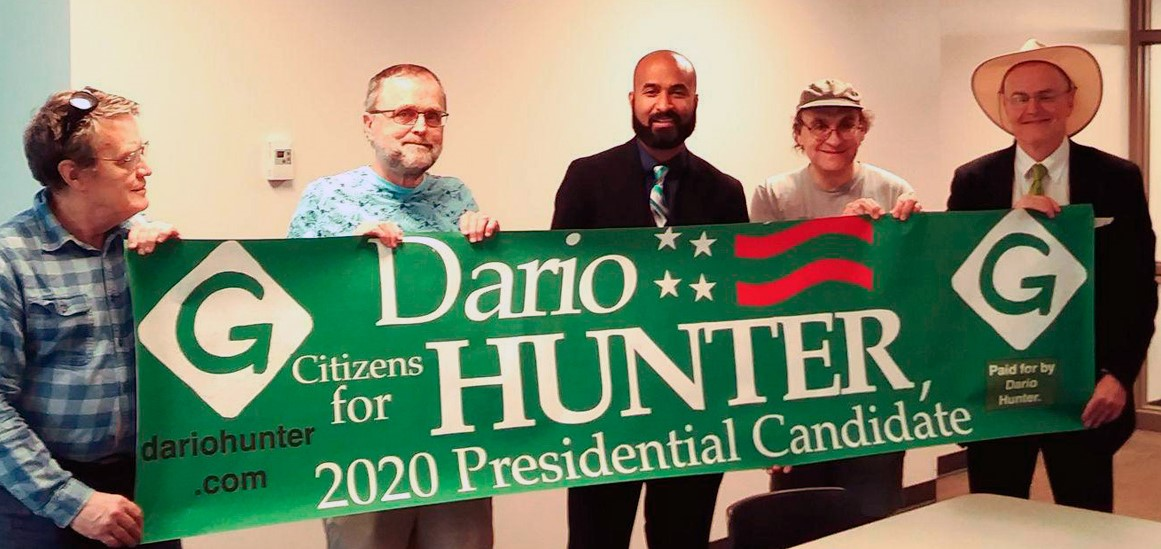
Dario Hunter campaigning in Arlington, VA in 2019.

=== Exploratory committee launch ===
On January 21, 2019, Hunter officially announced the formation of an exploratory committee to prepare for a potential run in the 2020 Green Party presidential primaries. Hunter stated that America's divisions and inequalities demanded "a real national conversation about how to change the direction of this country."

=== Announcement of candidacy ===
On February 18, 2019, Hunter officially announced his candidacy for the Green Party nomination during an event held in Pittsburgh. The New Republic referred to Hunter as "as diverse as candidates come..." Hunter stated to that publication, "If we want to cut through the lack of attention given [to Greens], we need someone who has a loud and clear voice and a tough skin." "It takes a tough skin to be an openly gay black son-of-an immigrant Jewish rabbi."

MTV.com highlighted his platform's inclusion of single-payer healthcare for all and "plans to transition the United States to renewable energy entirely."

=== Firing from synagogue over position on Israel ===
Ohev Tzedek-Shaarei Torah, the Boardman, Ohio, synagogue where Hunter served as rabbi, fired him after his comments on Israel were published in a Cleveland.com article. Hunter stated to Cleveland.com that he did "not believe the United States should be providing any form of aid to Israel or any human-rights abusers" and referred to Israel's treatment of Palestinians as "horribly atrocious". The synagogue originally attributed the dismissal to a concern that his presidential campaign would take up too much time for him to perform his duties as a rabbi. They later cited the content of Hunter's statements about Israel as a reason.

==== Bruce Zoldan's comments ====
Bruce Zoldan, CEO of Phantom Fireworks, major Trump donor and board member of Ohev Tzedek-Shaarei Torah, stated in an email to the synagogue's board, "I will finance him [Hunter] if he promises to open and manage a gay bar for former Muslims with Jewish beliefs in Ramallah." Hunter, an openly gay convert to Judaism from Islam, told The Vindicator that he was "shocked and saddened" by Zoldan's statement and called it "homophobic and anti-Muslim."

=== Campaign tour ===
Speaking to press in Carbondale, Illinois in June 2019, Hunter criticized what he saw as the use of children as "political pawns" in addressing immigration issues at the border. He called for better access to healthcare, a Bill of Rights for people of color, and vowed to end privatization in school districts. In Springfield, Missouri in August 2019, Hunter outlined an expanded Green New Deal – called the Green Path Forward – including an effort to improve diplomatic relationships with other countries, such as rivals like China and Iran, end war, stop the outsourcing of pollution and deal with environmental crises other than carbon emissions such as plastic pollution.

At a presidential debate at Ball State University, Hunter addressed systemic racism in healthcare stating, "We need to invest in making sure that we have a better healthcare infrastructure including in underserved minority communities.... We need more measurable, assessable standards for accountability to deal with the inequality in care and we need consequences." In January 2020, at a Green presidential candidate forum in Charlottesville, Virginia, Hunter stated "We need to slash the war budget... [W]e need to invest instead in peace. We need to invest in a Department of Peace for active peace building across the globe." Hunter stated that this policy goal would "lay the groundwork for how we will be instrumental as a nation in helping to save this planet – shoulder to shoulder with other nations...."

==== Visit to Israel ====
Hunter visited Haifa, Israel, the day before April Israeli elections to meet with Reem Hazzan, the campaign manager for the joint campaign of Hadash and Ta'al. His visit generated press attention in Israel, with particular emphasis given to Hunter's advocacy for Palestinian rights and his reference to the area as 'Israel-Palestine,' a term also used in the Green Party's official platform.

=== General election run ===
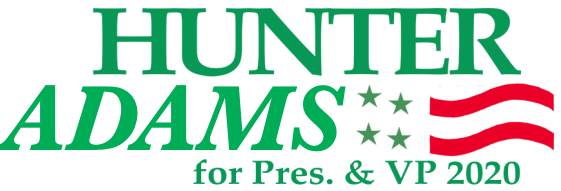
Hunter's general election campaign logo

After Howie Hawkins was nominated at the 2020 Green Party Nominating Convention, Hunter announced via Twitter that he would continue to pursue the presidency as an independent candidate, citing alleged irregularities and undemocratic processes during the Green Party presidential primary. In August, he announced he would be on the presidential ballot in the state of Colorado under the party label Progressive Party. He also named Penobscot nation activist Dawn Neptune Adams as his running-mate.

On August 25, 2020, Hunter won the nomination of the Oregon Progressive Party.

== Activism ==
=== Legal actions ===
In 2017, Hunter filed a lawsuit against the Youngstown City School District in the Ohio Supreme Court for failing to provide public records. His request focused on a company contracted to hire principals for the district. The district settled with Hunter, providing the records and paying him costs. Hunter planned to donate the $100 awarded for court fees to the Boys and Girls Club.

In 2018, Hunter sued the Ohio Department of Education in the Ohio Supreme Court for failing to provide public records on an investigation into Youngstown's CEO for alleged inappropriate conduct. The Department of Education settled with Hunter, providing the records and paying towards his costs.

== Electoral history ==
2015 Youngstown city council (Ward 6) Democratic primary election
Party	Candidate	Votes	%
Democratic	Anita Davis	457	67.11
Democratic	Christine Silvestri	204	29.96
Democratic	Dario Hunter	20	2.94
Total votes		681	100.00

2015 Youngstown city school district election Voters Choose Four
Name	Votes	Percent	Outcome
Brenda Kimble, non-partisan	6,695	37.59%	Hold
Michael Murphy, non-partisan	5,613	31.51%	Hold
Corrine Sanderson, non-partisan	3,545	19.90%	Gain
Dario Hunter, write-in	885	4.97%	Gain
Tina Cvetkovich, write-in	425	2.39%	Loss
Tyrone Peakes II, write-in	410	2.30%	Loss
Rick Alli, write-in	238	1.34%	Loss

2017 Clerk of the Municipal Court, Youngstown General election
Party	Candidate	Votes	%
Democratic	Sarah Brown-Clark	7,915	73.22
Independent	Dario Hunter	2,894	26.78
Total votes		10,809	100.00

2019 Youngstown city school district election Nonpartisan election Voters Choose Four
Name	Votes	Percent	Outcome
Tiffany D. Patterson	3,632	22.58%	Gain
Brenda Kimble	3,438	21.37%	Hold
Juanita Walker	3,243	20.16%	Gain
Barbara Brothers	2,930	18.21%	Gain
Dario Hunter	2,845	17.68%	Loss
