= 2010 California Proposition 14 =

Ballot initiative

Proposition 14
- Primary Election Participation

Results
Choice	Votes	%
Yes	2,868,945	53.73%
No	2,470,658	46.27%
Valid votes	5,339,603	94.43%
Invalid or blank votes	315,210	5.57%
Total votes	5,654,813	100.00%
Registered voters/turnout	16,977,031	33.31%
- County results No: 50–60% Yes: 50–60% 60–70%

Proposition 14 is a California ballot proposition that appeared on the ballot during the June 2010 state elections. It was a constitutional amendment that effectively transformed California's non-presidential elections from first-past-the-post to a nonpartisan blanket primary (a two-round system). The proposition was legislatively referred to voters by the State Legislature and approved by 54% of the voters. It consolidated all partisan primaries for a particular office into an election with one ballot that would be identical to all voters, regardless of their party preferences. The two candidates with the most votes in the primary election would then be the only candidates who would run in the general election, regardless of their party affiliation.

== Background ==
Proposition 14 was a proposal to amend Sections 5 and 6 of Article II of the California State Constitution relating to elections. It is officially known as the Top Two Primaries Act.

It was authored by State Senator Abel Maldonado, who represented the 15th district, as Senate Constitutional Amendment 4 of the 2009–2010 Regular Session (Resolution Chapter 2, Statutes of 2009). It was based on a proposal drafted by the Independent Voter Project in 2008. It was passed in the State Senate by a vote of 27 to 12 and in the State Assembly by a vote of 54 to 20. The proposition was publicly backed by Governor Arnold Schwarzenegger, as part of a deal in which Maldonado agreed to support his proposed 2009–2010 state budget, and was opposed by political parties.

== Provisions ==
The passage of Proposition 14 changed the way that elections are conducted for all statewide offices in California (including the governor and other executive positions, members of the State Legislature, and members of the State Board of Equalization), as well as for United States Senators and members of the United States House of Representatives. Proposition 14 does not affect the election of president and vice president of the United States, local offices, or non-partisan offices such as judges and the Superintendent of Public Instruction.

Instead of allowing each political party to hold a partisan primary open to just its members (and independent voters, if the party chooses to do so) to determine its candidate for the general election, Proposition 14 proposed to create a single primary ballot that would be identical for all voters. All candidates running in the primary election, regardless of their political party preference (if any), would appear on that ballot. The two candidates with the most votes would then qualify for the general election, regardless of which party they identify with (if any).

Proposition 14 specifically prohibits write-in candidates in the second round.

The provisions of Proposition 14 do not apply to presidential primaries, leaving presidential primaries as semi-closed whereby voters can register with any party up to two weeks prior to election day, or at the polling place, to vote in the presidential primary of the party of their choice. As of the 2024 presidential primary, three political parties in California (the California Democratic Party, the California Libertarian Party, and the American Independent Party) allow voters who are not registered with any party to vote in their party's presidential primaries. However, the voters not registered with any party must specifically request a ballot for one of those parties in order to vote in those parties' presidential primaries.

== Results ==
Proposition 14
Choice	Votes	%
For	2,868,945	53.73
Against	2,470,658	46.27
Total	5,339,603	100.00
Valid votes	5,339,603	94.43
Invalid/blank votes	315,210	5.57
Total votes	5,654,813	100.00
Registered voters/turnout	16,977,031	33.31

== Court challenge and ruling ==
The constitutionality of the measure was challenged in Field et al. v. Bowen et al.

The plaintiffs represented a broad spectrum of the body politic in California:

- Mona Field, a professor of political science at Glendale Community College and elected member of the board of trustees of the Los Angeles Community College District
- Richard Winger, a Libertarian who publishes Ballot Access News
- Stephan A. Chessin, a Democrat who is chair of Californians for Electoral Reform
- Jennifer Wozniak, an organizing and field service coordinator for the Laborers' International Union of North America, Local 777
- Jeff Mackler, a 2006 write-in senatorial candidate for Socialist Action (U.S.)
- Rodney Martin.

On September 19, 2011, an appellate court ruled that the "Top Two" system was constitutional. The case then returned to the Superior Court of San Francisco County.

On August 1, 2012, Judge Curtis Karnow awarded $243,279 in legal fees not to the nominal defendants in the case, which were officials of the State of California represented by the Attorney General, but to independent attorneys supporting Prop 14.

The original plaintiffs then asked for reconsideration of this award. On Friday afternoon, September 14, 2012, the date for the reconsideration hearing was advanced to September 17, before the same judge who had awarded the $243,279. Plaintiff Winger called the award and the acceleration of the reconsideration hearing "outrageous" and "punitive." Election-law expert Richard L. Hasen, although an opponent of the suit, agreed, writing that the award was "absolutely outrageous." This award has been called a SLAPP (strategic lawsuit against public participation) action, "intended to censor, intimidate, and silence critics by burdening them with the cost of a legal defense until they abandon their criticism or opposition."

The Motion for Reconsideration was reassigned to Judge Harold E. Kahn, and continued to September 25, then October 3, then 22, and then 24, 2012. The case was reassigned to Judge Karnow who ruled against the motion for reconsideration in October 2012.
