= Christina Tobin =

American political activist (born 1981)

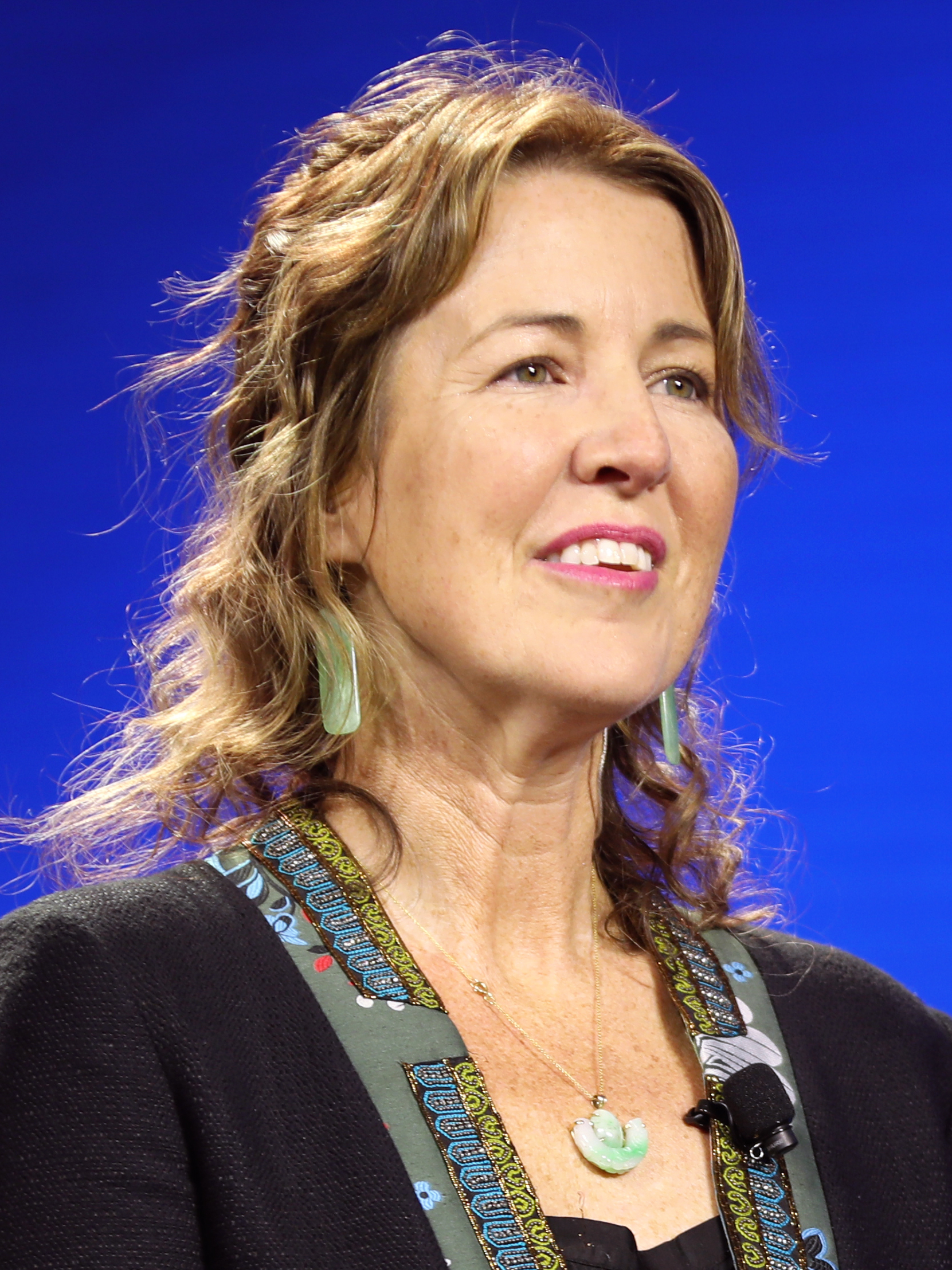
- Tobin in 2024
- Born: Christina Marie Tobin; June 17, 1981 (age 45); Pasadena, Texas, U.S.
- Education: Saint Mary's University of Minnesota
- Occupations: Activist; ballot access specialist
- Known for: Chair of the Free & Equal Elections Foundation
- Political party: Independent
- Parent: Jim Tobin (father)

Christina Marie Tobin (born June 17, 1981) is an American activist and ballot access specialist. She is the founder and chair of the Free & Equal Elections Foundation, and president and chief executive officer of Free and Equal, Inc.

== Early life and education ==
Tobin was born in Pasadena, Texas, in 1981. Her father is political activist Jim Tobin. She grew up in Texas and Illinois and graduated from Fenwick High School in Oak Park, Illinois. She attended Saint Mary's University in Winona, Minnesota, where she served as varsity tennis captain and volunteered for Habitat for Humanity. In 2004, she earned a bachelor's degree in graphic design with a minor in business marketing. As of 2024, Tobin claims to have never voted for any presidential candidate, as none had aligned enough with her personal views to earn her vote.

== Career and activism ==
=== Ballot access ===
In the 2004 presidential election, Tobin sued Democratic State Chair Michael Madigan, alleging that he used his full-time state employees to have Ralph Nader removed from the Illinois ballot.

In 2008, Tobin served as Ralph Nader's national ballot access coordinator.

In 2008, Tobin founded the Free & Equal Elections Foundation, a 501(c)(3) non-profit. Free & Equal hosts open gubernatorial, presidential, and senatorial debates, including 2008, 2012, 2016, 2020 and 2024 Presidential debates. Presidential debate moderators have included journalist Chris Hedges, broadcaster Larry King, political commentator Thom Hartmann, and actor Ed Asner.

In March 2009, Tobin founded Free and Equal, Inc., a ballot access, consulting, and petitioning firm that specializes in independent and third-party candidates.

=== Other activism ===
In 2011, Tobin served as Vice President of Taxpayers United of America, founded by her father, James Tobin.

In 2012, Tobin founded Stop Top Two, an organization opposed to top two primary systems, in which a nonpartisan primary is held, and the two candidates with the highest vote totals are then entered into a runoff election.

=== Bali Jewel Inc. lawsuit ===
In 2007, Tobin was president of a jewelry company that filed suit against John Hardy Limited as part of a dispute over design copyrights. The case was dismissed.

=== California Secretary of State candidacy ===
In 2010, Tobin ran as the Libertarian Party candidate for California Secretary of State. She was the only candidate seeking the Libertarian Party nomination. Richard Winger, editor and publisher of Ballot Access News, was her campaign manager. In the general election, Tobin came in fourth with 214,347 votes, or 2.3 percent of the total votes cast.
