= Electoral reform in North Carolina =

U.S. state electoral reform

Electoral reform in North Carolina refers to efforts to change the voting and election laws in the Tar Heel State.

== Instant runoff voting ==
Cary, North Carolina was scheduled to hold its first ranked-choice voting (RCV) / instant runoff voting (IRV) election on October 9, 2007, and Hendersonville, North Carolina was scheduled to use RCV/IRV for the first time on November 6, 2007. Wake County, North Carolina had chosen Cary as a test site for the system.

== Electoral College ==
In 2007, bills were introduced to join the National Popular Vote Interstate Compact and award the state's 15 electoral votes to the winner of the nationwide popular vote, but these bills did not become law.

== Ballot access reform ==
=== 2009 ===
In 2009 a bill was introduced by North Carolina State Senator Jim Jacumin on March 19, 2009 as SB731, the Electoral Freedom Act of 2009. Soon after North Carolina State Senator Andrew C. Brock signed on as a Co-Sponsor of the Electoral Freedom Act. On March 24, 2009 the bill was referred to the Senate Committee on the Judiciary I, where was never brought back up and died in committee when it missed the legislative cross over deadline for non-appropriation/budget bills. The goal of the Electoral Freedom Act of 2009 was to amend NC Election Law in NCGS Chapter 163 to reduce the number of signatures needed for third political parties and unaffiliated candidates to obtain access to the NC election ballot.

=== 2011 ===
In 2011 the Free the Vote North Carolina geared up for an electoral reform legislative project, which by and large was a reviving of the bill introduced in 2009 and with some new additions, the Electoral Freedom Act of 2011 (Bill Proposal PDF). The goal of the Electoral Freedom Act of 2011 was to amend NC Election Law in NCGS Chapter 163 to reduce the number of signatures needed for third political parties and unaffiliated candidates to obtain access to the NC election ballot as well as eliminating the current requirement for write-in candidates to obtain signatures to have votes cast for them counted. The bill had the support of many political parties in North Carolina including the American Centrist Party of North Carolina which issued a press release in support of the bill proposal.

=== 2021 ===
In 2021 Local Chapter of STAR_voting has been organized working toward implementing STAR Voting method in North Carolina.

In STAR Voting, voters are given a score, or ratings ballot, on which each voter scores every candidate with a number from 0 to 5, where 0 representing "worst" and 5 representing "best." The scores for each candidate are then summed, and the two highest-scored candidates are selected as finalists. In the automatic-runoff round, the finalist who was given a higher score on a greater number of ballots is selected as the winner.

== See also ==
- Elections in North Carolina
