= Free & Equal Elections Foundation =

American nonprofit organization

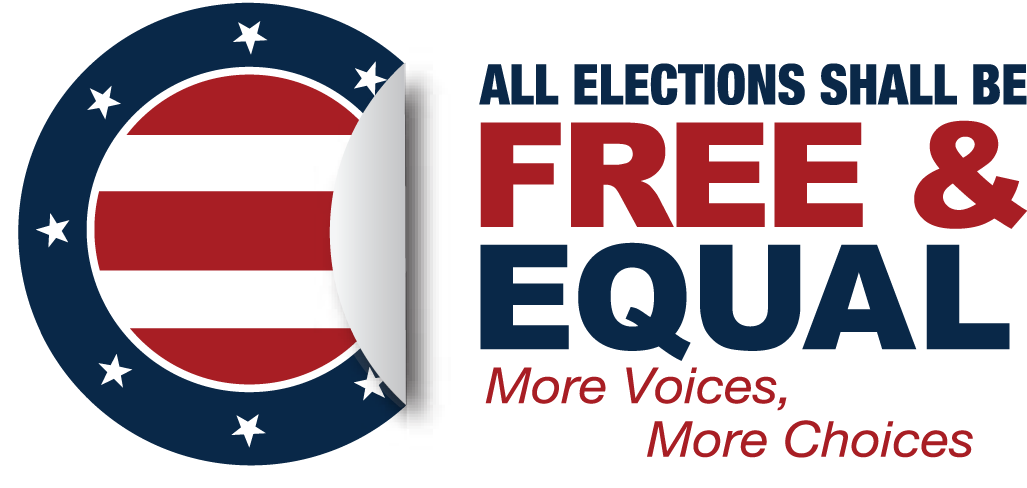
Free and Equal Elections Foundation Logo and Tagline

The Free & Equal Elections Foundation (Free & Equal) is a 501(c)(3) non-profit, non-partisan organization in the United States, the mission of which is to empower American voters through education and advocacy of electoral reforms.

== Presidential debates ==
=== 2008 ===
During the 2008 presidential election, Free & Equal hosted a presidential debate at the Mayflower Renaissance Hotel in Washington, D.C., on October 23, 2008. Constitution Party candidate Chuck Baldwin and independent candidate Ralph Nader participated in a debate moderated by journalist Chris Hedges.

Free & Equal debates, 2008
N°	Date	Host	Location	Moderators	Participants					
P Participant N Non-invitee A Absent invitee					Democratic	Republican	Libertarian	Green	Constitution	Independent
P Participant N Non-invitee A Absent invitee					Senator Barack Obama of Illinois	Senator John McCain of Arizona	Congressman Bob Barr of Georgia	Congresswoman Cynthia McKinney of Georgia	Pastor Chuck Baldwin of Florida	Advocate Ralph Nader of Connecticut
1	October 23, 2008	Mayflower Hotel	Washington, D.C.	Chris Hedges	A	A	A	A	P	P

=== 2012 ===
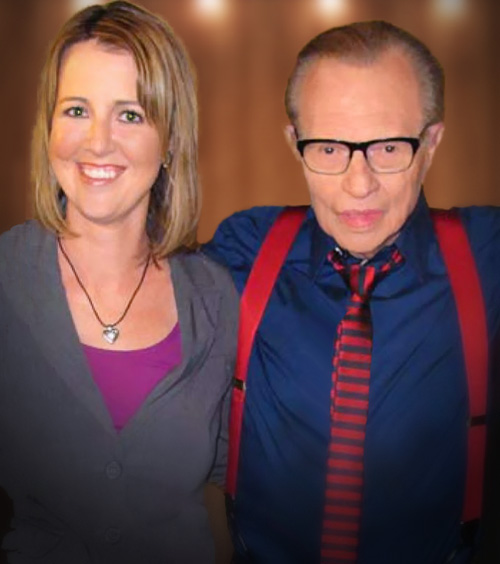
Free & Equal's 2012 "Open Presidential Debate" was moderated by Christina Tobin (left) and Larry King (right).

In 2012, Free & Equal sponsored an October 23, 2012 debate among four third party candidates for President of the United States, moderated by former Larry King Live host Larry King and Christina Tobin. It was televised by RT TV, Al Jazeera English, and C-SPAN. A second debate, between Green Party nominee Jill Stein and Libertarian Party nominee Gary Johnson, was held on November 5, 2012.

Free & Equal debates, 2012
N°	Date	Host	Location	Moderator	Participants					
P Participant. N Non-invitee. A Absent invitee.					Democratic	Republican	Libertarian	Green	Constitution	Justice
P Participant. N Non-invitee. A Absent invitee.					President Barack Obama of Illinois	Governor Mitt Romney of Massachusetts	Governor Gary Johnson of New Mexico	Doctor Jill Stein of Massachusetts	Congressman Virgil Goode of Virginia	Mayor Rocky Anderson of Utah
1	October 23, 2012	Hilton Chicago	Chicago, Illinois	Larry King of Ora.TV	A	A	P	P	P	P
2	November 5, 2012	RT America	Washington, D.C.	Thom Hartmann of RT	N	N	P	P	N	N

=== 2016 ===
Free & Equal hosted an open debate along with Student Voices Count at the University of Colorado Boulder's Macky Auditorium on October 25, 2016. All candidates with ballot lines representing at least fifteen percent of potential voters were invited to attend.

Free & Equal debates, 2016
N°	Date	Host	Location	Moderators	Invited participants							
P Participant. A Absent invitee.					Republican	Democratic	Libertarian	Green	Constitution	Reform	PSL	Independent
P Participant. A Absent invitee.					Businessman Donald Trump of New York	Secretary Hillary Clinton of New York	Governor Gary Johnson of New Mexico	Doctor Jill Stein of Massachusetts	Lieutenant Darrell Castle of Tennessee	Businessman Rocky De La Fuente of California	Activist Gloria La Riva of California	Director Evan McMullin of Utah
1	October 25, 2016	University of Colorado Boulder	Boulder, Colorado	Ed Asner	A	A	A	A	P	P	P	A

=== 2020 ===
==== Primaries ====
Early on March 4, 2020, the Free & Equal Elections Foundation held a debate at the Hilton Chicago Hotel. Various third-party candidates, as well as minor candidates affiliated with the Democratic and Republican parties attended.

2020 Free & Equal debates
No.	Date & Time	Location	Moderators	Invited participants								
P Participant.				Democratic	Libertarian			Green	Constitution	American Solidarity	Life and Liberty	Transhumanist
P Participant.				Businessman Mark Stewart of Connecticut	Activist Dan Berhman of Texas	Carpenter Erik Gerhardt of Pennsylvania	LNC Vice Chair Arvin Vohra of Maryland	Activist Sedinam Moyowasifza-Curry of California	Financial Advisor Charles Kraut of Virginia	Educator Brian Carroll of California	Activist J.R. Myers of Alaska	Activist Ben Zion of Arizona
1a	March 4, 2020; 2:00 pm CST	Chicago, Illinois	Christina Tobin	P	P	P	P	P	P	P	P	P
P Participant.				Republican	Democratic	Libertarian				Green / Socialist	PSL	Independent
P Participant.				Futurist Zoltan Istvan of California	Attorney Mosie Boyd of Arkansas	Lieutenant Ken Armstrong of Hawaii	Lecturer Jo Jorgensen of South Carolina	Corporal Adam Kokesh of Indiana	Activist Vermin Supreme of Massachusetts	Tradesman Howie Hawkins of New York	Activist Gloria La Riva of California	Activist Mark Charles of the District of Columbia
1b	March 4, 2020; 6:30 pm CST	Chicago, Illinois	Christina Tobin	P	P	P	P	P	P	P	P	P

==== General election ====
Two debates were held prior to the general election. The first was on October 8, 2020, in Denver, Colorado, with only candidates on the ballot in at least eight states eligible to participate. A second debate open to the same group of candidates occurred on October 24, 2020, in Cheyenne, Wyoming.

2020 Free & Equal debates
No.	Date & Time	Location	Moderators	Invited participants									
P Participant. A Absent Invitee.				Republican	Democratic	Libertarian	Green / Socialist	PSL	Alliance / Reform	Constitution	American Solidarity	Independent	
P Participant. A Absent Invitee.				President Donald Trump of Florida	Former Vice President Joe Biden of Delaware	Lecturer Jo Jorgensen of South Carolina	Tradesman Howie Hawkins of New York	Activist Gloria La Riva of California	Businessman Rocky De La Fuente of California	Businessman Don Blankenship of West Virginia	Educator Brian Carroll of California	Entrepreneur Brock Pierce of Puerto Rico	Producer Kanye West of Wyoming
2	October 8, 2020; 6:00 pm MDT	Denver, Colorado	Christina Tobin	A	A	A	P	P	A	P	P	P	A
3	October 24, 2020; 6:00 pm MDT	Cheyenne, Wyoming	Christina Tobin	A	A	A	P	P	A	A	P	P	A

=== 2024 ===
==== Primaries ====
On January 18, 2024, the Free & Equal Elections Foundation held its first ever Democratic Party primary debate. Candidates were invited if they had ballot access in at least four states. Although eight candidates were invited, only Gabriel Cornejo, Frankie Lozada, Stephen Lyons, and Jason Palmer participated.

On February 29, 2024 Free & Equal held its first independent presidential debate, with two Libertarian candidates (Chase Oliver and Lars Mapstead), two Green Party candidates (Jill Stein and Jasmine Sherman) (also nominee of The Unicorn Party), and Party for Socialism and Liberation nominee Claudia De la Cruz. Independent candidates Robert F. Kennedy Jr and Cornel West were invited but declined to attend.

2024 Free & Equal debates
No.	Date & Time	Location	Moderators	Invited participants							
P Participant. A Absent Invitee.				Democratic							
P Participant. A Absent Invitee.				President Joe Biden of Delaware	Entrepreneur Gabriel Cornejo of New York	Entrepreneur Frankie Lozada of New York	Plumber Stephen Lyons of California	Entrepreneur Jason Palmer of Maryland	Congressman Dean Phillips of Minnesota	Media host Cenk Uygur of California	Author Marianne Williamson of California
1	January 18, 2024; 6:00 pm PDT	Los Angeles, California	Christina Tobin Kwame Jackson	A	P	P	P	P	A	A	A
P Participant. A Absent Invitee.				Libertarian		Green		PSL	Independent		
P Participant. A Absent Invitee.				Businessman Lars Mapstead of California	Sales executive Chase Oliver of Georgia	Activist Jasmine Sherman of North Carolina	Doctor Jill Stein of Massachusetts	Activist Claudia De la Cruz of New York	Attorney Robert F. Kennedy Jr. of California	Academic Cornel West of California	
2	February 29, 2024; 8:00 pm EDT	New York City, New York	Jason Palmer; Caitlin Sinclair; Christina Tobin	P	P	P	P	P	A	A	

==== Presidential debates ====
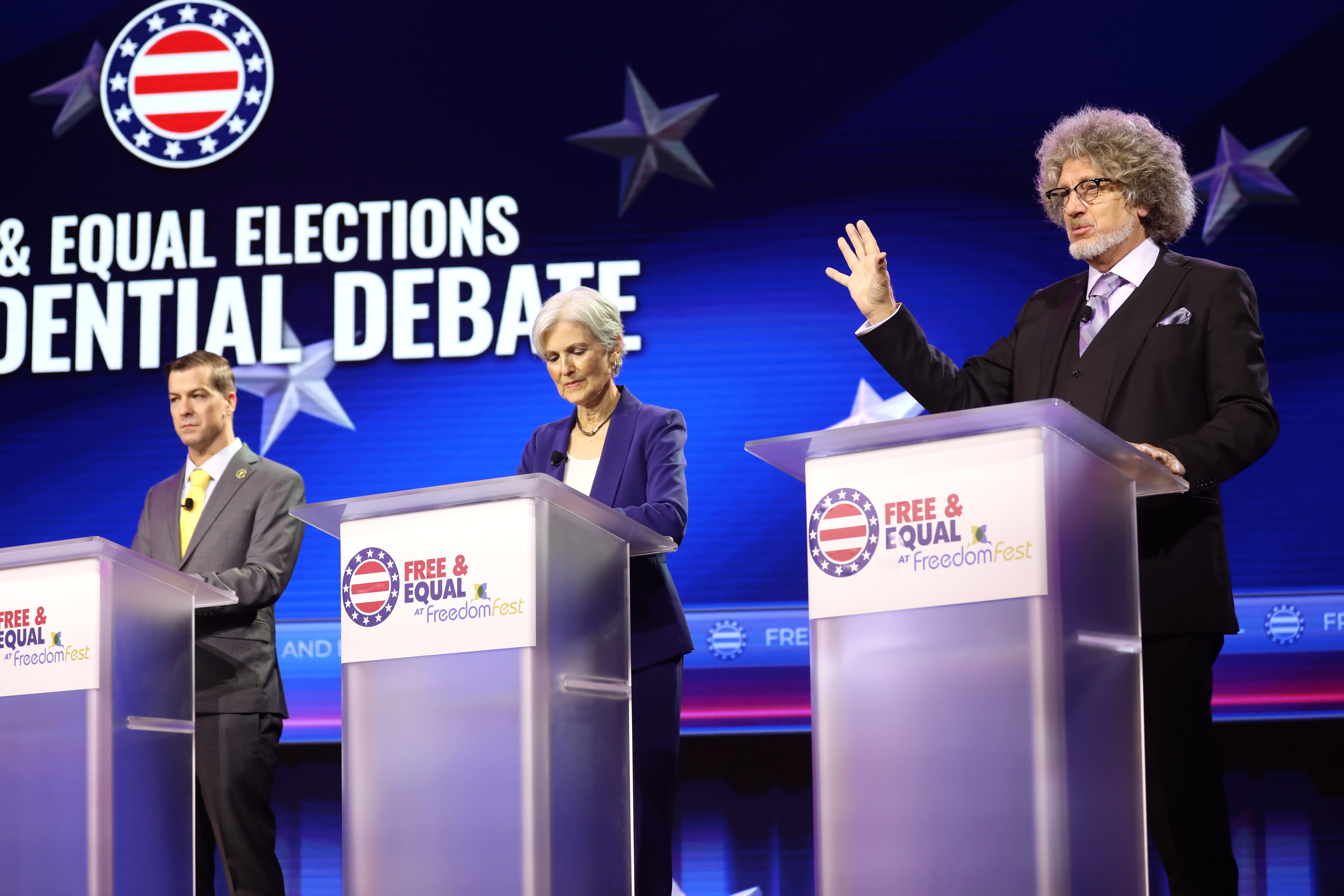
From left to right: Oliver, Stein, and Terry at the Free and Equal debate in Las Vegas.

Free and Equal hosted a second debate on July 12, 2024, at FreedomFest in Las Vegas, Nevada, moderated by the foundation's chair, Christina Tobin and congressman Thomas Massie. Biden, Kennedy, Oliver, Stein, Randall Terry, Trump and West were invited to the debate, while Oliver, Stein, and Terry participated.

Free and Equal hosted a third debate on October 23, 2024, in Los Angeles, California, moderated by the foundation's chair, Christina Tobin and former U.S. Comptroller General David Walker. Chase Oliver, Jill Stein, Randall Terry, Claudia De la Cruz, Kamala Harris, Donald Trump, and Cornel West were invited. Oliver, Stein, and Terry participated again.

== Electoral reform symposia ==
Since 2009, Free & Equal has hosted electoral reform symposia to unite intellectuals and experts to share and debate reforms to the U.S. electoral system. Past panelists and speakers include president of the League of Women Voters of Colorado Nancy Crow, deputy secretary of state of Colorado Suzanne Staiert, FairVote founder Rob Richie, Nexus Earth founder Colin Cantrell, and Ballot Access News founder Richard Winger.

== United We Stand tour ==
In 2014, Free & Equal launched United We Stand, a festival and tour uniting the younger generations with musicians, artists, and thought leaders to promote political and cultural change. Since its inception, the tour has made stops at Belasco Theater in Los Angeles in 2014 and 2015, University of Colorado Boulder in 2016, and Texas A&M University in 2018. The 2019 tour included Indiana, Texas, Colorado, Oregon, and Tennessee.
