= Jim Tobin (activist) =

American economist and former teacher (1945–2021)

- Born: James Tobin; October 23, 1945; Chicago, Illinois, U.S.
- Died: December 15, 2021 (aged 76); Berwyn, Illinois, U.S.
- Education: Saint Joseph's College (BA); Northern Illinois University (MA)
- Occupations: Economist; educator
- Known for: Founder of Taxpayers United of America
- Children: Christina

James Tobin (October 23, 1945 – December 15, 2021) was an American economist and educator who was the founder of Taxpayers United of America. He was also the father of Christina Tobin, the Chair of Free & Equal Elections Foundation.

== Early life ==
Tobin was born in Chicago, Illinois. He earned a B.A. in economics with a minor in finance at St. Joseph College. After college, Tobin studied American history and earned an M.A. in international economics from Northern Illinois University in DeKalb.

== Career ==
Tobin began his career at the Federal Reserve Bank of Chicago. He spent nine years as a Federal Reserve Bank Examiner, specializing in international finance.

In 1976, Tobin founded Taxpayers United of America. He has appeared on radio and TV programs including ABC, CBS, FOX, WGN and NBC news programs. His tax cutting activities have been the subject of articles by newspapers including the Chicago Tribune, the New York Times, Washington Post, Newsweek, U.S. News & World Report, and the Chicago Sun Times.

From 1979 to 1999, Tobin taught economics at Elmhurst College in Elmhurst, Illinois.

=== Tax relief efforts ===
Tobin was a proponent of a flat rate income tax of 10 percent. His Chicago-based organization, Taxpayers United of America, actively supported the 1981 federal income tax cut and federal income tax indexing. Tobin also supports the proposed balanced budget Amendment to the U.S. Constitution.

=== Illinois gubernatorial race ===
In 2002, Tobin ran for lieutenant governor representing the Libertarian Party of Illinois, with State Representative Cal Skinner running for governor. Tobin's daughter, election reform activist Christina Tobin, successfully defended 55,000 signatures for that race. Tobin lost.
