= Coalition for Free and Open Elections =

U.S. nonpartisan organization aiming to promote fair ballot access

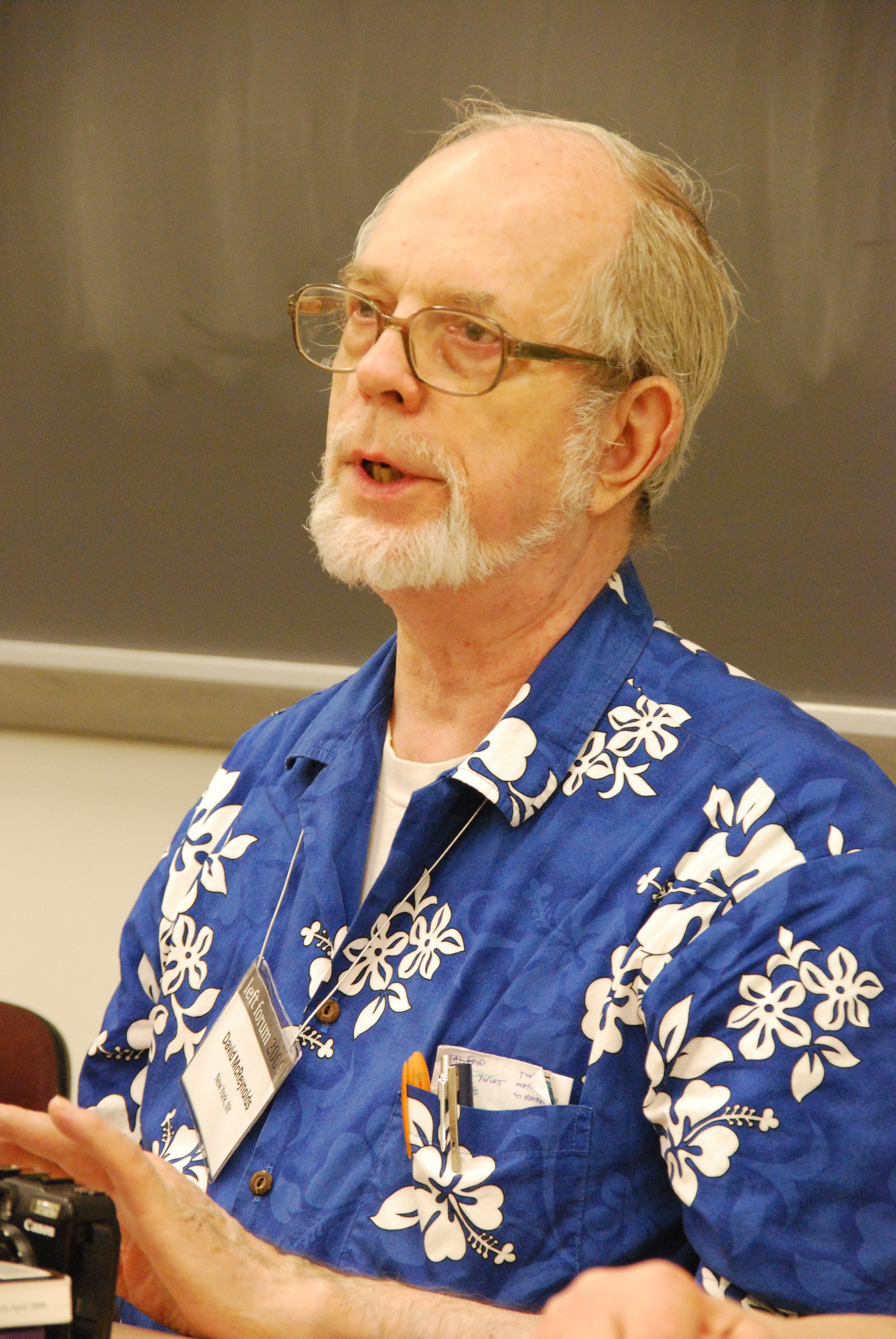
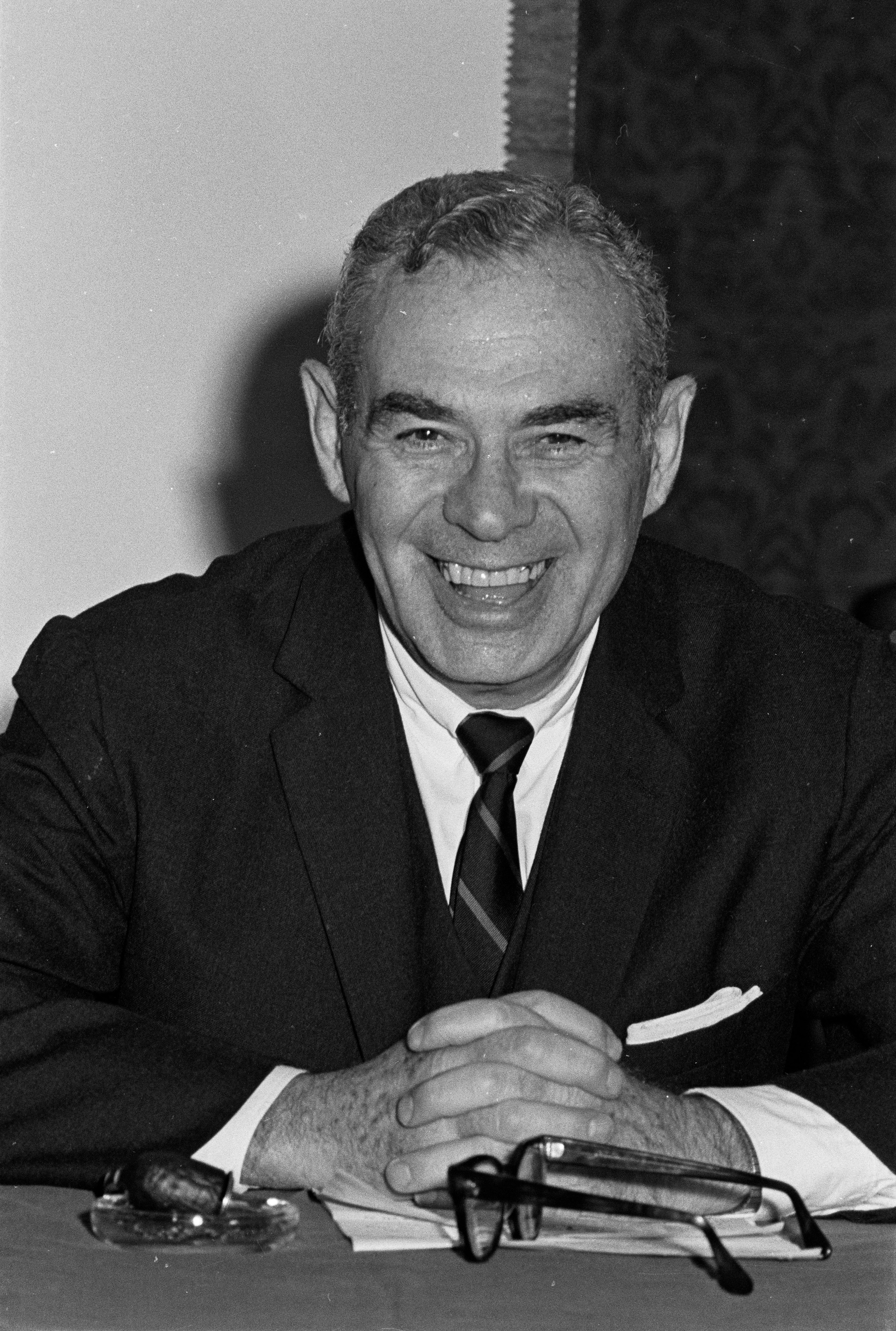
David McReynolds (left) and Si Gerson, of the Socialist Party USA and Communist Party USA, respectively, early leaders of COFOE

The Coalition for Free and Open Elections (COFOE) is a nonpartisan organization in the United States that aims to promote fair ballot access. COFOE was founded in 1985, when representatives from across the political spectrum met in the New York City law office of former U.S. Attorney General Ramsey Clark.

Participants in the early days of COFOE included political independents and members of the Citizens Party; the Communist Party; the Libertarian Party; the New Alliance Party; the Prohibition Party; and the Socialist Party USA. One of the early chairs of COFOE was Socialist David McReynolds, who was succeeded by Ann Rosenhaft and then by Si Gerson of the Communist Party. It has largely been due to the steadfast work of Richard Winger, editor and publisher of Ballot Access News, that COFOE has survived, and grown, as an organization.

COFOE has filed amicus briefs in numerous court cases relating to ballot access. As of August 2021, members of COFOE include the American Solidarity Party; the Constitution Party; FairVote; the Green Party; Independent Voting; the Libertarian Party; the Prohibition Party; the Reform Party, and the Socialist Party USA.

== Related organizations ==
In the late 1990s a national ballot access organization with a focus similar to that of COFOE held several meetings in the Washington, D.C., area, attended by members of the Green Party, Libertarian Party, Natural Law Party, Reform Party, Socialist Party USA, various independents, and others. This new national ballot access coalition discussed the possibility of formally constituting a tax-exempt civic organization for purposes of ballot access litigation and education; at one point some participants in this group considered borrowing the COFOE name.
