= Ballot access =

Aspect of United States election law

Ballot access is rules and procedures regulating the right to candidacy, the conditions under which a candidate, political party, or ballot measure is entitled to appear on voters' ballots in elections in the United States.

The jurisprudence of the right to candidacy and right to create a political party are less clear than voting rights in the United States. However, the U.S. Supreme Court has established in multiple cases that the federal constitution does not recognize a fundamental right to candidacy, and that state governments have a legitimate government interest in blocking "frivolous or fraudulent candidacies". As election processes are decentralized by Article I, Section 4, of the United States Constitution, ballot access laws are established and enforced by the states. As a result, ballot access processes may vary from one state to another.

State access requirements for candidates generally pertain to personal qualities of a candidate, such as: minimum age, residency, and citizenship. Additionally, many states require prospective candidates to collect a specified number of qualified voters' signatures on petitions of support and mandate the payment of filing fees before granting access; ballot measures are similarly regulated (as is the wording and format of petitions as well). Each state also regulates how political parties qualify for automatic ballot access, and how those minor parties that do not can. Fundamental to democracy, topics related to ballot access are the subject of considerable debate in the United States.

In order to get on the ballot, a candidate, political party, or ballot measure must meet various requirements. The Elections Clause in Article I of the Constitution states that "the Times, Places and Manner of holding Elections for Senators and Representatives, shall be prescribed in each state by the Legislature thereof." Consequently, each state may design its own unique criteria for ballot access. The United States is one of the few nations that do not have uniform national laws on ballot access.

== Arguments ==
The primary argument put forward by States for restricting ballot access has been the presumption that setting ballot access criteria too low would result in numerous candidates on the ballot, splitting the votes. Example: With plurality voting, as in the case of first-past-the-post, the candidate with the most votes wins, even if the candidate does not have a majority of the votes. Suppose 55% Belief A and 45% Belief B vote in a district. If two candidates appeal to A, but only one appeals to B, the votes of A could split between the two A candidates, say 25% vote for one and 30% for the other, giving the B candidate the office although 55% preferred to see an A candidate in the office. However, proponents of ballot access reform say that reasonably easy access to the ballot does not lead to a glut of candidates, even where many candidates do appear on the ballot. The 1880s reform movement that led to officially designed secret ballots, such as the Australian ballot, had some salutary effects, but it also gave the government control over who could be on the ballot. As historian Peter Argersinger has pointed out, the reform that empowered officials to regulate access onto the ballot, also carried the danger that this power would be abused by officialdom and that legislatures controlled by established political parties, would enact restrictive ballot access laws to ensure re-election of their party's candidates.

Perhaps the most prominent advocate of the 1880s ballot reform movement, John Henry Wigmore, suggested that "ten signatures" might be an appropriate requirement for nomination to the official ballot for a legislative office. In the 20th century, ballot access laws imposing signature requirements far more restrictive than Wigmore had envisioned were enacted by many state legislatures; in many cases, the two major parties wrote the laws such that the burdens created by these new ballot access requirements (usually in the form of difficult signature-gathering nominating petition drives) fell on alternative candidates, but not on major party candidates. Proponents of more open ballot access argue that restricting ballot access has the effect of unjustly restricting the choices available to voters, and typically disadvantages third party candidates and other candidates who are not affiliated with the established parties.

President George H. W. Bush signed the Copenhagen Document of the Helsinki Accords that states in part:

(7.5) – respect the right of citizens to seek political or public office, individually or as representatives of political parties or organizations, without discrimination; (7.6) – respect the right of individuals and groups to establish, in full freedom, their own political parties or other political organizations and provide such political parties and organizations with the necessary legal guarantees to enable them to compete with each other on a basis of equal treatment before the law and by the authorities;...

The Organization for Security and Co-operation in Europe (OSCE) has criticized the United States for its ballot access laws. In 1996, United States delegates responded to the criticism by saying that unfair ballot access "could be remedied through existing appeal and regulatory structures and did not represent a breach of the Copenhagen commitments." The OSCE published a report on the 2004 United States election, which among other things, noted restrictive ballot access laws.

== Ballot access laws by state ==
Ballot access laws in the United States vary widely from state to state:

- Alabama: Although not required to, major party candidates are nominated by the state primary process. Independent candidates are granted ballot access through a petition process and minor political party candidates are nominated by convention along with a petition process; one must collect 3% of the total votes cast in the last election for the specific race or 3% of the total votes cast in the last gubernatorial election for statewide ballot access. The figure for 2016 and 2018 statewide ballot access is 35,412 valid signatures. Be aware that the validity of signatures generally means that 20–30% more signatures will need to be collected to ensure that the goal is achieved. To retain ballot access in the following election, a party has to poll 20% in a statewide race.

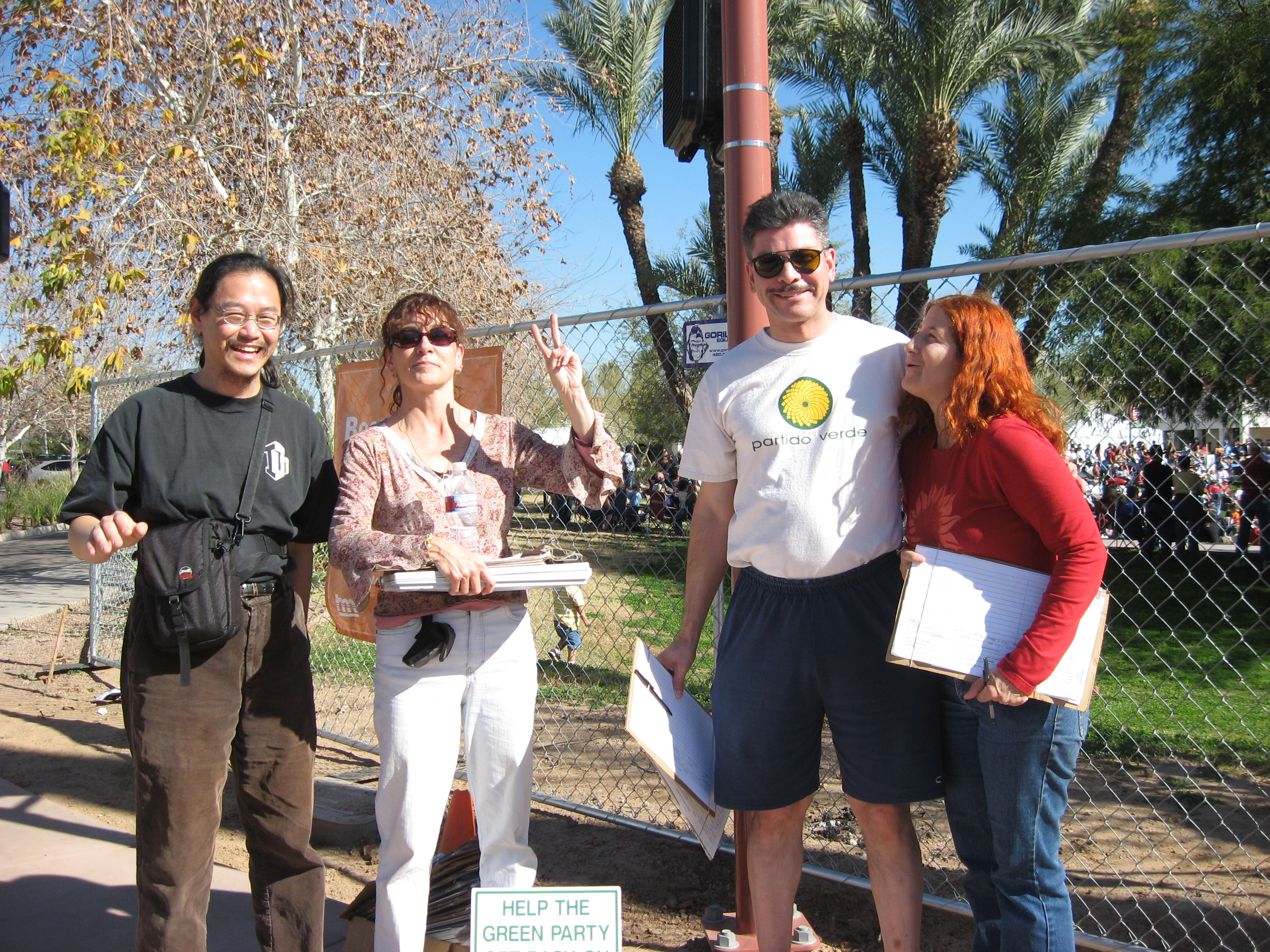
Activists of the Arizona Green Party collecting signatures for ballot status

- Arizona: To gain ballot access, a new political party must gather signatures on a county–by–county basis, achieving over 20,000 valid signatures (i.e. from registered voters). Once this has been achieved the party must run a candidate for Governor or President who garners at least 5% of the vote to maintain ballot access for an additional two years, maintain at least 1% of registered voters registered with their party, or gather approximately the same number of signatures again every two years. The Democratic, Libertarian, and Republican parties have ballot access by voter registrations. In 2008, the Arizona Green Party gathered enough signatures to gain ballot access.
- California:
  - Any office, all elections – Per section 5100 of the California Election Code, ballot access requires one of two conditions to be met:
    If at the last preceding gubernatorial election there was polled for any one of the party's candidates for any office voted on throughout the state, at least 2 percent of the entire vote of the state;
    If on or before the 135th day before any primary election, it appears to the Secretary of State, as a result of examining and totaling the statement of voters and their political affiliations transmitted to him or her by the county elections officials, that voters equal in number to at least 1 percent of the entire vote of the state at the last preceding gubernatorial election have declared their intention to affiliate with that party.
  - Governor, primary elections – Under legislation signed into law in 2019, candidates for Governor of California must publicly release personal tax returns for the previous five years in order to be listed on the primary election ballot in that state; write-in candidates are exempt from this requirement. As initially enacted, the law also applied to candidates for President of the United States; this provision was later held to be unconstitutional by the courts.
- Colorado allows candidates to be placed on the ballot either through political party assemblies, or by collecting the required number of valid signatures as specified in Colorado Revised Statutes 1-4-801 and 1-4-802 for major- and minor-party candidates respectively. The major parties are parties whose gubernatorial candidates received at least 10% of the vote in the most recent general election. The relevant county, state house, state senate, judicial district, congressional district, and state assembly place all the candidates who receive 30% or more of the assembly vote on the primary ballot; a candidate who receives less than 10% of an assembly vote is ineligible to try the signature route for the same primary ballot. Candidates may choose to bypass the assembly route altogether in favor of collecting signatures. The required number of valid signatures per congressional district for statewide candidates ranges from 500 for State Board of Education and University of Colorado Regent to 1,500 for governor and US Senate. For other offices, the signature requirement is based on the lesser of a specified number of signatures and a specified percentage of the vote for that seat in the previous election – the primary if one was held for the major party and the general election otherwise and for minor-party candidates.
- Georgia In 2016 Georgia required a third-party presidential candidate to produce 7,500 signatures of registered voters to gain ballot access. The 7,500 number was imposed by Federal District Court Judge Richard Story in a March 17, 2016, ruling against the state that their requirement of signatures equaling at least 1% of the total number of registered and eligible voters in the most recent presidential election was an unconstitutionally high barrier. The number would have been about 50,334. On April 13, 2016, the Georgia secretary of state appealed the decision without seeking a stay until the state legislature acts to change the requirement. Reason magazine reported in October 2022 that the Supreme Court of the United States declined to hear a case that would have challenged the ballot access laws of Georgia, which were reported as some of the most onerous in the nation that have kept any third party off the ballot for nearly sixty years from 2022 prior:
  Candidates for federal elected office in Georgia face different hurdles depending on which party they belong to. Republicans and Democrats get on the ballot automatically, since each party received at least 20 percent of the vote in previous elections. But for any third-party candidate running for a districted position, like in the House of Representatives, they must first collect signatures from 5 percent of all registered voters in their district—between 20,000 and 27,000. That task has proved so daunting that no third-party House candidate from Georgia has achieved it in nearly six decades.
- Illinois: The threshold barrier to ballot access in Illinois is collecting an adequate number of voters' signatures on nominating petitions. Illinois distinguishes between "Established Parties" (i.e., the Democratic Party and Republican Party, although other parties may achieve Established Party status on a county-by-county basis), "New Parties", and Independent Candidates. The signature requirements are lower for Established Parties than New Parties or Independent Candidates. The petitions must be circulated no more than 90 days prior to the filing deadline. Candidates in Illinois must also file a notarized Statement of Candidacy and, for non-federal offices, a Statement of Economic Interests. Candidates may also, but are not legally required to, submit a Code of Fair Campaign Practices pledge and a Loyalty Oath. The Loyalty Oath requirement was ruled unconstitutional in 1972.
  - Statewide Offices: Established Party candidates must submit between 5,000 and 10,000 signatures. New Parties & Independents must submit at least the lesser of 25,000 signatures or 1% of the number of voters who cast a ballot in the preceding general election. Statewide offices in Illinois include the Governor, Lt. Governor, Comptroller, Treasurer, Secretary of State, and Attorney General, and United States Senator.
  - Representative in the U.S. House of Representatives: Established Party candidates must submit at least 0.5% of the primary voters in the candidate's party in the congressional district. New Party & Independents must submit at least 5% of the number of voters who cast a ballot in the preceding general election.
  - Senator in the Illinois General Assembly: Established Party candidates must submit between 1,000 and 3,000 signatures from voters in the Illinois Senate district. New Party & Independents must submit signatures from at least 5% of the number of voters who cast a ballot in Illinois Senate district the preceding general election.
  - Representative in the Illinois General Assembly: Established Party candidates must submit between 500 and 1,500 signatures from voters in the Illinois House district. New Party & Independents must submit signatures from at least 5% of the number of voters who cast a ballot in Illinois House district the preceding general election.
- Kentucky uses a three-tier system for ballot access, using the results of the previous presidential election as the gauge. If a party's presidential candidate achieves less than 2% of the popular vote within the state, that organization is a "political group". If the candidate receives 2% or more, but less than 20% of the popular vote in Kentucky, that organization is a "political organization". Parties whose candidate for president achieves at least 20% of the popular vote are considered "political parties". Taxpayer-funded primaries are achieved as a "political party". Automatic ballot access is obtained as a "political organization" or "political party", and these levels require only 2 signatures for a candidate to run for any partisan office. There is no mechanism for placing an entire party on the ballot in Kentucky, other than achieving "political organization" or "political party" status. Candidates of "political groups" and independent candidates must collect a minimum of between 25 and 5000 signatures to run for any particular partisan office. Filing fees apply equitably to all levels. Traditionally, the state only tracked voter registration affiliation as Democratic (D), Republican (R), or Other (O). Beginning 1 January 2006, Kentucky law provides for County Clerks to track the voter registration of Constitution (C), Green (G), Libertarian (L), Reform (F), and Socialist Workers (S), as well as independent (I); though a number of County Clerks have not been complying with this regulation.
- Louisiana is one of the easiest states to get on the ballot. Anyone may obtain a spot on the ballot by either paying a qualifying fee, or submitting petition signatures. For independent candidates for President (or non-recognized parties) the fee is $500 or 5000 signatures, with at least 500 from each Congressional district. Recognized Parties simply file their slate of Electors – their access is automatic, no fee or signatures required. For statewide office, the signature requirement is the same as that for president, but the fees are $750 for Governor and $600 for all other statewide offices. District and local office fees range from $40 or 50 signatures for a small town office, to $600 or 1000 signatures for US House. All signatures for district offices must come from within that district. If the office is for a political party committee, the signatures must be from people affiliated with that party. For Presidential Preference Primaries, the fee is $750 or 1000 signatures affiliated with that party from each Congressional district. Present Louisiana law only allows for Presidential Primaries if a party has more than 40,000 registered voters statewide. Currently, this only applies to the Democratic and Republican Parties. Louisiana law changed in 2004 under efforts from the Libertarian Party of Louisiana to relax rules in place at that time for recognizing political parties in the state. There are now two methods to gain official recognition. Method A allows a party to be recognized if it pays a $1000 fee AND has 1000 or more voters registered under its label. To retain recognition, it must field a candidate at least once in any four-year period in a statewide election – with no requirement on performance in the election. Statewide election slots include Presidential Elector, Governor, Senator, Lt. Governor, Secretary of State, Attorney General, Treasurer, Comm. of Insurance, and Commissioner of Agriculture. To date, the Libertarian Party and the Green Party have used this method to attain and retain official party recognition. Method B allows a party to be recognized if one of its candidates in a statewide race or for Presidential Elector achieves 5% of the vote. To retain recognition, it must repeat the 5% tally for statewide office or Presidential Elector at least once in any four-year period. To date, the Reform Party has used this method to gain and retain official party recognition. Due to their size, parties recognized by these methods are exempt from certain laws governing public elections of political committee offices and from certain financial reporting requirements until their membership reaches 5% of registered voters statewide. Recognized political parties in Louisiana are allowed to have their party name appear alongside their candidates on the ballot, and for their party to be offered as a specific choice on voter registration cards. Non-recognized parties appear as OTHER, and the party name must be written in on the registration card. Non-affiliated voters are listed as N for No Party. In the 2008 and 2010 Congressional elections, Louisiana experimented with closed primaries for House and Senate. Under this system, recognized parties participated in semi-closed primaries before the general election. Only one candidate from each party was allowed on the General Election ballot; there was no limit for OTHER or NONE. An attempt to pass a law differentiating "minor" parties similar to the rule for Presidential Primaries was defeated but made irrelevant by Louisiana reverting to its "Jungle Primary" system where all candidates, regardless of number from any party, all compete together on the same ballot. If no one achieves a majority, a general election is held as a run-off between the top two, also regardless of party affiliation.
- Maryland: Party certifications are done for each gubernatorial cycle (e.g. 2006–2010). If the number of registered voters to a political party is less than 1%, then 10,000 petition signatures must be gathered for that party to be considered certified. A party must be certified before voters can register under that party. A party can also be certified for a two-year term if their "top of the ticket" candidate receives more than 1% of the vote.
- Michigan: Major party candidates for Congress, governor, state legislature, countywide offices, and township offices are chosen through a primary system. A candidate can appear on the ballot by filing petition signatures; candidates for certain offices may file a $100 filing fee in lieu of filing petition signatures. All minor-party candidates, as well as major-party candidates for certain statewide offices, are chosen by a convention. Candidates running for nonpartisan offices (including judgeships, school boards, and most city offices) can appear on the ballot via petitions, as can candidates running for partisan offices without party affiliation.
- Minnesota: Major party candidates are nominated by the state primary process. Independent and minor political party candidates are nominated by a petition process; 2,000 signatures for a statewide election, or 500 for a state legislative election. Candidates have a two-week period to collect nominating petition signatures. Independent candidates may select a brief political party designation in lieu of independent.
- Missouri exempts parties from needing to gather signatures if they attain 2% of the vote in a statewide election.
- New York

To be recognized, a political party must gain 50,000 votes in the most recent gubernatorial election. (There are, as of 2019, eight such parties. Three of these have primarily resorted to electoral fusion and usually only nominate candidates already on either the Democratic or Republican lines.) This allows for primary elections and allows statewide candidates to be exempted from having to petition. Any other candidate must file petitions. For statewide candidates, 15,000 signatures are required, and there must be at least 100 signatures from each of at least 1/2 of the congressional districts in the state (27 as of 2014). All state legislature and congressional candidates must file petitions regardless of party nominations, except in special elections. Village and town elections have less restrictive ballot access rules.

- North Carolina's law pertaining to ballot access is codified in N.C.G.S Chapter 163 Elections and Election Law:
  - New Political Parties: According to N.C.G.S. §163-96(a)(2) for a new political party to gain access to the election ballot they must obtain signatures on a petition equal to at least 2% of the total number of votes cast for Governor in the most recent election by no later than 12:00 noon on the first day of June before the election in which the party wishes to participate. In addition, at least 200 signatures must come from at least four separate US Congressional Districts each within the state. To qualify for the 2010 or 2012 election ballot a new political party must gather at least 85,379 signatures within approximately a 3.5 year time span, averaging at least 67 signatures every day for three and half years straight counting weekdays and holidays.
  - Political Party Retention Requirement: According to N.C.G.S. §163-96(a)(1) in order for a political party to remain certified for the election ballot after obtaining access to the ballot, or to remain recognized by the State of North Carolina, that party must successfully garner at least 2% of the total vote cast for Governor for its candidate. If a party's candidate for Governor fails to receive at least 2% of the vote, that party loses ballot access (N.C.G.S. §163-97) and must begin the petitioning process over again, and the voter affiliation of all registered voters affiliated with that party is changed to unaffiliated (N.C.G.S. §163-97.1).
  - Statewide Unaffiliated Requirements: According to N.C.G.S. §163-122(a)(1) in order for an unaffiliated candidate to qualify for the election ballot for a statewide office, the candidate must obtain signatures on a petition equal to at least 2% of the total number of votes caste for Governor in the most recent election by 12:00 noon on the last Friday in June before the election in which the candidate wishes to participate. In addition, at least 200 signatures must come from at least four separate US Congressional Districts each within the state. To qualify for the 2010 or 2012 election ballot unaffiliated statewide candidates must obtain at least 85,379 signatures.
  - District Unaffiliated Requirements: According to N.C.G.S. §163-122(a)(2–3) in order for an unaffiliated candidate to qualify for the election ballot for a district office, the candidate must obtain signatures on a petition equal to at least 4% of the total number of registered voters within the district that the candidate is running for election in as of January 1 of the election year in which the candidate desires to appear on the election ballot. Signatures must be turned in by 12:00 noon on the last Friday in June before the election in which the candidate wishes to participate. District candidates effectively cannot start petitioning for ballot access until after January 1 of the election year they are running for election, giving them just under half a year to obtain signatures for ballot access. To qualify for the 2010 election ballot unaffiliated US Congressional candidates are required to obtain as many as 22,544 signatures and an average of 18,719 signatures required for access to the 2010 election ballot.
- North Dakota requires 7,000 petition signatures to create a new political party and nominate a slate of candidates for office. Independent candidates need 1,000 for a statewide office or 300 for a state legislative office. The independent nominating petition process does not allow for candidates to appear on the ballot with a political party designation, in lieu of independent, except for presidential elections.
- Ohio: Late in 2006, the 6th U.S. Circuit Court of Appeals invalidated Ohio's law for ballot access for new political parties in a suit brought by the Libertarian Party of Ohio. After the November elections, the outgoing Secretary of State and Attorney General requested an extension to file an appeal to the US Supreme Court so that the decision to appeal could be made by the newly elected Secretary of State and Attorney General. The new Secretary of State did not appeal, but instead asserted her authority as Chief Election Officer of Ohio to issue new ballot access rules. In July 2008, a US District Court invalidated the Secretary of State's rules and placed the Libertarian Party on the ballot. Three other parties subsequently sued and were placed on the ballot by the Court or by the Secretary of State.
- Oklahoma: A party is defined either as a group that polled 10% for the office at the top of the ticket in the last election (i.e., president or governor), or that submits a petition signed by voters equal to 5% of the last vote cast for the office at the top of the ticket. An independent presidential candidate, or the presidential candidate of an unqualified party, may get on the ballot with a petition of 3% of the last presidential vote. Oklahoma is the only state in the nation in which an independent presidential candidate, or the presidential candidate of a new or previously unqualified party, needs support from more than 2% of the last vote cast to get on the ballot. An initiative was circulated in 2007 to lower the ballot access rules for political parties.
- Pennsylvania: A new party or independent candidate may gain ballot access for one election as a "political body" by collecting petition signatures equal to 2% of the vote for the highest vote-getter in the most recent election in the jurisdiction. A political body that wins 2% of the vote obtained by the highest vote-getter statewide in the same election is recognized statewide as a "political party" for two years. A political party with a voter enrollment equal to less than 15% of the state's total partisan enrollment is classified as a "minor political party," which has automatic ballot access in special elections but must otherwise collect the same number of signatures as political bodies. Political parties not relegated to "minor" status qualify to participate in primary elections. Candidates may gain access to primary election ballots by collecting a set number of petition signatures for each office, generally significantly fewer than required for political bodies and minor political parties.
- South Dakota: For a registered political party in a statewide election they must collect petition signatures equal to 1% of the vote for that political party in the preceding election for state governor. An independent candidate must collect petition signatures equal to 1% of the total votes for state governor, and a new political party must collect 250 petition signatures. In state legislative elections, a registered political party needs to collect 50 signatures and an independent candidate must collect 1% of the total votes cast for state governor in the preceding election in their respective district.
- Tennessee: A candidate seeking a House or Senate seat at the state or national level must gather 25 signatures from registered voters to be put on the ballot for any elected office. Presidential candidates seeking to represent an officially recognized party must either be named as candidates by the Tennessee Secretary of State or gather 2,500 signatures from registered voters, and an independent candidate for president must gather 275 signatures and put forward a full slate of eleven candidates who have agreed to serve as electors. To be recognized as a party and have its candidates listed on the ballot under that party's name, a political party must gather signatures equal to or in excess of 2.5% of the total number of votes cast in the last gubernatorial election (about 45,000 signatures based on the election held in 2006). A third party to be officially recognized was the American Party in 1968; none of its candidates received 5% of the statewide vote in 1970 or 1972 and it was then subject to decertification as an official party after the 1972 election. In 2012, a state court ruled that the Green Party of Tennessee and the Constitution Party of Tennessee would join the Republican and Democratic Parties on the ballot beginning with the November 6, 2012 election.
- Texas: For a registered political party in a statewide election to gain ballot access, they must either: obtain 5% of the vote in any statewide election; or collect petition signatures equal to 1% of the total votes cast in the preceding election for governor, and must do so by January 2 of the year in which such statewide election is held. An independent candidate for any statewide office must collect petition signatures equal to 1% of the total votes cast for governor, and must do so beginning the day after primary elections are held and complete collection within 60 days thereafter (if runoff elections are held, the window is shortened to beginning the day after runoff elections are held and completed within 30 days thereafter). The petition signature cannot be from anyone who voted in either primary (including runoff), and voters cannot sign multiple petitions (they must sign a petition for one party or candidate only).
- Virginia: A candidate for any statewide or local office must be qualified to vote for as well as hold the office they are running for, must have been "a resident of the county, city or town which he offers at the time of filing", a resident of the district, if it is an election for a specific district, and a resident of Virginia for one year before the election. For any office the candidate must obtain signatures of at least 125 registered voters for the area where they are running for office (except in communities of fewer than 3,500 people, where the number is lower), and if they are running as a candidate from a political party where partisan elections are permitted, must pay a fee of 2% of their yearly salary (no fee is required for persons not running as a candidate for a primary of a political party). Petitions, along with additional paperwork, must be filed between about four and five months before the election, subject to additional requirements for candidates for a primary election. 1,000 signatures are required for a US House race and 10,000 for a statewide race (i.e. US president, US Senate, Governor, Lieutenant Governor, or Attorney General), including 400 from each Congressional district. Nominees of a political party that "at either of the two preceding statewide general elections, received at least 10 percent of the total vote cast for any statewide office filled in that election" are exempt from needing to gather signatures.

=== Constitutional dimensions of ballot access laws ===
The Constitution has limited the states' discretion to determine their own ballot access laws:

- the right to equal protection of the laws under the Fourteenth Amendment (when the restrictions involve a discriminatory classification of voters, candidates, or political parties);
- rights of political association under the First Amendment (especially when the restrictions burden the rights of political parties and other political associations, but also when they infringe on the rights of a candidate or a voter not to associate with a political party);
- rights of free expression under the First Amendment;
- rights of voters (which the Supreme Court has said are "inextricably intertwined" with the rights of candidates);
- property interests and liberty interests in candidacy;
- other rights to "due process of law"
- the right to petition the government (this argument is sometimes raised to allege that signature-gathering requirements, or the rules implementing them, are unfairly restrictive);
- freedom of the press (which historically included the right to print ballots containing the name of the candidate of one's choosing);
- the right to a "republican form of government," which is guaranteed to each state (although this clause has been held not to be enforceable in court by individual citizens).

The US Supreme Court precedent on ballot access laws cases has been conflicting. In Williams v. Rhodes (1969) the court struck down Ohio's ballot access laws on First and Fourteenth Amendment grounds. During the 1970s the Supreme Court upheld strict ballot access laws, with a 'compelling State interest' being the "preservation of the integrity of the electoral process and regulating the number of candidates on the ballot to avoid voter confusion."

The Supreme Court did strike down provisions in a ballot access law in Anderson v. Celebrezze, 460 U.S. 780 (1983), but most of the subsequent court rulings in the 1980s–2000s continued to uphold ballot access laws in both primary and general elections. Among the most notable of these cases from the 1970s–1990s:

- Bullock v. Carter, 405 U.S. 134 (1972)
- Illinois State Bd. of Elections v. Socialist Workers Party, 440 U.S. 173 (1979)
- U.S. Term Limits, Inc. v. Thornton, 514 U.S. 779 (1995)
- Lubin v. Panish, 415 U.S. 709 (1974)
- Norman v. Reed, 502 U.S. 279 (1992).

The Supreme Court has not expressly ruled on the maximum level of restrictions that can be imposed on an otherwise qualified candidate or political party seeking ballot access. As a result, lower courts have often reached difficult conclusions about whether a particular ballot access rule is unconstitutional.

Requiring an otherwise eligible candidate or political party to obtain signatures greater than 5% of the eligible voters in the previous election may be unconstitutional. This is based on Jenness v. Fortson, 403 U.S. 431 (1971); the court upheld a restrictive ballot access law with this 5% signature requirement, whereas the Williams v. Rhodes (1969) had involved a 15% signature requirement. Most State ballot access requirements, even the more restrictive ones, are less than 5%, and the Supreme Court has generally refused to hear ballot access cases that involved an Independent or minor party candidate challenging a ballot access law that requires less than 5%.

=== International human rights law and ballot access ===
International agreements that have the status of treaties of the US are part of the supreme law of the land, under Article VI of the United States Constitution:

- International Covenant on Civil and Political Rights, Art. 25
- Copenhagen Document, ¶¶6–8, Annex I to 1990 Charter of Paris

Another source of international human rights law derives from universally accepted norms that have found expression in resolutions of the U.N. General Assembly. Although the Universal Declaration of Human Rights is not binding under US law the way a treaty is, this type of norm is recognized as a source of international law in such treaties as the Statute of the International Court of Justice, to which the US is a party:

- Universal Declaration of Human Rights, Art. 21

(NB: to be completed)

== Write-in status versus ballot access ==
Depending on the office and the state, it may be possible for a voter to cast a write-in vote for a candidate whose name does not appear on the ballot. It is extremely rare for such a candidate to win office. In some cases, write-in votes are simply not counted. Having one's name printed on the ballot confers an enormous advantage over candidates who are not on the ballot. The US Supreme Court has noted that write-in status is not a substitute for being on the ballot.

The two most notable cases of write-in candidates actually winning are the elections of Lisa Murkowski in 2010 and Strom Thurmond in 1954, both to the United States Senate. Other cases include the election of Charlotte Burks to the Tennessee State Senate seat of her late husband, Tommy Burks, murdered by his only opponent on the ballot; and the write-in primary victories in the re-election campaign of Mayor Anthony A. Williams of the District of Columbia. All of these cases involved unique political circumstances, a popular and well–known candidate, and a highly organized and well–funded write-in education campaign.

== Other obstacles facing third parties ==
The growth of any third political party in the United States faces extremely challenging obstacles, among them restrictive ballot access. Other obstacles often cited as barriers to third-party growth include:

- Requirement hurdle of a number of signatures (often in the many thousands) required prior to placing a third-party candidate on the ballot (a requirement often waived entirely for other parties, in the US, such as the Democratic and Republican parties);
- Campaign funding reimbursement for any political party that gets at least 5% of the vote—implemented in many states "to help smaller parties"—typically helps the two biggest parties;
- Laws intended to fight corporate donations, with loopholes that require teams of lawyers to navigate the laws;
- The role of corporate money in propping up the two established parties;
- The allegedly related general reluctance of news organizations to cover minor political party campaigns;
- Moderate voters being divided between the major parties, or registered independent, so that both major primaries are hostile to moderate or independent candidates;
- Politically motivated gerrymandering of election districts by those in power, to reduce or eliminate political competition (two-party proponents would argue that the minority party in that district should just nominate a more centrist candidate relative to that district);
- Plurality voting scaring voters from credibly considering more than two major parties, as opponents of one would have to unite behind the other to have the most effective chance of winning (see Duverger's law);
- The extended history and reputations of the two established parties, with both existing for over 150 years and being entrenched in the minds of the public;
- The absence of proportional representation;
- The 15% poll requirement by the non-government entity Commission on Presidential Debates;
- The public view that third parties have no chance of beating the worse of evils, and are therefore a wasted vote;
- Campaign costs of convincing interested voters that the party nominee has a chance of winning, and regaining that trust after an election where the third party got the third-most votes or split the vote between two similar candidates so that the most disliked candidate won (i.e. "spoiling" the election; this is less of a problem with Condorcet voting and range voting).

== Justification of strict ballot access laws by two party supporters ==
Strict ballot access laws are not required for a two–party system, as can be seen by the experience of the United Kingdom. However, the following arguments are put forth about the need for strict ballot access laws in the United States:

- With plurality voting, allowing third candidates on the ballot could split the vote of a majority and throw the race to a candidate not favored by the majority. Allowing only two candidates on the ballot ensures that at least the worst one is never elected.
- If a third party could get enough votes to win an election, then voters who would support the nominee could infiltrate one of the two parties by registering as members, and force a win in that party's primary. However, pulling this off would take considerable coordination on the part of the supporting voters, especially if half of them preferred to infiltrate the other major party or remain independent. It would also depend on the rules of the major party for how people may become candidates in their primary, and on which registered members may vote in the primary.
- There is a one person one vote mandate. If voters could vote in a primary for one candidate, and then sign a petition for another candidate, this would violate that mandate. Some voters might sign a petition for the candidate they want, and then vote in the primary for the candidate who would be easier to beat. Since primary votes are anonymous, and a party therefore cannot remove that voter's vote after it is cast, the only remedy is to strike the voter's signature on the petition. As for signatures not counting if a voter later votes in a primary, that could be reformed since the political party would know in advance about the signatures if they are filed in time.
- Sore loser laws, where a candidate who loses in a primary may not then run as an independent candidate in that same election, stem from contract laws. Similar–minded candidates run in the same primary with the contract that the losers will drop out of the race and support the winner so that they do not split the votes of similar–minded voters and cause the other party's nominee to win with 40% of the vote. The need for primaries is primarily because of plurality voting, whose rules state that the candidate receiving the most votes wins, even if not a majority.
- Strict ballot access laws make it difficult for extremists to get on the ballot, since few people would want to sign their petition.

== See also ==
- Ballot Access News
- Coalition for Free and Open Elections
- Free the Vote North Carolina
- Green Party of the United States
- Libertarian Party (United States)
- Non-human electoral candidate
- Third party (U.S. politics)
- United States presidential eligibility legislation

== Bibliography ==
- Dimitri Evseev. "A Second Look At Third Parties: Correcting The Supreme Court's Understanding of Elections". Boston University Law Review. Vol. 85:1277 (2005)
- Essays by Richard Winger, editor and publisher of Ballot Access News
