= Sophie Melvin Gerson =

American labor union activist (1910–2006)

Sophie Melvin
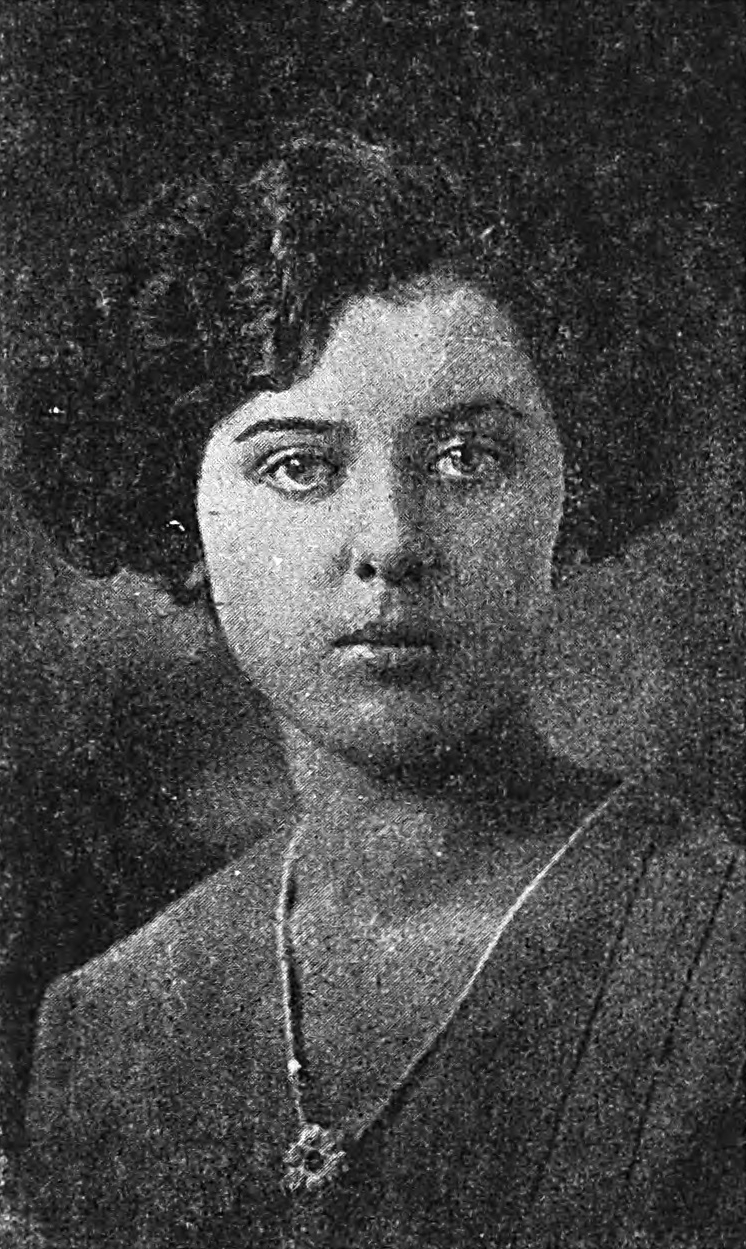
- Melvin c. 1929
- Born: February 22, 1910; Dzygivka, Podolia Governorate, Russian Empire
- Died: March 20, 2006 (aged 96); New York City, U.S.
- Citizenship: American
- Known for: Loray Mill strike defendant
- Political party: Communist
- Criminal charge: Murder of policeman during strike
- Spouse: Si Gerson (m. 1932)
- Children: William; Deborah

Sophie Melvin Gerson (1910 – March 20, 2006) was a Jewish labor organizer and socialist involved in early 20th-century textile union activism.

== Biography ==
Melvin was born in the shtetl of Dzygivka, in what is now Ukraine, the second youngest of seven children. Her family fled antisemitic pogroms and poverty, arriving in the US in 1922. They settled in the Brownsville neighborhood of Brooklyn.

As a labor organizer, Melvin was known for her involvement in the 1929 Loray Mill strike in Gastonia, North Carolina, during which she was arrested at age 19. She has been described as a lifelong fighter for peace, justice, and socialism.

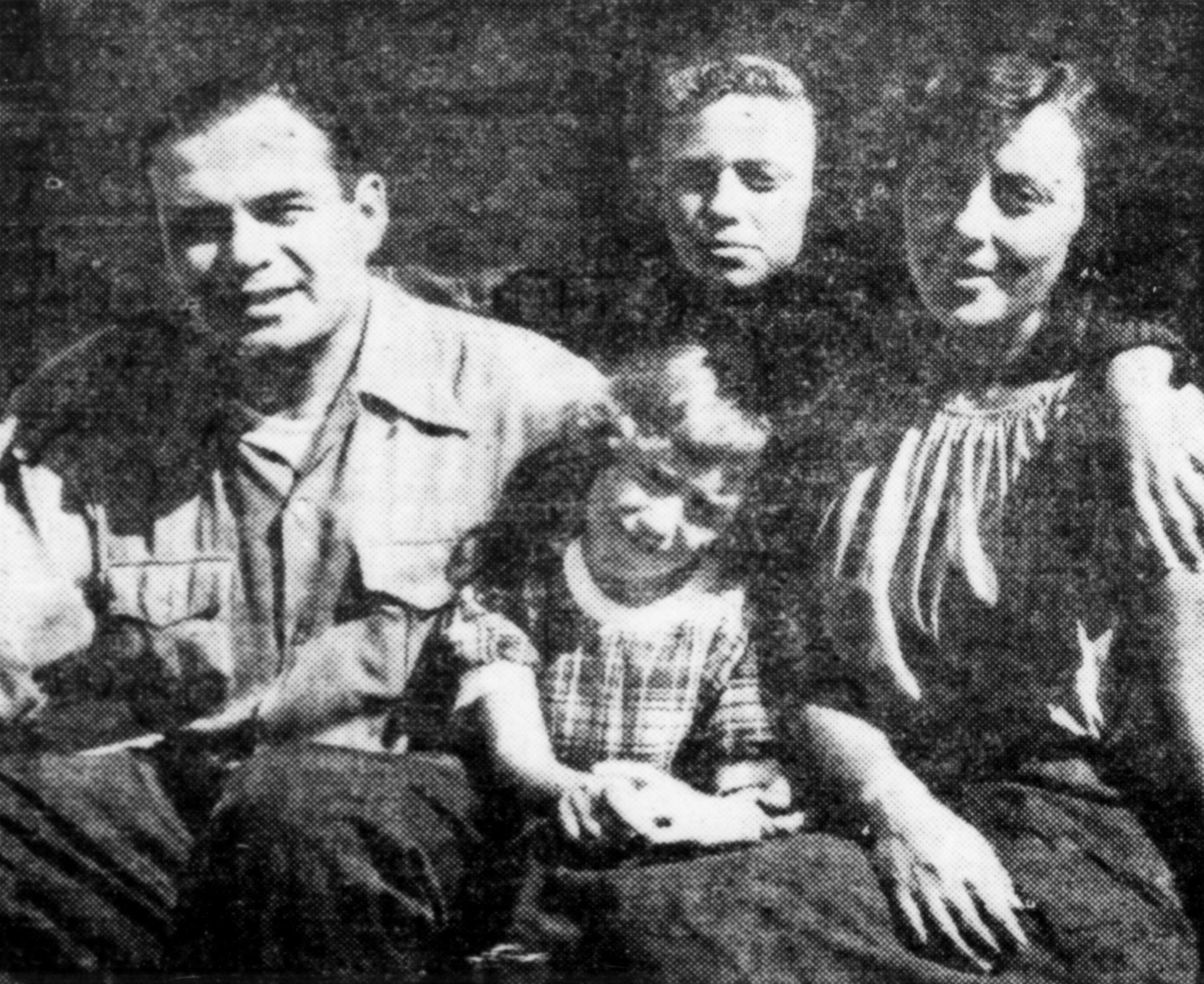
Melvin with her husband Si and their children c. 1953

Melvin married journalist and Communist Party leader Simon W. Gerson in 1932. The couple had two children.

In 1953, after Si Gerson was acquitted of Smith Act charges, Leonard P. Moore filed charges against Sophie Melvin on behalf of the federal government. The aim was to de-naturalize Melvin so that she and her family would be forced to leave the US. The charges alleged she had failed to disclose Communist Party membership and five arrests, including two for inciting a riot and three for disorderly conduct. She was indicted under the Smith Act and Walter-McCarran Act. She was acquitted of Smith Act charges.

== Legacy ==
Melvin and Gerson's papers were donated to the Tamiment Library after their deaths.
