= Isidore Begun =

Communist Party politician

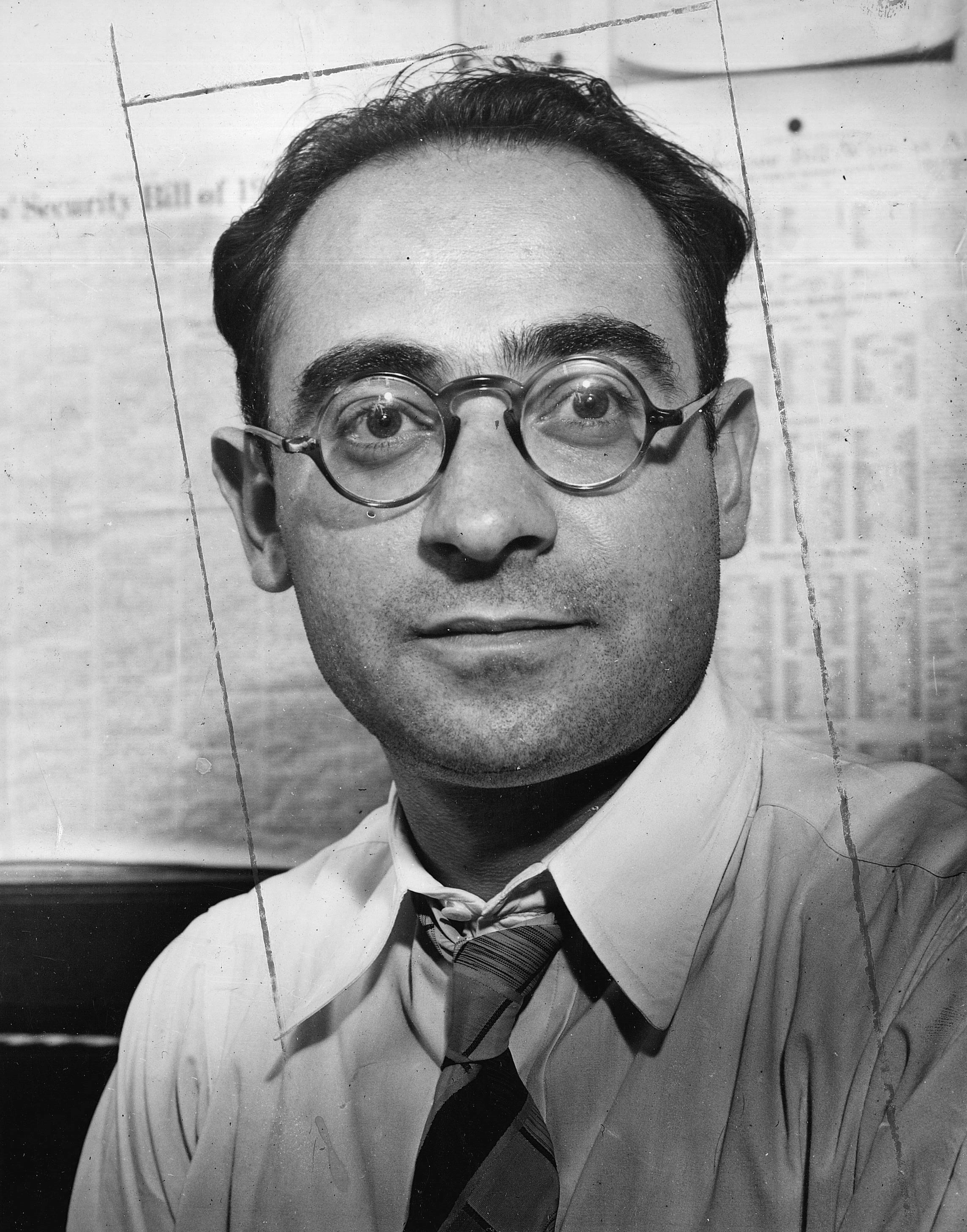
Begun c. 1937

Isidore Begun (December 3, 1903 – October 21, 1988) was a Belarusian-American teacher, labor leader and politician who served as chairman of the Unemployed Teachers Association in the 1930s and the Bronx County Communist Party in the 1940s. He was the Communist Party's candidate for New York City Council in the Bronx in four elections. He was later prosecuted under the Smith Act.

== Biography ==
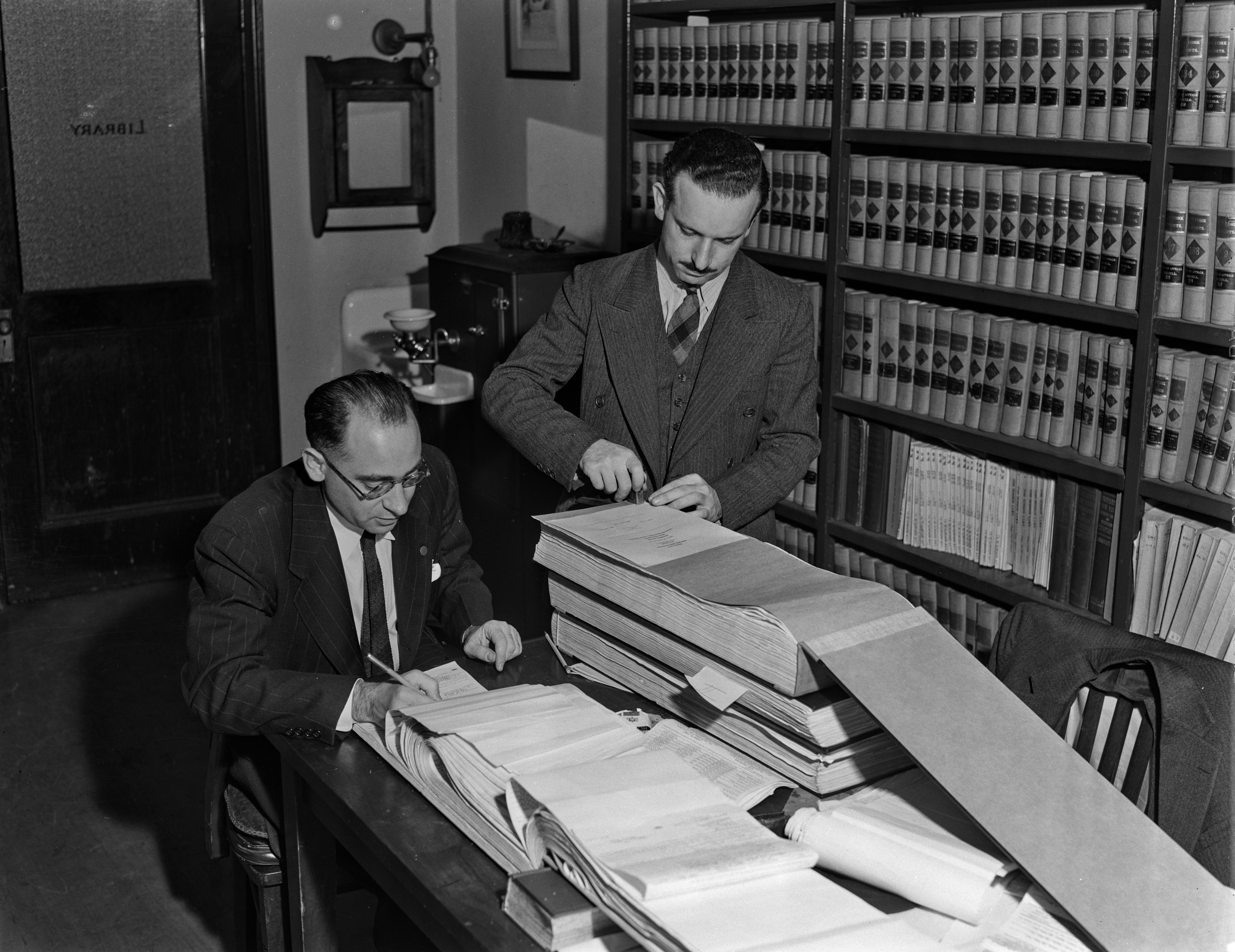
Begun (left) at a campaign meeting in a library c. 1943

Begun was born in Pinsk (then a part of the Minsk Governorate in the Russian Empire) on December 3, 1903, immigrating to the United States in April of the following year. According to the Daily Worker, his father was Jewish and worked as a capmaker in the Lower East Side. Begun himself began working at the age of 12, using the money to pay for his education and eventually graduate from Columbia University with a Master of Arts.

Begun became a naturalized citizen in September 1925. That year he started work as a public school teacher in the Bronx. He joined the Communist Party USA in 1928. Begun worked with the New York City Teachers Union, where his left-wing politics were controversial. John Dewey attempted to have him fired for disruptive behavior in 1933. Begun was dismissed from his teaching position in 1934, after he defended a teacher who had been fired for protesting salary cuts. Following his firing, Begun became the chairman of the Unemployed Teachers Association.

In 1937, Begun was the Communist Party's candidate for New York City Council but lost the election to Salvatore Ninfo. He ran again in 1939, 1941 and 1943 despite an attempt to remove him from the ballot due to his Communist Party membership. He also served as chairman of the Bronx County Communist Party from 1944 to 1949, when he was removed from office for "failing to struggle against white chauvinism." He was reinstated in 1950 following a period of criticism and self-criticism, but by 1951 was once again no longer in office. During World War II, he had a column in the Daily Worker called "Civilian Front," which detailed civil defense efforts in the United States.

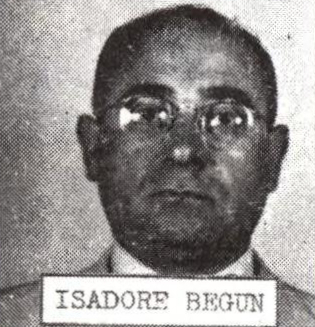
Begun's FBI mugshot, 1951

On the morning of June 20, 1951, Begun and 16 other Communist Party leaders were arrested by the FBI and charged with violating the Smith Act. In September 1952, Judge Edward J. Dimock dropped the charges against Begun and Si Gerson, arguing that there was insufficient evidence to convict them.
