= 1986 California Secretary of State election =

- November 4, 1986
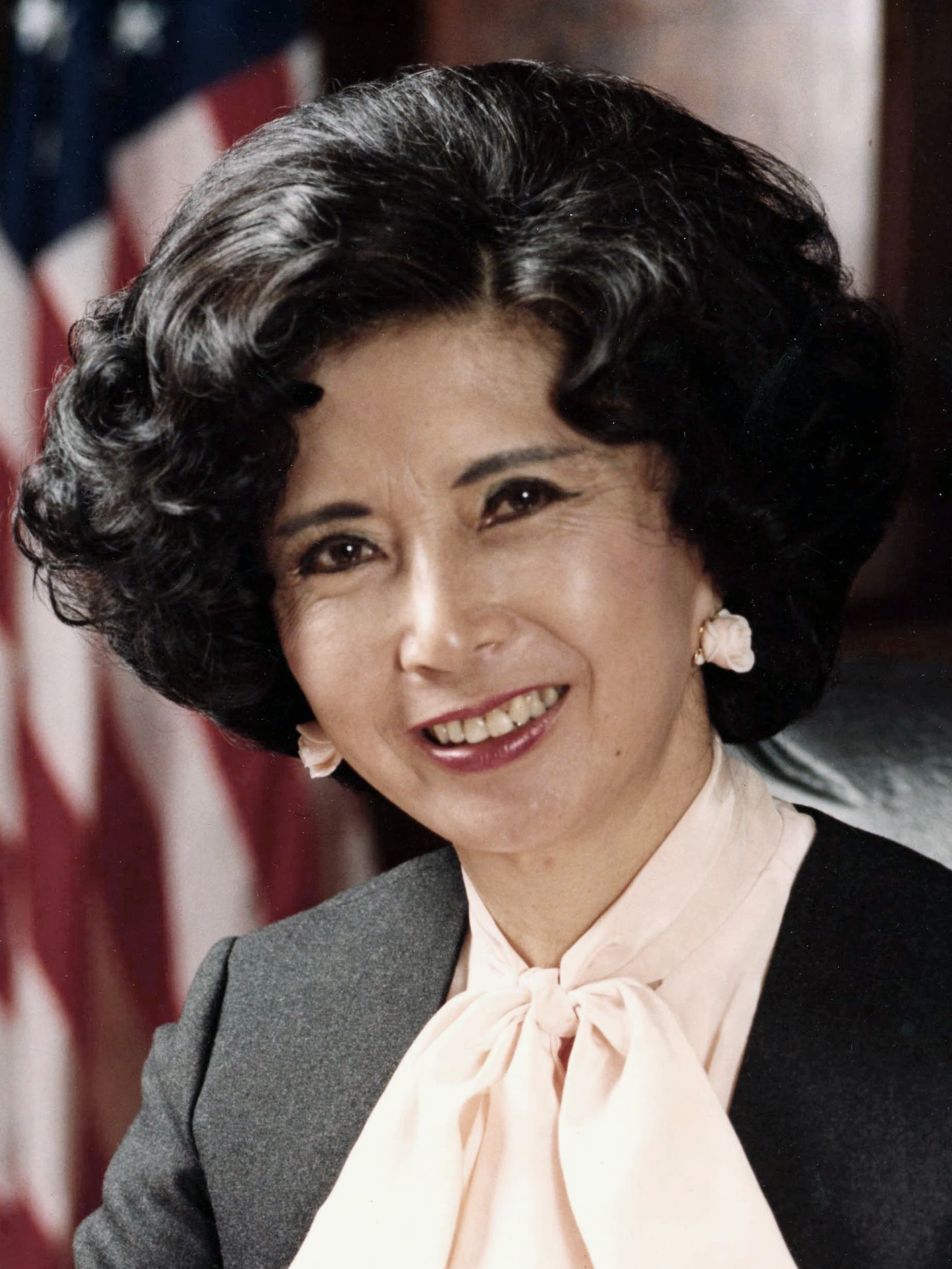

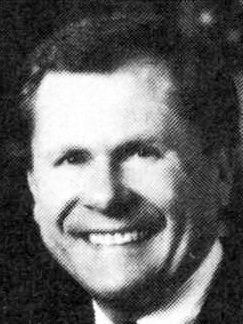
| Nominee | March Fong Eu | Bruce Nestande |
| Party | Democratic | Republican |
| Popular vote | 4,971,230 | 1,908,864 |
| Percentage | 68.84% | 26.43% |
- County results Fong Eu: 40–50% 50–60% 60–70% 70–80% 80–90%
Secretary of State before election
March Fong Eu
Democratic
Elected Secretary of State
March Fong Eu
Democratic

The 1986 California Secretary of State election was held on November 4, 1986. Democratic incumbent March Fong Eu defeated Republican nominee Bruce Nestande with 68.84% of the vote.

== Primary elections ==
Primary elections were held on June 3, 1986.

=== Republican primary ===
==== Candidates ====
- Bruce Nestande, former State Assemblyman
- Ralph E. Winkler
- Mike Cyrus

==== Results ====
Republican primary results
| Party | Candidate | Votes | % |
|---|---|---|---|
| Republican | Bruce Nestande | 831,546 | 50.06 |
| Republican | Ralph E. Winkler | 496,537 | 29.89 |
| Republican | Mike Cyrus | 332,968 | 20.05 |
| Total votes | | 1,661,051 | 100.00 |

== General election ==
=== Candidates ===
Major party candidates

- March Fong Eu, Democratic
- Bruce Nestande, Republican

Other candidates

- Gloria Garcia, Peace and Freedom
- Richard Winger, Libertarian
- Theresa F. Dietrich, American Independent

=== Results ===
1986 California Secretary of State election
| Party | Candidate | Votes | % | ±% |
|---|---|---|---|---|
| Democratic | March Fong Eu | 4,971,230 | 68.84% | |
| Republican | Bruce Nestande | 1,908,864 | 26.43% | |
| Peace and Freedom | Gloria Garcia | 153,478 | 2.13% | |
| Libertarian | Richard Winger | 105,860 | 1.47% | |
| American Independent | Theresa F. Dietrich | 81,712 | 1.13% | |
| Majority | | 3,062,366 | | |
| Turnout | | | | |
| Democratic hold | | Swing | | |
