= Si Gerson =

American journalist

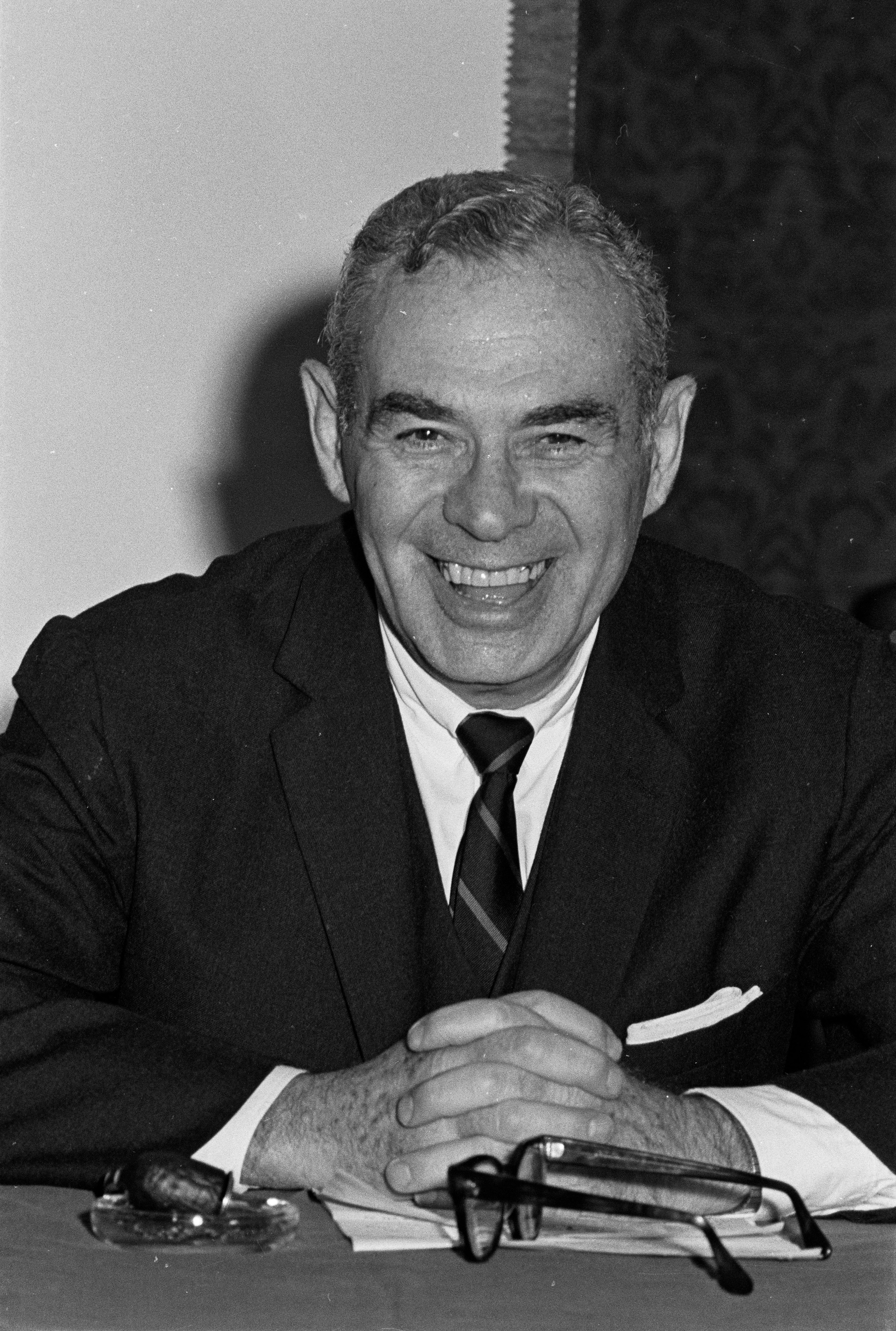
- Gerson in 1969

Confidential Examiner to the Borough President of Manhattan
- In office January 1, 1938 – September 27, 1940
- Borough President: Stanley M. Isaacs

Personal details
- Born: January 23, 1909 New York City, U.S.
- Died: December 26, 2004 (aged 95) New York City, U.S.
- Party: Communist
- Spouse: Sophie Melvin (m. 1932)
- Children: William; Deborah
- Education: City College of New York
- Occupation: Journalist, activist, politician
- Known for: First Communist to hold any appointed office in New York City
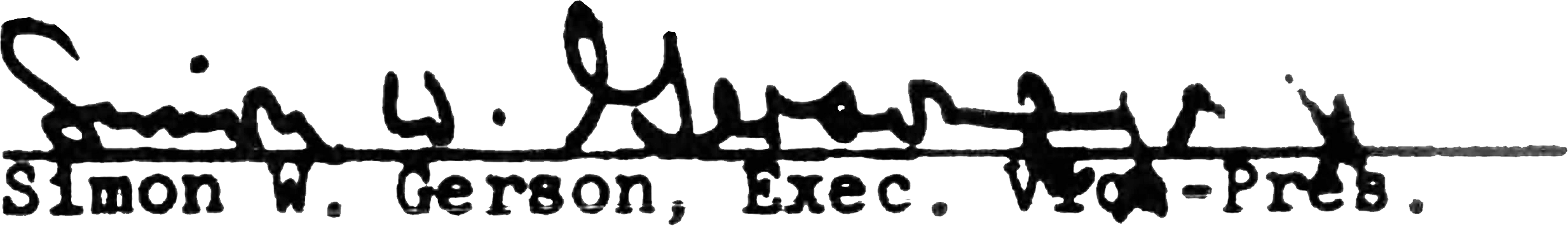
- Signature

Military service
- Allegiance: United States
- Branch/service: United States Army
- Years of service: 1944–1946
- Rank: Private
- Battles/wars: World War II; Pacific Theater; New Guinea Campaign; Philippines Campaign

Simon William Gerson (January 23, 1909 – December 26, 2004) was an American communist politician, journalist and activist. A leading member of the Communist Party USA, he was considered its expert on campaigns and elections. He was at the center of several controversies during his career, including his expulsion from the City College of New York in 1928, his appointment as confidential examiner to the Borough President of Manhattan in 1938, and his attempted appointment to the New York City Council in 1948. He also served as executive editor of the Daily Worker and its successor, the Daily World.

== Early life ==
Simon William Gerson was born in New York City on January 23, 1909, the eldest child of Jewish immigrants from the Grodno region, located in modern-day Belarus.

Both of Gerson's parents were members of the Socialist Party of America, and his mother, Dr. Helen Movshovitz, later became a member of the Communist Party USA and supported William Z. Foster's presidential campaigns. Gerson's father supported Norman Thomas' campaigns.

== Career ==
Gerson joined the Young Communist League USA while attending the City College of New York and was expelled from the college in 1928 for leading anti-ROTC activities. He joined the Communist Party itself in 1931, working as a sports columnist, city hall correspondent, state legislative correspondent and city editor of the Daily Worker. He later served as executive editor of the paper and its successor, the Daily World.

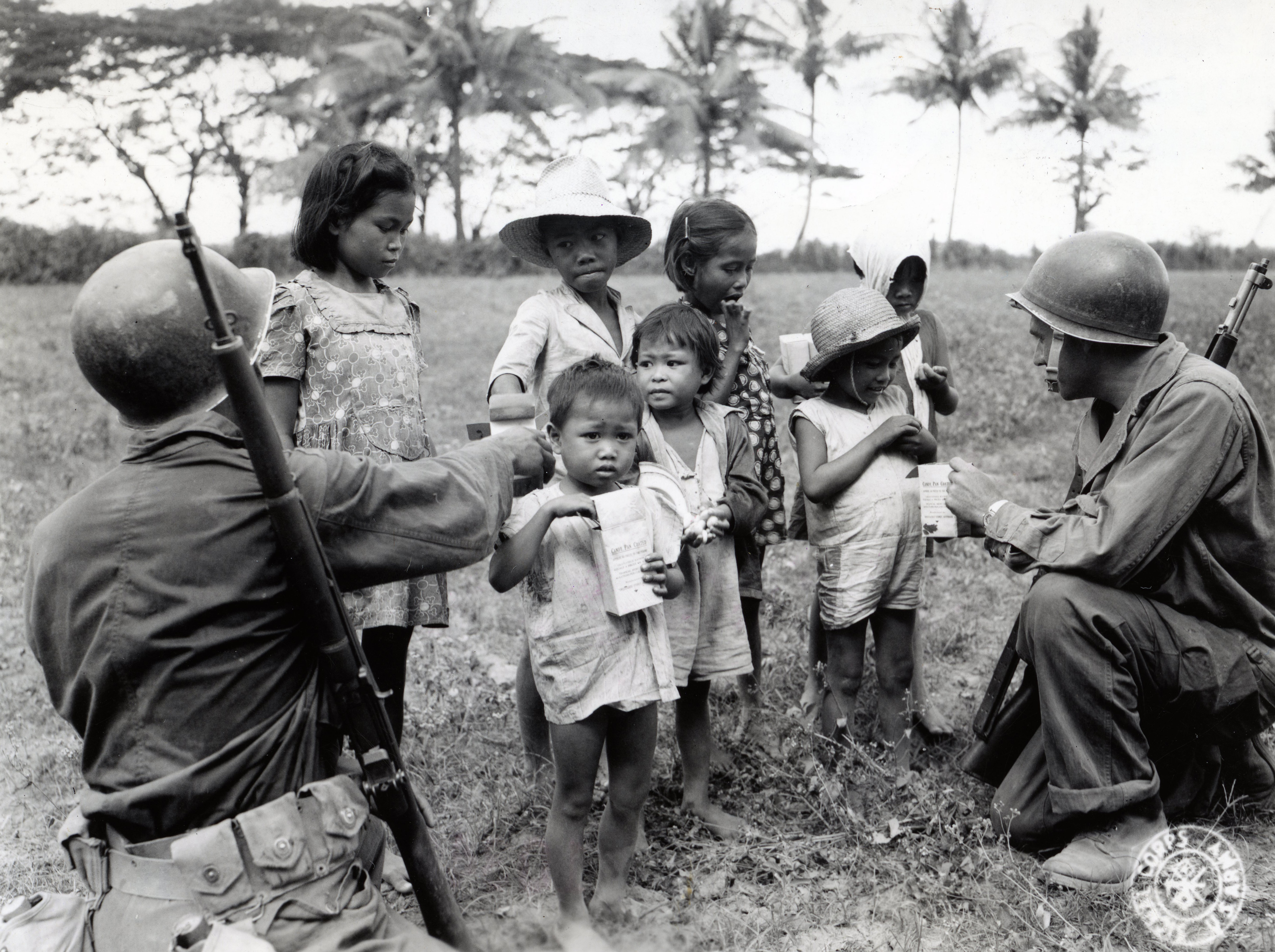
Pvt. Gerson (right) and Pfc. Philip H. Dunbar give Christmas candy to Filipino children in San Jose, Mindoro Island, December 25, 1944

Gerson (standing) reviews election returns with Robert G. Thompson, Israel Amter, and Benjamin J. Davis Jr. at the Hotel McAlpin, November 7, 1946

In 1937, Gerson was appointed confidential examiner (also known as assistant) to Republican Manhattan Borough President-elect Stanley M. Isaacs, making him the first Communist to hold any appointed office in New York City. In this position, he was charged with handling complaints and ensuring other members of the borough president's staff did their jobs. He served from the beginning of 1938 until his resignation in September 1940; facing a legal challenge from the American Legion on his right to hold office, Gerson could not afford a legal team and the City Corporation Counsel refused to take his case. Gerson later served in the Pacific theater during World War II.

In 1947, incumbent Communist New York City Councilman Peter Cacchione unexpectedly died. Under city law, council vacancies had to be filled by a member of the same political party as the previous officeholder, but when the Communist Party nominated Gerson, the council refused on the grounds that the Communist Party was not legally a political party. Instead, the seat was left vacant, and a special election was held the following year. Although he received the nominations of the Communist and American Labor parties (earning 18,000 votes on the former ballot line and 132,000 votes on the latter), he came in third place with 15% of the vote, behind Republican Jacob P. Lefkowitz and Democrat Jack Kranis, the victor.

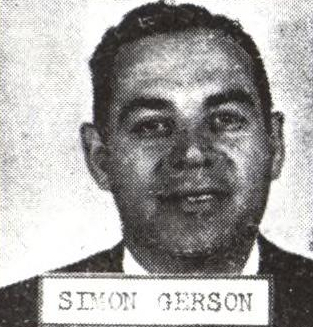
Gerson's FBI mugshot, 1951

On the morning of June 20, 1951, Gerson and 16 other Communist Party leaders were arrested by the FBI and charged with violating the Smith Act. In September 1952, Judge Edward J. Dimock dropped the charges against Gerson and Isidore Begun, arguing that there was insufficient evidence to convict them.

In 1958, Gerson co-signed an appeal urging the Communist Party not to purge John Gates and other reformists. After this failed, however, Gerson remained in the party. He later served as campaign manager for Gus Hall during the 1976, 1980, and 1984 presidential elections. As a legislative representative for the Communist Party, Gerson advocated for proportional representation and instant runoff voting, and served as secretary of the Coalition for Free and Open Elections.

== Personal life and death ==
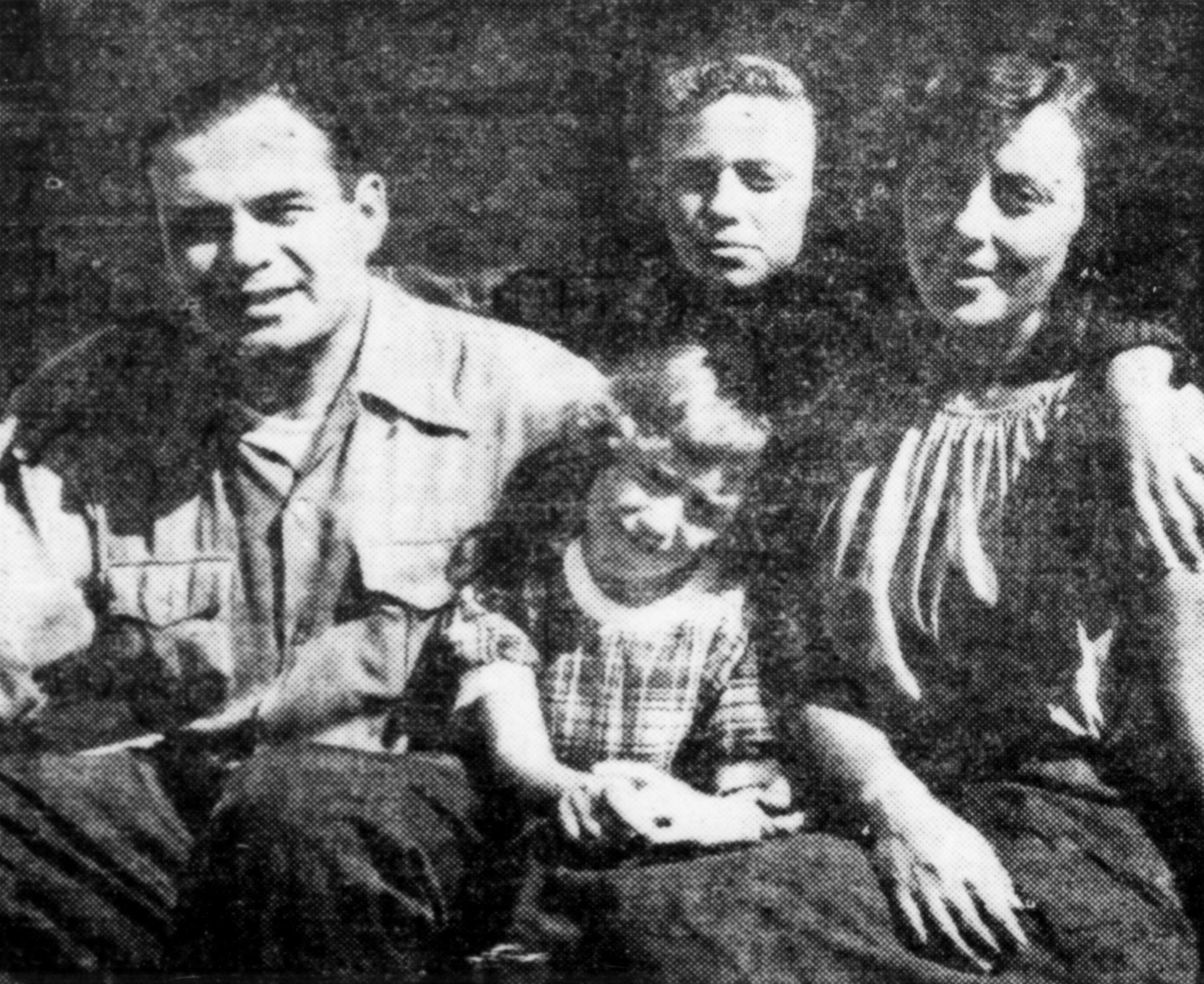
Gerson with his wife Sophie and their children c. 1953

Gerson married Sophie Melvin, the "Red flame" of the Communist Party, in 1932, with whom he had two children, William and Deborah. Melvin was a passionate union organizer who gained notoriety due to her involvement in the 1929 Loray Mill strike, during which she was imprisoned.

Gerson died in Brooklyn, New York on December 26, 2004.

== Legacy ==
Gerson and Melvin's papers were donated to the Tamiment Library after their deaths.

In his memoir A Long Journey, George Blake Charney, a former member of the Communist Party, characterized Gerson as follows:

I had come to know Si during our trial and during the underground period when we functioned, or rather suffered, together in the national administration committee under the baleful eyes of Foster, Gannett, and Perry. I had a warm admiration for his political abilities and acumen and for his vision. Si was an editor and a competent one; he was also a political man who aspired to office in the City Council... In the period before 1956 we had had so much in common in our judgment of people and policy. Si could not tolerate the windbags and with Alan Max conducted a consistent and witty campaign against "bagoo," the wooden language of the party and all the insufferable habits of the bureaucracy. We shared a common view about the need for radical changes. During the upheaval he joined Dennis, and in the course of time our relationship became somewhat strained. I suppose that I and the others felt that he belonged with us all the way, and that by standing with Dennis as the crisis sharpened he had violated our trust and his own convictions as well. I suppose, too, that his dilemma was that he aspired to be the liberal and the Communist at the same time, to resolve the dichotomy between the vanguard and the United Front—the Dimitrov man.

— George Blake Charney, A Long Journey, 1968

== Cartoon gallery ==
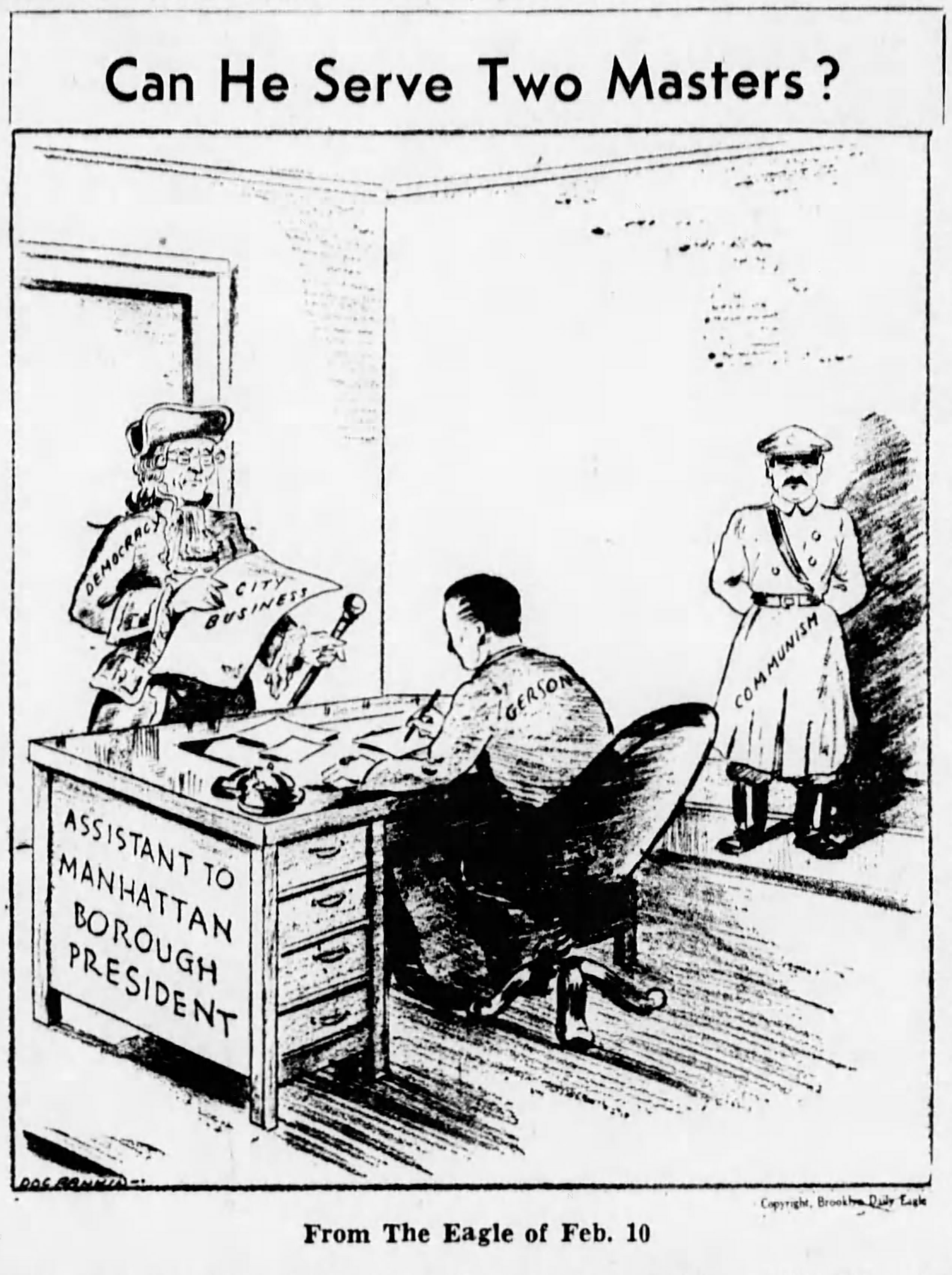
"Can He Serve Two Masters?" Brooklyn Daily Eagle, February 20, 1938

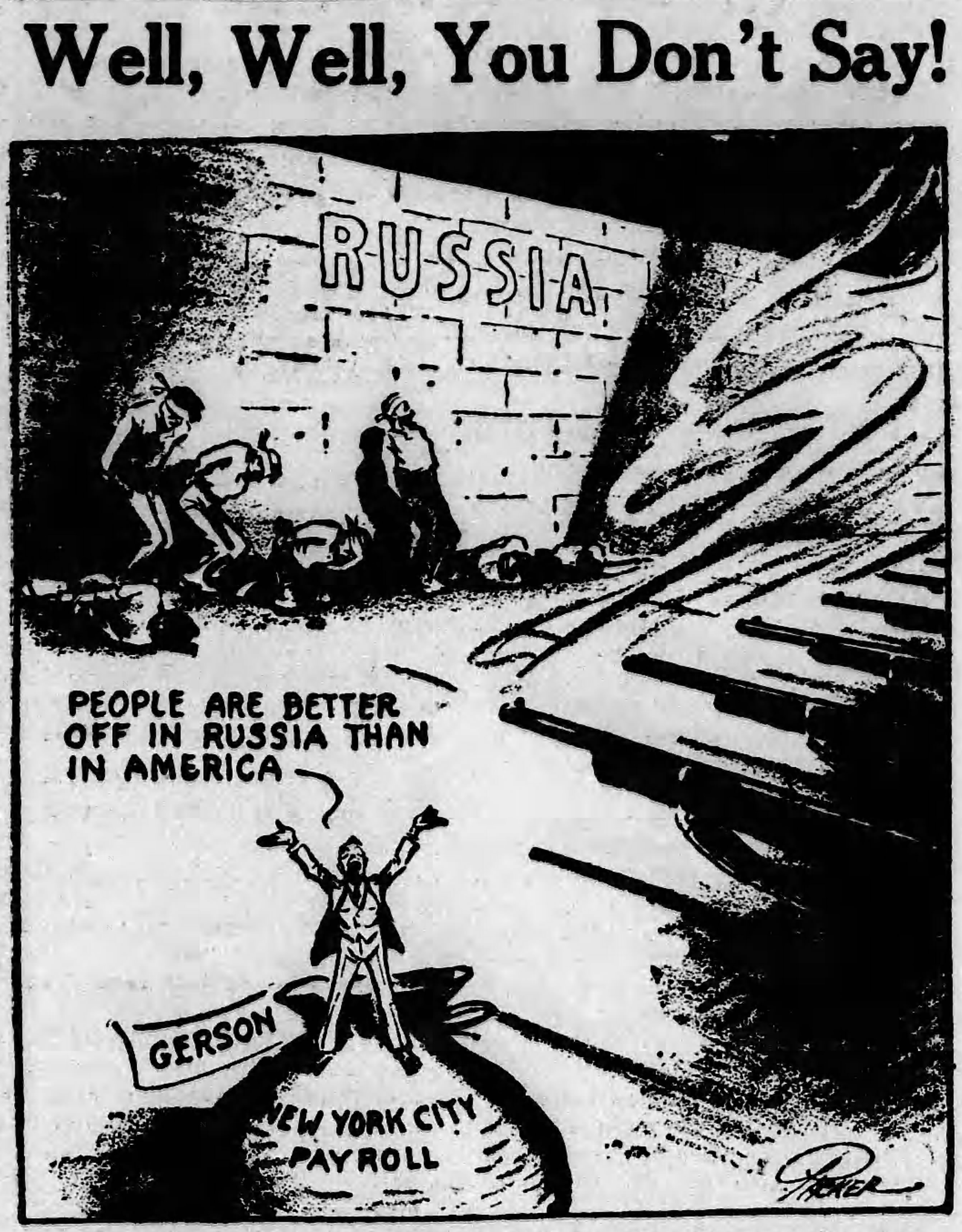
"Well, Well, You Don't Say!" The Oakland Post Enquirer, May 26, 1938

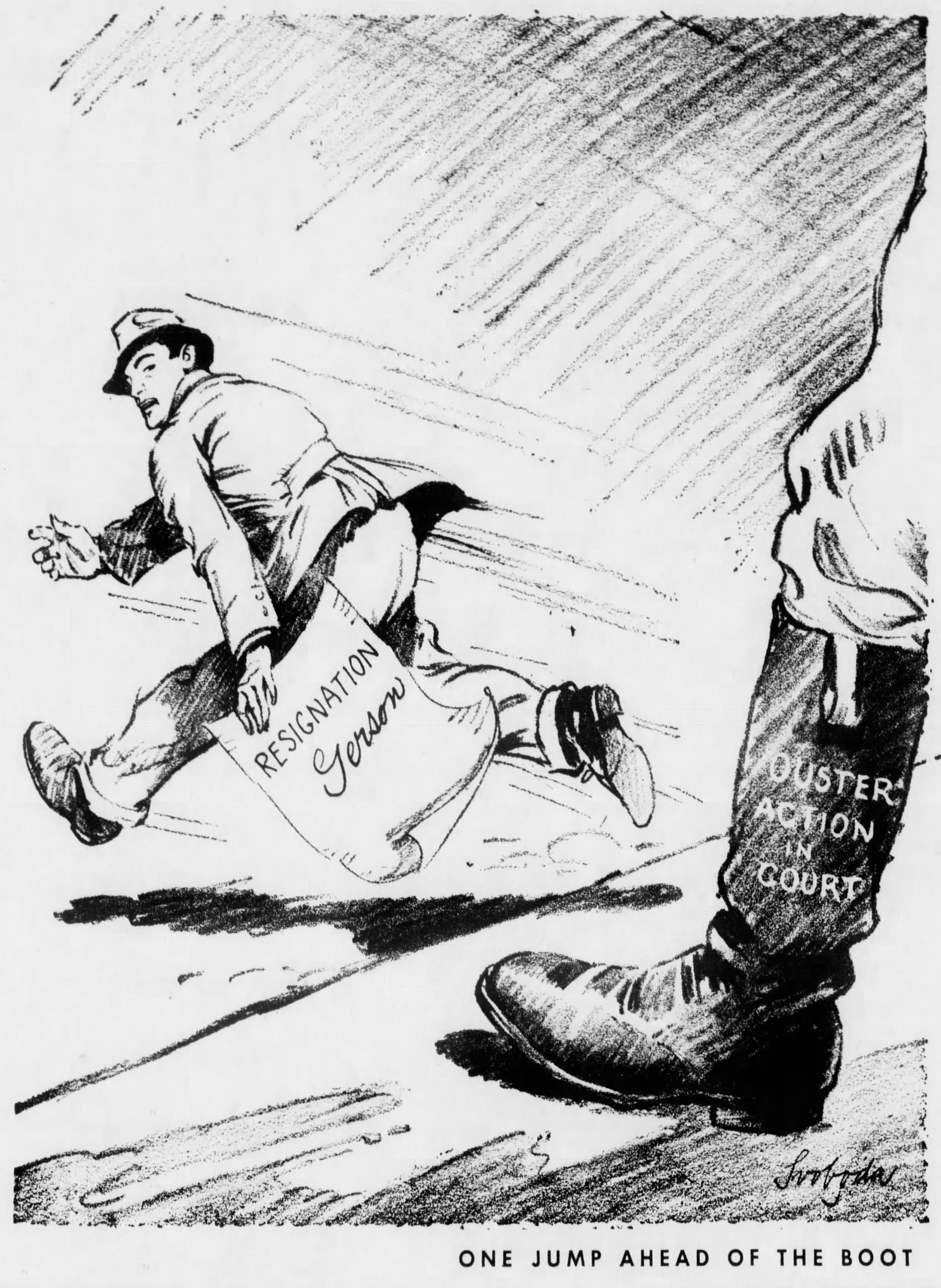
"One Jump Ahead of the Boot" Brooklyn Daily Eagle, September 29, 1940

== Works ==
- Pete Cacchione – His Record. New York: Workers Library Publishers. October 1943.
- Either the Constitution or the Mundt Bill: America Can't Have Both!. New York: New Century Publishers. June 1950.
- Pete: The Story of Peter V. Cacchione, New York's First Communist Councilman. New York: International Publishers. 1976.
- After Fifty Years: Revisiting the U.S.S.R. New York: International Publishers. 1978.
- Do We Have Free Elections?. New York: International Publishers.
