= Free the Vote North Carolina =

Organization

- Founded: June 14, 2008
- Founder: Jordon M. Greene
- Type: Issue Advocacy PAC
- Purpose: Ballot access and Candidate Nomination Reform
- Location: Charlotte, North Carolina
- Region served: North Carolina
- Method: Education, Advocacy
- Revenue: Donations

Free the Vote North Carolina (founded in June 2008) is a North Carolina-focused Political Action Committee with the primary goal of lobbying for ballot access reform, to reduce burden on political third parties and unaffiliated candidates. The group seeks to educate North Carolinians about ballot access in their state, and equip voters with the knowledge of where candidates stand on voting right. They also advocate for the reformation of the State's candidate nomination system, and the system of primary elections.

Free the Vote North Carolina was founded as the North Carolinians for Free and Proper Elections, or NCFPE, in June 2008 by Jordon M. Greene, who at the time was a sophomore political science major at the University of North Carolina at Charlotte.

== Legislative projects ==
=== 2009 ===
In 2009, the NCFPE introduced its first legislative project in ballot access law with its Electoral Freedom Act of 2009. The bill was introduced by North Carolina State Senator Jim Jacumin on March 19, 2009 as Senate Bill 731. Soon after, North Carolina State Senator Andrew C. Brock signed on as a Co-Sponsor of the bill.

On March 24, 2009, the bill was referred to the Senate Committee on the Judiciary I, where it was never brought back up; it died in committee when it missed the legislative cross-over deadline for non-appropriation/budget bills. The goal of the Electoral Freedom Act of 2009 was to amend NC Election Law in NCGS Chapter 163 to reduce the number of signatures needed for political third parties and unaffiliated candidates to obtain access to the NC election ballot.

=== 2011 ===
On February 3, 2011, Free the Vote North Carolina's 2011 ballot access reform bill proposal was introduced by State Representatives Stephen LaRoque, Glen Bradley, Paul Luebke and Jean Farmer-Butterfield in the form of House Bill 32 – the Electoral Freedom Act of 2011. The goal of this bill was similar to that of the bill proposed in 2009, but it would also have eliminated the existing requirement for write-in candidates to obtain signatures in order for their votes to be counted.

== Lawsuits ==
Free the Vote North Carolina (as the NCFPE), along with other organizations, submitted an amicus curiae brief in support of the Libertarian Party of NC and NC Green Party's case against the State of North Carolina and appealing the decision made by the North Carolina Court of Appeals in favor of the State on October 20, 2009. On March 11, 2011, the North Carolina Supreme Court, in a 5–1 decision, ruled in favor of the State, upholding North Carolina's existing ballot access rules.

Free the Vote North Carolina supported Stephen LaRoque in a case in Kinston, NC, where the US Department of Justice used Section 5 of the Voting Rights Act to deny a voter-approved referendum to change all local elections into non-partisan races. The lawsuit (Stephen LaRoque, et al. v. Eric H. Holder, Jr., et al.) challenged the ability of the federal government to clear or approve election laws passed locally or by states. In December 2010, a US court dismissed the case, stating that the citizens of Kinston, NC do not have standing.

Free the Vote North Carolina supported, and was formed as a response to, the plaintiffs in Bryan E. Greene, et al. v. Gary O. Bartlett, et al. The suit challenged the constitutionality of the NCGS 163-122(a)(2) requirement that unaffiliated candidates for US Congress and other district offices obtain signatures from 4% of the total number of registered voters in their district as of January 1 of the election year. Jordon M. Greene is a plaintiff in the lawsuit along with the primary plaintiff, Bryan E. Greene, who is Jordon's father. In August 2010, a US District Court upheld the law being challenged, siding with the state. Bryan Greene filed an appeal to the court's decision on November 16, 2010.
