= Ballot Access News =

US-based online and print newsletter

- Publisher: Richard Winger
- Editor: Richard Winger and Bill Redpath
- Founded: 1985
- Headquarters: San Francisco, California
- Website: https://ballot-access.org/

Ballot Access News is a United States–based website and monthly online and print newsletter edited and published by Bill Redpath and Richard Winger.

== History ==
Richard Winger, an expert on ballot access law in the United States, started the newsletter to advocate "fair and equitable ballot access laws" in 1985.

On June 1, 2023, Richard Winger announced that Bill Redpath, former chair of the Libertarian National Committee, would replace him as editor of the newsletter. However, Winger continues to write as a co-editor.

== Content ==
Ballot Access News reports on state and federal court decisions, compares American ballot access laws to those of other democratic nations, covers developments on electoral systems such as instant-runoff voting, and documents the number of votes independent and minor party candidates receive. The newsletter also records the activities of the Coalition for Free and Open Elections, an interest group of minor party members and others working together on ballot access law reform issues.

== Notable citations ==
Reporting by Ballot Access News has been cited by ABC News, Politico, Reuters, and the Washington Post.
