= Richard Winger =

American blogger

- Born: Richard Lee Winger; August 27, 1943 (age 83); Antioch, California, U.S.
- Education: University of California, Berkeley
- Occupations: Political activist and analyst
- Political party: Libertarian Party (since 1972)
- Spouse(s): Jarrold Kunz (m. 2008; died 2023) Brian Hauptli (m. 2025)

Richard Lee Winger (born August 27, 1943) is an American political activist and analyst. He is the publisher and editor of Ballot Access News. He sits on the editorial board of the Election Law Journal. Winger publishes analysis, statistics and legal information and supports expanded access to the ballot for minor parties.

== Political expertise and activism ==
Winger is widely regarded as an expert on ballot access and election law, as well as on the topic of third-party politics in the United States. Though not an attorney, Winger periodically testifies in court cases and legislative hearings and is a source for both the media and political organizers. He has been published in The Wall Street Journal, Journal of Election Law, the Fordham Urban Law Review, American Review of Politics, California Journal and other publications. He has appeared as a commentator on ballot access on NBC, ABC, CNN, and NPR. Since 1985, Winger has published Ballot Access News, a monthly newsletter covering developments in ballot access law and among American minor parties generally.

On June 1, 2023, Winger announced his retirement from Ballot Access News. However, he continues to write on the website as a co-editor.

=== Coalition for Free and Open Elections ===
In 1985, Richard Winger co-founded, along with several minor party representatives, the Coalition for Free and Open Elections (COFOE). The group attempts to co-ordinate action and provide mutual support among the various minor parties for efforts to liberalize and reform ballot access laws.

=== Electoral politics ===
Winger has been a member of the Libertarian Party since 1972 but is not active with its leadership.

Winger has made one run for public office, a 1986 campaign for Secretary of State of California on the Libertarian ballot line. As he was running for the office charged with the administration of elections, the campaign was styled as being nonpartisan, intended to represent the interests of all minor parties. Winger finished fourth among five candidates with 1.5% of the vote.

== Personal life ==
Richard Winger was born and raised in Antioch, California. He graduated from the University of California, Berkeley as a Political Science major in 1966, and attended Graduate School in Political Science at UCLA. He is gay and had been in a relationship with Jarrold Kunz since 1973. They married in 2008 after California started to issue marriage licenses to the same sex couples and their marriage lasted until Kunz's death in 2023. In 2025, he remarried Brian Hauptli. Winger lives in Marina District, San Francisco.
