= 2020 United States presidential election in Ohio =

- November 3, 2020
- Turnout: 73.99% (▲2.66 pp)

Nominee	Donald Trump	Joe Biden
Party	Republican	Democratic
Home state	Florida	Delaware
Running mate	Mike Pence	Kamala Harris
Electoral vote	18	0
Popular vote	3,154,834	2,679,165
Percentage	53.27%	45.24%

Trump
40–50%
50–60%
60–70%
70–80%
80–90%
90–100%
Biden
40–50%
50–60%
60–70%
70–80%
80–90%
90–100%
Tie/no data
President before election
Donald Trump
Republican
Elected President
Joe Biden
Democratic

The 2020 United States presidential election in Ohio was held on Tuesday, November 3, 2020, as part of the 2020 United States presidential election in which all 50 states plus the District of Columbia participated. Ohio voters chose electors to represent them in the Electoral College via a popular vote, pitting the Democratic Party nominee, former Vice President Joe Biden and his running mate, California Senator Kamala Harris against the Republican Party's nominee—incumbent President Donald Trump and his running mate, Vice President Mike Pence. Ohio had 18 electoral votes in the Electoral College.

Despite polling showing a very narrow Trump lead, Trump won Ohio with 53.27% of the vote, defeating Biden who received 45.24% of the vote, a margin of 8.03%. Trump won by nearly the same margin that he defeated Hillary Clinton by in 2016. This marked the first time since 1960 that Ohio voted for the losing candidate, breaking a streak of the state voting for 14 consecutive winning candidates that began in 1964. This is the second consecutive election in which the state voted over 10 points to the right of the nation as a whole, evidencing the state's trend towards the Republican Party. With Trump's win in Ohio in 2024, this is the only election between the years of 1964 and 2024 in which Ohio voted for the losing candidate.

Biden became the first Democrat since John F. Kennedy in 1960 to win the White House without carrying Ohio and the first since Franklin D. Roosevelt in 1932 to win the White House without carrying the heavily unionized carmaking counties of Mahoning and Trumbull, the first Democrat since Harry S. Truman in 1948 to win the White House without carrying Lorain County, the first Democrat since JFK in 1960 to win the White House without Ashtabula, Ottawa, or Portage Counties, and the first since Jimmy Carter in 1976 to win without Erie, Stark, or Wood Counties. Furthermore, this is the first time since 1976 that Ohio voted to the right of Texas - a state that last voted Democratic that year. Additionally, this is the first time since 1892 that an incumbent president carried the state while losing reelection nationally. Trump won 81 of Ohio's 88 counties compared to 80 in 2016, the most since Ronald Reagan won 82 in 1984.

Ohio is one of only three states that voted twice for Barack Obama and thrice for Trump, the other two being Florida and Iowa.

== Primary elections ==
The primary elections were originally scheduled for March 17, 2020. However, on March 16, Governor Mike DeWine recommended moving the primaries to June amid concerns over the COVID-19 pandemic. As the governor does not have the power to unilaterally make this decision, he went to court to request the delay. However, a judge rejected the lawsuit. Later in the day, the state's health director ordered the polls closed as a health emergency. On March 17, the Ohio Supreme Court allowed the primaries to be postponed to June 2. Then on March 25, in-person voting was canceled, and the deadline for mail-in voting was moved back to April 28.

=== Republican primary ===
Incumbent President Donald Trump ran unopposed in the Republican primary, and thus received all of Ohio's 82 delegates to the 2020 Republican National Convention.

2020 Ohio Republican primary
Candidate	Votes	%	Delegates
Donald Trump	713,546	100.00	82
Total	713,546	100%	82

=== Democratic primary ===
2020 Ohio Democratic presidential primary
Candidate	Votes	%	Delegates
Joe Biden	647,284	72.37	115
Bernie Sanders (withdrawn)	149,683	16.74	21
Elizabeth Warren (withdrawn)	30,985	3.46	
Michael Bloomberg (withdrawn)	28,704	3.21	
Pete Buttigieg (withdrawn)	15,113	1.69	
Amy Klobuchar (withdrawn)	11,899	1.33	
Tulsi Gabbard (withdrawn)	4,560	0.51	
Tom Steyer (withdrawn)	2,801	0.31	
Michael Bennet (withdrawn)	2,030	0.23	
Deval Patrick (withdrawn)	822	0.09	
Andrew Yang (write-in; withdrawn)	502	0.06	
Total	894,383	100%	136

== General election ==
=== Final predictions ===
Source	Ranking
The Cook Political Report	Tossup
Inside Elections	Tossup
Sabato's Crystal Ball	Lean R
Politico	Tossup
RCP	Tossup
Niskanen	Tossup
CNN	Tossup
The Economist	Tossup
CBS News	Tossup
270towin	Tossup
ABC News	Tossup
NPR	Tossup
NBC News	Tossup
538	Tossup

=== Polling ===
View source data.

Aggregate polls

Source of poll aggregation	Dates administered	Dates updated	Joe Biden Democratic	Donald Trump Republican	Other/ Undecided (Note: Calculated by taking the difference of 100% and all other candidates combined.)	Margin
270 to Win	November 1–2, 2020	November 3, 2020	46.7%	47.6%	5.7%	Trump +0.9
Real Clear Politics	October 28, 2020 – November 1, 2020	November 3, 2020	46.3%	47.3%	6.4%	Trump +1.0
FiveThirtyEight	until November 2, 2020	November 3, 2020	46.6%	47.5%	5.7%	Trump +0.8
Average			46.6%	47.5%	5.9%	Trump +0.9

June 1, 2020 – October 31, 2020

Poll source	Date(s) administered	Sample size (Note: Key: A – all adults RV – registered voters LV – likely voters V – unclear)	Margin of error	Donald Trump Republican	Joe Biden Democratic	Jo Jorgensen Libertarian	Howie Hawkins Green	Other	Undecided
SurveyMonkey/Axios	Oct 20 – Nov 2	6,025 (LV)	± 2%	51% (Note: Overlapping sample with the previous SurveyMonkey/Axios poll, but more information available regarding sample size)	47%	–	–	–	–
Pulse Opinion Research/Rasmussen Reports	Oct 31 – Nov 1	800 (LV)	± 3.5%	49%	45%	–	–	3% (Note: "Some other candidate" with 3%)	–
Research Co.	Oct 31 – Nov 1	450 (LV)	± 4.6%	47%	47%	–	–	2% (Note: "Someone else" with 2%)	4%
Swayable	Oct 27 – Nov 1	516 (LV)	± 5.8%	52%	47%	1%	0%	–	–
Civiqs/Daily Kos	Oct 29 – Nov 1	1,136 (LV)	± 3%	49%	48%	–	–	1% (Note: "Someone else" with 1%)	1%
Quinnipiac University	Oct 28 – Nov 1	1,440 (LV)	± 2.6%	43%	47%	–	–	2%	8%
Survey Monkey/Tableau	Oct 20 – Nov 1	5,305 (LV)	± 2.0%	50%	47%	–	–		–
Trafalgar Group	Oct 30–31	1,041 (LV)	± 2.96%	49%	44%	–	–	–	–
Emerson College	Oct 29–31	656 (LV)	± 3.8%	49% (Note: With voters who lean towards a given candidate)	50%	–	–	2%	–
Morning Consult	Oct 22–31	2,179 (LV)	± 2%	49%	47%	–	–	–	–
AtlasIntel	Oct 29–30	660 (LV)	± 4%	50%	47%	–	–	3%	–
Gravis Marketing	Oct 27–28	613 (LV)	± 4%	49%	47%	–	–	–	4%
SurveyMonkey/Axios	Oct 1–28, 2020	8,089 (LV)	–	51%	47%	–	–	–	–
Quinnipiac University	Oct 23–27	1,186 (LV)	± 2.9%	43%	48%	–	–	1%	8%
Swayable	Oct 23–26	440 (LV)	± 6.3%	55%	44%	1%	0%	–	–
Wick Surveys	Oct 24–25	1,000 (LV)	± 3.1%	49%	47%	–	–	–	–
Citizen Data	Oct 17–20	1,000 (LV)	± 3%	44%	43%	2%	1%	2%	8%
Fox News	Oct 17–20	1,018 (LV)	± 3%	48%	45%	3%	1%	1% (Note: "Other" with 1%; would not vote with no voters)	3%
Morning Consult	Oct 11–20	2,271 (LV)	± 2.1%	49%	47%	–	–	–	–
Pulse Opinion Research/Rasmussen Reports	Oct 18–19	800 (LV)	± 3.5%	47%	48%	–	–	2% (Note: "Some other candidate" with 2%)	4%
Quinnipiac University	Oct 8–12	1,160 (LV)	± 2.9%	47%	48%	–	–	2%	4%
Civiqs/Rust Belt Rising (Note: Rust Belt Rising is affiliated with the Democratic Party)	Oct 8–11	586 (LV)	± 4.2%	50%	47%	–	–	2%	1%
Morning Consult	Oct 2–11	2,283 (LV)	± 2.1%	49%	46%	–	–	–	–
Baldwin Wallace University	Sep 30 – Oct 8	1,009 (LV)	± 3.1%	47%	45%	1%	0%	1% (Note: "Another candidate" with 1%)	5%
Siena College/NYT Upshot	Oct 2–6	661 (LV)	± 4.3%	44%	45%	2%	1%	0% (Note: "Someone else" and would not vote with 0%)	7% (Note: Includes "Refused")
Trafalgar Group	Oct 1–3	1,035 (LV)	± 2.97%	48%	44%	3%	1%	1%	4%
YouGov/CBS	Sep 30 – Oct 2	1,114 (LV)	± 3.7%	47%	47%	–	–	1% (Note: "Someone else/third party" with 1%)	5%
OnMessage Inc./American Action Forum (Note: The American Action Forum is a 501 organization which usually supports Republican candidates)	Sep 28 – Oct 1	800 (LV)	± 3.46%	48%	47%	2%	1%	0% (Note: "Other" and would not vote with no voters)	3%
SurveyMonkey/Axios	Sep 1–30	4,012 (LV)	–	51%	47%	–	–	–	2%
Hart Research Associates/Human Rights Campaign (Note: The Human Rights Campaign endorsed Biden prior to this poll's sampling period)	Sep 24–27	400 (LV)	± 4.9%	49%	47%	–	–	–	–
Fox News	Sep 20–23	830 (LV)	± 3%	45%	50%	1%	1%	0% (Note: "Other" with 0%; would not vote with no voters)	2%
Fox News	Sep 20–23	907 (RV)	± 3%	44%	49%	1%	2%	2% (Note: "Other" and would not vote with 1%)	3%
Quinnipiac University	Sep 17–21	1,078 (LV)	± 3%	47%	48%	–	–	2%	4%
Baldwin Wallace University	Sep 9–22	1,011 (LV)	± 3.3%	44%	45%	2%	0%	1%	7%
Civiqs/Rust Belt Rising	Sep 11–15	556 (RV)	± 4.3%	48% (Note: Additional data sourced from FiveThirtyEight)	45%	–	–	5% (Note: "Someone else" with 5%)	1%
Morning Consult	Aug 29 – Sep 7	1,963 (LV)	± (2%–4%)	50% (Note: Overlapping sample with the previous Morning Consult poll, but more information available regarding sample size)	45%	–	–	–	–
OnMessage Inc./American Action Forum	Aug 31 – Sep 3	800 (LV)	± 3.46%	51%	45%	–	–	2%	3%
Pulse Opinion Research/Rasmussen Reports	Sep 1–2	1,000 (LV)	± 3%	47%	51%	–	–	3%	–
ALG Research/Progressive Policy Institute (Note: The Progressive Policy Institute endorsed Biden prior to this poll's sampling period)	Aug 26 – Sep 1	500 (LV)	–	46%	48%	–	–	–	–
SurveyMonkey/Axios	Aug 1–31	3,220 (LV)	–	51%	48%	–	–	–	2%
Morning Consult	Aug 21–30	1,811 (LV)	± (2%–4%)	50%	45%	–	–	–	–
Civiqs/Rust Belt Rising	Aug 13–17	631 (RV)	–	47%	47%	–	–	4% (Note: "Someone else" with 4%)	2%
Morning Consult	Aug 7–16	1,744 (LV)	± (2%–4%)	49%	45%	–	–	–	–
TargetSmart/Progress Ohio (Note: Progress Ohio exclusively supports Democratic candidates)	Jul 28 – Aug 3	1,249 (LV)	± 3.6%	46%	47%	–	–	8% (Note: "Other and Undecided" with 8%)	–
SurveyMonkey/Axios	Jul 1–31	3,694 (LV)	–	52%	46%	–	–	–	2%
Morning Consult	Jul 17–26	1,741 (LV)	± 2.3%	48%	45%	–	–	–	–
YouGov/CBS	Jul 21–24	1,211 (LV)	± 3.6%	46%	45%	–	–	2% (Note: "Someone else/third party" with 2%; would not vote with 0%)	7%
Zogby Analytics	Jul 21–23	805 (RV)	± 3.5%	41%	43%	4%	1%	–	11%
Pulse Opinion Research/Rasmussen Reports/AGPAC (Note: The Center for American Greatness is a pro-Trump organization)	Jul 15–16	750 (LV)	± 4%	46%	50%	–	–	2%	2%
University of Akron	Jun 24 – Jul 15	1,037 (RV)	± 3.0%	42%	46%	–	–	6% (Note: "Other candidates" with 6%)	6%
SurveyMonkey/Axios	Jun 8–30	1,610 (LV)	–	50%	49%	–	–	–	1%
Quinnipiac	Jun 18–22	1,139 (RV)	± 2.9%	45%	46%	–	–	4% (Note: "Someone else" with 3%; would not vote with 1%)	5%
Fox News	May 30 – Jun 2	803 (RV)	± 3.5%	43%	45%	–	–	6% (Note: "Other" with 4%; would not vote with 2%)	6%

January 1, 2020 – May 31, 2020

Poll source	Date(s) administered	Sample size	Margin of error	Donald Trump Republican	Joe Biden Democratic	Other	Undecided
Morning Consult	May 17–26	1,720 (LV)	–	50%	42%	–	–
Emerson College	May 8–10	725 (RV)	± 3.5%	51% (Note: Including voters who lean towards a given candidate)	49%	–	–
Baldwin Wallace University/Oakland University/Ohio Northern University	Apr 20–25	797 (RV)	± 3.7%	44%	45%	–	11%
Baldwin Wallace University Great Lakes	Mar 17–25	1,025 (RV)	± 3.3%	47%	43%	–	10%
Change Research	Mar 21–23	510 (LV)	–	52%	44%	–	5%
NBC News/The Wall Street Journal/Marist College	Mar 10–13	1,710 (RV)	± 2.9%	45%	49%	1%	5%

January 1, 2018 – December 31, 2019

Poll source	Date(s) administered	Sample size	Margin of error	Donald Trump Republican	Joe Biden Democratic	Other	Undecided
Public Policy Polling	Oct 10–11, 2019	776 (V)	± 3.5%	46%	48%	–	6%
Climate Nexus (Note: The poll below displays the results for voters who are sure how they will vote. This one incorporates the preferences of those who lean towards one of two candidates.)	Oct 1–7, 2019	1112 (LV)	± 2.9%	47%	53%	–	–
Climate Nexus	Oct 1–7, 2019	1112 (LV)	± 2.9%	42%	48%	–	10%
Emerson College	Sep 29 – October 2, 2019	837 (RV)	± 3.2%	47%	53%	–	–
Quinnipiac University	Jul 17–22, 2019	1,431 (RV)	± 3.2%	42%	50%	–	–
Public Policy Polling	Nov 27–28, 2018	648 (V)	± 3.9%	44%	48%	–	8%

Former candidates

Donald Trump vs. Cory Booker

Poll source	Date(s) administered	Sample size	Margin of error	Donald Trump (R)	Cory Booker (D)	Undecided
Quinnipiac University	Jul 17–22, 2019	1,431 (RV)	± 3.2%	44%	43%	–

Donald Trump vs. Pete Buttigieg

Poll source	Date(s) administered	Sample size	Margin of error	Donald Trump (R)	Pete Buttigieg (D)	Undecided
Public Policy Polling	Oct 10–11, 2019	776 (V)	± 3.5%	47%	43%	10%
Climate Nexus	Oct 1–7, 2019	1112 (LV)	± 2.9%	50%	50%	–
Climate Nexus	Oct 1–7, 2019	1112 (LV)	± 2.9%	46%	43%	11%
Quinnipiac University	Jul 17–22, 2019	1,431 (RV)	± 3.2%	44%	44%	–

Donald Trump vs. Kamala Harris

Poll source	Date(s) administered	Sample size	Margin of error	Donald Trump (R)	Kamala Harris (D)	Undecided
Public Policy Polling	Oct 10–11, 2019	776 (V)	± 3.5%	47%	43%	10%
Climate Nexus	Oct 1–7, 2019	1112 (LV)	± 2.9%	50%	50%	–
Climate Nexus	Oct 1–7, 2019	1112 (LV)	± 2.9%	46%	43%	11%
Quinnipiac University	Jul 17–22, 2019	1,431 (RV)	± 3.2%	44%	44%	–

Donald Trump vs. Bernie Sanders

Poll source	Date(s) administered	Sample size	Margin of error	Donald Trump (R)	Bernie Sanders (D)	Other	Undecided
Baldwin Wallace University Great Lakes	Mar 17–25, 2020	1,025 (RV)	± 3.3%	47%	41%	–	12%
NBC News/The Wall Street Journal/Marist College	Mar 10–13, 2020	1,710 (RV)	± 2.9%	46%	48%	1%	5%
Public Policy Polling	Oct 10–11, 2019	776 (V)	± 3.5%	47%	47%	–	7%
Climate Nexus	Oct 1–7, 2019	1112 (LV)	± 2.9%	48%	52%	–	–
Climate Nexus	Oct 1–7, 2019	1112 (LV)	± 2.9%	45%	47%	–	8%
Emerson College	Sep 29 – Oct 2, 2019	837 (RV)	± 3.2%	47%	53%	–	–
Quinnipiac University	Jul 17–22, 2019	1,431 (RV)	± 3.2%	46%	45%	–	–
Public Policy Polling	Nov 27–28, 2018	648 (V)	± 3.9%	46%	47%	–	7%

Donald Trump vs. Elizabeth Warren

Poll source	Date(s) administered	Sample size	Margin of error	Donald Trump (R)	Elizabeth Warren (D)	Undecided
Public Policy Polling	Oct 10–11, 2019	776 (V)	± 3.5%	47%	47%	6%
Climate Nexus	Oct 1–7, 2019	1112 (LV)	± 2.9%	49%	51%	–
Climate Nexus	Oct 1–7, 2019	1112 (LV)	± 2.9%	45%	46%	9%
Emerson College	Sep 29 – Oct 2, 2019	837 (RV)	± 3.2%	48%	52%	–
Quinnipiac University	Jul 17–22, 2019	1,431 (RV)	± 3.2%	46%	45%	–
Public Policy Polling	Nov 27–28, 2018	648 (V)	± 3.9%	49%	43%	9%
Zogby Analytics	Aug 17–23, 2017	805 (LV)	± 3.5%	40%	44%	16%

Hypothetical polling

with Donald Trump and Sherrod Brown

Poll source	Date(s) administered	Sample size	Margin of error	Donald Trump (R)	Sherrod Brown (D)	Undecided
Public Policy Polling	Nov 27–28, 2018	648 (V)	± 3.9%	42%	48%	10%

with Mike Pence and Joe Biden

Poll source	Date(s) administered	Sample size	Margin of error	Mike Pence (R)	Joe Biden (D)
Emerson College	Sep 29 – Oct 2, 2019	837 (RV)	± 3.2%	46%	54%

with Mike Pence and Bernie Sanders

Poll source	Date(s) administered	Sample size	Margin of error	Mike Pence (R)	Bernie Sanders (D)
Emerson College	Sep 29 – Oct 2, 2019	837 (RV)	± 3.2%	49%	51%

with Mike Pence and Elizabeth Warren

Poll source	Date(s) administered	Sample size	Margin of error	Mike Pence (R)	Elizabeth Warren (D)
Emerson College	Sep 29 – Oct 2, 2019	837 (RV)	± 3.2%	49%	51%

with Donald Trump and Generic Democrat

Poll source	Date(s) administered	Sample size	Margin of error	Donald Trump (R)	Generic Democrat (D)	Other	Undecided
Baldwin Wallace University/Oakland University/Ohio Northern University	Mar 17–25, 2020	997 (RV)	± 3.7%	49.4% (Note: Figures for each candidate in this poll include undecided voters who were reported to lean towards that candidate at the time of polling.)	48.3%	–	2.1% (Note: "It depends on who the Democrats nominate" with 1.4%; "unsure" with 0.7%)
Baldwin Wallace University/Oakland University/Ohio Northern University	Jan 8–20, 2020	1,031 (RV)	± 3.1%	41.3%	47.1%	–	11.5%
Public Policy Polling	Oct 10–11, 2019	776 (V)	± 3.5%	47%	48%	–	5%
Ohio Northern University	Apr 5–10, 2019	1,505 (A)	± 2.7%	34%	41%	–	18%
Baldwin Wallace University	Apr 24 – May 2, 2018	811 (RV)	± 3.5%	41%	44%	6%	9%
Baldwin Wallace University	Feb 28 – Mar 9, 2018	1,011 (RV)	± 3.0%	34%	32%	–	–

with John Kasich and Generic Democrat

Poll source	Date(s) administered	Sample size	Margin of error	John Kasich (R)	Generic Democrat	Other	Undecided
Baldwin Wallace University	Apr 24 – May 2, 2018	811 (RV)	± 3.5%	37%	31%	13%	19%
Baldwin Wallace University	Feb 28 – Mar 9, 2018	1,011 (RV)	± 3.0%	41%	20%	12%	–

=== Results ===
State Senate district results: Trump 50–60% 60–70% 70–80% / Biden 50–60% 60–70% 70–80% 80–90%

2020 United States presidential election in Ohio
Party	Candidate	Votes	%	±%
Republican	Donald Trump Mike Pence	3,154,834	53.27%	+1.96%
Democratic	Joe Biden Kamala Harris	2,679,165	45.24%	+2.00%
Libertarian	Jo Jorgensen Spike Cohen	67,569	1.14%	−2.01%
Green	Howie Hawkins Angela Walker	18,812	0.32%	−0.52%
Write-in		1,822	0.03%	-0.99%
Total votes		5,922,202	100.00%	

==== By county ====
County	Donald Trump Republican		Joe Biden Democratic		Jo Jorgensen Libertarian		Howie Hawkins Green		Various candidates Other parties		Margin		Total votes cast
County	#	%	#	%	#	%	#	%	#	%	#	%	Total votes cast
Adams	9,870	81.27%	2,156	17.75%	92	0.76%	27	0.22%	0	0.00%	7,714	63.52%	12,145
Allen	33,116	68.85%	14,149	29.42%	590	1.23%	138	0.29%	106	0.22%	18,967	39.43%	48,099
Ashland	19,407	73.50%	6,541	24.77%	345	1.31%	105	0.40%	7	0.03%	12,866	48.73%	26,405
Ashtabula	26,890	60.79%	16,497	37.29%	559	1.26%	196	0.44%	95	0.21%	10,393	23.50%	44,237
Athens	10,862	41.58%	14,772	56.55%	299	1.14%	115	0.44%	72	0.28%	−3,910	−14.97%	26,120
Auglaize	20,798	80.54%	4,651	18.01%	260	1.01%	0	0.00%	113	0.44%	16,147	62.53%	25,822
Belmont	23,560	71.09%	9,138	27.57%	285	0.86%	98	0.30%	60	0.18%	14,422	43.52%	33,141
Brown	16,480	77.96%	4,380	20.72%	182	0.86%	54	0.26%	43	0.20%	12,100	57.24%	21,139
Butler	114,392	61.26%	69,613	37.28%	2,177	1.17%	493	0.26%	62	0.03%	44,779	23.98%	186,737
Carroll	10,745	75.49%	3,251	22.84%	156	1.10%	56	0.39%	25	0.18%	7,494	52.65%	14,233
Champaign	14,589	72.93%	5,062	25.31%	260	1.30%	55	0.27%	37	0.18%	9,527	47.62%	20,003
Clark	39,032	60.65%	24,076	37.41%	829	1.29%	245	0.38%	169	0.26%	14,956	23.24%	64,351
Clermont	74,570	67.36%	34,092	30.79%	1,513	1.37%	0	0.00%	535	0.48%	40,478	36.57%	110,710
Clinton	15,488	75.32%	4,697	22.84%	270	1.31%	67	0.33%	41	0.20%	10,791	52.48%	20,563
Columbiana	35,726	71.51%	13,359	26.74%	607	1.21%	162	0.32%	106	0.21%	22,367	44.77%	49,960
Coshocton	12,325	73.50%	4,125	24.60%	227	1.35%	62	0.37%	29	0.17%	8,200	48.90%	16,768
Crawford	15,436	74.52%	4,916	23.73%	278	1.34%	53	0.26%	30	0.14%	10,520	50.79%	20,713
Cuyahoga	202,699	32.32%	416,176	66.36%	4,593	0.73%	2,031	0.32%	1,661	0.26%	−213,477	−34.04%	627,160
Darke	22,004	81.01%	4,731	17.42%	331	1.22%	0	0.00%	95	0.35%	17,273	63.59%	27,161
Defiance	13,038	67.27%	5,981	30.86%	272	1.40%	78	0.40%	12	0.06%	7,057	36.41%	19,381
Delaware	66,356	52.51%	57,735	45.69%	1,630	1.29%	0	0.00%	653	0.52%	8,621	6.82%	126,374
Erie	22,160	54.83%	17,493	43.28%	522	1.29%	153	0.38%	88	0.22%	4,667	11.55%	40,416
Fairfield	50,797	60.97%	31,224	37.48%	1,033	1.24%	223	0.27%	34	0.04%	19,573	23.49%	83,311
Fayette	9,473	75.03%	2,975	23.56%	132	1.05%	32	0.25%	14	0.11%	6,498	51.47%	12,626
Franklin	211,237	33.40%	409,144	64.68%	7,718	1.22%	2,169	0.34%	2,264	0.26%	−197,907	−31.28%	632,532
Fulton	15,731	68.98%	6,664	29.22%	299	1.31%	71	0.31%	41	0.18%	9,067	39.76%	22,806
Gallia	10,645	77.14%	2,990	21.67%	132	0.96%	32	0.23%	0	0.00%	7,655	55.47%	13,799
Geauga	34,143	60.95%	21,201	37.84%	534	0.95%	0	0.00%	143	0.26%	12,942	23.11%	56,021
Greene	52,072	58.74%	34,798	39.26%	1,458	1.64%	264	0.30%	51	0.06%	17,274	19.48%	88,643
Guernsey	13,407	73.41%	4,577	25.06%	177	0.97%	67	0.37%	36	0.20%	8,830	48.35%	18,264
Hamilton	177,886	41.28%	246,266	57.15%	5,211	1.21%	1,389	0.32%	177	0.04%	−68,380	−15.87%	430,929
Hancock	26,310	67.86%	11,757	30.32%	580	1.50%	110	0.28%	14	0.04%	14,553	37.54%	38,771
Hardin	9,949	75.10%	3,062	23.11%	192	1.45%	44	0.33%	0	0.00%	6,887	51.99%	13,247
Harrison	5,792	75.58%	1,768	23.07%	59	0.77%	36	0.47%	8	0.10%	4,024	52.51%	7,663
Henry	10,479	70.86%	4,062	27.47%	175	1.18%	44	0.30%	28	0.19%	6,417	43.39%	14,788
Highland	15,678	79.68%	3,799	19.31%	146	0.74%	0	0.00%	53	0.27%	11,879	60.37%	19,676
Hocking	9,737	70.28%	3,880	28.00%	162	1.17%	40	0.29%	36	0.26%	5,857	42.28%	13,855
Holmes	10,796	83.19%	1,994	15.36%	125	0.96%	0	0.00%	63	0.49%	8,802	67.83%	12,978
Huron	18,956	69.72%	7,759	28.54%	387	1.42%	83	0.31%	53	0.02%	11,197	41.18%	27,190
Jackson	11,309	76.36%	3,311	22.36%	144	0.97%	0	0.00%	46	0.31%	7,998	54.00%	14,810
Jefferson	22,828	68.30%	10,018	29.98%	357	1.07%	100	0.30%	118	0.35%	12,810	38.32%	33,421
Knox	22,340	71.01%	8,589	27.30%	374	1.19%	86	0.27%	70	0.22%	13,751	43.71%	31,459
Lake	73,278	56.03%	55,514	42.45%	1,284	0.98%	408	0.31%	298	0.23%	17,764	13.58%	130,782
Lawrence	20,306	72.06%	7,489	26.58%	259	0.92%	0	0.00%	125	0.44%	12,817	45.48%	28,179
Licking	59,514	63.05%	33,055	35.02%	1,279	1.35%	312	0.33%	236	0.25%	26,459	28.03%	94,396
Logan	17,964	76.74%	5,055	21.59%	272	1.16%	69	0.29%	49	0.21%	12,909	55.15%	23,409
Lorain	79,520	50.40%	75,667	47.96%	1,677	1.06%	534	0.34%	370	0.23%	3,853	2.44%	157,768
Lucas	81,763	40.66%	115,411	57.39%	2,605	1.30%	780	0.39%	548	0.27%	−33,648	−16.73%	201,107
Madison	13,835	69.57%	5,698	28.65%	269	1.35%	0	0.00%	85	0.43%	8,137	40.92%	19,887
Mahoning	59,903	50.26%	57,641	48.36%	966	0.81%	436	0.37%	244	0.20%	2,262	1.90%	119,190
Marion	19,023	68.25%	8,269	29.67%	414	1.49%	112	0.40%	53	0.19%	10,754	38.58%	27,871
Medina	64,598	60.92%	39,800	37.53%	1,144	1.08%	266	0.25%	233	0.22%	24,798	23.39%	106,041
Meigs	8,316	75.83%	2,492	22.72%	111	1.01%	32	0.29%	16	0.15%	5,824	53.11%	10,967
Mercer	19,452	81.79%	4,030	16.94%	204	0.86%	67	0.28%	31	0.13%	15,422	64.85%	23,784
Miami	41,371	71.23%	15,663	26.97%	782	1.35%	0	0.00%	261	0.45%	25,708	44.26%	58,077
Monroe	5,463	76.31%	1,605	22.42%	54	0.75%	26	0.36%	11	0.15%	3,858	53.89%	7,159
Montgomery	129,034	47.94%	135,064	50.18%	3,418	1.27%	884	0.33%	764	0.28%	−6,030	−2.24%	269,164
Morgan	5,041	73.53%	1,725	25.16%	64	0.93%	0	0.00%	26	0.38%	3,316	48.37%	6,856
Morrow	14,077	76.22%	4,048	21.92%	257	1.39%	70	0.38%	16	0.09%	10,029	54.30%	18,468
Muskingum	27,867	68.86%	11,971	29.58%	459	1.13%	163	0.40%	7	0.02%	15,896	39.28%	40,467
Noble	5,135	80.89%	1,170	18.43%	25	0.39%	0	0.00%	18	0.28%	3,965	62.46%	6,348
Ottawa	14,628	60.83%	9,008	37.46%	292	1.21%	74	0.31%	44	0.18%	5,628	23.37%	24,046
Paulding	7,086	74.72%	2,213	23.33%	124	1.31%	38	0.40%	23	0.24%	4,873	51.39%	9,484
Perry	12,357	74.10%	4,098	24.57%	170	1.02%	47	0.28%	4	0.02%	8,259	49.53%	16,676
Pickaway	20,593	72.73%	7,304	25.80%	295	1.04%	0	0.00%	122	0.43%	13,289	46.93%	28,314
Pike	9,157	73.70%	3,110	25.03%	123	0.99%	0	0.00%	34	0.27%	6,047	48.67%	12,424
Portage	45,990	55.39%	35,661	42.95%	906	1.09%	295	0.36%	170	0.20%	10,329	12.44%	83,022
Preble	17,022	77.94%	4,493	20.57%	243	1.11%	0	0.00%	82	0.38%	12,529	57.37%	21,840
Putnam	16,412	82.28%	3,195	16.02%	247	1.24%	61	0.31%	32	0.16%	13,217	66.26%	19,947
Richland	41,472	69.15%	17,640	29.41%	680	1.13%	168	0.28%	15	0.03%	23,832	39.74%	59,975
Ross	22,278	66.77%	10,557	31.64%	345	1.03%	116	0.35%	69	0.21%	11,721	35.13%	33,365
Sandusky	18,896	62.72%	10,596	35.17%	448	1.49%	132	0.44%	56	0.19%	8,300	27.55%	30,128
Scioto	22,609	70.54%	9,080	28.33%	262	0.82%	91	0.28%	9	0.03%	13,529	42.21%	32,051
Seneca	17,086	66.10%	8,266	31.98%	357	1.38%	94	0.36%	45	0.17%	8,820	34.12%	25,848
Shelby	20,422	80.74%	4,465	17.65%	290	1.15%	71	0.28%	45	0.18%	15,957	63.09%	25,293
Stark	111,097	58.44%	75,904	39.93%	2,163	1.14%	683	0.36%	246	0.13%	35,193	18.51%	190,093
Summit	124,833	44.38%	151,668	53.92%	3,003	1.07%	888	0.32%	888	0.26%	−26,835	−9.54%	281,280
Trumbull	55,194	54.57%	44,519	44.01%	913	0.90%	356	0.35%	170	0.17%	10,675	10.56%	101,152
Tuscarawas	30,458	69.09%	12,889	29.24%	494	1.12%	161	0.37%	85	0.19%	17,569	39.85%	44,087
Union	21,669	64.62%	11,141	33.22%	535	1.60%	100	0.30%	90	0.27%	10,528	31.40%	33,535
Van Wert	11,650	77.70%	3,067	20.45%	201	1.34%	42	0.28%	34	0.23%	8,583	57.25%	14,994
Vinton	4,632	76.71%	1,331	22.04%	47	0.78%	17	0.28%	11	0.18%	3,301	54.67%	6,038
Warren	87,988	64.49%	46,069	33.76%	1,747	1.28%	0	0.00%	637	0.47%	41,919	30.73%	136,441
Washington	22,307	69.53%	9,243	28.81%	372	1.16%	109	0.34%	50	0.16%	13,064	40.72%	32,081
Wayne	36,759	67.72%	16,660	30.69%	665	1.23%	173	0.32%	26	0.05%	20,099	37.03%	54,283
Williams	13,452	72.12%	4,842	25.96%	285	1.53%	70	0.38%	2	0.01%	8,610	46.16%	18,651
Wood	35,757	52.89%	30,617	45.29%	992	1.47%	211	0.31%	23	0.03%	5,140	7.60%	67,600
Wyandot	8,462	74.21%	2,733	23.97%	155	1.36%	38	0.33%	15	0.13%	5,729	50.24%	11,403
Totals	3,154,834	53.18%	2,679,165	45.16%	67,569	1.14%	18,812	0.32%	12,018	0.20%	475,669	8.03%	5,932,398

Counties that flipped from Democratic to Republican

- Lorain (largest municipality: Lorain)
- Mahoning (largest municipality: Youngstown)

County that flipped from Republican to Democratic

- Montgomery (largest municipality: Dayton)

==== By congressional district ====
Trump won 12 out of the 16 congressional districts in Ohio.

District	Trump	Biden	Representative
1st	51%	48%	Steve Chabot
2nd	56%	43%	Brad Wenstrup
3rd	28%	70%	Joyce Beatty
4th	67%	31%	Jim Jordan
5th	62%	37%	Bob Latta
6th	72%	27%	Bill Johnson
7th	65%	33%	Bob Gibbs
8th	66%	33%	Warren Davidson
9th	40%	59%	Marcy Kaptur
10th	51%	47%	Mike Turner
11th	19%	80%	Marcia Fudge
12th	52%	46%	Troy Balderson
13th	48%	51%	Tim Ryan
14th	54%	45%	David Joyce
15th	56%	42%	Steve Stivers
16th	56%	42%	Anthony Gonzalez

== Analysis ==
Ohio was considered one of the most competitive states in the Midwest in the early 21st century. For example, it was a vital tipping-point state in the heavily contested 2004 election, and its projection in 2012 put Barack Obama over the top in the Electoral College. After Trump won Ohio in 2016 by an unexpectedly large margin of 8 points, it was initially considered out of reach for Democrats. However, Democrats contested it after polling pointed to a possibly close result in 2020.

From 1964 through 2016, Ohio had been a reliable bellwether, voting for the winner of every presidential election. In 2016, however, it voted over ten points to the right of the nation as a whole, indicating that it might be on the cusp of losing its bellwether status. And indeed, in 2020, Ohio backed the losing nominee for the first time since it backed Richard Nixon in 1960, and in doing so, it voted over ten points to the right of the nation overall for the second time in a row, giving Trump a comfortable eight-point margin even as he lost nationally. This indicated that Ohio is likely following a similar path to that of Missouri, another former bellwether state in the Midwest that has more recently become reliably red. (Missouri voted for the winning candidate in every election from 1904 to 2004 except for 1956. In 2008, Missouri narrowly backed Republican John McCain despite the fact that he lost the election by a wide margin nationally, and in every election since it has voted Republican by a comfortable margin.) In this election, Ohio weighed in at 12.5% more Republican than the nation as a whole, even voting more Republican than Texas, a Southern state that has been a GOP stronghold for four decades.

While Biden outperformed Hillary Clinton in the Midwest at large, Trump managed to flip two Ohio counties Republican: Lorain, a suburban county of Cleveland, and Mahoning, anchored by the car-making town of Youngstown. Trump became the first Republican presidential candidate to win Lorain County since Ronald Reagan in 1984, and the first to win Mahoning County since Richard Nixon in 1972. Biden became the first Democrat since FDR in 1932 to win the White House without carrying Mahoning County and Trumbull County, and the first Democrat since Harry Truman in 1948 to win the White House without carrying Lorain County. On the other hand, Biden flipped back Montgomery County, home to Dayton, into the Democratic column, a county which Trump had flipped in 2016. He also came within 7 points of flipping suburban Delaware County in the Columbus area, the closest a Democrat has come to flipping it since 1964.

Biden's results were an all time-best for Democrats in two counties - Franklin, home to the state capital of Columbus, where he received 64.68% of the vote and beat Trump by 31 points, and Hamilton, home to Cincinnati, where he received 57.15% of the vote and beat Trump by 16 points—even greater than Franklin D. Roosevelt's and Lyndon B. Johnson's landslides. Biden's Delaware County result of 45.69% was a 56-year best, and in Warren County of suburban Cincinnati, his result was a 44-year best. He also outperformed Obama's 2012 results in Butler (Cincinnati suburbs) and Greene (Dayton suburbs) counties.

However, in all other counties, Biden underperformed Barack Obama's 2008 and 2012 results and occasionally also John Kerry's 2004 results. For example, in Athens County, home to Ohio University, which has been one of the Democrats' strongest counties that Obama won by 35 points in both 2008 and 2012, Biden improved Clinton's result by 1.5 percent, but Trump reduced his 2016 losing margin from 17 points to 15 points and managed to win 40% of the county's vote, the first Republican to do so since George H. W. Bush in 1988. Biden underperformed Clinton in the Northeast and Lake Erie area, also in the most populous counties - in addition to losing Mahoning and Lorain counties, although in Cuyahoga County, home to Cleveland, he improved Clinton's 2016 result by 1 point, his 34-point winning margin was one point worse than Clinton's, six points down from Obama's 2012 40-point and only 0.36 percent better than Kerry's in 2004. In Lucas County, home to Toledo, he improved Clinton's result by 1.5 percent, but at a 1 percent worse margin at 16.73%, a 32-year low for Democrats after Michael Dukakis won it by under 9 points in 1988. While in Summit County, home to Akron, he improved on Clinton's result by 2.35 percent and the margin by 1 percent, at 9.5 percent it was still a far cry from Obama's 17-percent margin in 2008, and second-worst for Democrats since 1988. In Stark County, home to Canton, he improved on Clinton's result by 1.25 percent, but his 1.35% worse losing margin of 18.51 percent was a 36-year low for Democrats, after Walter Mondale lost it by 20.18 percent in 1984.

This was the first presidential election in which a candidate received more than 3 million votes in Ohio. Ohio is one of three states, the others being Iowa and Florida, that voted twice for Barack Obama and thrice for Donald Trump. This ended Ohio's 14-election bellwether streak from 1964 to 2016.

=== Mahoning County ===
Trump: 40–50% 50–60% 60–70% 70–80% 80–90% / Biden: 40–50% 60–70% 70–80% 80–90% ≥90%

Mahoning County, anchored by the car-making town of Youngstown, voted Republican for the first time since Richard Nixon's landslide re-election in 1972. The slim victory by Trump marked a collapse in Democrats' support among white working-class voters, and tightened the President's grip on blue-collar white voters.

David Betras, who was Democratic chairman of Mahoning County until 2019, speculated on the disconnect between Democrats in Washington who focused messaging Trump's unfitness for office, his taxes and possible impeachment, and the concerns of blue-collar workers were supporting Trump for his trade war with China, regardless of economic pain caused by tariffs.

=== Voter demographics ===
Edison Research exit poll
Demographic subgroup	Biden	Trump	No Answer	% of Voters
Party
Democrat	92	7	1	31
Republican	7	93	N/A	39
Independent	48	48	4	30
Gender
Men	39	59	2	47
Women	51	48	1	53
Race
White	39	60	1	84
Black	91	8	1	11
Latino	57	39	4	3
Asian	N/A	N/A	N/A	1
Other	48	51	1	2
Gender by race/ethnicity
White men	33	65	2	40
White women	44	55	1	44
Black men	86	11	3	4
Black women	93	6	1	7
Latino men (of any race)	N/A	N/A	N/A	1
Latino women (of any race)	60	39	1	2
All other races	50	49	1	2
Age
18–24 years old	55	42	3	9
25–29 years old	60	33	7	6
30–39 years old	53	44	3	15
40–49 years old	47	52	1	16
50–64 years old	42	58	N/A	29
65 and older	37	62	1	23
Sexual orientation
LGBT	82	15	3	6
Heterosexual	42	57	1	94
First time voter
First time voter	45	53	2	9
Everyone else	45	54	1	91
Education
High school or less	35	64	1	23
Some college education	42	56	2	28
Associate degree	44	54	2	15
Bachelor's degree	50	48	2	21
Advanced degree	62	36	2	14
Education by race/ethnicity
White college graduates	52	46	2	30
White no college degree	31	67	2	53
Non-white college graduates	78	21	1	4
Non-white no college degree	79	19	1	12
Income
Under $30,000	53	46	1	15
$30,000–49,999	52	46	2	20
$50,000–99,999	43	55	2	34
$100,000–199,999	41	58	1	25
Over $200,000	47	50	3	7
Abortion should be
Legal in all cases	79	17	4	21
Legal in most cases	65	34	1	30
Illegal in most cases	13	86	1	30
Illegal in all cases	10	89	1	14
Region
Cleveland Area	60	39	1	15
North	45	53	2	25
West	26	72	2	11
Columbus Area	54	45	1	18
Cincinnati/Dayton Area	47	52	1	21
Ohio Valley	28	71	1	11
Source: CNN

== See also ==
- United States presidential elections in Ohio
- 2020 Ohio elections
- 2020 United States presidential election
- 2020 Democratic Party presidential primaries
- 2020 Republican Party presidential primaries
- 2020 United States elections

== Notes ==
Partisan clients
