= 2020 United States presidential election in North Carolina =

- November 3, 2020
- Turnout: 75.35% (▲6.37 pp)

| Nominee | Donald Trump | Joe Biden |
| Party | Republican | Democratic |
| Home state | Florida | Delaware |
| Running mate | Mike Pence | Kamala Harris |
| Electoral vote | 15 | 0 |
| Popular vote | 2,758,775 | 2,684,292 |
| Percentage | 49.93% | 48.59% |

Trump
40–50%
50–60%
60–70%
70–80%
80–90%
90–100%
Biden
40–50%
50–60%
60–70%
70–80%
80–90%
90–100%
Tie/No votes
President before election
Donald Trump
Republican
Elected President
Joe Biden
Democratic

The 2020 United States presidential election in North Carolina was held on Tuesday, November 3, 2020, as part of the 2020 United States presidential election in which all 50 states plus the District of Columbia participated. North Carolina voters chose electors to represent them in the Electoral College via a popular vote. The state was narrowly won by the Republican Party's nominee, incumbent President Donald Trump of Florida, and running mate Vice President Mike Pence of Indiana, against Democratic Party nominee, former Vice President Joe Biden of Delaware, and his running mate California Senator Kamala Harris. North Carolina had 15 electoral votes in the Electoral College.

Polls of the state throughout the campaign indicated a close race, with most organizations considering it either a tossup or leaning towards Biden. Despite this, Trump ultimately won North Carolina with a 49.93% plurality over Biden's 48.59% vote share (a margin of 1.34%). Trump thereby became the fourth-ever Republican to carry North Carolina without winning the presidency, after George H. W. Bush in 1992, Bob Dole in 1996, and Mitt Romney in 2012. This was Trump's narrowest victory in any state, and it was a closer result than his 3.67% margin over Hillary Clinton in 2016 or Mitt Romney's 2.04% margin over Barack Obama in 2012. North Carolina was the only state in the 2020 election in which Trump won with under 50% of the vote. (Note: There were three states in which Biden won with under 50% of the vote – Arizona, Georgia and Wisconsin.) In the 2020 election, North Carolina was 5.8% right of the nation as a whole. The state last voted Democratic in 2008 and had last voted more Republican than neighboring Georgia in 2000.

Trump's victory was, alongside his victory and actual improvement over 2016 in Florida, one of the upsets of the cycle. Election data website FiveThirtyEight's election forecast had Biden up in both states, albeit by small margins. Similarly, prediction websites Inside Elections, Sabato's Crystal Ball, The Economist, and ABC News all had Biden favored in the state.

== Primary elections ==
Presidential preference primaries were held on March 3, 2020 (first cases of COVID-19), for each of the political parties with state ballot access.

=== Democratic primary ===
Despite speculation that he might seek the Democratic nomination, Roy Cooper, the Governor of North Carolina, declined to run.

Popular vote share by county Biden—<30% Biden—30–40% Biden—40–50% Biden—50–60% Biden—60–70% Sanders—30–40% Sanders—40–50%

2020 North Carolina Democratic presidential primary
| Candidate | Votes | % | Delegates |
|---|---|---|---|
| Joe Biden | 572,271 | 42.95 | 68 |
| Bernie Sanders | 322,645 | 24.22 | 37 |
| Michael Bloomberg | 172,558 | 12.95 | 3 |
| Elizabeth Warren | 139,912 | 10.50 | 2 |
| Pete Buttigieg (withdrawn) (Note: Candidate withdrew during early voting, shortly before the date of the election.) | 43,632 | 3.27 | |
| Amy Klobuchar (withdrawn) | 30,742 | 2.31 | |
| Tom Steyer (withdrawn) | 10,679 | 0.80 | |
| Tulsi Gabbard | 6,622 | 0.50 | |
| Andrew Yang (withdrawn) | 2,973 | 0.22 | |
| Cory Booker (withdrawn) | 2,181 | 0.16 | |
| Michael Bennet (withdrawn) | 1,978 | 0.15 | |
| Deval Patrick (withdrawn) | 1,341 | 0.10 | |
| Marianne Williamson (withdrawn) | 1,243 | 0.09 | |
| John Delaney (withdrawn) | 1,098 | 0.08 | |
| Julian Castro (withdrawn) | 699 | 0.05 | |
| No Preference | 21,808 | 1.64 | |
| Total | 1,332,382 | 100% | 110 |

=== Republican primary ===
The North Carolina Republican Party submitted to the state only the name of incumbent President Donald Trump to be listed on the primary ballot. The campaign of Bill Weld "has written to the [state Board of Elections] asking to be added to the ballot, arguing that his candidacy meets the legal test because he’s received 'widespread news coverage,' raised more than $1.2 million, and has qualified for the primary ballot in six other states," according to The News & Observer. Joe Walsh similarly petitioned the state board of elections. On Dec. 20, 2019, the state board unanimously voted to include both Weld and Walsh on the ballot.

2020 North Carolina Republican presidential primary
| Candidate | Votes | % | Delegates |
|---|---|---|---|
| Donald Trump (incumbent) | 750,600 | 93.53 | 71 |
| Joe Walsh (withdrawn) | 16,356 | 2.04 | 0 |
| Bill Weld | 15,486 | 1.93 | 0 |
| No Preference | 20,085 | 2.50 | |
| Total | 802,527 | 100% | 71 |

=== Libertarian primary ===
2020 North Carolina Libertarian presidential primary
- March 3, 2020

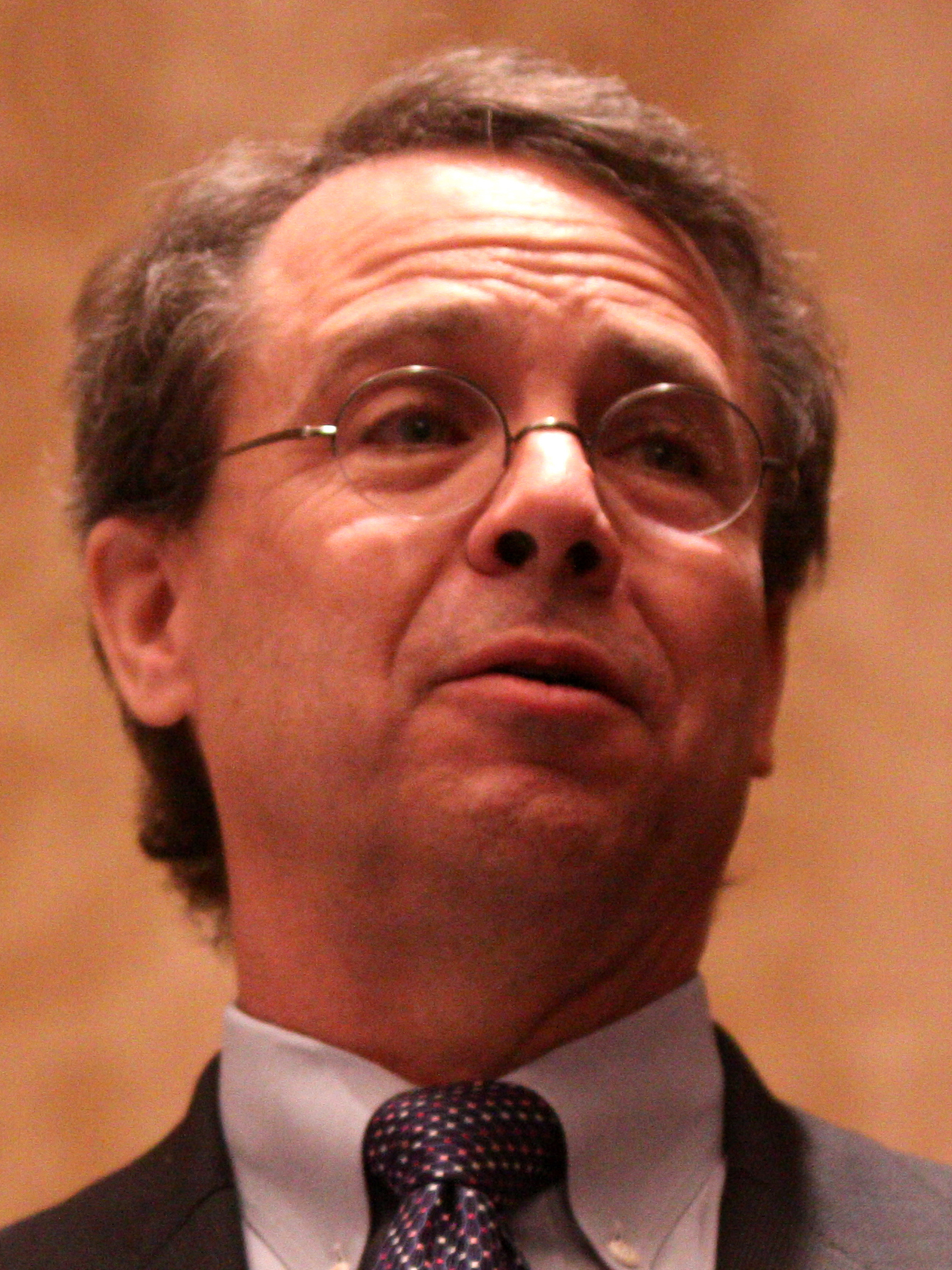

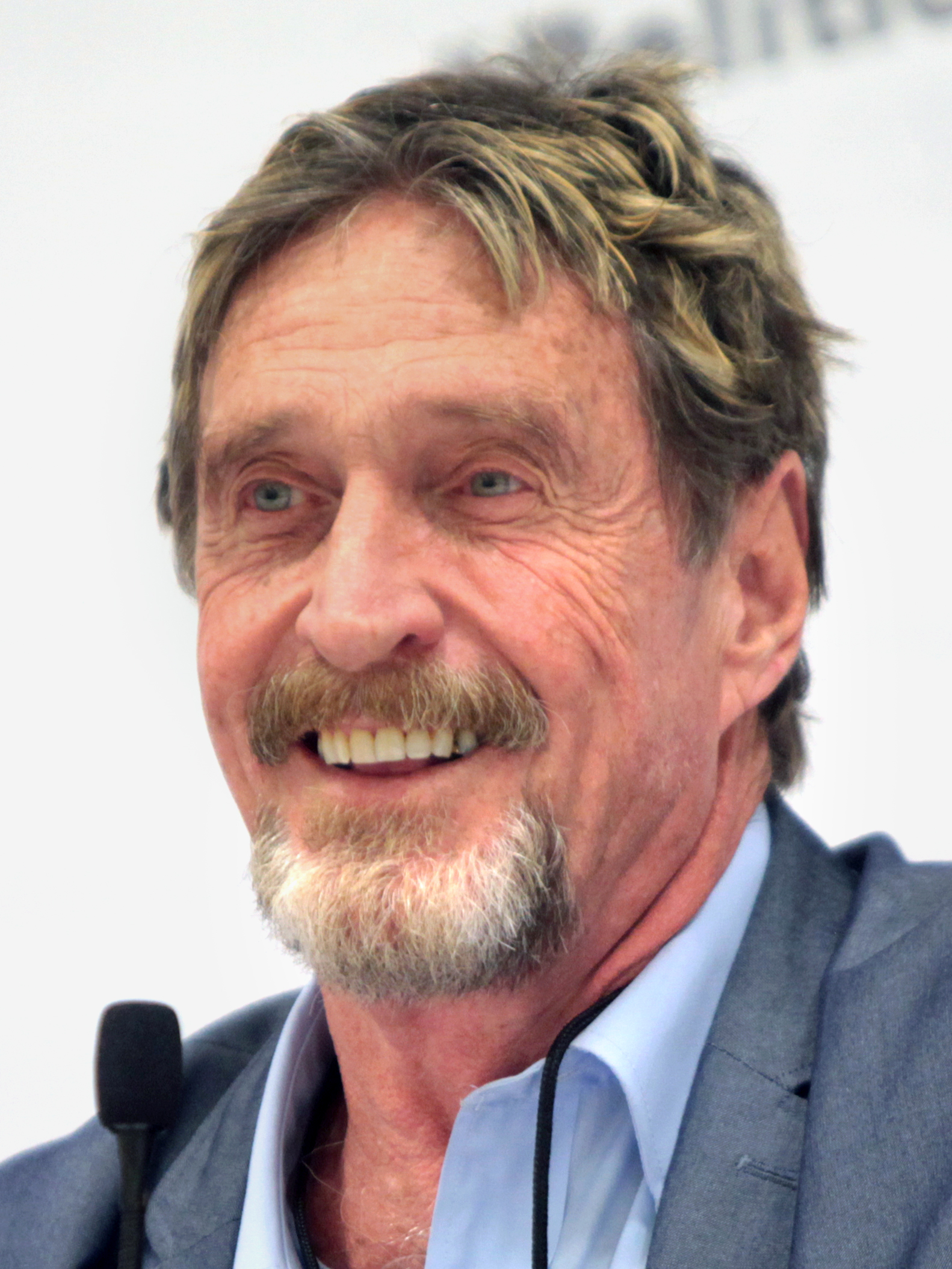

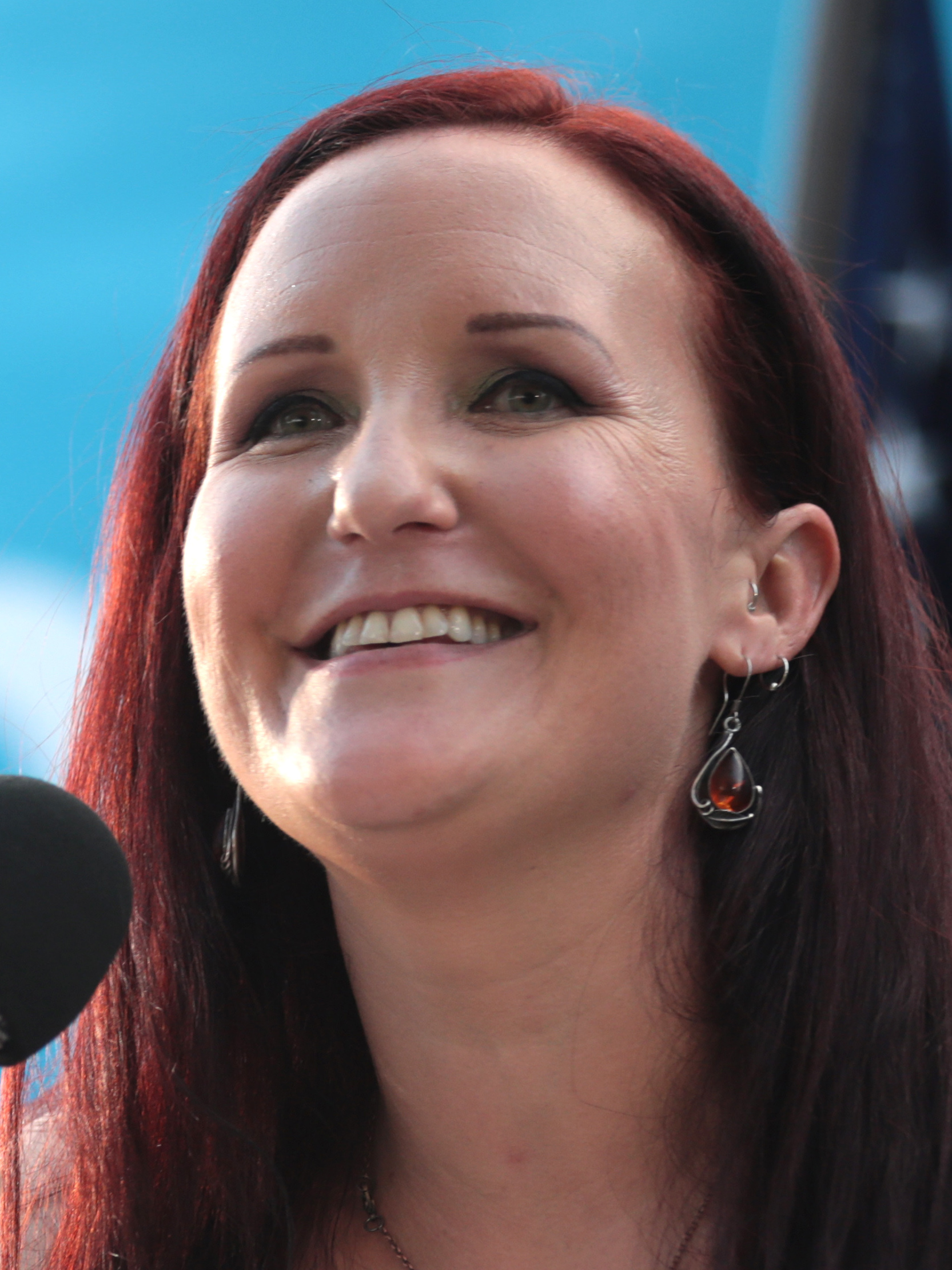

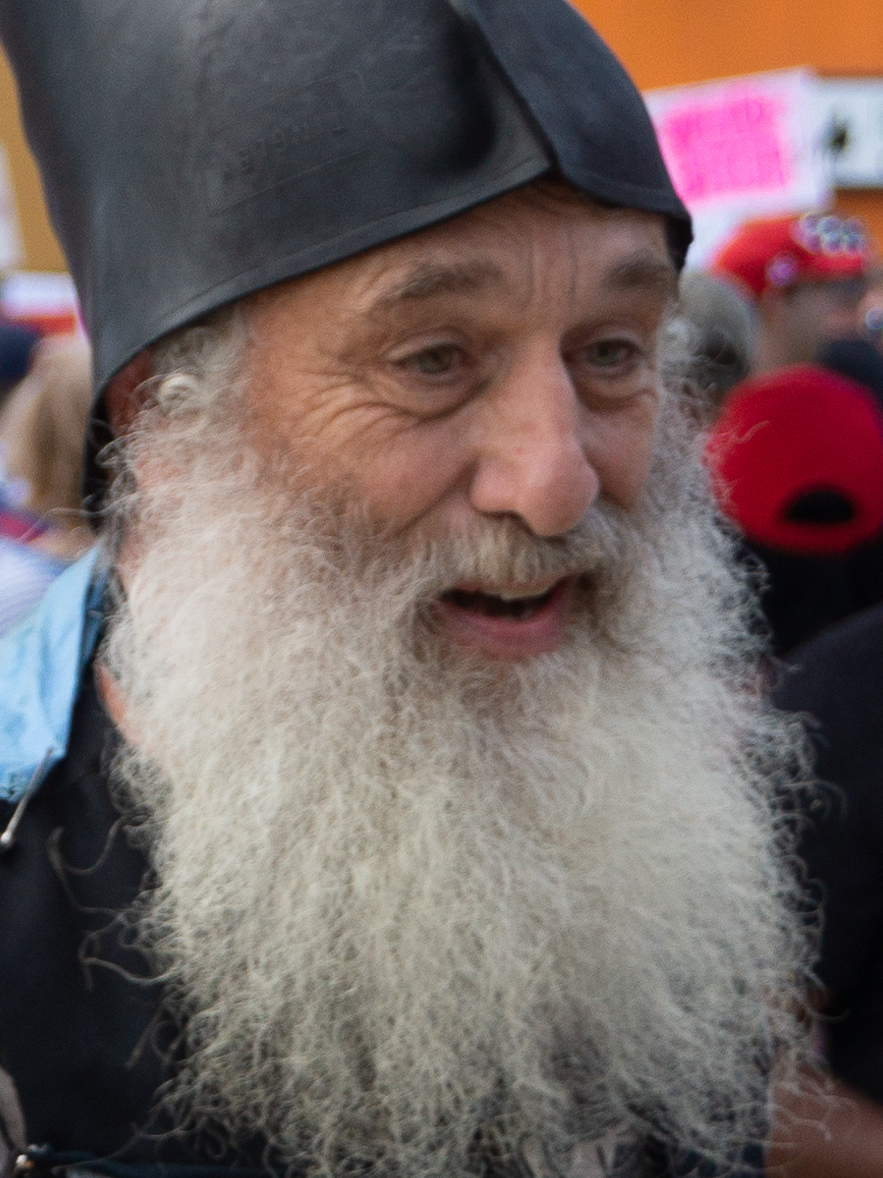

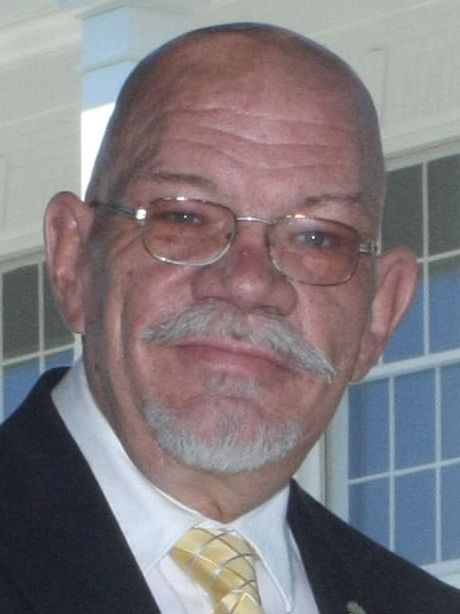
| Candidate | None of the above | Jacob Hornberger | John McAfee |
| Home state | N/A | Virginia | Tennessee |
| Popular vote | 2,060 | 604 | 570 |
| Percentage | 45.2% | 13.3% | 12.5% |
| Candidate | Kim Ruff (withdrawn) | Vermin Supreme | Ken Armstrong |
| Home state | Arizona | Massachusetts | Oregon |
| Popular vote | 545 | 410 | 366 |
| Percentage | 12% | 9% | 8% |
Election results by county
| None of the above Kim Ruff Vermin Supreme Ken Armstrong Jo Jorgensen | Steve Richey Dan Behrman Jedidiah Hill Tie No votes |

North Carolina Libertarian presidential primary, March 3, 2020
| Candidate | Votes | Percentage |
|---|---|---|
| None of the above | 2,060 | 30% |
| Jacob Hornberger | 604 | 9% |
| John McAfee | 570 | 8% |
| Kim Ruff (withdrawn) | 545 | 8% |
| Vermin Supreme | 410 | 6% |
| Ken Armstrong | 366 | 5% |
| Jo Jorgensen | 316 | 5% |
| Steve Richey | 278 | 4% |
| Adam Kokesh | 240 | 3% |
| Max Abramson | 236 | 3% |
| James Ogle | 232 | 3% |
| Kenneth Blevins | 199 | 3% |
| Dan Behrman | 194 | 3% |
| Jedidiah Hill | 194 | 3% |
| Souraya Faas | 193 | 3% |
| Erik Gerhardt | 150 | 2% |
| Arvin Vohra | 127 | 2% |
| Total | 6,914 | 100% |

=== Green primary ===
2020 North Carolina Green Party presidential primary
| Party | Candidate | Votes | % |
|---|---|---|---|
| Green | Howie Hawkins | 247 | 60.54% |
| Green | No Preference | 161 | 39.46% |
| Total votes | | 408 | 100% |

=== Constitution primary ===
2020 North Carolina Constitution Party presidential primary
| Party | Candidate | Votes | % |
|---|---|---|---|
| Constitution | No Preference | 193 | 44.57% |
| Constitution | Don Blankenship | 128 | 29.56% |
| Constitution | Charles Kraut | 112 | 25.87% |
| Total votes | | 438 | 100% |

== General election ==
=== Predictions ===
| Source | Ranking |
|---|---|
| The Cook Political Report | Tossup |
| Inside Elections | Tilt D (flip) |
| Sabato's Crystal Ball | Lean D (flip) |
| Politico | Tossup |
| RCP | Tossup |
| Niskanen | Tossup |
| CNN | Tossup |
| The Economist | Lean D (flip) |
| CBS News | Tossup |
| 270towin | Tossup |
| ABC News | Lean D (flip) |
| NPR | Tossup |
| NBC News | Tossup |
| FiveThirtyEight | Lean D (flip) |

=== Polling ===
View source data.

Aggregate polls

| Source of poll aggregation | Dates administered | Dates updated | Joe Biden Democratic | Donald Trump Republican | Other/ Undecided (Note: Calculated by taking the difference of 100% and all other candidates combined.) | Margin |
|---|---|---|---|---|---|---|
| 270 to Win | October 31 – November 2, 2020 | November 3, 2020 | 47.8% | 47.5% | 4.7% | Biden +0.3 |
| Real Clear Politics | October 26 – November 1, 2020 | November 3, 2020 | 47.6% | 47.8% | 4.6% | Trump +0.2 |
| FiveThirtyEight | until November 2, 2020 | November 3, 2020 | 48.9% | 47.1% | 4.0% | Biden +1.8 |
| Average | | | 48.1% | 47.5% | 4.4% | Biden +0.6 |

June 1 – October 31, 2020

| Poll source | Date(s) administered | Sample size (Note: Key: A – all adults RV – registered voters LV – likely voters V – unclear) | Margin of error | Donald Trump Republican | Joe Biden Democratic | Jo Jorgensen Libertarian | Howie Hawkins Green | Other | Undecided |
|---|---|---|---|---|---|---|---|---|---|
| SurveyMonkey/Axios | Oct 20 – Nov 2, 2020 | 5,363 (LV) | ± 2% | 48% (Note: Overlapping sample with the previous SurveyMonkey/Axios poll, but more information available regarding sample size) | 50% | - | - | – | – |
| Change Research/CNBC | Oct 29 – Nov 1, 2020 | 473 (LV) | ± 4.51% | 47% | 49% | 2% | 1% | – | 1% |
| Swayable | Oct 27 – Nov 1, 2020 | 690 (LV) | ± 5.3% | 46% | 52% | 1% | 0% | – | – |
| Ipsos/Reuters | Oct 27 – Nov 1, 2020 | 707 (LV) | ± 4.2% | 48% (Note: Standard VI response) | 49% | 1% | 1% | 2% (Note: "Some other candidate" and West (B) with 1%; would not vote with 0%) | – |
| Ipsos/Reuters | Oct 27 – Nov 1, 2020 | 707 (LV) | ± 4.2% | 48% (Note: If only Biden, Trump and "some other candidate" were available) | 49% | - | - | 3% (Note: "Some other candidate" with 3%; would not vote with 0%) | 1% |
| Ipsos/Reuters | Oct 27 – Nov 1, 2020 | 707 (LV) | ± 4.2% | 48% (Note: Results considering those who lean towards a given candidate among those initially predisposed towards abstention, indecision or a candidate besides Biden or Trump in the response section immediately above) | 50% | - | - | 2% (Note: "Some other candidate" with 2%) | – |
| Data for Progress | Oct 27 – Nov 1, 2020 | 908 (LV) | ± 3.3% | 48% | 50% | 1% | 1% | 0% (Note: "Other candidate or write-in" with 0%) | – |
| Frederick Polls/Compete Everywhere (Note: Compete Everywhere primarily supports Democratic candidates) | Oct 30–31, 2020 | 676 (LV) | ± 3.7% | 49% | 51% | - | - | – | – |
| AtlasIntel | Oct 30–31, 2020 | 812 (LV) | ± 3.0% | 50% | 48% | - | - | 3% | – |
| Insider Advantage/Center for American Greatness (Note: The Center for American Greatness is a pro-Trump organization) | Oct 30–31, 2020 | 450 (LV) | ± 4.6% | 48% | 44% | 2% | - | – | 7% |
| Emerson College | Oct 29–31, 2020 | 855 (LV) | ± 3.3% | 47% (Note: With voters who lean towards a given candidate) | 47% | - | - | 6% (Note: "Someone else" with 6%) | – |
| Morning Consult | Oct 22–31, 2020 | 1,982 (LV) | ± 2% | 48% | 49% | - | - | – | – |
| CNN/SSRS | Oct 23–30, 2020 | 901 (LV) | ± 4.1% | 45% | 51% | 2% | 1% | 1% (Note: "None of these" with 1%; "Other" with 0%) | 1% |
| Pulse Opinion Research/Rasmussen Reports | Oct 28–29, 2020 | 800 (LV) | ± 3.5% | 48% | 47% | - | - | 2% | – |
| Trafalgar Group | Oct 27–29, 2020 | 1,082 (LV) | ± 2.9% | 49% | 47% | 3% | - | 1% (Note: "Someone else" with 1%) | 1% |
| Redfield & Wilton Strategies | Oct 26–29, 2020 | 1,489 (LV) | – | 47% | 49% | 2% | 0% | 0% | 2% |
| Harvard-Harris/The Hill | Oct 26–29, 2020 | 903 (LV) | – | 48% | 49% | - | - | – | 3% |
| East Carolina University | Oct 27–28, 2020 | 1,103 (LV) | ± 3.4% | 48% | 50% | - | - | 2% (Note: "Some other candidate" with 2%; did/would not vote and "Refused" with 0%) | 0% (Note: No voters) |
| Cardinal Point Analytics (R)/NSJ | Oct 27–28, 2020 | 750 (LV) | ± 3.6% | 48% | 46% | 1% | 1% | 2% (Note: Blankenship (C) with 2%) | 2% |
| Marist College/NBC | Oct 25–28, 2020 | 800 (LV) | ± 4.7% | 46% | 52% | - | - | 2% | 1% |
| SurveyMonkey/Axios | Oct 1–28, 2020 | 8,720 (LV) | – | 47% | 52% | - | - | – | – |
| Gravis Marketing | Oct 26–27, 2020 | 614 (LV) | ± 4% | 46% | 49% | - | - | – | 4% |
| Public Policy Polling/Protect Our Care (Note: Poll sponsored by Protect Our Care, a pro-Affordable Care Act organization) | Oct 26–27, 2020 | 937 (V) | ± 3.2% | 47% | 51% | - | - | – | 3% |
| Meeting Street Insights/Carolina Partnership for Reform (R) | Oct 24–27, 2020 | 600 (LV) | ± 4% | 45% | 48% | - | - | – | – |
| Siena College/NYT Upshot | Oct 23–27, 2020 | 1,034 (LV) | ± 3.4% | 45% | 48% | 2% | 1% | 0% (Note: "Someone else" and would not vote with 0%) | 4% (Note: Includes "Refused") |
| Ipsos/Reuters | Oct 21–27, 2020 | 647 (LV) | ± 4.4% | 48% | 49% | 1% | 1% | 1% (Note: "Some other candidate" with 1%; West (B) and would not vote with 0%) | – |
| Ipsos/Reuters | Oct 21–27, 2020 | 647 (LV) | ± 4.4% | 48% | 49% | - | - | 2% (Note: "Some other candidate" with 2%; would not vote with 0%) | 1% |
| RMG Research/PoliticalIQ | Oct 24–26, 2020 | 800 (LV) | ± 3.5% | 47% | 48% | - | - | 3% (Note: "Another candidate" with 3%) | 2% |
| RMG Research/PoliticalIQ | Oct 24–26, 2020 | 800 (LV) | ± 3.5% | 46% (Note: Results generated with high Democratic turnout model) | 50% | - | - | 3% | 2% |
| RMG Research/PoliticalIQ | Oct 24–26, 2020 | 800 (LV) | ± 3.5% | 49% (Note: Results generated with high Republican turnout model) | 47% | - | - | 3% | 2% |
| Swayable | Oct 23–26, 2020 | 396 (LV) | ± 6.8% | 48% | 50% | 2% | 0% | – | – |
| SurveyUSA/WRAL-TV | Oct 23–26, 2020 | 627 (LV) | ± 4.9% | 48% | 48% | - | - | 2% | 2% |
| YouGov/UMass Amherst | Oct 20–26, 2020 | 911 (LV) | ± 4.2% | 48% | 48% | 1% | 0% | 1% (Note: "Another candidate" with 1%) | 2% |
| Wick Surveys | Oct 24–25, 2020 | 1,000 (LV) | ± 3.1% | 49% | 47% | - | - | – | – |
| Harper Polling/Harper Polling/Civitas (R) | Oct 22–25, 2020 | 504 (LV) | ± 4.37% | 46% | 47% | 1% | 0% | 0% (Note: Blankenship (C) with no voters) | 6% |
| YouGov/CBS | Oct 20–23, 2020 | 1,022 (LV) | ± 4.1% | 47% | 51% | – | – | 2% (Note: "Other third party" with 2%) | 0% |
| Trafalgar Group | Oct 20–22, 2020 | 1,098 (LV) | ± 2.9% | 48.8% | 46% | 2.3% | 0.4% | 0.8% (Note: "Someone else" with 0.6%; Blankenship (C) with 0.2%) | 1.7% |
| Citizen Data | Oct 17–20, 2020 | 1000 (LV) | ± 3.1% | 44% | 50% | 1% | 0.2% | 1.3% | 3.6% |
| Pulse Opinion Research/Rasmussen Reports | Oct 20–21, 2020 | 800 (LV) | ± 3.5% | 48% | 47% | - | - | 2% | 3% |
| Ipsos/Reuters | Oct 14–20, 2020 | 660 (LV) | ± 4.3% | 47% | 49% | 1% | 1% | 1% | – |
| Ipsos/Reuters | Oct 14–20, 2020 | 660 (LV) | ± 4.3% | 46% | 49% | - | - | 2% | 2% |
| Morning Consult | Oct 11–20, 2020 | 1,904 (LV) | ± 2.2% | 47% | 50% | - | - | – | – |
| Meredith College | Oct 16–19, 2020 | 732 (LV) | ± 3.5% | 44% | 48% | 1% | 1% | 0% (Note: Blankenship (C) with 0%) | 4% |
| Change Research/CNBC | Oct 16–19, 2020 | 521 (LV) (Note: Additional data sourced from FiveThirtyEight) | – | 47% | 50% | - | - | – | – |
| Data for Progress (D) | Oct 15–18, 2020 | 929 (LV) | ± 3.2% | 44% | 48% | 1% | 1% | – | 5% |
| East Carolina University | Oct 15–18, 2020 | 1,155 (LV) | ± 3.4% | 47% | 51% | - | - | 2% (Note: "Some other candidate" with 1%; did/would not vote and "Refused" with 0%) | 0% |
| ABC/Washington Post | Oct 12–17, 2020 | 646 (LV) | ± 4.5% | 48% | 49% | 1% | 0% | 0% (Note: "Other", "None of these" and would not vote with 0%) | 1% |
| ABC/Washington Post | Oct 12–17, 2020 | 646 (LV) | ± 4.5% | 48% (Note: If only Biden and Trump were candidates) | 50% | - | - | 0% | 1% |
| Emerson College | Oct 11–14, 2020 | 721 (LV) | ± 3.6% | 49% | 49% | - | - | 2% (Note: "Someone else" with 2%) | – |
| Civiqs/Daily Kos | Oct 11–14, 2020 | 1,211 (LV) | ± 3.3% | 46% | 51% | - | - | 2% | 1% |
| Redfield & Wilton Strategies | Oct 10–13, 2020 | 994 (LV) | – | 46% | 49% | 1% | 0% | – | – |
| Siena College/NYT Upshot | Oct 9–13, 2020 | 627 (LV) | ± 4.5% | 42% | 46% | 2% | 1% | 1% (Note: "Someone else" with 1%; would not vote with 0%) | 8% |
| Ipsos/Reuters | Oct 7–13, 2020 | 660 (LV) | ± 4.3% | 48% | 48% | 2% | 0% | 1% | – |
| Ipsos/Reuters | Oct 7–13, 2020 | 660 (LV) | ± 4.3% | 47% | 48% | - | - | 3% | 3% |
| Monmouth University | Oct 8–11, 2020 | 500 (RV) | ± 4.4% | 46% | 49% | 3% | 0% | 0% (Note: Blankenship (C), "No one" and "Other candidate" with no voters) | 2% |
| Monmouth University | Oct 8–11, 2020 | 500 (LV) (Note: With a likely voter turnout model featuring high turnout) | ± 4.4% | 46% | 50% | - | - | 2% | 2% |
| Monmouth University | Oct 8–11, 2020 | 500 (LV) (Note: With a likely voter turnout model featuring low turnout) | ± 4.4% | 48% | 49% | - | - | 2% | 1% |
| SurveyUSA/WRAL-TV | Oct 8–11, 2020 | 669 (LV) | ± 4.8% | 45% | 50% | - | - | 2% | 3% |
| Susquehanna Polling & Research Inc./American Greatness PAC | Oct 7–11, 2020 | 500 (LV) | ± 4.3% | 46% | 48% | 2% | - | 1% (Note: "Refused" with 1%; "Other" with 0%) | 4% |
| RMG Research/PoliticalIQ | Oct 7–11, 2020 | 800 (LV) | – | 45% | 47% | 2% | 1% | 1% | 4% |
| RMG Research/PoliticalIQ | Oct 7–11, 2020 | 800 (LV) | – | 43% | 49% | 2% | 1% | 1% | 4% |
| RMG Research/PoliticalIQ | Oct 7–11, 2020 | 800 (LV) | – | 47% | 44% | 2% | 1% | 1% | 4% |
| Morning Consult | Oct 2–11, 2020 | 1,993 (LV) | ± 2.2% | 46% | 50% | - | - | – | – |
| YouGov/CCES | Sep 29 – Oct 7, 2020 | 1,627 (LV) | – | 45% | 49% | - | - | – | – |
| Redfield & Wilton Strategies | Oct 9–10, 2020 | 750 (LV) | – | 42% | 49% | 1% | 0% | – | – |
| Redfield & Wilton Strategies | Oct 4–6, 2020 | 938 (LV) | ± 3.2% | 44% | 49% | 1% | 0% | 0% (Note: "Another Third Party/Write-in" with 0%) | 5% |
| Ipsos/Reuters | Sep 29 – Oct 6, 2020 | 693 (LV) | ± 4.2% | 47% | 47% | - | - | 2% | 3% |
| Public Policy Polling | Oct 4–5, 2020 | 911 (V) | – | 46% | 50% | - | - | – | 3% |
| Data For Progress (D) | Sep 30 – Oct 5, 2020 | 1,285 (LV) | ± 2.7% | 44% | 51% | 2% | 0% | – | 3% |
| Change Research/CNBC | Oct 2–4, 2020 | 396 (LV) | – | 47% | 49% | - | - | – | – |
| East Carolina University | Oct 2–4, 2020 | 1,232 (LV) | ± 3.2% | 46% | 50% | - | - | 2% (Note: "Some other candidate" with 2%; would not vote with no voters) | 2% |
| SurveyMonkey/Axios | Sep 1–30, 2020 | 3,495 (LV) | – | 46% | 52% | - | - | – | 2% |
| ALG Research/Piedmont Rising (Note: Piedmont Rising is a pro-Affordable Care Act organization) | Sep 22–28, 2020 | 822 (V) | – | 47% | 50% | - | - | – | – |
| Hart Research Associates/Human Rights Campaign (Note: The Human Rights Campaign endorsed Biden prior to this poll's sampling period) | Sep 24–27, 2020 | 400 (LV) | ± 4.9% | 47% | 49% | - | - | – | – |
| Redfield & Wilton Strategies | Sep 23–26, 2020 | 1,097 (LV) | ± 2.96% | 45% | 47% | 2% | 0% | 1% (Note: "Another Third Party/Write-in" with 1%) | 6% |
| YouGov/CBS | Sep 22–25, 2020 | 1,213 (LV) | ± 3.6% | 46% | 48% | - | - | 2% (Note: "Someone else/third party" with 2%) | 4% |
| YouGov/UMass Lowell | Sep 18–25, 2020 | 921 (LV) | ± 4.1% | 47% | 47% | 2% | 1% | 0% (Note: "Another candidate" with 0%) | 2% |
| YouGov/UMass Lowell | Sep 18–25, 2020 | 921 (LV) | ± 4.1% | 49% (Note: With only Biden, Trump and "another candidate" as options) | 48% | - | - | 2% (Note: "Another candidate" with 2%) | 2% |
| Meredith College | Sep 18–22, 2020 | 705 (RV) | ± 3.5% | 45% | 46% | 2% | 0% | 1% (Note: Blankenship (C) with 1%) | 6% |
| Change Research/CNBC | Sep 18–20, 2020 | 579 (LV) | – | 46% | 48% | - | - | – | – |
| Harper Polling/Harper Polling/Civitas (R) | Sep 17–20, 2020 | 612 (LV) | ± 3.96% | 45% | 44% | 2% | 0% | 0% | 8% |
| Emerson College | Sep 16–18, 2020 | 717 (LV) | ± 3.6% | 49% | 51% | - | - | – | – |
| Siena College/NYT Upshot | Sep 11–16, 2020 | 653 (LV) | ± 4.3% | 44% | 45% | 2% | 1% | 0% | 8% |
| Ipsos/Reuters | Sep 11–16, 2020 | 586 (LV) | ± 4.6% | 47% | 47% | - | - | 3% | 3% |
| Redfield & Wilton Strategies | Sep 12–15, 2020 | 1,092 (LV) | ± 2.97% | 45% | 47% | 1% | 1% | 0% | 5% |
| Suffolk University/USA Today | Sep 11–14, 2020 | 500 (LV) | – | 42.8% | 46.2% | 4.8% | 0.2% | 1.8% (Note: "Refused" with 1.4%; "Other" with 0.4%; Blankenship (C) with no voters) | 4.2% |
| SurveyUSA/WRAL TV | Sep 10–13, 2020 | 596 (LV) | ± 5.6% | 47% | 47% | - | - | 2% | 5% |
| CNN/SSRS | Sep 9–13, 2020 | 787 (LV) | ± 3.9% | 46% | 49% | 2% | 1% | 0% (Note: "None of these" and "Other" with 0%; Blankenship (C) with no voters) | 2% |
| Kaiser Family Foundation/Cook Political Report | Aug 29 – Sep 13, 2020 | 1,172 (RV) | ± 3% | 43% | 45% | - | - | 4% (Note: "Someone else" with 3%; would not vote with 1%; "refused" with 0%) | 9% |
| Trafalgar | Sep 9–11, 2020 | 1,046 (LV) | ± 3% | 47.8% | 46.1% | 1.6% | 0.5% | 1.5% (Note: "Someone else" with 1%; Blankenship (C) with 0.5%) | 2.5% |
| Pulse Opinion Research/Rasmussen Reports | Sep 7–8, 2020 | 1,000 (LV) | ± 3% | 49% | 48% | - | - | 3% (Note: "Some other candidate" with 3%) | – |
| Benenson Strategy Group/GS Group/AARP | Aug 28 – Sep 8, 2020 | 1,600 (LV) | ± 2.5% | 48% | 48% | - | - | 1% (Note: Would not vote with 1%) | 4% |
| Morning Consult | Aug 29 – Sep 7, 2020 | 1,592 (LV) | ± (2%-4%) | 47% (Note: Overlapping sample with the previous Morning Consult poll, but more information available regarding sample size) | 48% | - | - | – | – |
| Change Research/CNBC | Sep 4–6, 2020 | 442 (LV) | – | 47% | 49% | - | - | 4% (Note: "Other/not sure" with 4%) | – |
| Redfield & Wilton Strategies | Aug 30 – Sep 3, 2020 | 951 (LV) | ± 3.18% | 44% | 43% | 1% | 1% | 1% | 9% |
| Monmouth University | Aug 29 – Sep 1, 2020 | 401 (RV) | ± 4.9% | 45% | 47% | 3% | 0% | 1% (Note: "No one" with 1%; Blankenship and "Other candidate" with <1%) | 3% |
| Monmouth University | Aug 29 – Sep 1, 2020 | 401 (LV) (Note: With a likely voter turnout model featuring higher turnout than in the 2016 presidential election) | ± 4.9% | 46% | 48% | - | - | 3% | 3% |
| Monmouth University | Aug 29 – Sep 1, 2020 | 401 (LV) (Note: With a likely voter turnout model featuring lower turnout than in the 2016 presidential election) | ± 4.9% | 46% | 48% | - | - | 3% | 3% |
| Fox News | Aug 29 – Sep 1, 2020 | 722 (LV) | ± 3.5% | 46% | 50% | 1% | 0% | 0% (Note: Blankenship (C) and "Other" with 0%) | 2% |
| Fox News | Aug 29 – Sep 1, 2020 | 804 (RV) | ± 3.5% | 45% | 49% | 2% | 1% | 2% (Note: Blankenship (C) and would not vote with 1%; "Other" with 0%) | 3% |
| SurveyMonkey/Axios | Aug 1–31, 2020 | 2,914 (LV) | – | 51% | 48% | - | - | – | 2% |
| East Carolina University | Aug 29–30, 2020 | 1,101 (LV) | ± 3.4% | 49% | 47% | - | - | 2% | 3% |
| Morning Consult | Aug 21–30, 2020 | 1,567 (LV) | ± (2%–4%) | 47% | 49% | - | - | – | – |
| Change Research/CNBC | Aug 21–23, 2020 | 560 (LV) | – | 47% | 48% | – | – | – | – |
| Morning Consult | Aug 14–23, 2020 | 1,541 (LV) | ± 2.0% | 46% | 49% | – | – | 1% | 3% |
| Redfield & Wilton Strategies | Aug 16–17, 2020 | 967 (LV) | ± 3.09% | 46% | 44% | 2% | 0% | 1% | 7% |
| Morning Consult | Aug 7–16, 2020 | 1,493 (LV) | ± (2%–4%) | 46% | 49% | - | - | – | – |
| East Carolina University | Aug 12–13, 2020 | 1,255 (RV) | ± 3.2% | 47% | 47% | – | – | 3% (Note: "Other candidate" with 3%) | 4% |
| Emerson College | Aug 8–10, 2020 | 673 (LV) | ± 3.8% | 51% (Note: Including voters who lean towards a given candidate) | 49% | – | – | – | – |
| Harper Polling/Civitas | Aug 6–10, 2020 | 600 (LV) | ± 4.0% | 44% | 45% | 2% | 1% | 1% | 7% |
| Change Research/CNBC | Aug 7–9, 2020 | 493 (LV) | – | 48% | 47% | – | – | – | – |
| Pulse Opinion Research/Rasmussen Reports/American Greatness PAC | Aug 6–8, 2020 | 750 (LV) | ± 3.6% | 48% | 47% | – | – | – | – |
| Data for Progress | Jul 24 – Aug 2, 2020 | 1,170 (LV) | – | 45% | 49% | – | – | – | 6% |
| Data for Progress | Jul 24 – Aug 2, 2020 | 1,170 (LV) | – | 44% | 46% | 2% | 1% | – | 7% |
| Public Policy Polling/Giffords (Note: The founder of this poll's sponsor had endorsed Biden prior to the sampling period) | Jul 30–31, 2020 | 934 (V) | – | 46% | 49% | – | – | – | 6% |
| YouGov/CBS | Jul 28–31, 2020 | 1,129 (LV) | ± 3.9% | 44% | 48% | – | – | 2% (Note: "Someone else/third party" with 2%; would not vote with 0%) | 5% |
| HIT Strategies/DFER (Note: This poll’s sponsor, DFER, primarily supports Democratic candidates) | Jul 23–31, 2020 | 400 (RV) | ± 4.9% | 37% | 47% | – | – | 4% (Note: "Third party candidate" with 3%; would not vote with 1%) | 10% |
| SurveyMonkey/Axios | Jul 1–31, 2020 | 3,466 (LV) | – | 50% | 49% | - | - | – | 2% |
| Change Research/CNBC | Jul 24–26, 2020 | 284 (LV) | – | 46% | 49% | – | – | – | – |
| Morning Consult | Jul 17–26, 2020 | 1,504 (LV) | ± 2.5% | 47% | 47% | – | – | – | – |
| Public Policy Polling/AFSCME (Note: AFSCME endorsed Biden prior to this poll's sampling period) | Jul 23–24, 2020 | 884 (V) | – | 46% | 49% | – | – | – | 5% |
| Cardinal Point Analytics | Jul 22–24, 2020 | 735 (LV) | ± 3.6% | 48% | 47% | 1% | – | – | 4% |
| Zogby Analytics | Jul 21–23, 2020 | 809 (RV) | ± 3.4% | 40% | 44% | 4% | 1% | – | 11% |
| Marist College/NBC News | Jul 14–22, 2020 | 882 (RV) | ± 4.0% | 44% | 51% | – | – | 2% | 4% |
| Redfield & Wilton Strategies | Jul 19–21, 2020 | 919 (LV) | – | 42% | 43% | 2% | 1% | 1% | 11% |
| Spry Strategies/American Principles Project (Note: This poll's sponsor is the American Principles Project, a 501(c)(4) organization that supports the Republican Party.) | Jul 11–16, 2020 | 600 (LV) | ± 3.7% | 49% | 46% | – | – | – | 5% |
| Cardinal Point Analytics | Jul 13–15, 2020 | 547 (LV) | ± 4.2% | 49% | 48% | 1% | – | – | 3% |
| Change Research/CNBC | Jul 10–12, 2020 | 655 (LV) | – | 46% | 47% | – | – | – | – |
| Public Policy Polling | Jul 7–8, 2020 | 818 (V) | ± 3.4% | 46% | 50% | – | – | – | 5% |
| SurveyMonkey/Axios | Jun 8–30, 2020 | 1,498 (LV) | – | 49% | 49% | - | - | – | 1% |
| Change Research/CNBC | Jun 26–28, 2020 | 468 (LV) | – | 44% | 51% | – | – | – | – |
| East Carolina University | Jun 22–25, 2020 | 1,149 (RV) | ± 3.4% | 44% | 45% | – | – | 7% (Note: "Some other candidate" with 7%) | 4% |
| Public Policy Polling | Jun 22–23, 2020 | 1,157 (V) | – | 46% | 48% | – | – | – | 6% |
| Fox News | Jun 20–23, 2020 | 1,012 (RV) | ± 3% | 45% | 47% | – | – | 5% (Note: "Other" with 3%; would not vote with 2%) | 3% |
| NYT Upshot/Siena College | Jun 8–18, 2020 | 653 (RV) | ± 4.1% | 40% | 49% | – | – | 4% (Note: "Another candidate" with 3%; would not vote with 1%) | 7% |
| Gravis Marketing/OANN | Jun 17, 2020 | 631 (RV) | ± 3.9% | 46% | 43% | – | – | – | 10% |
| Redfield & Wilton Strategies | Jun 14–17, 2020 | 902 (LV) | ± 3.26% | 40% | 46% | 1% | 0% | 1% | 11% |
| Change Research/CNBC | Jun 12–14, 2020 | 378 (LV) | – | 45% | 47% | 1% | 1% | – | – |
| Public Policy Polling | Jun 2–3, 2020 | 913 (V) | ± 3.2% | 45% | 49% | – | – | – | 6% |

January 1, 2020 – May 31, 2020

| Poll source | Date(s) administered | Sample size | Margin of error | Donald Trump Republican | Joe Biden Democratic | Other | Undecided |
|---|---|---|---|---|---|---|---|
| Change Research/CNBC | May 29–31, 2020 | 806 (LV) | – | 45% | 46% | 4% | 4% |
| Harper Polling/Civitas | May 26–28, 2020 | 500 (LV) | ± 4.38% | 47% | 44% | – | 9% |
| Morning Consult | May 17–26, 2020 | 1,403 (LV) | – | 49% | 46% | – | – |
| Neighbourhood Research & Media | May 12–21, 2020 | 391 (LV) | – | 42% | 42% | – | – |
| Redfield & Wilton Strategies | May 10–14, 2020 | 859 (LV) | ± 3.3% | 43% | 45% | 3% (Note: "Third party/write-in" with 3%) | 8% |
| Meeting Street Insights (R) | May 9–13, 2020 | 500 (RV) | – | 47% | 47% | – | 6% |
| East Carolina University | May 7–9, 2020 | 1,111 (RV) | ± 3.4% | 46% | 43% | 7% (Note: "Other candidate" with 7%) | 4% |
| Civiqs/Daily Kos | May 2–4, 2020 | 1,362 (RV) | ± 3% | 46% | 49% | 4% (Note: "Someone else" with 4%) | 2% |
| Meredith College | Apr 27–28, 2020 | 604 (RV) | ± 4.0% | 40% | 47% | 5% (Note: "Someone else" with 5%) | 7% |
| SurveyUSA | Apr 23–26, 2020 | 580 (LV) | ± 5.5% | 45% | 50% | – | 5% |
| Public Policy Polling (Note: Poll sponsored by Protect Our Care, a pro-Affordable Care Act organization) | Apr 20–21, 2020 | 1,275 (RV) | – | 46% | 49% | – | 5% |
| Garin-Hart-Yang/Garin-Hart-Yang/Put NC First (D) | Apr 13–18, 2020 | 800 (LV) | – | 45% | 48% | – | – |
| GBAO Strategies/PLUS Paid Family Leave | Apr 13–16, 2020 | 500 (LV) | – | 46% | 48% | 1% | 4% |
| Public Policy Polling | Apr 14–15, 2020 | 1,318 (V) | – | 47% | 48% | – | 5% |
| Harper Polling | Apr 5–7, 2020 | 500 (LV) | ± 4.4% | 49% | 42% | – | 9% |
| East Carolina University | Feb 27–28, 2020 | 1,288 (RV) | ± 3.2% | 46% | 48% | – | – |
| NBC News/Marist College | Feb 23–27, 2020 | 2,120 (RV) | ± 2.4% | 45% | 49% | 1% | 5% |
| SurveyUSA | Feb 13–16, 2020 | 2,366 (RV) | ± 2.5% | 45% | 49% | – | 6% |
| Climate Nexus | Feb 11–15, 2020 | 675 (RV) | ± 3.9% | 44% | 46% | – | 11% |

January 1, 2018 – December 31, 2019

| Poll source | Date(s) administered | Sample size | Margin of error | Donald Trump Republican | Joe Biden Democratic | Other | Undecided |
|---|---|---|---|---|---|---|---|
| Fox News | Nov 10–13, 2019 | 1,504 (RV) | ± 2.5% | 43% | 45% | 5% | 5% |
| NYT Upshot/Siena College | Oct 13–26, 2019 | 651 (LV) | ± 4.4% | 48% | 46% | – | – |
| East Carolina University | Oct 2–9, 2019 | 1,076 (RV) | ± 3.0% | 46% | 50% | 4% | – (Note: The poll does not have a separate listing for this entry, which is instead added into the 'Other' grouping.) |
| Meredith College | Sep 29 – Oct 7, 2019 | 996 (RV) | ± 3.0% | 38% | 35% | 20% (Note: Refused/no answer with 0.2%) | 7% |
| Public Policy Polling | Oct 4–6, 2019 | 963 (V) | ± 3.2% | 46% | 51% | – | 4% |
| SurveyUSA | Aug 1–5, 2019 | 2,113 (RV) | ± 2.7% | 41% | 49% | – | 10% |
| Harper Polling | Aug 1–4, 2019 | 500 (LV) | ± 4.4% | 45% | 44% | – | 11% |
| Fabrizio Ward/AARP | Jul 29–31, 2019 | 600 (LV) | ± 4.0% | 45% | 49% | – | 5% |
| Public Policy Polling | Jun 17–18, 2019 | 610 (RV) | ± 4.0% | 46% | 49% | – | 5% |
| Emerson College | May 31 – Jun 3, 2019 | 932 (RV) | ± 3.1% | 44% | 56% | – | – |
| Spry Strategies (R) (Note: Poll sponsored by the North Carolina Republican Party) | May 25 – Jun 1, 2019 | 730 (LV) | – | 52% | 41% | – | 7% |
| Harper Polling | Feb 11–13, 2019 | 500 (LV) | ± 4.4% | 43% | 39% | 7% | 11% |
| Public Policy Polling | Jan 4–7, 2019 | 750 (RV) | ± 3.6% | 44% | 49% | – | 7% |
| Meredith College | Jan 21–25, 2018 | 621 (RV) | ± 4.0% | 45% | 46% | 8% | 1% |

Former candidates

Donald Trump vs. Michael Bloomberg

| Poll source | Date(s) administered | Sample size | Margin of error | Donald Trump (R) | Michael Bloomberg (D) | Undecided |
|---|---|---|---|---|---|---|
| East Carolina University | Feb 27–28, 2020 | 1,288 (RV) | ± 3.2% | 46% | 45% | – |
| Climate Nexus | Feb 11–15, 2020 | 675 (RV) | ± 3.9% | 41% | 47% | 12% |

Donald Trump vs. Cory Booker

| Poll source | Date(s) administered | Sample size | Margin of error | Donald Trump (R) | Cory Booker (D) | Other | Undecided |
|---|---|---|---|---|---|---|---|
| Harper Polling | Feb 11–13, 2019 | 500 (LV) | ± 4.4% | 44% | 36% | 6% | 14% |
| Public Policy Polling | Jan 4–7, 2019 | 750 (RV) | ± 3.6% | 46% | 45% | – | 9% |

Donald Trump vs. Pete Buttigieg

| Poll source | Date(s) administered | Sample size | Margin of error | Donald Trump (R) | Pete Buttigieg (D) | Other | Undecided |
|---|---|---|---|---|---|---|---|
| SurveyUSA | Feb 13–16, 2020 | 2,366 (RV) | ± 2.5% | 46% | 45% | – | 9% |
| Climate Nexus | Feb 11–15, 2020 | 675 (RV) | ± 3.9% | 43% | 42% | – | 14% |
| Fox News | Nov 10–13, 2019 | 1,504 (RV) | ± 2.5% | 43% | 39% | 6% | 8% |
| East Carolina University | Oct 2–9, 2019 | 1,076 (RV) | ± 3.0% | 49.4% | 46.8% | 3.8% | – |
| Meredith College | Sep 29 – Oct 7, 2019 | 996 (RV) | ± 3.0% | 38% | 27% | 25.1% (Note: Refused/no answer with 0.1%) | 8.9% |
| Public Policy Polling | Oct 4–6, 2019 | 963 (V) | ± 3.2% | 47% | 46% | – | 7% |
| SurveyUSA | Aug 1–5, 2019 | 2,113 (RV) | ± 2.7% | 43% | 41% | – | 16% |
| Public Policy Polling | Jun 17–18, 2019 | 610 (RV) | ± 4.0% | 47% | 44% | – | 9% |
| Emerson College | May 31 – Jun 3, 2019 | 932 (RV) | ± 3.1% | 48% | 52% | – | – |

Donald Trump vs. Kirsten Gillibrand

| Poll source | Date(s) administered | Sample size | Margin of error | Donald Trump (R) | Kirsten Gillibrand (D) | Other | Undecided |
|---|---|---|---|---|---|---|---|
| Meredith College | Jan 21–25, 2018 | 621 (RV) | ± 4.0% | 46% | 36% | 18% | 1% |

Donald Trump vs. Kamala Harris

| Poll source | Date(s) administered | Sample size | Margin of error | Donald Trump (R) | Kamala Harris (D) | Other | Undecided |
|---|---|---|---|---|---|---|---|
| East Carolina University | Oct 2–9, 2019 | 1,076 (RV) | ± 3.0% | 49.3% | 46.9% | 3.8% | – |
| Meredith College | Sep 29 – Oct 7, 2019 | 996 (RV) | ± 3.0% | 39.1% | 28.4% | 24.8% | 7.7% |
| Public Policy Polling | Oct 4–6, 2019 | 963 (V) | ± 3.2% | 47% | 47% | – | 5% |
| SurveyUSA | Aug 1–5, 2019 | 2,113 (RV) | ± 2.7% | 44% | 43% | – | 13% |
| Harper Polling | Aug 1–4, 2019 | 500 (LV) | ± 4.4% | 47% | 41% | – | 12% |
| Public Policy Polling | Jun 17–18, 2019 | 610 (RV) | ± 4.0% | 47% | 46% | – | 7% |
| Emerson College | May 31 – Jun 3, 2019 | 932 (RV) | ± 3.1% | 51% | 49% | – | – |
| Harper Polling | Feb 11–13, 2019 | 500 (LV) | ± 4.4% | 45% | 34% | 5% | 16% |
| Public Policy Polling | Jan 4–7, 2019 | 750 (RV) | ± 3.6% | 45% | 45% | – | 10% |

Donald Trump vs. Amy Klobuchar

| Poll source | Date(s) administered | Sample size | Margin of error | Donald Trump (R) | Amy Klobuchar (D) | Undecided |
|---|---|---|---|---|---|---|
| SurveyUSA | Feb 13–16, 2020 | 2,366 (RV) | ± 2.5% | 46% | 46% | 12% |
| Climate Nexus | Feb 11–15, 2020 | 675 (RV) | ± 3.9% | 43% | 40% | 17% |

Donald Trump vs. Beto O'Rourke

| Poll source | Date(s) administered | Sample size | Margin of error | Donald Trump (R) | Beto O'Rourke (D) | Undecided |
|---|---|---|---|---|---|---|
| Public Policy Polling | Jan 4–7, 2019 | 750 (RV) | ± 3.6% | 46% | 45% | 10% |

Donald Trump vs. Bernie Sanders

| Poll source | Date(s) administered | Sample size | Margin of error | Donald Trump (R) | Bernie Sanders (D) | Other | Undecided |
|---|---|---|---|---|---|---|---|
| Harper Polling/Civitas Institute (Note: Poll sponsored by the Civitas Institute, a conservative think tank) | Apr 5–7, 2020 | 500 (LV) | ± 4.3% | 50% | 40% | – | 10% |
| East Carolina University | Feb 27–28, 2020 | 1,288 (RV) | ± 3.2% | 48% | 43% | – | – |
| NBC News/Marist College | Feb 23–27, 2020 | 2,120 (RV) | ± 2.4% | 46% | 48% | 1% | 5% |
| SurveyUSA | Feb 13–16, 2020 | 2,366 (RV) | ± 2.5% | 45% | 50% | – | 5% |
| Climate Nexus | Feb 11–15, 2020 | 675 (RV) | ± 3.9% | 43% | 47% | – | 10% |
| Fox News | Nov 10–13, 2019 | 1,504 (RV) | ± 2.5% | 44% | 45% | 4% | 5% |
| NYT Upshot/Siena College | Oct 13–26, 2019 | 651 (LV) | ± 4.4% | 48% | 44% | – | – |
| East Carolina University | Oct 2–9, 2019 | 1,076 (RV) | ± 3.0% | 48% | 49% | 4% | – |
| Meredith College | Sep 29 – Oct 7, 2019 | 996 (RV) | ± 3.0% | 39% | 33% | 23% | 6% |
| Public Policy Polling | Oct 4–6, 2019 | 963 (V) | ± 3.2% | 47% | 50% | – | 4% |
| SurveyUSA | Aug 1–5, 2019 | 2,113 (RV) | ± 2.7% | 43% | 47% | – | 10% |
| Harper Polling | Aug 1–4, 2019 | 500 (LV) | ± 4.4% | 46% | 44% | – | 10% |
| Public Policy Polling | Jun 17–18, 2019 | 610 (RV) | ± 4.0% | 47% | 48% | – | 5% |
| Emerson College | May 31 – Jun 3, 2019 | 932 (RV) | ± 3.1% | 46% | 54% | – | – |
| Harper Polling | Feb 11–13, 2019 | 500 (LV) | ± 4.4% | 46% | 34% | 9% | 10% |
| Public Policy Polling | Jan 4–7, 2019 | 750 (RV) | ± 3.6% | 45% | 48% | – | 8% |

Donald Trump vs. Elizabeth Warren

| Poll source | Date(s) administered | Sample size | Margin of error | Donald Trump (R) | Elizabeth Warren (D) | Other | Undecided |
|---|---|---|---|---|---|---|---|
| East Carolina University | Feb 27–28, 2020 | 1,288 (RV) | ± 3.2% | 49% | 41% | – | – |
| SurveyUSA | Feb 13–16, 2020 | 2,366 (RV) | ± 2.5% | 48% | 44% | – | 8% |
| Climate Nexus | Feb 11–15, 2020 | 675 (RV) | ± 3.9% | 45% | 43% | – | 12% |
| Fox News | Nov 10–13, 2019 | 1,504 (RV) | ± 2.5% | 44% | 43% | 4% | 6% |
| NYT Upshot/Siena College | Oct 13–26, 2019 | 651 (LV) | ± 4.4% | 48% | 44% | – | – |
| East Carolina University | Oct 2–9, 2019 | 1,076 (RV) | ± 3.0% | 48.5% | 47.6% | 3.9% | – |
| Meredith College | Sep 29 – Oct 7, 2019 | 996 (RV) | ± 3.0% | 39.1% | 33% | 20.2% | 7.4% |
| Public Policy Polling | Oct 4–6, 2019 | 963 (V) | ± 3.2% | 46% | 49% | – | 5% |
| SurveyUSA | Aug 1–5, 2019 | 2,113 (RV) | ± 2.7% | 43% | 44% | – | 12% |
| Harper Polling | Aug 1–4, 2019 | 500 (LV) | ± 4.4% | 46% | 43% | – | 11% |
| Public Policy Polling | Jun 17–18, 2019 | 610 (RV) | ± 4.0% | 48% | 46% | – | 6% |
| Emerson College | May 31 – Jun 3, 2019 | 932 (RV) | ± 3.1% | 50% | 50% | – | – |
| Public Policy Polling | Jan 4–7, 2019 | 750 (RV) | ± 3.6% | 46% | 46% | – | 8% |
| Meredith College | Jan 21–25, 2018 | 621 (RV) | ± 4.0% | 48% | 40% | 12% | 1% |

Hypothetical polling

with Donald Trump and Michelle Obama

| Poll source | Date(s) administered | Sample size | Margin of error | Donald Trump (R) | Michelle Obama (D) | Other | Undecided |
|---|---|---|---|---|---|---|---|
| SurveyUSA | Aug 1–5, 2019 | 2,113 (RV) | ± 2.7% | 43% | 50% | – | 7% |

with Donald Trump and Oprah Winfrey

| Poll source | Date(s) administered | Sample size | Margin of error | Donald Trump (R) | Oprah Winfrey (D) | Other | Undecided |
|---|---|---|---|---|---|---|---|
| SurveyUSA | Aug 1–5, 2019 | 2,113 (RV) | ± 2.7% | 43% | 45% | – | 12% |
| Meredith College | Jan 21–25, 2018 | 621 (RV) | ± 4.0% | 48% | 38% | 12% | 2% |

with Donald Trump and a person whose name was randomly chosen out of a phone book

| Poll source | Date(s) administered | Sample size | Margin of error | Donald Trump (R) | Generic individual | Refused/no answer | Undecided |
|---|---|---|---|---|---|---|---|
| Meredith College | Sep 29 – Oct 7, 2019 | 996 (RV) | ± 3.0% | 42.7% | 40.1% | 1.1% | 16.2% |

with Donald Trump and Roy Cooper

| Poll source | Date(s) administered | Sample size | Margin of error | Donald Trump (R) | Roy Cooper (D) | Other | Undecided |
|---|---|---|---|---|---|---|---|
| Meredith College | Jan 21–25, 2018 | 621 (RV) | ± 4.0% | 45% | 43% | 11% | 1% |

with Donald Trump and Generic Democrat

| Poll source | Date(s) administered | Sample size | Margin of error | Donald Trump (R) | Generic Democrat | Other | Undecided |
|---|---|---|---|---|---|---|---|
| ALG Research/End Citizens United (Note: Poll sponsored by End Citizens United, a group that has exclusively endorsed Democrats) | Jan 8–12, 2020 | 700 (LV) | – | 44% | 48% | – | – |
| Public Policy Polling/End Citizens United | Sep 16–17, 2019 | 628 (RV) | ± 3.9% | 47% | 50% | – | 3% |
| Elon University | Feb 20 – Mar 7, 2019 | 914 (RV) | ± 3.5% | 36% | 48% | 6% | 9% (Note: "Other/it depends" with 6%; "Don't know" with 3%) |

with Donald Trump and Generic Opponent

| Poll source | Date(s) administered | Sample size | Margin of error | Donald Trump (R) | Generic Opponent | Undecided |
|---|---|---|---|---|---|---|
| East Carolina University | Oct 2–9, 2019 | 1,076 (RV) | ± 3% | 44% | 51% (Note: "It is time for someone else to be President" with 51% as opposed to "Trump should be re-elected if he is the Republican nominee") | 5% |

=== Results ===
2020 United States presidential election in North Carolina
| Party | Candidate | Votes | % | ±% |
|---|---|---|---|---|
| Republican | Donald Trump Mike Pence | 2,758,775 | 49.93% | +0.10% |
| Democratic | Joe Biden Kamala Harris | 2,684,292 | 48.59% | +2.42% |
| Libertarian | Jo Jorgensen Spike Cohen | 48,678 | 0.88% | −1.86% |
| Green | Howie Hawkins Angela Walker | 12,195 | 0.22% | −0.04% |
| Constitution | Don Blankenship William Mohr | 7,549 | 0.14% | N/A |
| Write-in | | 13,315 | 0.24% | -0.76% |
| Total votes | | 5,524,804 | 100.00% | N/A |

==== By county ====
| County | Donald Trump Republican | | Joe Biden Democratic | | Various candidates Other parties | | Margin | | Total |
| County | # | % | # | % | # | % | # | % | Total |
|---|---|---|---|---|---|---|---|---|---|
| Alamance | 46,056 | 53.50% | 38,825 | 45.10% | 1,210 | 1.40% | 7,231 | 8.40% | 86,091 |
| Alexander | 15,888 | 78.51% | 4,145 | 20.48% | 203 | 1.01% | 11,743 | 58.03% | 20,236 |
| Alleghany | 4,527 | 74.51% | 1,486 | 24.46% | 63 | 1.03% | 3,041 | 50.05% | 6,076 |
| Anson | 5,321 | 47.53% | 5,789 | 51.72% | 84 | 0.75% | -468 | -4.19% | 11,194 |
| Ashe | 11,451 | 72.41% | 4,164 | 26.33% | 199 | 1.26% | 7,287 | 46.08% | 15,814 |
| Avery | 7,172 | 75.83% | 2,191 | 23.17% | 95 | 1.00% | 4,981 | 52.66% | 9,458 |
| Beaufort | 16,437 | 62.46% | 9,633 | 36.61% | 245 | 0.93% | 6,804 | 25.85% | 26,315 |
| Bertie | 3,817 | 38.89% | 5,939 | 60.51% | 59 | 0.60% | -2,122 | -21.62% | 9,815 |
| Bladen | 9,676 | 56.50% | 7,326 | 42.78% | 123 | 0.72% | 2,350 | 13.72% | 17,125 |
| Brunswick | 55,850 | 61.94% | 33,310 | 36.94% | 1,015 | 1.12% | 22,540 | 25.00% | 90,175 |
| Buncombe | 62,412 | 38.63% | 96,515 | 59.74% | 2,642 | 1.63% | -36,103 | -21.11% | 161,569 |
| Burke | 31,019 | 69.55% | 13,118 | 29.41% | 465 | 1.04% | 17,901 | 40.14% | 44,602 |
| Cabarrus | 63,237 | 53.94% | 52,162 | 44.50% | 1,828 | 1.56% | 11,075 | 9.44% | 117,227 |
| Caldwell | 32,119 | 74.99% | 10,245 | 23.92% | 465 | 1.09% | 21,874 | 51.07% | 42,829 |
| Camden | 4,312 | 72.43% | 1,537 | 25.82% | 104 | 1.75% | 2,775 | 46.61% | 5,953 |
| Carteret | 30,028 | 70.33% | 12,093 | 28.32% | 574 | 1.35% | 17,935 | 42.01% | 42,695 |
| Caswell | 7,089 | 58.82% | 4,860 | 40.33% | 102 | 0.85% | 2,229 | 18.49% | 12,051 |
| Catawba | 56,588 | 67.83% | 25,689 | 30.79% | 1,148 | 1.38% | 30,899 | 37.04% | 83,425 |
| Chatham | 21,186 | 43.59% | 26,787 | 55.12% | 626 | 1.29% | -5,601 | -11.53% | 48,599 |
| Cherokee | 12,628 | 76.89% | 3,583 | 21.82% | 212 | 1.29% | 9,045 | 55.07% | 16,423 |
| Chowan | 4,471 | 57.44% | 3,247 | 41.71% | 66 | 0.85% | 1,224 | 15.73% | 7,784 |
| Clay | 5,112 | 74.16% | 1,699 | 24.65% | 82 | 1.19% | 3,413 | 49.51% | 6,893 |
| Cleveland | 33,798 | 65.87% | 16,955 | 33.05% | 555 | 1.08% | 16,843 | 32.82% | 51,308 |
| Columbus | 16,832 | 63.65% | 9,446 | 35.72% | 168 | 0.63% | 7,386 | 27.93% | 26,446 |
| Craven | 31,032 | 58.48% | 21,148 | 39.85% | 885 | 1.67% | 9,884 | 18.63% | 53,065 |
| Cumberland | 60,032 | 40.80% | 84,469 | 57.40% | 2,649 | 1.80% | -24,437 | -16.60% | 147,150 |
| Currituck | 11,657 | 72.19% | 4,195 | 25.98% | 295 | 1.83% | 7,462 | 46.21% | 16,147 |
| Dare | 13,938 | 57.52% | 9,936 | 41.00% | 358 | 1.48% | 4,002 | 16.52% | 24,232 |
| Davidson | 64,658 | 73.05% | 22,636 | 25.57% | 1,220 | 1.38% | 42,022 | 47.48% | 88,514 |
| Davie | 18,228 | 72.02% | 6,713 | 26.52% | 370 | 1.46% | 11,515 | 45.50% | 25,311 |
| Duplin | 13,793 | 60.72% | 8,767 | 38.60% | 155 | 0.68% | 5,026 | 22.12% | 22,715 |
| Durham | 32,459 | 18.04% | 144,688 | 80.42% | 2,767 | 1.54% | -112,229 | -62.38% | 179,914 |
| Edgecombe | 9,206 | 36.13% | 16,089 | 63.15% | 182 | 0.72% | -6,883 | -27.02% | 25,477 |
| Forsyth | 85,064 | 42.26% | 113,033 | 56.16% | 3,173 | 1.58% | -27,969 | -13.90% | 201,270 |
| Franklin | 20,901 | 55.96% | 15,879 | 42.51% | 571 | 1.53% | 5,022 | 13.45% | 37,351 |
| Gaston | 73,033 | 63.23% | 40,959 | 35.46% | 1,506 | 1.31% | 32,074 | 27.77% | 115,498 |
| Gates | 3,367 | 56.39% | 2,546 | 42.64% | 58 | 0.97% | 821 | 13.75% | 5,971 |
| Graham | 3,710 | 79.53% | 905 | 19.40% | 50 | 1.07% | 2,805 | 60.13% | 4,665 |
| Granville | 16,647 | 52.68% | 14,565 | 46.09% | 386 | 1.23% | 2,082 | 6.59% | 31,598 |
| Greene | 4,874 | 55.68% | 3,832 | 43.78% | 47 | 0.54% | 1,042 | 11.90% | 8,753 |
| Guilford | 107,294 | 37.72% | 173,086 | 60.84% | 4,106 | 1.44% | -65,792 | -23.12% | 284,486 |
| Halifax | 10,080 | 39.13% | 15,545 | 60.35% | 134 | 0.52% | -5,465 | -21.22% | 25,759 |
| Harnett | 35,177 | 60.35% | 22,093 | 37.90% | 1,023 | 1.75% | 13,084 | 22.45% | 58,293 |
| Haywood | 22,834 | 62.49% | 13,144 | 35.97% | 564 | 1.54% | 9,690 | 26.52% | 36,542 |
| Henderson | 40,032 | 58.55% | 27,211 | 39.80% | 1,128 | 1.65% | 12,821 | 18.75% | 68,371 |
| Hertford | 3,479 | 32.72% | 7,097 | 66.74% | 58 | 0.54% | -3,618 | -34.02% | 10,634 |
| Hoke | 9,453 | 43.69% | 11,804 | 54.55% | 382 | 1.76% | -2,351 | -10.86% | 21,639 |
| Hyde | 1,418 | 56.90% | 1,046 | 41.97% | 28 | 1.13% | 372 | 14.93% | 2,492 |
| Iredell | 67,010 | 65.46% | 33,888 | 33.10% | 1,473 | 1.44% | 33,122 | 32.36% | 102,371 |
| Jackson | 11,356 | 53.00% | 9,591 | 44.76% | 481 | 2.24% | 1,765 | 8.24% | 21,428 |
| Johnston | 68,353 | 61.38% | 41,257 | 37.05% | 1,747 | 1.57% | 27,096 | 24.33% | 111,357 |
| Jones | 3,280 | 59.37% | 2,197 | 39.76% | 48 | 0.87% | 1,083 | 19.61% | 5,525 |
| Lee | 16,469 | 56.77% | 12,143 | 41.86% | 396 | 1.37% | 4,326 | 14.91% | 29,008 |
| Lenoir | 14,590 | 51.36% | 13,605 | 47.89% | 214 | 0.75% | 985 | 3.47% | 28,409 |
| Lincoln | 36,341 | 72.37% | 13,274 | 26.43% | 602 | 1.20% | 23,067 | 45.94% | 50,217 |
| Macon | 14,211 | 68.51% | 6,230 | 30.03% | 302 | 1.46% | 7,981 | 38.48% | 20,743 |
| Madison | 7,979 | 61.02% | 4,901 | 37.48% | 196 | 1.50% | 3,078 | 23.54% | 13,076 |
| Martin | 6,532 | 52.09% | 5,911 | 47.14% | 97 | 0.77% | 621 | 4.95% | 12,540 |
| McDowell | 16,883 | 73.39% | 5,832 | 25.35% | 288 | 1.26% | 11,051 | 48.04% | 23,003 |
| Mecklenburg | 179,211 | 31.60% | 378,107 | 66.68% | 9,735 | 1.72% | -198,896 | -35.08% | 567,053 |
| Mitchell | 7,090 | 78.42% | 1,867 | 20.65% | 84 | 0.93% | 5,223 | 57.77% | 9,041 |
| Montgomery | 8,411 | 65.46% | 4,327 | 33.68% | 111 | 0.86% | 4,084 | 31.78% | 12,849 |
| Moore | 36,764 | 63.02% | 20,779 | 35.62% | 796 | 1.36% | 15,985 | 27.40% | 58,339 |
| Nash | 25,827 | 49.41% | 25,947 | 49.64% | 497 | 0.95% | -120 | -0.23% | 52,271 |
| New Hanover | 63,331 | 48.04% | 66,138 | 50.17% | 2,361 | 1.79% | -2,807 | -2.13% | 131,830 |
| Northampton | 3,989 | 39.46% | 6,069 | 60.03% | 52 | 0.51% | -2,080 | -20.57% | 10,110 |
| Onslow | 46,078 | 63.79% | 24,266 | 33.59% | 1,891 | 2.62% | 21,812 | 30.20% | 72,235 |
| Orange | 20,176 | 23.74% | 63,594 | 74.82% | 1,227 | 1.44% | -43,418 | -51.08% | 84,997 |
| Pamlico | 4,849 | 63.54% | 2,713 | 35.55% | 69 | 0.91% | 2,136 | 27.99% | 7,631 |
| Pasquotank | 9,770 | 49.10% | 9,832 | 49.41% | 295 | 1.49% | -62 | -0.31% | 19,897 |
| Pender | 21,956 | 64.26% | 11,723 | 34.31% | 490 | 1.43% | 10,233 | 29.95% | 34,169 |
| Perquimans | 4,903 | 65.51% | 2,492 | 33.30% | 89 | 1.19% | 2,411 | 32.21% | 7,484 |
| Person | 13,184 | 60.22% | 8,465 | 38.66% | 245 | 1.12% | 4,719 | 21.56% | 21,894 |
| Pitt | 38,982 | 44.51% | 47,252 | 53.96% | 1,339 | 1.53% | -8,270 | -9.45% | 87,573 |
| Polk | 7,689 | 62.22% | 4,518 | 36.56% | 151 | 1.22% | 3,171 | 25.66% | 12,358 |
| Randolph | 56,894 | 77.60% | 15,618 | 21.30% | 804 | 1.10% | 41,276 | 56.30% | 73,316 |
| Richmond | 11,830 | 56.98% | 8,754 | 42.16% | 179 | 0.86% | 3,076 | 14.82% | 20,763 |
| Robeson | 27,806 | 58.93% | 19,020 | 40.31% | 362 | 0.76% | 8,786 | 18.62% | 47,188 |
| Rockingham | 31,301 | 65.47% | 15,992 | 33.45% | 516 | 1.08% | 15,309 | 32.02% | 47,809 |
| Rowan | 49,297 | 67.15% | 23,114 | 31.49% | 997 | 1.36% | 26,183 | 35.66% | 73,408 |
| Rutherford | 24,891 | 72.30% | 9,135 | 26.53% | 403 | 1.17% | 15,756 | 45.77% | 34,429 |
| Sampson | 17,411 | 60.84% | 10,966 | 38.32% | 241 | 0.84% | 6,445 | 22.52% | 28,618 |
| Scotland | 7,473 | 50.58% | 7,186 | 48.64% | 116 | 0.78% | 287 | 1.94% | 14,775 |
| Stanly | 25,458 | 75.01% | 8,129 | 23.95% | 352 | 1.04% | 17,329 | 51.06% | 33,939 |
| Stokes | 20,144 | 78.37% | 5,286 | 20.57% | 273 | 1.06% | 14,858 | 57.80% | 25,703 |
| Surry | 27,538 | 75.16% | 8,721 | 23.80% | 379 | 1.04% | 18,817 | 51.36% | 36,638 |
| Swain | 4,161 | 58.87% | 2,780 | 39.33% | 127 | 1.80% | 1,381 | 19.54% | 7,068 |
| Transylvania | 11,636 | 57.03% | 8,444 | 41.38% | 324 | 1.59% | 3,192 | 15.65% | 20,404 |
| Tyrrell | 1,044 | 57.46% | 758 | 41.72% | 15 | 0.82% | 286 | 15.74% | 1,817 |
| Union | 80,382 | 61.36% | 48,725 | 37.19% | 1,904 | 1.45% | 31,657 | 24.17% | 131,011 |
| Vance | 8,391 | 39.96% | 12,431 | 59.20% | 177 | 0.84% | -4,040 | -19.24% | 20,999 |
| Wake | 226,197 | 35.80% | 393,336 | 62.25% | 12,297 | 1.95% | -167,139 | -26.45% | 631,830 |
| Warren | 3,752 | 36.45% | 6,400 | 62.18% | 141 | 1.37% | -2,648 | -25.73% | 10,293 |
| Washington | 2,781 | 44.82% | 3,396 | 54.73% | 28 | 0.45% | -615 | -9.91% | 6,205 |
| Watauga | 14,451 | 44.85% | 17,122 | 53.14% | 647 | 2.01% | -2,671 | -8.29% | 32,220 |
| Wayne | 30,709 | 55.29% | 24,215 | 43.60% | 613 | 1.11% | 6,494 | 11.69% | 55,537 |
| Wilkes | 27,592 | 77.80% | 7,511 | 21.18% | 363 | 1.02% | 20,081 | 56.62% | 35,466 |
| Wilson | 19,581 | 48.07% | 20,754 | 50.95% | 400 | 0.98% | -1,173 | -2.88% | 40,735 |
| Yadkin | 15,933 | 79.97% | 3,763 | 18.89% | 227 | 1.14% | 12,170 | 61.08% | 19,923 |
| Yancey | 7,516 | 66.21% | 3,688 | 32.49% | 148 | 1.30% | 3,828 | 33.72% | 11,352 |
| Totals | 2,758,775 | 49.93% | 2,684,292 | 48.59% | 81,737 | 1.48% | 74,483 | 1.34% | 5,524,804 |

Counties that flipped from Republican to Democratic

- New Hanover (largest municipality: Wilmington)
- Nash (largest municipality: Rocky Mount)

Counties that flipped from Democratic to Republican

- Scotland (largest municipality: Laurinburg)

==== By congressional district ====
Trump won eight of 13 congressional districts.

| District | Trump | Biden | Representative |
|---|---|---|---|
| 1st | 45% | 54% | G. K. Butterfield |
| 2nd | 34% | 64% | George Holding |
| 2nd | 34% | 64% | Deborah K. Ross |
| 3rd | 61% | 38% | Greg Murphy |
| 4th | 32% | 66% | David Price |
| 5th | 67% | 32% | Virginia Foxx |
| 6th | 37% | 61% | Mark Walker |
| 6th | 37% | 61% | Kathy Manning |
| 7th | 58% | 41% | David Rouzer |
| 8th | 52% | 46% | Richard Hudson |
| 9th | 53% | 45% | Dan Bishop |
| 10th | 67% | 31% | Patrick McHenry |
| 11th | 55% | 43% | Madison Cawthorn |
| 12th | 28% | 70% | Alma Adams |
| 13th | 67% | 32% | Ted Budd |

== Analysis ==
The rural-urban divide was even more prevalent in North Carolina this election than in past elections. Biden carried eight of North Carolina's ten largest counties (losing only the Charlotte-area suburban counties of Union and Gaston), and overperformed Obama's 2008 margin in the six largest: Wake (Raleigh), Mecklenburg (Charlotte), Guilford (Greensboro), Forsyth (Winston-Salem), Durham (Durham), and Buncombe (Asheville), in which he received 62%, 67%, 61%, 56%, 80%, and 60% of the vote, respectively. Biden furthermore became the first Democrat to carry New Hanover County, home of Wilmington, since 1976. He also flipped Nash County, which had last voted for Obama in 2012, before switching to Trump in 2016, back to the Democratic column. Biden held Trump to a single-digit margin in the Charlotte-area suburban county of Cabarrus, the first time since 1976 that the Republican margin in this county has been less than 10%.

Conversely, Trump held or outperformed his 2016 margin in Robeson, Bladen, Martin, Granville and Gates counties, all counties that had been reliably Democratic in the 20th century and which had voted for Obama twice before flipping to Trump in 2016. Biden thereby became the first Democrat ever to win the presidency without Robeson County, the largest county in the Lumber River region of the state and the county which had given Jimmy Carter his largest raw vote margin in the state in both 1976 and 1980. Trump picked off neighboring Scotland County, one of only 15 counties he flipped nationally, becoming the first Republican to carry it since Ronald Reagan in 1984 and making Biden the first Democrat to win without Scotland since the county's creation in 1899. Biden also became the first Democrat to win the White House without Granville and Gates counties since Grover Cleveland in 1892, the first since Cleveland in 1884 to win without Bladen County, the first since James Buchanan in 1856 to win without Richmond County and the first ever to win without Martin County.

=== Edison exit polls ===
2020 presidential election in North Carolina by demographic subgroup (Edison exit polling)
| Demographic subgroup | Biden | Trump | % of total vote |
|---|---|---|---|
| Total vote | 48.59 | 49.93 | 100 |
Ideology
| Liberals | 93 | 6 | 20 |
| Moderates | 66 | 32 | 39 |
| Conservatives | 9 | 90 | 40 |
Party
| Democrats | 97 | 3 | 34 |
| Republicans | 4 | 96 | 37 |
| Independents | 50 | 46 | 30 |
Gender
| Men | 45 | 54 | 44 |
| Women | 53 | 46 | 56 |
Race/ethnicity
| White | 33 | 66 | 65 |
| Black | 92 | 7 | 23 |
| Latino | 57 | 42 | 5 |
| Asian | – | – | 2 |
| Other | 56 | 40 | 5 |
Age
| 18–24 years old | 55 | 43 | 8 |
| 25–29 years old | 59 | 36 | 6 |
| 30–39 years old | 57 | 43 | 14 |
| 40–49 years old | 52 | 46 | 16 |
| 50–64 years old | 46 | 53 | 31 |
| 65 and older | 40 | 59 | 24 |
Sexual orientation
| LGBT | 76 | 22 | 5 |
| Not LGBT | 47 | 52 | 95 |
Education
| High school or less | 38 | 62 | 18 |
| Some college education | 43 | 56 | 27 |
| Associate degree | 50 | 48 | 18 |
| Bachelor's degree | 55 | 44 | 22 |
| Postgraduate degree | 64 | 35 | 14 |
Income
| Under $30,000 | 51 | 47 | 15 |
| $30,000–49,999 | 54 | 44 | 22 |
| $50,000–99,999 | 49 | 49 | 36 |
| $100,000–199,999 | 47 | 52 | 22 |
| Over $200,000 | 47 | 53 | 5 |
Issue regarded as most important
| Racial inequality | 94 | 5 | 21 |
| Coronavirus | 84 | 15 | 14 |
| Economy | 16 | 82 | 35 |
| Crime and safety | 11 | 88 | 12 |
| Health care | 66 | 33 | 12 |
Region
| East | 45 | 54 | 23 |
| Research Triangle | 62 | 37 | 22 |
| Charlotte Area | 55 | 44 | 18 |
| Piedmont/Central | 44 | 54 | 20 |
| West | 36 | 62 | 17 |
Area type
| Urban | 69 | 29 | 33 |
| Suburban | 39 | 60 | 40 |
| Rural | 40 | 59 | 27 |
Family's financial situation today
| Better than four years ago | 17 | 82 | 45 |
| Worse than four years ago | 91 | 7 | 20 |
| About the same | 69 | 30 | 34 |

== See also ==
- United States presidential elections in North Carolina
- 2020 North Carolina elections
- 2020 United States presidential election
- 2020 Democratic Party presidential primaries
- 2020 Republican Party presidential primaries
- 2020 Libertarian Party presidential primaries
- 2020 Green Party presidential primaries
- 2020 United States elections

== Notes ==
General footnotes

Partisan clients
