= Climate Nexus =

US non-profit organization

Climate Nexus was a non-profit journalism and climate communication organization. The organization was primarily focused on the role of the United States in Climate Change. Material from their reporting has been used by a number of national and international publications, through their network Nexus Media News. Climate Nexus was formed in 2011. Initial support to the group was from the Skoll Foundation.

The organization closed on June 21, 2024, due to challenges with the funding environment. A Semafor report said it was largely due to funding: with some funders not wanting to work on climate justice, and others only wanting to support technologies like carbon dioxide removal.

== Websites ==
- Official website
