= List of California state agencies =

The Government of California's executive branch includes numerous types of entities such as departments, commissions, boards, panels, bureaus, and offices.

The generic term for any entity is "department". Most entities are grouped together to form "agencies", which are led by a secretary of the Governor's Cabinet. Thus, department directors report to a cabinet secretary. The agencies are commonly described as "superagencies", especially by government insiders, to distinguish them from the common usage of the term "government agency". The seven superagencies are Government Operations; Labor and Workforce Development; Transportation; Natural Resources; Environmental Protection; Health and Human Services; and Business, Consumer Services, and Housing.

The Department of Food and Agriculture (CDFA) and the Department of Corrections and Rehabilitation (CDCR) are also led by secretaries, not department directors. Several departments, such as CDFA and CDCR, report directly to the Governor and their chief executive officers are members of the Governor's cabinet.

Lastly, several departments are led by a constitutional executive officer who is elected separately from the Governor, such as the Department of Justice (Attorney General) and the Department of Insurance (Insurance Commissioner).

1. Accountancy, California Board of (CBA)
2. Achieving a Better Life Experience, California (CalABLE)
3. Acupuncture Board, California (Board)
4. Administrative Hearings, Office of (OAH)
5. Administrative Law, Office of (OAL)
6. Aging, California Commission on (CCOA)
7. Aging, California Department of (AGING)
8. Agricultural Labor Relations Board (ALRB)
9. Air Resources Board (ARB)
10. Alcoholic Beverage Control Appeals Board (ABCAB)
11. Alcoholic Beverage Control, Department of (ABC)
12. Allocation Board, State (SAB)
13. Alternative Energy and Advanced Transportation Financing Authority, California (CAEATFA)
14. Apprenticeship Council, California (CAC)
15. Arbitration Certification Program (ACP)
16. Architects Board, California (CAB)
17. Arts Council, California (CAC)
18. Assembly, California State (Assembly)
19. Athletic Commission, California State (CSAC)
20. Auditor, California State (BSA)
21. Automotive Repair, Bureau of (BAR)
22. Baldwin Hills Conservancy (BHC)
23. Bar of California, State (CALBAR)
24. Barbering and Cosmetology, Board of (BBC)
25. Behavioral Sciences, Board of (BBS)
26. Biodiversity Council, California (CBC)
27. Boating and Waterways Commission, California (DBW-Com)
28. Building Standards Commission, California (CBSC)
29. Bureau of Real Estate Appraisers (BREA)
30. Business and Economic Development, Governor's Office of (Go-Biz)
31. Business, Consumer Services, and Housing Agency, California (BCSH)
32. Cannabis Control Appeals Panel (CCAP)
33. Cannabis Control, Department of (DCC)
34. Cemetery and Funeral Bureau (CFB)
35. Central Valley Flood Protection Board (CVFPB)
36. Child Support Services, Department of (DCSS)
37. Chiropractic Examiners, Board of (BCE)
38. Citizens Compensation Commission, California (CCCC)
39. Citizens Redistricting Commission (CRC)
40. Civil Rights Department (CRD)
41. Coachella Valley Mountains Conservancy (CVMC)
42. Coastal Commission, California (Coastal)
43. Coastal Conservancy, California (SCC)
44. Colorado River Board of California (CRB)
45. Community Colleges, California (CCCCO)
46. Community Services & Development, Department of (CSD)
47. Compensation Insurance Fund, State (SCIF)
48. Conservation Corps, California (CCC)
49. Conservation, Department of (DOC)
50. Consumer Affairs, Department of (DCA)
51. Contractors State License Board (CSLB)
52. Controller's Office, California State (SCO)
53. Cool California (CoolCal)
54. Corrections & Rehabilitation, Department of (CDCR)
55. Counties, California State Association of (CSAC)
56. Court Reporters Board of California (CRB)
57. Courts, California (Courts)
58. Criminal Justice and Behavioral Health, Council on (CCJBH)
59. Data and Innovation, Office of (ODI)
60. Debt Limit Allocation Committee, California (CDIAC)
61. Debt and Investment Advisory Commission, California (CDLAC)
62. Delta Protection Commission (Delta)
63. Delta Stewardship Council (Deltacounc)
64. Dental Board of California (DBC)
65. Dental Hygiene Board of California (DHBC)
66. Developmental Disabilities, State Council on (SCDD)
67. Developmental Services, Department of (DDS)
68. Disability Access, California Commission on (CCDA)
69. Disabled Veterans Business Enterprise Advisory Council (DVBE)
70. Earthquake Authority, California (CEA)
71. Education, Department of (CDE)
72. Education, California State Board of (SBE)
73. Educational Facilities Authority, California (CEFA)
74. Emergency Medical Services Authority (EMSA)
75. Emergency Services, Governor's Office of (Cal OES)
76. Employment Development Department (EDD)
77. Employment Training Panel (ETP)
78. Energy Commission, California (CEC)
79. Energy Infrastructure Safety, Office of (OEIS)
80. Engineers, Land Surveyors, and Geologists, Board of Professional (BPELSG)
81. Environmental Health Hazard Assessment, Office of (OEHHA)
82. Environmental Protection Agency (CALEPA)
83. Equalization, Board of (BOE)
84. Exposition & State Fair, California (CAL EXPO)
85. Fair Political Practices Commission (FPPC)
86. Film Commission, California (CFC)
87. Finance, Department of (DOF)
88. Financial Protection and Innovation, California Department of (DBO)
89. Financing Coordinating Committee, California
90. Fire Marshal, Office of the State
91. First 5 California (First 5)
92. Fish & Game Commission (FGC)
93. Fish & Wildlife, Department of (CDFW)
94. Food & Agriculture, Department of (CDFA)
95. Forestry & Fire Protection, Board of (BOF)
96. Forestry & Fire Protection, California Department of (CAL FIRE)
97. Franchise Tax Board (FTB)
98. Gambling Control Commission (CGCC)
99. General Services, Department of (DGS)
100. Government Operations Agency
101. Governor, Office of the (GO)
102. Guide Dogs for the Blind, Board of (BGDB)
103. Health and Human Services Agency (CHHS)
104. Health Benefit Exchange, California (HBEX)
105. Health Care Services, Department of (DHCS)
106. Health Facilities Financing Authority, California
107. Health Information Integrity, California Office of (CALOHI)
108. Health Planning and Development, Office of Statewide (OSHPD)
109. Health and Safety and Workers' Compensation, Commission on
110. Healthy Food Financing Initiative Council, California
111. High-Speed Rail Authority (CAHSRA)
112. Highway Patrol, California (CHP)
113. Historical Records Advisory Board, California
114. Historical Resources Commission, State (SHRC)
115. Horse Racing Board, California (CHRB)
116. Hospitals, Department of State
117. Housing & Community Development, Department of (HCD)
118. Housing Finance Agency (CALHFA)
119. Human Resources, Department of (CalHR)
120. Independent Living Council, California State (CALSILC)
121. Industrial Development Financing Advisory Commission, California
122. Industrial Relations, Department of (DIR)
123. Industrial Welfare Commission (IWC)
124. Infrastructure and Economic Development Bank (I-Bank) (IBANK)
125. Inspector General, Office of the (OIG)
126. Insurance, Department of (CDI)
127. Judicial Performance, Commission on (CJP)
128. Justice, Department of (DOJ)
129. Juvenile Parole Board (JPB)
130. Labor and Workforce Development Agency (LWDA)
131. Lands Commission, California State (SLC)
132. Landscape Architects Technical Committee (LATC)
133. Law Revision Committee (CLRC)
134. Legislative Analyst's Office (LAO)
135. Legislature, California State (LEGISLATURE)
136. Library, California State (CSL)
137. Lieutenant Governor, Office of (LTG)
138. Little Hoover Commission (LHC)
139. Lottery, California (LOTTERY)
140. Managed Health Care, Department of (DMHC)
141. Medical Board of California (MBC)
142. Mental Health Services Oversight and Accountability Commission (MHSOAC)
143. Mentally Ill Offenders, Council on (COMIO)
144. Military Department, California
145. Mining & Geology Board, State (SMGB)
146. Motor Vehicles, Department of (DMV)
147. Native American Heritage Commission (NAHC)
148. Natural Resources Agency, California
149. Naturopathic Medicine Committee
150. New Motor Vehicle Board (NMVB)
151. Occupational Safety and Health Appeals Board (DIR, OSHAB)
152. Occupational Therapy, California Board of (BOT)
153. Ocean Protection Council (OPC)
154. Optometry, Board of
155. Osteopathic Medical Board of California (OMBC)
156. Parks and Recreation, California Department of
157. Parks and Recreation Commission, California State (PARKS)
158. Parole Hearings, Board of (CDCR, BOPH)
159. Patient Advocate, Office of the (OPA)
160. Peace Officer Standards & Training, Commission on (POST)
161. Personnel Board, State (SPB)
162. Pesticide Regulation, Department of (CDPR)
163. Pharmacy, California State Board of
164. Physical Therapy Board of California (PTBC)
165. Physician Assistant Board
166. Pilot Commissioners for the Bays of San Francisco, San Pablo, and Suisun, Board of (BOPC)
167. Planning and Research, Governor's Office of (OPR)
168. Podiatric Medicine, Board of (BPM)
169. Pollution Control Financing Authority, California
170. Pooled Money Investment Board
171. Prison Industry Authority (CALPIA)
172. Private and Postsecondary Education, Bureau for (BPPE)
173. Professional Fiduciaries Bureau
174. Psychology, Board of
175. Public Employees Retirement System, California (CalPERS)
176. Public Employment Relations Board, California (PERB)
177. Public Health, California Department of (CDPH)
178. Public Utilities Commission, California (CPUC)
179. Racial Equity Commission, California (REC) https://racialequity.opr.ca.gov/
180. Real Estate Appraisers, Bureau of (OREA)
181. Real Estate, Department of (DRE)
182. Regenerative Medicine, California Institute for (CIRM)
183. Registered Nursing, Board of (RN)
184. Rehabilitation, Department of (DOR)
185. Resources Recycling and Recovery, Department of
186. Respiratory Care Board of California (RCB)
187. Sacramento-San Joaquin Delta Conservancy
188. San Diego River Conservancy (SDRC)
189. San Francisco Bay Conservation & Development Commission (BCDC)
190. San Gabriel and Lower Los Angeles Rivers and Mountains Conservancy (RMC)
191. San Joaquin River Conservancy (SJRC)
192. Santa Monica Mountains Conservancy (SMMC)
193. Save Our Water
194. Scholarshare Investment Board
195. School Finance Authority, California
196. Secretary of State, California (SOS)
197. Security and Investigative Services, Bureau of (BSIS)
198. Seismic Safety Commission, California (SSC)
199. Senate, California State
200. Sierra Nevada Conservancy
201. Social Services, Department of (CDSS)
202. Speech-Language Pathology and Audiology and Hearing Aid Dispensers Board
203. State Assistance for Enterprise, Business and Industrial Development Corp (SAFE-BIDCO)
204. State Mandates, Commission on (CSM)
205. Status of Women and Girls, California Commission on the
206. Structural Pest Control Board
207. Student Aid Commission, California (CSAC)
208. Systems Integration, Office of (OSI)
209. Tahoe Conservancy, California
210. Tax Credit Allocation Committee, California
211. Tax and Fee Administration, California
212. Teacher Credentialing, Commission on (CTC)
213. Technology, Department of
214. Telemetry Integrity and Modifications Enforcement Agency (TIME Agency)
215. Toxic Substances Control, California Department of (DTSC)
216. Traffic Safety, California Office of (OTS)
217. Transportation Agency, California State
218. Transportation Commission, California (CTC)
219. Transportation, Department of (DOT, CALTRANS)
220. Treasurer's Office, State (STO)
221. Tribal Advisor, Governor's Office of
222. Unemployment Insurance Appeals Board (CUIAB)
223. Uniform Custom Cost Accounting Commission (SCO)
224. University of California (UC)
225. University, California State (CALSTATE, CSU)
226. Veterans Affairs, Department of (CalVet)
227. Veterans Board, California
228. Veterinary Medical Board, California (VMB)
229. Victim Compensation Board, California (CalVCB)
230. Visit California
231. Vocational Nursing and Psychiatric Technicians, Board of (BVNPT)
232. Volunteers, California
233. Water Commission, California
234. Water Quality Monitoring Council, California
235. Water Resources, Department of (DWR)
236. Water Resources Control Board, State (WRCB)
237. Wildlife Conservation Board (WCB)
238. Worker's Compensation Appeals Board
239. Workforce Development Board, California (CWDB)

== See also ==
- List of law enforcement agencies in California
- List of California fire departments
