= California executive branch =

Executive branch of the California state government

The California executive branch consists of elected officers and other offices and officers. The elected executive officers are:

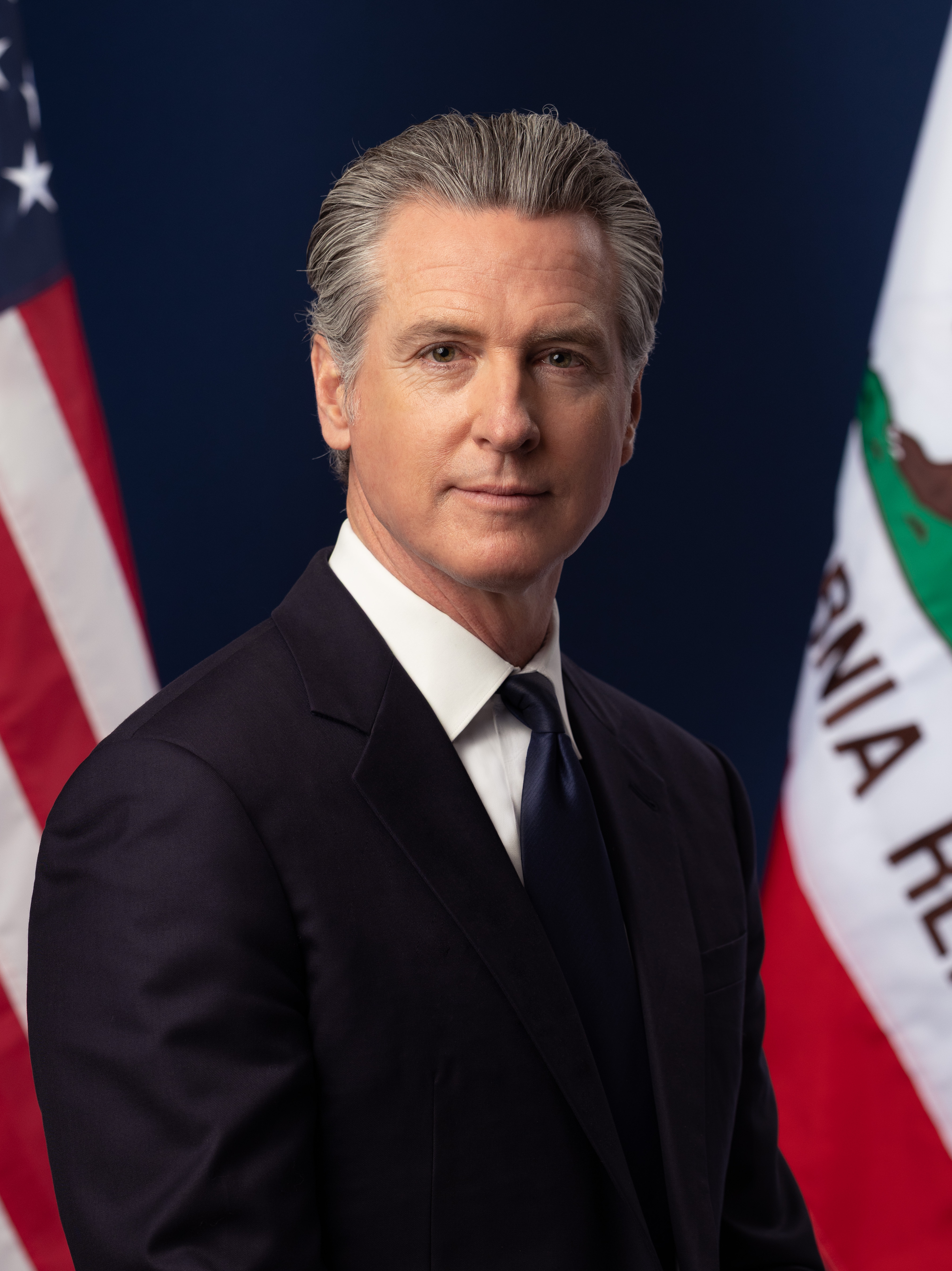
Gavin Newsom (D)
Governor

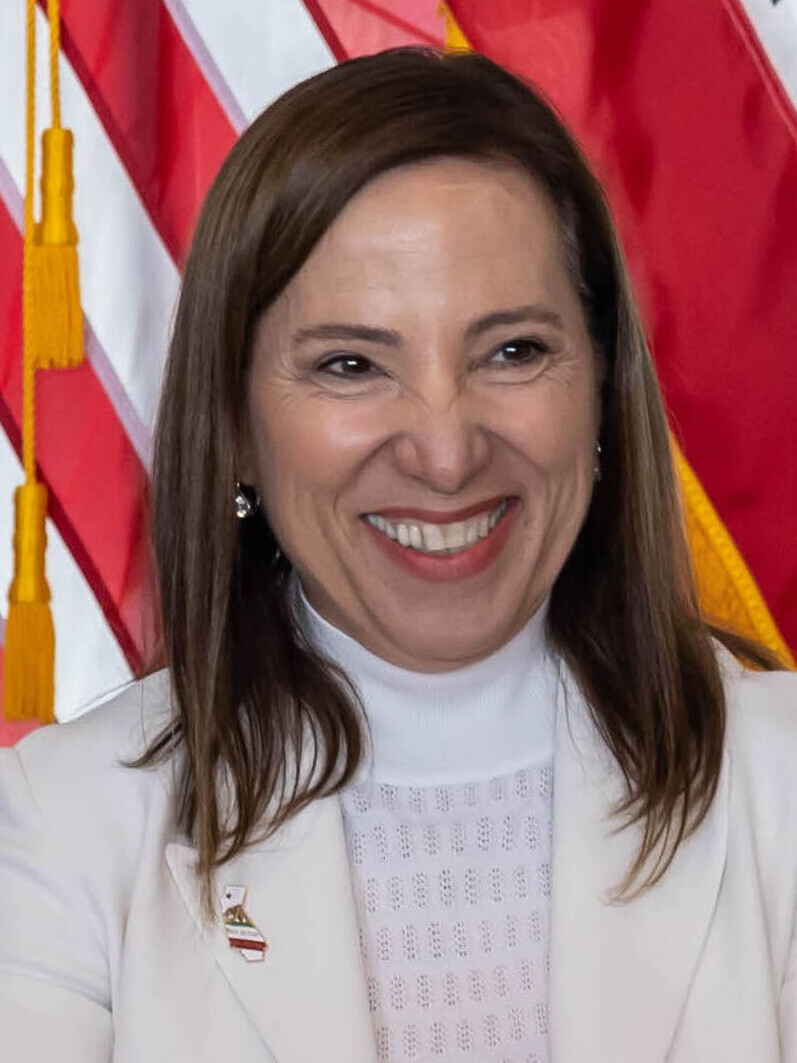
Eleni Kounalakis (D)
Lieutenant Governor

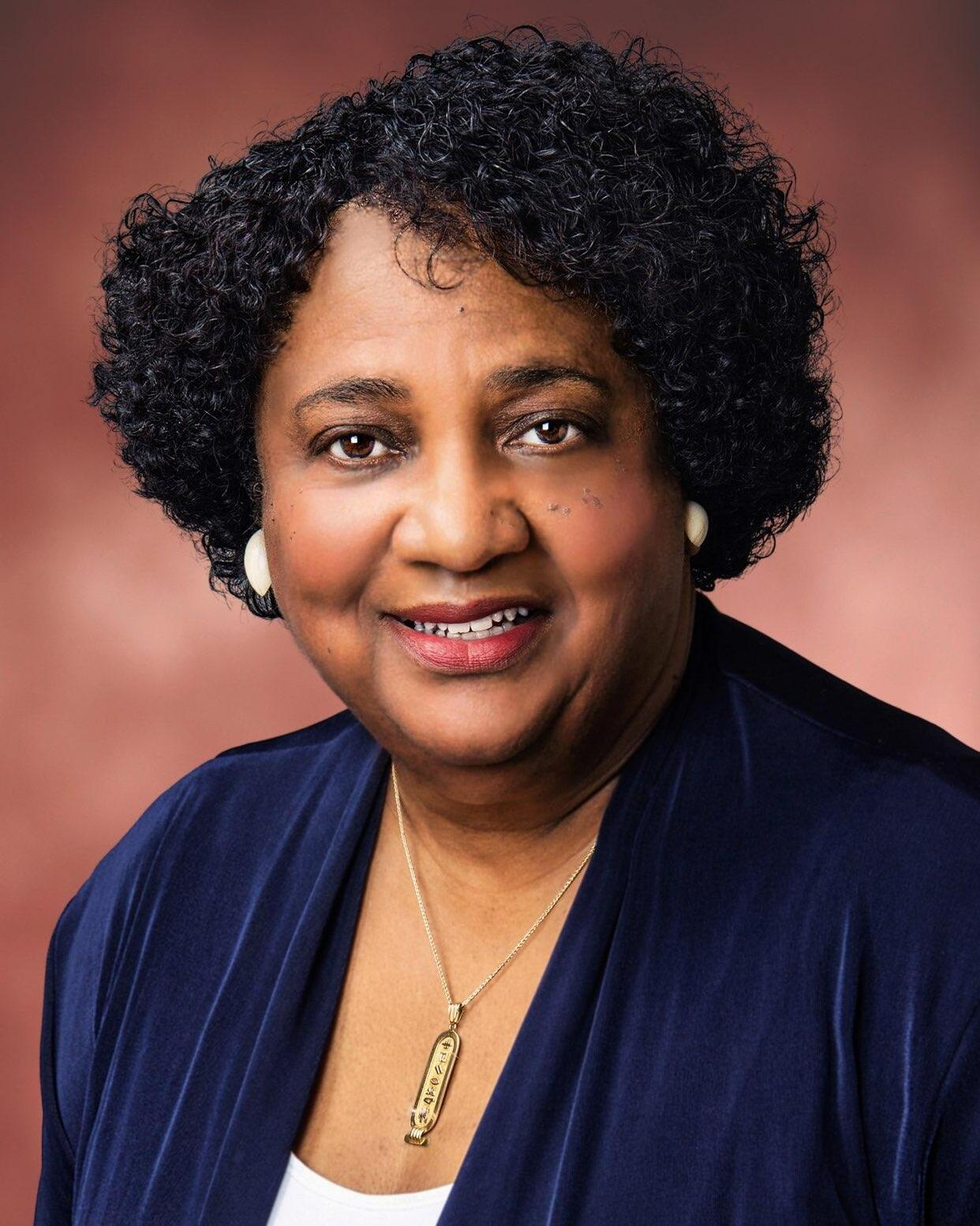
Shirley Weber (D)
Secretary of State

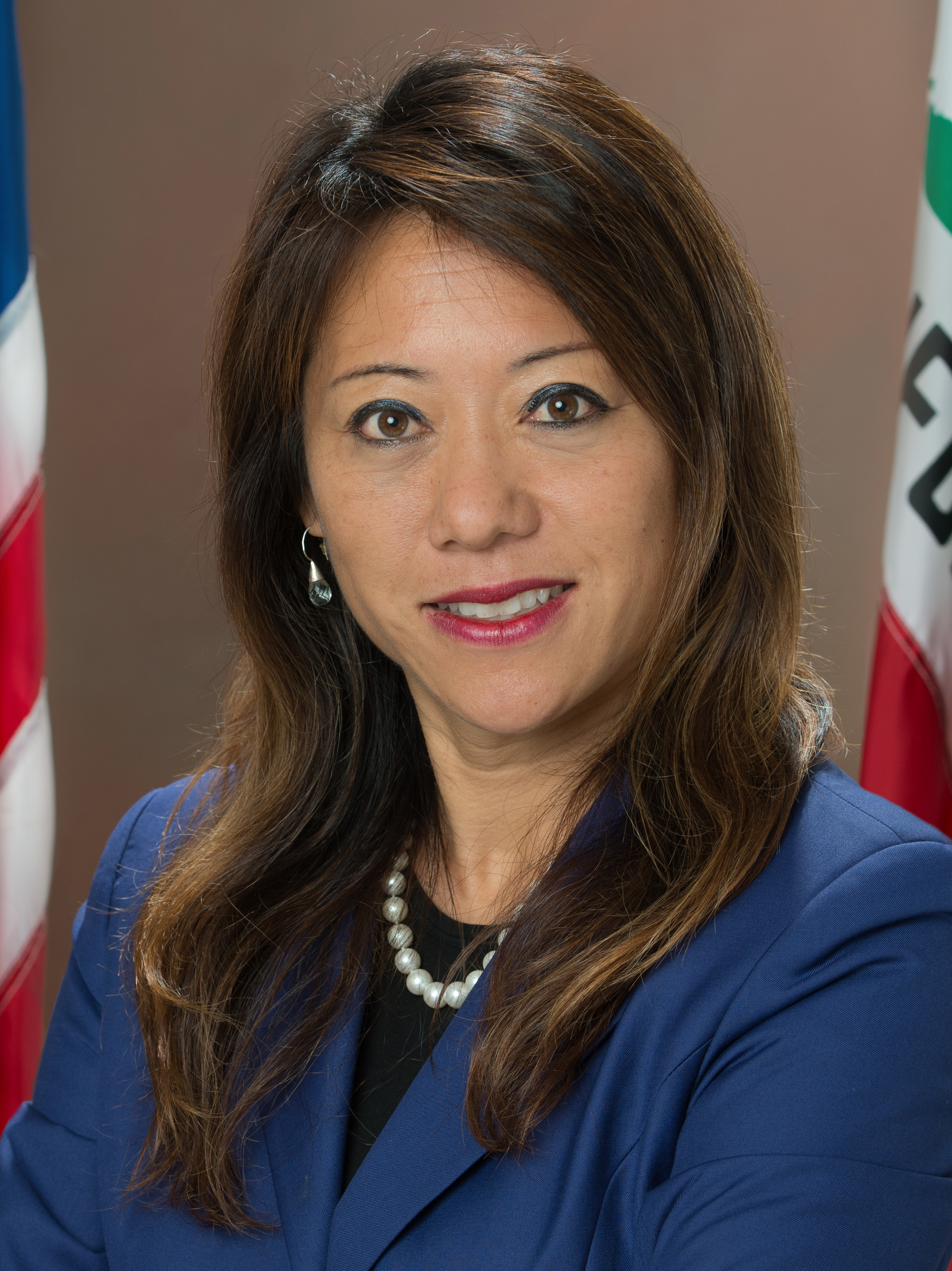
Fiona Ma (D)
State Treasurer

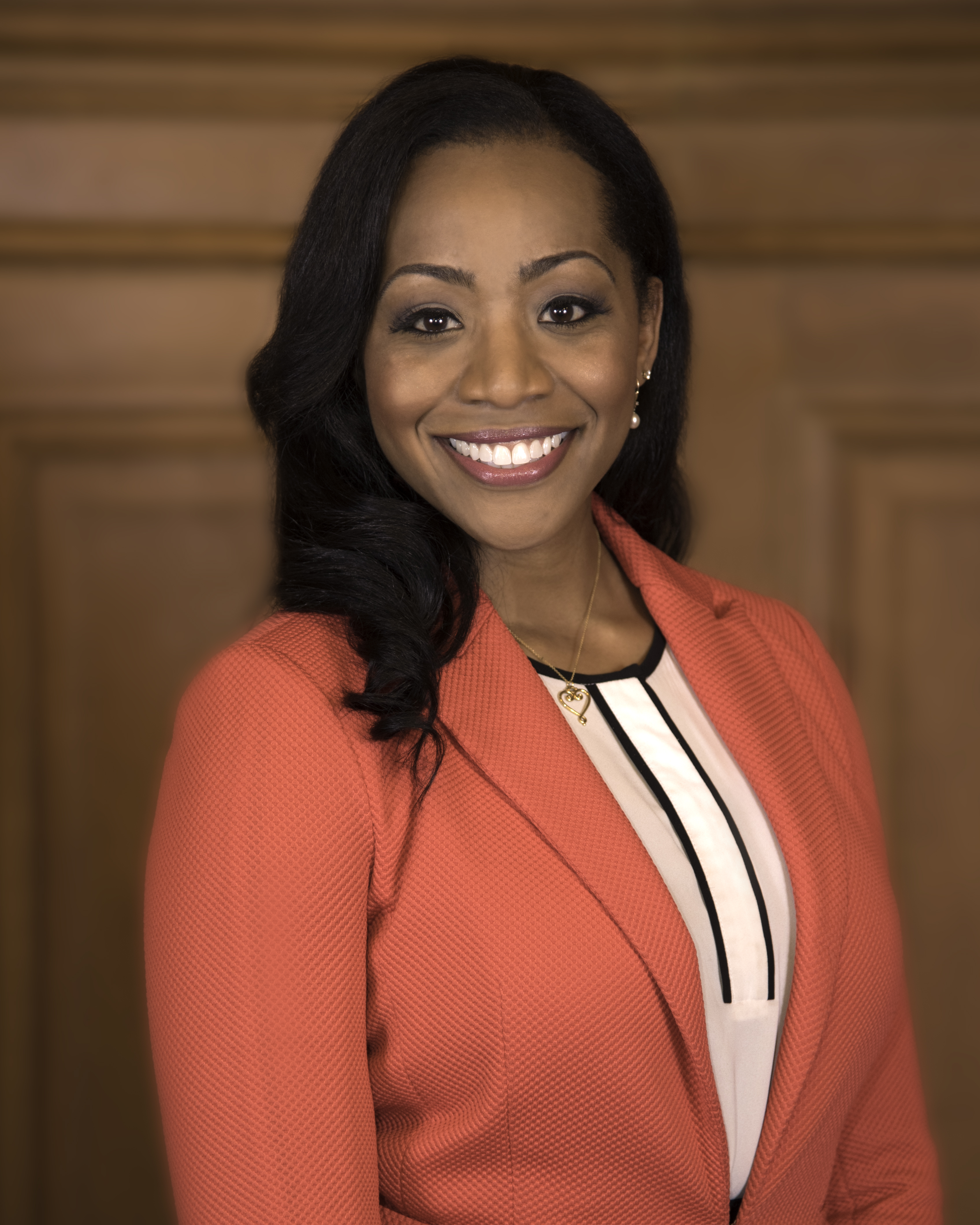
Malia Cohen (D)
State Controller

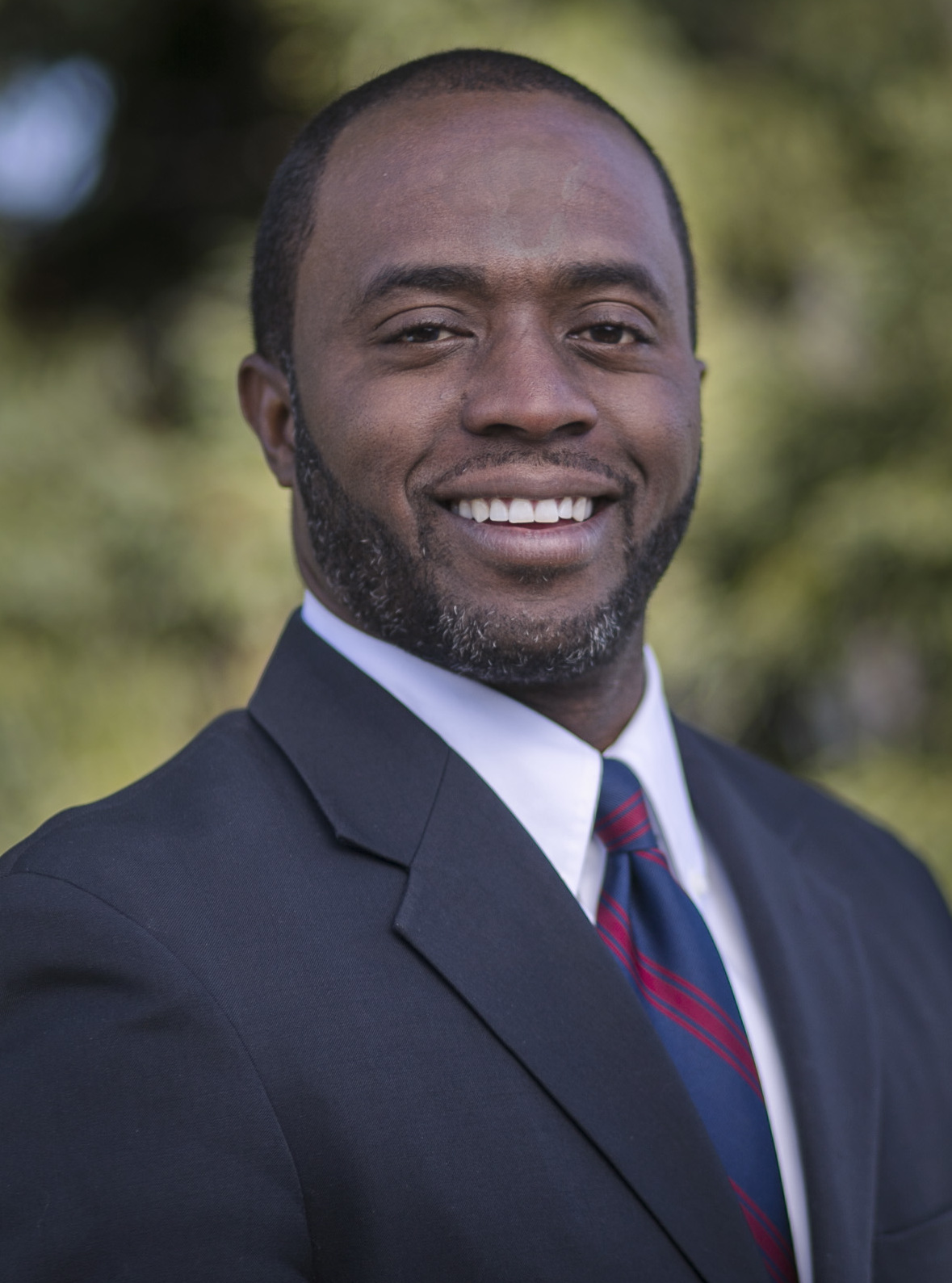
Tony Thurmond (D)
State Superintendent of Public Instruction

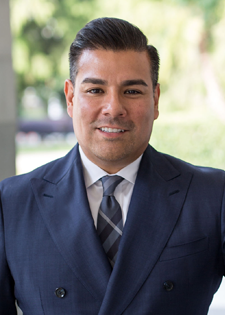
Ricardo Lara (D)
Insurance Commissioner

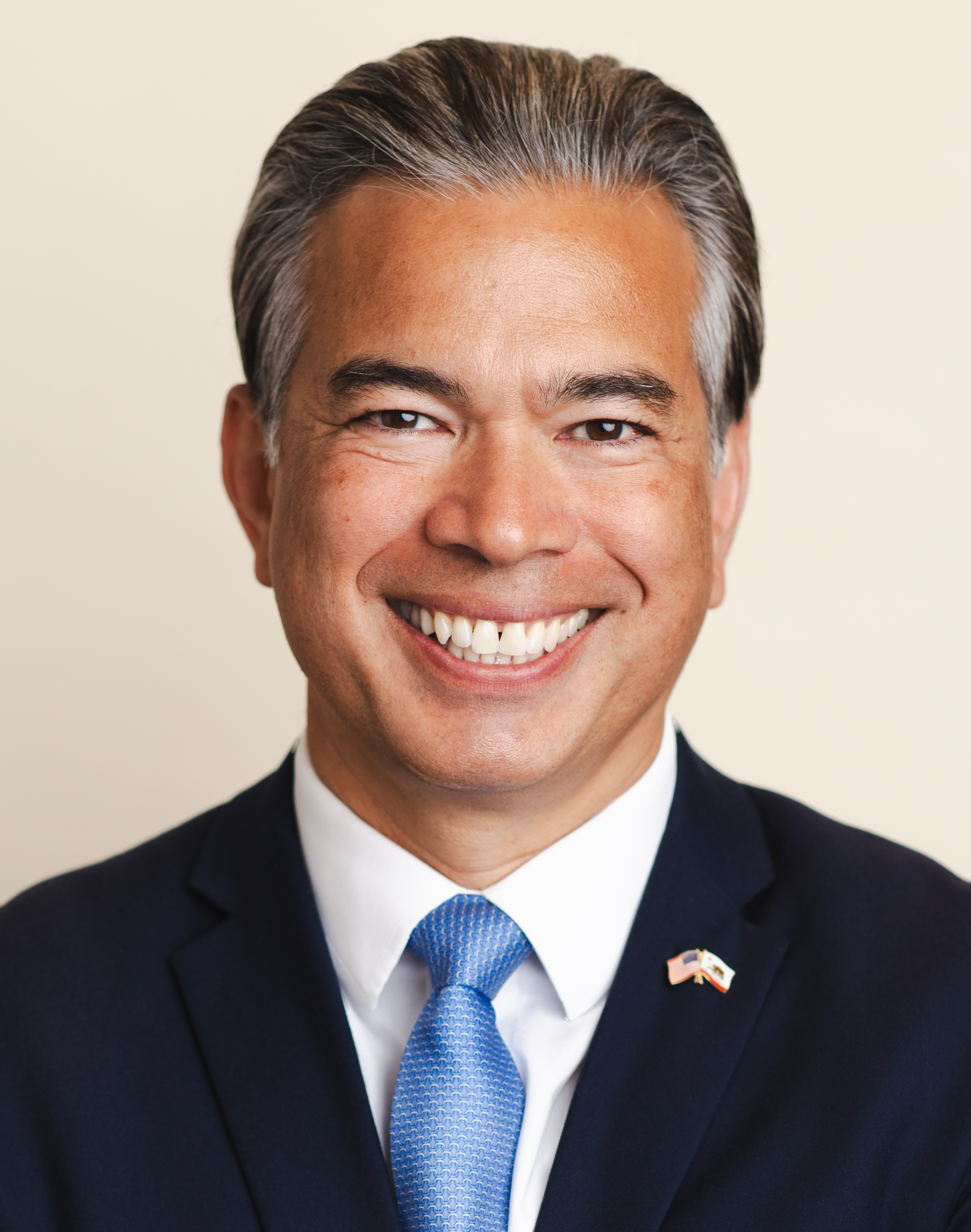
Rob Bonta (D)
Attorney General of California

== Employees ==
Total number of employees is 227,536 excluding California State Universities. In 2004, there were 4,462 job classifications, many of which had no employees occupying the position, as a workaround for certain hiring practices. As part of a civil service reform initiative beginning in 2013, 700 job titles were eliminated.

The California Department of Human Resources primarily oversees the state's civil service system, with some additional functions handled by the California State Personnel Board.

=== 1979 Little Hoover Commission report ===
In 1979, then-Governor Jerry Brown requested a report on the State's personnel system from the Little Hoover Commission, an independent government oversight agency, which resulted in several recommendations of which some were implemented, including the creation of the Department of Personnel Administration but other recommendations such as the dissolution of the California State Personnel Board were not. In the 1980s, a recommendation to decentralize hiring to departments was implemented.

=== 2010s modernization initiative ===
In 2012, California Department of Human Resources was created by combining the functions the former Department of Personnel Administration (DPA) with most of the operations of the State Personnel Board, largely implementing recommendations by experts in the prior decades.

In 2012, the California Government Operations Agency was created under Governor Jerry Brown. Its director, Marybel Batjer, launched an initiative of civil service reform intended to make state employment more attractive to talented employees relative to the private sector.

In 2015, the first engagement survey of state employees was conducted using a sample of 5,000. The survey showed that employees largely believed that their work was important, but did not strongly believe that workers were held accountable or that they received proper recognition for good work.

In 2016, the state rolled out a new hiring website, for the first time allowing for electronic job applications for state jobs. Unusually, it was programmed by state employees rather than an external contractor.

== Governor ==
Agencies under the direction of a secretary that report directly to the governor are cabinet-level agencies. Some agencies such as the state controller, attorney general, and insurance commissioner are headed by independent elected officials. The state auditor is appointed by the governor with confirmation by the legislature, but operates independently of both.

One relatively new top-level agency, California Government Operations Agency, was created in 2012 to help modernize the government.

Agencies under the governor
Agency	Abbreviation
Office of the Governor	GOV
Governor's Office of Business and Economic Development	Go-Biz
Governor's Office of Emergency Services	Cal OES
Governor’s Office of Land Use and Climate Innovation	Cal LCI
Business, Consumer Services and Housing Agency	BCSH
Alcoholic Beverage Control Appeals Board	ABCAB
Horse Racing Board	CHRB
Housing Finance Agency	CALHFA
Department of Fair Employment and Housing	DFEH
Department of Consumer Affairs	DCA
Department of Alcoholic Beverage Control	ABC
Department of Housing and Community Development	HCD
Department of Business Oversight	DBO
Seismic Safety Commission	SSC
Environmental Protection Agency	CalEPA
Air Resources Board	ARB
Office of Environmental Health Hazard Assessment	OEHHA
Department of Pesticide Regulation	CDPR
Department of Toxic Substances Control	DTSC
Department of Resources Recycling and Recovery	CalRecycle
State Water Resources Control Board	SWRCB
Government Operations Agency	CalGovOps
Franchise Tax Board	FTB
Department of General Services	DGS
California Department of Technology	CDT
Office of Administrative Law	OAL
California Victim Compensation Board	CalVCB
Department of Tax and Fee Administration	CDTFA
Department of Human Resources	CalHR
State Personnel Board	SPB
Public Employee's Retirement System	CALPERS
Teacher's Retirement System	CalSTRS
Health and Human Services Agency	CHHS
Department of Aging	CDA
Department of Public Health	CDPH
Department of Child Support Services	DCSS
Department of Community Services and Development	CSD
Department of Developmental Services	DDS
Emergency Medical Services Authority	EMSA
Department of Health Care Services	DHCS
Department of Managed Health Care	DMHC
Department of State Hospitals	DSH
Department of Rehabilitation	DOR
Department of Social Services	CDSS
Office of Statewide Health Planning and Development	OSHPD
Labor and Workforce Development Agency	LWDA
Employment Development Department	EDD
Department of Industrial Relations	DIR
Agricultural Labor Relations Board	ALRB
California Public Employment Relations Board	PERB
Unemployment Insurance Appeals Board	CUIAB
Workforce Investment Board	CWDB
Employment Training Panel	ETP
Natural Resources Agency	Resources
Department of Water Resources	DWR
Department of Forestry and Fire Protection	CAL FIRE
Department of Conservation	DOC
Department of Parks & Recreation	PARKS
California Conservation Corps	CCC
Department of Fish and Wildlife	CDFW
California Coastal Commission	Coastal
California Energy Commission	ENERGY
State Lands Commission	SLC
Native American Heritage Commission	NAHC
Wildlife Conservation Board	WCB
Central Valley Flood Protection Board	CVFPB
San Francisco Bay Conservation and Development Commission	BCDC
California Water Commission	CWC
Colorado River Board of California	CRB
California Tahoe Conservancy	Tahoe
San Gabriel and Lower Los Angeles Rivers and Mountains Conservancy	RMC
Santa Monica Mountains Conservency	SMMC
Sacramento-San Joaquin Delta Conservancy	DeltaConservancy
Sierra Nevada Conservancy	SNC
State Coastal Conservancy	SCC
California State Transportation Agency	CalSTA
California Highway Patrol	CHP
Department of Motor Vehicles	DMV
Department of Transportation	CALTRANS
Board of Pilot Commissioners	BOPC
High Speed Rail Authority	CAHSRA
California Transportation Commission	CTC
Department of Corrections and Rehabilitation	CDCR
Department of Finance	DOF
Department of Veterans Affairs	CalVet
Department of Food and Agriculture	CDFA
Military Department	Calguard

== Independent entities ==
- State Board of Education
  - State Superintendent of Public Instruction
    - California Department of Education
- Insurance Commissioner
  - California Department of Insurance
- Secretary of State
- Lieutenant Governor
- State Controller
- State Treasurer
- State Board of Equalization
- Attorney General
  - Department of Justice
- Board of Governors, Community Colleges
- California Postsecondary Education Commission
- California Student Aid Commission
- Trustees of State Universities
- University of California Board of Regents
- Fair Political Practices Commission
- California Gambling Commission
- State Lands Commission
- California Lottery Commission
- Public Employment Relations Board
- California Public Utilities Commission
- California Transportation Commission

== Overview ==
Generally, a Cabinet-level head of an agency in California holds the title of "secretary", while the head of a department holds the title of "director." Exceptions include the head of the Department of the California Highway Patrol, whose title is actually "commissioner."

The vast majority of state government agencies and departments are headquartered in Sacramento or in parts of Sacramento County near the city of Sacramento; in turn, the larger agencies and departments also have local offices around the state which report to headquarters in Sacramento. Notable exceptions include the California Public Utilities Commission and the California Department of Industrial Relations, which are both headquartered in San Francisco.

== History ==
Other defunct statewide elected offices that no longer exist include the comptroller (which became controller in 1862), the surveyor general (1849–1926), and the clerk of the Supreme Court.

In June 2012, Governor Jerry Brown obtained approval from the legislature to proceed with a reorganization plan. By July 2013, the business and housing components of BTH will be consolidated with the consumer components of SCSA to form the new Business, Consumer Services and Housing Agency; the remainder of SCSA and the Technology Agency will merge into the new Government Operations Agency; and the transportation components of BTH along with the formerly separate California Transportation Commission will become part of the new Transportation Agency.

== See also ==
- California
- Government of California
- Politics of California
