= Government of Alameda County, California =

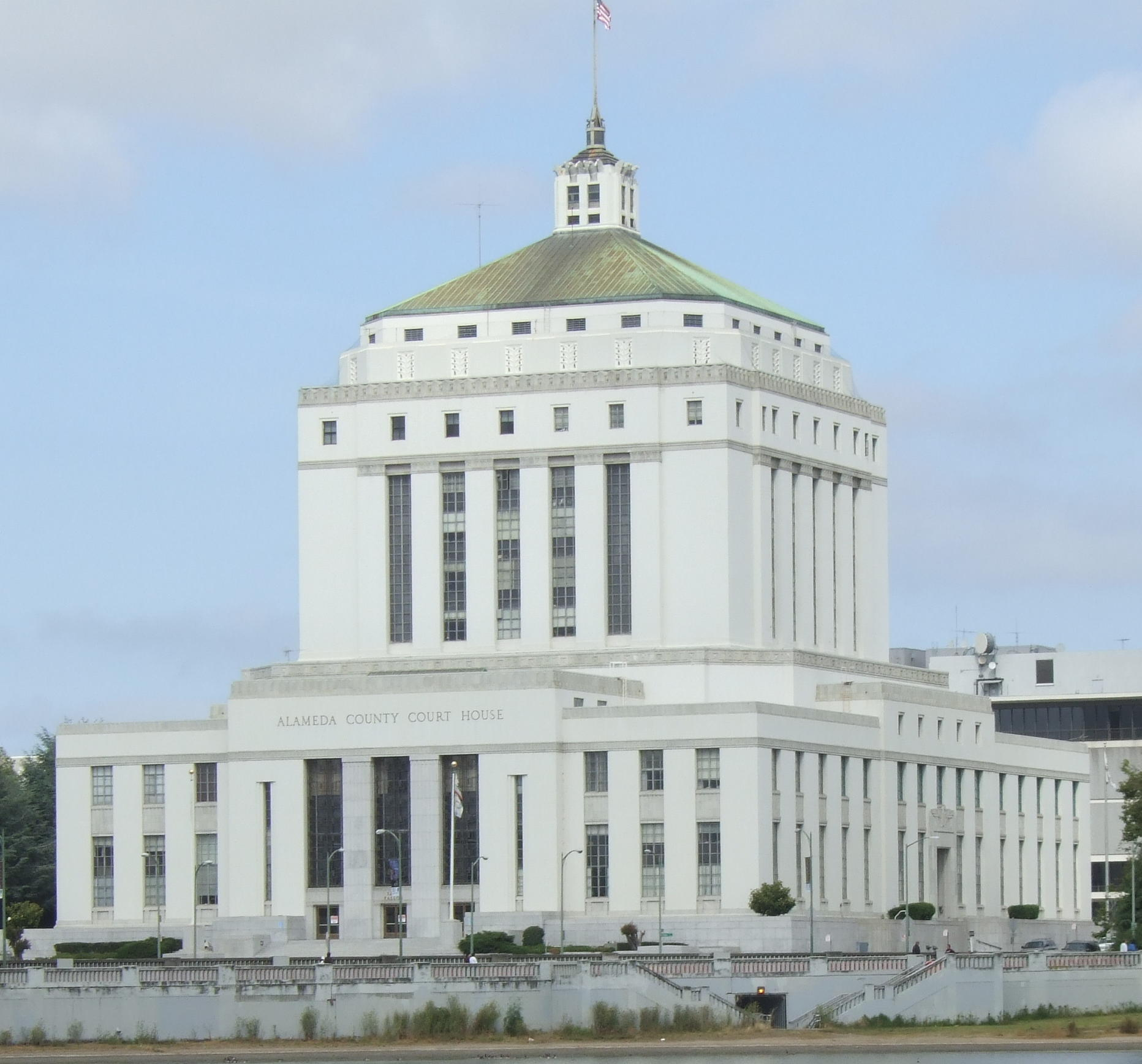
René C. Davidson Courthouse, Alameda County Superior Court, Oakland, in June 2009

The government of Alameda County operates as a charter county under the California Constitution, California law, and the Charter of the County of Alameda. Much of the government of California is in practice the responsibility of county governments such as Alameda County. The county government provides countywide services such as elections and voter registration, law enforcement, jails, vital records, property records, tax collection, public health, and social services. In addition the county serves as the local government for all unincorporated areas. Alameda County services are provided to residents by more than 9,000 employees working in 21 different agencies and departments with an annual budget expenditure of $2.4 billion.

It is composed of the elected five-member Board of Supervisors, several other elected offices and officers including the Sheriff-Coroner, the District Attorney, Assessor, Auditor-Controller/Clerk-Recorder, and Treasurer-Tax Collector, and numerous county departments and entities under the supervision of the County Administrator.

Some chartered municipalities such as the city of Oakland and the city of Berkeley provide their own law enforcement, public safety, libraries, parks and recreation, zoning, and similar services. Other incorporated cities have some or all of these services provided by the County under a contract arrangement. In addition, several entities of the government of California have jurisdiction conterminous with Alameda County, such as the Alameda County Superior Court.

== Organization ==
=== Board of Supervisors ===
Under its foundational Charter, the five-member elected Alameda County Board of Supervisors (BOS) is the county legislature. The board operates in a legislative, executive, and quasi-judicial capacity. As a legislative authority, it can pass ordinances for the unincorporated areas (ordinances that affect the whole county, like posting of restaurant ratings, must be ratified by the individual city). As an executive body, it can tell the county departments what to do, and how to do it. As a quasi-judicial body, the Board is the final venue of appeal in the local planning process.

The current members are:

- David Haubert — District 1
- Elisa Márquez — District 2
- Lena Tam — District 3
- Nate Miley — District 4
- Nikki Fortunato Bas — District 5

=== Elected officers ===
In addition to the Board of Supervisors, there are several elected officers that form the Government of Alameda County that are required by the California Constitution and California law, and authorized under the Charter.

The Alameda County Sheriff-Coroner provides general-service law enforcement to unincorporated areas of the county, serving as the equivalent of the county police for unincorporated areas of the county, as well as incorporated cities within the county who have contracted with the agency for law-enforcement services (known as "contract cities").

The Alameda County District Attorney prosecutes felony and misdemeanor crimes that occur within the jurisdiction of Alameda County. The District Attorney has been criticized for allowing private debt collectors to use the District Attorney's letterheads for letters demanding payment of debts and threatening jailtime.

=== Other departments ===
The County Administrator (CAO) advises, assists, and acts as an agent for the Board of Supervisors in all matters under the Board's jurisdiction. As of 2013, with an annual take-home salary of more than $400,000, the CAO made more than similar positions in San Francisco, Chicago, and New York.

The Social Services Agency (SSA) administers multiple California welfare programs within the county, such as Medi-Cal (Medicaid), CalFresh (food stamps), CalWORKs (TANF), and general assistance.

The Health Care Services Agency (HCSA) administers programs such as a Medically Indigent Service Program (MISP) and the Health Program of Alameda County (HealthPAC, a.k.a. the Low Income Health Program/LIHP). (Note: The city of Berkeley administers its own public health department independently of Alameda County)

The Information Technology Department (ITD) provides services across all other county departments to ensure the county maximizes productivity using both modern and traditional technologies as well as maintains county systems like cybersecurity and communications. On October 9, 2024, ITD published a policy approved by the Board of Supervisors on county use of generative artificial intelligence (GenAI). According to their mission statements, it is the goal of both ITD and the Board of Supervisors to improve the county and its people. The county's collaborative efforts on this policy are stated to focus on establishing clear rules for GenAI usage throughout all agencies and departments.

Other agencies and departments include the:

- Community Development Agency, including the:
  - Department of Agriculture / Weights and Measures
  - Housing & Community Development Department
  - Planning Department
- General Services Agency
- Public Works Agency
- Register of Voters
- Child Support Services
- Fire Department
- Probation Department
- Public Defender
- County Library

== Law ==
The Charter of the County of Alameda is the foundational document of the county. The Alameda County Code is the codification of ordinances passed by the Board of Supervisors. The Alameda County Administrative Code establishing the powers and duties of all officers and the procedures and rules of operation of all departments. Every act prohibited or declared unlawful, and every failure to perform an act required, by the ordinances are misdemeanor crimes, unless otherwise specified as infractions.

== Other governments ==
=== California ===
The Alameda County Superior Court, which covers the entire county, is not a County department but a division of the State's trial court system. Historically, the courthouses were county-owned buildings that were maintained at county expense, which created significant friction since the trial court judges, as officials of the state government, had to lobby the county Board of Supervisors for facility renovations and upgrades. In turn, the state judiciary successfully persuaded the state Legislature to authorize the transfer of all courthouses to the state government in 2008 and 2009 (so that judges would have direct control over their own courthouses). Courthouse security is still provided by the county government under a contract with the state.
