= Government of San Joaquin County, California =

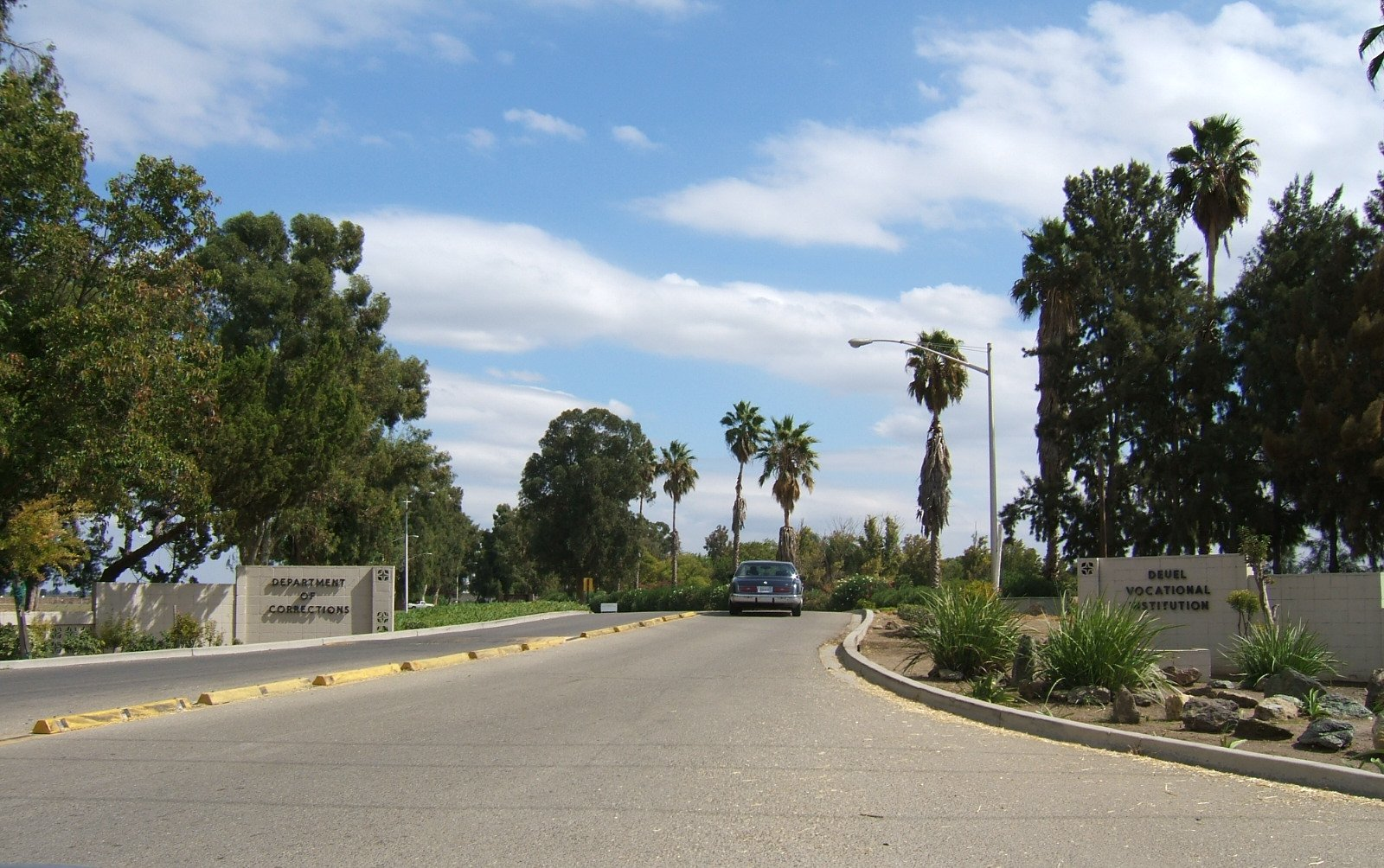
Deuel Vocational Institution

The government of San Joaquin County operates as a general law county under the California Constitution and law. Much of the government of California is in practice the responsibility of county governments such as San Joaquin County. The county government provides countywide services such as elections and voter registration, law enforcement, jails, vital records, property records, tax collection, public health, and social services. In addition the county serves as the local government for all unincorporated areas.

It is composed of the elected five-member Board of Supervisors, several other elected offices including the Sheriff, District Attorney, and Assessor, and numerous county departments and entities under the supervision of the County Administrator.

Some chartered cities such as Stockton and Tracy provide municipal services such as police, public safety, libraries, parks and recreation, and zoning. Some other cities arrange to have the County provide some or all of these services on a contract basis. In addition, several entities of the government of California have jurisdiction conterminous with San Joaquin County, such as the San Joaquin County Superior Court.

== Organization ==
=== Board of Supervisors ===
The five-member elected San Joaquin County Board of Supervisors (BOS) is the county legislature. The board operates in a legislative, executive, and quasi-judicial capacity. As a legislative authority, it can pass ordinances for the unincorporated areas (ordinances that affect the whole county, like posting of restaurant ratings, must be ratified by the individual city). As an executive body, it can tell the county departments what to do, and how to do it. As a quasi-judicial body, the Board is the final venue of appeal in the local planning process.

As of February 2025, the members of the San Joaquin County Board of Supervisors are:

- Mario Gardea (District 1),
- Paul Canepa (District 2 and Chair),
- Sonny Dhaliwal (District 3 and Vice Chair),
- Steven J. Ding (District 4), and
- Robert Rickman (District 5).

=== Elected officers ===
In addition to the Board of Supervisors, there are several elected officers that form the Government of San Joaquin County that are required by the California Constitution and California law.

The San Joaquin County Sheriff provides general-service law enforcement to unincorporated areas of the county, serving as the equivalent of the county police for unincorporated areas of the county, as well as incorporated cities within the county who have contracted with the agency for law-enforcement services (known as "contract cities").

The San Joaquin County District Attorney prosecutes felony and misdemeanor crimes that occur within the jurisdiction of San Joaquin County.

The San Joaquin County Assessor is the office which deals with the tax-side to property in the county.

=== Other departments ===
The Human Services Agency (HSA) administers multiple California welfare programs within the county, such as Medi-Cal (Medicaid), CalFresh (food stamps), CalWORKs (Temporary Assistance for Needy Families), a Medically Indigent Service Program (MISP), and a Low Income Health Program (Obamacare).

== Law ==
The San Joaquin County Ordinance Code is the codified law of the County in the form of ordinances passed by the Board of Supervisors. Every act prohibited or declared unlawful, and every failure to perform an act required, by the ordinances are misdemeanor crimes, unless otherwise specified as infractions.

== Other governments ==
=== California ===
The San Joaquin Superior Court, which covers the entire county, is not a County department but a division of the State's trial court system. Historically, the courthouses were county-owned buildings that were maintained at county expense, which created significant friction since the trial court judges, as officials of the state government, had to lobby the county Board of Supervisors for facility renovations and upgrades. In turn, the state judiciary successfully persuaded the state Legislature to authorize the transfer of all courthouses to the state government in 2008 and 2009 (so that judges would have direct control over their own courthouses). Courthouse security is still provided by the county government under a contract with the state.

The California Department of Corrections and Rehabilitation operates the Deuel Vocational Institution, a state prison, in unincorporated San Joaquin County, near Tracy.

=== Stockton ===
The Government of Stockton is defined under the Charter of the City of Stockton. It is a council–manager government and consists of the mayor, City Council, and numerous departments and officers under the supervision of the City Manager, such as the Stockton Police Department, Stockton Fire Department, Stockton Public Works Department, and Stockton Economic Development Department. As of January 2021, the current mayor is Kevin Lincoln, and the Councilors were:

- Sol Jobrack — District 1
- Dan Wright — District 2
- Paul Canepa — District 3
- Susan Lenz — District 4
- Christina Fugazi — District 5
- Kimberly Warmsley — District 6

=== School districts ===
San Joaquin County is covered by the San Joaquin Delta Community College District.

=== Special districts ===
The San Joaquin County Local Agency Formation Commission is the Local Agency Formation Commission (LAFCo) for San Joaquin County and regulates most special district and city boundaries.
