= CalWIN =

California welfare administration software system

CalWIN is an online, real-time computer program that supports the administration of welfare in California. These include CalWORKs (TANF), CalFresh (food stamps), Medi-Cal (Medicaid), General Assistance/General Relief, Foster Care, and case management functions for employment services. It facilitates accounting and management reports, interfaces with the California state government, and satisfies the US federal mandate for the Statewide Automated Welfare System (SAWS).

CalWin stands for either California Work Opportunity and Responsibility to Kids Information Network or California Welfare Information Network.

== Management ==
It is managed by the Welfare Client Data System Consortium joint powers authority (WCDS).

== History ==
CalWIN has been used in 18 California counties since 2005. It replaced a legacy system, CDS, which lacked sufficient automation to support tracking of time-on-aid federal requirements. CalWIN, like CDS, was purchased from the IT architecture company Electronic Data Systems (EDS) and was originally developed by Deloitte Consulting. CalWIN's design was driven by federal requirements and regulations, largely as directed by the WCDS Consortium.

== Functionality ==
CalWIN runs eligibility and benefit determinations, case maintenance, application registration, and statistical reporting functions. New client data is entered by the clerical and eligibility staff of county social service agencies. Certain other data is entered by CalWIN Project staff. Despite the goal of automation, CalWIN requires manual interventions to prevent certain erroneous determinations and actions.
