= Medi-Cal Access Program =

The Medi-Cal Access Program (MCAP), formerly known as the Access for Infants and Mothers Program (AIM), is a California policy that grants access to Medi-Cal to pregnant and uninsured (or whose coverage contains a co-pay over $500) mothers who would otherwise not qualify due to exceeding income guidelines. The program covers mothers that make from 200 to 300% of the federal poverty level. In addition, all infants born from mothers enrolled in this program are qualified for the Medi-Cal Access Infant Program.

The program is administered by the California Department of Health Care Services, and is paid for by the state of California and the federal government.

== History and impact ==
AIM was first introduced in 1992, and provided for 3,000-4,000 women annually initially. It is difficult to assess the impact of AIM as it was introduced alongside many other maternal healthcare improvement policies including increasing the eligibility limit for Medi-Cal from 110% to 200% of the federal poverty line, and extending Medi-Cal to undocumented foreign-born women. However, these programs were able to reduce the number of uninsured pregnant mothers from 13.2% in 1989 to under 3% in the mid-1990s.

The AIM program was initially administered by the J.P. Kennedy company of Pasadena, California, under a contract with the State of California. Enrollment, eligibility verification, and payment of benefits was managed by custom software developed by Montgomery Ryland, Inc., a Fountain Valley, CA-based healthcare and health insurance information management company. The software, written in COBOL, was run on an IBM AS/400 midrange computer, and during its first year of service was maintained and enhanced by a single developer/analyst, Jim Rothwell, a former Montgomery-Ryland employee who was later contracted by J.P. Kennedy to provide on-going support for the software system.

== See also ==
- Welfare in California
- Medi-Cal
