= California Healthy Families Program =

The California Healthy Families Program (HFP) was the California implementation of the federal Children's Health Insurance Program (CHIP) that provided low-cost insurance offering health, dental, and vision coverage to children without insurance that did not qualify for Medi-Cal.

As a federal program, it was administered by the U.S. Department of Health and Human Services (HHS), and California Managed Risk Medical Insurance Board (MRMIB) at the state level.

As a result of the 2012–2013 budget deal, nearly 900,000 children will be moved from the HFP into Medi-Cal beginning in 2013.

== See also ==
- Welfare in California
