= Kate Gordon (energy analyst) =

American writer

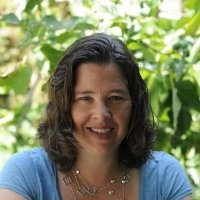
- Born: March 19, 1973 (age 53); Buffalo, New York,
- Partner: Gino Segre
- Website: linkedin.com/in/kate-gordon-b2879

Kate Gordon is an American lawyer, urban planner, non-profit advisor, and leader in the "green jobs" and climate risk movement. In 2021, she became Senior Advisor to Energy Secretary Jennifer Granholm at the United States Department of Energy. In 2019, she was appointed by Governor of California Gavin Newsom to lead the California Governor's Office of Planning and Research.

Before that appointment, Gordon served as an independent consultant and Senior Advisor at the Paulson Institute, where she provides strategic support on issues related to climate change and sustainable economic growth. She is also a nonresident Fellow at the Center on Global Energy Policy at Columbia University and a regular contributor to the Wall Street Journal as one of the paper's “Energy Experts". She currently serves on the non-profit boards of Vote Solar, Center for Carbon Removal, and the American Jobs Project and writes a regular newsletter on clean energy and climate called "Kate's Cliffnotes"

Gordon is a nationally recognized expert on the intersection of clean energy and economic development. Before joining the Paulson Institute, she was the Founding Director of the "Risky Business Project]", co-chaired by NYC Mayor Michael Bloomberg, former U.S. Secretary of the Treasury Hank Paulson, and business leader and philanthropist Tom Steyer, and focused on the economic risks the U.S. faces from unmitigated climate change. The project was founded in October 2013, when the three co-chairs founded a new initiative to assess and publicize the economic risks to the U.S. associated with climate change. The project grew out of concerns by the co-chairs that the U.S. was not developing sound risk assessments to respond to the impacts of a changing climate. In their development of this initiative, the three founders recruited additional members to forge the Project's Risk Committee, which expended to include corporate executives and senior government officials. Gordon took on this project in her role as Senior Vice President for Climate and Energy at Next Generation, a non-partisan think tank based in San Francisco, where she worked on California policy development as well as large-scale national communications and research projects.

Earlier in her career, Gordon served as Vice President of Energy and Environment at the Washington D.C.–based Center for American Progress, where she helped develop and author policy recommendations and Congressional testimony related to the cap and trade negotiations, Deepwater Horizon oil spill, and American Reinvestment and Recovery Act implementation. Prior to CAP, Gordon was a senior associate at the Center on Wisconsin Strategy (COWS), and co-director of the national Apollo Alliance (currently part of the Blue Green Alliance). Before this, she was a consumer rights and employment litigator at the Public Justice Foundation.

Gordon received an undergraduate degree from Wesleyan University. Gordon earned a J.D. and master's degree in city planning from the University of California-Berkeley.

== Notable Public Appearances ==
- Campaigns and Elections magazine named Gordon one of the top fifty "Influencers to watch ahead of the 2014 election cycle."
- Gordon testified before Congress on October 28, 2009, regarding an energy and jobs bill.
- Gordon appeared on The Rachel Maddow Show in 2010 regarding the moratorium on deepwater drilling in the Gulf of Mexico.
- Gordon debated Andrew Morriss, one of the co-authors of The False Promise of Green Energy, at the Cato Institute on April 21, 2011. Morriss argued that having top-down governmental programs manage green energy and green jobs was a flawed concept, driven by misguided economic thinking and bad data. Gordon countered Morriss' assertions with arguments that the data actually shows otherwise: that government programs (versus free market, competitive forces) have generated new jobs and transformed existing jobs and economic forces.
- Gordon participated in an Intelligence Squared debate on March 8, 2016. Gordon and her partner Michael Lind, Co-Founder of the New America Foundation, debated Jack Abramoff, former lobbyist and author of Capitol Punishment, and Zephyr Teachout associate professor at Fordham Law and author of "Corruption in America". The resolution under debate was: "Eliminate Corporate Subsidies." Gordon and Lind won the debate by a large margin.

== Volunteer Boards and Advisory Appointments ==
- Chair, State of California Proposition 39 Citizen Oversight Board (since 2014)
- Contributing Author, Fourth National Climate Assessment, Adaptation chapter (since 2017)
- Member, Board of Directors, American Jobs Project (since 2017)
- Member, Board of Directors, Center for Carbon Removal (since 2016)
- Member, Board of Directors, Vote Solar (since 2014)
- Member, National Advisory Committee, Presidential Climate Action Partnership (since 2016)
- Member, National Working Group, Planning for PK-12 Infrastructure: Adequate Public School Facilities for All Children (since 2016)
- Member, Advisory Board, Climate Advocacy Lab, a project of Skoll Global Threats Fund (since April 2015)

== Selected publications ==
Peer-reviewed journals in bold

- Kate's Cliffnotes (personal blog posts on California and national climate and energy issues, 6000+ subscribers)
- Regular contributor to the Wall Street Journal "Energy Experts" section (since 2013)
- From Risk to Return: Investing in a Clean Energy Economy (Risky Business Project, 2016) (Editor)
- China's Next Opportunity: Sustainable Economic Transition (Paulson Institute, 2015) (with Anders Hove, Merisha
- Enoe)
- Heat in the Heartland: Climate Change and Economic Risk in the Midwest (Risky Business Project, 2015)
- Risky Business: A Climate Risk Assessment for the United States (Risky Business Project, 2014)
- No Californian Left Behind: Clean and Affordable Transportation Options for All through Vehicle Replacement (Risky Business Project, 2014) (with Cole Wheeler, Jesse Morris)
- Climate Change: An Unfunded Mandate (Center for American Progress, 2013) (with Fran Sussman, Cathleen Kelly)
- The Green Industrial Revolution and the United States: In the Clean Energy Race, Is the United States a Leader or a Luddite? (Center for American Progress & Blue Green Alliance, 2013) (with Robert Borosage, Derek Pugh)
- Proposition 39: Investing in California's Future (Next Generation, 2012) (with James Barba)
- Regional Energy, National Solutions: A Real Energy Vision for America (Center for American Progress and Center for Next Generation, 2012) (with Kiley Kroh)
- Preparing America's Workforce for Jobs in the Green Economy: A Case for Technical Literacy (Duke Forum for Law & Social Change Vol. 4:23, 2012) (with Louis Soares, Steven Steigleder)
- The Importance and Promise of American Manufacturing (Center for American Progress (CAP), 2011)
- Rising to the Challenge: A Progressive U.S. Approach to China's Innovation and Competitiveness Policies (CAP 2011)
- Out of the Running? How Germany, Spain, and China Are Seizing the Energy Opportunity and Why the United States Risks Getting Left Behind (CAP 2010)
- The Clean Energy Investment Agenda (CAP 2009)
- New Apollo Program: Clean Energy, Good Jobs – An Economic Strategy for American Prosperity (Apollo Alliance, 2008)
- Green-Collar Jobs in America's Cities (Apollo Alliance, 2008)
- Stronger Corporate Tax Disclosure: Policy Options for Wisconsin (Center on Wisconsin Strategy, 2007)
- "New Energy" Series: New Energy for Cities, New Energy for Campuses, New Energy for States (Apollo Alliance, 2005–2007)
- Biobased Industry in Wisconsin: Briefing Paper (Developed for the Governor's Consortium on Biobased Industry, Dec. 2005)
- Funding Regionally: How Private Foundations Can Set a Regional Planning Agenda (Berkeley Planning Journal Vol. 17, 2004)
- Consumer Arbitration Agreements: Enforceability and Other Topics V.3, V.4 (National Consumer Law Center, 2003, 2004) (with Paul Bland and Michael Quirk)
- Duffield is Dead: The State of Employment Arbitration After Luce, Forward II (2003 California Employment Law Reporter 273, 2003)
- Mandatory Arbitration: Unconscionability Arguments after Howsam and PacifiCare, CAOC Forum, Fall 2003 (with Michael Quirk)
