= Transitional Housing Participant Misconduct Act =

The Transitional Housing Participant Misconduct Act (THPMA) is a state law in the U.S. state of California regulating various elements of transitional housing in the state. It concerns all type of programs which are designed to assist homeless people to live independently in permanent housing. THPMA has its components as meeting requirements from 30 days to 24 months. It shall provide comprehensive social service programs. It also provides temporary housing with structured setting, and rules which participants must follow to remain in the program.

== Contents ==
Transitional Housing Program Operators (THP Operators) are the government agencies or private non-profits receiving money from the program' funds. THP operators are allowed to file a misconduct order in the event of violent or abusive behaviour during the program, whether against another program participant, program employee, or a neighbour of the program site. A court order can be obtained by THP operators to follow the procedure as in "Temporary Restraining Orders" or "permanent orders".

THPMA allows THP operators to circumvent the longer process to legally remove a participant from a transitional housing program. Transitional housing operators are allowed to file restraining orders in order to prevent abuse or enforce misconduct rules. If a resident violates a permanent injunction, the operator can change take measures to remove the resident from the program.

Transitional housing programs have in-house support services, though these services are sometimes misused by tenants or residents. THMPA limits some of these protections, requiring only a partial judicial review in order to obtain a termination or removal order in a transitional housing program. The act preserves certain rights of appeal (California Health and Safety Code §50580)

== Sources ==
- THPMA, California Legal Information website
