= Sonia Y. Angell =

American public health figure

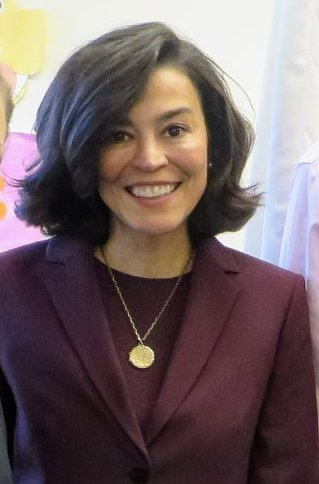
- Angell in 2019

Academic background
- Education: BA, journalism and political science, Indiana University; London School of Hygiene & Tropical Medicine; MPH, University of Michigan; MD, University of California, San Francisco

Academic work
- Institutions: Johns Hopkins Bloomberg School of Public Health; Columbia University Vagelos College of Physicians and Surgeons; California Department of Public Health; New York City Department of Health and Mental Hygiene

Sonia Yris Angell is an American public health figure. She is a Bloomberg Distinguished Professor of the Practice of American Health in the Department of Epidemiology at the Johns Hopkins Bloomberg School of Public Health. Angell also maintains a clinical professorship of medicine in the Columbia University Vagelos College of Physicians and Surgeons. In 2020, after resigning as director of the California Department of Public Health, Angell was elected a Member of the National Academy of Medicine.

== Early life and education ==
Angell attended West Lafayette Junior-Senior High School in West Lafayette, Indiana. She earned a Bachelor of Arts degree in journalism and political science from Indiana University before serving in the Peace Corps. While with the Peace Corps, she became interested in community development and health. Upon returning to North America, Angell received her medical degree in 1999 from the University of California, San Francisco, Diploma from London School of Hygiene & Tropical Medicine, and a Master's in Public Health from the University of Michigan. Angell was one of three members of the UCSF medical school class of 1999 who received the Gold-Headed Cane Award for exhibiting the traits of a true physician.

Angell completed medical training residency in internal medicine, primary care at Brigham and Women's Hospital in Boston, and a health research fellowship in the Robert Wood Johnson Clinical Scholar Program at the University of Michigan.

== Career ==
Angell was a primary care physician at the Packard Community Clinic and assistant attending physician at the New York Presbyterian/Columbia University Hospital. In 2004, she moved to New York and was founding Director of the New York City Department of Health and Mental Hygiene's Cardiovascular Disease Prevention and Control Program. In this role, Angell restricted trans fats in New York City restaurants and set new food nutrition procurement standards for New York City government agencies. She subsequently moved to the Centers for Disease Control and Prevention in 2011 and established the Global Noncommunicable Disease Unit. In this position she worked with the World Health Organization (WHO) and other global partners to help prevent and control non-infectious diseases, such as heart disease, cancer, diabetes and chronic lung diseases and their risk factors. In 2014, Angell returned to New York City Department of Health to serve as Deputy Commissioner overseeing the Division of Prevention and Primary Care. Two years later, Angell was named to the second class of Aspen Institute's Health Innovators Fellowship.

Angell was appointed the Director of the California Department of Public Health on September 13, 2019, the first Latina in this role. She was responsible for coordinating the initial phase of the state's COVID-19 pandemic response, which included attempts to focus a greater share of resources in areas of the state with majority African American and/or Hispanic populations. She served until August 9, 2020. Governor Gavin Newsom indicated Angell's resignation was related to data issues with the California Reportable Disease Information Exchange system that resulted in nearly 300,000 backlogged COVID-19 test results.

In March 2023, Angell was appointed a Bloomberg Distinguished Professor of the Practice of American Health in the Department of Epidemiology at the Johns Hopkins Bloomberg School of Public Health. In this role, she also chairs the Bloomberg American Health Initiative’s steering committee on Food Systems for Health.

== Awards and honors ==
In October 2020, Angell was elected a Member of the National Academy of Medicine for "her leadership in the nation’s first municipal regulation to ban transfat, launching national coalitions to reduce sodium and sugar in our food supply, working globally to improve control of hypertension, and for global leadership in modeling environmental change to sustainably reduce risk and save lives." Angell was also the recipient of the American Heart Association’s 2020 Chairman's Award.
