= California Major Risk Medical Insurance Program =

State Insurance Program

- Abbreviation: MRMIP
- Location: California

The California Major Risk Medical Insurance Program (MRMIP) is a program of the Managed Risk Medical Insurance Board that provides health insurance for Californian citizens who are unable to obtain coverage in the individual health insurance market because of their pre-existing conditions. Californians qualifying for the program, participate in the cost of their coverage by paying premiums. The State of California supplements those premiums to cover the cost of care in MRMIP. Tobacco tax funds currently subsidize the MRMIP.
