= California Managed Risk Medical Insurance Board =

The Managed Risk Medical Insurance Board (MRMIB) of California, which ended January 1, 2025, per California Senate Bill 159, was a component of the California Health and Human Services Agency. Programs administered by the Board included the following:

- the California Major Risk Medical Insurance Program;
- the California Healthy Families Program;
- the Access for Infants and Mothers Program (AIM) which provides comprehensive coverage for children who do not have employer-sponsored insurance and do not qualify for no-cost Medi-Cal.

Functions of the MRMIB were transferred to the California Department of Health Care Service.
