= San Gabriel and Lower Los Angeles Rivers and Mountains Conservancy =

Government agency in California

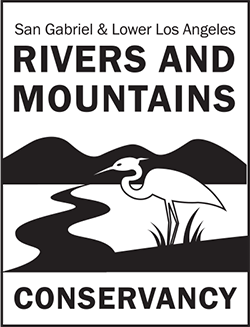

Agency overview
- Formed: 1999
- Headquarters: 'El Encanto' – 100 N. Old San Gabriel Canyon Rd., Azusa, CA 91702
- Agency executive: Mark Stanley, Executive Officer
- Parent agency: California Natural Resources Agency
- Website: rmc.ca.gov

The San Gabriel and Lower Los Angeles Rivers and Mountains Conservancy (RMC) is an agency of the State of California in the United States with the mission of preserving open space and habitat for low-impact recreation and educational uses, wildlife habitat restoration and protection, and watershed improvements within its jurisdiction. The conservancy was created by the state legislature in 1999, and is headquartered in Azusa. It is 1 of 10 conservancies within the California Natural Resources Agency. At the time of its founding, it was the state's first conservancy to primarily serve an urban area.

The RMC is a member of 2 joint powers authorities, the Watershed Conservation Authority (RMC and Los Angeles County Flood Control District) and the Los Cerritos Wetlands Authority (RMC, State Coastal Conservancy, City of Long Beach, City of Seal Beach)

== Territory ==
The agency’s jurisdiction contains 79 cities in Orange and Los Angeles Counties, encompassing all or part of the Angeles National Forest, Santa Catalina Island, the Lower Los Angeles River, Santa Ana River, Santa Clara River, and Dominguez Channel watersheds. As an urban conservancy, its territory includes 4.8 million residents, of which, 1.86 million are considered to live in disadvantaged or severely disadvantaged communities, per the State of California’s definition.

== Governing board ==
The RMC is governed by a 15 voting and 9 non-voting member board.

Voting Members:

- One member of the Los Angeles County Board of Supervisors
- Two members of the board of directors of the San Gabriel Valley Council of Governments
- Two members of the board of directors of the Gateway Cities Council of Governments
- Two members of the Orange County Division of the League of California Cities
- One representative of the San Gabriel Valley Water Association
- One member of the Central Basin Water Association
- One resident of Los Angeles County appointed by the Governor
- The Secretary of the California Natural Resources Agency
- The Secretary of the California Environmental Protection Agency
- The Director of the State of California Department of Finance
- One resident of a city bordering the Lower Los Angeles River appointed by the Governor
- One resident of a city bordering the San Gabriel River appointed by the Governor

Non-Voting Members:

- The District Engineer of the United States Army Corps of Engineers
- The Regional Forester for the Pacific Southwest Region of the United States Forest Service
- The Director of the Los Angeles County Department of Public Works
- The Director of the Orange County Public Works Department
- A member of the San Gabriel River Watermaster, appointed by a majority of the members of the San Gabriel Watermaster
- The Director of the State of California Department of Parks and Recreation
- The Executive Director of the Wildlife Conservation Board
- Member of the California State Senate appointed by the Senate Committee on Rules
- Member of the California Assembly appointed by the Speaker of the Assembly

== Grants ==
Municipal and county governments, school districts, non-profit organizations, mutual water companies, and tribal organizations are eligible to apply for RMC funding. Eligible project types include project development and planning, as well as project implementation and construction. Examples include habitat restoration, new parks and open space in park poor communities, creation or expansion of urban tree canopy, green infrastructure and urban greening, and the increase of access points and trails within natural areas.

== Notable Projects ==
- Maywood Riverfront Park
- Parque Dos Rios
- Hollydale Park Enhancements
- Urban Orchard
- SELA Cultural Center
- Dominguez Gap Wetlands Project
- Rancho Los Cerritos
- Wrigley Greenbelt
- Long Beach Municipal Urban Stormwater Treatment Project (LB MUST)

== See also ==
- List of California state agencies
- Los Angeles River
- San Gabriel River
- Ecology of California
