= Scholarshare Investment Board =

The ScholarShare Investment Board is a body established by the State of California to set the investment policies of, and oversee all the activities of, ScholarShare, the state’s 529 college investment plan, as well as the Governor’s Scholarship Programs and also the California Memorial Scholarship Program.

== Scholarshare ==
The Scholarshare program enables Californians to save money for college education by investing funds in Government approved investments, in which investment earnings are permitted to grow tax-deferred. Disbursements, as long as they are used for tuition and other education-related expenses, are made free of federal and state tax. The ScholarShare Plan is managed by TIAA-CREF Tuition Financing, Inc.

== Board membership ==
The board has seven members, including State Treasurer Fiona Ma.
