= Colorado River Board of California =

California state agency

Agency overview
- Formed: 1937
- Headquarters: Glendale, California
- Employees: 13
- Annual budget: $2,840,000 (FY2024-25)
- Agency executive: Jessica Neuwerth, Acting Executive Director
- Parent agency: California Natural Resources Agency
- Website: crb.ca.gov

The Colorado River Board of California is a state agency in the U.S. state of California that represents California in discussions and negotiations regarding the Colorado River and its management.

The Colorado River Board of California's mission is "To protect the interests and rights of the state of California, its agencies, and citizens, in the water and power resources of the Colorado River". Its current agenda can be found on its website.

== History ==
The Colorado River Board of California (CRB) was established in 1937 by state statute. Administratively it falls under the California Natural Resources Agency.

== Membership ==
The CRB consists of eight members appointed by the Governor: representatives of the six California local water agencies that originally held Colorado River water rights, two public members, as well as the Director of Water Resources and the Director of Fish and Game or their designees. The six local water agencies are: Palo Verde Irrigation District, Imperial Irrigation District, Coachella Valley Water District, Metropolitan Water District of Southern California, San Diego County Water Authority, and the Los Angeles Department of Water and Power.

The Governor appoints the six agency representatives as follows:

The governing bodies of the San Diego County Water Authority, Palo Verde Irrigation District, Imperial Irrigation District, Coachella Valley Water District, the Metropolitan Water District of Southern California, and the Department of Water and Power of the City of Los Angeles shall each submit to the Governor two lists of not less than three persons on each with a recommendation as to whom should be appointed from one list as its member on the board and from the other list as its alternate on the board. The Governor shall appoint each agency's member and alternate from the designated lists. If, after 60 days following submission of the initial or any new list, the Governor has not made an appointment, the person recommended by the governing body shall be deemed appointed. Each governing body if it desires to have a new member or alternate, or both, may submit new lists at any time. A member of the governing body of an agency may be appointed as a member of the board or as an alternate. Each alternate shall, in the absence of the appointed member for any cause, including vacancy in the office of the appointed member, have all the authority and rights of the member to which he or she is an alternate.

— California Water Code Section 12512

== Activities ==
The CRB works with: the six local California water agencies, the Colorado River Basin states (Arizona, California, Colorado, Nevada, New Mexico, Utah, and Wyoming), federal agencies, other state agencies, Congress, and the courts. Activities include analyses of engineering, legal and economic matters concerning the Colorado River resources of the seven basin states and the 1944 United States-Mexico Water Treaty obligation to deliver Colorado River water to Mexico.

== Budget ==
The CRB is currently funded 100% by reimbursements from the six agencies.
