= California Health and Human Services Agency =

California state government agency

Agency overview
- Jurisdiction: California
- Headquarters: 1600 Ninth Street; Sacramento, CA 95814; 38.57384°N 121.49800°W
- Employees: 33,000
- Annual budget: US$ 88.2 billion (2011)
- Agency executive: Mark Ghaly, Secretary
- Website: chhs.ca.gov

The California Health and Human Services Agency (CHHS) is the state agency tasked with administration and oversight of "state and federal programs for health care, social services, public assistance and rehabilitation" in the U.S. state of California. The agency is headed by the Secretary of the California Health and Human Services Agency, with headquarters in Sacramento. Many of the laws in the California Health and Safety Code are enforced by CHHS components.

On March 6, 2019, Governor Gavin Newsom nominated Mark Ghaly to be Secretary of CHHS. The California State Senate unanimously confirmed Ghaly on June 17, 2019. Ghaly previously served as the director of health and social impact for Los Angeles County, deputy director of the Los Angeles County Department of Health Services, and medical director of the San Francisco Department of Public Health’s Southeast Health Center. Ghaly earned his doctorate of medicine degree from Harvard Medical School and a master of public health degree from the Harvard T.H. Chan School of Public Health.

CHHS was created from a reorganization of other California agencies, including the California Health and Welfare Agency which included the California Department of Health Services.

== Organization ==
The agency is divided into various departments and boards:

- California Department of Aging
- California Department of Child Support Services
- California Department of Community Services and Development
- California Department of Developmental Services
- California Emergency Medical Services Authority
- California Department of Health Care Access and Information
- California Department of Health Care Services
- California Department of Managed Health Care
- California Managed Risk Medical Insurance Board
- California Department of Public Health
- California Department of Rehabilitation
- California Department of Social Services
- California Department of State Hospitals
  - CONREP
- California Office of Health Information Integrity (CalOHII)
- California Office of Law Enforcement Support
- California Office of the Patient Advocate - originally created in 2000, it conducts consumer education, provides quality of care scorecards, and reports on consumer questions and complaints
- California Office of Systems Integration
- Office of the California Surgeon General

== Secretaries ==
- Winslow Christian (1963-1964)
- John A. Svahn
- Spencer Williams (1967-1968)
- Lucian Vandegrift (1968-1970)
- James M. Hall (1971-1972)
- Earl Brian (1972-1974)
- James E. Jenkins (1974-1975)
- Mario G. Obledo (1975-1981)
- Douglas X. Patiño (1982)
- David Swoap (1983-1985)
- James Stockdale (1985-1987)
- Cliff Allenby (1987-1991)
- Russell Gould (1991-1993)
- Sandra Smoley (1993-1999)
- Grantland L Johnson (1999-2003)
- S. Kimberly Belshé (2003-2011)
- Diana Dooly (2011-2018)
- Michael Wilkening (2018-2019)
- Mark Ghaly (2019-2024)
- Kim Johnson (2024-present)

== History ==
The agency was originally created in 1961 by Government Code section 12800 as the Human Relations Agency, and renamed to the Health and Welfare Agency in 1972 to and again to its current name in 1998.
