= California Department of Community Services and Development =

The California Department of Community Services and Development (CSD) is a department within the California Health and Human Services Agency which is tasked with providing economic assistance. It was created in 1964 as the State Office of Economic Opportunity in response to the passage of the federal Economic Opportunity Act of 1964. The office was renamed as the Department of Community Services and Development in 1996.

CSD distributes the state's portion of the Community Services Block Grant, Low Income Home Energy Assistance Program, and Department of Energy Weatherization Assistance Program. The CSD also distributes the state's Low-Income Weatherization Program, which is intended to reduce greenhouse gas emissions in lower-income neighborhoods.
