= California Acupuncture Board =

American government agency

- Official Seal

- Official logo

Board overview
- Formed: January 1, 1999
- Preceding agencies: Acupuncture Advisory Committee; Acupuncture Examining Committee
- Type: Regulatory Board
- Jurisdiction: California
- Headquarters: 1625 North Market Blvd., Suite N-219 Sacramento, California
- Employees: 12 (2024)
- Annual budget: $3.8 million (2024)
- Board executives: John C. Harabedian, Board President; Yong Ping Chen, Board Vice President
- Parent board: California Department of Consumer Affairs
- Child agencies: Licensing Committee; Executive and Legislative Committee; Enforcement Committee
- Key document: Laws and Regulations Relating to the Practice of Acupuncture
- Website: acupuncture.ca.gov

The California Acupuncture Board is a regulatory body under the California Department of Consumer Affairs. The board is responsible for the regulation of the practice of Asian medicine across the state. They are the sole issuer of acupuncture licenses and regulate all 12,185 active licensed acupuncturists in California.

== History ==
California began regulating acupuncture in 1972 under the jurisdiction of the Board of Medical Examiners. In 1975, Senate Bill 86 established the Acupuncture Advisory Committee. It allowed patients to seek acupuncture practices with the referral of a licensed physician, chiropractor, or dentist. In 1976, California became the 8th state to license acupuncturists. In 1978, referral requirements were eliminated.

The board was abolished in 1980 and replaced with the Acupuncture Examining Committee within the Division of Allied Health Professions, having limited autonomous authority. The state expanded the definition of acupuncture to include electroacupuncture, cupping, and moxibustion and added Asian massages, exercises, and nutritional herbs within the scope of acupuncture practices. The Acupuncture Examining Committee Fund was also established, allowing the board to operate independently of the Medical Board's fund.

In 1982, the board was designated an autonomous body. Acupuncturists were included as physicians within the Workers' Compensation System in 1989. On January 1, 1990, the board was renamed the Acupuncture Committee via AB 2367, Chapter, 1249, Statutes of 1989, before being renamed again on January 1, 1999, to the California Acupuncture Board under SB 1980, Chapter 991, Statutes of 1998 and was removed from the jurisdiction of the Medical Board of California under SB 1981, Chapter 736, Statutes of 1998, becoming an autonomous body under the California Department of Consumer Affairs.

== Functions ==
The board conducts four meetings per year, with a quorum of four members, one of which must be a licensed member. Additional meetings are hosted as needed. They are responsible for policy direction, decision-making, and administering the Acupuncture Licensure Act. The board contains six specialized units: licensing, examination, education, enforcement, administrative, and policy units.

== Board ==
The seven-member board, established in 2006 via SB 248, Chapter 659, is composed of four public members who do not hold a license or certificate as a physician, surgeon, or acupuncturist and three licensed members with at least five years of experience in acupuncture. The governor appoints three licensed members and two public members, the speaker of the Assembly appoints one public member, and the Senate Rules Committee appoints one public member. Each member of the Board is appointed for a term of four years. The California Acupuncture Board is currently made up of the following members:

- John C. Harabedian, Governor Appointee, Board President
- Yong Ping Chen, Ph.D., Governor Appointee, Board Vice President
- Hyun “Francisco” Kim, L.Ac., Governor Appointee
- Shu Dong Li, Ph.D., Assembly Appointee
- Dr. Amy Matecki, MD, L.Ac., Governor Appointee
- Ruben A. Osorio, Senate Appointee
- Gregory Leung, Governor Appointee
