= Conditional Release Program =

The forensic Conditional Release Program (CONREP) is the California Department of State Hospitals' statewide system of community-based services for specified forensic patients. It was mandated as a state responsibility by the Governor's Mental Health Initiative of 1984 and began operations on January 1, 1986.

== Details ==
CONREP patients are typically young males (77% are 18–44 years old) with severe mental disorders (66%) who have committed violent felonies (85%). Common ways for offenders to be placed in CONREP include:

- Mentally disordered offenders can be placed in CONREP by the Board of Prison Terms instead of the court.
- Offenders found "not guilty by reason of insanity" can be placed in CONREP by filing a petition for restoration of sanity and winning at the hearing.
- Offenders found "not guilty by reason of insanity" or "incompetent to stand trial" because of a serious felony must spend six months in a state mental hospital before transfer to CONREP.

Prisoners can only be transferred to CONREP after being deemed no longer dangerous and released to outpatient status.

== Difficulties ==
CONREP programs have been under investigation by a variety of federal and state agencies for abuse of its patients, including food and housing problems, and falsifying of legal documents.

The average patient may be in the CONREP program for 20 years, or even for the rest of their lives.

The program has recently been in the news for its treatment of convicted multiple sex offenders.
