= California Governor's Office of Land Use and Climate Innovation =

California state government agency

The California Governor's Office of Land Use and Climate Innovation, also known as LCI or Cal LCI, is the long-range planning and research agency of the government of California, and reports to the Governor of California. It was created by statute in 1970 and is part of the office of the Governor of California. Under Governor Jerry Brown, its director was Ken Alex. In 2019, incoming governor Gavin Newsom appointed Kate Gordon to lead the office. The current director is Samuel Assefa.

The office's name changed in July 2024. It was formerly called the Governor's Office of Planning and Research (OPR or Cal OPR).

A major focus of the organization is helping the State of California mitigate and adapt to global warming. This includes promoting the use of public transit, and coordinating land use to maximize the benefits of public transit.

Its purview includes

- Formulation of long-range land use goals and policies
- Conflict resolution among state agencies
- Coordination of federal grants for environmental goals
- Coordination of statewide environmental monitoring
- Coordination of research on growth and development
- Management of state planning grants, and encouragement of local and regional planning
- Creation and adoption of General Plan Guidelines
- Drafting of guidelines for compliance with the California Environmental Quality Act (CEQA)
- Creation of a State Environmental Goals and Policy Report, every four years
- Operation of the State Clearinghouse for distribution and review of CEQA documents
- Operation of the Integrated climate change adaptation and Resiliency Program
- Coordination of environmental justice activities
- Coordination with US military for land use and other issues in the state
