= SAFE-BIDCO =

State Assistance for Enterprise, Business and Industrial Development Corp
- Trade name: SAFE-BIDCO
- Company type: Non-depository lender
- Industry: Financial services
- Founded: 1981; 45 years ago
- Founder: California State Legislature
- Defunct: September 18, 2017
- Fate: Seized and liquidated
- Headquarters: Santa Rosa, United States
- Area served: California
- Key people: Mary Jo Dutra (CEO, noted in reports)
- Products: Small business loans, state loan guarantees
- Services: Financing for alternative energy equipment, farm loans
- Owner: State of California

State Assistance for Enterprise, Business and Industrial Development Corp, better known as SAFE-BIDCO, was a United States non-depository lender set up by the California State Legislature for financing of small business loans in California. SAFE-BIDCO was based in Santa Rosa, California until its closure in September, 2017.

== History ==
SAFE-BIDCO was established in 1981 to provide loans to small businesses for the purpose of manufacturing or purchasing alternative energy equipment.

In 1986 its mandate was expanded to include non-energy-related loans to minority owned small businesses or exporting companies.

In 1997, the organization expanded its mandate to serve State Loan Guarantees to Northern California. In 2011, SAFE-BIDCO was authorized to use state loan guarantee trust fund capital to help secure farm loans, guaranteed by the USDA.

In April, 2017, the State Auditor released a report warning SAFE-BIDCO was at high risk of insolvency. The report also noted, "Despite its declining financial position, SAFE-BIDCO has imprudently spent its limited funds on questionable items such as continuing with a business development contractor that did not meet his performance milestones for several years. Additionally, during fiscal years 2011–12 through 2015–16, SAFE-BIDCO's chief executive officer Mary Jo Dutra made 16 out-of-state trips and one international trip to Ireland."

On September 15, 2017, the state Department of Business Oversight ordered the seizure of SAFE-BIDCO, announced plans to liquidate the state-chartered nonprofit, and appointed Robb Evans as Special Commissioner.

On September 18, 2017, the state Department of Business Oversight seized SAFE-BIDCO.
