= California Emergency Medical Services Authority =

California State government agency

California Emergency Medical Services Authority (EMSA)
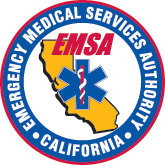

Agency overview
- Formed: 1981
- Jurisdiction: California
- Headquarters: 11120 International Drive Rancho Cordova, California 95670; 38.592448°N 121.27941°W
- Employees: 80
- Annual budget: $36 million in 2025
- Agency executive: Elizabeth Basnett, Director
- Website: www.emsa.ca.gov

The California Emergency Medical Services Authority (EMSA or EMS Authority) is an agency of California State government. The California EMS Authority is one of the thirteen departments within the California Health and Human Services Agency. The director is required to be a physician with substantial experience in emergency medicine. Elizabeth Basnett is the current Acting Director.

The mission of the California EMS Authority is to ensure quality patient care by administering an effective, statewide system of coordinated emergency medical care, injury prevention, and disaster medical response.

In California, the EMS Authority is responsible for paramedic licensure, emergency medical technician regulations, trauma center and trauma system standards, ambulance service coordination, and disaster medical response.

The EMS Authority operates the EMS Central Registry, a public access database that provides information about licensing and certification status of EMTs and paramedics.

The EMS Authority manages the state's medical response to major disasters. This includes maintenance, staffing and deployment of three 200-bed mobile field hospitals, 39 Disaster Medical Support Units that supply ambulance strike teams, and three 40-person medical assistance teams that are prepared to respond to a disaster.

Disaster Healthcare Volunteers is California's initiative to pre-register, verify licensure and credentials, and mobilize professional healthcare volunteers. The program has roughly 14,000 registrants representing 47 professional license types including doctors, dentists, nurses, paramedics, pharmacists, technicians, etc.

== History and background ==
Paramedic programs were established as a county option in California in 1971 by the Wedworth-Townsend Pilot Paramedic Act (SB 772). Los Angeles County became the first county in California with paramedics. The popular television show Emergency! demonstrated the potential for improved pre-hospital care. Paramedic programs began to be established in many counties in California.

Before 1980, the responsibility for emergency medical services (EMS) and disaster medical preparedness was spread among a variety of state departments. It became clear that a more unified approach to emergency and disaster medical services was needed. The Emergency Medical Services System and Prehospital Emergency Medical Care Personnel Act (California Health and Safety Code sections 1797 et seq.) created the Emergency Medical Services Authority in 1980. This legislation (SB 125) was the culmination of several years of effort by local administrators, health care providers, consumer groups, and legislators to establish a state lead agency and centralized resource to deal with emergency and disaster medical services.

== Role ==
The EMS Authority is charged with providing leadership in developing and implementing Emergency Medical Services (EMS) systems throughout California. In California, day-to-day EMS system management is a local responsibility. Each county developing an EMS system must designate a local EMS agency (LEMSA) which can be the county health department, an agency established and operated by the county, an entity with which the county contracts for the purposes of EMS administration or a joint powers agency. There are 34 single-county or multi-county local EMS agencies. It is principally through these agencies that the EMS Authority works to promote quality EMS services statewide.

== Directors ==
- Roger Taylor, MD (1981-1982)
- George Moorhead (Acting, 1982–1983)
- Kenneth Kizer, MD (1983-1984)
- George Moorhead (Acting, 1984–1986)
- Bruce Haynes, MD (1986-1989)
- Daniel Smiley (Acting, 1989–1993)
- Joseph Morales, MD (1993-1997)
- Richard Watson (Acting, 1997–2005)
- Cesar Aristeiguieta, MD (2005-2007)
- Daniel Smiley (Acting 2007–2008)
- R. Steven Tharratt, MD (2008-2010)
- Daniel Smiley (Acting 2010–2011)
- Howard Backer, MD (2011-2019)
- Julie Souliere (Acting 2019)
- Dave Duncan, MD (2019-2021)
- Elizabeth Basnett (2021–present
