= California Health and Safety Code =

U.S. state law

The California Health and Safety Code is the codification of general statutory law covering the subject areas of health and safety in the state of California. It is one of the 29 California Codes and was originally signed into law by the Governor of California on April 7, 1939.

== Notable laws ==
The code contains various laws, including:

=== Healthcare ===
- In Division 2, licensing of healthcare providers and facilities
- a pharmaceutical surplus program, first passed in 2005 and expanded in 2012 and 2016; although as of 2018, 38 states had laws for such programs, in over a dozen states these were nonoperational. As of 2018, California had an operational program and in 2016 a nonprofit surplus pharmacy opened
- a ban on copay coupon discounts when an equivalent generic is available for cheaper, passed in 2017 and subject to various exceptions
- Division 107, Chapter 2.5 contains a "charity care" law for fair hospital pricing
- California End of Life Option Act in Division 1. Section 443 - 443.22
- laws regarding vaccine exemptions, including in 2015 California Senate Bill 277, which removed a personal belief exemption to vaccines for children public schools, and in 2019 SB 276, which further limited exemptions
- AB 315 (2018) which regulates pharmacy benefit management
- establishing various agencies under the California Health and Human Services Agency, although the top agency itself is created by Government Code section 12800

==== Health insurance ====
- In Division 2, the Knox-Keene Health Care Service Plan Act of 1975 in Division 2. Chapter 2.2., 1340 - 1399.864, which is enforced by the California Department of Managed Health Care and regulates most health insurance in California, although some plans are regulated by the California Department of Insurance (CDI) with sometimes similar "companion" statutes in the California Insurance Code. Within this section are various laws affecting transparency and mandated benefits for health insurance plans, which are part of a broader movement among states including:
  1. a standard formulary jointly developed with the CDI which was passed in 2014
  2. for prescription prior authorization, SB 866 passed in 2011 mandated a standardization of forms jointly developed with CDI which became effective by 2015 with Form 61-211; this was further amended by SB 282 in 2016 which allowed prescribers flexibility to use other methods such as the SCRIPT system
  3. a limit to prescription drug cost-sharing first passed as AB 339 in 2015 and then extended by SB 1021 in 2018
  4. like all states, California mandates coverage for certain benefits, which are related but distinct from the essential health benefits mandated by the PPACA; these mandates are reviewed by the California Health Benefits Review Program which advises the legislature on proposed mandates
- laws regarding cost transparency include an all-payer claims database (AB 1810) with possible explorations into single payer as well as cost transparency on prescription drugs

=== Environmental ===
- establishes in Division 26 the California Air Resources Board, an agency under the California Environmental Protection Agency
- in Division 37, sets various environmental protection laws; in addition, Division 104 includes various environmental health laws
- Division 20, Chapter 6.6 contains 1986 California Proposition 65, The Safe Drinking Water and Toxic Enforcement Act of 1986
- Global Warming Solutions Act of 2006, although global warming related provisions appear in various areas, e.g. state agency report card mandates in Government Code section 12890 - 12893
- some major environmental laws are outside the code, including the California Environmental Quality Act which is codified in California Public Resources Code § 21000 et seq

=== Safety ===
- In Division 104 Environmental Health, safety laws including
  - Part 3 Product Safety
    - Chapter 5 Consumer Products, including water heaters and toys
    - Various laws on poisons and toxins
  - Part 10 Recreational Safety, including the Swimming Pool Act originally passed in 1996 and amended in the years since
  - Part 13 Garbage and Onsite Waste Disposal

=== Sanitation and waste management ===
Division 5 is entitled Sanitation; however, in 1989, California Integrated Waste Management Act (IWMA) of 1989 moved much of the waste management law into the California Public Resources Code

=== Other ===
- the Sexual Health Education Accountability Act passed in 2008, complementing laws in the California Education Code regarding sex education, which began with HIV prevention in 1990s followed by California Comprehensive Sexual Health and HIV/AIDS Prevention Education Act in 2003
- Transitional Housing Participant Misconduct Act

== Division 2 licensing ==
Division 2 contains licensing requirements for a variety of healthcare facilities. Physicians are licensed by the Medical Board of California.

Chapter 2 enumerates 13 types of facilities in Section 1250.1 including hospitals, skilled nursing, and hospice; these are generally regulated by the Licensing and Certification Division of the California Department of Public Health.

Outpatient ambulatory surgery center facility licensing per Chapter 1 can vary, with three options: (1) Medicare certification and regulation by the Licensing and Certification Division of the California Department of Public Health; (2) accreditation by one of five different accrediting agencies and oversight by the Medical Board of California; or (3) state licensure, which is uncommon.

The California Adult Day Health Care Act of 1977 in Division 2, Chapter 3.3 which created a system to provide healthcare during the day without committing to a nursing home has been cited as a model for the nation.

Chapter 5 regulates the use of animals for research with a 1951 law, in practice, as of 2017 many laboratories are exempt from state law due to receiving federal funds or USDA regulation.

=== Complaints and investigations ===
The grantor of licenses, which in the case of many facilities is the California Department of Public Health, is responsible for investigating complaints and issuing fines. It has been criticized for lack of investigations and limited fines. In 2014, lawmakers held a hearing after investigative reporters raised concerns. Cases from 2001 were reportedly still open as of 2014.

== See also ==
- Law of California
