= California Department of Social Services =

California state agency

Department of Social Services
Agency overview
- Jurisdiction: California
- Annual budget: US$ 19.7 billion (2011)
- Agency executive: Jennifer Troia, Director
- Parent agency: California Health and Human Services Agency
- Website: www.cdss.ca.gov

The California Department of Social Services (CDSS) is a California state agency for many of the programs defined as part of the social safety net in the United States, and is within the auspices of the California Health and Human Services Agency. Federal and State funds for adoptions, the largest SNAP program in the country (known as CalFresh, formerly led by current Department of Aging Director Kim McCoy Wade), CalWORKs program, foster care, aid for people with disabilities, family crisis counseling, subsistence payments to poor families with children, child welfare services and many other efforts are distributed through this department.

On June 27, 2019, Governor Gavin Newsom appointed Kimberley Johnson as CDSS Director. Johnson previously served in other capacities at CDSS, including as deputy director of the Family Engagement and Empowerment Division, branch chief of CalWorks and Child Care, and branch chief of Child Care and Refugee Programs.

Its mission is "to serve, aid and protect the needy and vulnerable children and adults in ways that strengthen and preserve families, encourage personal responsibility, and foster independence."

== Responsibilities ==
CDSS has more than 4,000 employees in 54 offices throughout the state and is responsible for:

- CalWORKs, the Temporary Assistance for Needy Families (TANF) welfare-to-work program
- CalFresh is the California implementation of the federal Supplemental Nutrition Assistance Program (SNAP), formerly known as the Food Stamp program, which provides financial assistance for purchasing food for those in Poverty in California
- Ensuring efficient, accurate and equitable delivery of payments and benefits
- Providing services that foster self-sufficiency and dignity
- Providing social services to the elderly, blind, disabled and other children and adults
- Licensing and regulating foster homes, group homes, residential care facilities, day care facilities, child care facilities and preschools
- Evaluating eligibility of applicants for disability-related benefits for certain federal and state programs, including Supplemental Security Income, Social Security Disability and Medi-Cal

== Organization ==
The Department of Social Services is divided into 10 divisions, with programs, branches, and agencies under those divisions:

- Administration
- Legal
- Children and Family Services
- Community Care Licensing
- Disability Determination Service
- Adult Programs
- Family Engagement and Empowerment
- State Hearings
- Information Systems
- Housing and Homelessness

== Evolution of Budget and Equality Issues ==
In an analysis of the Department of Social Services Budget, Governor Newsom targeted CalWORKs, In-Home Supportive Services, and Continuum of Care Reform during the period of 2019-2020. The budget included $5.3 billion for CalWORKs, $412.7 billion for IHSS, $9.9 billion for the SSI/SSP program, and $271 million for CCR. In continuance of the 2023-2024 budget, The Department of Social Services saw a change in their budgeting with a $6.1 billion fund for the Department of Healthcare Services . While funding has continued to evolve around the Department of Social Services, many have reported issues with accessing such resources. Through research conducted by the National Library of Medicine, common issues reported by the general public included limited availability of necessary resources, limited accessibility of necessary resources, strict program criteria, complicated application processes, stigma associated with necessary resources, lack of fluency in English/access to interpreters, and immigration status and legal policies.

== Impact and Scope ==
The California Department of Social Services aims to ensure the well being of low income individuals. Such research conducted by California State Monterey Bay detailed that low income populations including disadvantage families with dependents in the country are significant with around 31 million American citizens being uninsured in 2020. The Department of Social Services aims to target prevention and spreading access of such resources. Much of the way The California Department of Social Services targets low-income individual and families was through managed care plans. Research conducted by the National Library of Medicine displayed that "nearly 10 million Californians are receiving full-scope medi-Cal services from MCPs". In research conducted by UC Davis Department of Sociology across California Counties from 1995-2015 showed a positive relationship that welfare resources provided by the state that welfare programs could be a form of state control to targeting mass incarceration.
