= California Department of Health Care Services =

Agency in California

Agency overview
- Jurisdiction: California
- Headquarters: Sacramento, California
- Annual budget: US$ 100 billion (2021-22)
- Agency executive: Michelle Baass, Director (effective September 10, 2021)
- Parent agency: California Health and Human Services Agency
- Website: www.dhcs.ca.gov

The California Department of Health Care Services (DHCS) is a department within the California Health and Human Services Agency that finances and administers a number of individual health care service delivery programs, including Medi-Cal, which provides health care services to low-income people. It was formerly known as the California Department of Health Services, which was reorganized in 2007 into the DHCS and the California Department of Public Health. On September 10, 2019, DHCS Director Jennifer Kent announced her resignation, effective September 30, 2019. On September 25, 2019, Governor Gavin Newsom appointed Richard Figueroa, Jr. as Acting Director. Will Lightbourne was appointed by Governor Gavin Newsom and began serving as Director on June 16, 2020. Subsequently, Michelle Baass was appointed Director of DHCS by Governor Gavin Newsom on September 10, 2021, replacing the outgoing Will Lightbourne.

== Operations ==
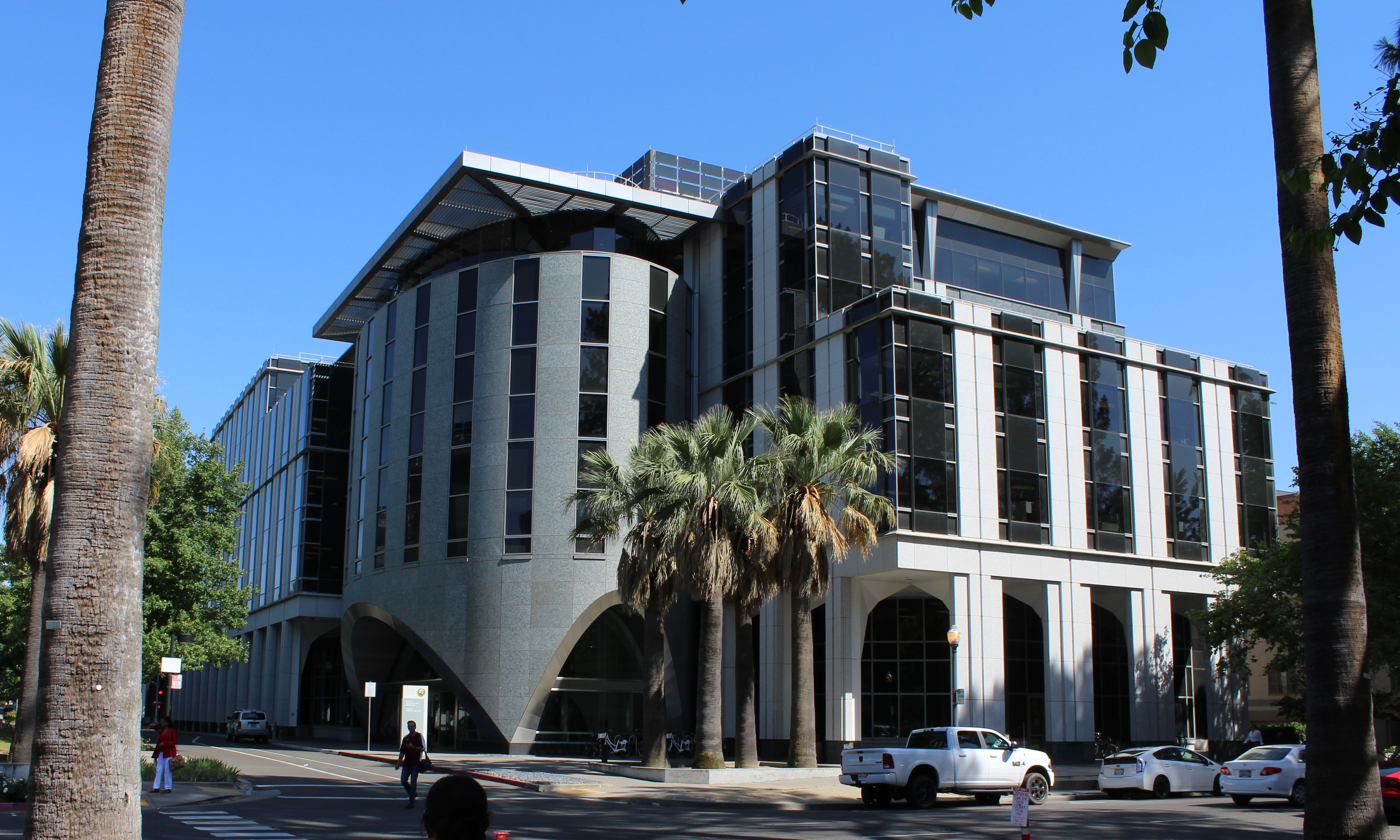
A building occupied by the California Department of Health Care Services.

A December 2014 audit of the DHCS's Medi-Cal dental care program (Denti-Cal) by the California State Auditor reported that:

- "Information shortcomings and ineffective actions" by DHCS are putting child beneficiaries at higher risk of dental disease.
- Only 43.9 percent of children enrolled in Denti-Cal had seen a dentist the previous year – the 12th worst among states that submitted data.
- Reimbursement rates for the 10 most common dental procedures were 35 percent of the national average – and haven’t risen since the 2000-2001 budget year.
- Eleven California counties had no Denti-Cal providers or no providers willing to accept new child patients covered by Denti-Cal: Del Norte, Tehama, Yuba, Sierra, Nevada, Amador, Calaveras, Alpine, Mariposa, Mono and Inyo counties.
- California might not have enough Denti-Cal-participating dentists to handle millions of new Denti-Cal beneficiaries as a result of the Affordable Care Act.
- DHCS had not adequately overseen its Denti-Cal administrative contractor, which had not "performed contract-required outreach for improving dental access in underserved areas."
  - With 13 million children and adults enrolled, Denti-Cal is the largest state-sponsored dental insurance program
  - Private contractor that administers Denti-Cal is Delta Dental. In 2016, the State of California awarded Delta Dental a new contract to provide administrative services for the Denti-Cal program, continuing the 42-year relationship

== Controversies ==
- Medi-Cal Dental paid to the doctors only 30% of what commercial insurers paid for the same procedures per October 2017 report; even though DHCS must annually review reimbursement levels for Medi-Cal dental services to ensure “reasonable access” for Medi-Cal beneficiaries pursuant to Welfare & Institutions Code §14079
- In San Francisco, 61,440 children were enrolled in Denti-Cal as of 2016, but only three pediatric dentists were accepting new patients as of Mar 2018; similarly, there were only 15 dentists that accepted new clients for 173,000+ adult patients

== Directors ==
- Diana M. Bontá (1999-2002)
- Sandra Shewry (2004-2007)
- David Maxwell-Jolly (2008-2011)
- Toby Douglas (2011-2015)
- Jennifer Kent (2015-2019)
- Richard Figueroa, Jr. (2019-2020)
- Will Lightbourne (2020-2021)
- Michelle Baass (2021-present)
