= California Office of Systems Integration =

Agency within the California Health and Human Services Agency

Office of Systems Integration
Agency overview
- Website: osi.ca.gov

The California Office of Systems Integration is an agency within the California Health and Human Services Agency that manages a "portfolio of large, complex health and human services information technology projects." It was established in 2005.
