= CalWORKs =

The California Work Opportunities and Responsibility to Kids (CalWORKs) program is the California welfare implementation of the federal welfare-to-work Temporary Assistance for Needy Families (TANF) program that provides cash aid and services to eligible needy California families.

== Eligibility and benefits ==
CalWORKs provides cash aid to parents, as well as a variety of services intended to help them find and prepare for employment. The most current requirements, and application instructions, can be found on the CDSS CalWORKs website; the main requirements are:

- residing in California,
- being either pregnant or responsible for a child under 19 years of age,
- being a U.S. national, citizen, legal alien, or legal permanent resident, and
- having income and other resources below a certain threshold depending on the size of your household.

To receive benefits, parents must fulfill requirements such as working 30 hours per week and/or applying for a specified number of jobs per week and/or participating in training and readiness programs. This makes CalWORKs a form of workfare. There is also a lifetime cap of 48 months of benefits received, with some benefits restricted to 24 months. Only 50% of CalWORKs recipients are still enrolled one year after they first entered the program, and only 33% remain past two years. Two years after they first enrolled, the average recipient has used only 9 months of benefits.

== Effects ==
While the long-term effects of CalWORKs on California as a whole are complex and multi-faceted, some immediate effects on those receiving aid are easier to quantify. The resources available to each Californian (i.e. their income, accounting for taxes and benefits such as medical care) can be compared to an estimate of the resources required to meet their basic needs (a poverty threshold varying based on factors such as family size and local cost-of-living) to label them as “in” or “out” of poverty, and thus determine a poverty rate for the state. Several such measures are calculated, including the Census Bureau’s Supplemental Poverty Measure (SPM) and the Public Policy Institute of California’s California Poverty Measure (CPM). The current CPM poverty rate in is 20%, but it is estimated it would be 21% without CalWORKs benefits. That 1 percentage point reduction corresponds to about 380,000 Californians kept "out" of poverty by the program. Of all welfare programs in the state, only CalFresh and earned income tax credits (the federal EITC and the new CalEITC) are responsible for larger reductions (2 percentage points each).

This is a larger reduction than the nationwide average for TANF programs, but by other metrics CalWORKs performs on-par with other states. As far as can be determined from Census (CPS) data, CalWORKs achieves similar effects for low-income families as programs in comparable states. Specifically, no significant differences were found in poverty rates, unemployment rates, TANF (CalWORKs) enrollment rates, or education/training enrollment rates when comparing likely CalWORKs-eligible families.

== Administration ==
It is managed by the California Department of Social Services (CDSS), but is operated and administered locally by the 58 counties of California.

In Los Angeles County, the county Department of Public Social Services (DPSS) administers CalWORKs. It has a caseload larger than any other jurisdiction except the States of California and New York and an annual budget of over $3 billion.

=== First Nations and CalWORKs ===
Federally recognized native tribes are also eligible to receive federal TANF funding to administer TANF programs ("Tribal TANF"). The State of California also provides funding to supplement the TANF grants received by tribes located within the state. This is allotted based on the number of families receiving benefits from each Tribal TANF program. For federally recognized tribes that do not implement TANF programs, county CalWORKs administrators are required to make CalWORKs benefits available. Members of unrecognized tribes are treated by the counties as residents, and so can receive CalWORKs as well.

== History ==
CalWORKs was created by the Welfare-to-Work Act of 1997. It replaced the former Greater Avenues to Independence (GAIN) program, the California implementation of the federal Aid to Families with Dependent Children (AFDC) program. At the federal level, AFDC was replaced with TANF in 1996, bringing work requirements that were stricter than those of the AFDC program, and a new cap on individuals' lifetime benefits. While these requirements for participants were stricter, TANF did give more freedom to states to design their implementations of the program than they had with the AFDC. The California Legislature initially created CalWORKs to be more generous than many other states' TANF implementations. The lifetime benefit cap was initially set at 60 months but was reduced in 2011 to 48 months, was increased once again to 60 months as of May 2022.

== Federal influence ==
Although states have broad freedom in the design and implementation of their TANF programs, they must meet certain requirements to receive federal funds. This puts the generosity or austerity of CalWORKs to some degree under the control of federal legislation.

The effects of such reductions in benefits are of course varied and complex. California conducted a controlled experiment of a 15% reduction in maximum benefits (as well as other reductions) of the AFDC program beginning in 1991 that illustrates some of these impacts. After 7 years, the employment rates and average wages were somewhat higher for AFDC recipients who had been placed in the reduced-benefit program than in the control group. This could be explained by participants having a greater need for employment income when their benefits are smaller. The average disposable incomes (including wages and benefits) for the reduced-benefit group stayed approximately equal to that of the control group, however, as increases in wages made up for decreases in benefits. This disposable income (for both groups) remained well below the poverty line.

A key way the federal government exerts its influence is by threatening a reduction in funding unless at least 50% of families receiving monthly payments meet work or job training requirements. Specifically, to be counted toward this Work Participation Rate (WPR), parents must perform 30 hours per week (20 for single parents with a child under 6) of work, or work-related activities such as job training, job search assistance, or community service. In 2017, California had a WPR of 61%, thanks mainly to the 52% of recipients of federal money who had un-subsidized employment.

The state has responded to accountability to federal work participation requirements in several ways. Governor Jerry Brown proposed reforms—enacted in 2012—to require recipients to be engaged in federally approved work activities after the first 24 months of aid (during which time a more flexible set of work activities is available). This change was also intended to decrease the time recipients spend in the program, hence cutting costs at the same time as guarding against a reduction in federal funding. The state also extends this accountability to the counties through a policy of decreasing funding to counties that don't meet the federal rate in the event that the state as a whole receives a penalty. The state further requires CalWORKs recipients, along with their caseworker, to construct plans for beginning work-activities as soon as possible.

== See also ==
- Welfare in California
