= California Department of Aging =

American government agency

- Official logo

Department overview
- Type: State Department
- Jurisdiction: California
- Parent department: California Health and Human Services Agency

The California Department of Aging (CDA) is a California state department that oversees the execution of the Older Californians Act and the Older Americans Act. It is nominally under the auspices of the California Health and Human Services Agency. It is headquartered in Sacramento. As of September 2026, the California Department of Aging is being led by director Claire Ramsey.
