= Welfare in California =

Overview of welfare in the U.S. State of California

Welfare in California consists of federal welfare programs—which are often at least partially administered by state and county agencies—and several independent programs, which are usually administered by counties.

Some of the largest California-specific programs are:

- MediCal, the California Medicaid program
- CalFresh, the California Supplemental Nutrition Assistance Program (SNAP / Food Stamp program)
- CalWORKs, the California Temporary Assistance for Needy Families (TANF) program

== Medi-Cal ==
The California Medical Assistance Program (Medi-Cal) is California's Medicaid program serving low-income families, seniors, persons with disabilities, children in foster care, pregnant women, and childless adults with incomes below 138% of federal poverty level. Benefits include doctor's office visits, emergency services, hospitalization, maternity and newborn care, mental health and substance use disorder treatment, dental care (Denti-Cal), vision care, and long-term care and support. Approximately 12.5 million people were enrolled in Medi-Cal as of May 2015, or about 32.4% of California's population.

== CalWORKs ==
The California Work Opportunities and Responsibility to Kids (CalWORKs) program is the California implementation of the federal welfare-to-work Temporary Assistance for Needy Families (TANF) program that gives cash aid and services to eligible needy California families.

== CalFresh ==
CalFresh is the California implementation of the federal Supplemental Nutrition Assistance Program (SNAP), formerly known as the Food Stamp program, which provides financial assistance for purchasing food for those in poverty in California.

== State Supplementation Program ==
The State Supplementation Program (SSP or SSI/SSP), also known as the Supplemental Nutrition Assistance Program (SNAP, CalFresh) cash-out program, is the state supplement to the federal Supplemental Security Income (SSI) program and provides state-funded supplemental food benefits to SSI recipients in lieu of SNAP benefits. SSI recipients in states that provide state supplements to SSI are ineligible for SNAP/CalFresh pursuant to 7 U.S.C. § 2015(g).

== Healthy Families Program ==
The Healthy Families Program (HFP) was the California implementation of the federal Children's Health Insurance Program (CHIP) that provided low-cost insurance that provides health, dental, and vision coverage to children who do not have insurance and do not qualify for no-cost Medi-Cal. The HFP was discontinued and Medi-Cal requirements were lowered so that HFP patients would qualify for Medi-Cal. Nearly 900,000 children were moved from the HFP into Medi-Cal beginning in 2013.

== Medi-Cal Access Program ==
The Medi-Cal Access Program (formerly known as the Access for Infants and Mothers Program) provides low-cost health insurance coverage to middle-income pregnant women who don't already have health insurance and whose income is too high to qualify for Medi-Cal.

== Indigent programs ==
Since 1933, California law has required counties to provide relief to the poor, including health care services and general assistance.

=== General Assistance / General Relief ===
The California Welfare and Institutions Code states:

Every county and every city and county shall relieve and support all incompetent, poor, indigent persons, and those incapacitated by age, disease, or accident, lawfully resident therein, when such persons are not supported and relieved by their relatives or friends, by their own means, or by state hospitals or other state or private institutions.

It has been said that the "provision of general assistance is inconsistent, fragmented, and widely differentiated", with aid ranging from $160 per month in Santa Barbara County to $360 in neighboring Ventura County. In Orange County, aid was $277 per month as of July 2012 and capped at three months per 12-month period for residents deemed employable.

California has provided some form of general assistance since the mid-1800s, and much of the language can be traced back to the Pauper Act of 1901. San Francisco Proposition N of 2002, colloquially known as Care Not Cash, was a San Francisco ballot measure sponsored by Supervisor Gavin Newsom designed to cut the money given in the General Assistance programs to homeless people in exchange for shelters and other forms of services.

=== County Medical Services Program / Medically Indigent Service Program ===
County indigent medical programs can be categorized as County Medical Services Program (CMSP) and Medically Indigent Service Program (MISP) counties. There are 34 CMSP counties and 24 MISP counties. The CMSP county programs are largely managed by the state, whereas MISP counties manage their own programs with their own rules and regulations. Many patients from both the CMSP and MISP county programs are expected to transition to county LIHP / MCE / HCCI programs and eventually to Medi-Cal / Medicaid when the ObamaCare provisions take effect in 2014.

== Public housing ==
City- and county-based housing authorities manage the Housing Choice Voucher program for the payment of rent assistance to private landlords on behalf of low-income households, as well as overseeing Community Development Block Grant (CDBG) entitlements and HOME Investment Partnerships Program (HOME) funding.

Local housing authorities were created following the 1 September 1937 signing by President Franklin D. Roosevelt of the Housing Act of 1937, sometimes called the Wagner-Steagall Act, which provided for subsidies to be paid from the U.S. government to local public housing agencies (LHA's) to improve living conditions for low-income families. On 21 March 1938 Governor Frank Merriam signed multiple laws including the Housing Authorities Law and the Housing Cooperation Law that establishes a housing authority in every city and county in California and allows for the establishment of joint powers area housing authorities. The Housing and Community Development Act of 1974 signed by President Gerald Ford later amended the Housing Act of 1937 and created Section 8 housing, now known as the Housing Choice Voucher program. The California Department of Housing and Community Development (HCD) Housing Assistance Program (HAP) acts as the local housing authority for 12 rural counties: Alpine, Amador, Calaveras, Colusa, Glenn, Inyo, Modoc, Mono, Sierra, Siskiyou, Trinity, and Tuolumne. Some other examples of local and area housing authorities include the:

- Housing Authority of the County of Los Angeles (HACoLA) within the Los Angeles County Community Development Department (CDC)
- Housing Authority of the City of Los Angeles (HACLA)
- Housing Authority of the County of San Diego (HACSD)
- Orange County Housing Authority (OCHA)
- Housing Authority of the County of Riverside (HARivCo)
- Housing Authority of the County of San Bernardino (HACSB)
- Housing Authority of the County of Santa Clara (HACSC)
- San Francisco Housing Authority (SFHA)
- Oakland Housing Authority (OHA)
- Housing Authority of the City of Fresno and the Housing Authority of Fresno County
- Housing Authority of the County of Alameda (HACA)
- Sacramento Housing and Redevelopment Agency (SHRA)
- Housing Authority of the City of Long Beach (HACLB)
- Irvine Campus Housing Authority (ICHA) of the Regents of the University of California for the campus of UC Irvine

== Workforce development ==
Workforce development programs provide a combination of education and training services to prepare individuals for work and to help them improve their prospects in the labor market. In the broadest sense, workforce development efforts include secondary and postsecondary education, on-the-job and employer-provided training, and the publicly funded system of job training and employment services. Title I of the 2014 Workforce Innovation and Opportunity Act authorizes programs to provide employment and training services, and establishes the "one-stop" delivery system.

In California, the Governor, California Workforce Development Board, Employment Development Department and local workforce development boards administer the program.

== Statewide Automated Welfare System (SAWS) ==
The Statewide Automated Welfare System (SAWS) is the county-managed public assistance eligibility and enrollment system, e.g., the case management system for county eligibility staff providing CalWORKs, Welfare to Work, CalFresh, Medi-Cal, Foster Care, Refugee Assistance, County Medical Services Program, and General Assistance/General Relief. Counties are organized into three SAWS consortia (joint powers authorities): C-IV (Consortium-IV), WCDS (CalWIN), and Los Angeles County's LEADER Replacement System (LRS).

LRS began deployment on February 23, 2016 and was designed and developed in collaboration with C-IV to eventually consolidate LRS and C4Yourself into a single system. The California Budget Act of 1995 had required the Health and Welfare Agency Data Center (now the California Office of Systems Integration), in collaboration with the County Welfare Directors Association, to develop a plan to consolidate the systems to no more than four county consortia; ABX1 of 2011 required OSI to oversee the LRS contract and the creation of a new consortium to replace the LEADER and C-IV consortia.

== Overall Reductions in Poverty Rate ==
While the long-term effect of these programs on California as a whole is multi-faceted and complex, the immediate effect on those receiving aid is somewhat easier to quantify. The resources available to each Californian (i.e. their income, accounting for taxes and benefits such as medical care) can be compared to an estimate of the resources required to meet their basic needs (a poverty threshold varying based on factors such as family size and local cost-of-living) to label them as "in" or "out" of poverty, and thus determine a poverty rate for the state. Several such measures are calculated, including the Census Bureau's Supplemental Poverty Measure (SPM) and the Public Policy Institute of California's California Poverty Measure (CPM). The current CPM poverty rate is 20%, but if welfare benefits were excluded from the estimates of families' resources that would rise to 28%. In other words, one third of the people who would be in poverty if welfare programs didn't exist are raised "out" of poverty by welfare programs.

About a quarter of that effect (2 percentage points reduction in the CPM poverty rate) is due to CalFresh, and another quarter is due to earned income tax credits (the federal EITC and the new CalEITC). A 1 percentage point reduction (about 380,000 Californians) is attributable to CalWORKs. Similar effects are achieved by nation-wide programs. Using the SPM, tax credits achieve a 2.5 percentage point reduction in the poverty rate, and SNAP (of which CalFresh is a part), SSI, and housing subsidies each achieve a 1 percentage point reduction (about 3,300,000 U.S. residents each). Only a 0.2 percentage point reduction in poverty is attributed to TANF (of which CalWORKs is a part).

== See also ==
- Social programs in the United States
