= California Department of Developmental Services =

Department of Developmental Services
Agency overview
- Jurisdiction: California
- Annual budget: US$ 18.7 billion (2025-26)
- Agency executive: Pete Cervinka, Director
- Parent agency: California Health and Human Services Agency
- Website: www.dds.ca.gov

The California Department of Developmental Services is a state agency of California, headquartered in Downtown Sacramento. The agency provides services for California residents with developmental disabilities, such as autism, cerebral palsy, epilepsy, intellectual disability and conditions related to intellectual disability. It provides services through nonprofit agencies called regional centers. There are 21 regional centers throughout the state of California.
