= CalFresh =

California implementation of the federal Supplemental Nutrition Assistance Program

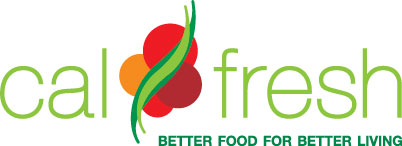
CalFresh logo

CalFresh is the California implementation of the federal Supplemental Nutrition Assistance Program (SNAP), formerly known as the Food Stamp program, which provides financial assistance for purchasing food to low-income California residents.

Beneficiaries, who meet federal income eligibility rules, receive an electronic benefit that can be used to purchase foods at many markets and stores.

CalFresh is currently funded by a private/public partnership. Contractors, alongside community based subcontractors, contribute non-federal funds (State Share). The CDSS holds onto a portion of the reimbursements in order to fund a statewide hotline, develop materials, conduct trainings, and enhance outreach programs.

== History ==
Originally the Food Stamp Program was established by Henry Wallace, Secretary of Agriculture, in 1939 under the Roosevelt administration. Food stamps were first introduced in Rochester, New York. This program was then later readdressed by the introduction of the food stamp pilot programs in 1961, under the Kennedy administration. Later on 31 January 1964, President Johnson proposed to Congress to pass legislation that would make the food stamp programs permanent. In April 1965, the program participation reached half a million, eventually reaching 15 million in October, 1974. Beginning in 1990, electronic benefit transfer cards replaced paper food stamps, prompting a change in name of the program to the Supplemental Nutrition Assistance Program.

CalFresh was formally established in the Food Stamp Reform Act of 1977. CalFresh was originally designed to act as a "safety net" against hunger for low income Americans in the state of California. Around the 1980s, the original program was greatly expanded due to widespread and severe domestic hunger. Later in 2003, the CDSS and CDPH cooperated with the California Association of Food Banks to develop the first California Food Stamp Access Improvement Plan. As of 1 January 2013, this plan has been overseen by the CDSS and updated annually.

== Eligibility for immigrants ==
As part of large-scale federal welfare reform in 1996, many documented non-citizen immigrants in California lost their eligibility for food stamps through the CalFresh program. Many activists criticized the change as a political attack on immigration, rather than a substantive effort to improve fiscal responsibility. Since then, access to food subsidy benefits have been mostly returned through the California Food Assistance program (CFAP). Under CalFresh, parents who are undocumented can apply for food stamps on behalf of their US-citizen children. Increased food subsidy access for undocumented immigrants will arrive soon after state-level legislative changes. The passage of Assembly Bill 135 is set to increase access to CFAP benefits for all California residents aged 55 years or older, regardless of immigration status.

There are about 2.3 million undocumented immigrants in California, and around 45% of undocumented immigrants and 64% of undocumented children are food insecure. These numbers are bolstered by the fact that undocumented children and DACA enrollees are currently ineligible for food stamp benefits. Policy advocacy organizations such as Nourish California are pushing the state government to expand state funding to cover all eligible immigrants, regardless of immigration status, to lower hunger in the state. Only about 11% of California's unauthorized immigrant population is over the age of 55.

== Student eligibility ==
When CalFresh was first introduced, college students were not considered a main target for food assistance; most students at the time were from white, middle-class families, under the care of their parents and were young high school graduates without dependents to provide for. To prevent students from mis-using the system, students enrolled in higher education for at least half-time were automatically ineligible for SNAP.

However, many students nowadays come from low-income families, racial and ethnic minorities, have jobs, are parents, or are not recent high school graduates. Many college students are leaving their homes and managing their own finances for the first time in their lives and depending on where they go to school, there may be limited access to affordable and nutritious food, making students particularly vulnerable to food insecurity. In 2015, in response to the changing student population, the CalFresh Student Eligibility Amendment established exemptions to the rule in Section 273.5(a) of Title 7 of the Code of Federal Regulations which excluded college students enrolled at least half-time from SNAP benefits. Commonly met exemptions include students be under 18 or over 49, physically or mentally unfit to work, participate in federal or state work study, be employed for at least 20 hours per week, participate in SNAP employment and training program, receive Temporary Assistance for Needy Families benefits, and caring for dependent children.

Unfortunately, many students are misinformed that using CalFresh or SNAP will negatively affect their financial aid packages and are worried about the stigma associated with food insecurity in college campuses. Out of fear of being ostracized by their peers, many college students simply do not apply or do not talk about the program, limiting awareness and the potential of CalFresh to eliminate college food insecurity. To counteract this, many recent legislations and changes to SNAP are focusing on SNAP education, outreach, and accessibility. For instance, the recently proposed College Student Hunger Act of 2019 focuses on improving student eligibility, increasing outreach and education for SNAP, and introduces a student hunger pilot program to test different ways CalFresh can be made more useful for students. The Act would allow Pell-Grant eligible and independent students to qualify for benefits, lowers the 20 hours/week work requirement to 10 hours/week, and requires the Department of Education to notify Pell Grant eligible students of their SNAP eligibility. The pilot program will test different ways students can use SNAP benefits such as directly at the dining hall or indirectly to help pay for student meal plans.

While many schools try to connect students to SNAP, students still struggle to qualify despite facing food insecurity, feel intimidated by the probing application process, and are often misinformed of how the program works. To avoid the stigma often attached with food insecurity, many college students simply do not apply. Many students are also misinformed that using CalFresh will negatively affect their financial aid packages. While there are about 4 million people enrolled in CalFresh, there are an additional 4 million eligible people who are not enrolled which may be due to incomplete applications, improper documentation, and the time it takes to verify applications. Fortunately, measures to make the application more accessible for students are underway. For instance, California SB 173—a bill by Senator Bill Dodd—will required colleges to alert any students participating in work-study of their SNAP eligibility and provide them with a more efficient and time-saving application process.

== Administration ==
The Supplemental Nutrition Assistance Program (SNAP) is a federal aid program administered by the U.S. Department of Agriculture (USDA), while CalFresh is administered jointly by the USDA, the California Department of Social Services (CDSS), and the welfare departments of the 58 counties of California.

Federal law mostly consists of the Food Stamp Act (7 U.S.C. § 2011 et seq.), and state law mostly consists of California Welfare and Institutions Code (WIC) Division 9, Part 6, Chapter 10 (WIC § 18900 et seq.). Federal regulations are codified in Code of Federal Regulations (CFR) Title 7 (7 CFR 271 et seq.) and state regulations are not part of the California Code of Regulations (CCR) but are separately published as the CDSS Manual of Policies and Procedures (MPP) and are "available for public use in the office of the welfare department of each county". The MPP includes the Eligibility and Assistance Standards Manual (MPP divisions 40-50, 81-82, 89-91), the Food Stamp Manual (MPP division 63), and the Electronic Benefit Transfer System Manual (MPP division 16). In addition to this manual, the CDSS often communicates policy direction to counties through periodic All County Letters (ACLs), All County Information Notices (ACINs), and business letters.

== Funding and benefits ==
CalFresh Outreach is funded by both Prime Contractors and subcontractors that rely on federal-based and nonfederal-based entities. The Prime Contractors are made up of the organizations: California Association of Food banks, Catholic Charities of California, Center for Healthy Communities, Code for America, INFO LINE of San Diego County, and Redwood Community Health Coalition. Partners that fund the program as well, include the USDA, FNS Western Region Announcements, and Women, Infants, and Children Program. Fifty percent of funding is given by the USDA to pay for salaries, CalFresh outreach office expenses, approved costs necessary to run the program, along with reimbursement towards contractors.

During the COVID-19 pandemic in 2020, 2.6 million people were estimated to have received $166 per month. Funding has supported 5.1 million people as well from 2022-2023. It is estimated to support 3,054,600 households in the year 2023-2024. Benefits received by households from the year 2022-2023 costed $14.5 billion dollars, with each person receiving around $185 per month. Benefits continue to grow in regards to who they impact, as they have reached around 71% of the eligible population.

== See also ==
- Welfare in California
- California Department of Social Services
- California Department of Public Health
