= California Department of Public Health =

Public health department

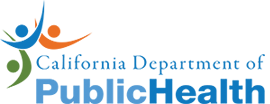

Agency overview
- Jurisdiction: California
- Annual budget: US$ 5.1 billion (2024)
- Agency executive: Dr. Erica Pan, MD, MPH, FIDSA, FAAP, Director and State Public Health Officer
- Parent agency: California Health and Human Services Agency
- Website: cdph.ca.gov

The California Department of Public Health (CDPH) is the state department responsible for public health in California. It is a subdivision of the California Health and Human Services Agency. It enforces some of the laws in the California Health and Safety Codes, notably the licensing of some types of healthcare facilities. One of its functions is to oversee vital records operations throughout the state.

== History ==
The California Department of Public Health was initially called the State Board of Health and Vital Statistics, and was created by the Legislature as Chapter 228 of Statutes 1869-1870. It was California’s first public health agency, and the second in the nation. The name changed in 1872 to the State Board of Health, with advisory and informational duties. The current Department of Public Health was created in 1927 (Chapter 276, Statutes 1927) and assumed all of the powers and duties of the former State Board of Health.

== Programs ==
=== List of divisions and branches ===
- Center for Healthy Communities
  - California Tobacco Control
  - Childhood Lead Poisoning Prevention
  - Chronic Disease Control
  - Chronic Disease Surveillance and Research
  - Emergency Preparedness Team
  - Environmental Health Investigations Branch
  - Injury and Violence Prevention Branch
  - nutrition and Physical Activity Branch
  - Office of Problem Gambling
  - Office of School Health
  - Office of Suicide Prevention
  - Substance and Addiction Prevention Branch
- Center for Infectious Diseases
  - Office of AIDS
- Center for Preparedness and Response
  - Be Prepared California
  - Statewide Medical and Health Exercise
- Center for Healthcare Quality
  - Public Policy & Prevention
  - Healthcare-Associated Infections Program
  - Licensing and Certification
  - Field Operations Divisions (North and South)
- Director/State Public Health Officer
- Center for Family Health
  - Genetic Disease Screening Program
  - Maternal, Child, and Adolescent Health
  - Women, Infants and Children Supplemental Nutrition Program
- Center for Health Statistics and Informatics
  - Vital Records
  - Research and Analytics Branch
  - Vital Records Issuance and Preservation Branch
  - Informatics Branch
  - Operations Branch
- Center for Environmental Health
  - Division of Food and Drug Safety
  - Division of Radiation Safety and Environmental Management
  - Environmental Health Support Section

=== Medical Marijuana Program ===
CDPH operates the Medical Marijuana Program, tasked with issuing identification cards under Compassionate Use Act of 1996, and California Senate Bill 420.

=== Kids' Plates Program ===
CDPH administers the state's Kids' Plates program, which funds programs to protect children through the sale of customized license plates featuring one of four symbols- Heart, Hand, Star or Plus sign in the plate message. Of the proceeds, 50% supports child care licensing and inspections, 25% supports prevention of child abuse and 25% supports accidental childhood injury prevention programs.

=== Office of Health Equity ===
The Office of Health Equity (OHE) was established, as authorized by Section 131019.5 of the California Health and Safety Code, to provide a key leadership role to reduce health and mental health disparities to vulnerable communities. The Deputy Director of the OHE reports to the Director at CDPH and works closely with the Director of Health Care Services.

A priority of this groundbreaking office is building of cross-sectoral partnerships. The work of OHE is informed in part, by their advisory committee and stakeholder meetings. The office consults with community-based organizations and local governmental agencies to ensure that community perspectives and input are included in policies and any strategic plans, recommendations, and implementation activities.

OHE is divided into the following three units:

Community Development and Engagement Unit's mission is to strengthen the CDPH’s focus and ability to advise and assist other state departments in their mission to increase access to, and the quality of, culturally and linguistically competent mental health care and services.

Policy Unit's mission is to tackle complex projects that require input and collaboration across multiple agencies and departments, most of which are not traditionally thought of as health related.

Health Research and Statistics Unit (HRSU) is a leading state unit in collecting data and disseminating information about health and mental health disparities and inequities in California. HRSU researches and produces data to fulfill statutory mandated reports and provides information and technical assistance to CDPH programs, state agencies, local health departments and stakeholders who are working to collect and report information on health and mental disparities and inequities in California.

=== Licensing, complaints, and investigations ===
Division 2, Chapter 2 of the California Health and Safety Codes enumerates 13 types of facilities in Section 1250.1 including hospitals, skilled nursing, and hospice; these are generally regulated by the Licensing and Certification Division of the California Department of Public Health.

It has been criticized for lack of investigations and limited fines. In 2014, lawmakers held a hearing after investigative reporters raised concerns. Cases from 2001 were reportedly still open as of 2014.

In 2015, inconsistent enforcement of privacy laws was highlighted.

=== Center for Infectious Disease ===
The Center for Infectious Diseases (CID) protects the people in California from the threat of preventable infectious diseases and assists those living with an infectious disease in securing prompt and appropriate access to healthcare, medications and associated support services.

Public Health Efforts

- Supports the investigation and diagnosis of infectious diseases of public health significance.
- Identifies, prevents, and interrupts the transmission of vaccine-preventable diseases, sexually transmitted diseases (STDs), HIV/AIDS, tuberculosis, viral hepatitis, emerging infectious diseases, vector-borne diseases, zoonotic diseases, and other contagious infectious diseases.
- Leverages human and budgetary resources from government and non-government sources.
- Conducts and coordinates public health surveillance and epidemiologic studies to assist in defining, preventing, and controlling infectious diseases.
- Helps local health departments and community-based organizations plan, develop, implement, and improve prevention, control, care, treatment, and social support programs for infectious diseases.
- Plans for and responds to natural or man-made emergencies due to infectious diseases.
- Promotes evidence-based public health practice and program integration at the client level for seamless service delivery.
- Provides reference and diagnostic laboratory services essential for the detection, epidemiologic investigation, control, and prevention of diseases caused by microbial and viral agents.
- Provides support to local public health laboratory personnel for developing and maintaining high quality local microbial and viral laboratory services, including consultation and training in state-of-the-art standardized laboratory procedures.
- Works closely with health officials in Mexico to protect and promote the health of people living in California border communities.
- Coordinates education, communication, health improvements along the US-Mexico border.
- Monitors diseases in California and Baja California Mexico to ensure that our border residents thrive.
- Supports the public health and medical needs of refugees undergoing resettlement in California.
- Administers the Refugee Health Assessment Program for the early identification and treatment of both infectious and chronic health conditions.

== History ==
In 2007 it was discovered that CDPH had distributed green canvas "EAT FRUITS AND VEGETABLES AND BE ACTIVE" lunch bags (soft lunch boxes) whose cover, lining, and logo "tested high for lead levels". Although CDPH eventually asked that people not use 56,000 green or 247,000 blue lunch bags, CDPH was criticized by an advocacy group for not notifying parents quickly enough of the presence of lead in the green ones.

In 2009 CDPH imposed two fines totaling more than $400,000 against Kaiser Permanente hospital in Bellflower, CA, for failing to prevent unauthorized access to confidential patient information. The first fine was in May, of $250,000. It was the largest under a state law enacted following widely publicized violations of privacy involving celebrities, including Farrah Fawcett, Britney Spears and California First Lady Maria Shriver. A second fine, of $187,500, was part of an investigation into employees improperly accessing the medical records of the so-called Octomom Nadya Suleman and her children.

On August 9, 2020, Dr. Sonia Y. Angell resigned as the CDPH Director and State Public Health Officer. Governor Gavin Newsom indicated Angell's resignation was related to data issues with the California Reportable Disease Information Exchange (CalREDIE) system that resulted in nearly 300,000 backlogged COVID-19 test results. On August 10, 2020, Sandra Shewry was appointed as acting director and Erica Pan, California state epidemiologist, was named acting state public health officer. On December 7, 2020, Governor Gavin Newsom announced Tomás Aragón, MD, DrPH as the next Director and State Public Health Officer of the California Department of Public Health. Newsom appointed Erica Pan to assume the role of CDPH Director and State Health Officer beginning on February 1, 2025.
