= Local government in California =

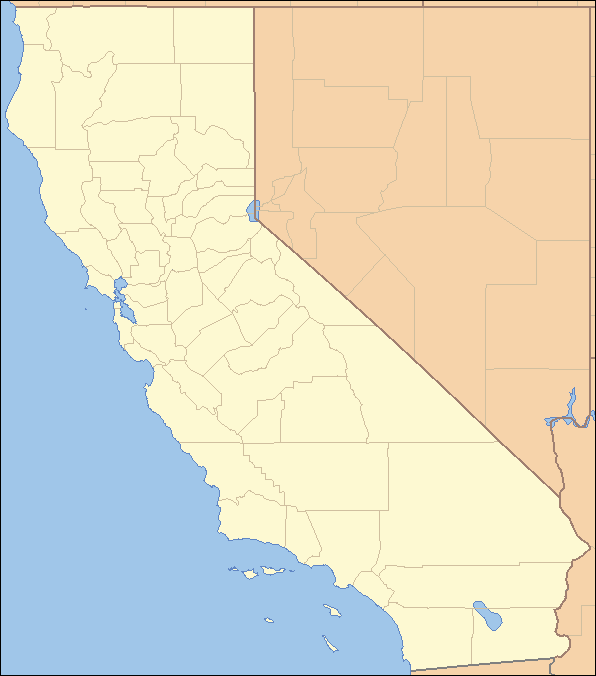
- Location: State of California
- Number: 58 Counties; 482 Municipalities

The government of California has an extensive system of local government that manages public functions throughout the state. Like most states, California is divided into counties, of which there are 58 (including San Francisco) (Note: San Francisco is a consolidated city–county, and its government has the powers of both.) covering the entire state. Most urbanized areas are incorporated as cities, (Note: Twenty-two cities in California style themselves "town" but this distinction has no legal significance.) though not all of California is within the boundaries of a city. School districts, which are independent of cities and counties, handle public education. Many other functions, especially in unincorporated areas, are handled by special districts, which include municipal utility districts, transit districts, health care districts, vector control districts, and geologic hazard abatement districts.

Due to geographical variations in property tax and sales tax revenue (the primary revenue source for cities and counties) and differing attitudes towards priorities, there are variations in the levels of various services from one city to the next.

Article 2, Section 6, of California's constitution provides that elections for county, city, school, and judicial offices are officially non-partisan and political party affiliations are not included on local election ballots.

== History ==
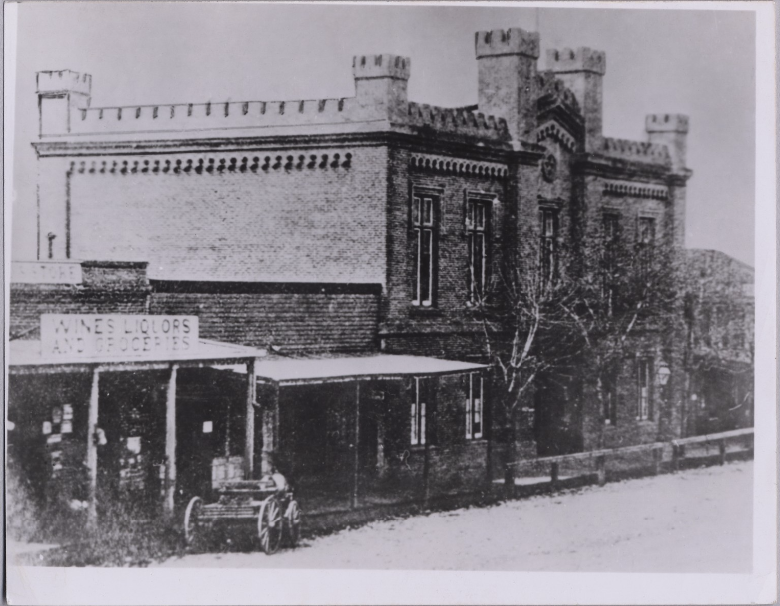
The former San Jose City Hall in 1854; San Jose's is California's oldest civilian settlement, founded in 1777.

On January 4, 1850, the California constitutional committee recommended the formation of 18 counties. They were Benicia, Butte, Fremont, Los Angeles, Mariposa, Monterey, Mount Diablo, Oro, Redding, Sacramento, San Diego, San Francisco, San Joaquin, San Luis Obispo, Santa Barbara, Santa Clara, Sonoma, and Sutter. On April 22, the counties of Branciforte, Calaveras, Coloma, Colusi, Marin, Mendocino, Napa, Trinity, and Yuba were added. Benicia was renamed Solano, Coloma to El Dorado, Fremont to Yolo, Mt. Diablo to Contra Costa, Oro to Tuolumne, and Redding to Shasta. One of the first state legislative acts regarding counties was to rename Branciforte County to Santa Cruz, Colusi to Colusa, and Yola to Yolo. The last county in California to be established is Imperial County on August 7, 1907.

Since 1911, counties in California have been allowed limited home rule, with the Government of Los Angeles County the first in the nation to be granted home rule by charter in 1912. The county governments were originally molded around property recording and assessment, law enforcement, judicial administration, and tax collection, but more recently other functions have been added by the state such as public welfare, public health, water conservation, and flood protection. In 1933, county supervisors gained authority to fix salaries for all county officers other than themselves.

== Counties ==
The basic political subdivision of California are the 58 counties. The county government provides countywide services such as law enforcement, jails, elections and voter registration, vital records, property assessment and records, tax collection, public health, health care, social services, libraries, flood control, fire protection, animal control, agricultural regulations, building inspections, ambulance services, and education departments in charge of maintaining statewide standards. In addition the county serves as the local government for all unincorporated areas (those areas not within any incorporated city), providing services such as police, parks, street maintenance, land use regulations, zoning, and waste disposal. Counties have taxing and police powers. Counties may promulgate ordinances which are usually codified in a county code, and violations of the ordinances are misdemeanor crimes unless otherwise specified as an infraction.

=== County government ===
Fifteen counties are "charter" counties while the rest are "general law" counties. Other than San Francisco, which is a consolidated city-county, California's counties are governed by an elected five-member Board of Supervisors, who appoint executive officers to manage the various functions of the county. (In San Francisco, there is an eleven-member Board of Supervisors, but the executive branch of the government is headed by an elected mayor, department heads are responsible to the mayor, and there is both a city police department and a county sheriff, the latter mostly responsible for operating the county jail and for most jail bookings.) All counties elect all of their supervisors by district (San Francisco had at-large supervisors from 1980 to 2000, but in 2000 the county was once again divided into 11 districts, whose updated borders roughly followed those of the old 1970s-era districts, although the districts themselves were renumbered). All counties elect their treasurers except Los Angeles, Sacramento, Santa Clara, and Glenn. Forty-seven counties have an appointed county administrative officer, while five counties have a more powerful official such as a county manager, chief executive officer, or county mayor, and five rural counties do not have a full-time county administrative officer. All counties elect their district attorneys and their sheriffs. Counties may also have an assessor, a recorder, an auditor, a controller, a treasurer, a tax collector, a county clerk, a registrar of voters, a coroner, and/or a medical examiner. Los Angeles, San Diego, San Francisco, and Santa Clara counties are the only counties that have a coroner or a medical examiner that are independent from the sheriff.

Selection of county halls in California

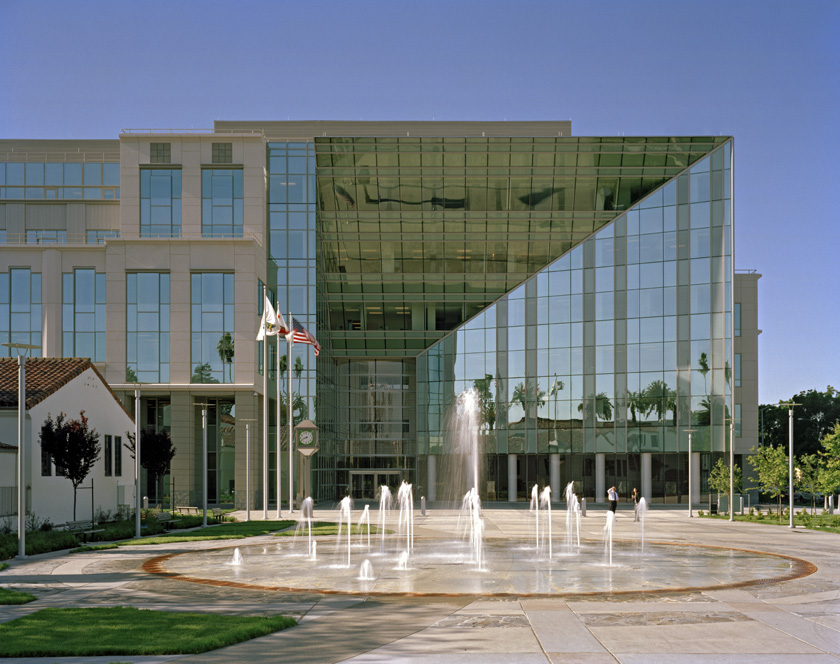
Solano County Hall

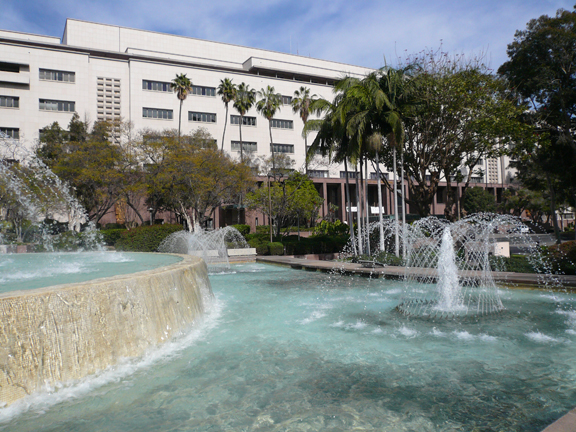
Los Angeles County Hall

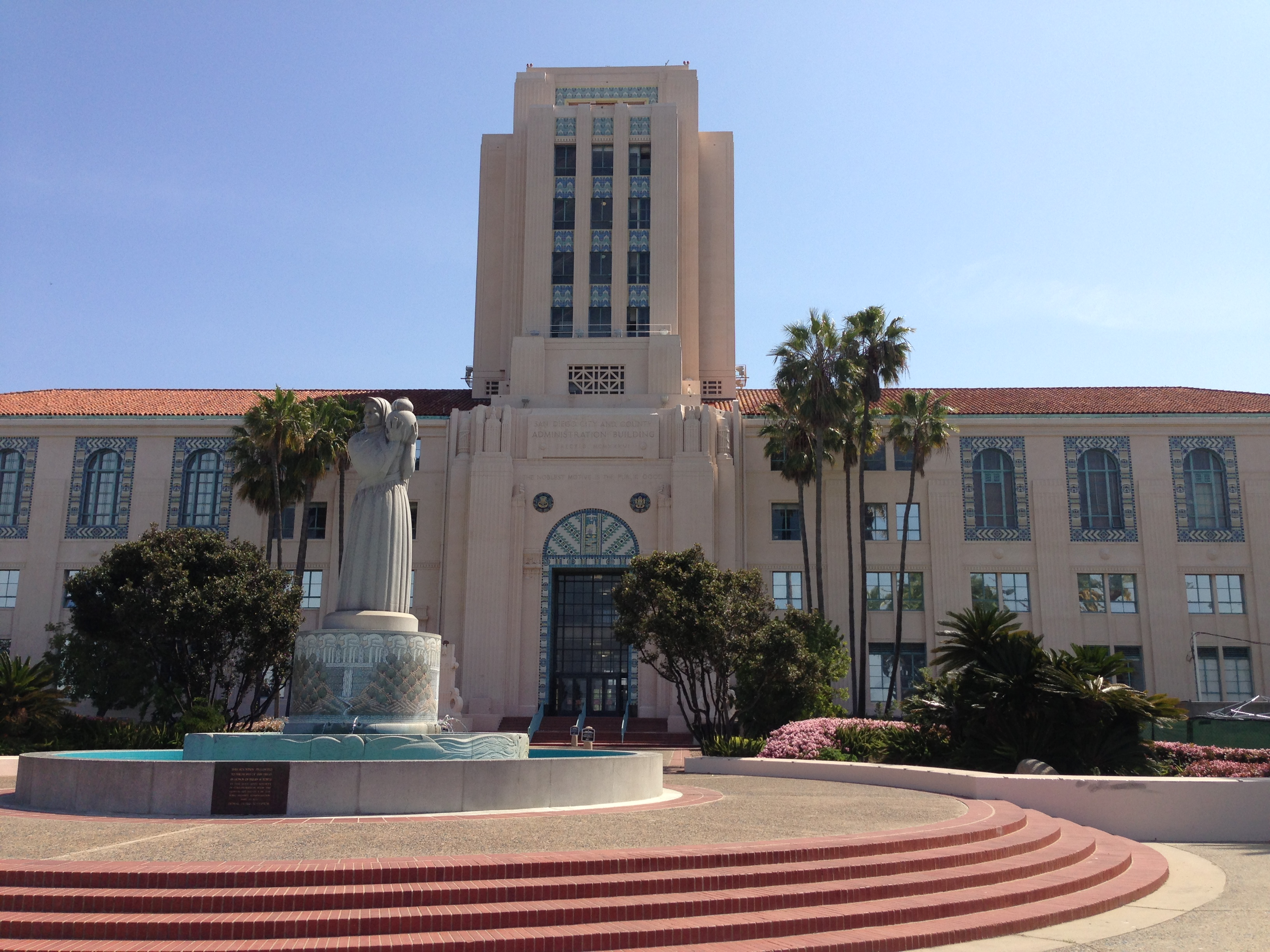
San Diego County Hall

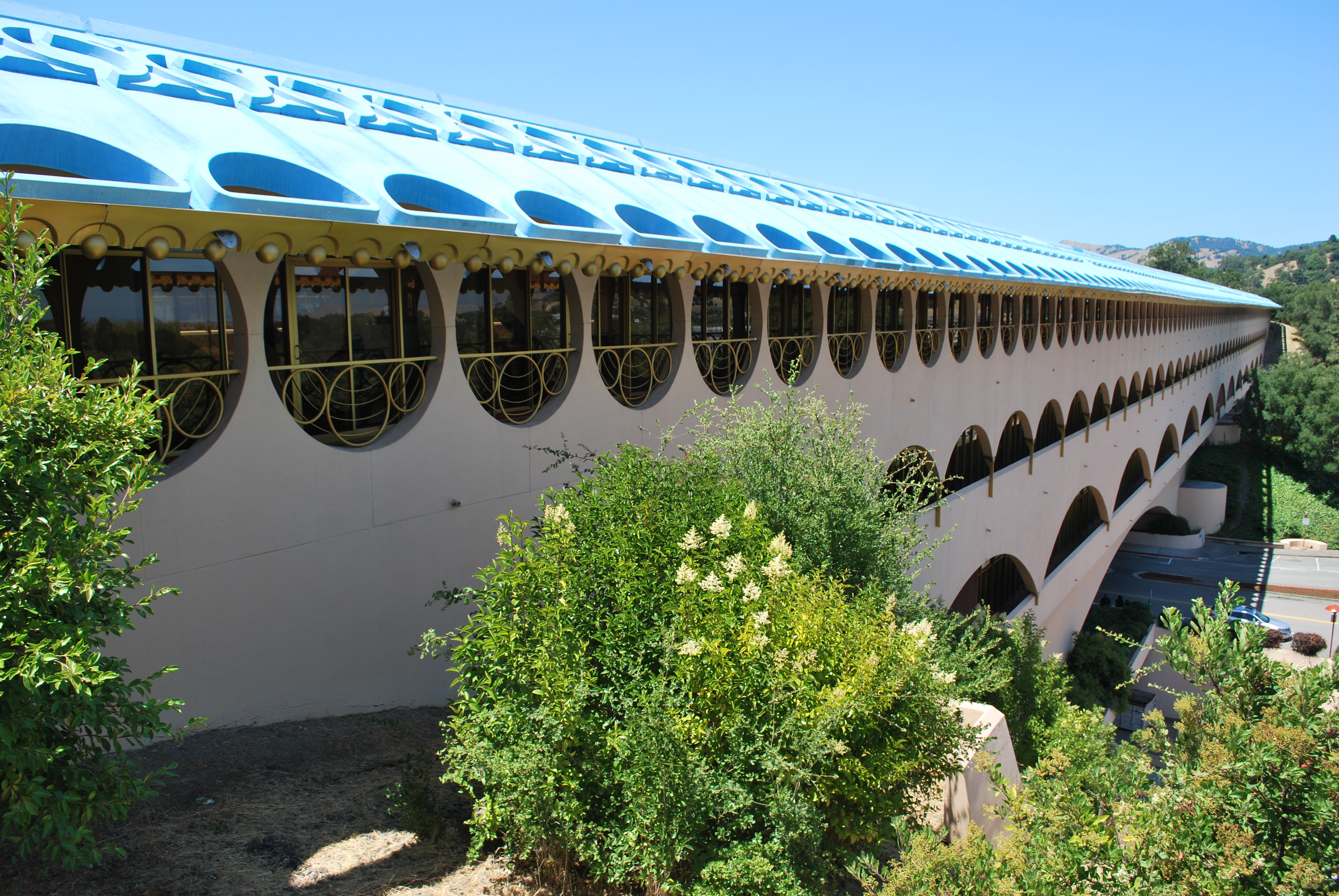
Marin County Hall

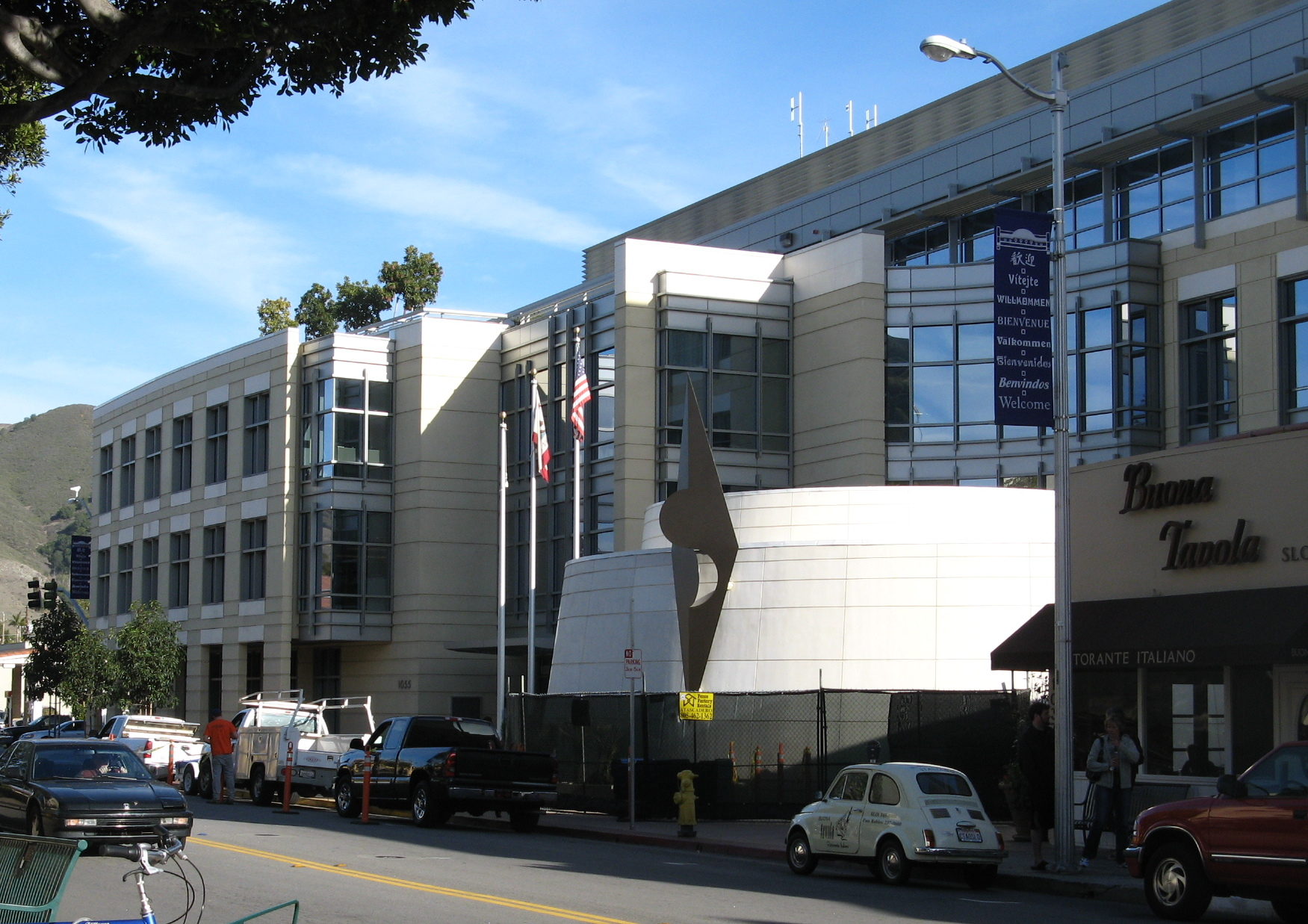
San Luis Obispo County Hall

County congestion management agencies or designees are responsible for comprehensive transportation improvement programs that reduces traffic congestion and transportation-related air pollution. Los Angeles, Orange, Riverside, and San Bernardino counties have county transportation commissions responsible for planning and coordinating transportation services and projects. Since at least 1901, California law has required all counties to provide relief to the poor.

=== County courts ===
California's judicial system is organized along county lines, but the county courts are a part of the state court system, and are not part of the county government. Historically, counties were responsible for providing courthouses and courthouse security for the Superior Courts of California (there is one superior court for each county), even though the superior courts were actually divisions of the state government, not the county governments. This unfunded mandate was a perennial source of frustration for both the superior courts and the counties. The Legislature finally responded by enacting the Trial Court Funding Act of 1997 and then the Trial Court Facilities Act of 2002 to transfer all courthouses to the state government and to relieve the counties of the burden of providing facilities to state courts. However, because the state government was not prepared to assume the burden of developing its own statewide courthouse security force, the superior courts were allowed to establish agreements with county sheriffs by which the courts would reimburse counties for continuing to provide deputy sheriffs to serve as bailiffs in the courthouses.

Selection of county courts in California

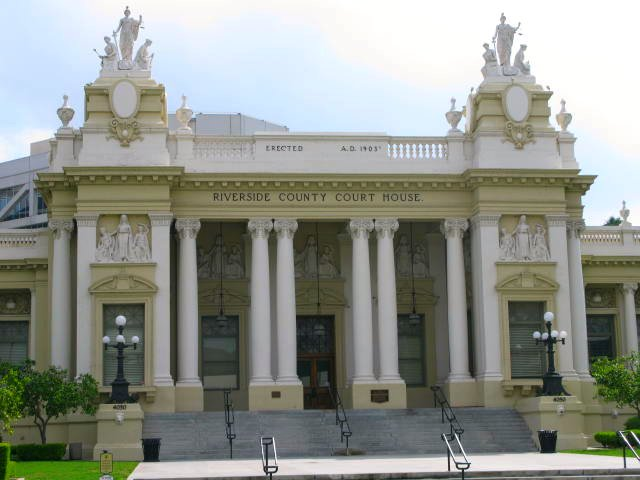
Riverside County Courthouse

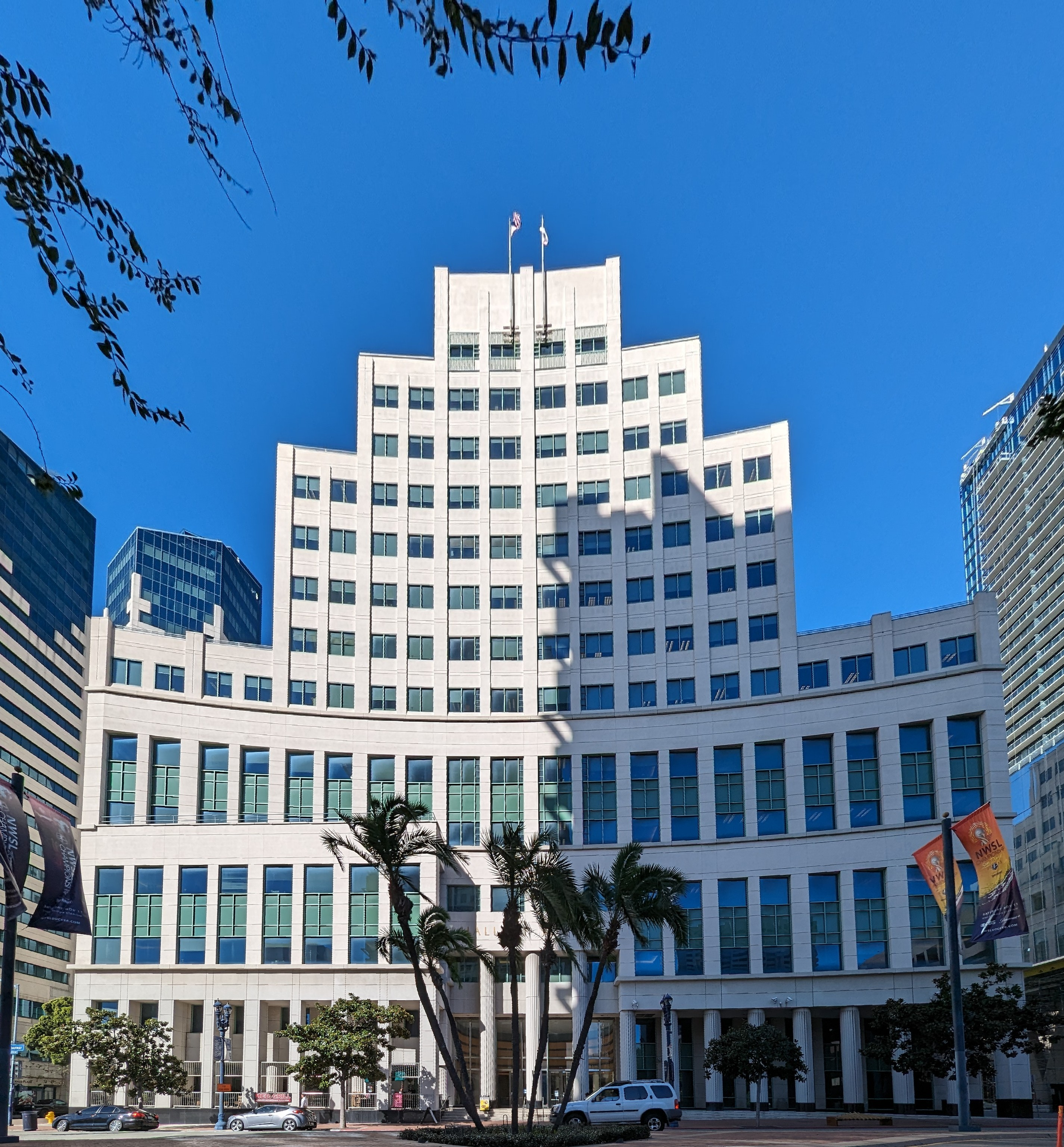
San Diego County Courthouse

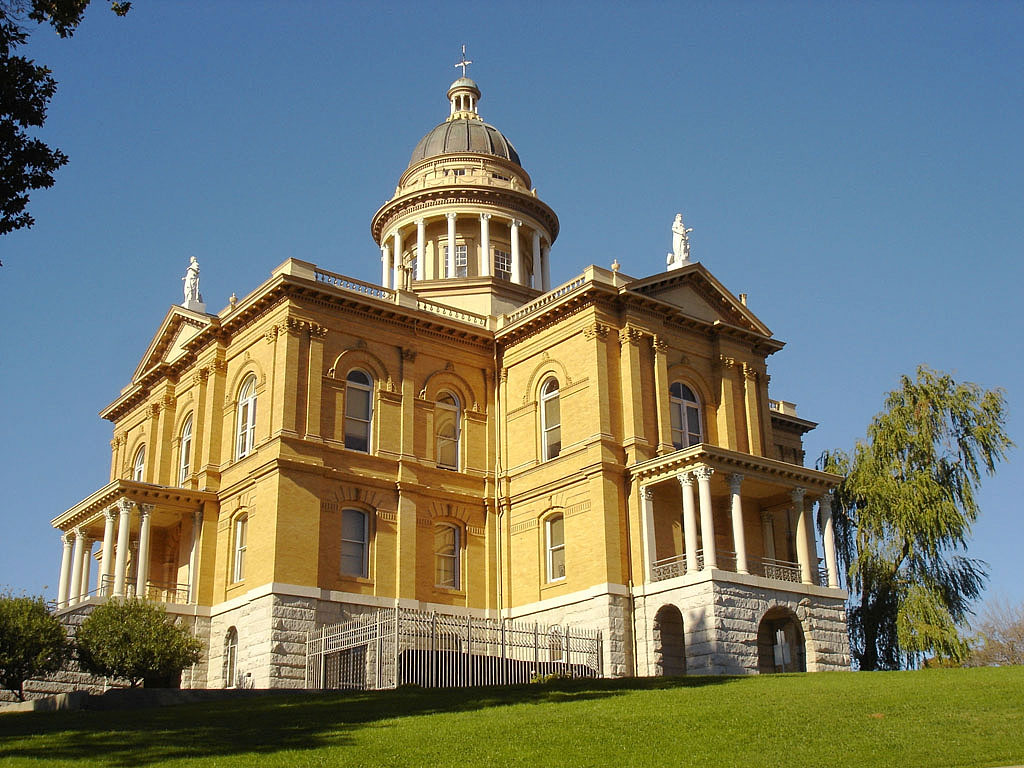
Placer County Courthouse

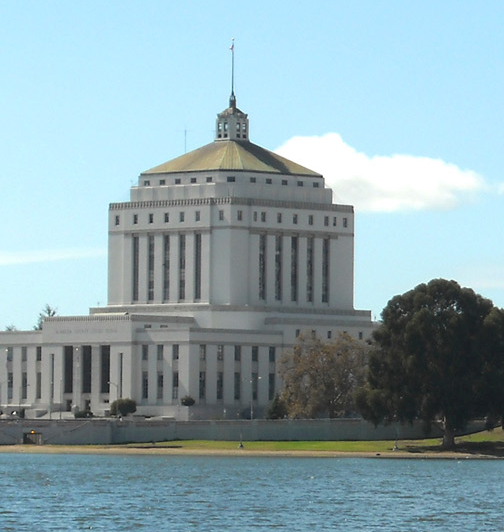
Alameda County Courthouse

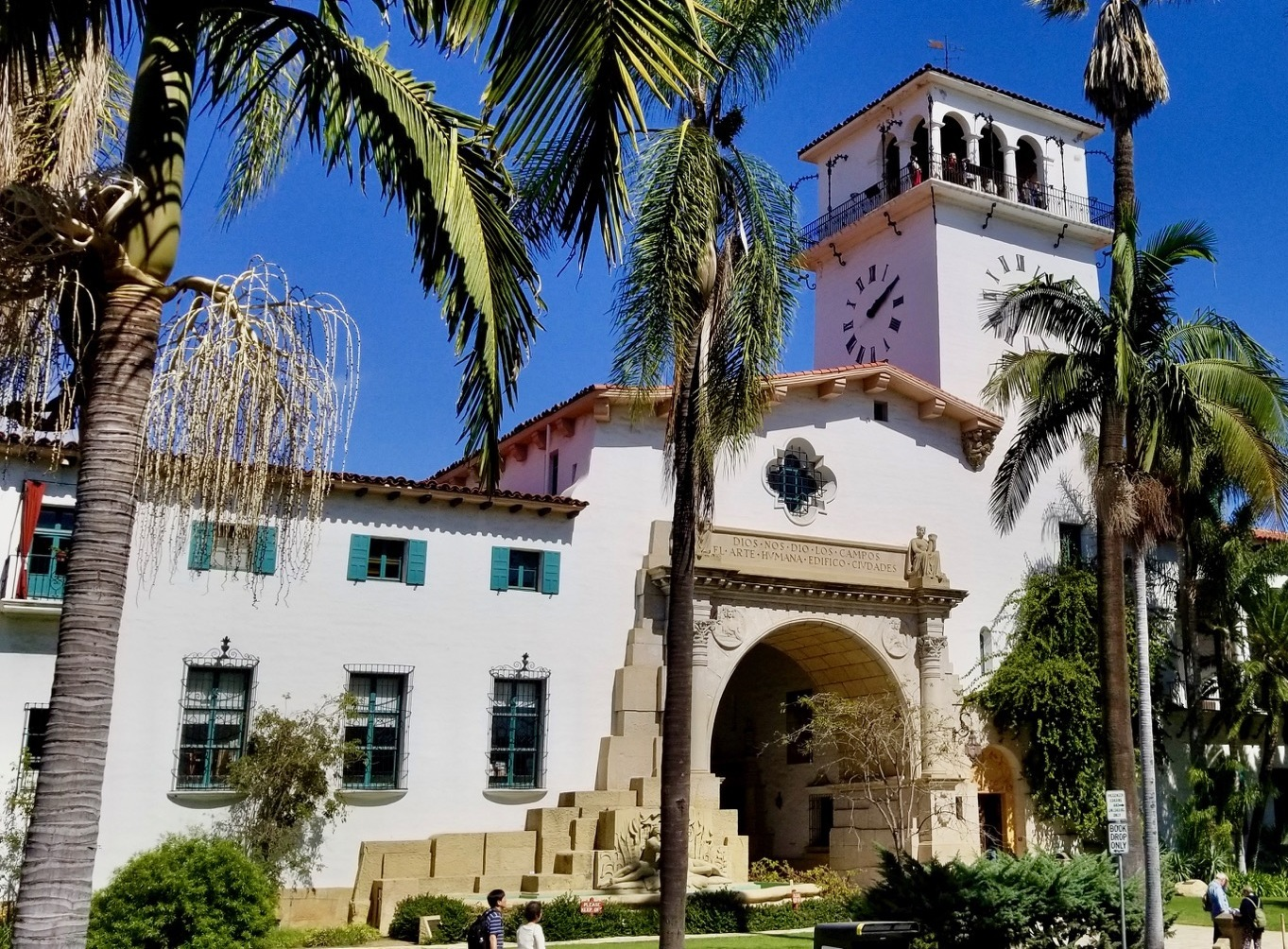
Santa Barbara County Courthouse

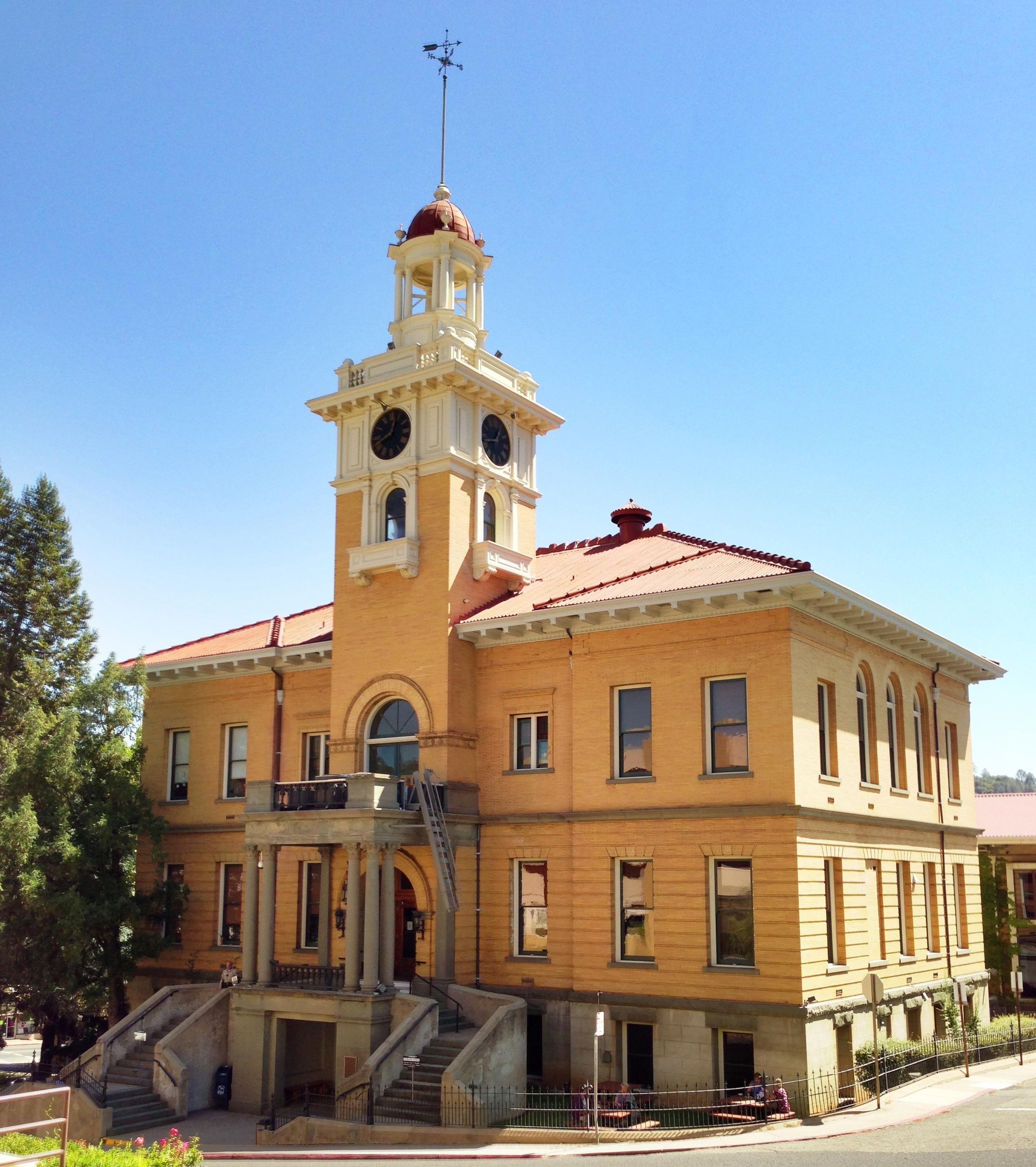
Tuolumne County Courthouse

=== County grand juries ===
California also uses grand juries, with at least one per county. These county-level grand juries are often called civil grand juries because their primary focus is on oversight of government institutions at the county level and lower. They meet at least once per year.

=== LAFCOs ===
Because of historical problems with fragmentation of local government as a result of the formation of too many special districts by enthusiastic local officials, all counties currently have a corresponding Local Agency Formation Commission (LAFCO), one for each county. A LAFCO regulates the creation of special districts and the annexation of unincorporated land to cities within the county. No incorporated city may cross county boundaries, and special districts that span county lines must be specially approved by the state Legislature.

== Municipalities ==
As of Jan 26, 2022, there were 482 incorporated municipalities in the state. Under California law, the terms "city" and "town" are explicitly interchangeable; the name of an incorporated municipality in the state can either be "City of (Name)" or "Town of (Name)". Counties exercise the powers of cities in unincorporated areas.

=== Municipal government ===
California Counties and municipalities

==== Charter Cities ====
California municipalities are either charter or general-law. General-law municipalities have powers defined by the state's Government Code; The California Constitution gives cities the power to become charter cities. charter municipalities may have increased powers, but the adoption or amendment of a city charter requires a popular vote. The benefit of becoming a charter city is that charter cities have supreme authority over “municipal affairs.” In other words, a charter city’s law concerning a municipal affair will trump a state law governing the same topic. According the California League of Cities, there are currently 121 charter cities in California. Being a charter city grants the municipality the flexibility and autonomy to address its unique challenges.

Most small cities have a council–manager government, where the elected city council appoints a city manager to supervise the operations of the city. Some larger cities have a mayor–council government, with a directly-elected mayor who oversees the city government. In many council–manager cities, the city council selects one of its members as a mayor, sometimes rotating through the council membership—but this type of mayoral position is primarily ceremonial.

Selection of city halls in California

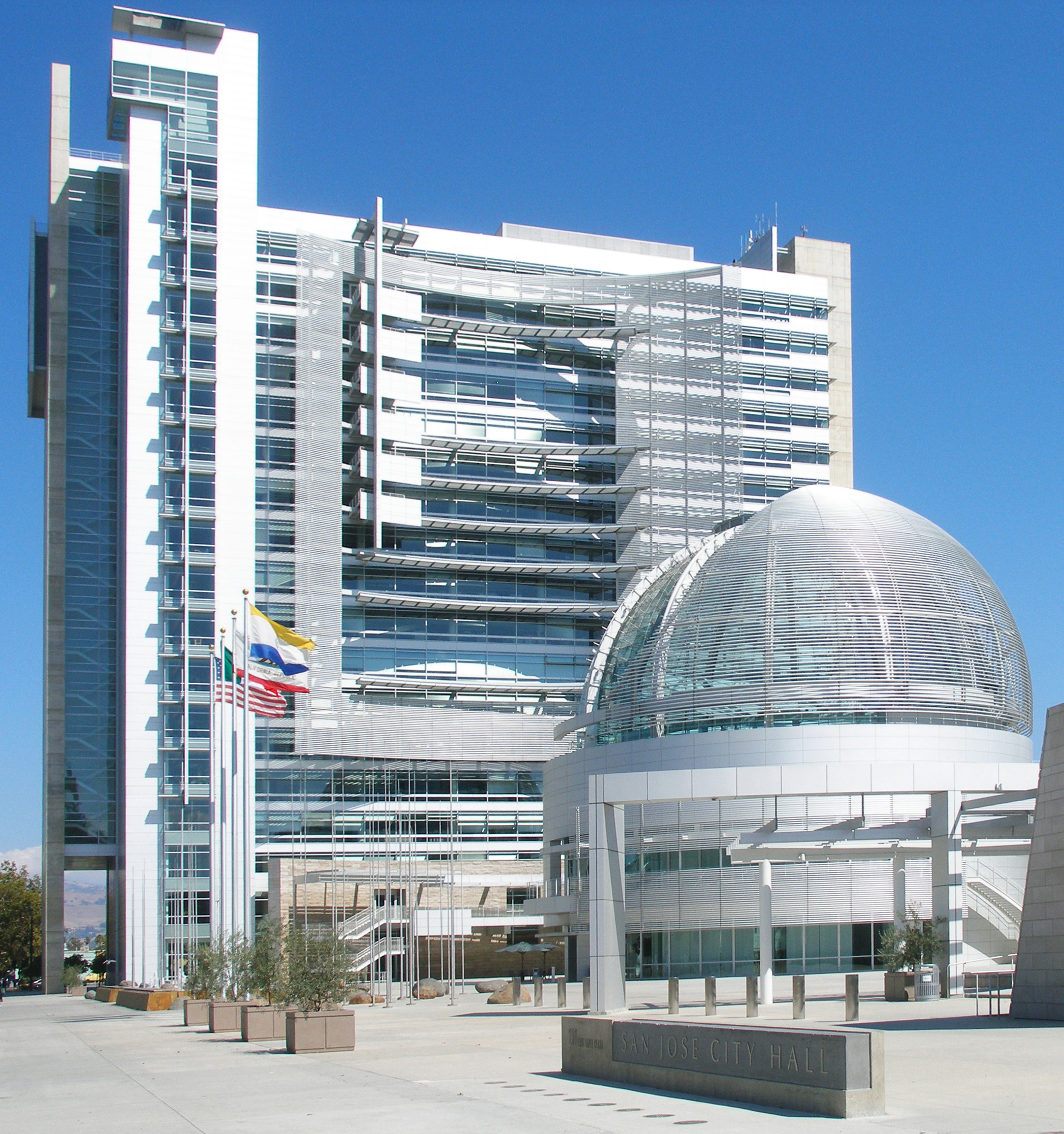
San José City Hall

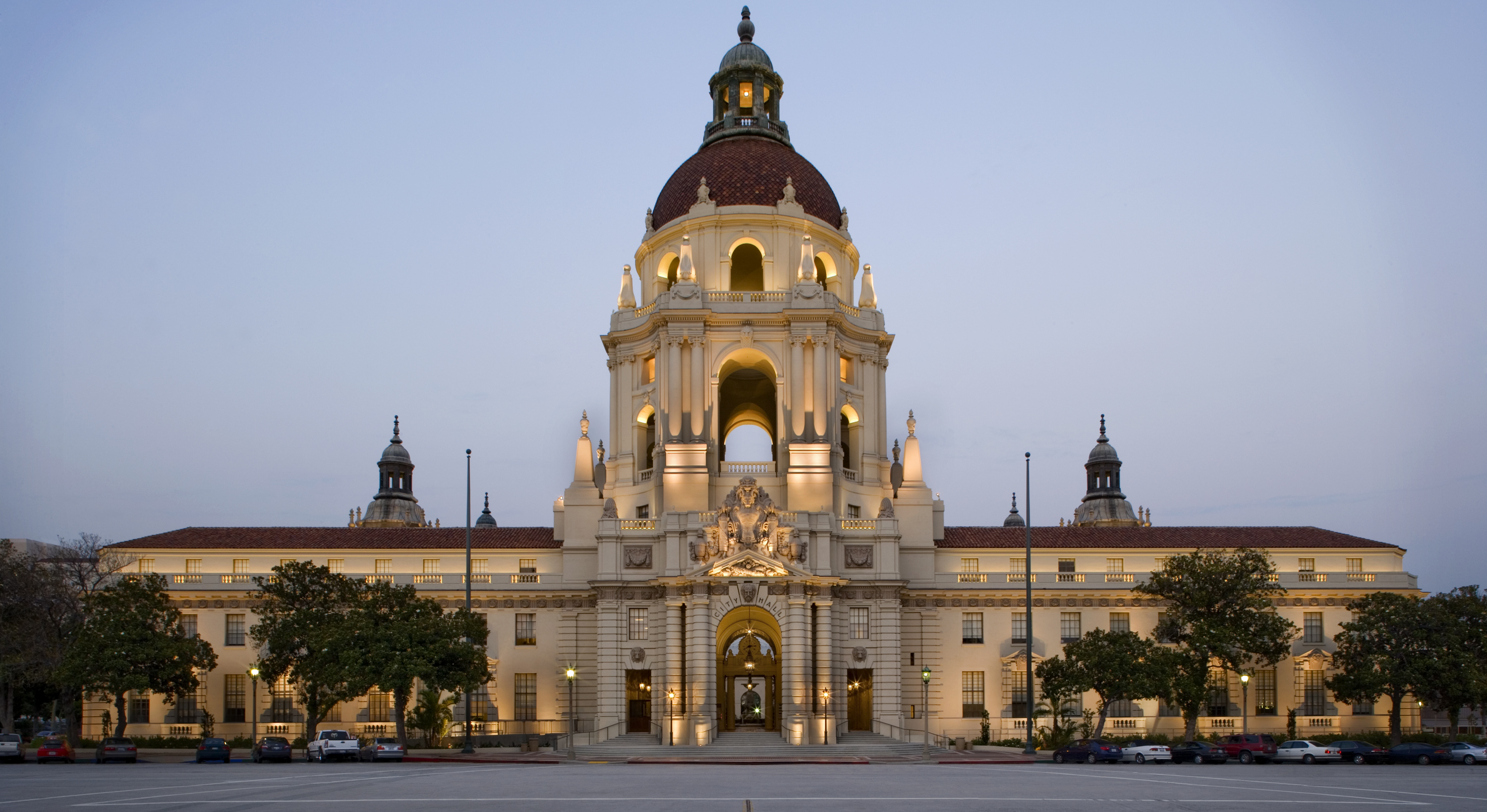
Pasadena City Hall

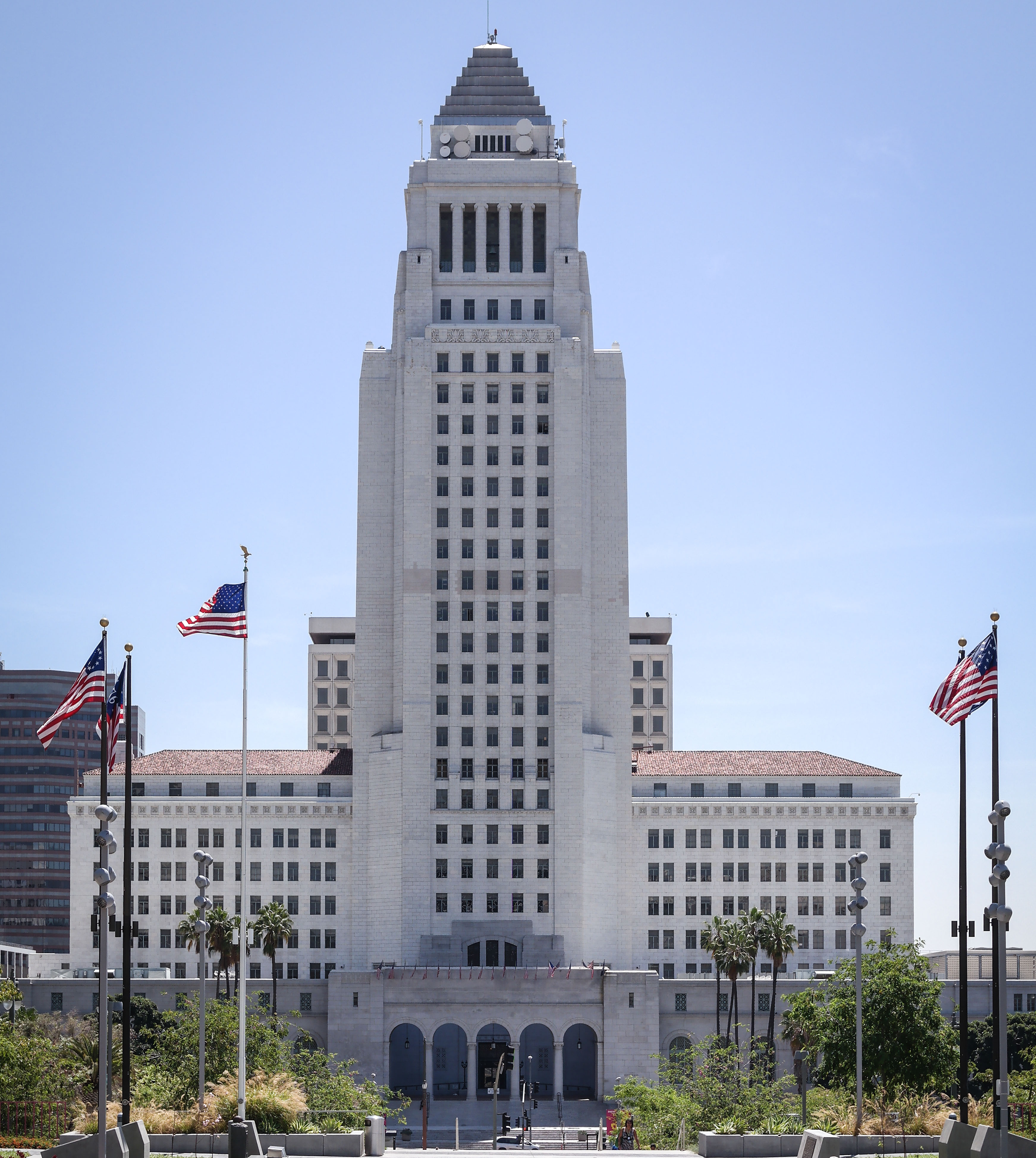
Los Angeles City Hall

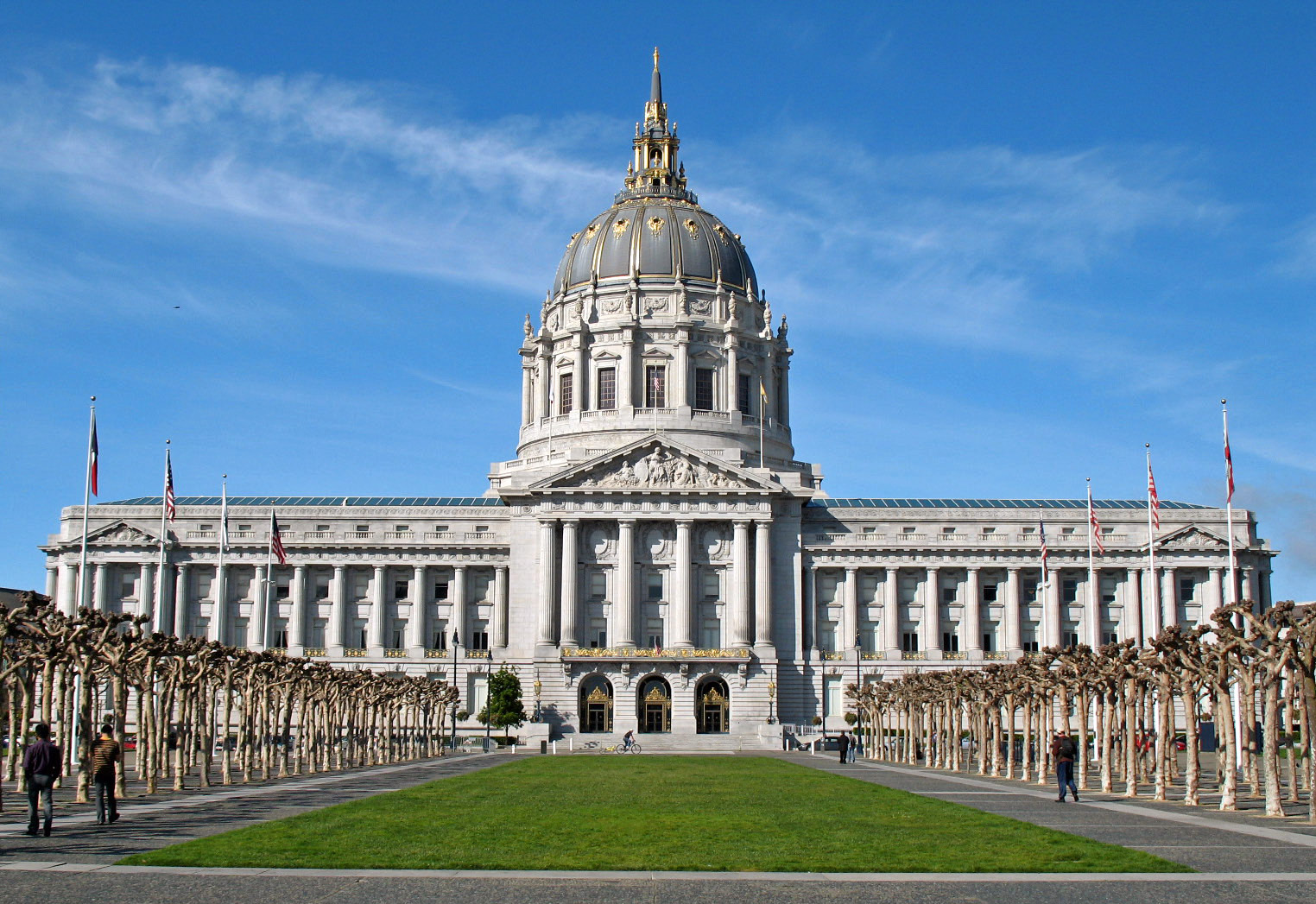
San Francisco City Hall

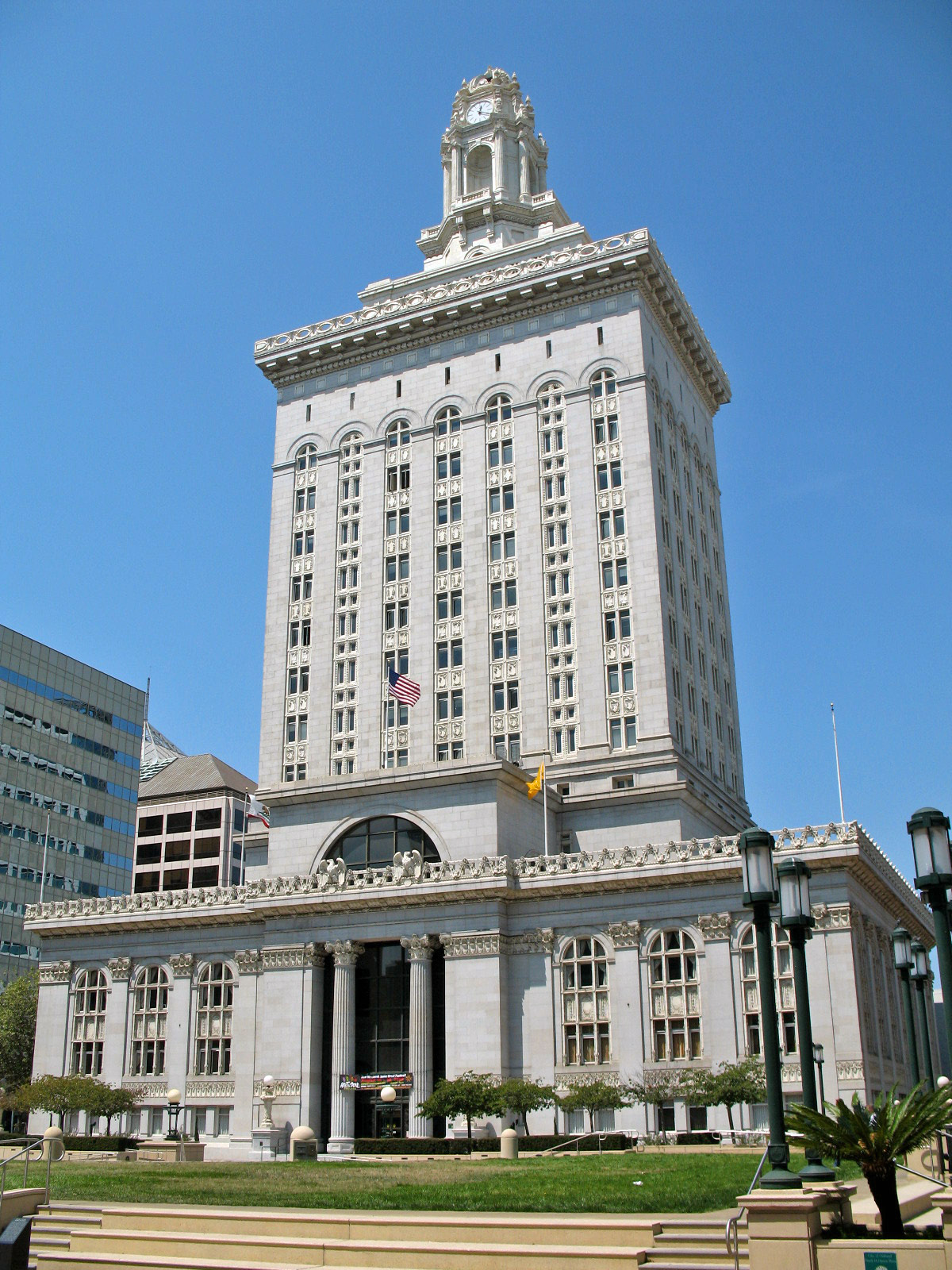
Oakland City Hall

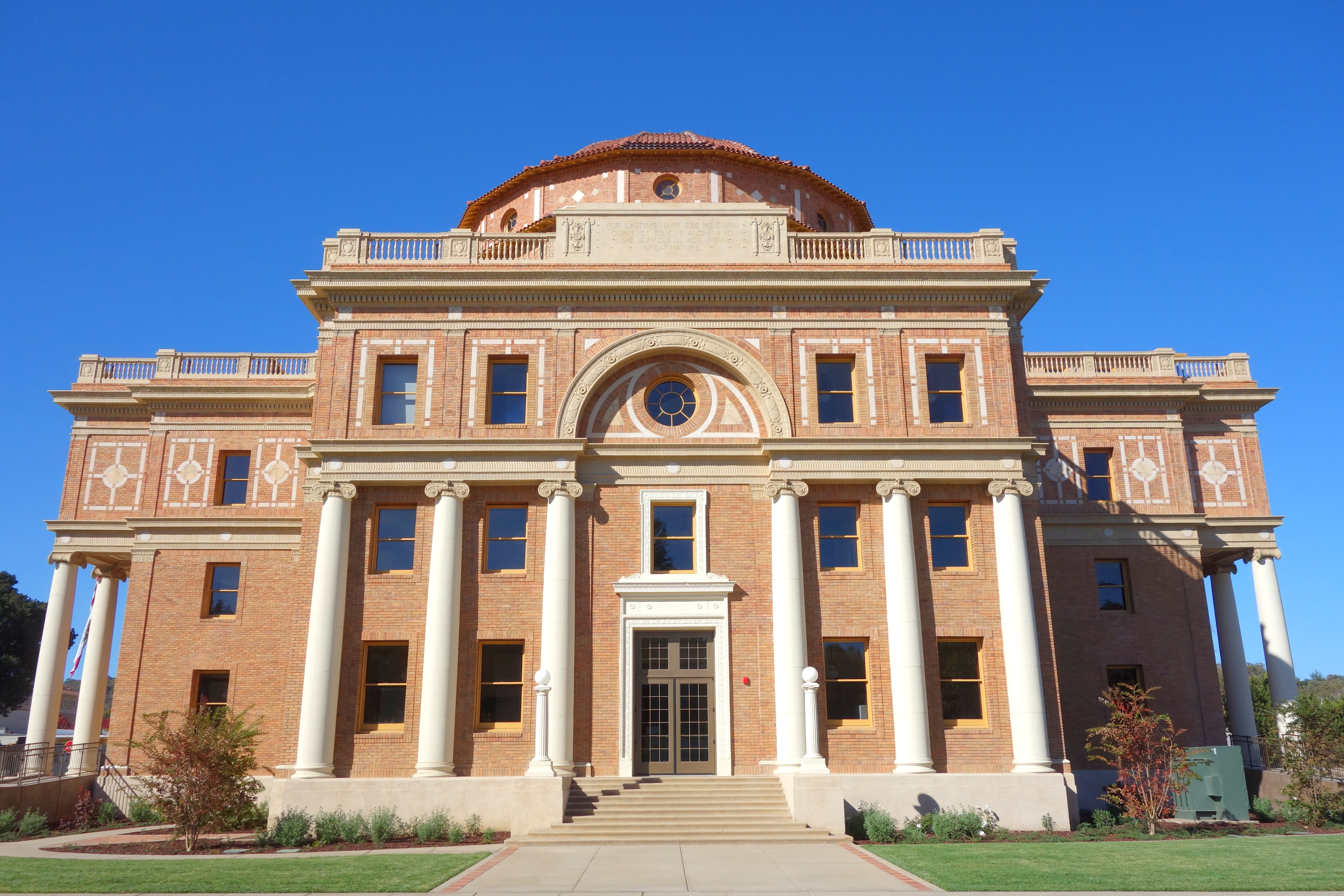
Atascadero City Hall

=== Municipal services ===
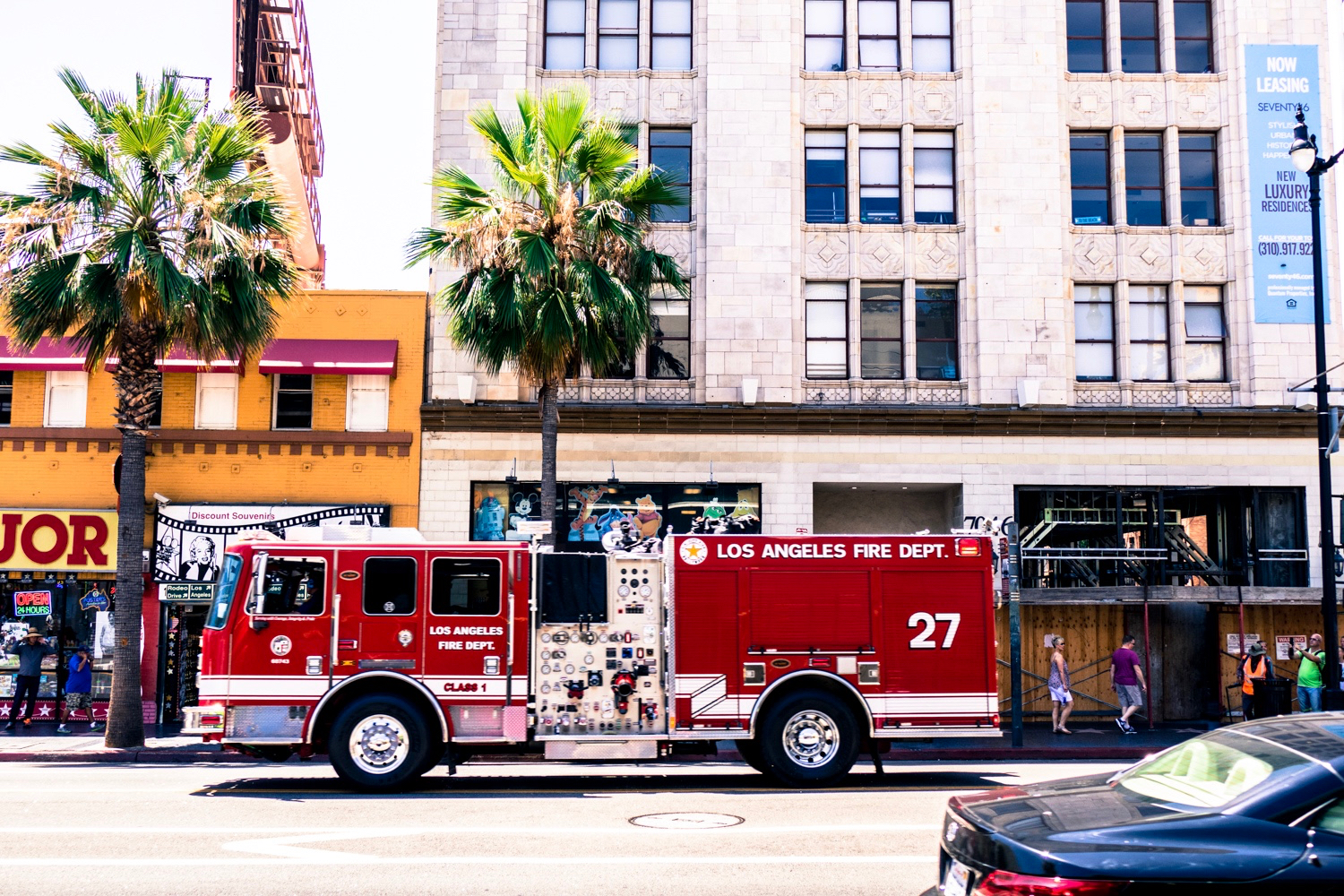
Los Angeles Fire Department (LAFD) is the largest municipal fire department in California.

Incorporated cities and towns have the power to levy taxes. They are responsible for providing police service, zoning, issuing building permits, and maintaining public streets. Municipalities may also provide parks, public housing, and various utility services, though all of these are sometimes provided by special districts, and some utilities are provided privately. Incorporated cities may promulgate ordinances which are usually codified in a city code, and violations of the ordinances are misdemeanor crimes unless otherwise specified as an infraction.

Residents of a sufficiently large piece of unincorporated county land can incorporate a city. The city government then takes some of the tax revenue that would have gone to the county, and can impose additional taxes on its residents. It can then choose to provide almost all the services usually provided by the county (and more), or provide only a few and pay the county to do the rest. A city in this last arrangement is called a contract city; this type of contract is generally known among lawyers as the "Lakewood Plan", because it was pioneered by the city of Lakewood in 1954.

== Educational districts ==
=== School districts ===
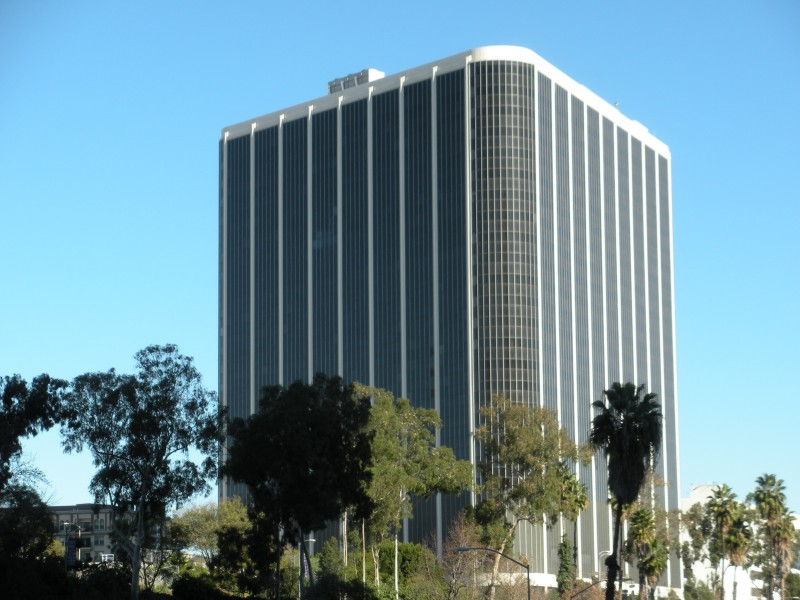
Los Angeles Unified School District is California's largest school district, serving 565,479 students.

Public education of children is provided by school districts, which are governed independently from cities. Each county has a board of education and superintendent that oversee school districts within the county. There are about 1,102 school districts.

California school districts may be organized as elementary districts, high school districts, unified school districts combining elementary and high school grades, or community college districts. Union districts are formed by joining two or more elementary districts. School districts are governed by an elected school board (sometimes called a "board of education" or "board of trustees"), which manages the schools within its jurisdiction. There are also county special service schools and regional occupational programs provide vocational and technical education. Historically, school districts were organized at the primary level (Kindergarten through 8th grade, approximately ages 5–13), and the secondary (high school) level (9th through 12th grade, approximately ages 14–17).

School district and community college district boards may determine their own fiscal requirements—the counties levy and collect the taxes required, possibly subject to constitutional tax limitations and voter approval. Historically, school districts were funded through local property tax revenue, but due to Serrano v. Priest, school districts are funded through the State government through various funding formulas that allocate local property tax revenues and other revenue.

=== Community college districts ===
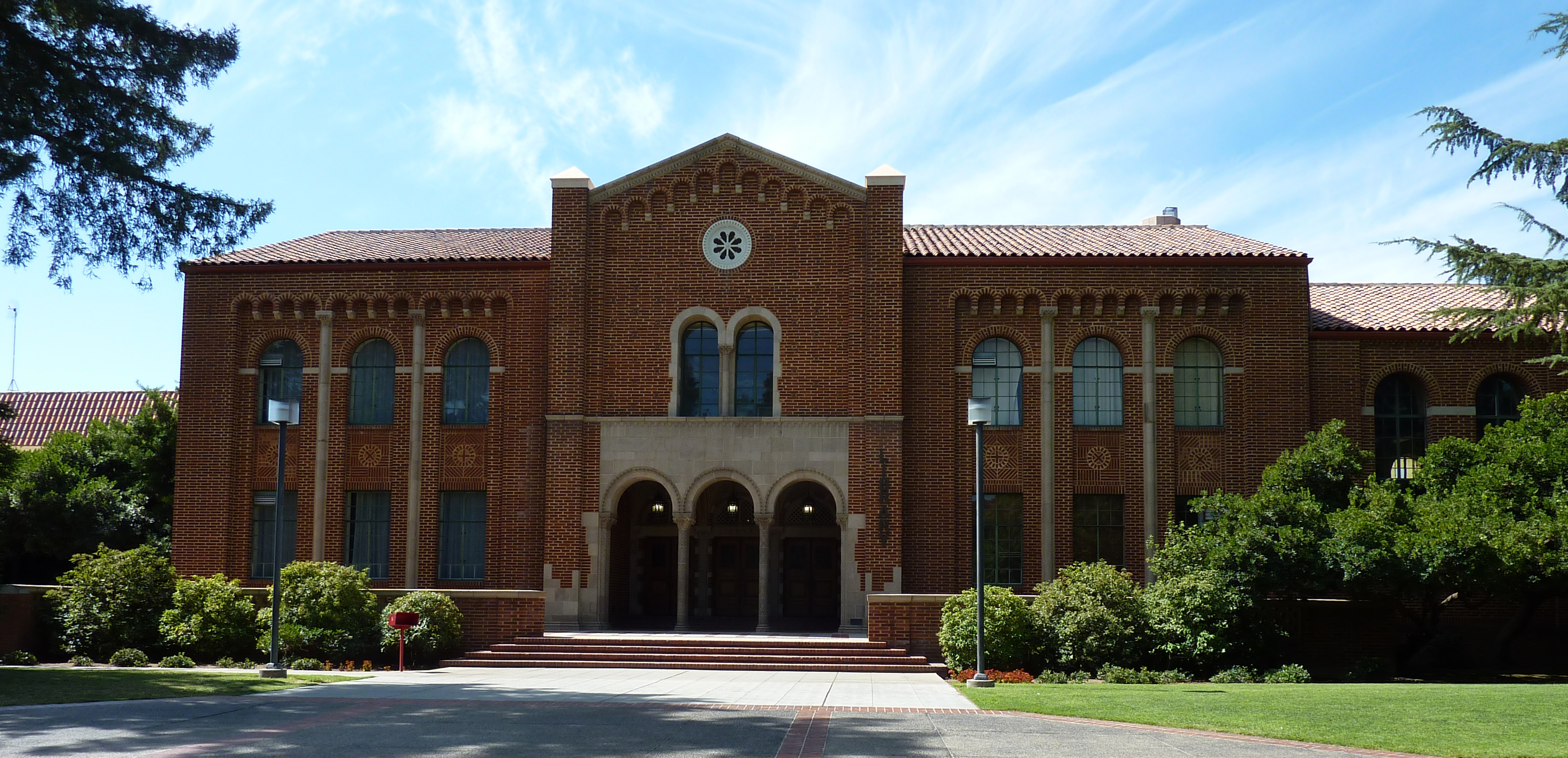
Fresno City College (est. 1910) is the oldest campus of the California Community Colleges System.

The State of California operates the University of California and the California State University as statewide systems. However, community colleges, which provide the first two years of post-secondary education and adult vocational courses, are organized in community college districts, which operate one or more community colleges within their jurisdiction. Community college districts in California are governed by elected boards.

California's first community colleges were established as extensions of high schools. Through legislation enacted in 1907, high schools were allowed to create "junior colleges" to provide a general undergraduate education to local students, approximating the first two years of university courses. In the early 1920s, the Legislature authorized the creation of separate colleges, in addition to the programs offered in high schools. In 1967, the Governor and Legislature created the Board of Governors for the Community Colleges to oversee the community colleges and formally established the California Community Colleges System, requiring all areas of the state to be included within a community college district.

== Special districts ==
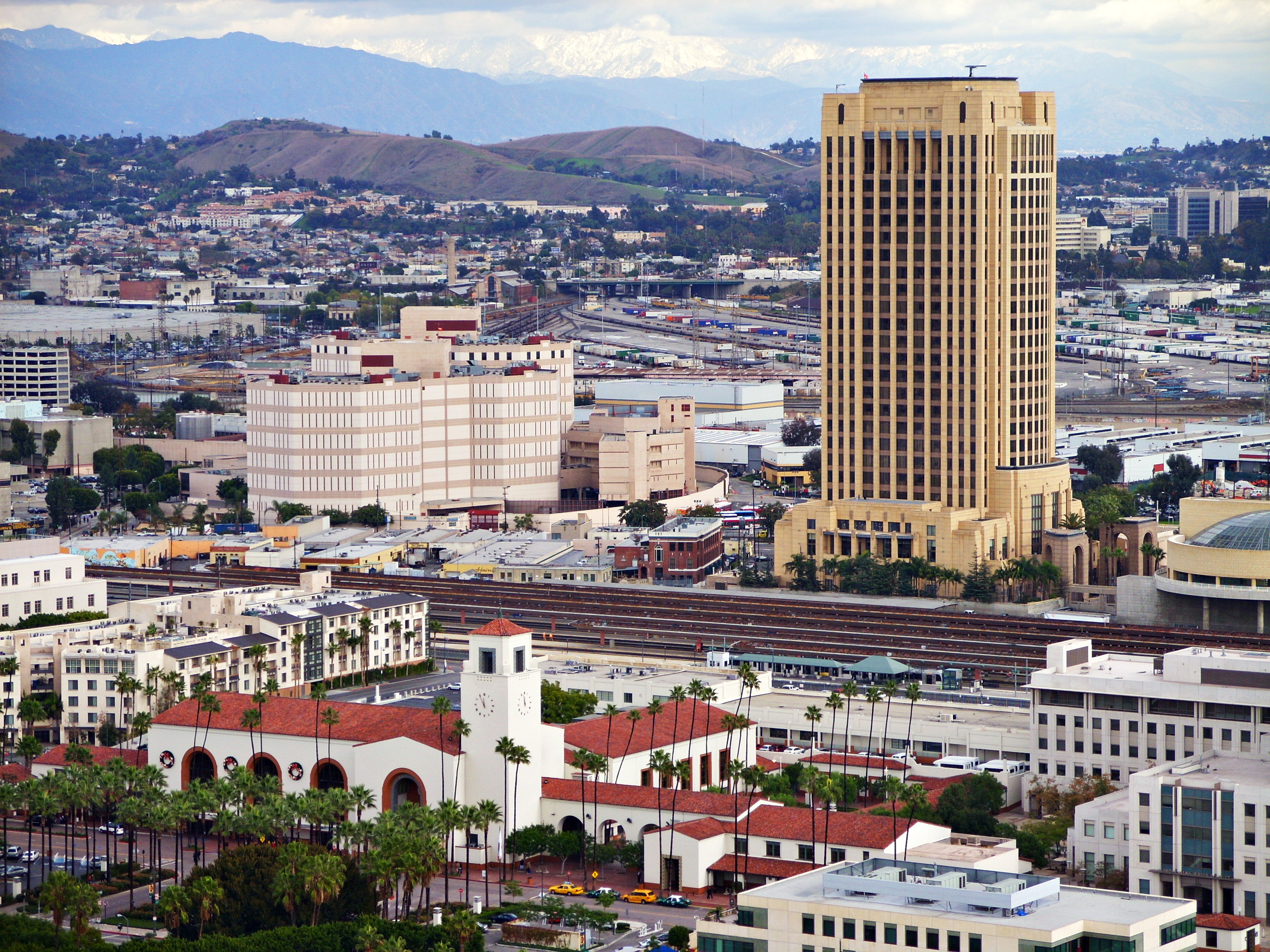
Los Angeles County Metropolitan Transportation Authority is the largest transit agency by ridership in California. Pictured is the Metro Headquarters (right) and Union Station (bottom left), which is owned by Metro.

A special district is defined as "any agency of the state for the local performance of governmental or proprietary functions within limited boundaries" and provides a limited range of services within a defined geographic area. Most of California's special districts are single-purpose districts, and provide one service. Most special districts have no police powers. Notable exceptions are harbor and port districts and police protection districts. All counties have a corresponding Local Agency Formation Commission (LAFCO) that regulates the creation of special districts.

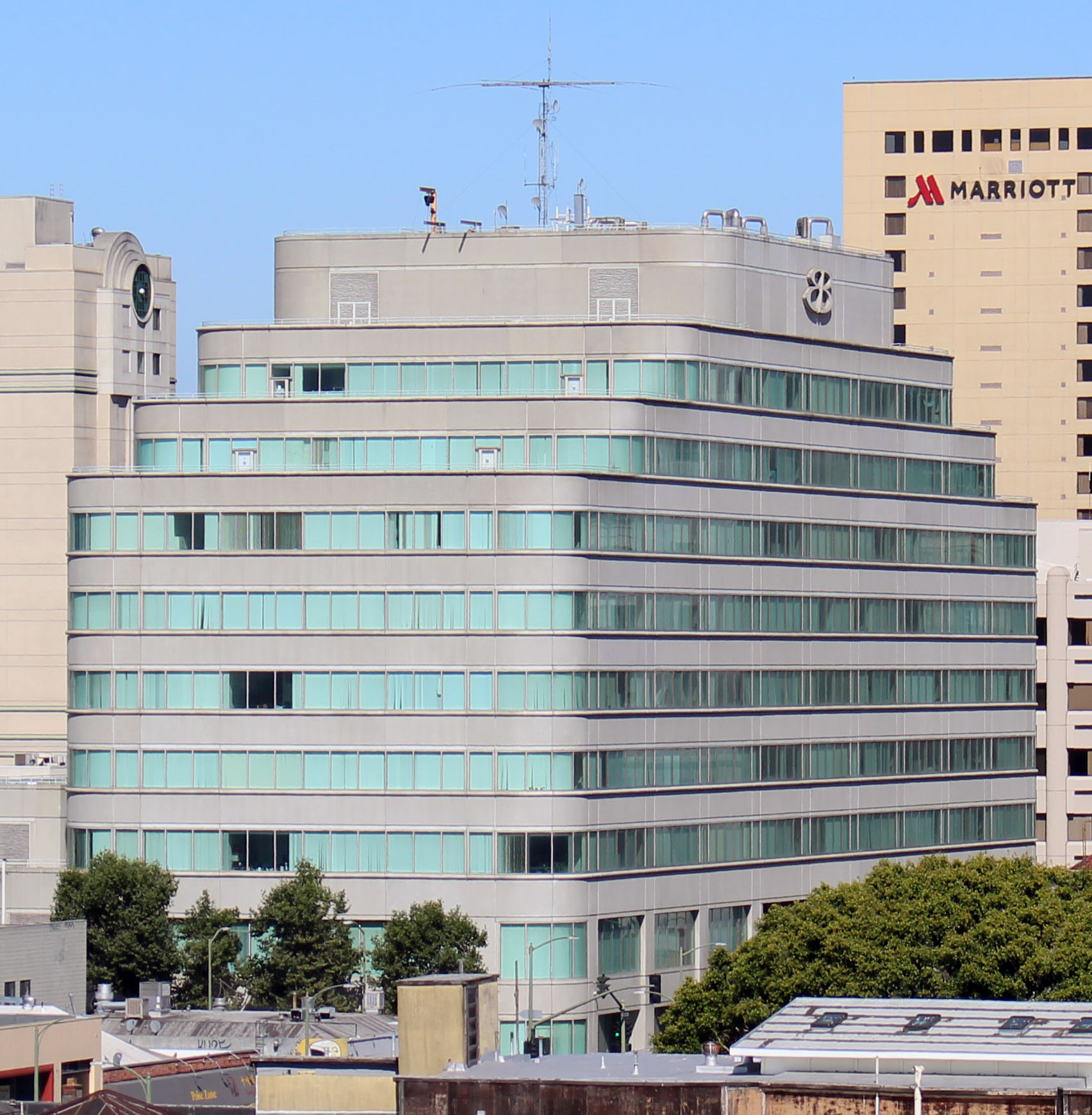
The East Bay Municipal Utility District provides water and sewage services to 1.4 million people in the East Bay subregion in the Bay Area.

Independent special districts have elected boards. Dependent special districts are governed by the city or county that created them. Regional bodies have boards appointed by the city and county governments they encompass. Some districts, often referred to as assessment districts, have voting based on the assessed values of the property contained within the district, rather than a popular vote; that practice was ruled constitutional for districts that provide benefits to the land in rough proportion to the value of the land, rather than to people within the district. (Note: The case was Salyer Land Company v. Tulare Lake Basin Water Storage District (1972).) Districts are categorized as enterprise districts and non-enterprise districts. Enterprise districts operate as a business, and obtain most of their revenue from user fees or sales of a product or service. Enterprise districts include those that provide water, waste disposal, electric power, hospitals, public transit, and similar services.

The most common type of special district is the utility district, which provides public utility services to residents within the district boundaries. Among the largest of these are SMUD, which provides electric power in the Sacramento area; the Metropolitan Water District, which provides water to local water agencies in the Los Angeles area; and the Imperial Irrigation District, which provides water for agriculture and electric power in Imperial County. Another very common type of special district is the transit agency, which provides public transportation. The L.A. Metro (a county transportation commission) provides bus and train services and funds some transportation projects, including bicycle paths, HOV lanes, and other road improvements. By contrast, BART (a transit district) only operates a commuter rail service and buses to locations beyond the range of the rail service.

As of 2017, there are 2,894 special districts in California. A majority, 86 percent, provide a single function. Fire protection, water supply, natural resources, and cemeteries are the most abundant. In Fiscal Year 2019-20, special districts reported $79.67 billion in revenues and $76.29 billion in expenditures. A partial list of the types of special districts includes:

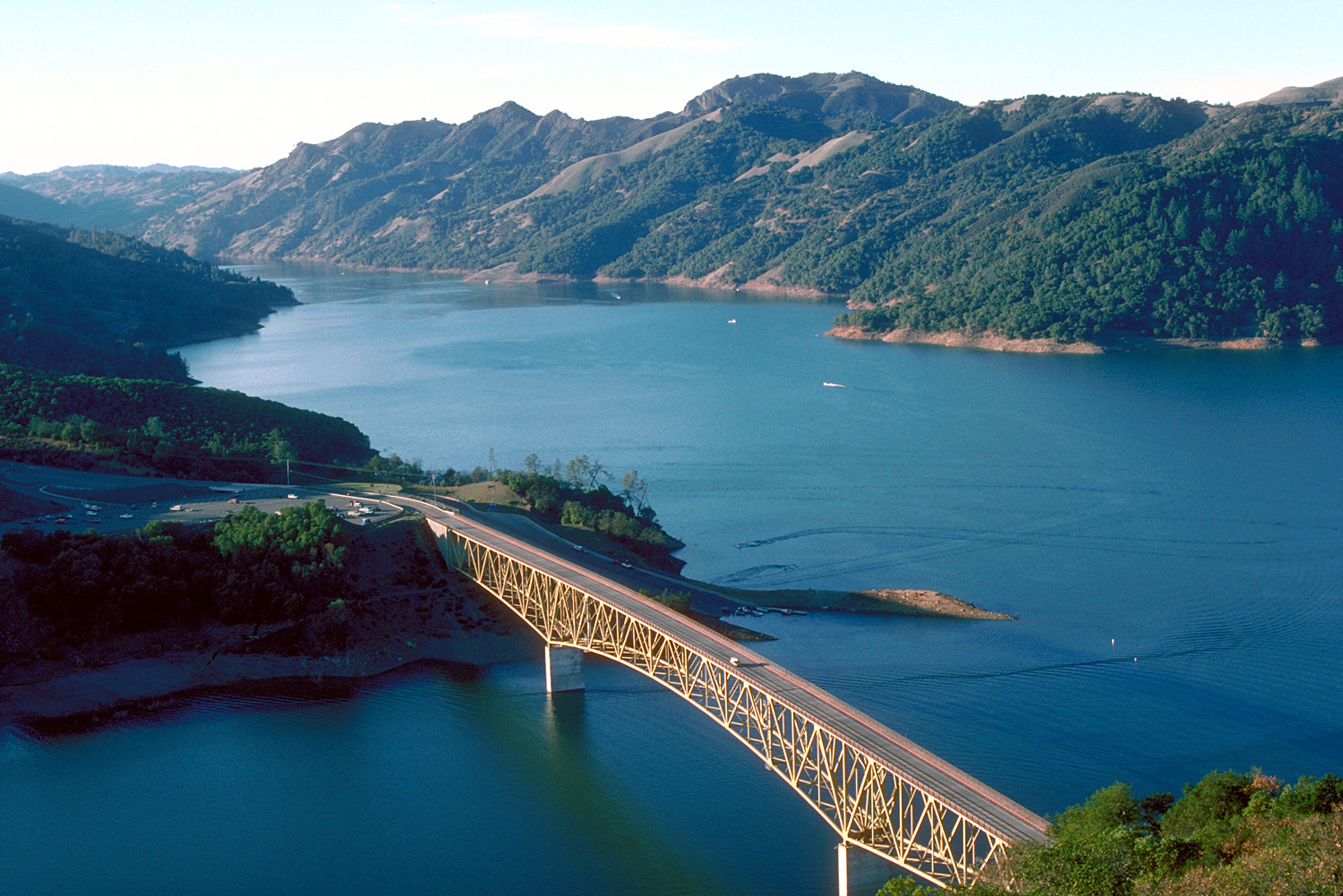
Lake Sonoma, a reservoir of the Sonoma County Water Agency

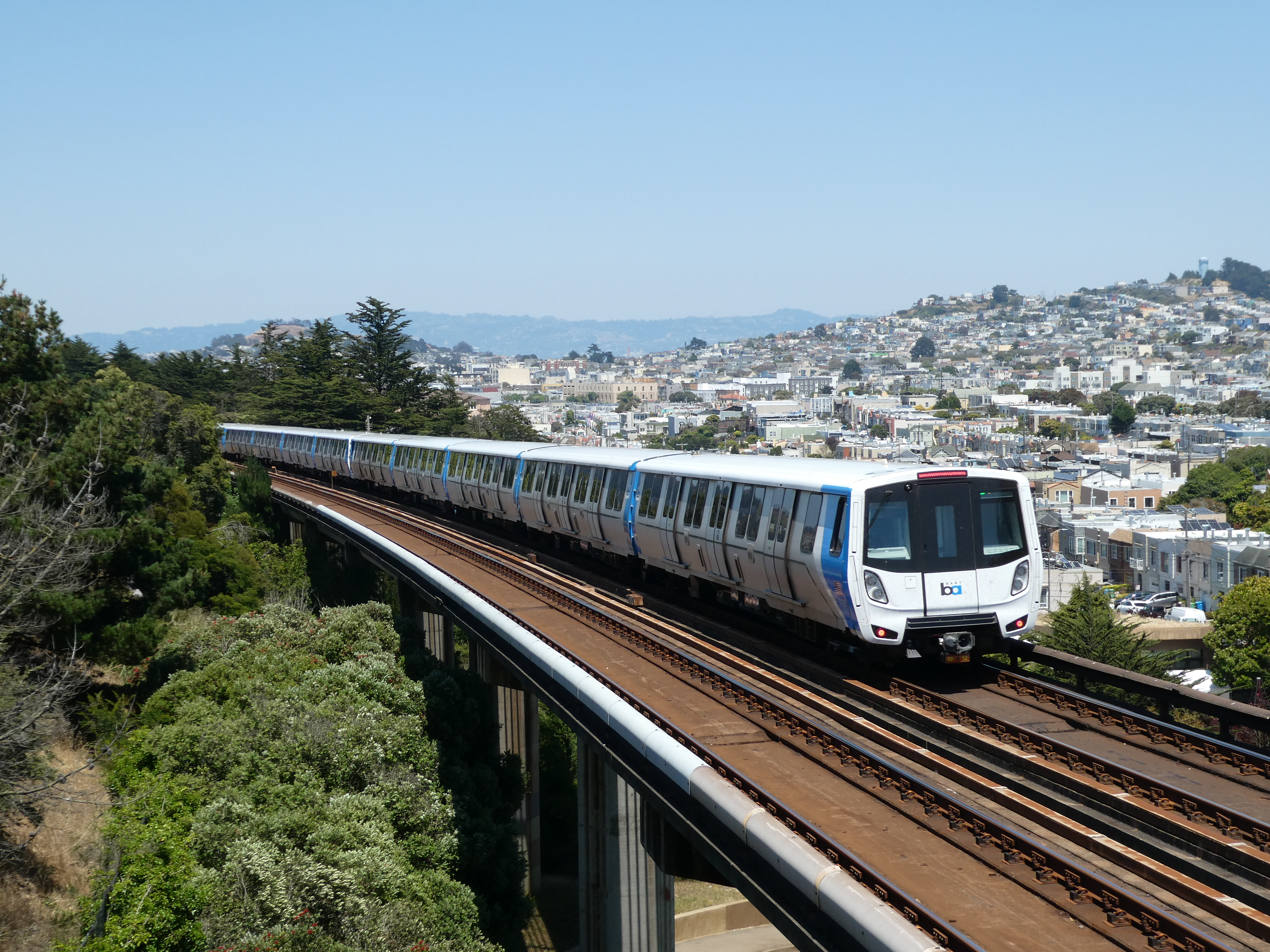
BART is operated by the Bay Area Rapid Transit District

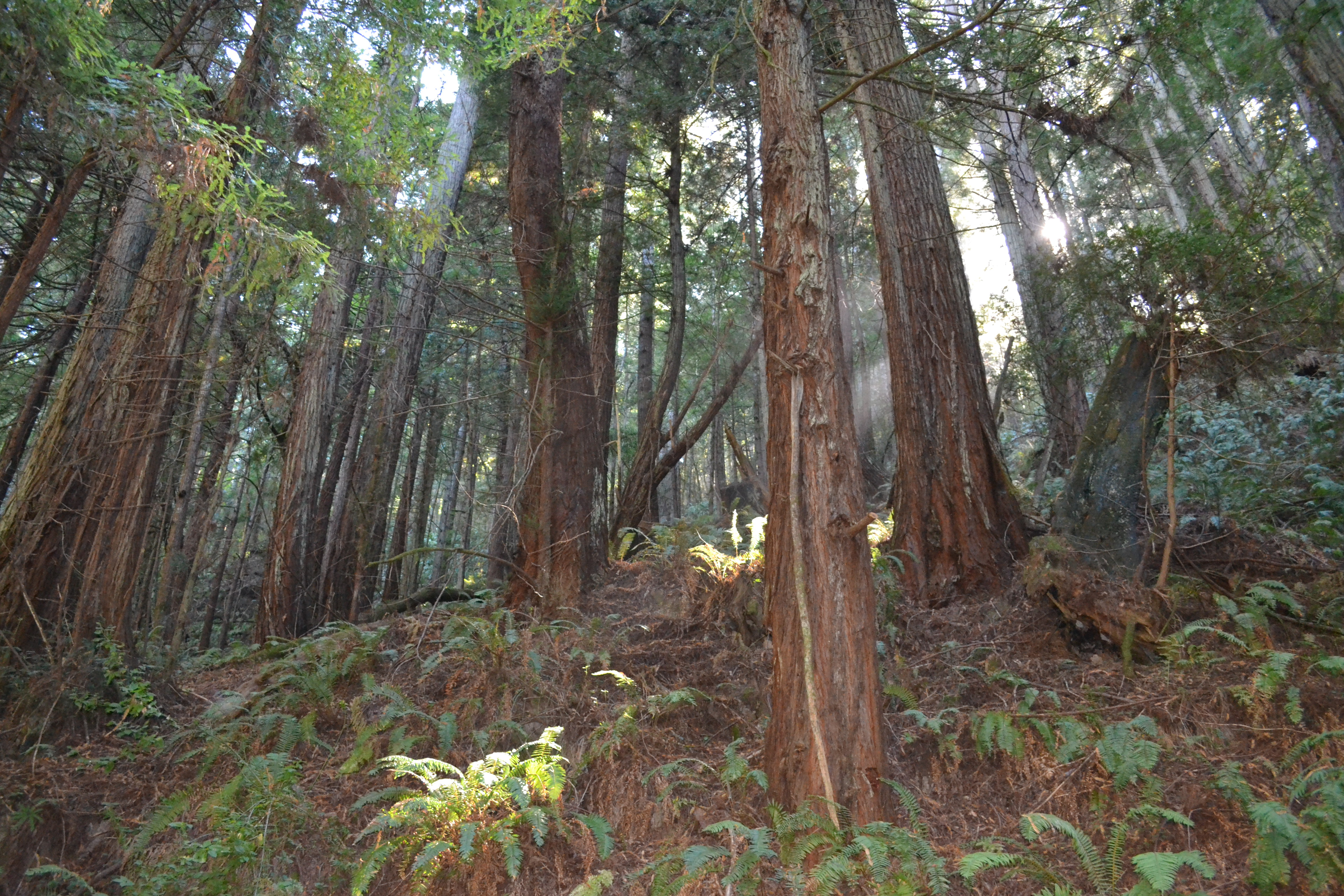
Purisima Creek Redwoods Preserve, managed by Midpeninsula Regional Open Space District

Commonly independent

- Air pollution control or air quality management districts
- Airport districts
- Bridge or highway districts, such as Golden Gate Bridge, Highway and Transportation District
- California water districts
- Community services districts (CSD): special districts providing multiple services, often for unincorporated communities, such as Vandenberg Village CSD for Vandenberg Village
- County sanitation districts
- Fire protection districts
- Harbor and port districts
- California health care districts
- Irrigation districts
- Library districts
- Metropolitan water districts
- Mosquito abatement districts
- Municipal utility districts
- Municipal water districts
- Pest control districts
- Police protection districts
- Public utility districts
- Recreation and park districts
- Resource conservation districts
- Sanitary districts
- Sewer districts
- Transit or rapid transit districts, such as Santa Clara Valley Transportation Authority, and Bay Area Rapid Transit District
- Vector control districts

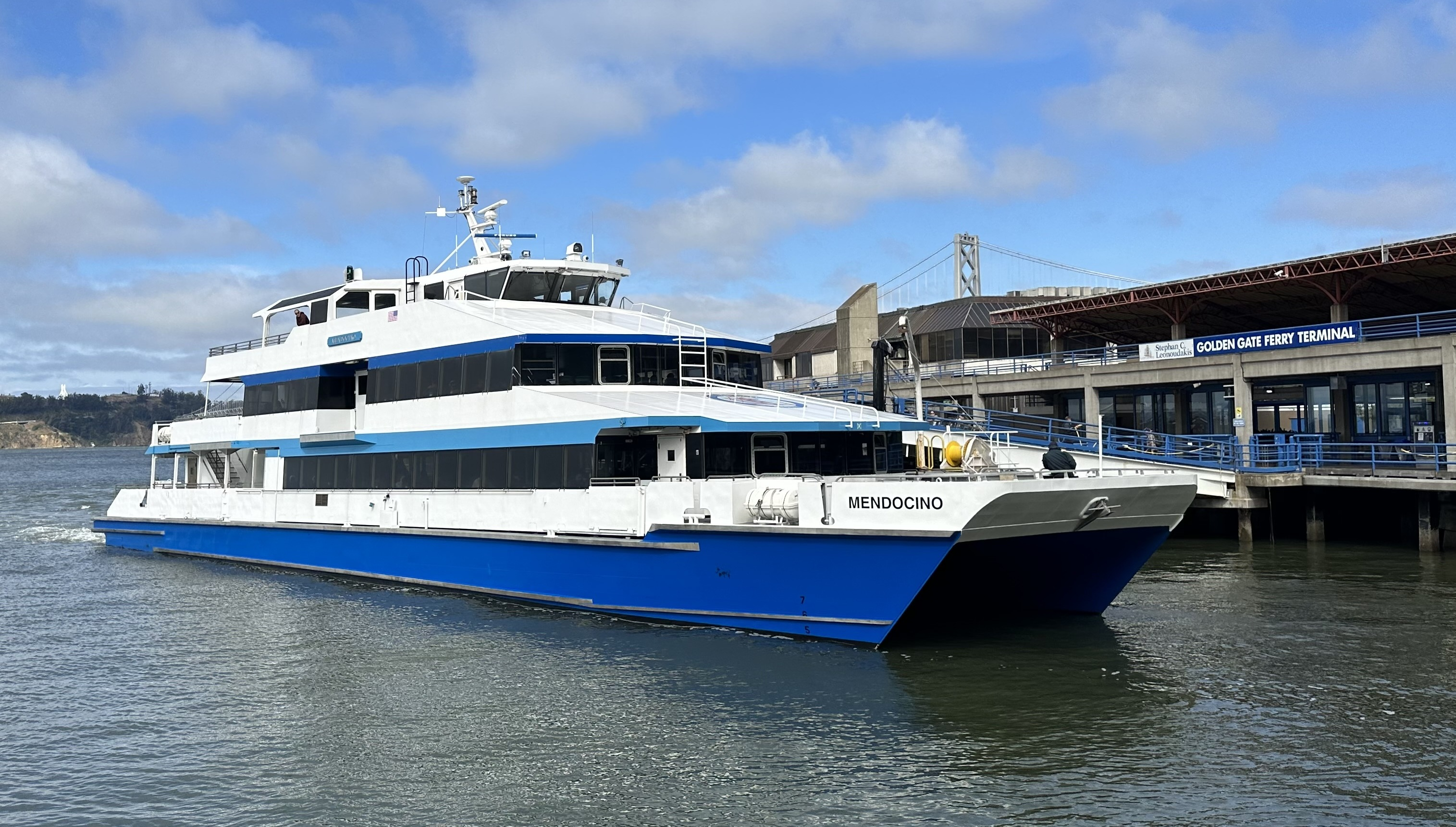
Golden Gate Bridge, Highway & Transportation District runs the Golden Gate Ferry in San Francisco Bay

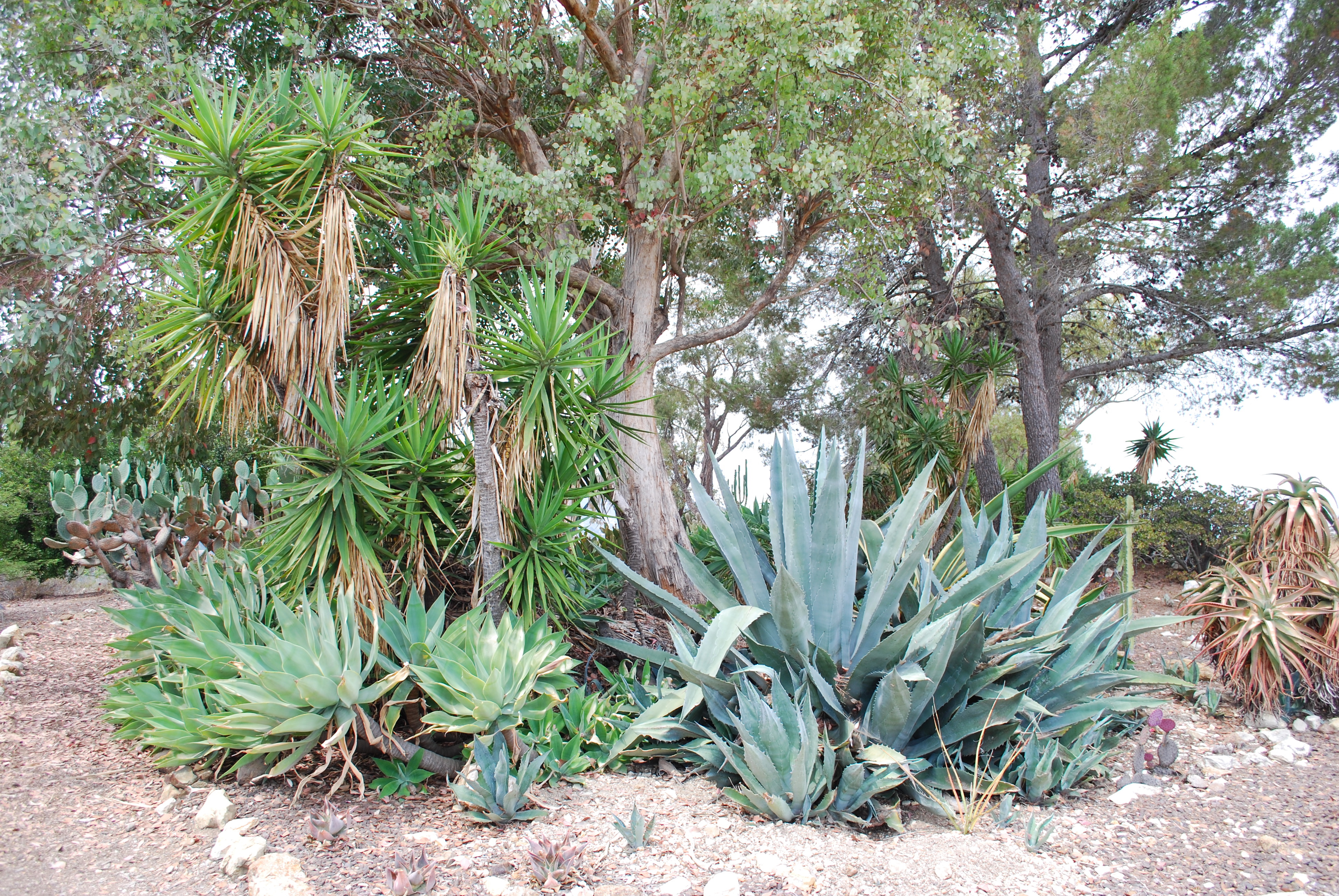
Conejo Valley Botanic Garden, managed by the Conejo Recreation and Park District

Dependent

- Mello-Roos (community facilities districts)
- County service areas
- County water districts
- County waterworks districts
- Improvement districts
- Joint power agencies
- Joint highway districts
- Local agency formation commissions
- Permanent road divisions
- Public cemetery districts
- Reclamation districts
- Redevelopment agencies
- Regional water quality control boards
- Separation of grade districts
- Service authority for freeways and expressways (SAFE), responsible for call boxes
- Service zones of special districts
- Sewer maintenance districts
- Special assessment districts
- Unified or union high school library districts

== See also ==
- Brown Act
- California Public Records Act

By county

- Alameda
- Fresno
- Los Angeles
- Orange
- Sacramento
- San Diego
- San Francisco
- San Joaquin
- Solano
- Stanislaus

County boards of supervisors

- Alameda
- Butte
- Contra Costa
- El Dorado
- Fresno
- Imperial
- Kern
- Los Angeles
- Marin
- Merced
- Monterey
- Nevada
- Orange
- Plumas
- Riverside
- Sacramento
- San Bernardino
- San Diego
- San Francisco
- San Joaquin
- San Luis Obispo
- San Mateo
- Santa Clara
- Santa Cruz
- Sonoma
- Stanislaus
- Ventura

By city

- Los Angeles
- Sacramento
- San Francisco
- San Jose
