= Government of Sacramento County, California =

The government of Sacramento County operates as a charter county under the California Constitution, California law, and the Charter of the County of Sacramento. Much of the government of California is in practice the responsibility of county governments such as Sacramento County. The county government provides countywide services such as elections and voter registration, law enforcement, jails, vital records, property records, tax collection, public health, and social services. In addition the county serves as the local government for all unincorporated areas.

It is governed by an elected five-member Board of Supervisors. Several other elected offices including the Sheriff, District Attorney, and Assessor, and numerous county departments and entities, under the supervision of the County Executive Officer, are responsible for implementing the policy of the Board of Supervisors.

Some chartered cities within the county, such as Sacramento and Folsom, provide municipal services such as police, public safety, libraries, parks and recreation, and zoning. Other cities, such as Rancho Cordova and Isleton, arrange to have the County provide some or all of these services on a contract basis. In addition, several entities of the State of California have jurisdiction conterminous with the County of Sacramento, such as the Sacramento County Superior Court.

== Organization ==
=== Board of Supervisors ===
Under its foundational Charter, the five-member elected Sacramento County Board of Supervisors (BOS) is the county legislature. The board operates in a legislative, executive, and quasi-judicial capacity. As a legislative authority, it can pass ordinances for the unincorporated areas (ordinances that affect the whole county, like posting of restaurant ratings, must be ratified by the individual city). As an executive body, it can tell the county departments what to do, and how to do it. As a quasi-judicial body, the Board is the final venue of appeal in the local planning process.

The current members are:

- Phil Serna—District 1
- Patrick Kennedy—District 2
- Rich Desmond—District 3
- Sue Frost—District 4
- Pat Hume—District 5

=== Elected officers ===
In addition to the Board of Supervisors, there are several elected officers that form the Government of Sacramento County that are required by the California Constitution and California law, and authorized under the Charter.

The Sacramento County Sheriff's Department provides general-service law enforcement to unincorporated areas of Sacramento County, serving as the equivalent of the county police for unincorporated areas of the county, as well as incorporated cities within the county who have contracted with the agency for law-enforcement services (known as "contract cities").

The Sacramento County District Attorney prosecutes felony and misdemeanor crimes that occur within the jurisdiction of Sacramento County.

The Sacramento County Assessor determines the assessed valuation of property in the county.

The Sacramento County Board of Education is composed of seven elected members who serve four-year terms. It governs the Sacramento County Office of Education (SCOE), and appoints the Sacramento County Superintendent of Schools who is also its secretary.

=== Other departments ===
The Board of Supervisors appoints the appoint the County Executive, the Board of Law Library Trustees, the Civil Service Commission, and the County Counsel.

The County Executive (County Executive Officer or CEO) plans, organizes, directs controls and coordinates County activities. The CEO appoints the:

- Coroner
- Surveyor
- County Engineer
- Tax Collector
- License Collector
- County Clerk
- Public Administrator
- Director of Finance
- Recorder
- Agricultural Commissioner and Sealer of Weights and Measures
- County Librarian
- Purchasing Agent

The Sacramento County Probation Department, under the Chief Probation Officer, supervises adult and juvenile offenders granted probation with Sacramento County.

The Department of Health and Human Services (DHHS) operates health, social, and mental health services for Sacramento County.

The Department of Human Assistance (DHA) administers multiple California welfare programs within Sacramento County, including Medi-Cal, CalFresh, CalWORKs, general assistance, a Medically Indigent Service Program (MISP), and recently a Low Income Health Program (LIHP) Medicaid Coverage Expansion (MCE) program.

The Department of Community Development interprets/enforces California Building Codes for privately owned buildings and structures including commercial and residential new buildings, alterations, additions and/or repairs within Sacramento County’s unincorporated area, investigates housing, zoning and vehicle abatement laws in the unincorporated Sacramento County, performs County Surveyor functions, and oversees most aspects of local land use planning in the unincorporated area of Sacramento County.

The Department of Water Resources provides drainage, flood control and water supply services to various service areas of unincorporated Sacramento County and the Cities of Citrus Heights, Elk Grove and Rancho Cordova.

== Law ==
The Sacramento County Code is the codified law of the County in the form of ordinances passed by the Board of Supervisors. Every act prohibited or declared unlawful, and every failure to perform an act required, by the ordinances are misdemeanor crimes, unless otherwise specified as infractions.

== History ==
The current charter was proposed by the Sacramento County Board of Supervisors and ratified by the electorate on February 18, 1933 and became effective July 1, 1933.

== Other governments ==
=== State of California ===
The Sacramento County Superior Court, which covers the entire county, is not a County department but a division of the State's trial court system. Historically, the courthouses were county-owned buildings that were maintained at county expense, which created significant friction since the trial court judges, as officials of the state government, had to lobby the county Board of Supervisors for facility renovations and upgrades. In turn, the state judiciary successfully persuaded the state Legislature to authorize the transfer of all courthouses to the state government in 2008 and 2009 (so that judges would have direct control over their own courthouses). Courthouse security is still provided by the county government under a contract with the state.

=== City of Sacramento ===
The City of Sacramento operates as a charter city (as opposed to a general law city) under the City of Sacramento Charter. The elected government is composed of the Sacramento City Council with 8 city council districts and the Mayor of Sacramento, which operate under a mayor-council government. In addition, there are numerous departments and appointed officers such as the City Manager, Sacramento Police Department (SPD), the Sacramento Fire Department (SFD), Community Development Department, City Clerk, City Attorney, and City Treasurer. As of December 2024 the current mayor is Kevin McCarty and the current councillors are:

- Lisa Kaplan—District 1
- Roger Dickinson—District 2
- Karina Talamantes—District 3
- Phil Pluckebaum—District 4
- Caity Maple—District 5
- Eric Guerra—District 6
- Rick Jennings—District 7
- Mai Vang—District 8

=== School districts ===
Sacramento County is mostly covered by the Los Rios Community College District, but also includes parts of the San Joaquin Delta Community College District around Isleton.

=== Special Districts ===
The Sacramento Local Agency Formation Commission (SacLAFCo) is the Local Agency Formation Commission (LAFCo) for Sacramento County and regulates special districts.

The Sacramento Regional Transit District (RT) is responsible for public transportation and is governed by an eleven-member Board of Directors composed of members of the Sacramento, Elk Grove, Citrus Heights, Rancho Cordova, and Folsom City Councils as well as members of the Sacramento County Board of Supervisors.

Electricity for the county is provided by the Sacramento Municipal Utility District. The district is governed by a seven-member Board of Directors, and each member is elected by residents in a "ward" or constituency for four-year terms.
