= Pioneer Mutual Volunteer Firehouse =

Historical Landmark in Sacramento, United States

Pioneer Firehouse Site
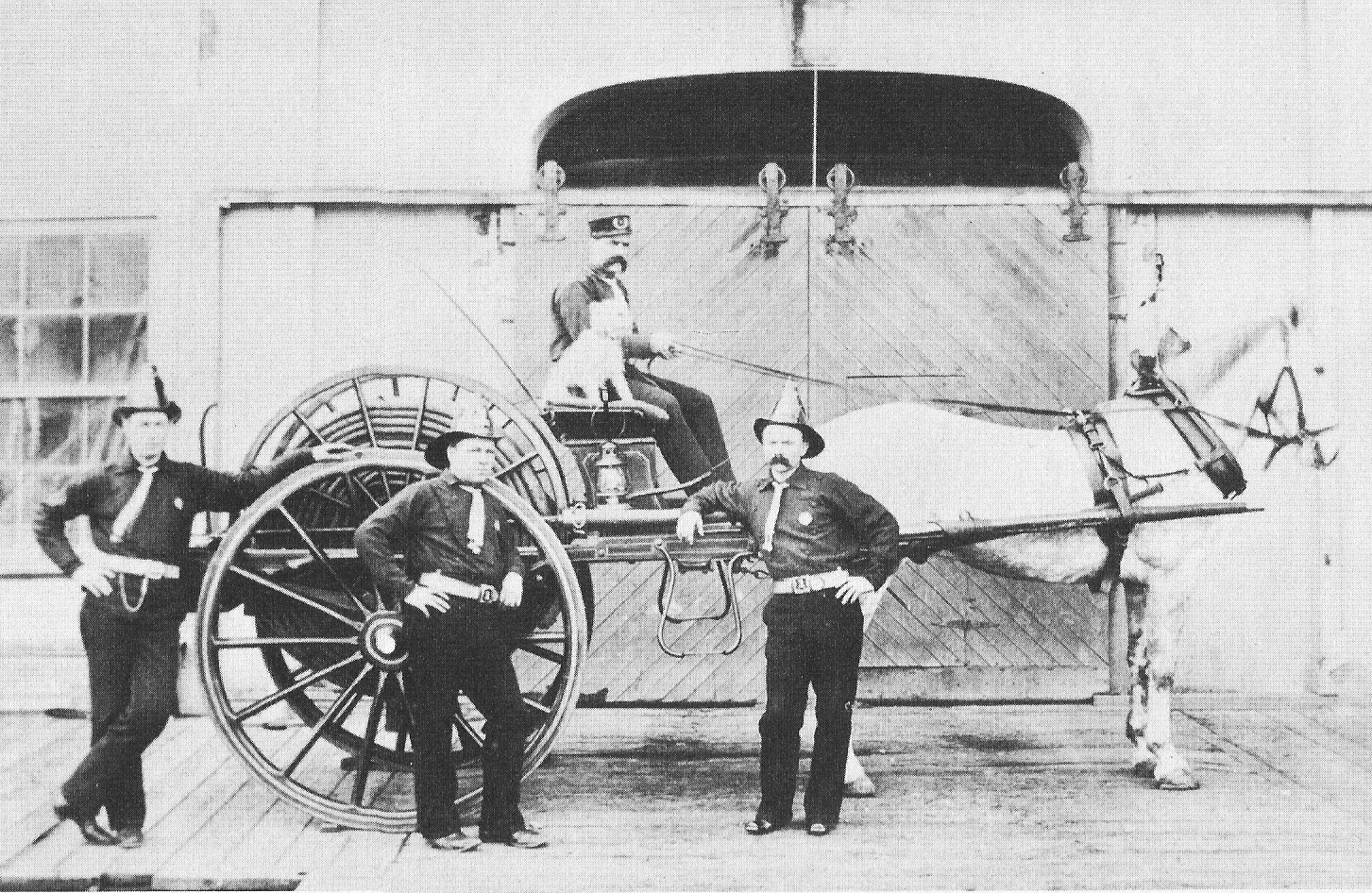
- Pioneer Firehouse in 1854

- Location within California Location within the United States
- 38.5829°N 121.5024°W
- Location: 925 3rd Street; 3rd and J Streets; Sacramento, California

History
- Built: 1854

California Historical Landmark
- Designated: May 22, 1957
- Reference no.: 612

Pioneer Firehouse was the first Firehouse in Sacramento, California built in 1854. The site of the Firehouse is a California Historical Landmark No. 612 listed on May 22, 1957. Pioneer Firehouse was run by the Sacramento Fire Department, Engine Company #1. The Pioneer Firehouse was a two-story building on the corner of 3rd Street and J Street and is the oldest fire company of California. The Sacramento Fire Department founded on February 5, 1850.

== History ==
The Sacramento Fire's Confidence Engine Company Number 1 started March 6, 1851 with 65 firemen, with the nickname "The Roosters". The city was a first volunteer fire department till 1872. The fire company was moved into new Sacramento Paid Fire Department in 1872. In early Sacramento fire was a constant danger and the city has many fires. Many of the city's home and building were made of wood and even canvas. Open flame of candles and oil lamps were used for lighting. Cooking and heating were done with open flame wood. Horse-drawn fire hand water pump, were later replaced with steampower pumps. Sacramento Fire Department started using motorized fire trucks in 1912. The Pioneer Mutual Volunteer Firehouse was restore in 1959 and used as restaurant as an effort to preserve the original building. The site is now a new restaurant building near Old Sacramento State Historic Park and Interstate 5 freeway.

== See also ==
- California Historical Landmarks in Sacramento County
