= Government of Sacramento, California =

Government of the City of Sacramento
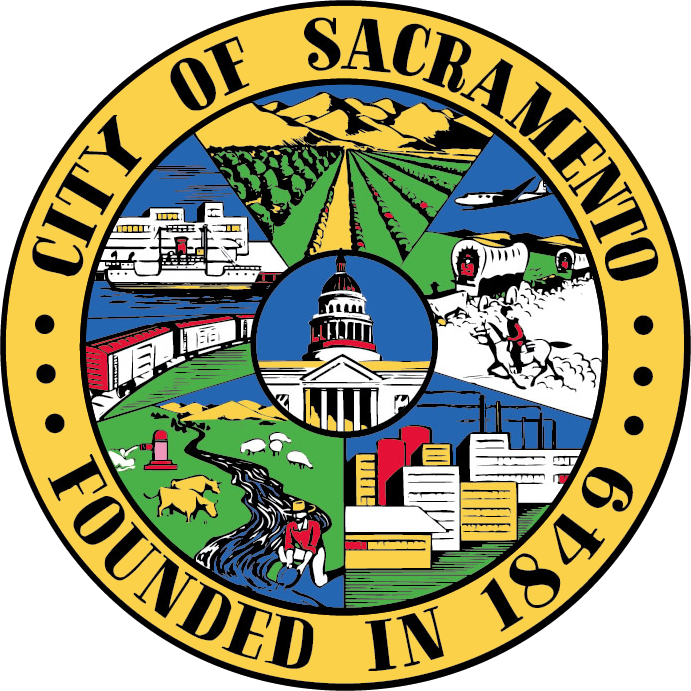
- Seal of Sacramento
- Formation: February 27, 1850; 175 years ago
- City charter: Sacramento City Charter
- Website: cityofsacramento.gov

Legislative branch
- Legislature: Sacramento City Council
- Meeting place: Sacramento City Hall

Executive branch
- Mayor: Kevin McCarty
- Appointed by: Election

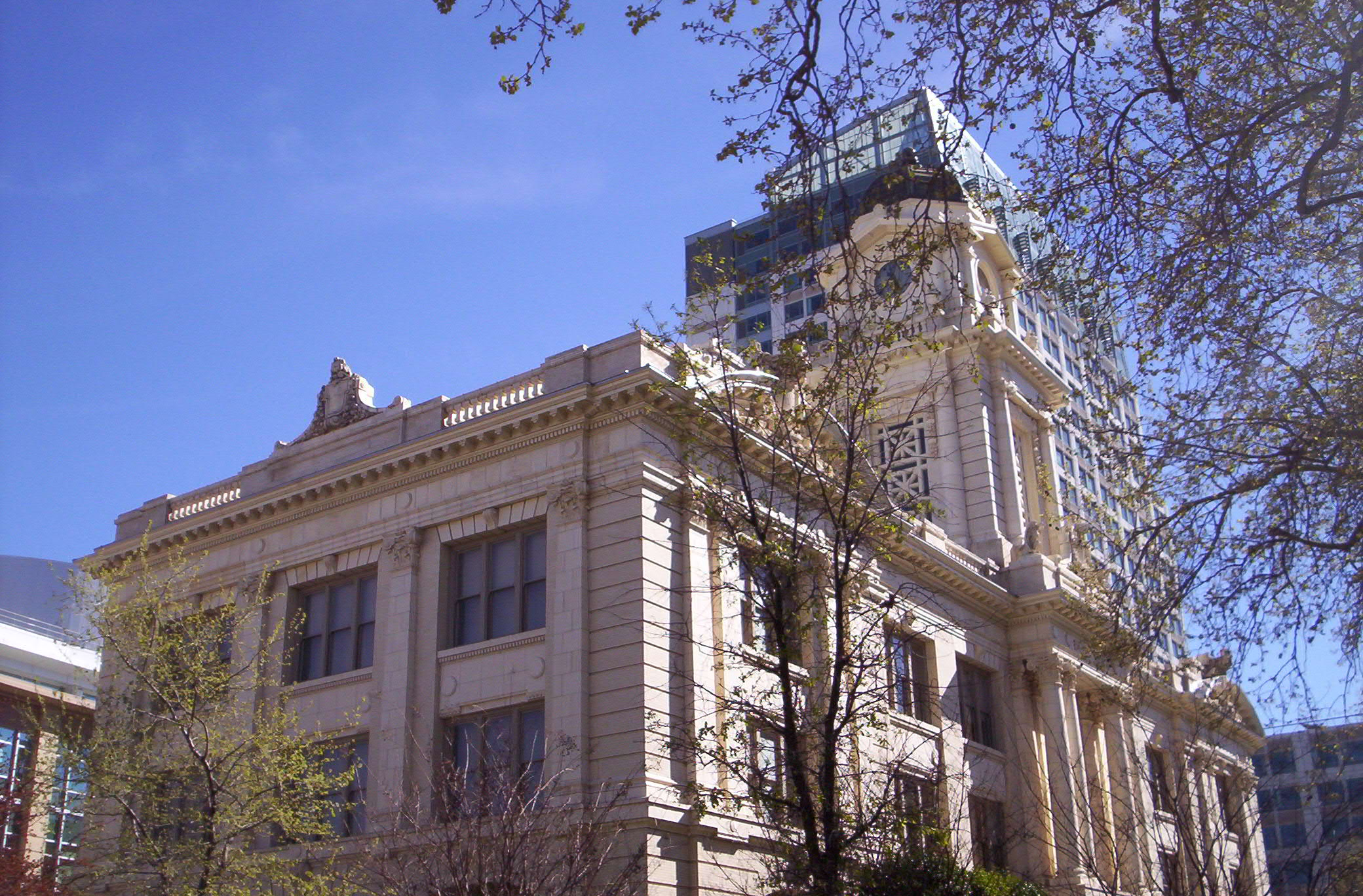
Sacramento City Hall

The Government of Sacramento operates as a charter city (as opposed to a general law city) under the Charter of the City of Sacramento. The elected government is composed of the Sacramento City Council with 8 city council districts and the Mayor of Sacramento, which operate under a manager-council government. In addition, there are numerous departments and appointed officers such as the City Manager, Sacramento Police Department (SPD), the Sacramento Fire Department (SFD), Community Development Department, City Clerk, City Attorney, and City Treasurer. Since 2024, the mayor has been Kevin McCarty and the current councilors were Lisa Kaplan, Roger Dickinson, Karina Talamantes, Phil Pluckebaum, Caity Maple, Eric Guerra, Rick Jennings II, and Mai Vang.

== Organization ==
=== Mayor ===
The Mayor of Sacramento is the presiding officer of the city, and is elected for a four-year term. Under the California Constitution, all judicial, school, county, and city offices, including those of chartered cities, are nonpartisan. The 57th and current mayor is Kevin McCarty.

=== City Council ===
The Sacramento City Council is the governing body of the City of Sacramento. The council is composed of eight members elected from single-member districts for four-year terms. The council members as of December 10, 2024 were:

- Lisa Kaplan, District 1
- Roger Dickinson, District 2
- Karina Talamantes, District 3 (Mayor Pro Tem)
- Phil Pluckebaum, District 4
- Caity Maple, District 5 (Vice Mayor)
- Eric Guerra, District 6
- Rick Jennings II, District 7
- Mai Vang, District 8

=== Departments ===
The Sacramento Police Department (SPD) polices the city of Sacramento.

The Sacramento Fire Department (SFD) provides fire protection and emergency medical services for Sacramento.

The Community Development Department is responsible for property development application review, building permits and inspections, code compliance, and long-range planning.

== Law ==
The Charter of the City of Sacramento is the founding document of the Sacramento government. Pursuant to the charter, all legislative power is vested in the Council and is exercised by ordinance. Pursuant to this power, the Council has caused to be promulgated the Sacramento City Code, consisting of codified regulatory and penal ordinances. Every act prohibited or declared unlawful, and every failure to perform an act required, by the ordinances are misdemeanor crimes, unless otherwise specified as infractions.

== Other governments ==
=== California ===
The Sacramento County Superior Court, which covers the entire county, is not a County department but a division of the State's trial court system. Historically, the courthouses were county-owned buildings that were maintained at county expense, which created significant friction since the trial court judges, as officials of the state government, had to lobby the county Board of Supervisors for facility renovations and upgrades. In turn, the state judiciary successfully persuaded the state Legislature to authorize the transfer of all courthouses to the state government in 2008 and 2009 (so that judges would have direct control over their own courthouses). Courthouse security is still provided by the county government under a contract with the state.

=== Sacramento County ===
Sacramento is also part of Sacramento County, for which the Government of Sacramento County is defined and authorized under the California Constitution, California law, and the Charter of the County of Sacramento. Much of the Government of California is in practice the responsibility of county governments such as the Government of Sacramento County. The County government provides countywide services such as elections and voter registration, law enforcement, jails, vital records, property records, tax collection, public health, and social services. The County government is primarily composed of the elected five-member Board of Supervisors, several other elected offices including the Sheriff, District Attorney, and Assessor, and numerous county departments and entities under the supervision of the County Executive Officer.

== See also ==
- Government of Sacramento County, California
- Government of California
- Government of the United States
