= Local Agency Formation Commission =

Service planning agency in California

Local Agency Formation Commissions or LAFCOs are regional service planning agencies of the State of California. LAFCOs are located in all 58 counties and exercise regulatory and planning powers in step with their prescribed directive to oversee the establishment, expansion, governance, and dissolution of local government agencies and their municipal service areas to meet current and future community needs. LAFCOs were established in 1963 and administer a section of California planning law now known as the Cortese-Knox-Hertzberg Local Government Reorganization Act of 2000.

LAFCOs' regulatory powers are outlined in California Government Code Sections 56375 and 56133. This include approving, establishing, expanding, reorganizing, and, in limited circumstances, dissolving cities and special districts. LAFCOs are also responsible for approving all outside service extensions by contract or agreement beginning in 2001. LAFCOs' regulatory powers are generally exercised in response to applications filed by other local agencies, landowners, or registered voters. LAFCOs' are also allowed to initiate certain proposals if consistent with a recommendation from its own planning studies, such as establishing, consolidating, or dissolving special districts.

LAFCOs' planning responsibilities are explicit to informing their regulatory powers and highlighted by establishing spheres of influence for all cities and special districts. Spheres of influence represent the State of California's version of municipal growth boundaries and demark the territory that the LAFCO independently believes represents the appropriate and probable future jurisdictional boundary and service area of the subject agency. All jurisdictional boundary changes and outside service extensions, notably, must be consistent with the subject agencies' spheres of influence, with limited exceptions.

State law requires all 58 LAFCOs appoint their own executive officer who serves as the agency administrator and responsible for making recommendations on all jurisdictional changes within the county. Larger LAFCOs - typically in the San Francisco Bay Area and Southern California - are staffed with three to ten employees plus outside consultants. The largest LAFCO in California in terms of both staff and budget is San Diego with 10 staff members and an operating budget of over $2.0 million.

== History ==
They were established in 1963 in all California counties except San Francisco, which would obtain one only in 2001, by the California State Legislature. Their current legal authority and mandate are defined by the Cortese-Knox-Hertzberg Local Government Reorganization Act of 2000 (Government Code Section 56000 et seq). LAFCOs' powers and duties have expanded in step with subsequent legislation and most recently include regulating cities and districts' ability to provide services outside their jurisdictional boundaries by contract or agreement. LAFCOs also must approve requests by districts to either expand their service powers and/or divest existing service powers.

== Authority ==
LAFCOs have both regulatory and planning authority:

- As a regulatory agency, they are for "discouraging urban sprawl and encouraging the orderly formation and development of local agencies" based on "local circumstances and conditions." Key regulatory responsibilities include establishing (formations and incorporations), expanding (annexations), decreasing (detachments), combining (mergers and consolidations), and eliminating (dissolutions and disincorporations) cities and special districts as well as authorizing outside service contracts.
- As a planning agency, it is charged to determine and update, at least every five years, the sphere of influence of each city and special district. In updating spheres of influence, it must prepare Municipal Service Reviews of relevant local agencies and services. It may initiate proposals to consolidate special districts, merge a special district with a city, dissolve a special district, establish a subsidiary district, or any combination of them.

Under the agency, no community within an incorporated city has ever been granted city status. That is partially because the Cortese-Knox-Hertzberg Local Government Reorganization Act of 2000 makes it difficult for communities to break away from their original cities, as the community must gain approval from the city from which it is detaching, and it requires two thirds of the entire community and re-affected city to agree. The only community within a city ever to be brought before a vote by LAFCO was the San Fernando Valley in the early 2000s, which was denied. No detachments from a city have been successful in the state since 1947.

LAFCOs are governed by a commission consisting of appointed elected officials representing the county board of supervisors, city councils, and - at least for most - special district directors. (Not all LAFCOs have special district representation). The appointed elected officials on LAFCO also appoint members from the general public to serve on the commission. LAFCO funding is provided by local agencies and divided in one-third apportionments between the county, cities, and special districts with the latter amounts further divided among the individual agencies based on tax revenues.

=== Types ===
According to the Committee on Local Government of the California Senate, LAFCOs regulate all city and most special district boundaries, including these:

- Airport districts
- California water districts
- Community services districts
- County sanitation districts
- County service areas
- County water districts
- County waterworks districts
- Fire protection districts
- Harbor and port districts
- Healthcare districts
- Irrigation districts
- Library districts
- Mosquito abatement districts
- Municipal utility districts
- Municipal water districts
- Pest control districts
- Police protection districts
- Public cemetery districts
- Public utility districts
- Reclamation districts
- Recreation and park districts
- Resource conservation districts
- Sanitary districts
- Sewer districts
- Sewer maintenance districts
- Vector control districts

LAFCOs do not directly regulate counties. There are also certain types of special districts that are exempt from LAFCO oversight. Among them are the following:

- Air pollution control districts
- Air quality management districts
- Bridge or highway districts
- Community college districts
- Community facilities districts (Mello-Roos districts)
- Improvement districts
- Joint power agencies
- Joint highway districts
- Permanent road divisions
- Redevelopment agencies
- School districts
- Separation of grade districts
- Service zones of special districts
- Special assessment districts
- Transit or rapid transit districts
- Unified or union high school library districts
