= Sacramento Fire Department =

Coordinates: 38°33′20″N 121°28′08″W

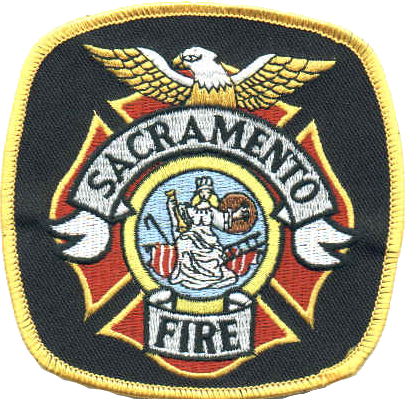

Operational area
- Country: United States
- State: California
- City: Sacramento

Agency overview
- Established: 1850
- Annual calls: 109,342 (2022)
- Employees: 730.5 FTE (2022–2023)
- Annual budget: $173,100,000 (2022–2023)
- Staffing: Career
- Fire chief: Chris Costamagna
- EMS level: ALS
- IAFF: 522

Facilities and equipment
- Battalions: 4
- Stations: 24
- Engines: 24
- Trucks: 9
- Rescues: 1
- Ambulances: 18
- Tenders: 1
- HAZMAT: 2
- Wildland: 3 - Type 3; 4 - Type 6
- Fireboats: 4

Website
- Official website
- IAFF website

The Sacramento Fire Department (SFD) provides fire protection and emergency medical services to the city of Sacramento, California. The department was first organized on February 5, 1850, the second oldest in the state. It was not until March 30, 1872, when it finally became a paid fire department. Additionally, the city also provides contracted services for the Pacific Fruitridge Fire Protection District and the Natomas Fire Protection District to provide emergency services. This contracted area expands the department's response area to 146 square miles (380 km^{2}) as they provide services to approximately 540,000 residents. In 2025, Sacramento Fire partnered with Medic Ambulance to increase medical transportation flexibility with the agreement to staff 4 Basic Life Support ambulances.

== Stations & Apparatus ==
The city itself has 20 fire stations spread across the city. It also operates out of 4 additional stations which are contracted out to the City of Sacramento. In Addition, there is also a Reserve Station. Each station has a fire engine along with a number of support units. All specialty rigs, such as the wildland fire engines and the hazardous material truck are cross-staffed by engine and truck personnel. There are also four boats spread across the stations for rescues in the two rivers that both run through, and border Sacramento, the American River and the Sacramento River, respectively.

Fire Station Number	Address	Engine Company or Squad Company	EMS Medic Unit	Truck Company	Wildland Unit	Other units	Battalion
1	624 Q St	Engine 1	Medic 1				1
2	1229 I St	Engine 2	Medic 2	Truck 2		Boat 2, water bike 1 & 2, Battalion 1	1
3 (contracted)	7208 W. Elkhorn Bl	Engine 3			Engine 603	water tender 3	3
4	3145 Granada Wy	Engine 4	Medic 4				1
5	731 Broadway	Engine 5		Truck 5		Boat 5	1
6	3301 Martin Luther King Jr. Bl	Engine 6	Medic 6	Truck 6			2
7	6500 Wyndham Dr	Engine 7	Medic 7	Truck 7		HazMat 7	4
8	5990 H St	Engine 8	Medic 8			Boat 8	1
9 (CLOSED)	5801 Florin Perkins Rd						
10	5642 66th St	Engine 10	Medic 10	Truck 10			2
11	785 Florin Rd	Medic 11			Boat 11, Battalion 4	4	
12	4500 24th St	Engine 12	Medic 12			EMS 22	2
13	1100 43rd Av	Engine 13	Medic 13			AIR 13	4
14	1341 North C St	Engine 14			Engine 614	EMS 23	1
15	1640 W El Camino Ave	Engine 15	Medic 615		Engine 615		1
16	7363 24th St	Engine 16		Truck 16	Engine 316		4
17	1311 Bell Av	Engine 17	Medic 17	Truck 17			3
18 (contracted)	746 North Market Bl	Engine 18	M618		Engine 318		3
19	1700 Challenge Wy	Engine 19	Medic 19		Engine 619	Type 1 OES	3
20	2512 Rio Linda Bl	Engine 20	Medic 20			Rescue 20, Rescue 220, Battalion 3	3
30	1901 Club Center Dr	Engine 30	Medic 30	Truck 30		HazMat 30	3
43	4201 El Centro Rd	Engine 43	Medic 43	Truck 43	Engine 343, Water Tender 43		3
56 (contracted)	3720 47th Av	Engine 56		Engine 656	Battalion 2 Type 3 OES Engine 8434	2	
57 (contracted)	7927 East Parkway	Engine 57	Medic 657				4
60	3301 Julliard Dr	Engine 60			Engine 660		2
99 (Reserve)	300 Arden Way	Squad 299				Rehab 99, Air 99	3

== USAR Task Force 7 ==
Some of the teams most notable deployments include the Northridge earthquake (1994), Oklahoma City bombing (1995), World Trade Center (2001) Hurricane Katrina (2005) Hurricane Harvey (2017) and Hurricane Maria (2017)

== See also ==
- Pioneer Mutual Volunteer Firehouse
