= Pesticide Drift Exposure Response Act =

The Pesticide Drift Exposure Response Act, or SB 391 (Florez-Escutia), is a California act that was passed in 2005. This act was put into place in order to help victims of California's pesticide drift problem.

Farming in Northern California

== California Pesticide Use ==
California has a large agricultural business that produces more than 400 different items for consumers. The agriculture industry in California also produces a large amount of produce for the United States, including a third of the US's vegetables and two-thirds of the US's fruits/nuts. Due to this large amount of produce production there is also a large amount of pesticide use.

According to a data report from California's Department of Pesticide Regulation, in 2017 there were a total of 205 million pounds of applied active ingredients, chemicals in pesticides that control pests, and there were 104 million acres treated in total.

== California’s History of Pesticide Drift ==
=== Earlimart, California (November, 1999) ===
One significant event that led to the rise of pesticide drift awareness and the inclusion of this senate bill was a pesticide drift incident that occurred in Earlimart, California, in November, 1999. During this incident the mist from the pesticide known as sectagon 42 flew into the San Joaquin Valley town of Earlimart. This incident forced 150 people to evacuate the town and 29 people were sent to the hospital. Those who were taken to the hospital suffered from nausea, headaches, vomiting, etc. During this incident the United Farm Workers also commented on the danger of the pesticide that were exposed to workers. As it caused both cancer and birth defects in laboratory animals under the 1986 proposition 65. They also stated that this pesticide led to severe cases of asthma in an area that had a spill of this pesticide. Therefore, there was concern over both the short and long-term impacts of this pesticide drift on the people of Earlimart. During this incident, residents of Earlimart that were affected by the pesticide were taken to a nearby school, stripped, and hosed down.

=== Resulting Organization ===
The Earlimart incident resulted in organization for better regulation and awareness regarding pesticides.

“The Earlimart incident really helped to put pesticide drift on the map, partially because there was media coverage of the way that people were treated after the incident, and real concerns about how effective the emergency response system was at that time.”

— Jill Harrison (assistant professor of sociology at the University of Colorado and author of “Pesticide Drift and the Pursuit of Environmental Justice.”)

Teresa De Anda was a resident of Earlimart who started to help in the organization of the Tulare County community after the Earlimart incident. De Anda started to attend meetings with groups like the United Farm Workers, and gathered first hand information from residents of a similar pesticide accident in Arvin in 2002. De Anda other groups continued to advocate for establishing plans in the case of pesticide drift occurring, as there was a lack of proper protocols. This work from De Anda, her Earlimart group, and other groups resulted in the creation of Senate Bill 391 by State Senator Dean Florez.

== SB 391 Information ==
Senate Bill 391 added Sections 12996.5, 12997.5, and 12997.7 to the Food and Agricultural Code, and focused on pesticides. Before focusing on new laws this bill highlights existing laws that are already put into place that relates to pesticide regulation. This includes how the Department of Pesticide Regulation is responsible for the enforcement of pesticides laws and regulations, and that there is a Department of Pesticide Regulation Fund. There was also existing law that required the reporting of pesticide poisoning, and that the Office of Environmental Health Hazard Assessment would make a program that alerts physicians about symptoms, diagnosis, and treatment required for those affected.

New laws in this bill stated that those who violated pesticide provisions would be held responsible for costs to those injured or those who have resulting illness. The bill states that the California Environmental Protection Agency needs to establish minimum standard protocols for amending, which also meant that the certified uniform program agency would follow these standards for amending area plans. Since these local agencies would comply with these requirements there would also be state mandated local program. The state would be required to reimburse local agencies and school districts for costs mandated by the state, which would be reimbursed with the newly created State Mandates Claims Fund.
