= Pesticide incidents in the San Joaquin Valley =

Pesticide incidents in the San Joaquin Valley is a topic covering the justice and health issues of people living in the San Joaquin Valley resulting from the use of pesticides in the region. Pesticide use in the San Joaquin Valley began in the 1880s when certain insects were known to be causing harm in the region, much of whose economy is still based on the successful agriculture and farming of many different kinds of crops. Pesticide illnesses were reported sporadically during that time frame but were not focused as a major issue until the post-World War II agricultural boom in the late 1940s when pesticide poisonings became more widely publicized. Though Rachel Carson's Silent Spring and the use of chemicals in weapons during the Vietnam War led the federal government to pass restrictions on pesticide use, residents, primarily of low income, have struggled with the health impacts of pesticide use due to persistent over-spraying by agriculture companies working for profit.

== Background ==
Since California became a state in 1850, the production of agriculture has been a key part of the economy and appeal, especially in the Central Valley. Farms were established in the area because of its temperate climate with warmer elements for its latitude and advertisements showing the supposed quality of produce grown in this climate. However, insects harming growing crops became a problem as early as the 1880s. Pesticides were introduced in the San Joaquin Valley around this time and by 1900 were regulated by a state agency, the Department of Agriculture. This department published incidents of pesticide poisonings and accidents as a record of occupational health in the workplace fields. At the time, health was viewed through the germ theory of disease, rather than focusing on the environment, and pesticide poisonings were not seen as a major issue.

In the late 1940s, however, a population boom after World War II demanded more agriculture, and California was growing more crops such as grapes which required more pesticides. By 1963, more than 16,000 different kinds of pesticide had been registered in the state. Reports of pesticide poisonings like a 1949 incident in the city of Marysville became more common. Silent Spring by Rachel Carson, published in 1962, prompted the public to question the safety of pesticides, but major incidents of poisonings like 1963 and 1967 northern San Joaquin Valley peach farmers had continued. Awareness about the dangers of pesticides led to the formation of the United Farm Workers in 1964. Federal hearings on pesticide safety began in 1969 and safety laws began to be passed in the 1970s as well as the Delaney Amendment which prohibited carcinogens in food supply. This coincided with the shift of health concerns to focus on the local environment. The effects of pesticides continue to be a problem for many people living in California's San Joaquin Valley.

== Effects and response ==
Pesticides in the San Joaquin Valley contain many different chemicals that can be harmful to human health. "The health risk to people depends on the toxicity of the pesticide and the amount of exposure." These chemicals include DDT and organophosphates such as TEPP syntox, EPN, parthion, metam sodium, and methomyl. Chemicals that are known to cause acute pesticide poisoning are organophosphates, carbamates, pyrethrins and pyrethroids, arsenicals, fumigants, anti-coagulants, and bipyridilium. They can enter the human body through direct contact by way of the skin including through the contact of plants with pesticide residue, over spraying of farm fields, inhaling pesticide residue in the air during pesticide drifts, and eating foods contaminated with pesticide residue. Being exposed through ingestion is usually due to carelessness. Accidental ingestion occurs mostly because pesticides are taken from the original container and put into a new, unlabeled bottle, such as a food container. In this case, children get ahold of them. One-half of the accidental pesticide ingestion fatalities were caused due to this and they all involved children under the age of ten years old. If these pesticides were stored properly, children wouldn't be able to gain access, thus, potentially saving them from the harm. There are both chronic and acute effects from pesticide exposure that have been known to occur in the San Joaquin Valley. Observed chronic causes include birth defects, miscarriages, sterility, neurological effects, and child developmental impairments. Observed acute causes have been rashes in the eyes and on the skin. One study also showed pesticides containing ziriam were correlated with an increased risk of Parkinson's disease. Fish that are part of the food supply for many people were also found to be killed, with certain mixes of OPs being more toxic than others when pesticide contaminated waters of the San Joaquin Delta were tested in a lab with titans. People most at risk involve workers who manufacture the chemicals, and applicators exposed to high levels of pesticides over many years. They run the greatest risk of developing any chronic effects. "Applicators who do not follow label directions and fail to wear protective equipment increase their risk of developing chronic effects." Children are at the highest risk of accidentally ingesting these chemicals.

In specific incidents, dizziness and nausea were found in a 1988 case in the southern valley town of Delano, where two of the 54 farmworkers who fell ill were unconscious after a field was sprayed with methomyl. Pesticides were also a suspected cause in a cancer cluster affecting 13 children in the town of McFarland due to inhalation of chemicals between 1975 and 1988. Pesticide regulation has been difficult due to the power of companies that profit from pesticide use and fears of their prosecution or losing their support.

When pesticide regulations were enacted in the 1970s, the United States federal government set tolerance levels on pesticide known to cause cancer sprayed on foods, but the EPA still authorized chemical testing that was not complete. After the McFarland cancer reports appeared, Governor George Deukmjian vetoed a bill requiring warning signs for pesticides in yards and farms, in effect supporting pesticide sprayers.

In 1999, the town of Earlimart in Tulare County was hit with pesticide drift from metam sodium drifting into fields. The sprayers were fined $150,000, but use of the dangerous chemical did not stop. There has also historically been racial prejudice in assessing pesticide concerns in the San Joaquin Valley. Many of the farmworkers who came to work in California fields were immigrants or braceros coming from Mexico and Latin America. Pesticide exposure was originally studied to be complex in which certain actions like wearing heavy protective gear would defend people against pesticide poisoning. Many of these workers were directly sprayed and had little knowledge of the kinds of pesticides they were being exposed to. In addition, doctors would see cases related to workers' pesticide concerns and diagnose it as heat stroke instead. This led people to believe that immigrant workers' own habits contributed to their frequent illnesses, and not necessarily pesticide exposure.

Pesticide exposure in the San Joaquin Valley has continued to disproportionately affect low income farm families of color who make less than $10,000 per year (1991) in income. Response to the issue has largely gotten attention by way of lawsuits, such as one against a San Joaquin County helicopter company called Alpine Helicopter Service. Beginning in 2013, the company repeatedly sprayed pesticides, including near a children's sports facility, and failed to comply with the state's health and safety codes. Nonprofit organizations such as the Central Valley Air Coalition have consulted with state and local agencies such as the Fresno County Farm Bureau on protection for residents against pesticide use, such as establishing buffer zones and finding alternatives to pesticides to protect crops.

== Pesticide controversies ==
=== McFarland cancer cluster ===
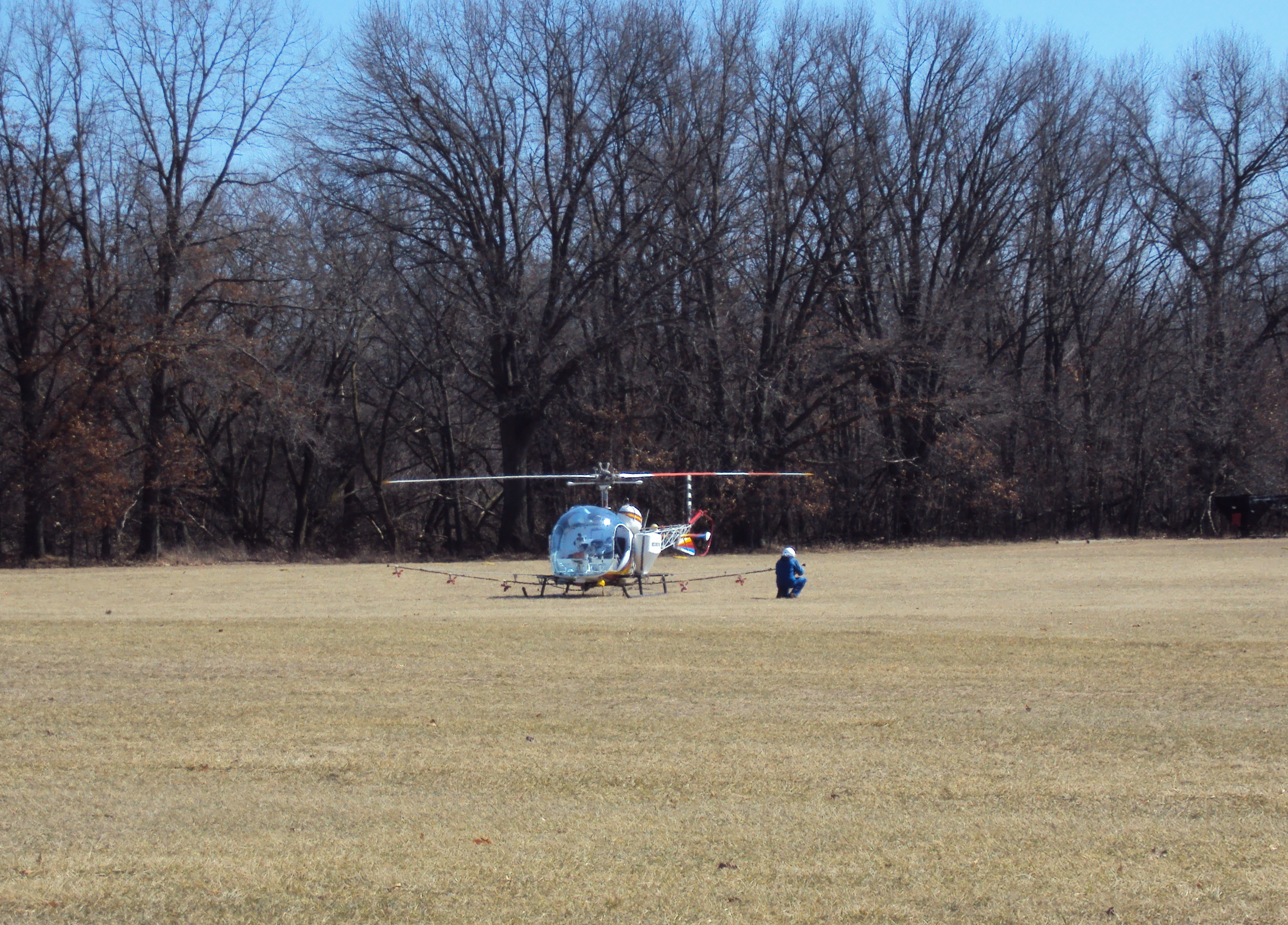
A pesticide helicopter, similar to the ones used by the Alpine Helicopter Service Inc. which were involved in the pesticide drift incidents

From 1975 to 1996, the city of McFarland in Kern County reported 21 of its children as being diagnosed with cancer, which is three times higher than average, given that McFarland had a population of around 8,000 at the beginning of the cancer cluster. As reports of cancer cases began to increase, local residents pointed fingers at the pesticides which were commonly used on farms in the area. News outlets such as the Los Angeles Times began to take notice and started reporting on the situation. Because of the severity of the cancer cluster and the amount of attention the it was receiving, the U.S. Department of Health and Human Services (USDHHS) launched an investigation into the incident. The USDHHS performed a multitude of tests on households, the surrounding areas, the air, and waterways, but found nothing conclusive that could point to pesticides as being the cause of the high cancer incidence. Pesticide companies were quick to defend themselves after the report came out because as the report stated there was no indication that pesticides were at fault. This event remains controversial and many are still divided on whether or not pesticides played a bigger role that may have gone unnoticed despite the investigation by the USDHHS.

=== Alpine Helicopter Service Incidents 2013-2020 ===
Alpine Helicopter Service is a Lodi CA based company that sprays pesticides over large farm areas. From 2013 to 2020 Alpine had been directly involved in causing a multitude of pesticide drift incidents. Pesticide drift involves the migration of pesticide particles into non-regulated areas through the air. Aerial application is the application method that most regularly causes pesticide drift, being the cause of 39% of drift incidents. Aerial application in the Central Valley involves crops such as cotton and alfalfa, and these crops were sprayed with chlorpyrifos. These drift incidents ended up endangering the health of people in the residential areas close to the location where the pesticides were dispersed and created crop loss and damage for nearby farms. In 2014, Alpine Helicopter Services participated in a spraying on two Delta Islands that caused severe crop loss while also spraying bystanders with the herbicides. In one instance, pesticides drifted into a special education school called Turner Academy after a nearby walnut orchard was sprayed by the Alpine Helicopter Service company (April 2017). Several parts of the school were covered in the pesticide particles, ranging from the school's playground to the sidewalks. In another instance, pesticides sprayed over a pumpkin field drifted over to the Stockton Sports Complex while children were playing soccer (September 7, 2019). On this day, winds blew at speeds of 17 miles per hour, and these high-speed winds blew pesticide particles over the sports complex, which ultimately put the health of the children and their families at risk. In one incident, a woman was sprayed by pesticides as the Alpine helicopters distributed the chemicals overhead, which then drifted onto her backyard (July 2020).

Eventually, many news outlets such as Capitol Weekly and The Record began reporting and identifying at least 11 separate pesticide drift incidents that Alpine was involved in. As a result, in 2020 the California Department of Pesticide Regulation (DPR) and California's attorney general Xavier Becerra filed a lawsuit against the company. The judgment was received on February 22, 2022 and filed on March 4, 2022 by the San Joaquin County District Attorney's Office. The statement of decision declares that there is evidence that Alpine Services did not abide to regulation of spraying pesticides by breaking several standards such as failing to check weather conditions and setting buffer zones before pesticide application. Under the court judgment released on December 9, 2022, which followed the San Joaquin County Superior Court's decision in March of 2022 that ruled that the Alpine Helicopter Services were legally responsible for the pesticide drift incidents, Alpine Helicopter Services was required to pay several fines for damages done to residents and residential areas near pesticide spray locations. These fines consisted of $200,000, including $155,000 that were paid to the California Department of Pesticide Regulation, as well as additional fines to several branches of San Joaquin's local government that are involved in regulation of air pollution. In addition, the company faces harsher regulation on their pesticide use to prevent further harm towards residents in the area. This regulation consists of mandatory spotters that conduct careful examination of pesticide-spraying areas on the group, notices to residents in areas where pesticides will be sprayed at least 48 hours in advance, and monthly reports to the California Department of Pesticide Regulation that include sensitive sites (sites where pesticides were sprayed) from the prior month.

== Responses to pesticide usage ==
=== Medical journal research ===
During the early 1960's and late 1970's, doctors and medical professionals from across the country conducted research in the Central Valley to better understand the effects of pesticides on the human body as well attempt to combat further incidents. A majority of this research was conducted on field workers who sought out medical attention for poisonings, since they had the most exposure to such pesticides than any other group of people.

Many doctors conducted their research on organophosphate pesticides, one of many forms of pesticide that specifically targets the Acetylcholinesterase enzyme. The intention of this research was to differentiate pesticide poisonings from other common diagnoses at the time, as well as further understand how what specific chemicals were harming the human body. Some of the most common insecticides that were causing poisonings were found to be Parathion, Phosdrin, Thimet, and Systox. A large factor in this reason this research was conducted was due to the fact that it was difficult for doctors to diagnose a pesticide poisoning during this time. The symptoms of pesticide poisoning were to difficult to distinguish from other much more common diagnoses at the time. Due to the work and dedication of these doctors, pesticide incidents have been well documented and are distinguishable when diagnosed.

== Scientific findings and public responses to pesticide usage ==
Civilians and government officials became more aware of the pesticide usage in the last century. Many studies were conducted in recent years to measure the levels and effects of pesticides in the Central Valley. Findings stirred up community members in the Central Valley. Scientific data became useful for groups such as the UFW to push for stricter pesticide usage laws. Events such as the McFarland Cancer Cluster had a huge impact in that many people became more conscious of pesticides and their carcinogenic effects. More recently, the state of California implemented policies to restrict certain types of pesticide that have been proven by researchers to have many detrimental effects. Environmental groups continue to work to pass stricter laws regarding pesticide usage.

=== Scientific findings ===
Research published in Environmental Toxicology and Chemistry has shown that pesticides enter the atmosphere through various methods. There were pesticide residues from the Central Valley found as far away as the Arctic. Pesticide residues spread through water surfaces, wet deposition, and through the air mass. Although individual pesticide levels are below acute toxicity levels in the Central Valley, there are synergestic and additive effects of many pesticides that harm many sensitive species.

A more detailed study has been done in 2004 regarding the toxicity of pyrethroid in specific environments. Data collection showed that cumulative effects of various pyrethroids were responsible for 17 out of 23 samples used to measure toxicity. The most extreme cases were found in Tailwater ponds. There were 77 sedimentary samples used for data collection, and 42% of the samples had toxic levels of pesticides that caused the mortality of species of several Amphipods. Furthermore, data suggested that pyrethroid concentrations in the Central Valley were greater after their usage in agriculture compared to concentrations after heavy rains. This suggests that pesticide levels during irrigation season in places with greatest pesticide usage - Fresno, Madera, Stainslaus, Sutter - would be particularly detrimental to residents and various species in the environment.

=== Political response ===
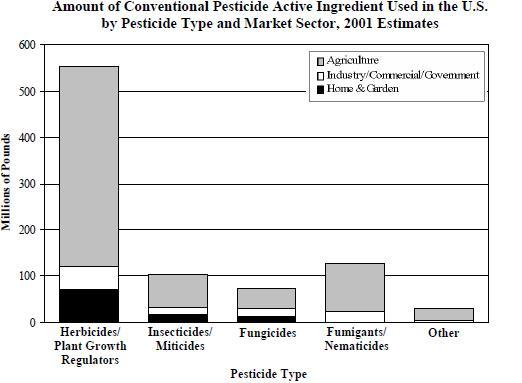
Studies show that pesticide usage is not only limited to agricultural settings.

Recently, the California Department of Pesticide Regulation proposed rules to restrict neonicotinoid chemicals, insecticides that harm bees that pollinate crops. Also, in 2024, all neonicotinoid in non-agricultural settings would be banned. This chemical is used throughout all the states for agriculture, but it is especially concentrated in the Central Valley. Fresno, Kern, Tulare, Monterey and San Joaquin are among the top counties of neonicotinoid usage. Now, the next step for environmentalists is to advocate for politicians to address crop seeds that are coated with neonicotinoids. Environmentalists have proved that these coated seeds still contribute significantly to the neonicotinoid mass, and that it is detrimental to honeybees.

The United Farm Workers have fought to improve farmworkers' working conditions, and have added pressure to politicians through their union marches. President Biden supported this by releasing Assembly Bill 2183, affirming that farmworkers have the fundamental right to gather and advocate for themselves regarding their workplace. Gavin Newsom followed up and enacted the law in California. Both Gavin Newsom and President Biden agreed that farmworkers should have an easy way to form a union. With support from politicians, the Union worked to push through bills that regulate whether or not the farmworkers can work in the heat.

=== Public response ===
Following the McFarland Cancer Cluster in 1975, the small city in California never fully recovered from the effects of the pesticides. This is a city inhabited mostly by farmworkers, and 94% of the population is Latino. City leaders believed that the poor economy of the city was to blame for the Cancer Cluster. The majority of the residents wanted federal officials to leave the town. Even a decade or so after the incident, there were about 1 in 100 cases of cancer concentrated in this small community. Investigators started collecting data but nothing conclusive was found. This inability to find a clear conclusion enraged the civilians. For instance, some people in the McFarland community complained that the investigations were incomplete. One resident reported that there were no investigations of the deep soil or the air. A few others did not believe that the clusters even existed.

A more recent experience came from the Madera community. One problem was that the orchards were planted just outside of residential neighborhoods, and the chemical spray often missed the leaves and ended up on people's homes. One resident in the community reported that the noises of the machines and the dirt from the pesticide spray created a huge disturbance in the daily life in the neighborhood. In the town of La Vina, over 300 residents tried to leverage a new state policy to decrease the pesticide drift from the fields into the community. They reported to the state officials that the orchards were too close to the residential area, and that the pesticides resulted increased the chance of premature death. These residents have partnered up with local land and water agencies to allocate state funds to shut down farmlands. The La Vina residents also pointed out the effects of the carcinogenic compounds near their elementary schools. They have requested the United States Environmental Protection Agency to give them a $500,000 grant to perform chemical tests for safety measures.
