= Nicole Kleinstreuer =

American bioengineer

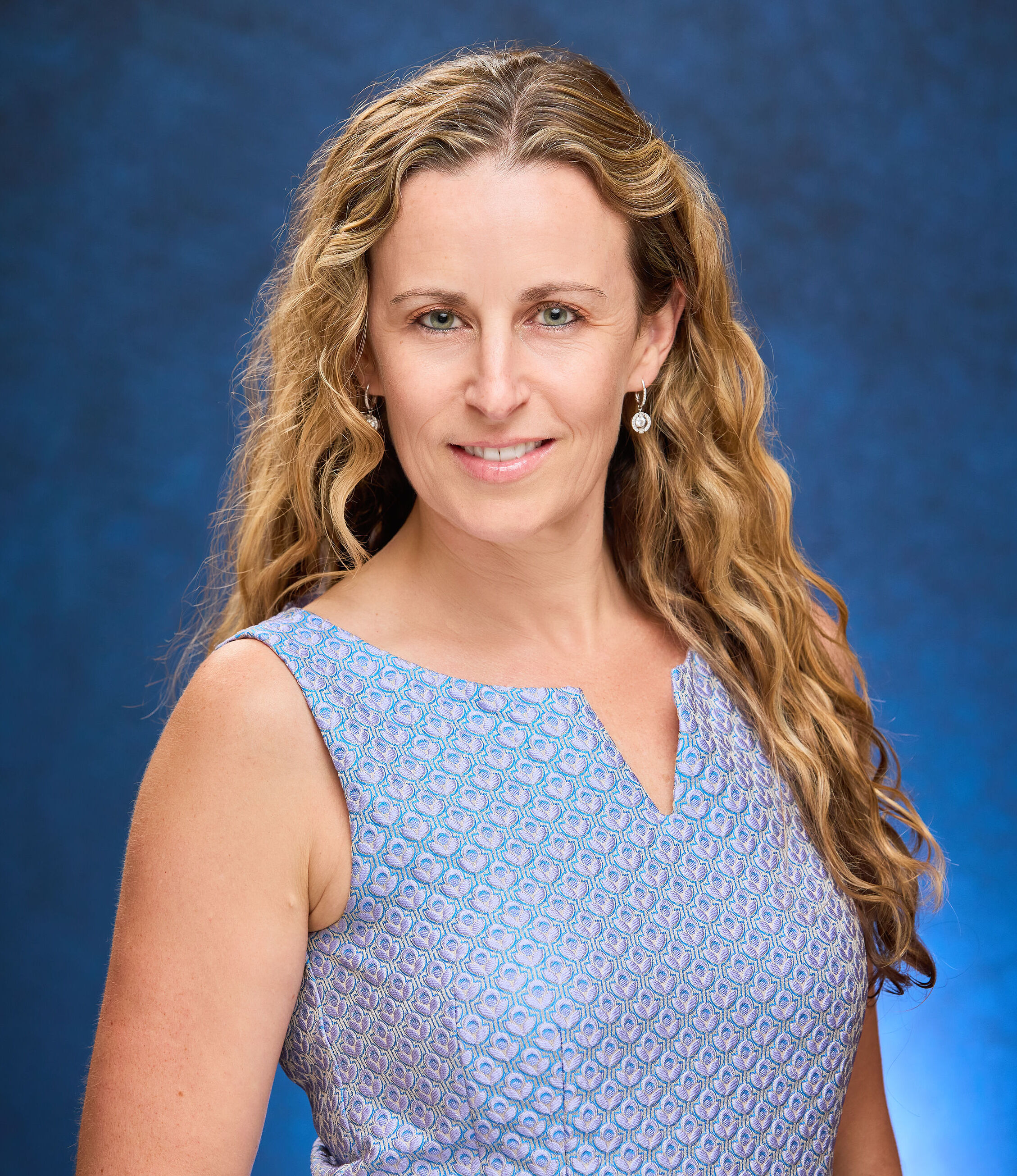
- Kleinstreuer in 2023
- Education: University of North Carolina at Chapel Hill; University of Canterbury
- Scientific career
- Fields: Computational toxicology
- Workplaces: National Institutes of Health

Nicole Kleinstreuer is an American computational toxicologist. She is the acting deputy director for program coordination, planning, and strategic initiatives at the National Institutes of Health (NIH). Kleinstreuer is known for her work in developing alternatives to animal testing and became the center of a public debate regarding the pace of phasing out animal research in 2025.

== Education ==
Kleinstreuer earned B.S. degrees in biomedical engineering and applied mathematics from the University of North Carolina at Chapel Hill and a Ph.D. in bioengineering from the University of Canterbury. She completed postdoctoral training at the U.S. Environmental Protection Agency in computational toxicology.

== Career ==
Kleinstreuer served as director of the National Toxicology Program Interagency Center for the Evaluation of Alternative Toxicological Methods (NICEATM), located within the National Institute of Environmental Health Sciences (NIEHS). She was also the executive director of the Interagency Coordinating Committee on the Validation of Alternative Methods (ICCVAM) and the U.S. National Co-Coordinator for the Organisation for Economic Co-operation and Development (OECD) Test Guidelines Programme. In these roles, she led efforts to promote new approach methodologies, reduce animal testing, and integrate computational modeling and artificial intelligence into regulatory science. Her work spans predictive modeling, translational bioinformatics, and quantitative risk assessment. Kleinstreuer received the including the 2019 Society of Toxicology Achievement Award and the 2025 Enhancement of Animal Welfare Award.

In 2025, Kleinstreuer was named the acting National Institutes of Health (NIH) deputy director for program coordination, planning, and strategic initiatives, where she was chosen to help lead a new office working to reduce the use of animals in NIH-funded research. Her appointment drew praise from some animal rights groups, including People for the Ethical Treatment of Animals (PETA). However, she also became the target of an aggressive campaign by an advocacy group called the White Coat Waste Project (WCW), which asserted that she and the NIH were not moving fast enough to end animal research. The group's criticism was amplified by conservative political activists, leading to online attacks and death threats against Kleinstreuer on social media platforms. According to emails from a colleague, the threats prompted 24-hour police protection for Kleinstreuer and her family, as well as inquiries from the Federal Bureau of Investigation.

=== Views on Animal Research ===
Kleinstreuer has stated that she has never worked with animals in her toxicology studies. In a 2025 online chat, she commented, "Animal testing for some people is like a religion... They have been sort of fooled into believing that that's the only model that can be used to answer [questions] about human health and disease." She has also maintained that an immediate end to all animal research is not practical. "We have no intention of just phasing out animal studies overnight," she said in a June 2025 interview. "We know that animal studies are still very important and often scientifically justified. There are lots of areas where validated human-relevant models are not yet available."
