= Angelita C. et al. v. California Department of Pesticide Regulation =

1999 complaint about methyl bromide use

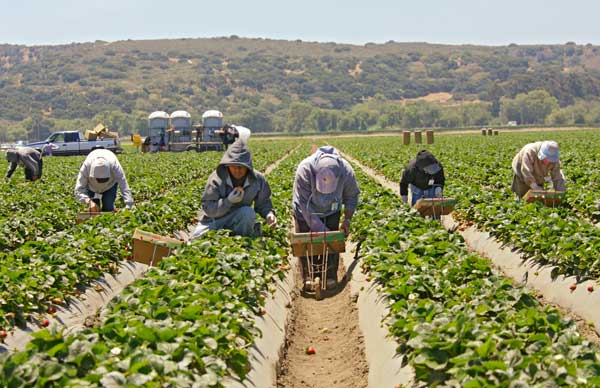
- Men bending and kneeling to pick low-hanging strawberries near Salinas
- Decided: April 22, 2011

Case history
- Prior action: Filed in 1999
- Appealed from: US Environmental Protection Agency
- Appealed to: 9th Circuit Court of Appeals
- Subsequent action: Dismissed

Case opinions
- Decision by: Office of Civil Rights, US Environmental Protection Agency

Keywords
- Pesticide regulation; Migrant workers; Environmental safety

Angelita C. et al. v. California Department of Pesticide Regulation is an administrative complaint filed in June 1999 with the US Environmental Protection Agency about disproportionate harm to Latino children from toxic pesticides used near schools. It said that the California Department of Pesticide Regulation (CDPR) had caused discriminatory harm to Latino children when it renewed the registration for methyl bromide in January 1999 without considering the effect on nearby schools, which in some cases lay immediately adjacent to the fields.

Title VI of the federal Civil Rights Act of 1964 prohibits recipients of federal funds from discriminating, even through unintended effects of neutral legislation. California has a similar law, section 11135.

== Background ==
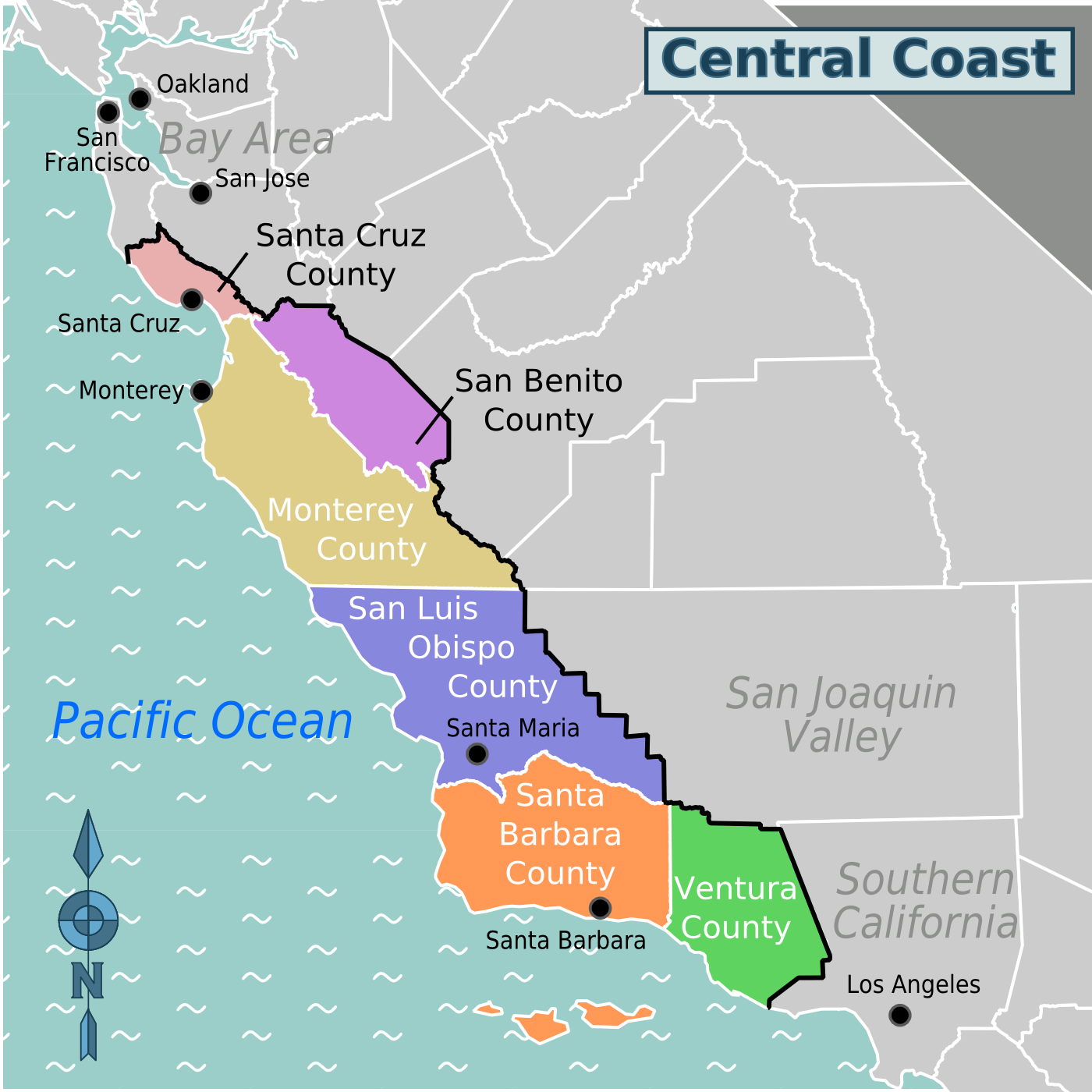
Map of Central Coast counties in California

Strawberry cultivation is a billion-dollar industry in Central California. California supplies 90% of the nation's strawberries.

In addition to strawberries, Salinas Valley grows lettuce and has been called the salad bowl of the nation. It and the city of Monterey were the setting for some of John Steinbeck's novels. While etched into American consciousness by the photography of Dorothea Lange and John Ford's adaptation of The Grapes of Wrath starring Henry Fonda, the Dust Bowl Okies who streamed into California in the 1930s were historical anomalies. Mexicans had been migrating north to work in those fields since the 19th century.

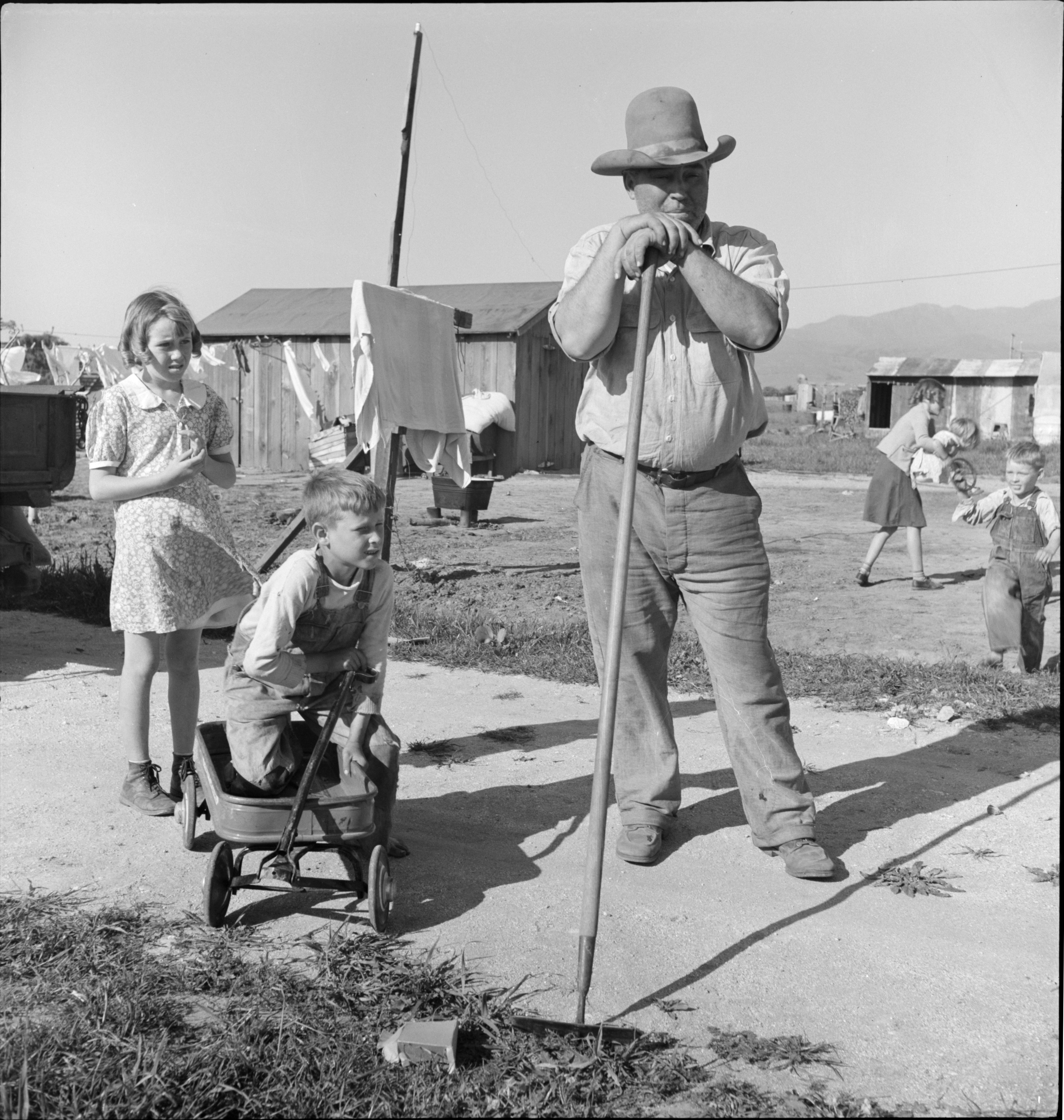
Migrant family in Salinas. Dorothea Lange, United States Library of Congress

The complaint was named "Angelita C." after the mother of a student at Ohlone Elementary School in Pajaro, where it is surrounded by strawberry fields. Another three schools were in Pajaro and Salinas in Monterey County. Another was in Santa Cruz County near Watsonville. Two were in Oxnard in Ventura County, including Rio Mesa High, attended by the son of Maria Garcia, who later appealed the settlement of Angelita C. after the subsequent recertification of methyl bromide as a pesticide as if Angelita C. had never happened.

=== Agriculture ===
Some 25 million acres of California's 101 million total make up the 77,000 farms in the state. The average farm size is well below the national average. California has the largest agricultural economy in the country by revenue, and generated more than $46 billion in 2013 on farms that are smaller than the nationwide average. (Note: 327 acres v. 435)

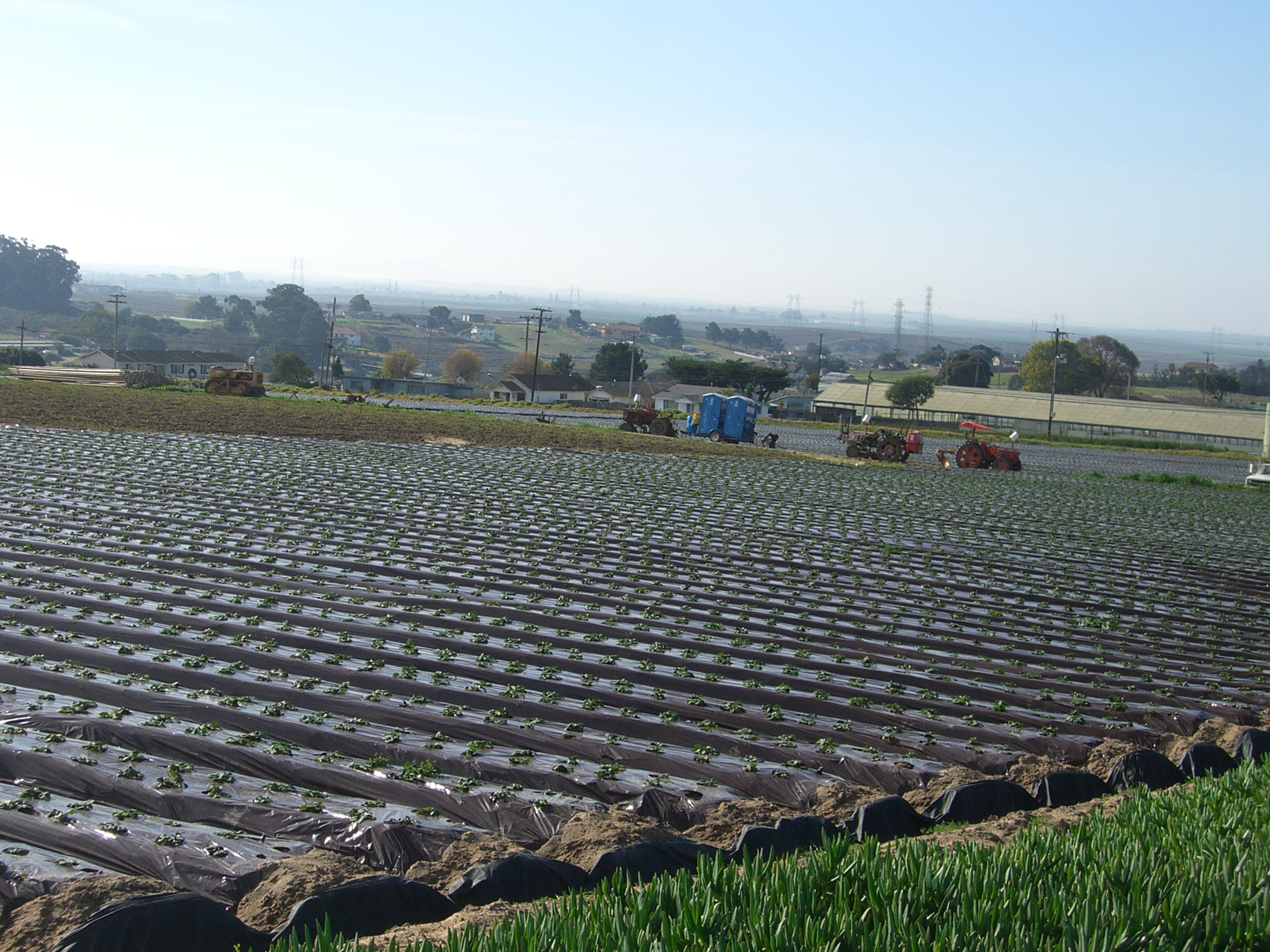
Strawberry fields near Elkhorn

The University of California, Davis has had a strawberry breeding program since the 1930s that generated about 60% of California's strawberry plants. Two high yield varieties released in 2019, Moxie and Royal Royce, may increase strawberry yield as much as 29 percent.

Between 1960 and 2014, agricultural acreage more than tripled in California and production increased tenfold. The value of production, in real (inflation-adjusted) dollars, increased by 424% in Monterey County and by 593% in Santa Cruz County, reaching an astonishing combined value of nearly $1 billion in both 2010 and 2014.

California grows 90% of the strawberries produced in the United States, many of them on the Central Coast. By 2022 strawberry production for Monterey County alone had reached $958.7 million.

==== Farmworker families ====
Oaxaca indigenous people

These strawberries were almost entirely harvested by poorly paid Mixtec and Triqui workers from Oaxaca. through back-breaking stoop labor in toxic working conditions. About 75% of the farmworkers in California were undocumented in 2014 and in Santa Cruz County the percentage was 83%. An estimated 165,000 California farmworkers are indigenous Mexicans. More than half speak Mixteco and another 30 percent speak Zapoteco.

But the increase in acres in production may have been due to cheap and available land in southern Monterey County. Agricultural acreage peaked and began to shrink. Migrant farm-workers kept coming, as they have since the bracero program began in 1942, mostly from the same Mixteco villages. Most of these fieldworkers had a fifth grade education in Spanish at best, let alone English. Wage theft, crippling production quotas and predatory sharecropping arrangements and extremely toxic work environments have historically been routine. Workers share rooms with up to three other people in squalid pest-infested structures whose roofs may leak or whose plumbing may not work, Some prefer to live outdoors altogether.

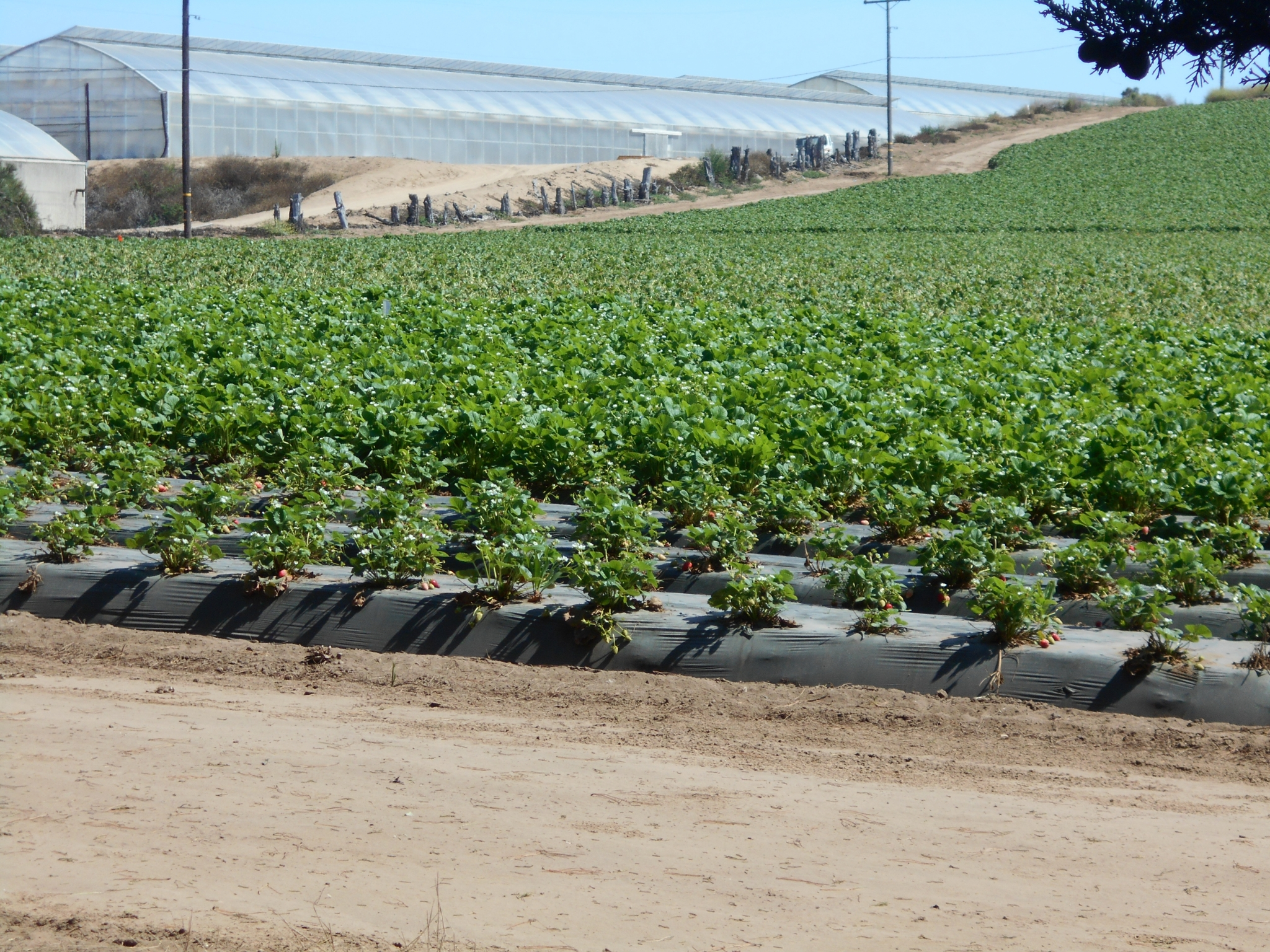
Strawberry field near Watsonville, with tarp to mitigate pesticide drift

A 2008 study using 2005 data by the Institute of Spatial Analysis and the California Center for Rural Policy at Humboldt State found that 593 acres of agricultural land fell within a quarter-mile of Salinas schools. But pesticide drift is not the only means of exposure, cautioned a study author: “Everyone living in that region,” is a farm-worker, and thousands of farm-workers carry the chemicals home on their clothing, or into public places. An early finding of the National Institute of Health's Agricultural Health Study was that "participants could be exposed to pesticides through living near where pesticides were mixed or stored, and laundering clothing worn during pesticide application".

The risks to farmworkers and their families specifically are in addition to the health risks to the rural population as a whole. The US Centers for Disease Control (CDC) estimates, for example, that rural populations are four times less likely to have access to healthy food. Rural communities are poorer, more elderly, and lack transportation and access to health services. They see a higher rate of excess deaths from cancer and cardiovascular disease.

=== Legal ===
Title VI of the Civil Rights Act of 1964 and its implementing regulations prohibit recipients of federal financial funding from discriminating based on race, color, or national origin, whether the disproportionate harm is intentional or simply a disproportionate effect of a neutral policy.

However, in 2001 the US Supreme Court ruled in Alexander v. Sandoval that individuals have no right to sue over the discriminatory effects of government actions, (Note: "no individual cause of action") and the United States Environmental Protection Agency (EPA) itself is responsible for overseeing and investigating its own actions under Title VI regulations outlined in 40 C.F.R. Part 7. The plaintiffs filed an administrative complaint about disproportionately harmful effects on non-white schoolchildren because the California Department of Pesticide Regulation received federal funds.

=== Environment ===
Soil fumigation with chloropicrin (CP) was first introduced in the 1950s and methyl bromide (MB) in the 1960s to improve productivity. Arthropods, nematodes, weeds, fungi and pathogens like Verticillium dahliae, Fusarium oxysporum, and Macrophomina phaseolina can destroy a harvest. Early on, CP and MB were mixed together to allow strawberries to be produced as an annual rather than biennial crop without crop rotation. Fumigants also led to higher and more predictable yields and fruit quality. Strawberry yields statewide ranged from two to four tons an acre before fumigants and reached 16 tons an acre by 1969.

The Montreal Protocol, an international environmental agreement first signed in 1987 in an effort to reduce damage to the ozone layer, included methyl bromine among the chemicals to be phased out because it breaks down in the atmosphere, especially in sunlight, and releases destructive bromine radicals that can take up to two years to break down completely. In 2012 California growers were still using 3.8 million pounds of methyl bromide on 30,000 treated acres, compared to 6.5 million pounds on 53,000 treated acres in 2002, through waivers granted by the EPA.

== Complaint ==
Filed by the Center for Race, Poverty & the Environment, California Rural Legal Assistance and the Farmworker Justice Fund, Inc. on behalf of Latino parents and children at six California schools, complaint 16R-99-R9 said that the CDPR renewal of the registration of methyl bromide caused disproportionate health harm to Latino school children due to their over-representation in schools near the fields where the pesticide was used.

Research by the complainants found that all schools near the release of methyl bromide had a student population that was majority non-white. The student populations of Virginia Rocca Barton Elementary School in Salinas and Ohlone Elementary School both were more than 95% ethnic. In 1995 complainants found that a total of 75,000 pounds of methyl bromide was released within a 1.5 mile radius of 476 students. Notably, the spraying occurred from mid-August through late May, while school was in session.

== Investigation ==
To calculate whether or not spraying methyl bromide had an adverse effect on children in the vicinity, the OCR used data from 1995 to 2001 in the CDPR's previously developed model. and found that both short-term and long-term exposure levels exceeded the EPA's threshold of concern (35 ppb and 1.3 ppb, respectively). It also found merit to the claim of a disproportionate adverse effect on Latino schoolchildren between 1995 and 2001. This was, it said, enough evidence of a prima facie violation of Title VI. This was the EPA's first ever and to date only finding of a prima facie violation.

Many limitations of the EPA investigation impaired its outcome. An open letter to the OCR signed by a long list of advocates in response to a 2016 proposal to loosen its accountability requirements scathingly noted among many other enforcement failures that the agency had taken "nearly twelve years" to respond to Angelita C., which by the EPA's own standards should have had preliminary findings within 180 days. "While the complaint languished, Latino schoolchildren were exposed on a daily basis to toxic pesticides," they said. Even then, another author angrily wrote, the EPA essentially "told the CDPR 'Just try to help people stay out of the way.'" The EPA excluded complainants from the investigation, and did not notify the plaintiffs of its finding of discrimination until it announced the settlement agreement, without giving any relief to Latino schoolchildren from pesticide exposure during mandatory school attendance.

In 2011 when the settlement was reached, the EPA planned to replace methyl bromide with methyl iodide, which breaks down within 12 days and does not deplete the ozone layer. A plaintiffs' attorney in the methyl bromide complaint said:

I still do not know why EPA did not include the fumigants that were replacing methyl bromide. They know about the Montreal Protocol. They administer the Montreal Protocol. They know what the pattern of use had to be. Now, if they didn’t do it because they’re incompetent, that’s a problem. If they knew about it and they decided to deliberately restrict their investigation to only methyl bromide, then that’s an even bigger problem. They would be ignoring evidence that’s material to the investigation.

As a "carcinogen, neurotoxin, and endocrine disruptor" the adverse health effects of methyl iodide on farmworkers and others in the vicinity of its use turned out to be if anything worse than methyl bromide's, and its manufacturer withdrew it from the US market ahead of a decision in litigation brought by Earthjustice.

== Regulation ==
=== California Department of Pesticide Regulation ===
"Ongoing, systematic and widespread violations of the civil rights of residents and workers in California's farmworking communities, both through actively discriminatory policies that cause disproportionate harm, but more pervasively through failure to investigate, to protect and to enforce existing state laws and regulations,” have occurred, according to Jane Sellen of the Environmental Health Sciences Center of the University of California at Davis.

A lawsuit filed March 29, 2024 in Monterey Superior Court against the California DPR and the Monterey County Agricultural Commissioner by Earthjustice on behalf of the Pajaro Valley Federation of Teachers, Safe Ag Safe Schools, Center for Farmworker Families, Monterey Bay Central Labor Council and Californians for Pesticide Reform alleged that students at three schools in the Pajaro Valley—including one named in the original Angelita C. complaint—are exposed to more than twice the levels of 1,3-dichloropropene (1,3-D) that the CDR has said was the maximum safe dose, yet the DPR continues to routinely approve applications for further use of the chemical.

=== EPA ===
Methyl iodide was approved for use in the United States despite its health risks, after EPA director Stephen Johnson appointed as a regulator Elin Miller, previously the CEO of the North American branch of Arysta, the Japanese manufacturer of methyl iodide. The eminent science journal Nature accused Johnson, a George W. Bush appointee, of "reckless disregard for law, science or the agency's own rules — or, it seems, the anguished protests of his own subordinates." After the approval of methyl iodide's registration as a pesticide available in the United States, Arysta sold for $2.2 billion.

In 2006, the Japanese chemical giant Arysta presented it to the EPA as the perfect candidate to replace methyl bromide. The pitch: It works just as well on nematodes, but it doesn’t harm the ozone layer. As for farmworkers, well…

Fifty-four scientists signed a letter of protest to the EPA strongly recommending against its approval, citing omissions of peer-reviewed evidence, failure to document the modeling used, missing information and failure to identify vulnerable subpopulations. The agency's assessment of risk to nearby populations also incorrectly treated exposure as "missing" and it should have used the AERMOD model instead. Estimates of risk due to the length of the workday; "exposure during tarp removal is completely uncharacterized," they said, and "air filtering respirators are inappropriately relied on and respiratory protection factors are overestimated."

"We have had the administrator come in and, in my opinion, lie to this committee." fumed Senator Sheldon Whitehouse of Rhode Island at a 2008 hearing of the United States Senate Committee on Environment and Public Works. "This looks like an agency that is now captive in the hands of industry, and is led by people whose job is not to follow the science, is not to protect the public, but is to deliver for the industry and then say whatever nonsense is necessary to try to cover their tracks."

A 2015 review by the Center for Public Integrity of 265 complaints submitted to the civil-rights office found that "settlements are rare, investigations often cursory and findings of discrimination all but non-existent." Dismissal of complaints by the EPA was the outcome 90% of the time. Documents obtained by the CRPE, representing the plaintiffs, showed that the Office of Pesticide Programs objected to measures suggested by the Office of Civil Rights, such as impermeable films and buffer zones, as it felt that these measures implied that the long-term exposure thresholds established by the EPA had been inadequate. The agency has only ever pulled the registration for 37 pesticides, four of them between 2000 and 2010, and only one since. It has registered more than 16,800 pesticide products and 1,200 active ingredients.

EPA managers at a November 18, 2020 meeting asked the information technology contractors building a tracking system for chemical reviews to add a new button to the interface to allow them to bypass the scientists and send high-priority cases straight to management for approval.

Reporting by The Intercept in 2021 found that pesticide manufacturers frequently hired agency employees and "more than two dozen experts on pesticide regulation — including 14 who worked at the EPA's Office of Pesticide Programs" said the industry spends tens of millions of dollars on lobbying agency employees. Agency whistleblowers described physical intimidation and abusive language, and managers were evaluated on the number of chemicals they approved and whistleblowers reported hearing them advise manufacturer representatives on cellphones to avoid creating public records. "An assessment of 1,3-D that the Environmental Protection Agency issued in 2020 is fraudulent", according to a complaint the environmental group Public Employees for Environmental Responsibility (PEER) submitted to the EPA's Office of Inspector General in February 2021. "If you do decide to work for the [EPA] pesticide program and you go up against the agricultural interest, it will not be good for your career,” former EPA employee Karen McCormack, a veteran of forty years with the agency, told Al Jazeera English in December 2023.

=== United States Congress ===
Changes in migration law have greatly altered the landscape for migrant workers. Quoting Rudolf Virchow's observation that “Medicine is a social science, and politics is nothing else but medicine on a large scale” Seth M. Holmes noted in his study of migrant farmworker health that "the nexus of political economic structures driving migration with legal structures barring entry to immigrants and widespread anti-immigrant sentiments proves unhealthy and dangerous." Political developments have made life harder for these workers, from bills to give local police the authority to investigate and enforce federal immigration laws, new fences and increased militarization of the US-Mexico border to the George W. Bush proposal of a "poorly defined temporary worker program that appears to make the power differential between worker and employer even greater than it is already."

Pressure on EPA regulators often came from lawmakers. At a 2006 hearing of the House Committee on Agriculture's Subcommittee on Conservation, Credit, Rural Development, and Research, EPA Assistant Administrator James B Gulliford of the Pesticides and Toxic Substances branch was aggressively questioned by Congressman Bob Etheridge of North Carolina about methyl bromide and critical use exemptions. Joe Schwarz of Michigan wanted to know "...why we are not doing more to perhaps try to extricate at least partially from our obligations under the Montreal so that agriculture can use methyl bromide in greater volumes than it is now." He added that methyl bromide "was introduced over 70 years ago and there is no real evidence that there is any kind of a health hazard for humans or there is any runoff because of the gas."

== Aftermath ==
After the EPA issued a preliminary finding against the CDPR on April 22, 2011, it began private settlement discussions with the defendant, to which the complainants were not invited. On August 24, 2011, the EPA and CDPR reached an informal compliance agreement. An appeal of this administrative decision was denied. In 2014 the strawberry growers of California still accounted for roughly 90% of the methyl bromide use in the developed world.

In Garcia v. McCarthy the plaintiffs appealed to first to the District Court for Northern California, (Note: No. 3:13-cv-03939 WHO) then to the US 9th Circuit Court of Appeals, saying that the settlement did not provide recourse to those exposed; the CDPR made no changes to the pesticide's registration in 2013 and re-registered and lawfully certified it as of January 26, 2012, despite its own finding of discriminatory harm. The plaintiffs said that the EPA failed to investigate health effects and “arbitrarily and capriciously” negotiated a voluntary compliance agreement that did not protect schoolchildren and that plaintiffs were excluded from the investigation and the settlement negotiations. The court granted a motion to dismiss, saying that despite the "lamentable" delay the agency was empowered to settle the matter as it saw fit.

An April 2014 report by California's Environmental Health Tracking Program found that Hispanic children were more likely to attend schools near the fields and farms that used the most pesticides of public health concern: 46% more likely than White children to attend schools where any pesticides of concern were used nearby, and 91% more likely than White children to attend schools that w ere in the highest quartile of nearby use.

The director of the California Department of Pesticide Regulation noted in an editorial published in the Sacramento Bee in 2015 that "because land use is a local affair, school locations are exempt from the General Plan and other measures designed to ensure thoughtful planning. As a result, schools are sometimes built on prime agricultural land in the middle of existing farm operations." He said he had directed his staff to draft new regulations and that the depaatment would hold a series of hearings on the subject. When the revised rules were published, they only prohibited pesticide application from 6 a.m. to 6 p.m. on weekdays, within a quarter mile of the schools. A spokesperson confirmed that grower pushback in the public comment period had led the department to drop a requirement to give 48 hours notice before spraying.

in 2018, California counties with a majority Latino population used more than 900% more pesticides per square mile than those with less than 25% Latino populations.

== Health risks ==
Numerous health risks have been linked to the pesticides sprayed on its fields. Most notably, some of these chemicals have been associated with high diastolic blood pressure and pulse pressure in women, as well as cardiovascular disease. Some may also increase the risk of developing cardiovascular disease in the future.

All of the alternatives to methyl bromide also pose health risks. A mixture has been considered a likely alternative, but the low solubility of the chemicals means a risk of groundwater contamination.

=== Methyl bromide ===
Methyl bromide is a neurotoxin.

Accidental poisonings with methyl bromide have been recorded, but few cases documented the concentrations or duration of exposure. It is practically odorless, even at lethal doses, and can cause headaches, mental disturbances, nausea, vomiting and lung edema. According to the National Research Council, "Daily exposure to methyl bromide at 35 ppm (with possible dermal contact) and acute exposures to several hundred ppm can cause mild to severe symptoms".

=== 1,3-Dichloropropene ===
The US National Institute for Occupational Safety and Health (NIOSH) considers 1,3-Dichloropropene (1,3-D), sold under the brand name Telone, a carcinogen. Telone was also for years contaminated with 1,2,3-trichloropropane (TCP), another extremely potent carcinogen that persists for centuries, even though the label claimed it had no inert ingredients for the "sales advantage", according to filings in some of the ensuing litigation. The pesticide also causes respiratory problems.

During the Trump administration the federal EPA downgraded the assessed cancer risk of 1,3-D. The inspector-general of the EPA said the move "could lead to significant increases in exposure levels to humans and affect the pesticide's application rate and level of personal protective equipment required by applicators. The EPA needs to take action to improve the scientific credibility of and bolster public trust in the Agency's 1,3-D decision." The Pajaro Valley environmental group Safe Ag/Safe Schools in 2022 called for an increasing the quarter-mile buffer zone around schools, noting that a school in Shafter in Kern County had recorded one of the highest 1,3-D levels ever from an application of 1,3-D in a field 7.5 miles away.

California's Office of Environmental Health Hazard Assessment (OEHHA) set a maximum safe exposure level of 0.04 parts per billion in June 2023. Draft regulations DPR published in November 2023 set the level to 0.56 ppb, 14 times higher than its own employees had said was the maximum safe dose.

=== Chloropicrin ===
US EPA re-approved chloropicrin (PS) in 2008 as safe for use in agricultural settings, stating that treatments "can provide benefits to both food consumers and growers. For consumers, it means more fresh fruits and vegetables can be cheaply produced domestically year-round because several severe pest problems can be efficiently controlled." The EPA requires supervision, training and certification of applicators, buffer zones, notice of pesticide application, and fumigant management plans. The US National Institute for Occupational Safety and Health considers it a lung-damaging agent and warns that it may explode.

== See also ==
- 1986 California Proposition 65
- Administrative Procedure Act
- California Agricultural Labor Relations Act of 1975
- California Environmental Quality Act
- Federal Insecticide, Fungicide, and Rodenticide Act
- Food Quality Protection Act
- Heckler v. Chaney
- Migrant and Seasonal Agricultural Workers Protection Act of 1983
- Plasticulture
- Salad Bowl strike
- United Farm Workers
