= Earlimart pesticide poisoning =

1999 incident in California, US

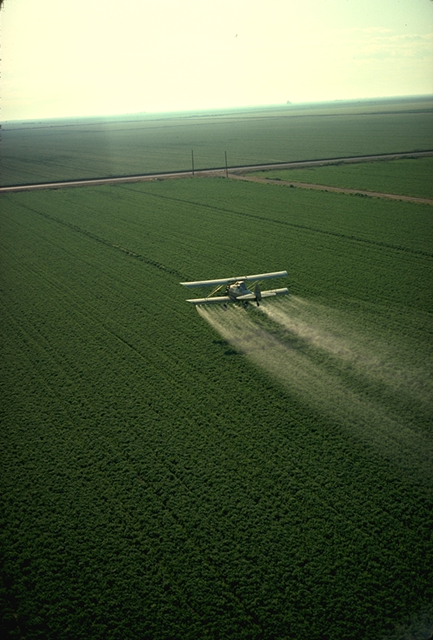
pesticides being sprayed over California farm

The Earlimart pesticide poisoning refers to a November 13, 1999 pesticide drift event which occurred in the vicinity of a community in the middle of the San Joaquin Valley. This event saw 24 victims sent to hospital after coming into contact with the pesticides directly, and a further 150 people were ordered to evacuate the township. Residents were exposed to the compound metham sodium, a highly toxic fumigant used in weed-targeting pesticides. The 24 poison victims suffered severe effects including vomiting, nausea, reoccurring headaches, and respiratory dysfunction. The incident is worthy of note due to its influence in contemporaneous public advocacy against pesticide use broadly, as well as a catalyst perceived to have increased awareness on pesticide drift in general.

== Detection ==
The incident began when the Wilbur-Ellis Company fumigated 75 acres worth of potatoes field in a plantation near Earlimart. The pesticides sprayed on the field eventually drifted as a cloud into the Earlimart community. The cloud drifted its way into the homes of residents of Earlimart and the potato farm workers. As a result, the people exposed to the fumigant were hosed down and evacuated from the contaminated areas.

== People ==
The consistent use of toxic pesticides has been an ongoing trend in the Central Valley as many organizations and government agencies have heavily relied on these chemicals to promote the agricultural industry. However, these harmful pesticides prove to be more threatening than harmful as people and young children have been exposed to these pesticides as they are transferred from person to person.

There has been correlation with the number of people compacted in a certain area due to suburban sprawl. Suburban sprawl is the act of expansion of population through development and such this concept had affected the movement of pesticides, further impacting society. Also, many people were ultimately hospitalized due to the pesticide drift associated with agriculture.

== Environment ==
Not only do pesticides "positively" affect agriculture, but also influences food supplies due to the possibility of exposure to pesticides. The usage of pesticides finds its way in the food supply chain, which continues to impact the overall health of those surrounded by the environment. The decreasing of pesticide reliance would increase our health in order to live a more sustainable and cleanliness life. Those who lived in or near the place of Earlimart have a higher chance of cancer because of a long-term exposure to pesticides which tends to be chronic.

== Activist/Groups ==
As a result of this event, activism took place. There are people who are concerned about ongoing health effects after being sprayed. "Pesticide concentrations in the air frequently exceed levels of health concern." Once activists noticed ineffective emergency response and slow response/reaction from regulatory agencies, activists formed. A committee was formed to oversee Earlimart's well-being, "El Comite Para El Bienestar de Earlimart". "

Teresa de Anda once lead this community-based organization and is a central factor in the statewide movement to illuminate and contest the problems associated with pesticide drift.". After the original Earlimart incident in 1999, other groups, collective residents, joined forces with CPR, Californians for Pesticide Reform. "CPR member organizations tackle pesticide pollution in air and water and on food from many different approaches.".

== Lawsuits ==
The residents of Earlimart and the state pesticide chief, Paul Helliker, brought the incident to court. A public hearing took place at 6pm on Wednesday, May 31, 2000, at the Earlimart Memorial Building. The court hearing resulted in a $150,000 total settlement from Wilbur-Ellis Company, $75,000 in civil penalties and another $75,000 for the victims' medical expenses. Aside from the settlement, the Wilbur-Ellis Company agreed to provide safety training for employees using the pesticide.

== SB 391 ==
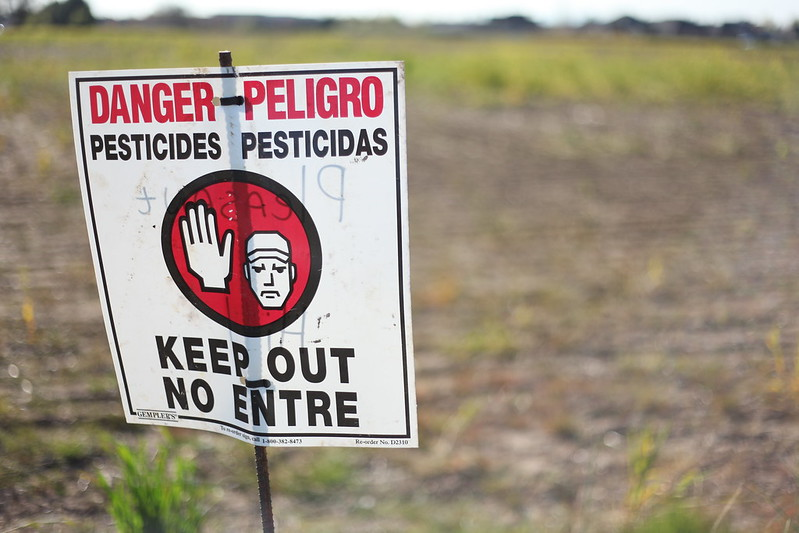
Red and white caution sign signaling to not enter the designated area behind the sign. (unknown exact source)

The Earlimart pesticide drift resulted in a widespread awareness of pesticide usage. Senate bill 391, otherwise known as the Pesticide Drift Exposure Response Act was an act passed in 2005 in response to an increase in pesticide drift incidents in California. This act enforces stricter laws and regulations for pesticide use and to help the victims of pesticide drifts. Those who violate these regulations will be held accountable and fined for any victims stemming from the pesticide use.

The strict regulations in regards to the Earlimart pesticide drift ultimately provided the necessary awareness to decrease the poor air quality and other vital aspects in the environment. With more regulations and laws, people are protected under the national and local government as they are no longer experiencing these strong circumstances.

== See also ==
- Pesticide incidents in the San Joaquin Valley
