= California Governor's Office of Emergency Services =

State government agency

The California Governor's Office of Emergency Services (Cal OES) is a California cabinet-level office responsible for overseeing and coordinating emergency preparedness, response, recovery and homeland security activities within the state. The agency was created by AB 38 (2008), superseding both the Office of Emergency Services (OES) and Office of Homeland Security (OHS).

== History ==
Cal OES administers the California State Nonprofit Security Grant Program. After the Poway synagogue shooting, the California State Legislature passed AB 1548 to establish the California State Nonprofit Security Grant Program in 2019, awarding up to $200,000 per year to religious, political, and mission-based institutions. The state allocated $12 million to the program in 2019. Security grants had previously been a line item in the state budget since 2015.

In 2024, then-Deputy Director Ryan Buras resigned from Cal OES. In his resignation letter, he cited his family’s decision to move back to the East Coast as the reason for his departure. Less than two weeks later, Kendra Bowyer, a Cal OES employee who worked under Buras, filed a lawsuit alleging that Buras had sexually harassed her. Cal OES said an external law firm investigated the allegations and found that no organizational policies had been violated. In a separate lawsuit filed in 2020, former employee Steven Larson alleged that Cal OES retaliated against him after he reported potential fraud and sexual-harassment concerns. In July 2025, a civil jury ruled in favor of Cal OES and Buras in Larson’s case. That verdict concerned Larson’s case, not the separate allegations in other lawsuits.

== Organization ==
=== Executive Division ===
On July 1, 2013, Mark Ghilarducci was appointed by Governor Jerry Brown. Previously, he served as the new secretary of the California Emergency Management Agency (Cal EMA).

=== Homeland Security Division ===
This division provides grant management, handling over $1 billion in grants from the U.S. Department of Homeland Security and other Federal agencies.

The State Threat Assessment Center (STAC) and the California Cybersecurity Integration Center (Cal-CSIC) fall under the Homeland Security Division.

The Office of Infrastructure Protection coordinates at all government levels to ensure that the critical infrastructure in the state is adequately secured against attack or disaster.

The Homeland Security Training and Exercise branches develop and distribute training materials and develop exercises to ensure that the first responders of the state are adequately prepared for responses to Weapons of Mass Destruction (WMD) or Chemical, Biological, Radiological, Nuclear, or Explosive (CBRNE) emergencies.

The Information Analysis, Watch, and Warning Division (IAWWD) provides structure, guidance and funding to the California State Terrorism Threat Assessment System, which encompasses the State Terrorism Threat Assessment Center (STTAC) that was designated by former Governor Arnold Schwarzenegger as the state's Fusion Center. Information Analysis, Watch, and Warning collaborates with the California Highway Patrol, Federal and state public safety agencies, and various Homeland Security partners to ensure that the Governor and key senior leadership officials are provided with timely situational awareness information that has security implications for California.

The Planning, Research, and Emergency Preparedness (PREP) coordinates the State's planning efforts and strategic development to achieve preparedness priorities related to Homeland Security and disasters. The guiding principles of the PREP Division are coordination, collaboration, and communication with our local, state, Federal, tribal, and private sector partners in support of the goals set forth by the Governor and Homeland Security Presidential Directives.

=== Office of Administrative Services ===
The Cal OES Office of Administrative Services provides timely customer service-based administrative policy and procedures as well as the advice, service, and support needed to manage Cal OES employees and external customers. Supporting Cal OES, which has approximately 590 employees and an operating budget of more than $80 million, the office administers a wide array of services including Fiscal Management, Human Resources, Labor Relations, and Business Services Programs.

During disaster response and recovery operations, the office works to ensure personnel staffing needs are met, while working to make sure the logistical needs and facility operations are managed. On a daily basis the office ensures the physical operation of the 118,000-square-foot (11,000 m^{2}) Cal OES headquarters in Mather, California runs smoothly.

The Office of Administrative Services is responsible for providing administrative, financial, human resources, facility operations management, labor relations, and business services to the agency. The office is divided into three areas:

The Fiscal Services Division has program responsibility over the Accounting Branch, Accounts Receivable and Debt Collection Branch, and Budget and Fiscal Analysis Branch. This division has all fiscal responsibilities within the agency. The division builds the Governor's Budget, processes payments for all local assistance and state operations, builds and manages program budget allotments, directly assists programs with fiscal information related to expenditures and projections.

The Human Resources Branch (HR) is divided into three sections: Personnel Office, Labor Relations Office, and Recruitment and Selection Services (RSS). Responsibilities include labor relations, classification and pay, payroll and benefits, workers' compensation, reasonable accommodations, recruitment, and examinations.

The Office of Grants Management (OGM) is divided into two branches which are responsible for monitoring emergency management, homeland security, and law enforcement and victim services grants to ensure grant expenditures fully comply with applicable regulations and requirements.

The Procurement and Logistical Services Branch consists of the Procurement and Property Control Section and the Business Services Section.

=== Preparedness and Training ===
The division's Preparedness Branch is responsible for working with state agencies and local governments on emergency planning efforts. The division is leading a new administration effort to reinvigorate the Standardized Emergency Management System (SEMS) and its Maintenance System. The Maintenance System consists of an advisory board (state and local officials representing the policy and executive levels of government), a technical group (from federal, state, and local agencies, tribal governments, private sector, and volunteer and non-governmental organizations), specialist committees (Technical Group members), and the Mutual Aid Regional Advisory Committees (MARACs) (six committees consisting of primarily local government and regional state agencies).

The Hazard Mitigation Branch is responsible for reviewing applications for the federal Hazard Mitigation Grant Program, the Pre-Disaster Mitigation Grant Program and local hazard mitigation plans. The Branch is also responsible for the State Multi-Hazard Mitigation Plan. On October 8, 2007, FEMA approved the California's State Multi-Hazard Mitigation Plan. This approval continues the State's eligibility for FEMA disaster recovery and mitigation grant programs that have provided

The California Governor's Office of Emergency Services Training Division and the California Specialized Training Institute provide support to the First Responder community of California by providing training referrals, and the coordinated delivery of training and training materials. This is accomplished by developing partnerships with federal, state and local training providers. The Cal OES Earthquake Program provides specialized earthquake preparedness planning and technical assistance to local governments, business, schools, hospitals, the public and other groups.

=== Statewide Operations Division ===
From the on-set of a disaster to the removal of debris, the firefighters and emergency managers of the Statewide Operations Division are working to meet the needs of California's 58 county operational areas. In 2009, this team of professionals managed the response to and recovery from major disasters while also addressing the tsunami risk in California.

==== Law Enforcement Division ====
Since 1960, the Cal OES Law Enforcement Division has provided valuable services to support California's law enforcement agencies. The Law Enforcement Division works directly with the 58 California Sheriffs along with Police Departments, University Police, as well as other federal, state and local law enforcement agencies. The Law Enforcement Division, with its longstanding leadership role in the coordination of local law enforcement mutual aid requests, including coroner mass fatality and search & rescue incidents, deploys law enforcement assets to disaster scenes and provides law enforcement mutual aid guidance. Each year, Search and Rescue (SAR) assignments consume much of the branch staff's time and effort, as they support the Local Law Enforcement response to SAR Incidents and coordinate the statewide mutual aid response. Last year, Cal OES coordinated mutual aid resource deployments on nearly 600 SAR missions. From searching for missing hikers or skiers to conducting swiftwater & flood rescues, from engaging in high angle cliff rescues to providing SAR Incident Support (Management), state SAR staff coordinates the supplement to the local Sheriff's SAR response.

==== Fire & Rescue Division ====
The Cal OES Fire and Rescue Division, which coordinates the statewide response of fire mutual aid resources to all types of emergencies throughout the state, responded to more than 115 mutual aid incidents in 2004/05. The Fire & Rescue Division also houses the Hazardous Materials Section (Haz Mat). Haz Mat is responsible for the statewide implementation and local government oversight of hazardous material emergency management programs.

==== Recovery Division ====
The Recovery Division is responsible for managing disaster recovery and providing assistance to local governments and individuals impacted by disasters. The Division is proactive in promoting recovery preparedness and planning and actively seeks input from all stakeholders, including private non-profit organizations, private sector businesses, and the public.

=== Technology Operations ===
==== Information Technology Branch ====
The Information Technology Branch is made up of four Sections; Client Support, GIS (Geographic Information Systems), Networking and Programming. The IT branch takes care of all of the computer assets for Cal OES, from desktop assets to servers and the network infrastructure at region offices.

==== Telecommunications and Interoperability Branch ====
The California Office of Emergency Services (Cal OES) Telecommunications Section is responsible for Interoperable and Emergency Telecommunications in the state. To accomplish this task, Cal OES maintains a Warning Center and a State Operations Communications Center at its Mather Headquarters, and Region Communications Centers at each Administrative Region that provide communication resources at Cal OES Offices. The Cal OES Telecommunications Section also coordinates various statewide communications, communications assets and assists local governments in communications planning.
