= Certified Unified Program Agency =

Group of state agencies in California

Certified Unified Program Agencies, or CUPAs, are local agencies that are certified by the Secretary of the California Environmental Protection Agency (CalEPA) to implement the CalEPA Unified Program elements in the CUPA's jurisdiction. The CalEPA Unified Program consolidates, coordinates, and makes consistent the administrative requirements, permits, inspections, and enforcement activities of six environmental and emergency response programs in California. These six programs (and their corresponding state oversight agencies) are:

- Hazardous Materials Release Response Plans and Inventories (Business Plans) - California Governor's Office of Emergency Services (Cal OES)
- California Accidental Release Prevention (CalARP) Program - California Governor's Office of Emergency Services (Cal OES)
- Underground Storage Tank (UST) Program - California State Water Resources Control Board (SWRCB)
- Aboveground Petroleum Storage Act (APSA) - Office of the State Fire Marshal (CAL FIRE-OSFM)
- Hazardous Waste Generator and Onsite Hazardous Waste Treatment (tiered permitting) Programs - Department of Toxic Substances Control (DTSC)
- California Uniform Fire Code: Hazardous Material Management Plans and Hazardous Material Inventory Statements - Office of the State Fire Marshal (CAL FIRE-OSFM)

The mission of the Unified Program is to protect public health and safety, to restore and enhance environmental quality, and to sustain economic vitality through effective and efficient implementation of the Unified Program.

The Unified Program was established by California Senate Bill 1082 (Calderon) in 1993. Regulations were written to implement and enforce this law and the first CUPAs were certified in 1996. There are now 81 CUPAs and 24 participating agencies (PAs) throughout California. There have been as many as 83 CUPAs, but some have been decertified. CalEPA Regularly evaluates CUPAs for compliance with established statutory and regulatory standards. DTSC was also certified, effective January 1, 2005, to be the CUPA for Imperial and Trinity Counties.

Under Secretary of CalEPA Jared Blumenfeld, Assistant Secretary for Local Program Coordination and Emergency Response Jason Boetzer is head of the Unified Program (February 2020 to present). Previous Assistant Secretaries were Gregory Vlasek (2017-2019), James Bohon (2012-2017), and Don Johnson (1994 -2011).

CUPAs have statutory authority to require permits, inspect facilities, issue violations, and perform enforcement actions - including the authority to photograph any hazardous material or hazardous waste, container, container label, vehicle, waste treatment process, waste disposal site, or condition constituting a violation of law found during an inspection (California Health and Safety Code, Chapter 6.95, Section 25511(a) and Chapter 6.5, Section 25185(a)(5)).
