= California Department of Pesticide Regulation =

Agency overview
- Headquarters: Cal/EPA Building, Sacramento, California
- Employees: 440 staff
- Annual budget: $12.478 million (2023-2024)
- Agency executives: Karen Morrison, Director; Leia Bailey, Chief Deputy Director
- Parent agency: California Environmental Protection Agency
- Website: www.cdpr.ca.gov

The California Department of Pesticide Regulation, also known as DPR or CDPR, is one of six boards, departments and offices (BDOs) of the California Environmental Protection Agency (Cal/EPA).

The stated mission of DPR: "We protect human health and the environment by fostering sustainable pest management and regulating pesticides." DPR's work includes:

- pesticide product evaluation and registration;
- statewide licensing of commercial applicators, dealers, consultants and other pesticide professionals;
- evaluation of health impacts of pesticides through illness surveillance and risk assessment;
- environmental monitoring of air, water, and soil;
- field enforcement (with the assistance of 55 county agricultural commissioners) of laws regulating pesticide use;
- residue testing of fresh produce; and
- encouraging development and adoption of least-toxic pest management practices through incentives and grants.

DPR is regarded as the premier U.S. agency for pesticide regulation, the acknowledged peer of United States Environmental Protection Agency and Health Canada, and as an international authority in the field.

== History ==
California passed its first pesticide-related law in 1901, just three years after New York passed the nation's first pesticide law in 1898. The focus of California's first law was on preventing consumer fraud for sale of the most widely used insecticide, Paris green. Following the United States Congress passage of the first federal pesticide legislation, the Federal Insecticide and Rodenticide Act in 1910, California passed corresponding legislation, the State Insecticide and Fungicide Act of 1911. Similar to the federal act, at this time, the legislation was primarily concerned with mislabeling and adulteration of pesticides.

In the 1920s, the public began to raise concerns about pesticide residues in food as agricultural pesticide use, reports of illnesses, and seizures of fruit with high arsenic levels conducted by health officials increased. These changes prompted the state's pesticide regulatory program, which was at that time part of the California Department of Agriculture (also known as CDA and renamed as the California Department of Food and Agriculture in 1972), to begin analyzing fresh produce for pesticide residues and set allowable residue levels, or tolerances.

New pesticides prompted additional controls in the decades to follow. In 1925, there were about 1,700 pesticide products in California, which doubled to about 3,500 products in 1935, and grew to 7,000 pesticide products in 1945.

In 1969 and 1970, California passed landmark legislation that required pesticides to be thoroughly evaluated prior to being registered for use. Additionally, more authority was given to the department, allowing them to strengthen the study criteria for which pesticide manufacturers were required to submit and to make restrictions on how pesticides are used. Another major component of the legislation required the department to begin “an orderly program of continuous evaluation of pesticides already registered and eliminate from use those posing a danger to the agricultural or nonagricultural environment."

In 1972, CDFA was given the primary responsibility for ensuring “the safe use of pesticides and for safe working conditions for farmworkers, pest control applicators, and other persons handling, storing or applying pesticides, or working in and about pesticide-treated areas.” The department carried out the mandate by adopting regulations outlining rules on pesticide handling, pesticide storage, protective clothing, worker entry into treated fields, and field posting. At this time, the county agricultural commissioners (CACs) were given joint responsibility, along with CDFA, to enforce these regulations, and both the CDFA and the Department of Health were given “joint and mutual responsibility” for developing pesticide worker safety regulations. When Cal/EPA was formed in 1991, the aforementioned roles were transferred to DPR and Cal/EPA’s Office of Environmental Health Hazard Assessment (OEHHA), respectively.

=== 2012 to 2014 Accomplishments ===
DPR continues to complete risk assessments and risk reduction measures on chemicals that pose the highest risks to human health and the environment. Protection of workers remains paramount, and these activities are consistently improved and expanded. Recent accomplishments are described below.

From 2012 to 2014, DPR continued to advance the protection of California’s residents and environment, including:

- Restricting sales of certain types of rat poisons, known as second generation anticoagulant rodenticides (SGARs). SGARs are found in many animals that have eaten poisoned rodents, such as barn owls, coyotes, bobcats and the endangered San Joaquin kit fox. Not only does this restriction help protect these animals in California, but it also spurred changes at the national level. Following DPR's action, the pesticide manufacturer agreed to phase out their SGARs across, yielding a parallel success for the United States Environmental Protection Agency.
- Implementing surface water regulations for a certain class of chemical used in insecticides, called pyrethroids. Significant evidence from water quality researchers at CDPR and from across the globe have shown that these chemicals can get into urban creeks, storm drains and waterways and represent a major hazard to small aquatic organisms. The regulations restricted applications such that the risk of toxicity to these animals is greatly reduced. CDPR's monitoring efforts and regulatory changes prompted federal action. The United States Environmental Protection Agency made changes to the pyrethroid product labels first in 2009, and later revised in February 2013, to reduce the potential for these chemicals to enter surface waters and cause environmental harm.
- Dedicating more than $3 million in research for alternatives to field fumigants, gaseous pesticides injected into the soil prior to planting to control soil-borne pests such as insects, fungi, and weed seeds. Due to their gaseous state, fumigants can be transported from the soil where they are applied to the air, where they may adversely impact people's health anywhere from hours to days after they were applied. DPR has researched protections for those who work or live near fields treated with field fumigants, adding more safety measures to federal labels of and more evaluation protections. These efforts also include close work with strawberry growers, research partners, and other stakeholders to find practical and cost-effective alternatives to soil fumigants. Partnering with the strawberry industry is particularly important as California strawberry farmers represent one of the major users of field fumigants.

== Departmental Organization ==
DPR is organized into two divisions: Pesticide Programs and Administrative Services. The Pesticide Programs includes the following branches:

- Pesticide Registration
- Human Health Assessment
- Worker Health and Safety
- Pesticide Enforcement
- Environmental Monitoring
- Pest Management and Licensing

The Administrative Services Division includes:

- Fiscal, Audits and Business Services
- Human Resources Branch
- Information Technology

== Employee composition and funding ==
DPR's scientific responsibilities are fulfilled by a highly educated and trained professional staff of about 390 individuals. The staff include toxicologists, environmental specialists, statisticians, epidemiologists, community outreach workers, and industrial hygienists. Additionally, under DPR oversight, the CACs and approximately 250 of their biologists serve as the local enforcement agents for pesticide laws and regulations in California's 58 counties.

In fiscal year 2015-2016 DPR was budgeted for approximately $90.9 million, almost 98% of the funding coming from regulatory fees, primarily levied on pesticide sales at the point of first sale into the state, and penalties and the remaining 2% coming from federal funds from the United States Environmental Protection Agency and the United States Department of Agriculture.

== Grants ==
All DPR grant programs are related to Integrated Pest Management (IPM). The DPR cites the University of California Agriculture & Natural Resources definition of IPM as "an ecosystem-based strategy that focuses on long-term prevention of pests or their damage through a combination of techniques such as biological control, habitat manipulation, modification of cultural practices, and use of resistant varieties." This term encompasses a wide variety of both research and implementation projects that apply for grants from the DPR. Due to the broad nature of IPM, there are two separate grant programs, the Alliance and Research Grant Programs, each with different funding criteria. The Pest Management Advisory Committee is a 30-member group which meets four times a year to determine which applicant projects to fund.

=== Alliance Grants Program ===
This program's focus is expanding and improving existing IPM practices throughout California. Two common features in projects that receive Alliance Grants are the reduction of dangers to the public and the environment, and education and outreach programs related to their proposed actions. These projects are often applicable to a variety of circumstances, and can provide the groundwork for future projects. This program has funded 32 separate projects with a total grant amount of $5.6 million, between 2007 and 2022, with two to three projects funded every year. In 2022, the DPR announced an expansion of the Alliance Grant budget from $400,000 divided amongst all awardees to up to $1.8 million per awardee.

=== Research grants ===
This program is focused on the research and development of new pesticide use practices, to advance modern IPM systems. Research Grants are often used to gain a better understanding of an ecosystem, or to investigate the impacts of a certain IPM practice. When successful, these projects can guide future policy design, as well as future pesticide production. Between 2013 and 2022, this program has provided funding to 31 projects with a total grant amount of $6.8 million, with up to five projects funded every year. In 2022, the DPR announced an expansion to the Research Grant budget from $1.1 million divided amongst all awardees to up to $3.75 million per awardee.

== See also ==
- Angelita C. et al. v. California Department of Pesticide Regulation
