= California Environmental Protection Agency =

State government agency. California, U.S.

- Logo

Agency overview
- Formed: July 17, 1991; 35 years ago
- Headquarters: Cal/EPA Building, Sacramento, California
- Employees: 8,104 (2024)
- Annual budget: US$5.632 billion (2024-25)
- Agency executives: Yana Garcia, Secretary; Serena McIlwain, Undersecretary
- Child agencies: California Air Resources Board; California Department of Toxic Substances Control; California Department of Pesticide Regulation; California Office of Environmental Health Hazard Assessment; California State Water Resources Control Board; California Department of Resources Recycling and Recovery
- Website: calepa.ca.gov

The California Environmental Protection Agency (CalEPA) is a state cabinet-level agency within the government of California. The mission of CalEPA is to restore, protect and enhance the environment, to ensure public health, environmental quality and economic vitality.

The current Secretary for Environmental Protection (Secretary of CalEPA) is Yana Garcia, (formerly Jared Blumenfeld), and is a member of Governor Gavin Newsom's cabinet. The Office of the Secretary heads CalEPA and is responsible for overseeing and coordinating the activities of one office, two boards, and three departments dedicated to improving California's environment.

The Secretary of CalEPA is also directly responsible for coordinating the administration of the Unified Program and certifying Unified Program Agencies. The CalEPA Unified Program coordinates, and makes consistent the administrative requirements, permits, inspections, and enforcement activities of six environmental and emergency response programs. The state agencies responsible for these programs set the standards for their program while local governments implement the standards. To date, there are 83 Certified Unified Program Agencies (CUPAs), who are accountable for carrying out responsibilities previously handled by approximately 1,300 different state and local agencies.

== History ==
CalEPA was created by Governor Pete Wilson by Executive Order W-5-91 in 1991, following on a "Big Green" initiative Wilson proposed during the 1990 state gubernatorial elections, promising a cabinet-level agency to oversee state environmental regulations and research. Following inter-agency reorganizations led by the governor with review by both houses of the California State Legislature, the agency became a cabinet department on July 17, 1991. As of 2019, the statutory creation of the agency is in Government Code section 12800.

CalEPA, and its departmental California Air Resources Board, were one of the key supporters of the Global Warming Solutions Act of 2006, making the state the first in the United States to cap all greenhouse gas emissions from major industries.

In June 2008, CalEPA announced that new global warming performance labels would be placed on all new cars effective on January 1, 2009. The stickers will provide two scores: a smog score and a global warming score with a grade from 1 to 10, where the higher the grade, the more environmentally friendly the vehicle.

== Executive Management ==
- Yana Garcia, Secretary for Environmental Protection (Secretary of CalEPA) – appointed by Governor Gavin Newsom. Started role in September 2022. Formerly Jared Blumenfeld, Secretary for Environmental Protection (Secretary of CalEPA) – appointed by Governor Gavin Newsom in January 2019. Retired 2022.
- Serena McIlwain, Undersecretary for Environmental Protection (Undersecretary of CalEPA)

Deputy/Assistant Secretaries

- Alexa Kleysteuber, Deputy Secretary for Border and Intergovernmental Relations
- Alex Barnum, Deputy Secretary for Communications and External Affairs
- Christiana Tiedemann, Deputy Secretary for Law Enforcement and Counsel
- Ashley Conrad-Saydah, Deputy Secretary for Climate Policy
- Grant Cope, Deputy Secretary for Environmental Policy
- Christine Hironaka, Deputy Secretary for Legislative Affairs
- Gina Solomon, Deputy Secretary for Science and Health
- Jason Boetzer, Assistant Secretary for Local Program Coordination and Emergency Response
- Eric Jarvis, Assistant Secretary for Fiscal & Administrative Programs
- Christie Vosburg, Assistant General Counsel for Enforcement
- Yana Garcia, Assistant Secretary for Environmental Justice and Tribal Affairs
- Alejandro Rodarte, Assistant Secretary for Border Affairs
- John Blue, Manager of Climate Programs
- Sergio Gutierrez, Agency Chief Information Officer

== Boards, Departments, and Offices ==
- Office of the Secretary
- California Air Resources Board (CARB)
- Department of Pesticide Regulation (DPR)
- California Department of Resources, Recycling and Recovery (CalRecycle)
- Department of Toxic Substances Control (DTSC)
- Office of Environmental Health Hazard Assessment (OEHHA)
- State Water Resources Control Board (SWRCB)

The California Integrated Waste Management Board, that focused on recycling and waste reduction, ceased in 2010. It was succeeded by the California Department of Resources Recycling and Recovery—CalRecycle, also under CalEPA.

== See also ==
- California Department of Conservation
- Climate change in California
- Environment of California
- Environmentalism
- Kyoto Protocol
- Pollution in California
- United States Environmental Protection Agency
