= Computational toxicology =

Computational toxicology is a multidisciplinary field and area of study, which is employed in the early stages of drug discovery and development to predict the safety and potential toxicity of drug candidates. It integrates in silico methods, or computer-based models, with in vivo, or animal, and in vitro, or cell-based, approaches to achieve a more efficient, reliable, and ethically responsible toxicity evaluation process. Key aspects of computational toxicology include the following: early safety prediction, mechanism-oriented modeling, integration with experimental approaches, and structure-based algorithms. Sean Ekins is a forerunner in the field of computational toxicology among other fields.

== Historical development ==
The origins of computational toxicology trace back to the 1960s and 1970s when early quantitative structure–activity relationship, or QSAR, models were developed. These models aimed to predict the biological activity of chemicals based on their molecular structures. Advances in computational power during this period allowed for increasingly sophisticated simulations and analyses, laying the groundwork for modern computational approaches. The 1980s and 1990s saw the expansion of the field with the advent of molecular docking, cheminformatics, and bioinformatics tools. The rise of high-throughput screening technologies provided vast datasets, which fueled the need for computational methods to manage and interpret complex toxicological data.

In the early 21st century, the establishment of initiatives such as the U.S. Environmental Protection Agency's, or EPA's, ToxCast program marked a significant milestone. ToxCast aimed to integrate computational and experimental data to improve toxicity prediction and reduce reliance on animal testing. During this time, advances in machine learning and artificial intelligence further transformed the field, enabling the analysis of large-scale datasets and the development of predictive models with greater accuracy. Today, computational toxicology continues to evolve, driven by innovations in omics technologies, big data analytics, and regulatory science. It plays a crucial role in risk assessment, drug development, and environmental protection, offering faster and more ethical alternatives to traditional toxicological testing.
