= California Office of Environmental Health Hazard Assessment =

American specialized government agency

Office of Environmental Health Hazard Assessment
- OEHHA's logo

Agency overview
- Headquarters: CalEPA Building, Sacramento, California; United States
- Employees: 161 positions
- Annual budget: $34.2 mil total; $10.7 mil general fund
- Agency executive: Kris Thayer, PhD, Director
- Parent agency: California Environmental Protection Agency
- Website: http://www.oehha.ca.gov

The Office of Environmental Health Hazard Assessment, commonly referred to as OEHHA (pronounced oh-EEE-ha), is a specialized department within the California Environmental Protection Agency (CalEPA). OEHHA is the lead state agency for the assessment of health risks posed by environmental contaminants. OEHHA evaluates harmful chemicals and other environmental hazards, such as extreme heat, to understand interconnected environmental health burdens faced by individuals and communities in California. This allows OEHHA to play a critical and unique role—providing independent analyses to inform science-based decision making.

As CalEPA’s scientific adviser, OEHHA works within CalEPA and across state government, with other state and federal agencies, businesses, community-based organizations, and communities and Native American Tribes across California to develop actionable science that protects public health, especially for those facing multiple environmental hazards.

OEHHA's current director is Dr. Kris Thayer, who was appointed by Governor Gavin Newsom on April 29, 2025. Previously, Dr. Lauren Zeise directed OEHHA from 2015 until 2024.

== Goals and responsibilities ==
=== OEHHA's goals ===
- Improve the quality of the public's health and the environment.
- Advance the science for the evaluation of risks posed to the public health and environment, and provide risk assessment leadership for the State of California.
- Provide high quality information about environmental health hazards to the public.

=== OEHHA's programs ===
Health risks posed by chemicals

- Healthy Air: The Air Toxics Hot Spots program sets health guidance values for air pollutants and reviews facility risk assessments to protect nearby communities.
- Safe Drinking Water: OEHHA sets Public Health Goals for contaminants in drinking water; the California State Water Resources Control Board uses these goals to establish enforceable limits as close as feasible.
- Right to Know: Proposition 65 requires businesses to warn Californians about exposures to chemicals listed by the state.
- Children’s Environmental Health: The Children’s Environmental Health Center supports CalEPA, educates health professionals and the public, and promotes policies that protect children.
- Synthetic Food Dyes: A 2021 OEHHA report linked synthetic food dyes to neurobehavioral effects in children.
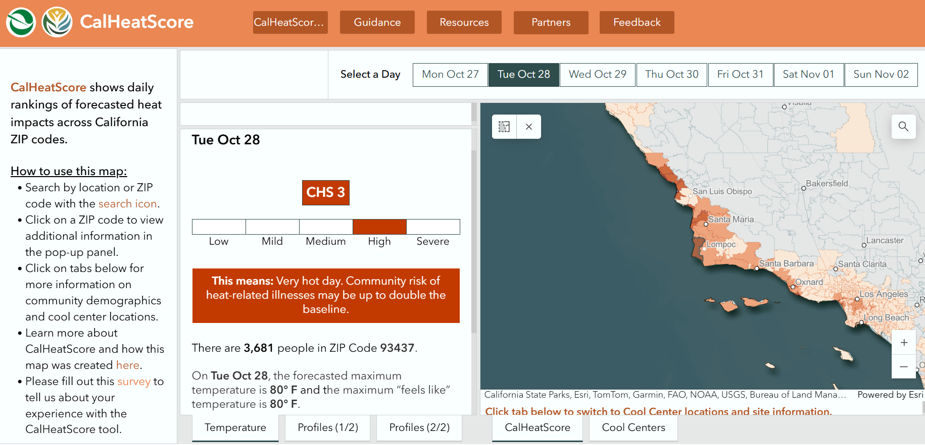
  CalHeatScore dashboard on Tuesday, October 28, 2025. Some parts of the central coast had a CalHeatScore of 3, reflecting a community risk of health-related illness up to double the baseline.
- Innovative Toxicology: There are tens of thousands of chemicals in commerce, and OEHHA is developing new ways to identify hidden hazards through computational toxicology and other emerging approaches.

Climate Change Impacts

- Tracking Climate Change Impacts: The Indicators of Climate Change report uses data-driven measures to show how climate change is affecting California’s environment and people, including impacts on Native American Tribes described in their own words.
- Climate Change and Health Research: This program studies the health impacts of climate change and the equity implications of climate policies.

Tools for public health and health education

- Heat Wave Ranking: CalHeatScore provides easy-to-understand heat risk alerts to help Californians prepare for extreme heat, reduce heat-related illness, and save lives.
- Cumulative Impacts Tool: CalEnviroScreen maps communities most burdened by pollution and most vulnerable to its effects.
- Fish Advisories: OEHHA issues guidelines on how often fish from California waters can be safely eaten, with over 150 advisories available.

Fish Advisory for California river, streams, and creeks without site-specific advice. This poster show how much of various species can be safely eaten each week. More servings may be eaten for fish with lower levels of chemicals.

- Pesticide Safety: OEHHA provides outreach and education, monitors pesticide illness, evaluates toxicity and exposure data, and develops worker health and safety regulations.

Tracking chemical exposures

- Biomonitoring: Biomonitoring California measures chemicals in people’s bodies to better understand exposures to toxic substances.

Emergency response and expert consultation

- Oil Spill Response: After oil spills, OEHHA evaluates fish contamination risks and advises whether fisheries should be opened or closed.
- Harmful Algal Blooms: OEHHA assesses toxin levels in marine fish and shellfish and investigates reported illnesses from freshwater blooms to guide public health actions.
- Contaminated Site Clean-Up: OEHHA supports cleanup of sites such as dry cleaners and former oil and gas operations through risk assessment and toxicological consultation.

Information about additional program areas is available on OEHHA’s website.

== Results and Applications of OEHHA's science ==
Some of OEHHA's most recognizable contributions to public and environmental health are:

- The California Communities Environmental Health Screening Tool (CalEnviroScreen) has helped invest over 6 billion dollars in California communities facing pollution and poverty.
- OEHHA's first-of-its-kind extreme heat early warning tool, CalHeatScore, was launched in 2025 and is used by individuals and leaders to prepare for high temperatures.
- OEHHA’s published a report linking synthetic food dyes to hyperactivity and other neurobehavioral effects in children, which has been followed by efforts banning or limiting synthetic food dyes in California, other states, and at the federal level.
- OEHHA studies have shown associations between heat and a variety of adverse health outcomes, including deaths, adverse birth outcomes (i.e. preterm delivery, low birth weight, and still birth), and increased emergency room visits and hospitalizations for cardiovascular, respiratory, mental health, kidney, liver, and urinary system outcomes. OEHHA’s studies have also identified populations that may be more vulnerable to heat-related deaths and illnesses, including older adults, pregnant people, infants and children, and people of color.
- OEHHA's groundbreaking work that showed that chromium in drinking water causes cancer; this issue was publicized in the movie Erin Brockovich.
- OEHHA's research was critical in passing legislation to ban toxic phthalates from children's toys in California.
- OEHHA was the first agency to identify second-hand tobacco smoke as a causal factor in breast cancer in young women.
- California's ban on two widely used toxic flame retardants was supported by OEHHA's research. The California ban led to these chemicals being phased out in the United States.
- OEHHA was the first government agency to establish that diesel exhaust causes cancer and induces asthma in children. OEHHA's work has led to stringent new controls on this widespread pollutant.
- With OEHHA's support, the California Attorney General led the way in removing lead from consumer product' including venetian blinds, children's toys and jewelry, tableware, water faucets and ceramics. Other California success stories include reducing the use of toxic pesticides in flea collars and no-pest strips and removal of a cancer-causing chemical from office supplies.
- OEHHA's research contributed to the phase-out of a toxic gasoline additive (MTBE) that contaminated groundwater throughout California.
- California was the first state to regulate a rocket fuel component which widely contaminates drinking water and produce including lettuce. OEHHA's research provided the basis for this drinking water standard.

== Organizational structure ==
OEHHA's scientific responsibilities are fulfilled by a highly educated and trained professional staff of about 160 individuals This includes about 130 scientific and public health positions. The staff include toxicologists, epidemiologists, biostatisticians and physicians; many have international reputations in their scientific fields.

OEHHA has following main divisions and offices:

- Division of Scientific Programs
- Administrative Services Division
- Office of External and Legislative Affairs
- Office of the Chief Council
- Office Environmental Health Education, Community Engagement, and Cumulative Impacts

The Division of Scientific Programs is composed of four scientific branches:

- Air and Site Assessment and Climate Indicators Branch
- Community and Environmental Epidemiology Research Branch
- Pesticide and Environmental Toxicology Branch
- Reproductive and Cancer Hazard Assessment Branch

== History ==
OEHHA was established in its current form by Governor Pete Wilson on July 17, 1991 with the creation of CalEPA. OEHHA originated in the 1950s for air epidemiology in the California Department of Public Health and developed over time with increased public awareness of the environment. OEHHA is the smallest of the six boards, departments and offices within CalEPA.

A budget proposal in May 2009 would have eliminated OEHHA and transferred its functions to other departments to address budget shortfalls. However, OEHHA was preserved as a separate office to keep its scientific assessments independent from policy decisions made by other departments.
