= California Labor and Workforce Development Agency =

Labor and Workforce Development Agency

Agency overview
- Formed: January 1, 2003
- Jurisdiction: California
- Headquarters: 800 Capitol Mall, Sacramento, California; 38°34′38.26″N 121°29′50.16″W
- Employees: 14,000
- Annual budget: US$ 26.4 billion (2011)
- Agency executive: Stewart Knox, Secretary
- Website: labor.ca.gov

The California Labor and Workforce Development Agency (LWDA) is a cabinet-level agency of the government of California. The agency coordinates workforce programs by overseeing seven major departments dealing with benefit administration, enforcement of California labor laws, appellate functions related to employee benefits, workforce development, tax collection, economic development activities. It was conceived by the 37th governor Gray Davis and was formally created by S.B. 1236 in 2002.

== Organization ==
The agency oversees multiple departments and programs:

- California Department of Industrial Relations enforces labor laws through DLSE, workplace safety through Cal/OSHA, and workers’ compensation programs through DWC and WCAB.
- California Agricultural Labor Relations Board administers the California Agricultural Labor Relations Act, which establishes collective bargaining for farmworkers.
- Employment Development Department administers unemployment insurance (UI), disability insurance (DI), and paid family leave (PFL) programs.
- Unemployment Insurance Appeals Board is a quasi-judicial administrative court which hears appeals from determinations on unemployment insurance (UI) claims and taxes by the Employment Development Department.
- California Public Employment Relations Board
- California Workforce Development Board
- Employment Training Panel

== See also ==
- United States Department of Labor
