= Career ladder =

Metaphor for job promotion

A career ladder or corporate ladder is a metaphor for job promotion. In business and human resources management, the career ladder typically describes the progression from entry level positions to higher levels of pay, skill, responsibility, or authority. This metaphor is spatially oriented, and frequently used to denote upward mobility within a stratified promotion model. Because the career ladder does not provide for lateral movement, it is assumed to be a singular track with the greatest benefits at the top.

Job training programs, funded by public sector workforce funds and private foundations, have made attempts to increase the number of career ladders in various sectors, including health care, finance, and hospitality. The Annie E. Casey Foundation, Rockefeller Foundation, and several other foundations funded a series of studies and pilot projects in the early 2000s to expand and build a network of career ladders and mobility for workers through skills training and the use of workforce intermediaries, as described by Robert Giloth.

The California state Employment Development Department (EDD) also in the early 2000s funded a series of career ladder programs, spearheaded by then director Michael Bernick. The programs sought to improve mobility and income of low wage workforces in California. EDD worked with several industry associations in long-term care, hospitality, and even farm work. The career ladder programs had very mixed results.

== Contrast to "bridge" ==
In this usage, the spatial metaphor of "bridge" would describe lateral promotion or entry. A bridged system would more closely resemble a fraternal organizational style, where members of the family are directly offered highly ranked positions. Another example is celebrities being directly elected among the public to political positions.

== Dual career ladder ==
This extension to the traditional career ladder allows employees to be promoted along either a supervisory or technical track. Dual career ladder programs are common in the engineering, scientific and medical industries where valuable employees have particular technical skills but may not be inclined to pursue a management career path. When properly managed, these programs can help companies retain top talent by offering extended career opportunities while allowing employees to remain in their chosen careers and continue to receive salary increases.

Example dual career ladder used in software engineering
Level	Technical Ladder	Management Ladder
1	Software Engineer	-
2	Senior Engineer	-
3	Staff Engineer	Manager
4	Senior Staff Engineer	Director
5	Principal Engineer	Senior director
6	Distinguished Fellow/Engineer	
7		
8	-	

== Broken rung ==
In 2023, Forbes writer and author Christine Michel Carter researched the long-term career impact of women not being promoted from entry-level to management positions. Carter said the long-term career impact of missing the promotion opportunity is the "broken rung", a metaphor referencing a missed rung or step on a ladder. Further McKinsey research has argued that the "broken rung" is the biggest obstacle keeping women from advancing in their careers.

== Gift exchange ==
Nobel laureate George Akerlof argued that promotion ladder provides a mechanism whereby a gift exchange occurs between an employer and his workers: a firm pays its workers salaries which are higher than the market-clearing level, and the workers increase levels of productivity for their company. This is especially true for a bureaucracy where officials are loyal to the operation of their firm and exercise an impersonal discipline in return for their promotion ladder.
