= Real party in interest =

In law, the real party in interest is the party who possesses the substantive right being asserted and has a legal right to enforce the claim (under applicable substantive law). The "real party in interest" must also sue in his own name. In many situations, the real party in interest will be the parties themselves (i.e., plaintiff and defendant).

== Applications ==
In California law, when a case goes up on writ of mandate (California's version of mandamus), the appellant goes first in the case caption on appeal as the petitioner, and the superior court becomes the respondent. The actual opponent is listed below those names as the "real party in interest." This is how several famous California cases like Burnham v. Superior Court of California (1990) ended up with such unusual names.

In Michigan law, the real-party-in-interest rule recognizes that litigation should be begun only by a party having an interest that will [ensure] sincere and vigorous advocacy.

When a trustee is a party to a lawsuit, the real party in interest is the beneficiary of the trust. In the United States, Rule 17 of the Federal Rules of Civil Procedure expressly provides that trustees are the real parties in interest when it is necessary to sue on behalf of the estate. A beneficiary may sue under these circumstances only when the trustee refuses or neglects to bring suit.

When funds belonging to a party are held on account, but not necessarily in trust, by a financial institution (e.g., a bank checking account is garnished by a third party who claims a valid unpaid debt), the bank is typically sued as nominal defendant. Of course, the real party in interest is the owner of the account, who has an absolute right to intervene and protect his assets.

== See also ==
- Beneficial owner
