= California Alcoholic Beverage Control Appeals Board =

Alcoholic Beverage Control Appeals Board
- Established: January 1, 1955
- Location: Various
- Composition method: Nominated by Governor, confirmed by Senate
- Authorised by: California Constitution art. XX § 22
- Appeals to: Superior Court
- Appeals from: Department of Alcoholic Beverage Control
- Number of positions: 3 board members, several staff positions
- Website: abcab.ca.gov

Susan Bonilla
- Currently: Chair

Executive Officer
- Currently: Taryn Kinney

The California Alcoholic Beverage Control Appeals Board is a quasi-judicial administrative court and constitutional office in the U.S. state of California. The Board hears appeals from final decisions of the Department of Alcoholic Beverage Control regarding the issuance of alcoholic beverage licenses, license conditions, protests against the issuance of licenses, and violations of law by licensees. The Board was founded in 1954 together with the department; as required by the California Constitution, its members are selected by the Governor of California and confirmed by the California State Senate by a majority vote, and each newly appointed member must be from a different county than the other two at the time of their initial appointment.

In 2012, the Board was placed under the Business, Consumer Services, and Housing Agency by operation of Senate Bill 1039, effective July 1, 2013.

Unlike many administrative courts, such as the California Unemployment Insurance Appeals Board, the Board determines appeals solely based on the department's records and briefs, and does not accept new evidence on appeal. As such, all evidence must have been properly presented to the department in order to be considered by the Board.
