= Cervero =

Cervero is a surname. Notable people with the surname include:

- Diego Cervero (born 1983), Spanish footballer
- Robert Cervero (born 1951), American academic
- Nestor Cerveró (born 1951), Brazilian chemical engineer
