= Michael S. Bernick =

American lawyer

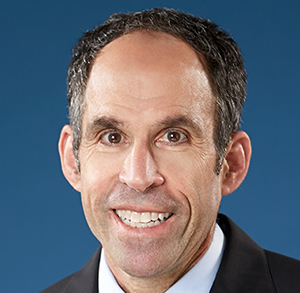
- Michael Bernick in 2017
- Born: October 1, 1952 (age 73)
- Education: Harvard University (B.A., 1974); Oxford University (Balliol College, B. Phil. 1976); University of California, Berkeley (J.D. 1979)
- Known for: Director of California's Employment Development Department; Author of a series of books and articles on employment and job training written from the practitioner experience Director of the BART transit system, early transit village proponent
- Website: www.duanemorris.com/attorneys/michaelsbernick.html

Michael S. Bernick (born October 1, 1952) is an American lawyer. He served as Director of California's labor department, the Employment Development Department (EDD), from 1999 to 2004, and has been involved in developing and implementing job training and employment projects on the state and local levels for over four decades. He is the author of a series of articles and books drawing on these projects and centered on achieving fuller employment and expanding the middle class. He continues to be active today in the employment field as counsel with Duane Morris LLP, and as the long-time research director of the California Workforce Association (CWA), and Fellow with the Milken institute and Burning Glass Institute.

In a series of articles and books written during the 1980s and 1990s, based on experiences at the San Francisco Renaissance Center and other community-based organizations, he argues against the then-expanding social welfare system. He sets out alternative jobs-based strategies and ownership-based strategies, including ones of rapid job placement with supports, inner city entrepreneurship and market-based training and job ladders.

Since the early 2000s, his projects, first at the EDD and then through the CWA, continue to address workers who have greatest difficulty finding steady work. Job Training That Gets Results (2006) identifies elements of effective job training programs, and roles for affinity groups and other mutual support groups outside of government. Other projects from this period test strategies for improving the mobility of lower wage workforces and increasing investment in these workforces.

The employment of adults with autism and other neurodivergent conditions is the subject of multiple projects, as well as two books in the 2000s. The Autism Job Club (2015) discusses the emerging structured and intentional neurodiversity hiring programs within major firms, as well as the new sub-sector of neurodiversity workforce intermediaries. The Autism Full Employment Act (2021), discusses autism employment initiatives as the American economy rebuilds post-pandemic.

== Early life and education ==
Bernick grew up in Los Angeles through Fairfax High School. A marathon runner in the 1960s, he was active in the long-distance running subculture of Southern California at that time. He attended Harvard University (B.A. 1974), Oxford University (Balliol College, B. Phil. 1976) and the University of California, Berkeley Law School (J.D. 1979). He spent his final year of law school in Washington DC researching and writing a monograph on judge J. Skelly Wright.

== Career in the employment field ==
=== 1980s and 1990s, Community Job Training ===
After graduating from law school in 1979, Bernick spent much of the next seven years in community job training, first with Arriba Juntos and then as the founding executive director of the San Francisco Renaissance Center. The Renaissance Center developed literacy and vocational training classes, an early welfare to work program, and business ventures in cable assembly, carpet cleaning bike messenger services and a convenience store. Renaissance established an Entrepreneurship Center and micro loan fund, that have continued to the present.

In his writings, Bernick was an early proponent of what became welfare reform under President Bill Clinton, and of market-based approaches to vocational and literacy training. He argued for strategies of inner city entrepreneurship and inner city loan funds. The Dreams of Jobs (1982) was a first book, compiling research on the job training programs in San Francisco from 1960 to 1980. It was followed a few years later by Urban Illusions (1986), on the job training and anti-poverty challenges of the 1980s.

In 1986 Bernick went into private law practice with the law firm of Arnelle and Hastie. He continued in the workforce field as a board member of several community job training agencies, including the Ella Hill Hutch Community Center, Friends Outside and the Mission Reading Clinic.

=== 1994-2004, Employment Development Department ===
Bernick was appointed EDD director in March 1999 by Governor Gray Davis, and served until February 2004, several months after Governor Davis was recalled. During this period, unemployment in California reached thirty year lows, only to rise with the dot.com bust in the early 2000s. Bernick’s 2006 book, Job Training that Gets Results traces employment shifts in California, as well as emerging employment trends and lessons of the previous 50 years of training programs. Other writing for the Milken Institute focused on job ladders for low-wage workers and employment for workers with disabilities.

=== 2004-2024, California Workforce Association ===
Following his time at EDD, Bernick returned to law in San Francisco at Sedgwick LLP (2004-2017) and later at Duane Morris LLP (2018–present). He also joined the Milken Institute in 2004 as a fellow in employment policy, and became research director of CWA in 2009.

At CWA, Bernick helped develop and oversee projects testing a range of employment strategies: re-employment for the long-term unemployed, apprenticeships in non-traditional fields, internet job search and placement tools, and public service employment for adults with developmental disabilities.He joined with La Cooperativa, Growth Sector, Transmosis, and other workforce intermediaries in worker retraining for growth occupations in engineering, health care, trucking, and information technology.

His writing has chronicled the evolution of California industries and jobs and examined various employment dynamics. In twice-monthly California employment postings dating from early 2009 for the website Fox & Hounds, he chronicled the large scale job losses in California employment during the Great Recession and the subsequent employment recovery. In essays for Zocalo Public Square and other journals, he examined the breakdown in full-time employment and rise of alternative forms of employment, the projected growth of the "non-knowledge economy," the evolving forms of job placement, policies that restrict job creation, crowdfunding and anti-poverty impacts, and why most approaches today to wage inequality are ineffective. Since 2016, Bernick has been a regular contributor to Forbes on employment law and policies. Underlying the projects and writings are themes of expanding the middle class and achieving this expansion through a jobs strategy. He argues against movements on the left toward guaranteed income and benefits expansions, and proposes approaches that emphasize the structure and confidence that only a job brings. He also argues for "work first" approaches that emphasize placement into jobs, with training and advancement to follow.

=== The Autism Job Club ===
Bernick has been involved since 2004 in a series of employment initiatives involving adults on the autistic spectrum. He was part of launching the neurodiversity programs at California State University East Bay and at William Jessup University. He helped develop The Specialists Guild and the Aascend Job Club, a vehicle for mutual support among job seekers.

He has written two books on employment for adults with developmental and neurological differences. The Autism Job Club: The Neurodiverse Workforce in the New Normal of Employment (2015) sets out the individual and collective strategies for increasing employment among adults on the autistic spectrum. The Autism Full Employment Act (2021) discusses the next stages of jobs for adults with autism, ADHD, and other learning and mental health differences.

== BART Board and the Transit Village Movement ==
In 1988 Bernick was elected to the board of directors of the Bay Area Rapid Transit (BART) rail system. He soon noted the lack of land development in the Bay Area that was linked to the rail system. With UC Berkeley Professor Robert Cervero, he established a research center at UC Berkeley focused on the link between land use and transit, and together they published a series of articles leading to their 1996 book, Transit Villages in the 21st Century. The book helped to develop and popularize the transit village concept. Bernick served on the BART Board for eight years.

== Controversy ==
Veteran Bay Area investigative reporters Matier & Ross wrote in the San Francisco Chronicle in June 1996 that BART Director Michael Bernick "accepted campaign contributions from BART contractors". Moreover, "excerpts of a federal wire tap [released in connection with indictments] showed that Bernick regularly talked to contractors about extending a deal for them at the same time they were helping to raise campaign contributions for his re-election."

== JROTC in the public schools ==
In early 2006, the San Francisco School Board voted to eliminate the Junior Reserve Officers’ Training Corps (JROTC) in the San Francisco Public Schools. Bernick and a number of other parents immediately formed a pro-JROTC committee to reverse the decision and keep the JROTC program. The committee gathered 13,800 signatures and placed a measure on the November 2006 ballot. Given the left politics of San Francisco, the measure was not expected to pass. Instead, it passed with over 55% of the vote. JROTC was restored, and has even grown in size in the years since.

== California State Library Collection of Writings ==
In October 2015, the California State Library opened a collection of Bernick's writings and papers. The Collection includes over 200 articles by Bernick covering 35 years, as well as background material on his six books and two additional book projects-The Jobs Perplex and Real Work. The main section of the collection focuses on job training and employment strategies. The collection also includes sections on the transit village movement in California, autism employment and inclusion, California government, and the long-distance running sub-culture of Southern California.
