= California Department of Tax and Fee Administration =

State government department in California, US

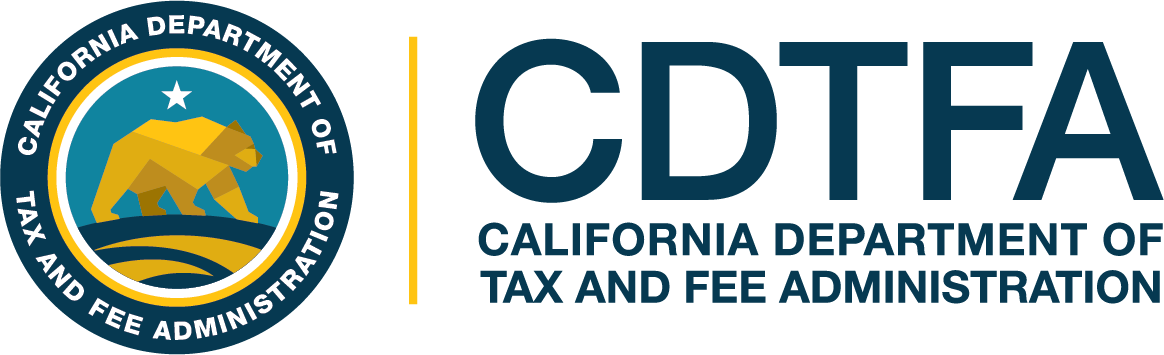

Agency overview
- Formed: January 1, 2018
- Preceding agency: California Board of Equalization
- Jurisdiction: Statewide jurisdiction over sales, use and special taxes
- Headquarters: Sacramento, California; 38.544344966644864°N 121.40727108202177°W
- Agency executive: Nicolas Maduros, Director (as of 2021)
- Parent agency: California Government Operations Agency
- Website: cdtfa.ca.gov

The California Department of Tax and Fee Administration (CDTFA) is the public agency charged with assessing and collecting sales and use taxes, as well as a variety of excise fees and taxes, for the U.S. state of California. The department has several other ancillary functions, such as ensuring that sellers comply with permit requirements. The department was formed on January 1, 2018, by the Taxpayer Transparency and Fairness Act of 2017, which reduced the California State Board of Equalization to its constitutional functions of supervising county tax assessors and assessing certain specified types of property.

The department is one of the State of California's three primary state taxing agencies, collecting over 70 billion dollars annually in revenue for the State. The other two are the Employment Development Department and the Franchise Tax Board.

== History ==
The collection of almost all state sales taxes and special fees, prior to the formation of the Administration, was handled by the California State Board of Equalization, a constitutional body composed of constitutional offices; despite almost a century of attempts to reform the Board, owing to various corruption-related concerns, these efforts were not successful for most of its history. However, in 2017, a Department of Finance audit revealed missing funds and signs of nepotism by the Board's members, including the misuse of state time by requiring Compliance Representatives and other administrative workers to do menial work for promotional events. In June 2017, the California Department of Justice began a criminal investigation into the members of the Board.

On June 27, 2017, the California State Legislature stripped the Board of most of its powers; its collection and assessment functions were transferred to the Administration, while its appeal powers were transferred to the California Office of Tax Appeals. This constituted the shift of 90% of workers into the new departments.

== Appeals ==
Appeals from tax and fee decisions made by the department go to the Office of Tax Appeals, as with the Franchise Tax Board. This excludes appeals from matters concerning the Alcoholic Beverage Tax and the Tax on Insurers, as the department is only contracted to collect those taxes on behalf of the Board of Equalization.

== Tax and fee programs ==
The department handles the vast majority of California's sales, use and excise tax assessment, auditing and collection. It also collects the 1.25% Bradley-Burns Uniform Local Sales and Use Tax and various 'district taxes'.

- Sales & use tax
- Alcoholic Beverage Tax (contracted to administer on behalf of the Board of Equalization)
- California Tire Fee
- Cannabis Taxes
- Childhood Lead Poisoning Prevention Fee
- Cigarette & Tobacco Products Licensing Program
- Cigarette & Tobacco Products Tax
- Cigarette Tax Stamp Program
- Covered Electronic Waste Recycling Fee
- Diesel Fuel Tax
- Emergency Telephone Users (911) Surcharge and Local Charges
- Energy Resources (Electrical) Surcharge
- Fire Prevention Fee
- Hazardous Waste Disposal Fee
- Hazardous Waste Environmental Fee
- Hazardous Waste Facility Fee
- Hazardous Waste Generator Fee
- Integrated Waste Management Fee (Solid Waste & Wood Waste)
- International Fuel Tax Agreement (IFTA) and Interstate User Diesel Fuel Tax
- Interstate User Diesel Fuel Tax
- Jet Fuel Tax
- Lead-Acid Battery Fees
- Lumber Products Assessment
- Marine Invasive Species (Ballast Water) Fee
- Motor Vehicle Fuel Tax
- Natural Gas Surcharge
- Occupational Lead Poisoning Prevention Fee
- Oil Spill Response, Prevention, and Administration Fees
- Tax on Insurers (contracted to administer on behalf of the Board of Equalization)
- Timber Yield Tax
- Underground Storage Tank Maintenance Fee
- Use Fuel Tax
- Water Rights Fee

=== Former programs ===
- Hazardous Waste Activity Fee (transferred to the California Department of Toxic Substance Control effective September 13, 2016)

== See also ==
- Franchise Tax Board
- Employment Development Department
- California Board of Equalization
