= Transit village =

Urban planning prioritising transit and pedestrians

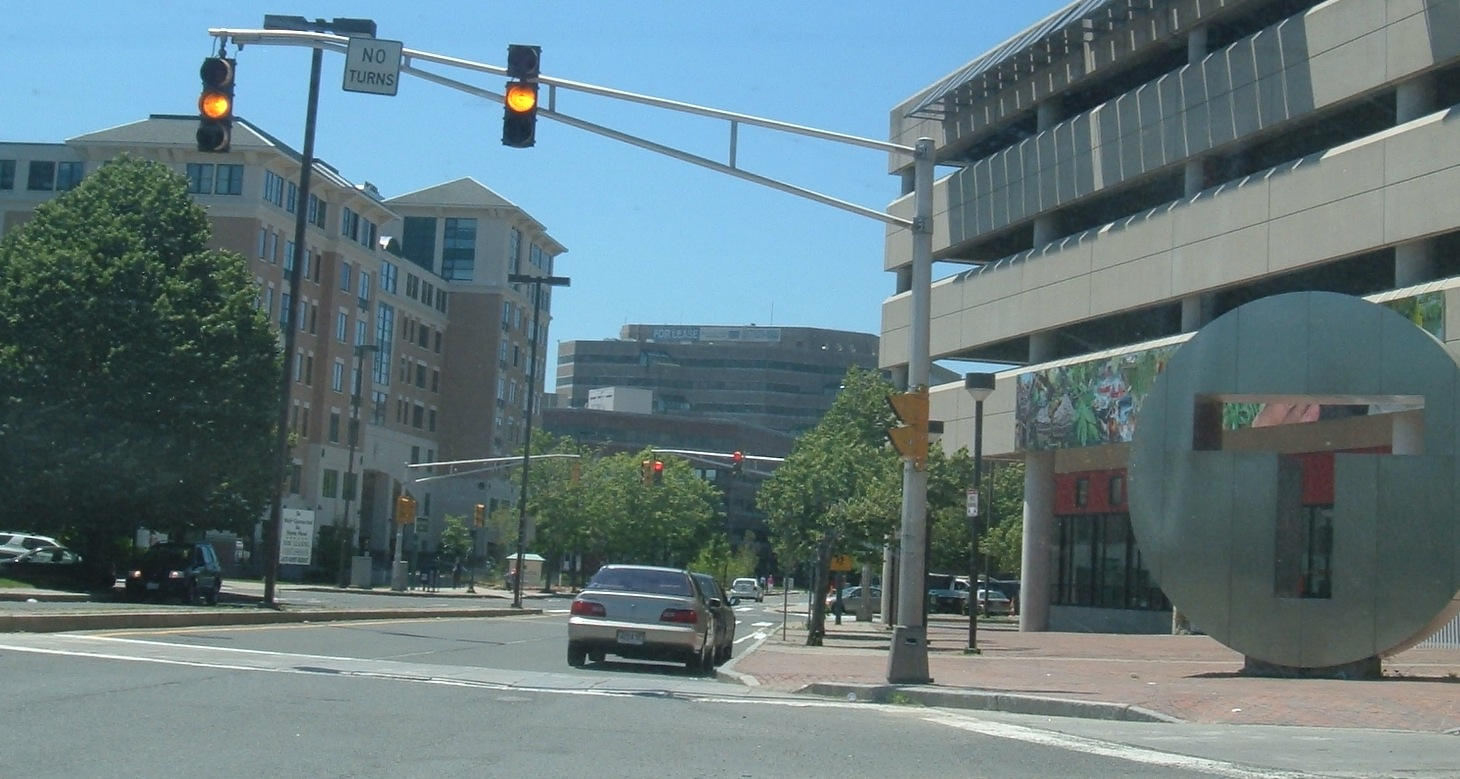
A transit-oriented development adjacent to Alewife Station, a Massachusetts Bay Transportation Authority (MBTA) intermodal transit station) in Cambridge, Massachusetts, U.S.

A transit village is a pedestrian-friendly mixed-use district or neighborhood oriented around the station of a high-quality transit system, such as rail or B.R.T. Often a civic square of public space abuts the train station, functioning as the hub or centerpiece of the surrounding community and encouraging social interaction. While mainly residential in nature, many transit villages offer convenience retail and services to residents heading to and from train stations.

The term "transit villages" was popularized in the 1997 book by Michael Bernick and Robert Cervero, Transit Villages for the 21st Century, whose cover shows a mixed-use, pedestrian-friendly community infilling what then was a surface park-and-ride lot of the Pleasant Hill BART station area, and what is now the Contra Costa Centre Transit Village. In their book, the authors distinguished transit villages from transit-oriented development (TOD) as more residentially-oriented in land-use composition, with neighborhood retail and services provided in and around the rail station and a prominent civic space immediately to the station.

Portland, Oregon has actively pursued transit village style development along the Portland area light rail known as Metropolitan Area Express (MAX). California is also exploring transit village development options for its evolving transit systems.

Miami, Florida has placed large affordable housing complexes at its two least used Metrorail stations, one is known as the Brownsville Transit Village and the other is Santa Clara Apartments. Miami-Dade Transit has its headquarters in the Overtown Transit Village building at one of its downtown stations.

== New Jersey Transit Village Initiative ==
New Jersey has become a national leader in promoting Transit Village development through a program known as the Transit Village initiative. The New Jersey Department of Transportation established the Transit Village Initiative in 1999, offering multi-agency assistance and grants from the annual $1 million Transit Village fund to any municipality with a ready to go project specifying appropriate mixed land-use strategy, available property, station-area management, and commitment to affordable housing, job growth, and culture. Transit village development must also preserve the architectural integrity of historically significant buildings. Transit Village districts are defined by the half mile radius surrounding the transit station. To become a Transit Village, towns must meet the following criteria: have existing transit, demonstrate a willingness to grow, adopt a transit-oriented-development redevelopment plan or zoning ordinance, identify specific TOD sites and projects, identify bicycle and pedestrian improvements, and identify "place making" efforts near the transit station, such as community events, celebrations, and other cultural or artistic events.

Since 1999 the state has made 36 Transit Village designations, which are in different stages of development:

Pleasantville (1999), Morristown (1999), Rutherford (1999), South Amboy (1999), South Orange (1999), Riverside (2001), Rahway (2002), Metuchen (2003), Belmar (2003), Bloomfield (2003), Bound Brook (2003), Collingswood (2003), Cranford (2003), Matawan (2003), New Brunswick (2005), Journal Square/Jersey City (2005), Netcong (2005), Elizabeth/Midtown (2007), Burlington City (2007), the City of Orange Township (2009), Montclair (2010), Somerville (2010), Linden (2010), West Windsor (2012), East Orange (2012), Dunellen (2012), Summit (2013), Plainfield (2014), Park Ridge (2015), Irvington (2015) Hackensack (2016), Long Branch (2016), Asbury Park (2017), Newark (2021), Atlantic City (2023), and High Bridge (2025).

== See also ==
- Automotive city – Urban planning prioritising automobiles
- Bicycle-friendly – Urban planning prioritising cycling
- Commuter town
- Complete streets – Transportation policy and design approach
- Living street – Traffic calming in spaces shared between road users
- New Urbanism
- Pedestrian village – Urban planning for mixed-use areas prioritising pedestrians
- Principles of Intelligent Urbanism
- Smart growth
- Streetcar suburb – Residential community developed by streetcar lines
- Sustainable Development Goal 11 – 11th of 17 Sustainable Development Goals for sustainable cities
- Transit-oriented development – Urban planning prioritising transit
- Transit-proximate development – Urban planning prioritising automobiles and transit
- Urban sprawl
- Transit metropolis – Regional transit development
