= California Public Employment Relations Board =

The California Public Employment Relations Board (PERB) is an independent state agency within the California Labor and Workforce Development Agency.

It is a quasi-judicial administrative agency charged with administering the collective bargaining statutes covering employees of California’s public schools, colleges, and universities, employees of the state government, employees of California local public agencies (cities, counties and special districts), trial court employees, trial court interpreters, supervisory employees of the Los Angeles County Metropolitan Transportation Authority, Judicial Council employees, Orange County Transportation Authority employees, Bay Area Rapid Transit District (BART) employees, Sacramento Regional Transit District employees, Santa Cruz Metropolitan Transit District employees, Santa Clara Valley Transportation Authority employees, and child care providers who participate in a state-funded early care and education program.

== History ==
In 1975, the California State Legislature passed the Education Employment Relations Act (EERA) and established the Education Employment Relations Board (EERB). In 1977, the Legislature enacted the State Employer-Employee Relations Act (later named the Ralph C. Dills Act), which established collective bargaining for state employees for the first time and renamed the board to its current name. Further laws have expanded the board's powers:

- Higher Education Employer-Employee Relations Act (HEERA) of 1979, extending the same coverage to the California State University System, the University of California System and UC Law San Francisco
- The Meyers-Milias-Brown Act (MMBA) of 1968 establishing collective bargaining for California’s municipal, county, and local special district employers and employees was brought under PERB’s jurisdiction pursuant to Senate Bill 739 (Chapter 901, Statutes of 2000), effective July 1, 2001. PERB’s jurisdiction over the MMBA excludes peace officers, management employees and the City and County of Los Angeles
- Los Angeles County Metropolitan Transportation Authority Transit Employer-Employee Relations Act (TEERA) of 2003, covering supervisory employees of the transit agency
- SB 1102 (Chapter 227, Statutes of 2004), brought the Trial Court Employment Protection and Governance Act (Trial Court Act) and the Trial Court Interpreter Employment and Labor Relations Act (Court Interpreter Act) under PERB’s jurisdiction
- Judicial Council Employer-Employee Relations Act (JCEERA, AB 83 (Stats. 2017, Ch. 835)), established collective bargaining for employees of the Judicial Council.
- Public Employee Communication Chapter (PECC) (AB 119, 2017) gives exclusive representatives of California’s public employees specific rights for communication with represented members.
- Prohibition on Public Employers Deterring or Discouraging Union Membership (PEDD, SB 285, 2017), prohibits public employer interference with the right to organize or join a union
- Building a Better Early Care and Education System Act of 2019, known as the Childcare Provider Act (CCPA), establishes right to collective bargaining for family childcare providers who participate in a state-funded early care and education program
- AB 355 (2019), extends PERB jurisdiction to OCTA workers
- AB 2850 (2020), extends PERB jurisdiction to BART workers
- SB 598 (2021), extends PERB jurisdiction to SacRT workers
- SB 597 (2022), extends PERB jurisdiction to SCMTD workers
- AB 2524 (2022), extends PERB jurisdiction to VTA workers
- AB 288 (2025), allowing California workers covered under the National Labor Relations Act as of January 1, 2025 to petition the PERB when the federal National Labor Relations Board does not respond to unfair labor practice challenges, issue bargaining orders or respond to certification petitions within six months; creating the PERB Enforcement Fund sustained by civil penalties from employers found in violation of labor laws.

== Members ==
The current members of the PERB are:

- Eric Banks
- Arthur A. Krantz
- Lou Paulson
- Mark Krausse
- vacant

=== Former members ===
- Reginald Alleyne, Jr. (Brown 1976)
- Jerilou H. Cossack (Brown 1976)
- Raymond J. Gonzales (Brown 1976)
- Harry Gluck (Brown 1978)
- Barbara D. Moore (Brown 1979)
- John Jaeger (Brown 1980)
- Irene Tovar (Brown 1980)
- Nancy Burt (Brown 1982)
- Marty Morgenstern (Brown 1982)
- Virgil Jensen (Brown 1982)
- Deborah M. Hesse (Deukmejian 1984)
- Stephen Porter (Deukmejian 1985)
- William A. Craib (Deukmejian1986)
- Willard A. Shank (Deukmejian 1987)
- Betty Cordoba (Deukmejian 1987)
- Richard L. Camilli (Deukmejian 1989)
- Alex R. Cunningham (Deukmejian 1990)
- Huston T. Carlyle, Jr. (Deukmejian 1991)
- David M. Caffrey (Wilson 1992)
- Sue Blair (Wilson 1993)
- Marz Garcia (Wilson 1993)
- James C. Johnson (Wilson1994)
- Martin B. Dyer (Wilson 1996)
- Antonio C. Amador (Wilson 1997)
- Donald A. Jackson (Wilson 1997)
- Richard T. Baker (Davis 2000)
- Alfred K. Whitehead (Davis 2001)
- Theodore G. Neima (Davis 2002)
- John C. Duncan (Schwarzenegger 2004)
- Lilian S. Shek (Schwarzenegger 2005)
- Sally M. McKeag (Schwarzenegger 2005)
- Karen L. Neuwald (Schwarzenegger 2006)
- Robin W. Wesley (Schwarzenegger 2008)
- Tiffany Rystrom (Schwarzenegger 2008)
- Alice Dowdin Calvillo (Schwarzenegger 2008)
- Kari Miner (Schwarzenegger 2011)
- Anita Martinez (Brown 2011)
- A. Eugene Huguenin (Brown 2011)
- Priscilla S. Winslow (Brown 2013)
- Eric R. Banks (Brown 2013)
- Mark Gregersen (Brown 2015)
- Ari Krantz (Brown 2018)
- Erich Shiners (Brown 2018)
- Louis Paulson (Newsom 2019)
