= LeRoy Chatfield =

American social justice activist (1934–2026)

Director of Administration for Jerry Brown
- In office 1975–1977

Member of the California Agricultural Labor Relations Board
- In office 1975–1976

Director of the California Conservation Corps
- In office 1977–1979
- Appointed by: Jerry Brown
- Succeeded by: B. T. Collins

Personal details
- Born: LeRoy Joseph Chatfield; 1934 Arbuckle, California, U.S.
- Died: September 15, 2026 (aged 91–92) Sacramento, California, U.S.
- Spouse: Bonnie Burns
- Children: 5
- Education: Saint Mary's College of California
- Occupation: Teacher, farm-labor organizer, state official, nonprofit executive

LeRoy Joseph Chatfield (1934 – September 15, 2026) was an American teacher, farm-labor organizer, California state official, and non-profit executive.

== Early life and education ==
Chatfield was born in 1934 in Arbuckle, California. He grew up in a family of rice farmers, and at 14, his parents sent him to a Christian Brothers school near Napa. It was there that he took an oath to live in poverty and became a Catholic priest. He completed his religious training at St. Mary’s College of California.

== Career ==
Chatfield taught high school in San Francisco and the San Joaquin Valley for several years, including at Garces Memorial High School. In 1965, at age 31, he left the Christian Brothers and joined César Chávez’s farmworker organizing effort with the United Farm Workers.

As part of his work with the UFW, Chatfield was a top aide and spokesman for Chávez. He developed plans for clinics, pharmacies, and cooperatives for farmworker families. He also bought land in Delano for the United Farm Workers’ headquarters, and he helped create the union’s medical plan. He left the UFW in 1973 after eight years.

Chatfield later managed Esteban Torres’s congressional campaign as well as Jerry Brown’s gubernatorial campaign in Northern California. Early in Brown's tenure as governor Chatfield served as the director of administration.

Governor Jerry Brown appointed Chatfield to the California Agricultural Labor Relations Board in 1975, and later as the director of the California Conservation Corps in 1977. During his tenure, the Corps opened 18 centers.

In 1987 Chatfield became the first executive director of the charity Loaves & Fishes, where he helped provide food and shelter services for people without homes in Sacramento. In 1997, Sacramento sued Loaves & Fishes. The city claimed that unpermitted programs violated zoning laws and constituted public nuisances. The charity countersued, saying that the city was using zoning requirements to restrict its religious mandate and discriminate against the poor. After mediation, both sides dropped their lawsuits in July 1997 under an agreement that allowed meals to continue while Loaves & Fishes pursued permits and sought a new location for its youth center. Chatfield retired from Loaves & Fishes in 2000.

In 2002, Chatfield began the Farmworker Movement Documentation Project. He recorded interviews with UFW figures and built a digital archive, which was acquired by UC San Diego in 2013.

In 2019, Chatfield published To Serve the People: My Life Organizing with Cesar Chavez and the Poor, a memoir of his time working with Chavez and the UFW.

== Personal life and death ==
Chatfield married Bonnie Burns, who he met during his work with the UFW, and together they had five children. Chatfield died in Sacramento on September 15, 2026, at age 92.
