= Burnham v. Superior Court of California =

- Supreme Court of the United States

Argued February 28, 1990 Decided May 29, 1990
- Full case name: Dennis Burnham v. Superior Court of California, County of Marin
- Citations: 495 U.S. 604 (more) 110 S. Ct. 2105; 109 L. Ed. 2d 631.

Case history
- Prior: Writ of certiorari to the California Court of Appeal, First Appellate District

Holding
- Personal jurisdiction can be exercised over a nonresident who was personally served with process while temporarily in that State, in a suit unrelated to his activities in the State.

Court membership
- Chief Justice William Rehnquist Associate Justices William J. Brennan Jr. · Byron White; Thurgood Marshall · Harry Blackmun; John P. Stevens · Sandra Day O'Connor; Antonin Scalia · Anthony Kennedy

Case opinions
- Plurality: Scalia, joined by Rehnquist, Kennedy; White (in part)
- Concurrence: White
- Concurrence: Brennan, joined by Marshall, Blackmun, O'Connor
- Concurrence: Stevens

Laws applied
- U.S. Const. amend. XIV

Burnham v. Superior Court of California, 495 U.S. 604 (1990), was a United States Supreme Court case addressing whether a state court may, consistent with the Due Process Clause of the Fourteenth Amendment, exercise personal jurisdiction over a non-resident of the state who is served with process while temporarily visiting the state. All nine justices unanimously agreed that this basis for personal jurisdiction—known as "transient jurisdiction"—is constitutionally permissible. However, the Court failed to produce a majority opinion, as the members were sharply divided on the reasons for the decision, reflecting two fundamentally different approaches to how due-process issues are to be analyzed. Justice Scalia wrote the lead opinion, joined in whole or part by three other Justices. Justice Brennan wrote an opinion joined by three other Justices. Justices White and Stevens wrote separate opinions.

== Background ==
Dennis Burnham and Frances Cecilia (Perelman) Burnham, a married couple residing in New Jersey, agreed to divorce. Francie moved to California on July 14, 1987, with the couple's two children. Thereafter she persuaded Dennis to delay filing the divorce action in New Jersey until 18 months of separation would qualify for a "no fault" divorce. Then, several months later in early 1988 and prior to the 6-month residency requirement in California, Francie filed an action for divorce in California Superior Court. Upon learning of this action, Dennis attempted to promptly file and serve the New Jersey action instead of waiting 12 more months. Dennis was served with the summons when he travelled to California to handle an unrelated business matter and visit his children; service was made on a Sunday in the children's home. The following day, Francie was served with the New Jersey summons. Courts later held that the California action was "first in time."

Dennis filed a "special appearance" in the California court and moved to quash the service of process. He argued that he was a non-resident of California and had no connection with California sufficient to establish personal jurisdiction over him consistent with the Due Process Clause of the Fourteenth Amendment. Initially, the Superior Court in Marin County, California granted Dennis's request to allow New Jersey to decide the personal in personam jurisdiction issues and submit the subject matter in rem jurisdiction issues to California. Then, on a motion to reconsider, citing Pennoyer v. Neff (1877), the Superior Court reversed and denied Dennis's request to quash service. Dennis then petitioned for a writ of mandate from the California Court of Appeal for the First Appellate District, which denied relief, as did the California Supreme Court. Dennis then sought review from the United States Supreme Court, which granted certiorari to address the continued validity of transient jurisdiction in light of recent developments in the law of personal jurisdiction.

Approximately 29 months after the U.S. Supreme Court's decision, the California Superior Court granted the divorce in October 1992.

=== Legal background ===
At common law, recognized by the Supreme Court in Pennoyer v. Neff (1877), a civil action was commenced by serving process on the defendant within the forum jurisdiction. Service on a defendant within the forum state created jurisdiction over the defendant regardless of whether the defendant was a resident of the state or was merely visiting it, and regardless of whether the subject-matter of the lawsuit had anything to do with the defendant's activities in the state.

Subsequently, in International Shoe Co. v. Washington (1946) and Shaffer v. Heitner (1977), the Supreme Court held that the Due Process Clause requires that a state's exercise of personal jurisdiction over a defendant must comport with "traditional notions of fair play and substantial justice," at least when the defendant was not served with process in the forum state.

The issue in Burnham was whether, in light of International Shoe and Shaffer, service on a non-resident visiting a state remained a constitutionally-sufficient basis for the exercise of personal jurisdiction over the non-resident.

== Judgment ==
The Court unanimously agreed that exercise of personal jurisdiction over Dennis Burnham based on "transient jurisdiction" through service of process was proper. However, the Justices could not agree on a rationale for the result, producing four separate opinions.

=== Plurality ===
Justice Scalia delivered the lead opinion in the case, joined by Chief Justice Rehnquist, Justice Kennedy, and in part by Justice White. Justice Scalia began by defining the question presented as "whether the Due Process Clause of the Fourteenth Amendment denies California courts jurisdiction over a nonresident, who was personally served with process while temporarily in that State, in a suit unrelated to his activities in the State."

Justice Scalia took a historical approach to answering this question. In Justice Scalia's view, buttressed by citation of numerous cases, "[a]mong the most firmly established principles of personal jurisdiction in American tradition is that the courts of a State have jurisdiction over nonresidents who are physically present in the State." At common law, service of process on the defendant within the forum state was a prerequisite to exercising jurisdiction over the defendant in that state. In cases such as International Shoe Co. v. Washington and Shaffer v. Heitner, the Court had accepted that a non-resident served outside a state could still be subject to jurisdiction, but only where the defendant had "certain minimum contacts with it such that the maintenance of the suit does not offend 'traditional notions of fair play and substantial justice.'" However, these cases did not support the converse argument that the longstanding practice of obtaining jurisdiction over a defendant by serving process within the forum might now violate due process. "[A] a doctrine of personal jurisdiction that dates back to the adoption of the Fourteenth Amendment and is still generally observed unquestionably meets th[e] standard" of due process.

With tag jurisdiction having “the sanction of settled usage”, such service and personal jurisdiction is constitutional because it is traditional. Justice Scalia thus advocated for a historical test as one method to determine the constitutionality of a court's exercise of personal jurisdiction.

Justice Scalia criticized Justice Brennan's concurrence as advocating for vague standards and using circular logic. Scalia dislikes the idea of applying "'contemporary notions of due process' to determine the constitutionality of California's assertion of jurisdiction". He also explains that Justice Brennan is using circular logic, which Scalia summarizes as "[t]he existence of a continuing tradition is not enough; fairness also must be considered; fairness exists here because there is a continuing tradition". Scalia also expresses serious disagreement with the idea of a defendant establishing jurisdiction by "[availing himself] of significant benefits provided by the State" because this would create an extremely vague and unclear standard. Scalia asks about someone enjoying fifteen minutes worth of "benefits" (rather than the three days as in the actual case) as being sufficient, thus explaining why this proposed rule is exceptionally vague.

=== Concurrences ===
==== Brennan ====
Justice Brennan, in an opinion joined by Justices Marshall, Blackmun and O'Connor, concurred that California could constitutionally exercise jurisdiction over Dennis Burnham because he had been served with process while visiting the state. However, Justice Brennan rejected Justice Scalia's contention that the long history of allowing transient jurisdiction was sufficient to resolve the case. According to Justice Brennan, the Court's decision in Shaffer v. Heitner required that all methods of obtaining jurisdiction must be evaluated according to contemporary notions of due process.

Justice Brennan acknowledged that while not dispositive, the historical pedigree of transient jurisdiction was relevant in evaluating its constitutionality, because it provided potential defendants with notice that visiting a state could lead to their being subject to jurisdiction on a lawsuit in that state. While voluntarily present in a state, an individual avails himself of benefits provided by that state. Moreover, developments in modern communications and transportation make it much less burdensome than previously for a non-resident to defend himself or herself in another jurisdiction. Procedural devices such as the doctrine of forum non conveniens are available in a case where litigating in the forum would be genuinely burdensome. Justice Brennan concluded that "[f]or these reasons, as a rule the exercise of personal jurisdiction over a defendant based on his voluntary presence in the forum will satisfy the requirements of due process."

==== White ====
In a short opinion concurring in part and concurring in the judgment, Justice White stated that "[t]he rule allowing jurisdiction to be obtained over a nonresident by personal service in the forum state, without more, has been and is so widely accepted throughout this country that I could not possibly strike it down, either on its face or as applied in this case, on the ground that it denies due process of law guaranteed by the Fourteenth Amendment." In Justice White's view, while the Supreme Court has authority to strike down even traditional accepted procedures that do not provide due process, there was no basis for doing so in this case. There was no showing that allowing service of process within a state to provide a basis for jurisdiction "is so arbitrary and lacking in common sense in so many instances that it should be held violative of Due Process in every case." To avoid endless litigation, Justice White concluded that challenges to the fairness of jurisdiction based on service in individual cases need not be entertained, "[a]t least ... where presence in the forum state is intentional, which would almost always be the fact."

==== Stevens ====
In a separate opinion concurring in the judgment, Justice Stevens stated that he declined to join either Justice Scalia's or Justice Brennan's opinion because he was "concerned by [their] unnecessarily broad reach." Justice Stevens stated that the historical evidence cited by Justice Scalia, the considerations of fairness discussed by Justice Brennan, and the common sense of Justice White's concurrence, "all combine to demonstrate that this is, indeed, a very easy case." In a footnote, Justice Stevens laconically mused that "[p]erhaps the adage about hard cases making bad law should be revised to cover easy cases."
