= Transit metropolis =

Regional transit development

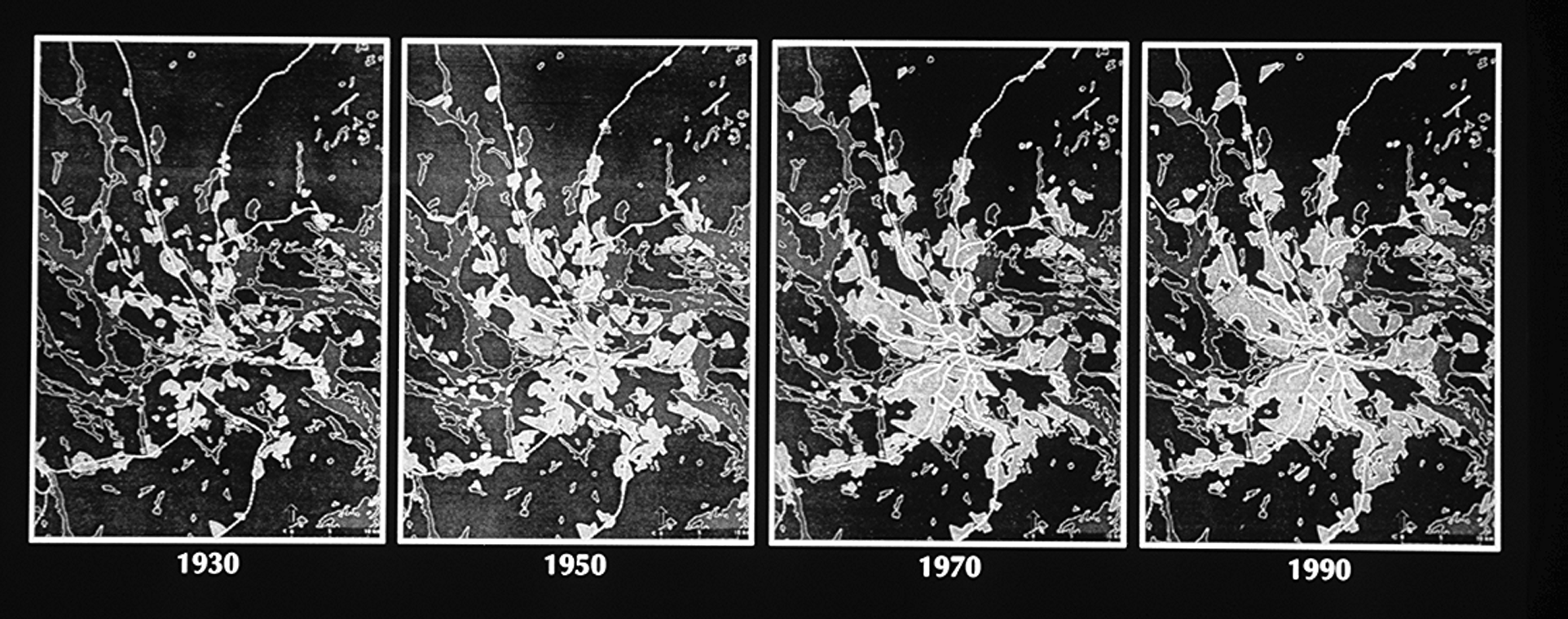
Evolution of Stockholm as a Transit Metropolis, 1930 to 1990, with urbanization following the Metro, built in advance of demand to help guide regional growth; Source: R. Cervero, The Transit Metropolis, 1998

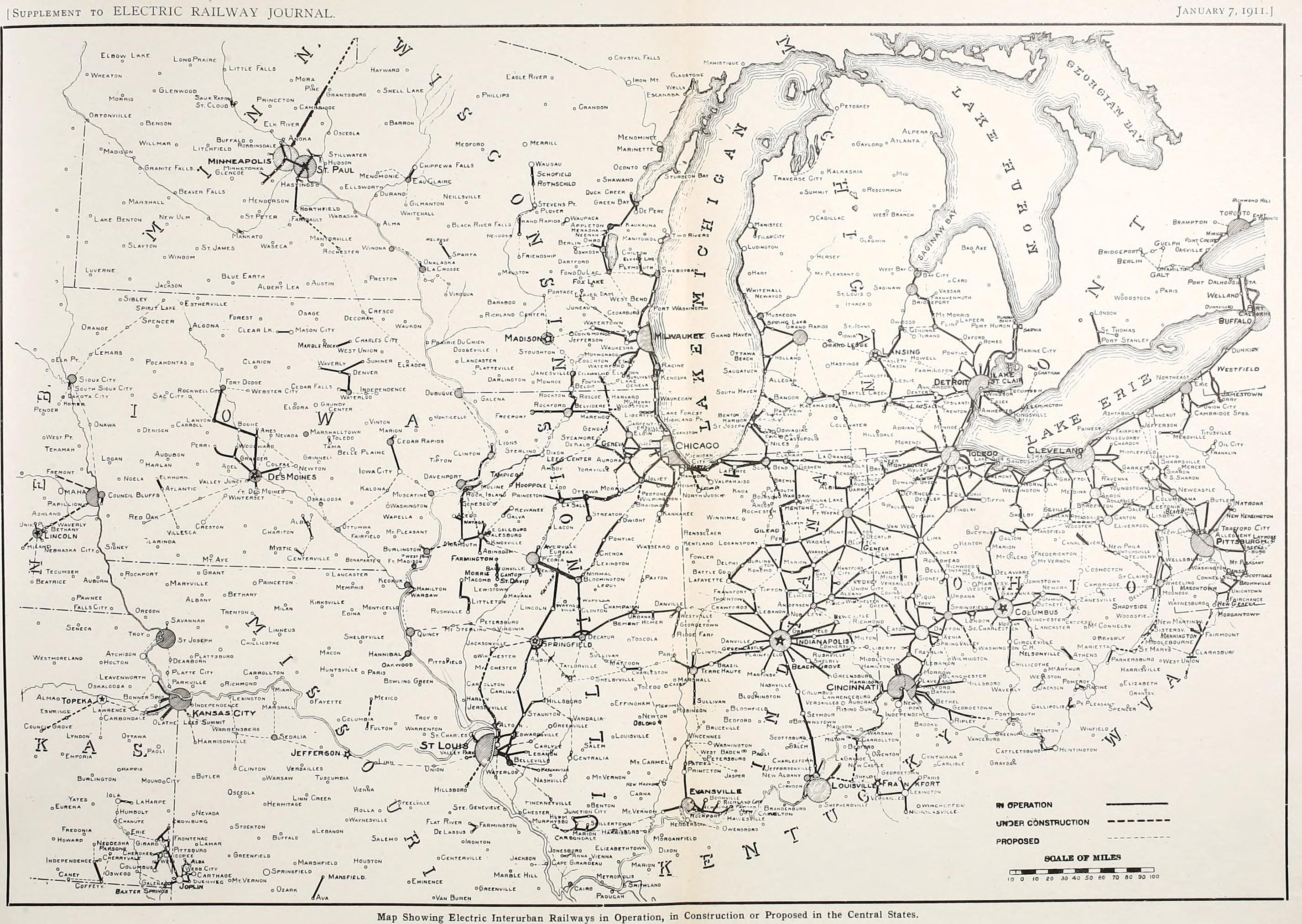
Interurban network in the Midwestern United States in 1911

A transit metropolis is an urbanized region with high-quality public transportation services and settlement patterns that are conducive to riding public transit. While transit villages and transit-oriented developments (TODs) focus on creating compact, mixed-use neighborhoods around rail stations, transit metropolises represent a regional constellation of TODs that benefit from having both trip origins and destinations oriented to public transport stations. In an effort to reduce mounting traffic congestion problems and improve environmental conditions, a number of Chinese mega-cities, including Beijing and Shenzhen, have embraced the transit metropolis model for guiding urban growth and public-transport investment decisions.

Around the world, mass transit has been struggling to compete with private automobiles and in many places its market is eroding. Transit metropolis and TOD are among the planning strategies being introduced to help reserve ridership losses and advance more sustainable patterns of urban development.

Transit metropolises recognize that one or two TODs as islands in a sea of automobile-oriented development (AOD) will do little to get people out of cars and into trains and buses. Only when TODs are organized along linear corridors, as in Stockholm, Copenhagen and Curitiba, or inter-connected by high-capacity transit at a regional scale can they significantly reduce car-dependence and improve environmental conditions.

== See also ==
- Commuter town
- New Urbanism
- Smart growth
- Streetcar suburb
- Sustainable Development Goal 11 – 11th of 17 Sustainable Development Goals for sustainable cities
- Transit-oriented development
