= Writ of mandate (California) =

Type of extraordinary writ in California

The writ of mandate is a type of extraordinary writ in the U.S. state of California. In California, certain writs are used by the superior courts, courts of appeal and the Supreme Court to command lower bodies, including both courts and administrative agencies, to do or not to do certain things. A writ of mandate may be granted by a court as an order to an inferior tribunal, corporation, board or person, both public and private. Unlike the federal court system, where interlocutory appeals may be taken on a permissive basis and mandamus are usually used to contest recusal decisions, the writ of mandate in California is not restricted to purely ministerial tasks, but can be used to correct any legal error by the trial court. Nonetheless, ordinary writ relief in the Court of Appeal is rarely granted.

Writs are generally divided into two categories: the most common form of writ petition is ordinary mandate, which is a highly informal process mostly governed by advisory rules of court rather than by strict rules or statutes. A separate and much more formalized procedure called administrative mandate is used to review certain decisions by administrative agencies after adjudicatory hearings, and are distinguished from ordinary writ proceedings by the addition of a panoply of statutory requirements. Despite the name, however, ordinary mandate encompasses a wider variety of administrative appeals than administrative mandate does, and an administrative mandate petition may allege ordinary mandate as another cause of action. Many common writ petitions directed towards administrative bodies, such as actions to compel the disclosure of public records, do not share the requirements of administrative mandate as there is no 'adjudicatory hearing'.

== Appellate ==
Only a few specific orders besides final judgments are subject to appeal in California. As such, the only way for most interlocutory decisions to be reviewed before trial is through ordinary mandate. Most such petitions arise under the courts' common-law writ authority and have no express statutory deadline. Courts have generally applied a prudential, but not jurisdictional, 60-day period by analogy to the usual time for appeal.

=== Procedure ===
A litigant begins the process by filing a petition, often styled as a petition for writ of mandate, prohibition or other extraordinary relief, against the trial court as respondent and naming the opposing party as the real party in interest. Immediately upon receiving the writ petition, the court may deny the petition, stay the trial court proceedings, issue an alternative writ or an order to show cause, or notify the parties that it intends to issue a peremptory writ in the first instance.

The vast majority of appellate writs are summarily denied without explanation because, with few exceptions, they are not a "cause" requiring an appellate court to issue a written decision with reasons stated under the California Constitution.

An alternative writ and order to show cause are identical in effect, but semantically slightly different; an alternative writ directs the trial court either to comply with its terms or show cause why it should not be ordered to do so, while an order to show cause only directs the trial court to show cause why the relief should not be granted. This is the most common way for writ petitions to be granted.

In extraordinary cases, the court may issue a Palma notice, advising the real party in interest that the court is considering granting a peremptory writ in the first instance, i.e. granting the requested relief immediately. This is intended to give the party the opportunity to raise uncertainty in the law or facts and persuade the court to issue an alternative writ instead.

=== Statutory writs ===
Certain writ proceedings are prescribed by statute. Statutory writ provisions commonly impose short filing deadlines, often 20 days or less, but review remains discretionary except where writ review is the exclusive means of appellate review.

In civil cases

- Grant or denial of motion to disqualify judge
- Grant or denial of motion to change venue
- Grant or denial of motion to expunge lis pendens
- Denial of motion to quash service of process
- Grant or denial of motion for summary adjudication or denial of motion for summary judgment
- Grant or denial of motion for good faith settlement determination
- Denial or partial grant of a special motion to strike in a malicious prosecution action predicated on a lawsuit dismissed through a special motion to strike

In criminal cases

- Grant or denial of motion to disqualify judge
- Denial of motion to set aside indictment or information
- Denial of motion to suppress evidence in felony case

As review of the outcome of a writ proceeding in the superior court

- Grant or denial of a petition for writ of mandate or prohibition by the appellate division of a superior court
- Grant or denial of petition for writ of mandate to compel agency to disclose public records
- Denial of petition for writ of mandate to compel board to reverse revocation, suspension or restriction of a medical license

=== Mandatory review ===
Although writ review is almost always discretionary, there are situations where a writ proceeding is the only way for a final judgment or order to be reviewed on appeal because the decision is not appealable. In those cases, the writ is no longer discretionary and the Court of Appeal must issue a full decision on the issue. For example, a writ petition is the only way for a denial of a Public Records Act lawsuit to be appealed; as such, the petition must be considered in its whole.

== Trial court ==
Writ petitions can also be filed with a superior court in order to compel an administrative agency or other entity, public or private, to perform a duty required by law. Although these petitions can be filed with the court of appeal or Supreme Court in the first instance, they are usually summarily denied without prejudice.

=== Administrative mandate ===
Historically, California administrative agency decisions were reviewed by the courts through the issuance of writs of certiorari. In 1936, the Supreme Court of California held that because the state constitution reserves judicial decisionmaking to the judicial branch, it lacked jurisdiction to issue a writ of certiorari to review the decision of a state board unless that board had been expressly authorized by the state constitution to exercise judicial power. The court applied similar reasoning to the writ of prohibition the next year. To avoid the obvious implication that nearly all California government agency decisions were now entirely immune from judicial review, the court held in 1939 that the writ of mandate could be used instead for that purpose. The high court struggled over the next few years, without success, to formulate a coherent standard of review for this new kind of appellate review. Regardless, the state legislature ratified and endorsed the new concept of administrative mandate in 1945 by enacting Code of Civil Procedure section 1094.5.

Administrative mandate lies to review "any final administrative order or decision made as the result of a proceeding in which by law a hearing is required to be given, evidence is required to be taken, and discretion in the determination of facts is vested in the inferior tribunal". Proceedings subject to review by administrative mandate usually occur before state government agencies, such as the California Unemployment Insurance Appeals Board, the State Hearings Division of the Department of Social Services and the various divisions of the Department of Industrial Relations. Constitutional agencies are subject to both certiorari and administrative mandate; in those cases, a court's review of their factual findings is "limited to a determination whether those findings are supported by substantial evidence in light of the whole record" in deference to their limited judicial powers. Proceedings before local government agencies are also reviewable through administrative mandate.

In general, this type of proceeding is initiated by the timely filing of a petition for administrative mandate in a superior court (that is, a trial court). The petitioner must arrange for the lodging of the administrative record, and then, depending upon local rules, get the petition onto the court's motion calendar for a hearing and ruling on its merits by way of an ex parte application for an order to show cause or a motion for writ of administrative mandate. The superior court either holds oral argument or publishes a tentative ruling followed by hearing oral argument, and then files an order granting or denying the petition. Further appellate relief is pursued on direct appeal before the relevant Court of Appeal (rather than by another writ petition).

Four state government agencies are entirely exempt from administrative mandate. Appellate review of the decisions of the Agricultural Labor Relations Board, the Public Utilities Commission, and the Workers Compensation Appeals Board of the Department of Industrial Relations is available only by petition for writ of review (California's modern term for certiorari) to the relevant California Court of Appeal. Appellate review of the decisions of the Public Employment Relations Board is available only by way of a petition for "extraordinary review" to the relevant Court of Appeal.

== Notable proceedings ==
- In Lockyer v. City and County of San Francisco (2004), an original mandate proceeding, the Supreme Court ordered San Francisco officials to comply with then-existing marriage statutes and declared approximately 4,000 marriage licenses issued to same-sex couples void. The court expressly did not decide the statutes' constitutionality.
- In California Redevelopment Association v. Matosantos (2011), the Supreme Court exercised original writ jurisdiction over two statutes enacted during a fiscal emergency. It upheld legislation dissolving California's redevelopment agencies but invalidated a companion measure that would have allowed agencies to continue if their sponsoring governments made payments to state funds.
- Make UC a Good Neighbor v. Regents of the University of California (2024) arose from an administrative mandate challenge under the California Environmental Quality Act to UC Berkeley's proposed housing at People's Park. After the Legislature enacted Assembly Bill 1307, the Supreme Court held that the challengers' remaining claims lacked merit and directed entry of judgment for the university.
- In Legislature of the State of California v. Weber (2024), the Supreme Court issued a peremptory writ directing the Secretary of State to keep the Taxpayer Protection and Government Accountability Act off the November 2024 ballot. The court held that the initiative would revise, rather than merely amend, the California Constitution and therefore could not be proposed through the initiative process.
