= California Agricultural Labor Relations Act of 1975 =

1975 U.S. state law giving farmers the right of collective bargaining

California State Legislature
- Full name: California Agricultural Labor Relations Act of 1975
- Acronym: CALRA
- Introduced: April 10, 1975
- Signed into law: June 4, 1975
- Governor: Jerry Brown

Status: Current legislation (amended)

The California Agricultural Labor Relations Act (CALRA) (Note: Also referred to as the "Alatorre-Zenovich-Dunlap-Berman Agricultural Labor Relations Act of 1975") is a landmark statute in United States labor law that was enacted by the state of California in 1975, establishing the right to collective bargaining for farmworkers in that state, a first in U.S. history.

The goal of the Act is to "ensure peace in the agricultural fields by guaranteeing justice for all agricultural workers and stability in labor relations." The Act, part of the California Labor Code, explicitly encourages and protects "the right of agricultural employees to full freedom of association, self-organization, and designation of representatives of their own choosing, to negotiate the terms and conditions of their employment, and to be free from the interference, restraint, or coercion of employers of labor, or their agents, in the designation of such representatives or in self-organization or in other concerted activities for the purpose of collective bargaining or other mutual aid or protection."

The Act established rules and authorized regulations similar to those of National Labor Relations Act, a federal law which formally protected the collective bargaining rights of most American workers except farm and domestic workers. The California Agricultural Labor Relations Board (ALRB) administers the Act. The ALRB has two functions: To conduct, oversee, and certify representation elections, and to investigate unfair labor practice (ULP) charges and pursue remedies. Administrative law judges and agency staff adjudicate most cases, with the five-member Board serving as a final arbiter.

== Background ==
Collective bargaining rights for most hourly workers in the United States were first given legal protection in 1933 by Section 7a of the National Industrial Recovery Act (NIRA). Although NIRA did not specifically exempt agricultural laborers from the protection of the Act, the Roosevelt administration—eager to win over farm-state members of Congress—argued that farmworkers were excluded. When the National Labor Relations Act (NLRA) was enacted in 1935, it, too, specifically exempted agricultural workers due to pressure from the "farm bloc" in Congress. Although a number of attempts were made in the 1920s, 1930s and 1940s to organize farm laborers, these efforts were unsuccessful.

In August 1966, the National Farm Workers Association and Agricultural Workers Organizing Committee, two unrecognized and relatively minor labor unions claiming to represent farm workers in California, merged to form the United Farm Workers Organizing Committee (the predecessor organization to the United Farm Workers). Adopting the philosophy of pacifism in the face of often violent reaction to its organizing efforts and engaging in strikes, hunger strikes, boycotts and secondary boycotts (including the particularly successful Delano grape strike), marches, rallies, and cutting-edge public relations campaigns, the United Farm Workers (UFW) began organizing large numbers of agricultural laborers into unions. In some cases, the UFW even won recognition and negotiated contracts.

== Impetus for legal action ==
=== The Salad Bowl strike ===
A series of violent strikes and inter-union jurisdictional battles set the political stage for passage of the California Agricultural Labor Relations Act. By 1969, the UFW was on the verge of winning the four-year-old Delano grape strike. But as the Delano grape strike seemed to be ending, an attempt by the International Brotherhood of Teamsters to organize farm laborers in the Salinas Valley in California led to the costly "Salad Bowl strike." Six thousand drivers and packing workers represented by the Teamsters struck on July 17, 1970, winning a contract on July 23 under which growers gave the Teamsters, not the UFW, access to farms and the right to organize workers into unions. Secret talks between the UFW and the Teamsters led to an agreement to return jurisdiction over the field workers to the farm union, but the agreement collapsed on August 23 and 7,000 UFW workers struck the Salinas Valley growers. Violence, sporadic at first but increasingly widespread, began to occur in the fields. On December 4, federal marshals arrested and jailed César Chávez. Two days later, an anti-union mob nearly rioted when former Olympic gold medal-winning decathlete Rafer Johnson and Ethel Kennedy, widow of slain Senator Robert F. Kennedy visited Chávez in jail. The two unions signed a new jurisdictional agreement reaffirming the UFW's right to organize field workers,

=== Worsening violence of the jurisdictional dispute ===
The Teamsters resumed their dispute with the UFW in December 1972, which led to further extensive disruptions in the state agricultural industry, mass picketing, mass arrests, and extensive violence. Many growers signed contracts with the Teamsters on April 15, and thousands of UFW members began picketing in the fields. Mass arrests jailed more than 1,700 UFW members by late July (some county jails had three times the number of detainees they were legally capable of holding), and UFW members accused law enforcement officers of beating detainees.

Soon organizing battles between the two unions became violent. "Flying squads" of Teamsters began attacking UFW supporters in broad daylight in the Coachella Valley. The violence worsened when the dispute moved into the Delano vineyards. Seventy farm workers were attacked on July 31, a UFW picketer was shot on August 3, five firebombs were thrown at UFW picket lines on August 9, two UFW members were shot on August 11, and a UFW picketer was shot to death on August 16. Finally, a tentative agreement was reached on September 27, 1973; the Teamsters again agreed to leave jurisdiction over farm field workers to the UFW.

The new agreement did not last long. On November 7, just 41 days later, the Teamsters union said it would not repudiate the contracts it had signed. But the UFW now had too few resources and membership to do much about it. The UFW deployed its best strategic weapon, the boycott, and kept up the push for a national boycott of grapes, wine and lettuce. The Teamsters reiterated their pledge to uphold their contracts in November.

By late 1974, many observers concluded that the UFW was no longer a viable force. It called a few small strikes, defied court injunctions to stop picketing, and continued pushing its national boycotts. But in July, it was forced to end picketing at some grape fields near Delano. The Teamsters were in no better position to win organizing battles. It had opened a major organizing drive in March 1974 and established a regional farm workers' local in June, but the effort was in chaos by November. Newspaper columnists, however, began wondering in June whether the UFW had any capacity to fight, and by February 1975 had concluded the union had no future.

=== The Modesto march and the push for legislation ===
The ongoing fight between the Teamsters and UFW and its effect on UFW's organizational viability led César Chávez to seriously consider legal reform as a solution to his union's problems. Chávez had rejected legislative solutions in the past by arguing that a truly successful union movement must be built from the ground up rather than rely on top-down activity. But Chávez began to reconsider this stand in light of the attacks by the Teamsters. Additionally, the time seemed right for a legislative program: Jerry Brown, long an avid supporter of the UFW, had been elected Governor of California in November 1974. Brown had even hired LeRoy Chatfield, a former high-level UFW staffer, as one of his key aides.

Once in office, however, Brown's support for the UFW cooled. The UFW knew it had to make a strong political showing in order to push Brown and the California State Legislature to act.

The UFW considered more mass picketing, more rallies, and more boycotts, but the union was worried that it had lost the support of farm workers and the public and that such events would point out the weakness of the union rather than its strength. Instead, the UFW settled on a 110-mile (180 km) march by a small group of UFW leaders from San Francisco to the E & J Gallo Winery in Modesto. The organizers envisioned a small but dramatic march that would not require large numbers of participants. Just a few hundred marchers left San Francisco on February 22, 1975. But more than 15,000 people joined them en route by the time they reached Modesto on March 1.

The spontaneous, spectacular success of the Modesto march garnered significant media attention, and proved that the UFW still had the support of farm workers.

== Legislative history of CALRA ==
The dramatic success of the Modesto march energized the farm labor movement in California. Governor Brown quickly began pushing for labor law reform. Grower resistance never emerged, as many employers were reluctant to continue the fight against the UFW. "The grape boycott scared the heck out of the farmers, all of us," said one major grower, and employers did not want another UFW boycott.

=== Previous legislative efforts ===
Several previous efforts to enact legislation protecting collective bargaining rights for farm workers had emerged in California between 1969 and 1975, but all had failed. César Chávez had briefly supported labor law reform in California in April 1969, and Conservative Republican State Senator George Murphy had sponsored a bill backed by Republicans and growers the same year to guarantee the right to organize, imposed secret-ballot elections, and restricted the right to strike and to engage in boycotts. But the Murphy bill, as well as a less restrictive bill in the State Assembly, died. Murphy introduced an even more restrictive bill in 1970, but that too failed.

The first positive sign for labor law reform came in 1971. An association of major growers agreed to support legislation which provided for recognition of farm worker unions in January 1971. The State Senate narrowly approved a bill opposed by the UFW, but the Assembly killed the measure. Based on the support for the growers in the State Senate, the growers backed a ballot measure, Proposition 22, which would have guaranteed the right to organize but placed heavy restrictions on the right to strike, boycott, and picket. California's then-Secretary of State, Jerry Brown, sued to have Proposition 22 removed from the ballot amid allegations of signature fraud on the approving petition, violation of child labor laws (children as young as six years old were alleged to have been paid to collect signatures), and bribery. The measure went down to defeat.

The next legislative push came in 1973. The American Farm Bureau Federation, the nation's largest association of farmers and a representative of many California growers, proposed amending the federal National Labor Relations Act to permit agricultural workers to organize. The change led California Governor Ronald Reagan to introduce a bill in the California state legislature that would permit agricultural field workers to unionize under secret ballot elections as well as ban secondary boycotts. But the state Assembly did not pass the bill. However, Jerry Brown—declaring that a "bloody civil war" existed in the Central Valley—came out in favor of a legislative solution in August 1973. Brown, a longtime labor attorney who had met César Chávez in 1968, had long supported the UFW and helped introduce UFW leaders to Hollywood stars, directors, and studio heads in order to help the union win critical support in the entertainment industry.

Brown's public support and his impending run for governor (which was widely anticipated) led Chávez to make a stronger push for labor law reform in 1974. Chávez and John F. Henning, Executive Secretary-Treasurer of the California Labor Federation (the state body of the AFL-CIO), wrote the bill and first-term Chicano Assemblyman Richard Alatorre (D-Los Angeles) introduced the bill. But Governor Ronald Reagan led opposition which killed the bill.

=== Passage ===
Jerry Brown's election as governor significantly improved the chances of passing a bill in 1975. Two of the 26 paragraphs of Brown's inaugural address were devoted to the need for farm labor legislation, Assembly Speaker Leo T. McCarthy voiced his support for the legislation.

The bill which would eventually become CALRA was introduced in both chambers of the state legislature on April 10, 1975. Top UFW staff member Dolores Huerta acted as the farm worker union's chief lobbyist. With McCarthy, some growers, and the UFW behind the bill, a key State Senate committee approved the bill on May 7. Key labor unions (including the Teamsters), arguing that card check rather than secret ballot elections should be the bill's preferred method of resolving unionization disputes, opposed the bill. Nonetheless, a key State Assembly committee approved it on May 12, despite attempts by some Teamster members to intimidate legislators into opposing the bill. The opposition was countered by the UFW, which held rallies to support the bill, and agreement was reached on May 19 on a compromise bill.

By that time, however, the deadline for passing a bill out of its chamber of origination had passed, and Governor Brown was forced to call a special session of the legislature to pass the farm labor bill. A Senate committee approved the bill on May 21, the full Senate passed the bill on May 26, two Assembly committees reported the bill on May 27, and the Assembly passed the bill and set it to Governor Brown for his signature on May 29. Just 50 calendar days were needed to pass the bill. Governor Brown signed the legislation into law on June 4, 1975.

== Structure of the Act ==
The Act defines agriculture to include farming (which includes cultivation and tillage of soil; dairy production; cultivation, growing, and harvesting of agricultural or horticultural commodities; raising livestock, bees, furbearing animals, or poultry; and/or forestry or lumbering operations), and includes all activities incidental to or in conjunction with agriculture (such as preparation for market, transportation, or storage). Employees are defined in the Act, but the definition excludes anyone engaged in construction, painting, building repair, or land moving operations unrelated to the preparation of land for cultivation.

The Act establishes a five-member Agricultural Labor Relations Board (ALRB), whose five-year terms are staggered so that one member's term ends on January 1 of each year. The ALRB must issue a written report on its activities to the Governor and Legislature each year, may establish officers or offices and delegate all or part of its authority to such on an as-needed basis, and has extensive investigatory, subpoena, and enforcement powers.

The Act defines unfair labor practices for both employers and labor unions. Section 1154 (d) of the Act bans strikes (including recognition strikes) by workers who have not selected an organization as their labor representative through the procedures outlined by the Act, but protects secondary picketing and publicity only if the labor union is the certified bargaining representative or has not lost an election at the worksite in the past 12 months and only if the publicity or picketing does not induce others to engage in strikes. Section 1154.5 explicitly bans hot cargo agreements. The Act also requires bargaining in good faith.

The Act outlines procedures similar to those of the National Labor Relations Act for electing a representative labor organization. Only secret ballot elections are permitted. The Board has the right to determine the correct bargaining unit, and an election is triggered only when a petition signed by a majority of current workers is presented. There are several bars to holding an election (including the existence of an existing certified labor organization, an election was held and lost within the previous 12 months, and an election was held but no contract executed within the previous 12 months).

To encourage the adoption of collective bargaining agreements, the Act (as amended) provides for the declaration of an impasse, mandatory and binding 30-day mediation and conciliation, review of the mediator's report, and court review of binding mediation. The Act contains a "make-whole" remedy for bad-faith bargaining intended to encourage employers to bargain in good faith. Under this provision, the ALRB can "take affirmative action including...making employees whole, when the Board deems such relief appropriate, for the loss of pay resulting from the employer's refusal to bargain".

== Implementation ==
Governor Brown nominated the ALRB's first five members (a Catholic bishop, a farmer, a member of La Raza Unida Party, a former UFW official, and a former Teamsters attorney) on June 23, 1975, just 18 days after signing the Act into law. The ALRB had an initial budget of $1.5 million ($6.46 million in 2009 inflation-adjusted dollars).

CALRA went into effect on August 28, 1975. Draft regulations governing the operation of the Board and secret ballot organizing elections were issued 10 days earlier, but did not address the controversial issue of whether union organizers would have access to the workplace (e.g., fields). The ALRB issued rules giving organizers access to fields on August 29, and the UFW filed for the first union elections under the Act on September 1. But a federal district court enjoined the Board from implementing its worksite access rules on September 3—putting a halt to some ballot-counting in several elections. By the end of the first week of elections, the UFW had won 22 bargaining units and the Teamsters 13, while growers had alleged the UFW had committed unfair labor practices in several elections. The California Supreme Court lifted the ban on union organizers in the fields on September 18, and the ALRB issued its first formal ULP complaints (against two growers) the next day.

The inexperience of the Board and its agents, the large number of court challenges to the new law, the large number of elections held, and the large number of alleged violations of the law led to significant delays in voting, ballot-counting, and enforcement. A special panel of attorneys and investigators was named by Governor Brown on October 4 to help alleviate the backlog, and strengthened penalties for anyone found guilty of committing a ULP were put in place on October 16 to help reduce the number of violations.

== Impact of the law ==
By the end of January 1976, the ALRB had received 604 election petitions, conducted 423 elections involving over 50,000 workers (80 percent of elections had objections filed), received 988 ULP charges, issued 254 citations for violations of the Act, and issued 27 decisions. Between 1975 and 1984, unions won 88 percent of all elections, but between 1984 and 2003 won less than 50 percent of elections. By 1994, however, two-thirds of all elections had been held in the Act's first three years, and since 1978 about half of all elections had been decertification elections.

Despite the large number of union elections, CALRA's effect on union membership seems mixed at best. Much of this evidence focuses on the UFW, assumed to be the prime beneficiary of the Act. Membership in the UFW fell from a high of more than 70,000–60,000 in 1972 to a low of 6,000–5,000 in 1974, but rose to just 18,000 by 1977. The Teamsters, however, had more than 55,000 farm worker members by 1977. The UFW had only six major collective bargaining agreements by 1994 (one vegetable grower, four citrus growers, one mushroom grower, and a host of small nurseries). However, one study concludes that mass importation and use of illegal immigrants—not flaws in CALRA—are holding down additional collective bargaining gains. Others conclude (on the basis of anecdotal evidence) that the Teamsters have signed sweetheart deals with perhaps as many as 375 growers, holding down membership gains for the UFW. Others criticize the ALRB for being politicized. Critics point to the change in the Board in 1980, when George Deukmejian, the new Republican governor of California, replaced the Brown board with allegedly pro-grower members, leading to low union confidence in the Board's impartiality and a severe decline in the number of election petitions brought before the board.

One outcome has been the end of jurisdictional warfare between the UFW and Teamsters. The UFW signed an agreement with the Teamsters in March 1977 in which the UFW agreed to seek to organize only those workers covered by CALRA, while the Teamsters agreed to organize all other agricultural workers. The agreement also led the UFW to end its boycott of lettuce, grapes, and wine in February 1978. UFW officials claimed the Teamsters were on the verge of losing a jurisdictional battle for 50,000 workers being decided by the ALRB, but at least one press report indicated that the scandal-scarred union wished to burnish its public image.

It is also not clear whether CALRA has had a beneficial effect on the Californian economy. One study concluded that the Act actually resulted in a net economic loss: Higher prices were being charged for produce, farm worker earnings and land values had actually dropped. However, another analysis has concluded that these economic effects are minimal compared to the reduction in poverty which has occurred.

The Act's "make-whole" provision has also come under scrutiny. Although the make-whole provision's goal is laudable, it is argued, the Board's decisions have led to litigation that lasts for years and mitigate the impact of any awards.

== Efforts at revision ==
A number of efforts to revise CALRA have been made over the years. The first significant effort came in 2000, when Democratic Governor Gray Davis vetoed an effort to expand CALRA's reach to stablehands at the state's horse racing tracks.

A major revision was enacted in 2002. A rising number of impasses in collective bargaining appeared to be frustrating the purpose of CALRA. The UFW backed two bills which would impose binding arbitration and mediation on unions and employers if an impasse was declared. The bills passed the state legislature in August 2002, and Governor Davis signed them into law in October. Growers filed suit in state court to have the amendments declared unconstitutional, but a state appeals court upheld the revisions in 2006.

Another attempt to revise the law in 2007 was also unsuccessful. The UFW backed a bill which would allow card check unionization, arguing that large majorities of workers signed union authorization cards but then were intimidated into voting against the union during the election process. The growers argued that the UFW was either duping or intimidating workers into signing union authorization cards, and that the secret ballot voting revealed the true feelings of workers. But the bill did not pass either chamber.
