= List of California state constitutional offices =

The following is a list of California state constitutional offices. Please see Constitution of the state of California for further details.

== Officers ==
These individuals (in the case of the Board of Equalization, its members) are specifically denominated by article V, section 14 and article III, section 8, of the Constitution as 'state officers', are generally elected, are restricted from receiving money from certain sources and have their salaries determined by the California Citizen's Compensation Commission. The Treasurer and Insurance Commissioner are not explicitly created by the Constitution, but are still generally considered constitutional officers and are named as state officers in the Constitution.

- Governor
- Lieutenant Governor, who is also the President of the California State Senate
- Secretary of State
- Controller
- Treasurer
- Attorney General
- Insurance Commissioner
- Superintendent of Public Instruction
- Members of the California State Board of Equalization
- Members of the California State Legislature

== Courts ==
The California courts of record were created by article VI, section 1 of the Constitution.

- Supreme Court of California
- California Courts of Appeal
- California superior courts

== Judicial commissions ==
These commissions were created by article VI of the Constitution to administer the judiciary.

- Judicial Council, article VI, section 6
- Commission on Judicial Appointments, article VI, section 7
- Commission on Judicial Performance, article VI, section 8

== Constitutional agencies ==
These offices and bodies were specifically created by the Constitution, but their members are not generally known as 'state officers'. However, their decisions are generally reviewable through both certiorari and administrative mandate and their a court's review of their factual findings is "limited to a determination whether those findings are supported by substantial evidence in light of the whole record" in deference to their limited judicial powers.

- Alcoholic Beverage Control Appeals Board, article XX, section 22
- Citizens Compensation Commission
- Citizens Redistricting Commission, article XXI, section 2
- Department of Alcoholic Beverage Control, article XX, section 22
- Public Utilities Commission, article XII, section 1
- State Board of Education, and county boards of education, article IX section 7
- State Personnel Board, article VII, section 2

== Public corporations ==
- California Institute for Regenerative Medicine, article XXXV, section 1
- State Bar of California, article VI, section 9
- University of California and its Board of Regents, article IX, section 9

== County officers ==
The Constitution requires the appointment of certain officers for counties in article XI, section 1.

- Board of supervisors, which shall also constitute the county board of equalization if it does not delegate these duties to a separate board
- Sheriff
- District attorney
- Assessor
