= California Unemployment Insurance Appeals Board =

U.S. quasi-judicial administrative court

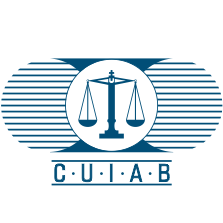
- Established: 1943
- Location: Various
- Composition method: Multiple individuals selecting
- Authorised by: California Unemployment Insurance Code § 401
- Appeals to: Superior Court
- Appeals from: Employment Development Department
- Judge term length: 4 years
- Website: cuiab.ca.gov

Marty Block
- Currently: Chair
- Lead position ends: January 1, 2023

The California Unemployment Insurance Appeals Board is a quasi-judicial administrative court in the U.S. state of California which hears appeals from determinations on unemployment insurance claims and taxes by the Employment Development Department. It is governed by a five-member Board, of which three are appointed by the Governor, one is appointed by the Speaker of the Assembly and one by the Senate President pro tempore. The Board was initially formed in 1943.

In the 2020-2021 fiscal year, CUIAB handled a total of 189,220 appeals, of which 180,163 were unemployment insurance appeals.

== Procedures ==
When an unemployment insurance claimant files an appeal regarding a determination that they have received from the Employment Development Department, the Board sets the case for hearing by an administrative law judge who takes testimony from the claimant as well as any other interested parties, such as the department or the claimant's former employer. If any party disagrees with the outcome of the appeal, they may file an appeal to the Board itself; the Board's determination is the final administrative level of appeal available, and appellants must then file a petition for writ of administrative mandate in the superior court in order to seek review.

While the Constitution of California and the Unemployment Insurance Code prohibits state courts from impeding the collection of a tax, this does not apply to reserve account charges based on an employee's status so long as an assessment of unemployment insurance taxes has not been made.
