= Robert Cervero =

Sustainable transportation author

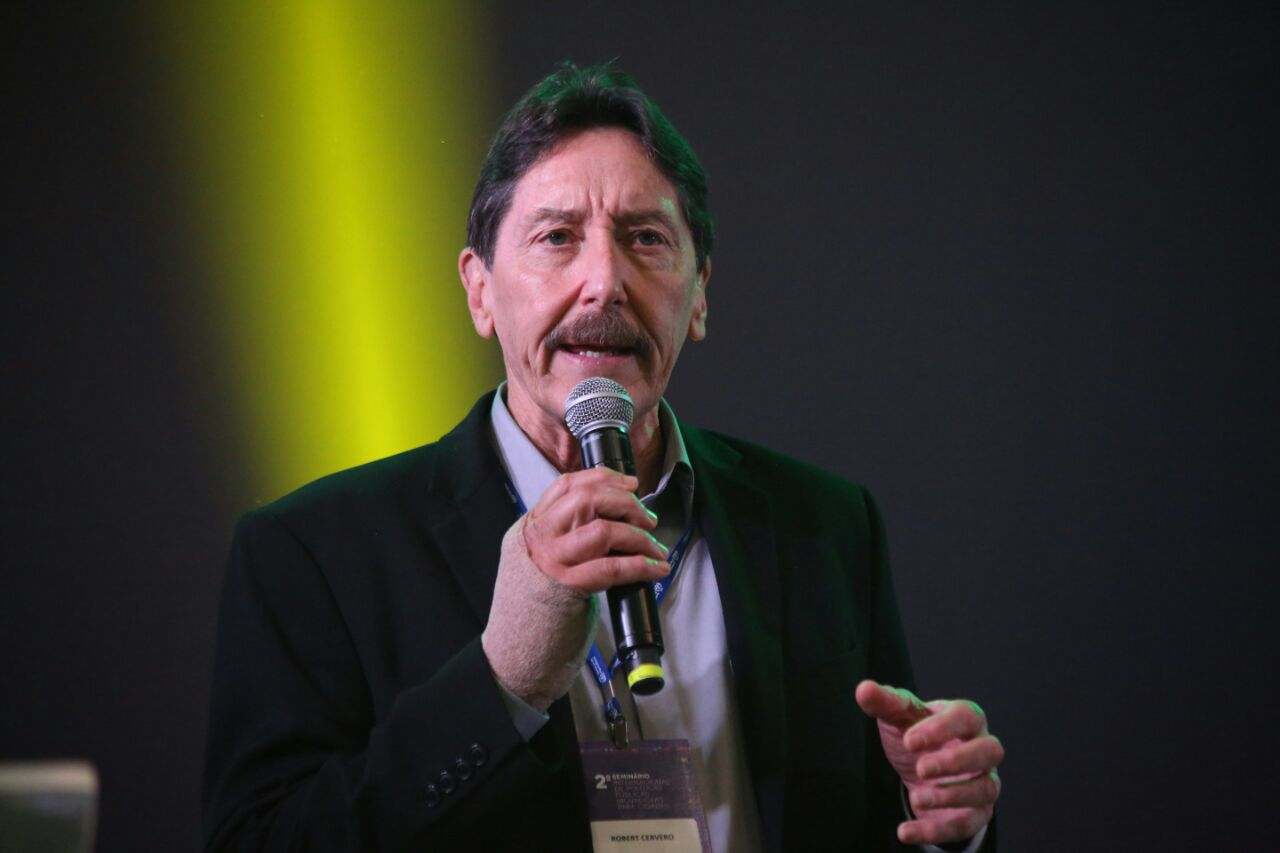
- Born: May 8, 1951 (age 75); Norfolk, Virginia
- Education: AB (University of North Carolina, 1973); MS and MCP (Georgia Institute of Technology, 1975); University of California, Los Angeles, 1980).
- Website: ced.berkeley.edu/people/robert-cervero

Robert Cervero is an author, consultant, and educator in sustainable transportation policy and planning. During his years as a faculty member in city and regional planning at the University of California, Berkeley, he gained recognition for his work in the sphere of urban transportation and land-use planning. His research has spanned the topics of induced demand, transit-oriented development (TOD), transit villages, paratransit, car sharing, and suburban growth.

== Academic and professional life ==
Currently professor emeritus of City and Regional Planning, Cervero twice chaired Berkeley's urban planning department and also served as director of two research units: the University of California Transportation Center (UCTC, 2009-2017) and the Institute of Urban and Regional Development (IURD, 2009-2014). He held Berkeley planning department's first distinguished chair appointment, the Carmel P. Friesen Chair in Urban Studies from 2011 to 2016. Among his books are Beyond Mobility (2017), Transforming Cities with Transit (2013), Informal Transport in the Developing World (2001), The Transit Metropolis (1998), Transit Villages in the 21st Century (1997), Paratransit in America (1997), America's Suburban Centers (1989) and Suburban Gridlock (1986). His research earned him the first-ever Dale Prize for Excellence in Urban Planning Research and the Hsue-shen Tsien Gold Medal award for the translated version of The Transit Metropolis. In 2013, UMB's Future Cities ranked him among the top 100 City Innovators Worldwide. Cervero twice received the Article of the Year Award from the Journal of the American Planning Association .

The work of Robert Cervero and others researching the link between transportation and urban form has not been without controversy. Most contentious has been the debate over whether built environments meaningfully influence travel behavior. Findings from a study led by Cervero on the influence of the Bay Area Rapid Transit (BART) system on the San Francisco Bay Area's urban development patterns were challenged on the grounds that BART provided few accessibility gains and built environments are largely unmalleable. Charging motorists more to reflect the environmental and congestion costs they imposed, it was countered, would significantly increase the land-use impacts of metro-rail investments like BART.

Cervero has been credited with "pioneering the use of the now-ubiquitous 'D' variables—density, diversity, and design—in explaining travel behavior." Research showing compact, mixed-use, pedestrian-friendly developments — e.g., neo-traditional and transit-oriented communities — are associated with automobile travel has been tempered by studies showing this is partly explained by self-selection (i.e., the predisposition of some residents moving into walkable, transit-oriented neighborhoods to drive less for lifestyle reasons). Disagreement exists over the relative importance of self-selection vis-à-vis built environments in explaining travel behavior. Methodological challenges in linking compact development to driving has further muddied the waters.

Transit-oriented development is yet another domain where scholars disagree about its transportation impacts. A 2016 issue of Planning magazine referred to Robert Cervero as "the world's top expert on transit-oriented development". Research by him and others has linked TOD to reduced car ownership and usage, and correspondingly high ridership levels among those living and working near transit. Paul Mees, among others, has argued that the quality of transit services is more important in drawing people out of cars and into trains and buses than the location or density of development. Such debates aside, others point to other reasons for advancing TOD including increasing housing choices, physical activity, and social interaction.

While UC Berkeley was home for much of his academic life, Cervero has had visiting academic and research appointments at a number of other universities and institutions, including: University of Cambridge (Churchill College, Overseas Fellow); Nanyang Technological University (SMRT Visiting Professor); NYU-Abu Dhabi (Visiting Professor); University College London (Visiting Professor); University of Pennsylvania (Faculty Fellow); King Saud University (Academic Expert); Tongji University; University of Melbourne; Universidade Federal Do Rio de Janeiro; Institute of Technology Bandung; Korean Research Institute for Human Settlements; Harvard Institute for International Development; Dortmund University; and Urban Land Institute (Fellow). He has also chaired the International Association of Urban Environments, served on the Advisory Board of the World Economic Forum's Future of Urban Development and was a contributing author to the IPCC (International Panel on Climate Change) Fifth Assessment (2014) and UN-Habitat's Global Report on Sustainable Urban Mobility (2013).

== Personal life ==
Cervero is married to Sophia Cervero and they have three children: Kristen, Christopher, and Alexandria. A guitarist and mellotronist, Cervero has chronicled the music of the prog-rock band King Crimson as a collector of rare live recordings, anniversary parties, and listening parties of unreleased music (posted on Elephant Talk), and a tribute to mellotrons.

In the early 2000s, Cervero got involved with the Active Living movement, serving as chair of the National Advisory Committee of the Active Living Research (ALR) program for more than decade. This affiliation with active-living research prompted him to become more physically active himself. In his fifties to mid-sixties, he averaged a marathon or ultramarathon a month, run mostly on trails. Running and active living extended into his transportation research as well, including involvement in several National Academy projects and research on "Running to Work".

== Books ==
- Beyond Mobility: Planning Cities for People and Places. Washington, D.C., Island Press, 2017; with E. Guerra and S. Als.
- Suburban Gridlock II. New Brunswick, New Jersey: Transaction Publishers, 2013 (re-release with a new introduction)
- Transforming Cities with Transit. Washington, D.C.: World Bank, 2013; with H. Suzuki and K. Iuchi; http://www.scribd.com/doc/119380943/Transforming-Cities-with-Transit
- Developing Around Transit: Strategies and Solutions That Work. Washington, D.C.: Urban Land Institute, 2004; with R. Dunphy, F. Dock, M. McAvery, D. Porter, and C. Swenson.
- Informal Transport in the Developing World, Nairobi, Kenya: UN Habitat, 2000.
- The Transit Metropolis: A Global Inquiry, Washington, DC: Island Press, 1998; translated into Chinese, China Architecture and Building Press, 2007.
- Paratransit in America: Redefining Mass Transportation. Westport, CT: Praeger, 1997.
- Transit Villages in the 21st Century. New York: McGraw-Hill, 1997; with M. Bernick.
- America's Suburban Centers: The Land Use-Transportation Link. Boston: Unwin-Hyman, 1989.
- Suburban Gridlock. New Brunswick, New Jersey: Center for Urban Policy Research, Rutgers University Press, 1986.
