= California Agricultural Labor Relations Board =

California state government agency

Agricultural Labor Relations Board
Board overview
- Jurisdiction: California
- Board executive: Genevieve A. Shiroma, chair
- Parent board: Labor and Workforce Development Agency
- Key document: California Agricultural Labor Relations Act
- Website: www.alrb.ca.gov

The Agricultural Labor Relations Board (ALRB) is an agency of the California state government that administers the California Agricultural Labor Relations Act, which establishes collective bargaining for farmworkers in the state. The ALRB has two functions: To conduct, oversee, and certify representation elections, and to investigate unfair labor practice (ULP) charges and pursue remedies. Administrative law judges and agency staff adjudicate most cases, with the five-member Board serving as a final arbiter. The ALRB is overseen by the California Labor and Workforce Development Agency.

== Gerawan Farming Union De-certification Dispute ==
In 2013, farmworkers for Gerawan Farming, one of California's largest fruit growers requested the ALRB to supervise an election to decertify the United Farm Workers as their representative, citing the union's failure to act in their interests. ALRB attorneys tried to prevent the decertification elections from taking place. A California state assemblyman representing the Central Valley area accused the ARLB of being a “rogue agency” that is “out of control.” The ALRB's regional director tried to prevent the workers from voting, leading workers to sue the ALRB to force agency to permit them to choose whether or not to be represented by the UFW.

The three-member ALRB ordered its legal team to permit the vote to proceed. After the vote, held on November 5, 2013, the ALRB general counsel prevented the farm workers’ votes from being counted, citing alleged irregularities and employer intimidation. The general counsel backed the ALRB regional director's move to lock the workers' ballots in a safe and did not count the votes. In 2014, a federal court gave the go-ahead for a farm worker to proceed with a lawsuit against the ALRB, for violating the workers’ Constitutional rights.

In May 2014, the ALRB stated that it had no “timetable” for counting the votes, and later began proceedings to destroy the ballots before it could investigate the allegations it raised. News organizations cited the unusual slowness in the investigation, with a lead financial news service suspecting the general counsel's reluctance to count worker ballots that would reject the UFW.

The ALRB's own in-house administrative law judge ruled on September 16, 2015, that the workers' ballots should remain uncounted and should be destroyed.

In May, 2015, a three-judge panel of the California Court of Appeal ruled that ALRB violated the law and the "equal protection principles of the U.S. Constitution by seeking to impose a contract on farm employers and workers. After an unsuccessful appeal attempt, the ALRB was eventually forced to count the votes in the Gerawan case, with the result of a "No Union" vote.
