= Employment Development Department =

Department of government in California

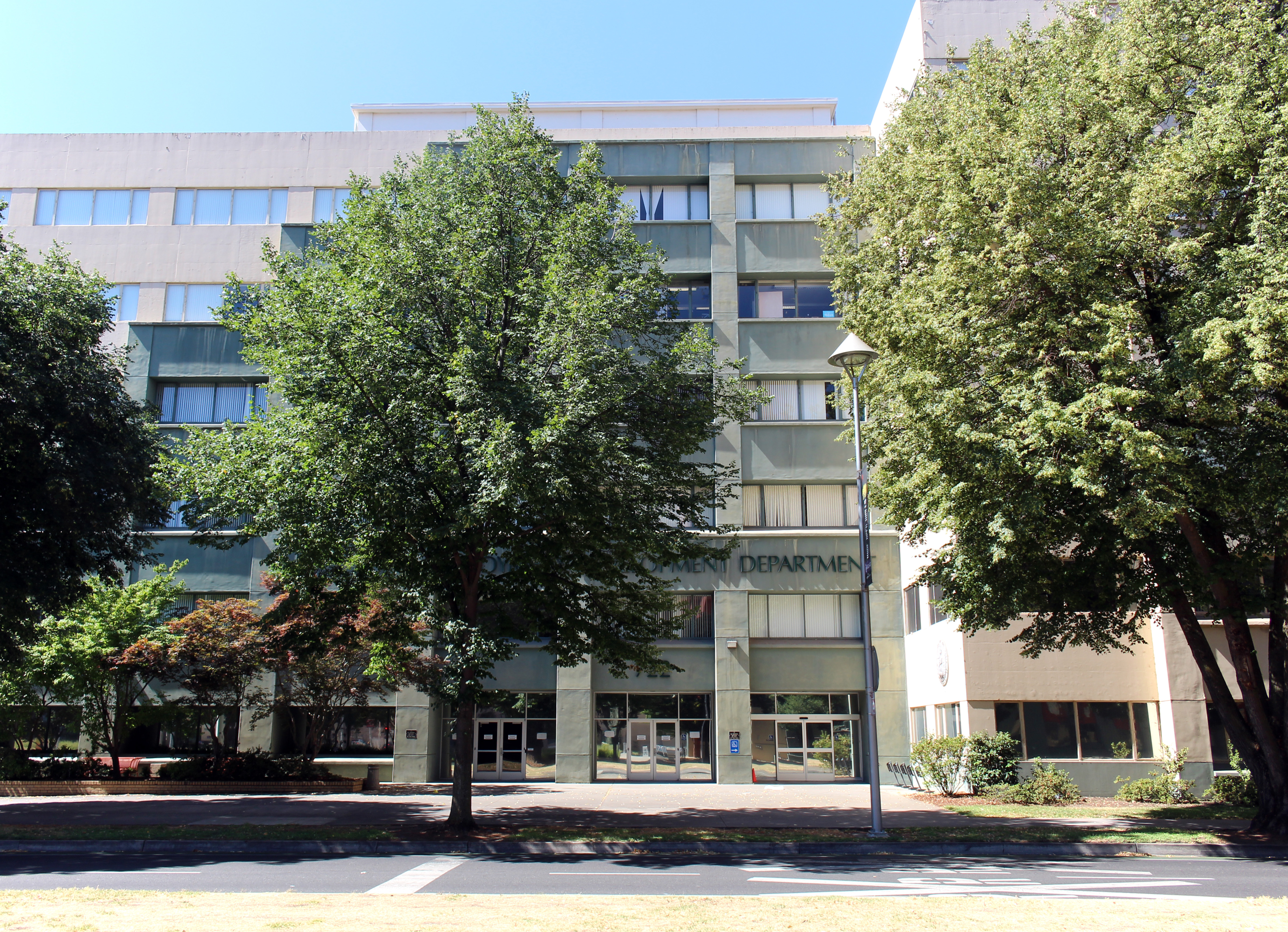
- Agency headquarters at 722 Capitol Mall in Sacramento

Agency overview
- Formed: 1935, as the Department of Employment
- Type: Public employment service, unemployment insurance and payroll tax agency
- Headquarters: 722 Capitol Mall, Sacramento, California
- Employees: approximately 10,000
- Annual budget: US$ 882 million (2018–2019)
- Parent agency: California Labor and Workforce Development Agency
- Website: www.edd.ca.gov

In California, the Employment Development Department (EDD) is a department of the state government that administers Unemployment Insurance (UI), Disability Insurance (DI), and Paid Family Leave (PFL) programs. The department also provides employment service programs and collects the state's labor market information and employment data. EDD is one of California's three major taxation agencies, alongside California Department of Tax and Fee Administration and the Franchise Tax Board. In addition to collecting unemployment insurance taxes, the department administers the reporting, collection, and enforcement of the state's payroll taxes.

== History ==
The Legislature created the Department of Employment as part of the Unemployment Reserves Act in 1935. The act (Statutes 1935, chapter 352) was set up to provide "a (monetary) reserve to assist in protecting the public against the social effects of unemployment." The purpose of the department was to operate a statewide system of employment agencies and distribute the payment of unemployment insurance to eligible unemployed workers.

The employment agencies were an existing legacy program launched by the Legislature in 1915 to match unemployed job seekers with employers; they were briefly part of the Department of Industrial Relations (created in 1927) before the Department of Employment was created.

As part of Governor Reagan's Reorganization Plan of 1968, the Department of Employment was placed under the Human Relations Agency. With the signing of chapter 1460 that same year, the department became the Department of Human Resources Development, which assumed the duties, purposes, responsibility, and jurisdiction of the former department. The name of the department was again changed in 1974 (chapter 1212), when it became the Employment Development Department.

In 2020, during the COVID-19 pandemic, the system of unemployment benefits was expanded in such a way that it enabled self-employed people to get weekly checks. Few safeguards were in place to prevent ineligible people from getting these checks. This led to massive fraud, reaching around $20 billion, "perhaps the largest fraud wave in history".

== Programs ==
Unemployment Insurance (UI) is a federal-state program created to provide partial wage replacement to unemployed workers while they conduct an active search for new work.

The UI program benefits the individual and the local community. For the most part, UI benefits are spent in the local community, which helps sustain the economic well-being of local businesses. The UI program pays benefits to workers who have lost their job and meet the program's eligibility requirements.

== Organization ==
=== Branches ===
The Administration Branch provides administrative support to the department, including providing business operations planning and support services, human resource services for EDD employees, and accounting for the department's annual budget.

The Disability Insurance Branch has over 1,200 employees organized into a Central Office; a Field Operations Division (with Claims Management Offices and Customer Service Centers); and an Office of the Medical Director. The Branch administers the State Disability Insurance program (which includes Disability Insurance and Paid Family Leave), as well as Non-Industrial Disability Insurance. Among other initiatives, by 2011 the Branch plans to implement a Disability Insurance Automation project for more efficient and effective electronic communications and information processing. The state's legal and regulatory requirements for the Branch's programs are found in the California Unemployment Insurance Code, the California Labor Code, and Title 22 of the California Code of Regulations.

The Information Technology Branch is responsible for automation planning, policy, development, maintenance, support, operations, and oversight of automation systems within the department. The branch provides data processing technical support and services for one of the largest information technology environments in State government, including the planning, development, maintenance, installation, and support of telecommunications systems such as cabling, voice, and data equipment.

The Policy, Accountability, and Compliance Branch performs review oversight and technical assistance functions for the director, EDD's executive staff, and state and local EDD program management. The Branch is responsible for fraud detection and deterrence "through sound internal control structures, internal and external audits, risk assessments, detailed Quality Control reviews, and criminal investigations".

The Public Affairs Branch provides outreach, marketing services, communications, and training that support EDD programs and the employment of special targeted populations. The branch is composed of the Marketing and Constituent Services Office, the Communications Office and the Web Content and Usability Group.

The Tax Branch, one of the largest tax collection agencies in the nation, handles all administrative, education, customer service, and enforcement functions for the audit and collection of Unemployment Insurance Tax, Employment Training Tax, State Disability Insurance Tax, and Personal Income Tax withholding. Unemployment Insurance Tax and Employment Training Tax are employer contributions, while State Disability Insurance Tax and Personal Income Tax are withheld from employees' wages. Each year, EDD collects more than $85 billion in payroll taxes, including nearly $71 billion in Personal Income Tax, processes more than 50 million employer payroll tax documents and remittances, and maintains records for more than 19 million workers.

The Workforce Services Branch includes several major programs. The Branch administers the federal Worker Adjustment and Retraining Notification Act (WARN Act) and the California law that expands upon the WARN Act.

== See also ==
- Civil rights
- Civil Rights Act (disambiguation)
- Department of Fair Employment and Housing
- Equal Employment Opportunity Commission
- Government of California
- Workforce Investment Board
