= Children's Health Insurance Program =

Health Insurance program for families administered by the United States

Overview: Children's Health Insurance Program (CHIP)
- Functional Definition
- CHIP is a joint federal and state program providing low-cost health insurance to children. It targets families who earn too much money to qualify for Medicaid, but who cannot afford to buy private health insurance on their own.
- Core Mechanisms
- Funding Structure: Shared by federal and state governments. The federal government matches state spending at a higher rate than it does for regular Medicaid.
- Administration: States design and run their own unique CHIP programs within broad federal guidelines. Programs can be run as an extension of Medicaid, a separate program, or a mix of both.
- Eligibility Focus: Primarily uninsured children up to age 19. In some states, the program also covers pregnant women.
- Standard Covered Services
- Routine doctor checkups and immunizations (vaccines).; Dental, vision, and hearing care.; Prescriptions, emergency services, and hospital care.; Laboratory tests and X-rays.
- Use this talk page to discuss improvements to the article text, legislative history, and program funding data.

Logo of the Department of Health and Human Services

The Children's Health Insurance Program (CHIP), formerly known as the State Children's Health Insurance Program (SCHIP), is a program administered by the United States Department of Health and Human Services that provides matching funds to states for health insurance to families with children. The program was designed to cover uninsured children in families with incomes that are modest but too high to qualify for Medicaid. The program was passed into law as part of the Balanced Budget Act of 1997, and the statutory authority for CHIP is under title XXI of the Social Security Act.

CHIP was formulated in the aftermath of the failure of President Bill Clinton's comprehensive health care reform proposal. First Lady Hillary Clinton's brainchild in the aftermath of the failing of passage of her healthcare reform work, this Legislation to create CHIP was co-sponsored by Democratic senator Ted Kennedy and Republican senator Orrin Hatch. Despite opposition from some conservatives, SCHIP was included in the Balanced Budget Act of 1997, which President Clinton signed into law in August 1997. At the time of its creation, SCHIP represented the largest expansion of taxpayer-funded health insurance coverage for children in the U.S. since the establishment of Medicaid in 1965. The Children's Health Insurance Reauthorization Act of 2009 extended CHIP and expanded the program to cover an additional 4 million children and pregnant women, and the Bipartisan Budget Act of 2018 extended CHIP's authorization through 2027.

CHIP was designed as a federal-state partnership similar to Medicaid; programs are run by the individual states according to requirements set by the federal Centers for Medicare & Medicaid Services. States are given flexibility in designing their CHIP policies within broad federal guidelines, resulting in variations regarding eligibility, benefits, and administration across different states. Many states contract with private companies to administer some portions of their CHIP benefits. Some states have received authority to use CHIP funds to cover certain adults, including pregnant women and parents of children receiving benefits from both CHIP and Medicaid.

CHIP covered 7.7 million children during federal fiscal year 2010, and every state has an approved plan. Nonetheless, the number of uninsured children continued to rise after 1997, particularly among families that did not qualify for CHIP. An October 2007 study by the Vimo Research Group found that 68.7 percent of newly uninsured children were in families whose incomes were 200 percent of the federal poverty level or higher as more employers dropped dependents or dropped coverage altogether due to annual premiums nearly doubling between 2000 and 2006. A 2007 study from researchers at Brigham Young University and Arizona State found that children who drop out of CHIP cost their states more money due to the increased use of emergency care. A 2018 survey of the existing research noted that the availability of "CHIP coverage for children has led to improvements in access to health care and to improvements in health over both the short-run and the long-run."

== History ==
The Children's Health Insurance Program grew out of years of work in the U.S. Congress to improve Americans' health coverage. Almost a decade prior, the U.S. Bipartisan Commission on Comprehensive Health Care was formed in 1989 and charged with recommending "legislative action to ensure coverage for all Americans." The commission, renamed the Pepper Commission in honor of its creator and first chair Representative Claude Pepper (D-Fla.), laid out a blueprint to achieve universal coverage. Given the challenges of comprehensive health reform, Governor Jay Rockefeller, who was elected chair following Rep. Pepper's death, emphasized his commitment to pursue legislative action not only on the commission's full set of recommendations but also on a "down payment"—to expand public health coverage immediately for children and pregnant women, consistent with the principles the commission put forward. The legislation would guarantee public insurance coverage through Medicaid for every American child living in poverty and offset the cost of the improvements by doubling the federal excise tax on cigarettes.

Quickly after his election in 1992, President Bill Clinton assembled a task force to write a comprehensive health reform bill, and he worked with Congress to introduce the Health Security Act (HSA) in November 1993. It included provisions such as universal coverage and a basic benefit package, health insurance reform, and consumer choice of health plans.

After the HSA failed in the fall of 1994, congressional leaders and the administration recognized the need for an incremental, bipartisan approach to health care reform. Senator Jay Rockefeller continued to argue for expanded coverage for children. He referenced an amendment for accelerated coverage children and pregnant women offered during the Senate Finance Committee's health care reform markup that was adopted by a bipartisan majority of 12 to 8 as evidence that there was bipartisan support to provide assistance to children. He also went on to say expanding coverage for children was essential to reforming the welfare system to "prevent families from having to go and off welfare to qualify for Medicaid."

The 1996 Bipartisan Budget Agreement made net reductions in federal Medicaid spending over a five-year period but anticipated an additional $16 billion in spending on children's health care over the same period. However, it did not provide details on how that money would be spent. In 1997, several members of Congress introduced bills to cover uninsured children using that $16 billion, and the two most popular proposals were the Chafee-Rockefeller proposal and the Kennedy-Hatch proposal.

Senator Ted Kennedy, Chairman of the Senate Committee on Health, Education, Labor, and Pensions (HELP) was intrigued by a children's health insurance plan in Massachusetts that had passed in 1996, and met with a Boston Medical Center pediatrics director and a Massachusetts state legislator to discuss the feasibility of a national initiative. Kennedy also saw using an increase in tobacco taxes as a way to pay for the expanded coverage. Thus, in October 1996, Kennedy introduced a bill to provide health care coverage for children of the working poor, to be financed via a 75 cents a pack cigarette tax increase.

Kennedy brought Republican senator Orrin Hatch onto the legislation as a co-sponsor. Kennedy and Hatch had worked together as an "odd couple" in the Senate before, and here Hatch said that "Children are being terribly hurt and perhaps scarred for the rest of their lives" and that "as a nation, as a society, we have a moral responsibility" to provide coverage. Hatch's role would infuriate some Republican colleagues and conservative commentators.

On April 8, 1997, Senators Kennedy and Hatch introduced S. 525, the "Child Health Insurance and Lower Deficit Act (CHILD). This legislation amended the Public Health Service Act to create a new grant program for states to purchase private health insurance for children. It proposed to raise $30 billion over 5 years by raising the tobacco tax with $20 billion going to expanded coverage for children under a block grant approach and $10 billion for deficit reduction. S. 525 was referred to the Senate Health Education Labor and Pensions (HELP) Committee. Hearings were held on the bill in the HELP Committee but legislation to expand coverage for children was never acted on in the HELP Committee.

On April 30, 1997, senators John Chafee (R-RI) and Jay Rockefeller (D-WVa.) introduced S. 674, a bill to amend title XIX of the Social Security Act "to expand health coverage of low income children and pregnant women and to provide funds to promote outreach efforts to enroll eligible children." On the same day, Representative John Dingell (D-MI) introduced an identical bipartisan companion bill in the House of Representatives with Republican cosponsor, Representative Margaret Scafati Roukema (R-NJ).

Meanwhile, in December 1996 First Lady Hillary Rodham Clinton examined several possible initiatives and decided expanding health care insurance to children who had none was the one to advance, especially as its focus on children would be politically popular. This had precedents from earlier in the Clinton administration: a different variant of this approach, dubbed "Kids First", had been envisioned as a backup plan during the original 1993 Task Force on National Health Care Reform meetings. Additionally, Hillary Clinton had discussed an SCHIP-like program with a White House health policy coordinator during the time her full-blown health care plan had suffered political failure.

The new initiative was proposed at Bill Clinton's January 1997 State of the Union address, with the stated goal of coverage up to five million children. Kennedy continued to write much of the bill, using the increase in tobacco taxes to pay the $20 billion price tag. In March 1997, Kennedy brought Republican Senator Orrin Hatch onto the legislation as co-sponsor; Kennedy and Hatch had worked together as an "odd couple" in the Senate before, and here Hatch said that "Children are being terribly hurt and perhaps scarred for the rest of their lives" and that "as a nation, as a society, we have a moral responsibility" to provide coverage. Hatch's role would infuriate some Republican colleagues and conservative commentators. The First Lady did not hold news conferences or testify before Congress on behalf of the bill.

An initial objection of Republicans in the Senate was that proposing to pay for the services by raising the federal tax on cigarettes, from 24 cents a pack to 67 cents a pack, ignored the likely consequence that sale of tobacco products would decrease and tax revenues would increasingly fall short of those needed to pay for the expansion of benefits. Kennedy and Hatch scoffed at the objection, with the former saying, "If we can keep people healthy and stop them from dying, I think most Americans would say 'Amen; isn't that a great result?' If fewer people smoke, states will save far more in lower health costs than they will lose in revenues from the cigarette tax." Republicans also criticized the bill as an open-ended entitlement program, although it was structured as a block grant rather than an entitlement; Senate Majority Leader Trent Lott was an early opponent of the measure, calling it a "big-government program" that would not pass.

Pressure was on to reduce the amount of grants involved, with $16 billion a possible compromise; Hillary Clinton instead argued for $24 billion. The Clinton administration had a deal with the Republican leadership in Congress that forbade the administration from backing any amendments to the budget resolution. On May 22, it was so done, with the necessary cigarette tax amendment defeated by a 55–45 margin. but Kennedy was surprised and angered by it, considering it a betrayal, and saying that his calls to Bill Clinton and Vice President Al Gore had not been returned. Hatch was also upset, saying that Lott may have been bluffing and that, "I think the President and the people in the White House caved here."

Kennedy did not give up on the measure, saying: "We shall offer it again and again until we prevail. It's more important to protect children than to protect the tobacco industry." Both Bill and Hillary Clinton argued for including the children's health insurance in subsequent legislation. The bill was indeed revived by Kennedy and Hatch a month after its initial defeat. Organizations from the Children's Defense Fund to the Girl Scouts of the USA lobbied for its passage, putting public pressure on Congress; Kennedy urged Clinton to use her influence within the White House. SCHIP was then passed and signed into law by Bill Clinton on August 5, 1997, as part of the Balanced Budget Act of 1997, to take effect the following month. At a press conference following the signing, Kennedy thanked Hatch, Senate Minority Leader Tom Daschle, Children's Defense Fund head Marian Wright Edelman, Bill Clinton, and Hillary Clinton. About the last, Kennedy said, "Mrs. Clinton ... was of invaluable help, both in the fashioning and the shaping of the program and also as a clear advocate."

CHIP is located at Title IV, subtitle J of H.R. 2015 [105th] Balanced Budget Act of 1997. H.R. 2015 was introduced and sponsored by Rep John Kasich [R-OH] with no cosponsors. On 25 June 1997, H.R. 2015 passed House Vote Roll #241 mainly among partisan lines, 270 ayes and 162 nays, with most Democrats in the House of Representatives in opposition. On the same day, the bill passed in the Senate, with a substitute amendment, by unanimous consent. After a conference between the House and Senate, passage in both House (Roll #345: 346–85) and Senate (Roll #209: 85–15) on the conference substitute became more bipartisan.

== State administration ==
Like Medicaid, CHIP is a partnership between federal and state governments. The programs are run by the individual states according to requirements set by the federal Centers for Medicare & Medicaid Services. States may design their CHIP programs as an independent program separate from Medicaid (separate child health programs), use CHIP funds to expand their Medicaid program (CHIP Medicaid expansion programs), or combine these approaches (CHIP combination programs). States receive enhanced federal funds for their CHIP programs at a rate above the regular Medicaid match.

By February 1999, 47 states had set up CHIP programs, but it took effort to get children enrolled. That month, the Clinton administration launched the "Insure Kids Now" campaign, designed to get more children enrolled; the campaign would fall under the aegis of the Health Resources and Services Administration. By April 1999, some 1 million children had been enrolled, and the Clinton administration set a goal of raising the figure to 2.5 million by 2000.

States with separate child health programs follow the regulations described in Section 42 of the Code of Federal Regulations, Section 457. Separate child health programs have much more flexibility than Medicaid programs. Separate programs can impose cost sharing, tailor their benefit packages, and employ a great deal of flexibility in eligibility and enrollment matters. The limits to this flexibility are described in the regulations, and states must describe their program characteristics in their CHIP state plans. Out of 50 state governors, 43 support CHIP renewal. Some states have incorporated the use of private companies to administer portions of their CHIP benefits. These programs, typically referred to as Medicaid managed care, allow private insurance companies or health maintenance organizations to contract directly with a state Medicaid department at a fixed price per enrollee. The health plans then enroll eligible individuals into their programs and become responsible for assuring CHIP benefits are delivered to eligible beneficiaries.

In Ohio, CHIP funds are used to expand eligibility for the state's Medicaid program. Thus all Medicaid rules and regulations (including cost sharing and benefits) apply. Children from birth through age 18 who live in families with incomes above the Medicaid thresholds in 1996 and up to 200% of the federal poverty level are eligible for the CHIP Medicaid expansion program. In 2008, the maximum annual income needed for a family of four to fall within 100% of the federal poverty guidelines was $21,200, while 200% of the poverty guidelines was $42,400.

Other states have similar CHIP guidelines, with some states being more generous or restrictive in the number of children they allow into the program. With the exception of Alaska, Idaho, North Dakota and Oklahoma, all states have a minimum threshold for coverage at 200% of the federal poverty guidelines. CHIP Medicaid expansion programs typically use the same names for the expansion and Medicaid programs. Separate child health programs typically have different names for their programs. A few states also call the CHIP program by the term "Children's Health Insurance Program" (CHIP).

States are allowed to use Medicaid and CHIP funds for premium assistance programs that help eligible individuals purchase private health insurance. As of 2008 relatively few states had premium assistance programs, and enrollment was relatively low. Interest in this approach remained high, however.

In August 2007, the Bush Administration announced a rule requiring states (as of August 2008) to sign up 95% of families with children earning 200% of the federal poverty level, before using the funds to serve families earning more than 250% of the federal poverty level. The federal government said that 9 out the 17 states that offer benefits to higher-earning families were already compliant. Opponents of this rule argued that signing up higher-income families makes lower-income families more likely to sign up, and that the rule was incompassionate toward children who would otherwise go without medical insurance.

=== Implementations ===
- California: California Healthy Families Program (defunct)
- Utah: State Children's Health Insurance Program in Utah

== Eligibility for CHIP ==
Children up to the age of 19 from families with incomes too high for Medicaid but below 200% to 300% of the federal poverty level (FPL) are typically eligible for CHIP. The exact income requirements can vary from state to state. Additionally, a child must be a U.S. citizen, a U.S. national, or have a qualified immigration status to be eligible.

== Impact ==
A 2018 survey of the existing research noted that the availability of "CHIP coverage for children has led to improvements in access to health care and to improvements in health over both the short-run and the long-run."

In 2007, researchers from Brigham Young University and Arizona State found that children who drop out of CHIP cost states more money because they shift away from routine care to more frequent emergency care situations. The conclusion of the study is that an attempt to cut the costs of a state healthcare program could create a false savings because other government organizations pick up the tab for the children who lose insurance coverage and later need care.

In a 2007 analysis by the Congressional Budget Office, researchers determined that "for every 100 children who gain coverage as a result of CHIP, there is a corresponding reduction in private coverage of between 25 and 50 children." The CBO speculates this is because the state programs offer better benefits at lower cost to enrollees than the private alternatives. A briefing paper by libertarian think-tank Cato Institute estimated the "crowding out" of private insurers by the public program could be as much as 60%.

== Reauthorization ==
SCHIP was created in 1997 as a ten-year program; to continue past federal fiscal year 2007, passage of a reauthorization bill was required. The first two reauthorization bills to pass through Congress would also expand the program's scope; President George W. Bush vetoed them as improper expansions. A two-year reauthorization bill was signed into law by the President in December 2007 that would merely extend current CHIP services without expanding any portion of the program. With the 2008 Presidential and Congressional elections giving Democrats control of the Oval Office as well as expanded majorities in both houses of Congress, CHIP was reauthorized and expanded in the same bill through fiscal year 2013.

=== 2007 reauthorization ===
==== HR 976 ====
In 2007, both houses of Congress passed a bipartisan measure to expand the CHIP program, H.R. 976. The measure would have expanded coverage to over 4 million more participants by 2012, while phasing out most state expansions in the program that include any adults other than pregnant women. The bill called for a budget increase for five years totaling $35 billion, increasing total CHIP spending to $60 billion for the five-year period. Opposition to HR 976 focused on the $35 billion increase in government health insurance as well as $6.5 billion in Medicaid benefits to illegal immigrants. Originally intended to provide health care coverage to low-income children, HR 976 was criticized as a giveaway that would have benefited adults as well as non-U.S. citizens. The program expansion was to have been funded by sharply increasing federal excise taxes on tobacco products. On the other hand, opponents said this proposed expansion was for families with annual incomes up to $82,600 (400 percent of the federal poverty level)

On October 3, 2007, President Bush vetoed the bill, stating that he believed it would "federalize health care", expanding the scope of CHIP much farther than its original intent. The veto was the fourth of his administration. After his veto, Bush said he was open to a compromise that would entail more than the $5 billion originally budgeted, but would not agree to any proposal drastically expanding the number of children eligible for coverage.

On October 18, 2007, the House of Representatives fell 13 votes short (273–156) of the two-thirds majority required to override the president's veto, although 44 Republicans joined 229 Democrats in supporting the measure.

==== HR 3963 ====
Within a week of the failed veto override vote, the House passed a second bill attempting a similar expansion of CHIP. According to Democrats, the second bill, H.R. 3963, created firmer caps on income eligibility, prevented adults from joining, and banned children of illegal immigrants from receiving benefits. According to its opponents, however, this second proposed expansion was for families with annual incomes up to $62,000 (300 percent of the federal poverty level). The Senate passed the measure on November 1, 2007, but on December 12, 2007, Bush vetoed this bill as well, saying it was "essentially identical" to the earlier legislation, and a House vote in January 2008 failed to override the veto.

Pub. L. 110–173 (text) (PDF) was signed into law on December 21, 2007, extending CHIP funding through March 31, 2009.

The reauthorization bill also changed the program's name from "SCHIP" to simply "CHIP".

=== 2009 reauthorization ===
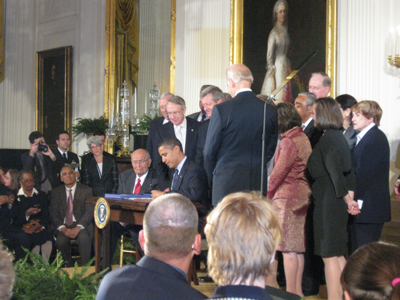
Signing ceremony for the reauthorization

In the wake of President Barack Obama's inauguration and the Democrats' increased majorities in both houses of Congress, legislative leaders moved quickly to break the political stalemate over CHIP expansion. On January 14, 2009, the House passed H.R. 2 on a vote of 290–138. The bill authorized spending and added $32.8 billion to expand the health coverage program to include about 4 million more children, including coverage of legal immigrants with no waiting period for the first time. A cigarette tax increase of 62 cents—bringing the total tax on a pack of cigarettes to $1.01—an increase of tax on chewing tobacco from $0.195/lb. to $0.50/lb.—as well as tax increases on other tobacco products was proposed as a funding source for the program's expansion. On January 29, the Senate passed the House bill by a 66–32 margin, with two amendments. The House accepted the amended version on a vote of 290 to 135, and President Obama signed the bill into law as Pub. L. 111–3 (text) (PDF) on February 4, 2009.

=== 2010 funding via Patient Protection and Affordable Care Act ===
The 2010 passage and signing of the Patient Protection and Affordable Care Act included funding for CHIP through 2015.

=== 2015 reauthorization ===
In 2015, Congress passed the Medicare Access and CHIP Reauthorization Act of 2015 (MACRA), and it was signed by President Obama.

=== 2017 expiration and 2018 reauthorization ===
CHIP expired on September 30, 2017. At the time, most states had sufficient funds to keep the program running for a period of months.

On September 18, 2017, Senators Orrin Hatch and Ron Wyden introduced the Keeping Kids' Insurance Dependable and Secure (KIDS) Act (Bill S.1827), which would fund CHIP until 2022. On November 3, 2017, the House of Representatives passed the CHAMPION Act, which also would fund CHIP until 2022.

Representative Terri Sewell speaks about the need to re-authorize CHIP in January 2018.

On January 22, 2018, President Trump signed legislation that reauthorized CHIP for six years. Bill H.195 (known as the Federal Register Printing Savings Act of 2017, including Extension of Continuing Appropriations Act, 2018) passed the House by a vote of 266-150 and passed the Senate a vote of 81–18. Fifteen Senate Democrats and 144 House Democrats voted against the bill because they objected to ending a three-day government shutdown without legally enshrining the DACA program for certain undocumented immigrants.

On February 9, 2018, Congress passed the Bipartisan Budget Act of 2018, which reauthorized CHIP for an additional four years. The bill was passed by vote of 71–28 in the Senate and by a vote of 240–186 in the House of Representatives. President Trump signed the bill into law that same day, allowing for CHIP's extension through 2027.

== See also ==
- Cigarette taxes in the United States
- Graeme Frost
- Health insurance in the United States
- PeachCare
- TexCare
