= Weekly Democratic Address =

Weekly event of the U.S. Democratic Party

The Weekly Democratic Address was delivered by a different prominent Democrat each week, in response to the weekly address of the president of the United States during a Republican presidency. When a Democrat has held the presidency, the President delivers the weekly address, such as occurred during 2009–2017 under Barack Obama.

== George W. Bush ==
=== 2001 Weekly Democratic Address speakers ===
Republican President George W. Bush was inaugurated on January 20. While Democrats held a majority in the Senate until Inauguration Day, Republicans received a majority of seats in both the House and Senate following the inauguration.

| Date | Speakers | State | Position | Notes | Reference(s) |
|---|---|---|---|---|---|
| January 27 | Richard Gephardt | Missouri | House | House Democratic Leader | |
| February 3 | Thomas Daschle | South Dakota | Senate | Senate Democratic Leader | |
| February 10 | Kent Conrad | North Dakota | Senate | | |
| February 17 | Charles Rangel | New York | House | | |
| February 24 | Thomas Vilsack | Iowa | Governor | | |
| March 3 | John Spratt | South Carolina | House | Ranking Member of the House Budget Committee | |
| March 17 | Bob Menendez | New Jersey | House | | |
| March 24 | Russell Feingold | Wisconsin | Senate | | |
| March 31 | Gary Locke | Washington | Governor | | |
| April 8 | Jeff Bingaman and Jay Inslee | New Mexico (Bingaman) and Washington (Inslee) | Senate (Bingaman) and House (Inslee) | First Weekly Address that is spoken by more than one person | |
| April 21 | David Bonior | Michigan | House | | |
| April 28 | Patty Murray | Washington | Senate | | |
| May 5 | Terry McAuliffe | Virginia | Democratic National Committee Chairman | | |
| May 12 | Nita Lowey | New York | House | | |
| May 19 | Gray Davis | California | Governor | | |
| June 2 | Anna Eshoo | California | House | | |
| June 9 | John Edwards | North Carolina | Senate | | |
| June 16 | Richard Gephardt | Missouri | House | House Democratic Leader | |
| June 23 | Thomas Harkin | Iowa | Senate | | |
| July 7 | John Dingell | Michigan | House | | |
| July 14 | Tim Johnson | South Dakota | Senate | | |
| July 21 | James Turner | Texas | House | | |
| July 28 | Jean Carnahan | Missouri | Senate | | |
| August 4 | Terry McAuliffe | Virginia | Democratic National Committee Chairman | | |
| August 18 | Paul Wellstone | Minnesota | Senate | | |
| August 25 | John Spratt | South Carolina | House | | |
| September 1 | Mary Landrieu | Louisiana | Senate | | |
| September 8 | Ed Pastor | Arizona | House | | |
| September 16 | Hillary Clinton and Chuck Schumer | New York (Both) | Senate | First Weekly Address since the September 11 Attacks | |
| September 29 | James Hahn | California | Mayor | Mayor of Los Angeles | |
| October 6 | Martin Frost | Texas | House | | |
| October 13 | Thomas Daschle | South Dakota | Senate | Senate Democratic Leader | |
| October 20 | Nancy Pelosi | California | House | | |
| October 28 | Thomas Daschle | South Dakota | Senate | | |
| November 3 | Mark Green | New York | Former Commissioner and Democratic mayoral candidate | Democratic candidate for the 2001 New York City mayoral election. Later lost to Michael Bloomberg | |
| November 10 | Shelley Berkley | Nevada | House | | |
| November 17 | Jean Carnahan | Missouri | Senate | | |
| November 24 | Juanita McDonald | California | House | | |
| December 1 | Harry Reid | Nevada | Senate | | |
| December 15 | Thomas Daschle | South Dakota | Senate | Senate Democratic Leader | |
| December 29 | David Bonior | Michigan | House | | |

=== 2002 Weekly Democratic Address speakers ===
| Date | Speakers | State | Position | Notes | Reference(s) |
|---|---|---|---|---|---|
| January 6 | Byron L. Dorgan | North Dakota | Senate | | |
| January 12 | Michael Ross | Arkansas | House | | |
| January 19 | Terry McAuliffe | Virginia | Democratic National Committee Chairman | | |
| January 26 | Byron L. Dorgan | North Dakota | Senate | | |
| February 24 | Jim Matheson | Utah | House | | |
| March 2 | Jay Rockefeller | West Virginia | Senate | | |
| March 9 | Edward J. O'Brien | Pennsylvania | House candidate | Democratic candidate for the House of Representatives in Pennsylvania's 15th congressional district. Later lost to incumbent Representative Pat Toomey. | |
| March 17 | Tim Johnson | South Dakota | Senate | | |
| March 24 | Antonio Villaraigosa | California | Speaker Emeritus | Former Speaker of the California Assembly | |
| March 30 | Robert Matsui | California | House | | |
| April 6 | Edward Kennedy | Massachusetts | Senate | | |
| April 13 | John Conyers | Michigan | House | | |
| May 4 | Shelley Berkley | Nevada | House | | |
| June 1 | Bill Bradbury | Oregon | Oregon Secretary of State and Senate candidate | Was running for Senate in Oregon. Later lost the election to incumbent Republican Senator Gordon H. Smith. | |
| June 8 | Richard Gephardt | Missouri | House | | |
| June 15 | Bob Graham and Zell Miller | Florida (Graham) and Georgia (Miller) | Senate (Both) | | |
| June 22 | John Dingell | Michigan | House | | |
| June 29 | Paul Sarbanes | Maryland | Senate | | |
| July 13 | David Phelps | Illinois | House | | |
| July 20 | Paul Wellstone | Minnesota | Senate | | |
| July 27 | Rosa DeLauro | Connecticut | House | | |
| August 24 | Chellie Pingree | Maine | Senate candidate | Later lost to incumbent Senator Susan Collins | |
| December 8 | Maria Cantwell | Washington State | Senate | | |
| December 14 | Bob Menendez | New Jersey | House | | |
| December 20 | Harry Reid | Nevada | Senate | | |
| December 28 | Hillary Clinton | New York | Senate | | |

=== 2003 Weekly Democratic Address speakers ===
| Date | Speakers | State | Position | Notes | Reference(s) |
|---|---|---|---|---|---|
| April 19 | Elijah Cummings | Maryland | House | | |
| April 26 | Stephanie Tubbs Jones | Ohio | House | | |
| May 24 | Tom Daschle | South Dakota | Senate | | |
| July 26 | Tom Daschle | South Dakota | Senate | | |
| August 2 | Mark Warner | Virginia | Governor | | |
| August 9 | Charles Stenholm | Texas | House | | |
| August 16 | Artur Davis | Alabama | House | | |
| August 23 | Chuck Schumer | New York | Senate | | |
| August 31 | Sherrod Brown | Ohio | House | | |
| September 6 | Gray Davis | California | Governor | | |
| September 13 | Jane Harman | California | House | | |
| September 20 | Leticia Van de Putte | Texas | State Senator | | |
| September 27 | Patty Murray | Washington | Senate | | |
| October 4 | Tim Holden | Pennsylvania | Governor | | |
| October 11 | Baron Hill | Indiana | House | | |
| October 18 | Douglas H. Palmer | New Jersey | Mayor of Trenton | | |
| October 25 | Patrick Leahy | Vermont | Senate | | |
| November 1 | Ronnie Musgrove | Mississippi | Governor | | |
| November 8 | Chet Edwards | Texas | House | | |
| November 15 | Barbara Boxer | California | Senate | | |
| November 22 | Richard Perkins | Nevada | State Representative | | |
| November 28 | John Tanner | Tennessee | House | | |
| December 6 | Darlene Hooley | Oregon | House | | |
| December 13 | Harry Reid | Nevada | Senate | | |
| December 20 | Barbara Mikulski | Maryland | Senate | | |
| December 27 | Tom Vilsack | Iowa | Governor | | |

=== 2004 Weekly Democratic Address speakers ===
| Date | Speakers | State | Position | Notes | Reference(s) |
|---|---|---|---|---|---|
| January 3 | Tim Bishop | New York | House | | |
| January 10 | Jim Doyle | Wisconsin | Governor | | |
| January 17 | Michael Michaud | Maine | House | | |
| January 31 | Brad Miller | North Carolina | House | | |
| February 7 | Kwame Kilpatrick | Michigan | Mayor of Detroit | | |
| February 14 | Tom Vilsack | Iowa | Governor | | |
| February 21 | Janet Napolitano | Arizona | Governor | | |
| March 6 | John Kerry | Massachusetts | Senate | | |
| March 13 | Ted Kennedy | Massachusetts | Senate | | |
| March 20 | Jennifer Granholm | Michigan | Governor | | |
| March 27 | Nancy Pelosi | California | House | | |
| April 3 | John Kerry | Massachusetts | Senate | | |
| April 10 | Carl Levin | Michigan | Senate | | |
| April 17 | John Kerry | Massachusetts | Senate | | |
| April 24 | Mark Udall | Colorado | House | | |
| May 1 | Paul Rieckhoff | Washington, D.C. | writer | | |
| May 8 | Wesley Clark | Washington, D.C. | General of the United States Army | | |
| May 15 | John Kerry | Massachusetts | Senate | | |
| May 22 | John Kerry | Massachusetts | Senate | | |
| May 29 | John Kerry | Massachusetts | Senate | | |
| June 12 | John Kerry | Massachusetts | Senate | | |
| June 19 | Nick Lampson | Texas | House | | |
| June 26 | Barack Obama | Illinois | State Senator | | |
| July 3 | John Kerry | Massachusetts | Senate | | |
| July 10 | John Edwards | North Carolina | Senate | | |
| July 17 | Jan Schakowsky | Illinois | Senate | | |
| July 24 | John Kerry | Massachusetts | Senate | | |
| July 31 | Merrill McPeak | Washington, D.C. | Chief of Staff of the United States Air Force | | |
| August 14 | Maria Cantwell | Washington | Senate | | |
| August 21 | John Edwards | North Carolina | Senate | | |
| August 28 | Earl Pomeroy | North Dakota | House | | |
| September 4 | John Kerry | Massachusetts | Senate | | |
| September 18 | Betty Castor | Florida | Senate candidate | | |
| October 2 | John Edwards | North Carolina | Senate | | |
| October 9 | Steny Hoyer | Maryland | House | | |
| October 16 | John Edwards | North Carolina | Senate | | |
| October 23 | John Kerry | Massachusetts | Senate | | |
| October 30 | John Kerry | Massachusetts | Senate | | |
| November 6 | Nancy Pelosi | California | House | | |
| November 13 | Chet Edwards | Texas | House | | |
| November 20 | Harry Reid | Nevada | Senate | | |
| November 27 | Tom Vilsack | Iowa | Governor | | |
| December 4 | Bob Menendez | New Jersey | House | | |
| December 11 | Donna Brazile | Louisiana | Democratic National Committee | | |
| December 18 | Dick Durbin | Illinois | Senate | | |
| December 25 | Bill Richardson | New Mexico | Governor | | |

=== 2005 Weekly Democratic Address speakers ===
| Date | Speakers | State | Position | Notes | Reference(s) |
|---|---|---|---|---|---|
| January 8 | Charles Rangel | New York | House | | |
| January 15 | Debbie Stabenow | Michigan | Senate | | |
| January 22 | Christine Gregoire | Washington | Governor | | |
| January 29 | Ike Skelton | Missouri | House | | |
| February 5 | Terry McAuliffe | Virginia | Democratic National Committee | | |
| February 12 | Chuck Schumer | New York | Senate | | |
| February 19 | John Spratt | South Carolina | House | | |
| February 25 | Brian Schweitzer | Montana | Governor | | |
| March 5 | Kent Conrad | North Dakota | Senate | | |
| March 12 | James Roosevelt | New York | Social Security Administrator | | |
| March 19 | Ed Rendell | Pennsylvania | Governor | | |
| March 26 | Sander Levin | Michigan | House | | |
| April 2 | George Mitchell | Maine | Senate | | |
| April 9 | Harry Reid | Nevada | Senate | | |
| April 23 | Ed Markey | Massachusetts | House | | |
| April 30 | Mario Cuomo | New York | Former Governor | | |
| May 7 | Chuck Schumer | New York | Senate | | |
| May 14 | Bill Richardson | New Mexico | Governor | | |
| May 21 | Kendrick Meek | Florida | Senate | | |
| May 28 | Wesley Clark | Washington, D.C. | General of the United States Army | | |
| June 4 | Byron Dorgan | North Dakota | Senate | | |
| June 11 | Phil Bredesen | Tennessee | Governor | | |
| June 18 | Bob Etheridge | North Carolina | House | | |
| June 25 | Zbigniew Brzezinski | Virginia | National Security Advisor | | |
| July 2 | Patty Murray | Washington | Senate | | |
| July 9 | Harry Reid | Nevada | Senate | | |
| July 23 | Larry C. Johnson | Washington, D.C. | Former analyst for the Central Intelligence Agency | | |
| July 30 | Daniel Inouye | Hawaii | Senate | | |
| August 6 | John Lewis | Georgia | House | | |
| August 13 | John Salazar | Colorado | House | | |
| August 20 | Max Cleland | Georgia | Senate | | |
| August 27 | Ted Kennedy | Massachusetts | Senate | | |
| September 3 | Charles Melancon | Louisiana | House | | |
| September 10 | Bennie Thompson | Mississippi | House | | |
| September 17 | Kathleen Blanco | Louisiana | Governor | | |
| September 24 | Blanche Lincoln | Arkansas | Senate | | |
| October 1 | Maria Cantwell | Washington | Senate | | |
| October 8 | Rosa DeLauro | Connecticut | House | | |
| October 22 | Mark Pryor | Arkansas | Senate | | |
| October 29 | John Dingell | Michigan | House | | |
| November 5 | Barbara Mikulski | Maryland | Senate | | |
| November 19 | Dennis Cardoza | California | House | | |
| November 26 | Christine Gregoire | Washington | Governor | | |
| December 24 | Jim Clyburn | South Carolina | House | | |
| December 31 | Nancy Pelosi | California | House | | |

=== 2006 Weekly Democratic Address speakers ===
| Date | Speakers | State | Position | Notes | Reference(s) |
|---|---|---|---|---|---|
| January 7 | Louise Slaughter | New York | House | | |
| January 14 | Dick Durbin | Illinois | Senate | | |
| January 21 | Harry Reid | Nevada | Senate | | |
| January 28 | Henry Waxman | California | House | | |
| February 4 | Jennifer Granholm | Michigan | Governor | | |
| February 11 | Bob Menendez | New Jersey | Senate | | |
| February 18 | Patsy Madrid | New Mexico | Attorney General of New Mexico | | |
| February 25 | Jon Corzine | New Jersey | Governor | | |
| March 4 | Francine Busby | California | House candidate | | |
| March 11 | Howard Dean | Vermont | Democratic National Committee | | |
| March 18 | Dianne Feinstein | California | Senate | | |
| March 25 | Marion Barry | Arkansas | House | | |
| April 1 | Wesley Clark | Washington, D.C. | NATO | | |
| April 8 | Steny Hoyer | Maryland | House | | |
| April 15 | Hilda Solis | California | House | | |
| April 22 | Bill Nelson | Florida | House | | |
| April 29 | Bart Stupak | Michigan | House | | |
| May 6 | Maria Cantwell | Washington | Senate | | |
| May 13 | Ron Klein | Florida | State Senator | | |
| May 20 | Mike Honda | California | House | | |
| June 3 | Peter Welch | Vermont | House | | |
| June 10 | Harry Reid | Nevada | Senate | | |
| June 17 | Nancy Pelosi | California | House | | |
| June 24 | Howard Dean | Vermont | Democratic National Committee | | |
| July 1 | Jim Webb | Virginia | Senate candidate | | |
| July 8 | Bruce Braley | Iowa | House | | |
| July 15 | Claire McCaskill | Missouri | Senate | | |
| July 22 | Diana DeGette | California | House | | |
| July 29 | Bill Richardson | New Mexico | Governor | | |
| August 5 | Ken Salazar | Colorado | Senate | | |
| August 26 | Mary Landrieu | Louisiana | Senate | | |
| September 2 | Bennie Thompson | Mississippi | House | | |
| September 16 | Chris Murphy | Connecticut | House candidate | | |
| September 30 | Tammy Duckworth | Illinois | House candidate | | |
| October 7 | Patty Wetterling | Minnesota | House candidate | | |
| October 14 | Patrick Murphy | Pennsylvania | House candidate | | |
| October 21 | Diane Farrell | Connecticut | House candidate | | |
| November 4 | Lois Murphy | Pennsylvania | House candidate | | |
| November 11 | Howard Dean | Vermont | Democratic National Committee | | |
| November 18 | Harry Reid | Nevada | Senate | | |
| November 25 | Steny Hoyer | Maryland | House | | |
| December 2 | Jim Wallis | Washington, D.C. | editor in chief of Sojourners magazine | | |
| December 9 | Silvestre Reyes | Texas | House | | |
| December 16 | William Perry | Pennsylvania | United States Secretary of Defense | | |
| December 23 | Evan Bayh | Indiana | Senate | | |
| December 30 | Jerry McNerney | California | House elect | | |

=== 2007 Weekly Democratic Address speakers ===
| Date | Speakers | State | Position | Notes | Reference(s) |
|---|---|---|---|---|---|
| January 6 | Harry Reid | Nevada | Majority Leader of the United States Senate | | |
| January 10 | Dick Durbin | Illinois | Senate | | |
| January 13 | Tim Walz | Minnesota | Senate | | |
| January 20 | Brian Schweitzer | Montana | Governor | | |
| January 27 | Antonio Villaraigosa | California | Mayor of Los Angeles | | |
| February 3 | Jim Clyburn | South Carolina | House | | |
| February 17 | Christopher Carney | Pennsylvania | House | | |
| February 24 | Richard C. Holbrooke | New York | Ambassador to the UN | | |
| March 10 | Harry Mitchell | Arizona | House | | |
| March 17 | Patty Murray | Washington | Senate | | |
| March 24 | Paul Hodes | New Hampshire | House | | |
| March 31 | Andrew Horne | Kentucky | U.S. Marine Corps Reserves Lieutenant Colonel and Attorney | | |
| April 7 | Howard Dean | Vermont | Democratic National Committee | | |
| April 14 | Rahm Emanuel | Illinois | House | | |
| April 21 | Amy Klobuchar | Minnesota | Senate | | |
| April 28 | William Odom | Washington, D.C. | Lieutenant General | | |
| May 5 | Chuck Schumer | New York | Senate | | |
| May 12 | Melvyn S. Montano | New York | United States Air Force | | |
| May 19 | Rosa DeLauro | Connecticut | House | | |
| May 26 | Elliott Anderson | Nevada | United States Marine Corps | | |
| June 2 | Ed Markey | Massachusetts | House | | |
| June 16 | Maria Cantwell | Washington | Senate | | |
| June 23 | Chet Edwards | Texas | House | | |
| June 30 | Harry Reid | Nevada | Majority Leader of the United States Senate | | |
| July 21 | Carl Levin | Michigan | Senate | | |
| August 11 | Ellen Tauscher | California | House | | |
| August 18 | Fawn Townsend | North Carolina | waitress | | |
| August 25 | Max Cleland | Georgia | Senate | | |
| September 8 | Harry Reid | Nevada | Majority Leader of the United States Senate | | |
| September 15 | Tom Lantos | California | House | | |
| September 22 | Ed Rendell | Pennsylvania | Governor | | |
| September 28 | Graeme Frost | Maryland | 7th-Grade Student | First Non-Politician to make a Weekly Opposition Address. | |
| October 6 | Steny Hoyer | Maryland | House | | |
| October 13 | Max Baucus | Montana | Senate | | |
| October 20 | Jennifer Howse | Washington, D.C. | March of Dimes President | | |
| October 27 | Howard Dean | Vermont | Democratic National Committee | | |
| November 3 | Patty Murray | Washington | Senate | | |
| November 10 | Joseph Sestak | Pennsylvania | House | | |
| November 17 | Robert Casey | Pennsylvania | Senate | | |
| November 24 | Ricardo S. Sanchez | New Mexico | Lieutenant General | | |
| December 8 | Dick Durbin | Illinois | Senate | | |
| December 15 | Nancy Pelosi | California | Speaker of the United States House of Representatives | | |
| December 29 | Kirsten Gillibrand | New York | House | | |

=== 2008 Weekly Democratic Address speakers ===
Democratic nominee Barack Obama was elected president while the Democrats hold majorities in both houses. After the election, Obama gives out weekly addresses on the behalf of all Democrats.

| Date | Speakers | State | Position | Notes | Reference(s) |
|---|---|---|---|---|---|
| January 6 | Howard Dean | Vermont | Democratic National Committee Chairman | | |
| January 20 | Barney Frank | Massachusetts | House | | |
| January 26 | Byron Dorgan | North Dakota | Senate | | |
| February 2 | Joe Manchin | West Virginia | Governor | | |
| February 9 | Charles Rangel | New York | House | | |
| February 16 | Sheldon Whitehouse | Rhode Island | Senate | | |
| February 23 | John Conyers | Michigan | House | | |
| March 1 | Joe Donnelly | Indiana | House | | |
| March 15 | Kent Conrad | North Dakota | Senate | | |
| March 22 | Bob Menendez | New Jersey | Senate | | |
| March 29 | Bill Foster | Illinois | House | | |
| April 5 | Joe Biden | Delaware | Senate | Democratic candidate for the Democratic presidential primaries. Withdrew on January 3, 2008, but later became a running mate in Obama's campaign and, after the election, Vice President in the Obama administration. | |
| April 12 | John Yarmuth | Kentucky | House | | |
| April 19 | Howard Dean | Vermont | Democratic National Committee Chairman | | |
| May 10 | Debbie Stabenow | Michigan | Senate | | |
| May 17 | Xavier Becerra | California | House | | |
| May 24 | John Boccieri | Ohio | Senate | | |
| May 31 | Barbara Boxer | California | Senate | | |
| June 7 | John Spratt | South Carolina | House | | |
| June 14 | Jeff Alberici | New York | Teacher | A father and Non-Politician who delivered the address as part of Fathers' Day weekend. | |
| June 29 | Bill Richardson | New Mexico | New Mexico | | |
| July 12 | Chris Van Hollen | Maryland | House | | |
| July 19 | Patty Murray | Washington | Senate | | |
| July 26 | Jack Reed | Rhode Island | Senate | | |
| August 2 | Henry Waxman | California | House | | |
| August 9 | Barack Obama | Illinois | Senate and presumptive presidential candidate | | |
| August 16 | Nancy Pelosi | California | House | Speaker of the House | |
| August 31 | Hillary Clinton | New York | Senate, and former Democratic presidential candidate | Lost the primaries. Later served as Secretary of State under the Obama administration from 2009 to 2013. | |
| September 20 | Barack Obama | Illinois | Senate and presidential candidate | | |
| October 4 | Ted Strickland | Ohio | Governor | | |
| October 11 | Joe Biden | Delaware | Senate and vice presidential candidate | | |
| October 18 | Rahm Emanuel | Illinois | House | | |
| October 26 | Michelle Obama | Illinois | Spouse of Barack Obama | | |
| November 1 | Barack Obama | Illinois | Senate and presidential candidate | | |
| November 8 | Barack Obama | Illinois | Senate and President-elect | Won the election against John McCain | |
| November 15 | Barack Obama | Illinois | Senate and President-Elect | First Weekly Democratic Address to be in a form of a Video. Obama Resigned as Senator of Illinois the next day. | |
| November 22 | Barack Obama | Illinois | President-Elect | | |
| November 29 | Barack Obama | Illinois | President-Elect | | |
| December 6 | Barack Obama | Illinois | President-Elect | | |
| December 13 | Barack Obama | Illinois | President-Elect | | |
| December 20 | Barack Obama | Illinois | President-Elect | | |
| December 24 | Barack Obama | Illinois | President-Elect | | |

=== 2009 Weekly Democratic Address speakers ===
When Barack Obama was inaugurated as president, Democrats returned to having Weekly Addresses by the President while Republicans began the use of Weekly Responses. Democrats later returned to the Weekly Address format on January 21, 2017, with the inauguration of Donald Trump.

| Date | Speakers | State | Position | Notes | Reference(s) |
|---|---|---|---|---|---|
| January 3 | Barack Obama | Illinois | President-Elect | | |
| January 10 | Barack Obama | Illinois | President-Elect | | |
| January 17 | Barack Obama | Illinois | President-Elect | Final Weekly Address as the opposition | |

== Donald Trump ==
=== First Administration ===
==== 2017 Weekly Democratic Address speakers ====
Republican President Donald Trump was inaugurated on January 20, and Republicans currently hold majorities in both houses of Congress. For the first time, the Democrats, as the Opposition, will begin and continue using video addresses in addition to its usual Radio Address that the Democrats made in the Bush Administration. Unlike the previous series of speeches under the Bush Administration, the majority of the speeches were rotated each week between House and Senate Democrats. The Republicans also did weekly video addresses during the Obama Administration.

| Date | Speakers | State | Position | Notes | Reference(s) |
|---|---|---|---|---|---|
| January 21 | Chuck Schumer | New York | Senate | Senate Democratic Leader. President Donald Trump did not make a Weekly Address. | |
| January 28 | Nancy Pelosi | California | House | House Democratic Leader | |
| February 3 | Ed Markey | Massachusetts | Senate | | |
| February 10 | Joe Crowley | New York | House | Chairman of the Democratic Caucus | |
| February 17 | Tammy Duckworth | Illinois | Senate | | |
| February 25 | Linda Sánchez | California | House | Vice Chairwoman of the House Democratic Caucus; first weekly address to be addressed in Spanish. | |
| March 3 | Chris Murphy | Connecticut | Senate | | |
| March 10 | Cheri Bustos | Illinois | House | | |
| March 17 | Jeanne Shaheen | New Hampshire | Senate and former Governor | | |
| March 25 | Adam Schiff | California | House | | |
| April 1 | Sheldon Whitehouse | Rhode Island | Senate | Host of over 100 community dinners | |
| April 8 | Hakeem Jeffries | New York | House | Weekly Address, Co-Chair of the House Democratic Policy & Communications Committee | |
| April 15 | Tom Perez | Maryland | Democratic National Committee Chairman | | |
| April 21 | Ben Ray Luján | New Mexico | House | | |
| April 28 | Brian Schatz | Hawaii | Senate | | |
| May 5 | Steny Hoyer | Maryland | House | Democratic Whip | |
| May 13 | Kirsten Gillibrand | New York | Senate | | |
| May 19 | David Cicilline | Rhode Island | House | | |
| May 26 | Tom Carper | Delaware | Senate and former Governor | | |
| June 2 | Eric Swalwell | California | House | | |
| June 9 | Ron Wyden | Oregon | Senate | | |
| June 16 | James Clyburn | South Carolina | House | | |
| June 23 | Mazie Hirono | Hawaii | Senate | | |
| June 30 | Joe Kennedy III | Massachusetts | House | | |
| July 7 | Debbie Stabenow, Michael Bennet, Martin Heinrich, Maggie Hassan, Jon Tester, Mazie Hirono, Cory Booker, Chris Van Hollen, and Tammy Baldwin | Michigan, Colorado, New Mexico, New Hampshire, Montana, Hawaii, New Jersey, Maryland, and Wisconsin (respectively) | Senate | Consists of various Democratic Senators giving out their concerns over the American Health Care Act while hosting events across the country. | |
| July 13 | Bennie Thompson | Mississippi | House | | |
| July 21 | Patty Murray | Washington | Senate | | |
| July 28 | Betty McCollum | Minnesota | House | | |
| August 5 | Tammy Baldwin | Wisconsin | Senate | | |
| August 11 | Cedric Richmond | Louisiana | House | | |
| August 18 | Tim Kaine and Mark R. Warner | Virginia (Both Senators) | Senate | The Address was in response to the Unite the Right rally in Charlottesville, Virginia. President Trump did not made a Weekly Address. Senator Kaine was also Hillary Clinton's running mate for her presidential campaign whom they lost against Trump. | |
| August 25 | Jim Himes | Connecticut | House | | |
| September 1 | Sherrod Brown | Ohio | Senate | | |
| September 8 | Michelle Lujan Grisham | New Mexico | House | | |
| September 15 | Dick Durbin | Illinois | Senate | | |
| September 22 | John Yarmuth | Kentucky | House | | |
| September 29 | Catherine Cortez Masto | Nevada | Senate | | |
| October 6 | John Lewis | Georgia | House | | |
| October 13 | Bernie Sanders (I) | Vermont | Senate | Independent Senator who caucuses with the Democratic Senate. Also campaigned for the Democratic nomination for president in 2016. | |
| October 20 | Richard Neal | Massachusetts | House | | |
| October 27 | Ben Cardin | Maryland | Senate | | |
| November 3 | Rosa DeLauro | Connecticut | House | | |
| November 10 | Jon Tester | Montana | Senate | | |
| November 17 | Suzan DelBene | Connecticut | House | | |
| November 25 | Michael Bennet | Colorado | Senate | | |
| December 1 | Jackie Speier | California | House | | |
| December 2 | Chris Coons | Delaware | Senate | | |
| December 15 | Mike Thompson | California | House | | |
| December 23 | Bob Casey | Pennsylvania | Senate | The President did not release a Weekly Address; the Address gives out his concerns and reaction to the Tax Cuts and Jobs Act of 2017. | |
| December 30 | Tim Walz | Minnesota | House | President Trump continued to not release another weekly address for the second consecutive week. | |

==== 2018 Weekly Democratic Address speakers ====
President Trump discontinued his Weekly Addresses in August 2018, although the Democrats continued their weekly addresses since then.

| Date | Speakers | State | Position | Notes | Reference(s) |
|---|---|---|---|---|---|
| January 5 | Maggie Hassan | New Hampshire | Senate | President Trump continued to not release another weekly address. The address concerns the opioid epidemic. | |
| January 12 | Terri Sewell | Alabama | House | President Trump continued to not release another weekly address for the second consecutive week Although he did made a Weekly Address on Martin Luther King Jr. Day. | |
| January 19 | Chris Van Hollen | Maryland | Senate | There was no Weekly Address from President Trump. This was taken before the Government Shutdown. | |
| January 26 | Adam Smith | Washington | House | | |
| February 2 | Tina Smith | Minnesota | Senate | | |
| February 9 | Peter DeFazio | Oregon | House | | |
| February 1 | Bob Casey, Sheldon Whitehouse, and Ron Wyden | Pennsylvania, Rhode Island, and Oregon | Senate | | |
| February 24 | Ted Deutch | Florida | House | | |
| March 2 | Dianne Feinstein | California | Senate | | |
| March 9 | Bill Pascrell | New Jersey | House | | |
| March 16 | Jeff Merkley | Oregon | Senate | | |
| March 24 | Robin Kelly | Illinois | House | | |
| March 31 | Cory Booker | New Jersey | Senate | | |
| April 6 | John Lewis | Georgia | House | | |
| April 13 | Sheldon Whitehouse | Rhode Island | Senate | | |
| April 20 | Richard Neal | Massachusetts | House | | |
| April 27 | Jeanne Shaheen | New Hampshire | Senate | | |
| May 4 | Katherine Clark | Massachusetts | House | | |
| May 11 | Debbie Stabenow | Michigan | Senate | | |
| May 18 | Marcia Fudge | Ohio | House | | |
| May 5 | Ed Markey | Massachusetts | Senate | | |
| June 1 | John Sarbanes | Maryland | House | | |
| June 8 | Tim Kaine | Virginia | Senate | | |
| June 15 | Frank Pallone | New Jersey | House | | |
| June 22 | Mazie Hirono | Hawaii | Senate | | |
| June 29 | Matt Cartwright | Pennsylvania | House | | |
| July 6 | Patty Murray | Washington | Senate | | |
| July 13 | Richard Blumenthal | Connecticut | Senate | | |
| July 20 | Dan Kildee | Michigan | House | | |
| July 27 | Stephanie Murphy | Florida | House | | |
| August 3 | Brian Schatz | Hawaii | Senate | | |
| August 10 | Bobby Scott | Virginia | House | | |
| August 17 | Tammy Baldwin | Wisconsin | Senate | | |
| August 24 | Elijah Cummings | Maryland | House | | |
| August 31 | Sherrod Brown | Ohio | Senate | | |
| September 7 | Lloyd Doggett | Texas | House | | |
| September 14 | Patrick Leahy | Vermont | Senate | | |
| September 21 | Nydia Velázquez | New York | House | | |
| September 8 | Patty Murray | Washington | Senate | | |
| October 5 | Jerry Nadler | New York | House | | |
| October 12 | Doug Jones | Alabama | Senate | | |
| October 19 | Diana DeGette | Colorado | House | | |
| October 26 | Catherine Cortez Masto | Nevada | Senate | | |
| November 2 | Mike Doyle | Pennsylvania | House | | |
| November 9 | Chris Murphy | Connecticut | Senate | | |
| November 16 | Gerry Connolly | Virginia | House | | |
| November 23 | Mark Warner | Virginia | Senate | | |
| November 30 | Katie Hill | California | House | | |
| December 7 | Ron Wyden | Oregon | Senate | | |
| December 14 | Lucille Roybal-Allard | California | House | | |
| December 21 | Chuck Schumer | New York | Senate | Senate Democratic Leader. President Donald Trump did not make a Weekly Address as he discontinued the addresses in June. This address is a pre-recorded clip of a speech from Schumer during the Senate Session address the Government Shutdown and the criticisms of the Trump administration. | |
| December 28 | Joe Neguse | Colorado | House | | |

==== 2019 Weekly Democratic Address speakers ====
As of July 2019, President Trump has not issued a weekly address.

| Date | Speakers | State | Position | Notes | Reference(s) |
|---|---|---|---|---|---|
| January 4 | Chris Van Hollen | Maryland | Senate | | |
| January 11 | Scott Peters | California | House | | |
| January 18 | Amy Klobuchar | New Mexico | Senate | | |
| January 25 | Ted Lieu | California | House | | |
| February 1 | Ben Cardin | Maryland | Senate | | |
| February 8 | Barbara Lee | California | House | | |
| February 15 | Patrick Leahy | Vermont | Senate | | |
| February 22 | Lucy McBath | Georgia | House | | |
| March 1 | Tom Udall | New Mexico | Senate | | |
| March 8 | Andy Kim | New Jersey | House | | |
| March 15 | Brian Schatz | Hawaii | Senate | | |
| March 22 | Lauren Underwood | Illinois | House | | |
| March 29 | Tina Smith | Minnesota | Senate | | |
| April 5 | Colin Allred | Texas | House | | |
| April 12 | Jeanne Shaheen | New Hampshire | Senate | | |
| April 19 | Debbie Dingell | Michigan | House | | |
| April 26 | Martin Heinrich | New Mexico | Senate | | |
| May 3 | Kathy Castor | Florida | House | | |
| May 10 | Jacky Rosen | Nevada | Senate | | |
| May 17 | Ann McLane Kuster | New Hampshire | House | | |
| May 24 | Debbie Stabenow | Michigan | Senate | | |
| May 31 | Emanuel Cleaver | Missouri | House | | |
| June 7 | Mark Warner | Virginia | Senate | | |
| June 14 | Jan Schakowsky | Illinois | House | | |
| June 21 | Richard Blumenthal | Connecticut | Senate | | |
| June 28 | Zoe Lofgren | California | House | | |
| July 5 | Doug Jones | Alabama | Senate | | |
| July 12 | Carolyn Maloney | New York | House | | |
| July 19 | Jeff Merkley | Oregon | Senate | | |
| July 26 | Haley Stevens | Michigan | House | | |
| August 2 | Chris Murphy | Connecticut | Senate | | |
| August 9 | Jim McGovern | Massachusetts | House | | |
| August 16 | Bob Casey | Pennsylvania | Senate | | |
| August 23 | Dean Phillips | Minnesota | House | | |
| August 30 | Sherrod Brown | Ohio | Senate | | |
| September 6 | Debbie Wasserman Schultz | Florida | House | | |
| September 13 | Catherine Cortez Masto | Nevada | Senate | | |
| September 20 | Joaquin Castro | Texas | House | | |
| October 4 | Lisa Blunt Rochester | Delaware | House | | |
| October 11 | Chuck Schumer | New York | Senate | | |
| October 18 | Donna Shalala | Florida | House | | |
| October 25 | Tammy Duckworth | Illinois | Senate | | |
| November 1 | Eliot Engel | New York | House | | |
| November 8 | Sheldon Whitehouse | Rhode Island | Senate | | |
| November 15 | Veronica Escobar | Texas | House | | |
| November 22 | Jon Tester | Montana | Senate | | |
| November 29 | Sean Casten | Illinois | House | | |
| December 6 | Tammy Baldwin | Wisconsin | Senate | | |
| December 13 | Kim Schrier | Washington | House | | |
| December 20 | Chris Coons | Delaware | Senate | | |
| December 27 | Jimmy Gomez | California | House | | |

==== 2021 ====
It was discontinued upon Trump's loss to Joe Biden in the 2020 election.

=== Second Administration ===
==== 2025 ====
After Donald Trump was inaugurated for a second non-consecutive term on January 20 and the Republican Party holding majorities on both houses of Congress, the Democratic Party, as the opposition, resumed the weekly addresses. Despite returning to the rotating Senate-House Cycle to for delivering speeches, the Senate Democrats stop holding their weekly addresses after February 8, leaving only the House Democrats to hold a bi-weekly address.

| Date | Speakers | State | Position | Notes | Reference(s) |
|---|---|---|---|---|---|
| February 1 | George Whitesides | California | House | First Weekly Address by the Democrats as the opposition since 2021. Recorded in California in a neighborhood that was destroyed by the 2025 California wildfires and was recently sworn in to congress a month before the speech was recorded. | |
| February 8 | Tim Kaine | Virginia | Senate | | |
| February 15 | Jahana Hayes | Connecticut | House | | |
| February 22 | None (Address was not delivered) | | | | |
| March 1 | Brittany Pettersen | Colorado | House | Brittany's newest son, Sam, who she recently gave birth four weeks before delivering the address, appears in the video on his mother's arms. | |
| March 8 | None (Address was not delivered) | | | | |
| March 15 | None (Address was not delivered) | | | | |
| March 22 | Yassamin Ansari | Arizona | House | | |

== See also ==
- Weekly Republican Address - Republican counterpart during a Democratic presidency
- Weekly address of the president of the United States
