= Weekly address of the president of the United States =

Regular radio speech of the American president

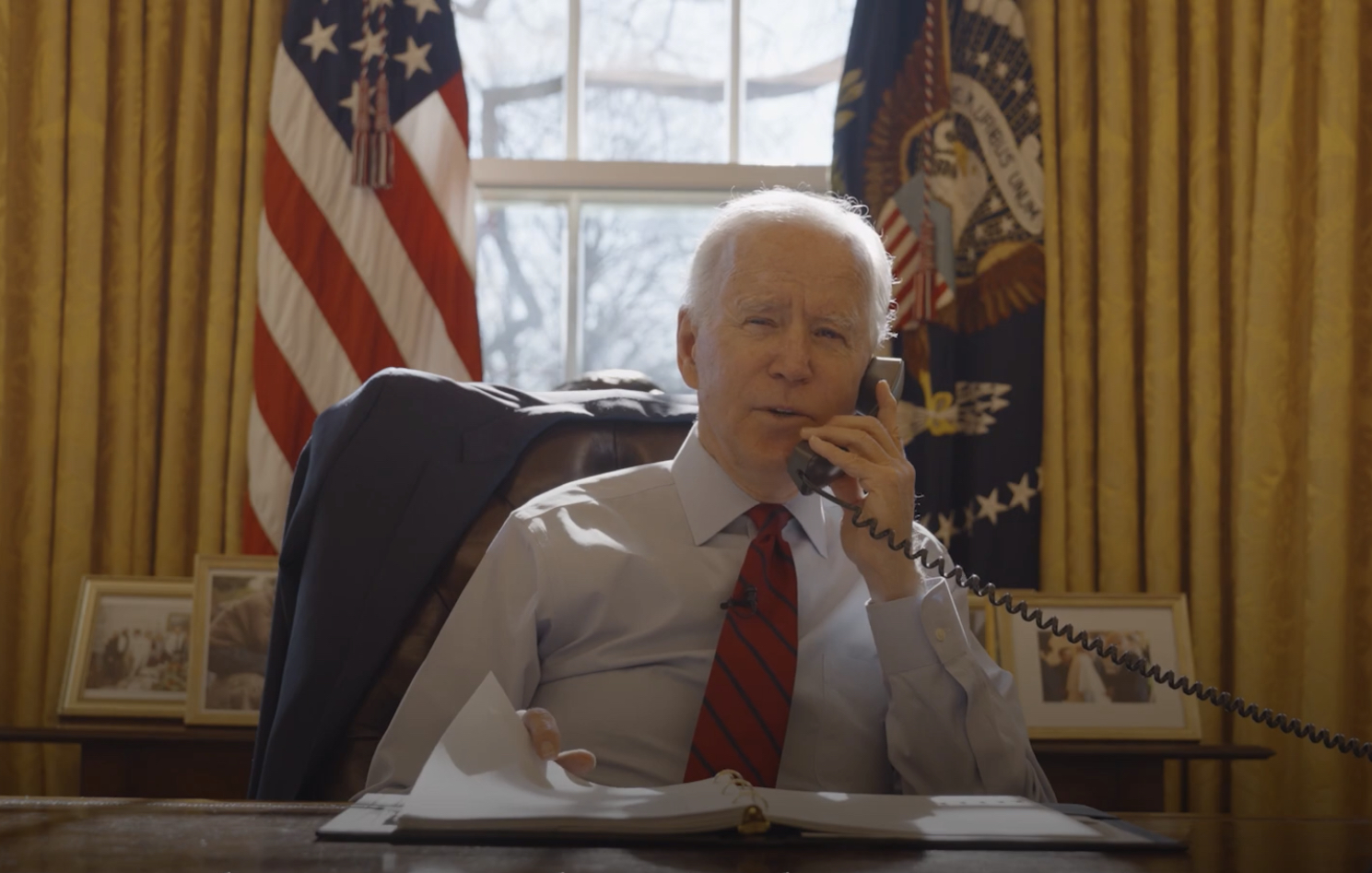
Joe Biden speaking with a citizen during his first “Weekly Conversation” as President.

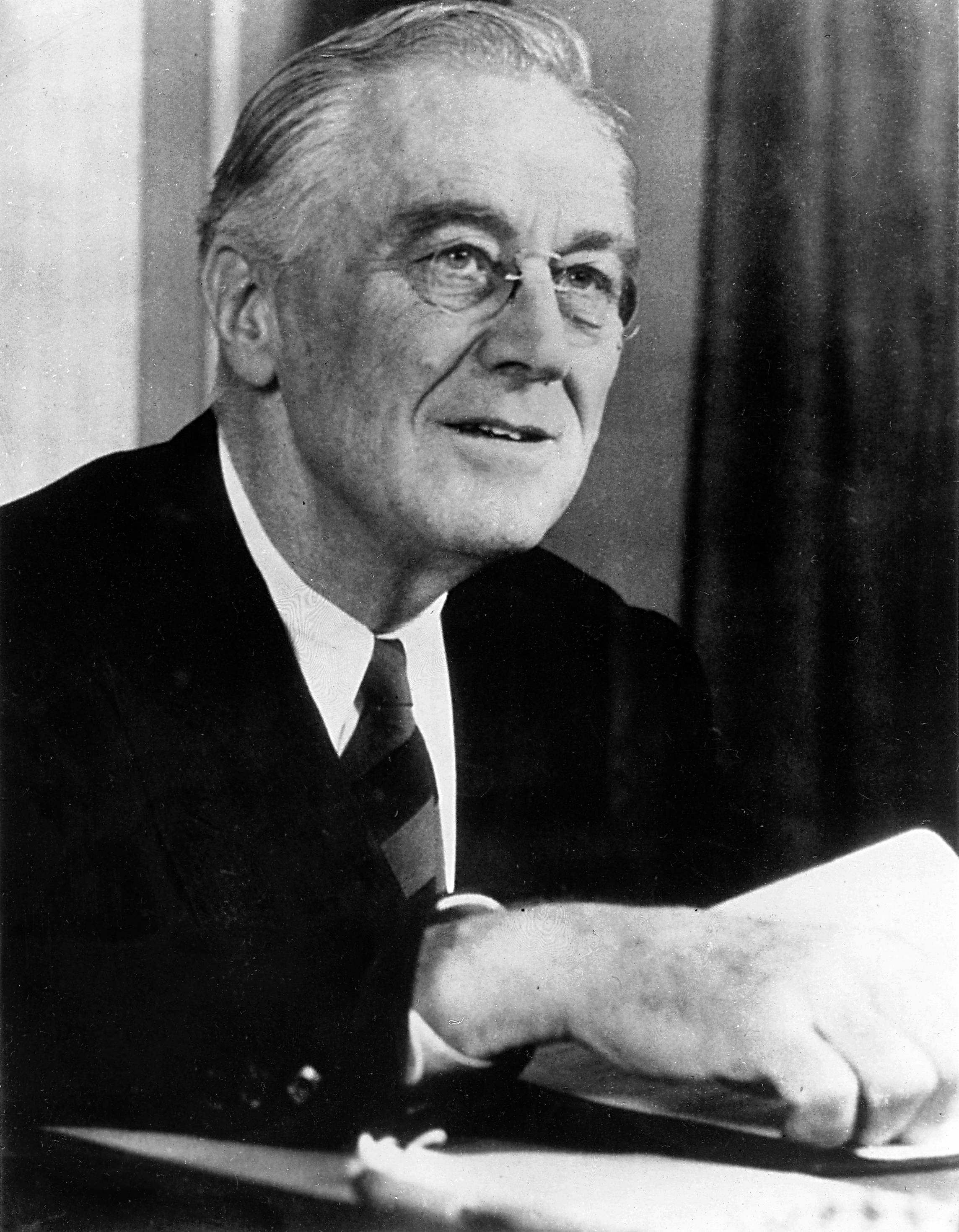
Franklin D. Roosevelt after giving one of his fireside chats, the predecessor to the Weekly Address.

The weekly address of the president of the United States (also known as the Weekly (Radio) Address or Your Weekly Address) was the weekly speech by the president of the United States to the nation. Franklin D. Roosevelt was the first U.S. president to deliver such radio addresses. Ronald Reagan revived the practice of delivering a weekly Saturday radio broadcast in 1982, and his successors all continued the practice until Donald Trump ceased doing so seventeen months into his first term.

As the Internet became mainstream during the 1990s, the weekly address was made available on other media. George W. Bush introduced an audio podcast feed and Barack Obama introduced a weekly video address during his presidential transition period. Donald Trump continued the weekly video address for the first nine months of his first administration, after which he ended the practice. He later released occasional "weekly" addresses before ceasing the tradition in June 2018. Trump has not continued the tradition in his second term.

Joe Biden revived the practice of making a weekly address in February 2021 in the form of “Weekly Conversations”, answering prepared questions or concerns from citizens. In July 2021, he stopped doing Weekly Conversations. As vice president, Biden made weekly addresses on behalf of Barack Obama during the Obama administration.

== History ==
Franklin D. Roosevelt first used what would become known as fireside chats in 1929 as Governor of New York. His third gubernatorial address—April 3, 1929, on WGY radio—is cited by Roosevelt biographer Frank Freidel as being the first fireside chat. As president he continued the tradition, which he called his fireside chats. The success of these presidential addresses encouraged their continuation by future presidents.

The practice of regularly scheduled addresses began in 1982 when President Ronald Reagan started delivering a radio broadcast every Saturday. Conservative journalist William A. Rusher, who publicly urged Reagan to begin the series of broadcasts, explicitly referred to the "fireside chats" and compared Reagan's communications skills to those of Roosevelt. During a sound check in preparation for his radio address of August 11, 1984, Reagan made the following comments in jest, which were later leaked to the general public: "My fellow Americans, I'm pleased to tell you today that I've signed legislation that will outlaw Russia forever. We begin bombing in five minutes."

George H. W. Bush did not regularly record a weekly radio address; he recorded only a total of 18 addresses during his term in office, most toward the latter part. Bill Clinton regularly recorded a weekly radio address, often going over ten minutes with some speeches early in his term. George W. Bush was the first president to deliver the weekly radio address in English and Spanish, which he continued to throughout his presidency. Later, George W. Bush began to have his addresses posted as an audio podcast once that technology became popular.

Barack Obama used YouTube for regular video addresses as President-elect and after his inauguration the weekly addresses continued on the White House website, the official White House YouTube channel, and networks such as C-SPAN, with the 24-hour cable news channels and network morning shows usually airing the full address only if the topic involves a breaking news event; short summaries of the address and the talking points within were otherwise edited and presented within regular news reports throughout each Saturday.

Until his final broadcast, Donald Trump continued to use the video address as his predecessor did. His weekly address also webcast on Facebook as a live stream, releasing the address on Fridays instead of Saturdays.

It has long become customary for the president's Weekly Radio Address to be followed by a response from the opposition party. When the president is a Democrat, the opposition's response is given by a Republican and vice versa. This response is not limited to only responding by the subject of the president's address, but may address other topics of political or social interest, a tribute to a figure who has died in the last week, a general patriotic message on holiday weekends (the latter two of which can also be part of the presidential address), or other concerns working through the Senate or House which have not yet been addressed by the executive branch. Despite the discontinuation of the president's weekly addresses, the Democrats still continued their weekly address through the remainder of the Trump administration.

A common complaint about the president's Weekly Radio Address pre-digital age (but remaining in the mainstream) is that only a few radio stations (mainly public radio and all-news radio outlets, a format very rare outside of major metropolitan areas) cover the very short broadcasts, they are not advertised publicly, and very few Americans are able to find address coverage on their local radio dial; Saturday mornings usually have brokered or paid programming carried on most commercial radio stations.

== See also ==
- Oval Office address
- State of the Union
- Weekly Democratic Address, the opposition response during a Republican presidency
- Weekly Republican Address, the opposition response during a Democratic presidency
