= State Children's Health Insurance Program in Utah =

Following the signing of the Children’s Health Insurance Program (CHIP) into law on August 5, 1997, as Title XXI of the Social Security Act, Utah started looking at how to implement the Federal program under the Center for Medicare and Medicaid Services.

== Overview ==
In seven states, five territories, and the District of Columbia, CHIP is covered under the umbrella of Medicaid. In 26 states, it is run jointly with Medicaid. In the remaining 17 states, Utah being one of them, it is an independently run program. As a government-founded, majority-funded, and independently run program, CHIP in Utah has reached many of the goals it was designed to accomplish; it has successfully assisted thousands of children gain access to timely medical care that would not have otherwise been covered, as well as covering others that would be deemed “uninsurable”.

=== Utah administration ===
To compare nationwide, as of 2012, approximately one-third of all children in the U.S., (totaling 36 million in 2011), receive health insurance coverage through CHIP or Medicaid; seven million are funded through CHIP alone. In Utah, as of January 2012, 62,071 children (7%) are enrolled in CHIP, 237,125 (27%) in Medicaid, and 100,674 (11.4%) still remain uninsured.

The current Utah maximum income thresholds range from $30,260 annually for a single parent with one child, $46,100 for a family of four (two parents and two children or a single parent and three children), and up to $69,860 for a family of seven. See the following chart for Utah’s list of income thresholds.

Family Size	Maximum Gross Income Per Month	Maximum Gross Income Per Year
2	$2,522	$30,260
3	$3,182	$38,180
4	$3,842	$46,100
5	$4,502	$54,020
6	$5,162	$61,940
7	$5,822	$69,860

CHIP premium payments are minimal and in Utah the maximum out-of-pocket expenses cannot exceed five percent of the family income. Co-Pay Plans A, B and C are the current CHIP coverage plans in Utah for 2012. For plan A, the quarterly premiums per family are $0, with plan B requiring $30, and $75 for plan C. These plans are also based on family income. Coverage begins during the month of enrollment and is reassessed annually on the anniversary of that enrollment

=== Utah coverage ===
In Utah the CHIP program provides coverage for doctor visits, well-child exams, prescription drugs, hospitalization, labs and x-rays, hearing and eye exams, mental health services, physical therapy, and dental care. CHIP enrollment requires the child be a US citizen. CHIP also dictates that no other health insurance is involved. If a child covered by CHIP is discovered to have additional insurance, the child immediately loses their CHIP coverage. Currently parents in Utah are not allowed enrollment in CHIP, nor can pregnant women enroll.

== Utah funding ==
In Utah, the majority of funding is federal, with a $4 federal match per every $1 of Utah spending on CHIP. Most of the state funding comes from the result of the Tobacco Master Settlement Agreement.

Federally, the CHIP program is also partly funded from appropriations by congress using a federal funding formula that is based upon several items including the number of eligible children in the CHIP population and the proportion of uninsured and low-income population. This formula produces a rate known as the Medicaid Federal Medical Assistance Percentage (FMAP). In order to create interest in CHIP, and to provide an incentive for CHIP enrollment, there is typically an enhanced coverage rate of 15 points higher than that for Medicaid. Therefore, if a state receives 60% matching rate for Medicaid, they will likely receive a 75% match for CHIP. As of 2012 the average national Medicaid match is 71% with Utah currently receiving 79.69% for CHIP.

Because CHIP is a capped program, every fiscal year the Centers for Medicare and Medicaid Services (CMS) determine the amount of funding they will appropriate to each state. In fiscal year (FY) 2009, states received a total of $3.15 billion from CMS, with an additional $7.48 billion in federal funds. That same year, Utah contributed $14.34 million into the program with federal funds of $55.61 million.

Beginning October 1, 2015, the matching enhanced funding rates provided by the federal government will be increased from 15 to 23 points, bringing the average up to 93%.

== Utah enrollment ==
CHIP programs have ambitious goals regarding enrollment. In order to capture as many candidates as possible, the program has partnered with other government and educational organizations. Federally, CHIPRA included additional outreach grants to many states in order to fund these programs. States have used partnerships to supplement coverage. For example, Utah’s Premium Partnership for Health Insurance (UPP) is designed to help families pay premiums and can be used as a substitute for CHIP or to assist with CHIP premium payments.

== Future issues ==
In the State of Utah, some issues facing CHIP are in regards to pregnant mothers, whom are presently not covered. Pregnant women with no forms of prenatal care are “more than 3.5 times as likely to have a low birth weight baby—one of the leading causes of infant mortality—and nearly three times as likely to give birth prematurely as other pregnant women”. When authorizing CHIPRA 2009, several states decided to amend their programs to cover pregnant women; Utah did not make that choice.

== Utah children insured ==
On the 10th anniversary of the application of CHIP in 2008, Utah has insured 134,735 children, and that year the average monthly enrollment was 34,588. During FY 2010, the monthly enrollment was at 42,006 and the average cost per child for coverage was $1,812 per year, which is $151 per month.
