= PeachCare =

Health insurance for children in Georgia

PeachCare for Kids is a low-cost health insurance program for children of uninsured, low-income families in the U.S. state of Georgia who do not qualify for Medicaid. It is operated by the Georgia Department of Community Health.

== History ==
In 1997, the United States Department of Health and Human Services (HHS) began the State Children's Health Insurance Program (SCHIP) to cover children from families whose incomes are low but too high for Medicaid. PeachCare for Kids was founded in 1999 as Georgia's SCHIP. As of 2009, an average of 1.4 million Georgians are enrolled.
