= Weekly Republican Address =

The Weekly Republican Address is delivered by a different prominent Republican each week, in response to the weekly address of the president of the United States during a Democratic presidency. When a Republican has held the Presidency, the President delivers the weekly address, such as occurred during 2001–2009 under George W. Bush, and most recently, Donald Trump, 2017-2021.

== 2009 Weekly Republican Address speakers ==
Democrat President Barack Obama inaugurated on January 20. Democrats hold "super majorities" in both Senate and House.

Date	Speakers	State	Position	Notes	Reference(s)
January 9	Mike Pence	Indiana	House	House Republican Conference Chairman	
January 16	Cathy McMorris Rodgers	Washington	House	House Republican Conference Vice-Chair	
January 23	John Boehner	Ohio	House	House Republican Leader	
January 30	Mitch McConnell	Kentucky	Senate	Senate Republican Leader	
February 6	Michael Steele	Maryland	Republican National Committee Chairman	Republican National Committee Chairman	
February 13	Thaddeus McCotter	Michigan	House		
February 20	Dave Camp	Michigan	House	Ways and Means Committee, ranking member	
February 28	Richard Burr	North Carolina	Senate		
March 7	Roy Blunt	Missouri	House		
March 13	Chuck Grassley	Iowa	Senate		
March 20	Haley Barbour	Mississippi	Governor		
March 27	Judd Gregg	New Hampshire	Senate		
April 4	Paul Ryan	Wisconsin	House		
April 10	Tim Pawlenty	Minnesota	Governor		
April 18	Kevin McCarthy	California	House		
April 23	Lamar Alexander	Tennessee	Senate		
May 2	Lynn Jenkins	Kansas	House		
May 8	Kit Bond	Missouri	Senate		
May 16	Charles Boustany	Louisiana	House		
May 22	John Barrasso	Wyoming	Senate		
May 30	Mitch Daniels	Indiana	Governor		
June 6	Jeff Sessions	Alabama	Senate	Senate Judiciary Committee, Chairman	
June 13	Mike Pence	Indiana	House	House Republican Conference Chairman	
June 20	Mitch McConnell	Kentucky	Senate	Senate Republican Leader	
June 27	John Boehner	Ohio	House	House Republican Leader	
July 1	John McCain	Arizona	Senate	2008 Republican presidential nominee	
July 11	Eric Cantor	Virginia	House	House Republican Whip	
July 18	Jon Kyl	Arizona	Senate	Senate Republican Whip	
July 25	Cathy McMorris Rodgers	Washington	House	House Republican Conference Vice-Chair	
August 1	John Thune	South Dakota	Senate		
August 8	Bob McDonnell	Virginia	Governor candidate	Won Governor election in November, later delivered Republican response to 2010 State of the Union Address	
August 15	Orrin Hatch	Utah	Senate		
August 22	Tom Price	Georgia	House		
August 29	Mike Enzi	Wyoming	Senate		
September 5	John Kline	Minnesota	House		
September 12	John Cornyn	Texas	Senate		
September 19	Sue Myrick	North Carolina	House		
September 26	Johnny Isakson	Georgia	Senate		
October 3	Candice Miller	Michigan	House		
October 10	George LeMieux	Florida	Senate		
October 17	Kevin Brady	Texas	House		
October 24	Mike Johanns	Nebraska	Senate		
October 30	John Boehner	Ohio	House	House Republican Leader	
November 7	Haley Barbour	Mississippi	Governor		
November 14	Mark Kirk	Illinois	House		
November 20	Mike Crapo	Idaho	Senate		
November 26	Mike Pence	Indiana	House	House Republican Conference Chairman	
December 5	Carly Fiorina	California	Senate candidate	Would later win primary election, lose general election to incumbent Barbara Boxer	
December 12	Marsha Blackburn	Tennessee	House		
December 18	John McCain	Arizona	Senate	2008 Republican presidential nominee	
December 24	Duncan Hunter	California	House		

== 2010 Weekly Republican Address speakers ==
After the United States elections of 2010, Republicans took back the majority in the House of Representatives, and achieved a net gain in the Senate, decreasing the Democratic majority.

Date	Speakers	State	Position	Notes	Reference(s)
January 2	Mitch McConnell	Kentucky	Senate	Senate Republican Leader	
January 9	Peter King	New York	House		
January 16	Mike Castle	Delaware	House		
January 22	John Boehner	Ohio	House	House Republican Leader	
January 30	Susan Collins	Maine	Senate		
February 6	Jeb Hensarling	Texas	House		
February 13	Lindsey Graham	South Carolina	Senate		
February 20	Dave Camp	Michigan	House		
February 27	Tom Coburn	Oklahoma	Senate		
March 6	Parker Griffith	Alabama	House		
March 13	Scott Brown	Massachusetts	Senate		
March 20	John Boehner	Ohio	House	House Republican Leader	
March 27	Mitch McConnell	Kentucky	Senate	Senate Republican Leader	
April 3	Kevin McCarthy	California	House		
April 10	Jon Kyl	Arizona	Senate	Senate Republican Whip	
April 17	Eric Cantor	Virginia	House	House Republican Whip	
April 24	Kay Bailey Hutchison	Texas	Senate		
May 1	Pete Hoekstra	Michigan	House		
May 7	Richard Shelby	Alabama	Senate		
May 15	Chris Lee	New York	House	Later resigned due to sex scandal, seat won in special election by Democrat Kathy Hochul	
May 22	David Vitter	Louisiana	Senate		
May 29	Kevin McCarthy	California	House		
June 5	Michael Steele	Maryland	Republican National Committee Chairman	Republican National Committee Chairman	
June 12	John Boehner	Ohio	House	House Republican Leader	
June 19	Roger Wicker	Mississippi	Senate		
June 26	Paul Ryan	Wisconsin	House		
July 3	Saxby Chambliss	Georgia	Senate		
July 10	Phil Gingrey	Georgia	House		
July 17	Pat Roberts	Kansas	Senate		
July 24	Mike Pence	Indiana	House		
July 31	Mike Johanns	Nebraska	Senate		
August 7	Peter Roskam	Illinois	House		
August 13	Pat Toomey	Pennsylvania	Senate candidate	Later won general election against challenger Joe Sestak	
August 21	Charles Djou	Hawaii	House		
August 27	Marco Rubio	Florida	Senate candidate	Later won general election against challengers Kendrick Meek and incumbent Governor Charlie Crist	
September 4	Geoff Davis	Kentucky	House		
September 11	Jon Kyl	Arizona	Senate		
September 18	Greg Walden	Oregon	House		
September 25	Kevin McCarthy	California	House		
October 2	Mitch McConnell	Kentucky	Senate	Senate Republican Leader	
October 9	John Barrasso	Wyoming	Senate	Senate Republican Conference Vice-Chair	
October 16	Mike Pence	Indiana	House	House Republican Conference Chairman	
October 23	John Thune	South Dakota	Senate		
October 30	John Boehner	Ohio	House	House Republican Leader	
November 6	Marco Rubio	Florida	Senator-elect		
November 13	Greg Walden	Oregon	House	Majority Transition Chairman	
November 20	Mitch McConnell	Kentucky	Senate	Senate Republican Leader	
November 25	Austin Scott	Georgia	House-elect		
December 4	Mark Kirk	Illinois	House		
December 11	Kristi Noem	South Dakota	House-elect		
December 18	John Cornyn	Texas	Senate		
December 24	Joe Pitts	Pennsylvania	House		

== 2011 Weekly Republican Address speakers ==
After the January 5 inaugurations, all positions won in the November 2010 elections were officially filled.

Date	Speakers	State	Position	Notes	Reference(s)
January 1	Kelly Ayotte	New Hampshire	Senate-elect		
January 7	Eric Cantor	Virginia	House	House Majority Leader	
January 15	Jeff Flake	Arizona	House		
January 22	John Barrasso	Wyoming	Senate		
January 29	Ron Johnson	Wisconsin	Senate		
February 5	Jeb Hensarling	Texas	House		
February 12	Orrin Hatch	Utah	Senate		
February 19	Tom Price	Georgia	House	House Policy committee, Chairman	
February 26	Rob Portman	Ohio	Senate		
March 5	Diane Black	Tennessee	House		
March 12	Lisa Murkowski	Alaska	Senate		
March 19	Jaime Herrera Beutler	Washington	House		
March 26	Bob McDonnell	Virginia	Governor		
April 2	John Boehner	Ohio	House	Speaker of the House	
April 9	Paul Ryan	Wisconsin	House	House Budget Committee, Chairman; earlier delivered Republican response to 2011 State of the Union Address	
April 16	Tom Coburn	Oklahoma	Senate		
April 23	Mike Johanns	Nebraska	Senate		
April 30	James Lankford	Oklahoma	House		
May 7	Scott Brown	Massachusetts	Senate		
May 14	Martha Roby	Alabama	House		
May 21	Kay Bailey Hutchison	Texas	Senate		
May 28	Eric Cantor	Virginia	House	House Majority Leader	
June 3	Lamar Alexander	Tennessee	Senate		
June 11	Adam Kinzinger	Illinois	House		
June 18	John Hoeven	North Dakota	Senate		
June 25	Renee Ellmers	North Carolina	House		
July 2	Dan Coats	Indiana	Senate		
July 9	Cathy McMorris Rodgers	Washington	House	House Republican Conference Vice-Chair	
July 16	Orrin Hatch	Utah	Senate		
July 23	Jeb Hensarling	Texas	House	House Republican Conference Chairman	
July 30	Jon Kyl	Arizona	Senate	Senate Republican Whip	
August 6	Michael Grimm	New York	House		
August 13	Pat Toomey	Pennsylvania	Senate		
August 20	John Kasich	Ohio	Governor		
August 27	Dean Heller	Nevada	Senate		
September 3	Bob Goodlatte	Virginia	House		
September 10	Rudy Giuliani	New York	Mayor	Former New York City mayor	
September 17	Peter Roskam	Illinois	House		
September 24	Susan Collins	Maine	Senate		
October 1	Morgan Griffith	Virginia	House		
October 8	John Thune	South Dakota	Senate		
October 15	Kevin McCarthy	California	House	House Majority Whip	
October 22	Richard Burr	North Carolina	Senate		
October 29	Bobby Schilling	Illinois	House		
November 5	Scott Brown	Massachusetts	Senate		
November 12	Joe Heck	Nevada	House		
November 19	Pat Toomey	Pennsylvania	Senate	Member of the Joint Select Committee on Deficit Reduction	
November 24	Sandy Adams	Florida	House		
December 3	Olympia Snowe	Maine	Senate		
December 10	John Boehner	Ohio	House	Speaker of the House	
December 17	John Barrasso	Wyoming	Senate	Senate Republican Policy Committee Chairman	
December 24	Mike Pence	Indiana	House		
December 31	Johnny Isakson	Georgia	Senate		

== 2012 Weekly Republican Address speakers ==
After the United States elections in 2012, Democrat President Barack Obama defeated Republican nominee Mitt Romney, Democrats increased their majority in the Senate, and Democrats made a net gain in the U.S. House, although Republicans continued to hold the House majority.

Date	Speakers	State	Position	Notes	Reference(s)
January 7	Nan Hayworth	New York	House		
January 14	John Hoeven	North Dakota	Senate		
January 21	Jeb Hensarling	Texas	House	House Republican Conference Chairman	
January 28	Marco Rubio	Florida	Senate		
February 4	Pat Meehan	Pennsylvania	House		
February 11	Bob McDonnell	Virginia	Governor		
February 18	Cathy McMorris Rodgers	Washington	House	House Republican Conference Vice-Chair	
February 25	Kay Bailey Hutchison	Texas	Senate		
March 3	Doc Hastings	Washington	House		
March 10	Jack Dalrymple	North Dakota	Governor		
March 17	Cory Gardner	Colorado	House		
March 24	Mitch McConnell	Kentucky	Senate	Senate Republican Leader	
March 31	John Boehner	Ohio	House	Speaker of the House	
April 7	Mary Fallin	Oklahoma	Governor		
April 14	Fred Upton	Michigan	House		
April 21	Roy Blunt	Missouri	Senate		
April 28	Paul Ryan	Wisconsin	House	House Budget Committee, Chairman	
May 5	Bob Corker	Tennessee	Senate		
May 12	Kristi Noem	South Dakota	House		
May 19	Ron Johnson	Wisconsin	Senate		
May 26	Lynn Jenkins	Kansas	House		
June 2	John Cornyn	Texas	Senate		
June 9	Erik Paulsen	Minnesota	House		
June 16	Scott Walker	Wisconsin	Governor		
June 23	Bill Cassidy	Louisiana	House	Won recall election on June 5	
June 30	John Barrasso	Wyoming	Senate	Supreme Court upheld Affordable Care Act on June 28	
July 7	Ann Marie Buerkle	Ohio	House		
July 14	Rob Portman	New York	Senate		
July 21	John Boehner	Ohio	House	Speaker of the House / speaking on Aurora, Colorado massacre	
July 28	Orrin Hatch	Utah	Senate		
August 4	Eric Cantor	Virginia	House	House Majority Leader	
August 11	Roger Wicker	Mississippi	Senate		
August 18	Vicky Hartzler	Missouri	House		
August 25	Rand Paul	Kentucky	Senate		
September 1	Steve Scalise	Louisiana	House		
September 15	Allen West	Florida	House		
September 29	Vernon Parker	Arizona	House candidate	Lost election to Kyrsten Sinema	
October 6	Reince Priebus	Wisconsin	Republican National Committee Chairman	Republican National Committee Chairman	
October 13	Markwayne Mullin	Oklahoma	House candidate	Won the election	
October 20	Jeff Flake	Arizona	House		
October 27	Ann Wagner	Missouri	House candidate	Won the election	
November 3	Mitt Romney	Massachusetts	Presidential candidate, former Governor of Massachusetts	Lost that week's presidential election to Barack Obama	
November 9	John Boehner	Ohio	House	Speaker of the House, following the preceding week's presidential election loss to Barack Obama	
November 17	Kelly Ayotte	New Hampshire	Senate		
December 1	Orrin Hatch	Utah	Senate		
December 8	Marco Rubio	Florida	Senate		
December 15	None			"House Speaker John Boehner (R-OH), citing respect for the victims of the Newtown, CT shooting, announced that there will be no Weekly Republican Address for Saturday, December 15, 2012: "There will be no Weekly Republican Address this weekend so that President Obama can speak for the entire nation at this time of mourning. I join the president – and all Americans – in sending prayers and condolences to the victims' loved ones."	
December 22	John Boehner	Ohio	House	Speaker of the House	
December 29	Roy Blunt	Missouri	Senate		

== 2013 Weekly Republican Address speakers ==
After the United States elections in 2012, Democrat President Barack Obama defeated Republican nominee Mitt Romney, Democrats increased their majority in the Senate, and Democrats made a net gain in the U.S. House, although Republicans continued to hold the House majority.

Date	Speakers	State	Position	Notes	Reference(s)
January 12	Deb Fischer	Nebraska	Senate		
January 21	John Thune	South Dakota	Senate		
February 9	Lisa Murkowski	Alaska	Senate		
February 23	John Hoeven	Idaho	Senate		
March 9	Jeff Sessions	Alabama	Senate		
March 23	Mike Lee	Utah	Senate		
April 6	Sam Brownback	Kansas	Governor		
April 20	Tim Scott	South Carolina	Senate		
May 4	Pat McCrory	North Carolina	Senate		
May 25	Jim Inhofe	Oklahoma	Senate		
June 1	Sean Parnell	Arkansas	Senate		
June 15	Lamar Alexander	Tennessee	Senate		
June 29	Pat Roberts	Kansas	Senate		
July 13	Mike Enzi	Wyoming	Senate		
August 3	Susan Collins	Maine	Senate		
August 10	Tim Scott	South Carolina	Senate		
August 24	Mike Pence	Indiana	Senate		
September 7	John Barrasso	Wyoming	Senate		
September 21	Brian Sandoval	Nevada	Governor		
October 5	John Cornyn	Texas	Senate		
October 19	Ken Cuccinelli	Virginia	Attorney General		
November 2	Dan Coats	Indiana	Senate		
November 16	Ron Johnson	Wisconsin	Senate		
November 28	Lindsey Graham	South Carolina	Senate		
December 14	Pat Toomey	Pennsylvania	Senate		
December 24	Jim Risch	Idaho	Senate		

== 2014 Weekly Republican Address speakers ==
Date	Speakers	State	Position	Notes	Reference(s)
January 12	Thad Cochran	Mississippi	Senate		
January 21	Roy Blunt	Missouri	Senate		
February 8	Richard Burr	North Carolina	Senate		
February 22	Tom Cotton	Arkansas	House		
March 8	Rob Portman	Ohio	Senate		
March 22	Rick Snyder	Michigan	Governor		
April 5	Tim Scott	South Carolina	Senate		
April 17	Lamar Alexander	Tennessee	Senate		
May 3	Marco Rubio	Florida	Senate		
May 17	John McCain	Arizona	Senate		
May 31	Mike Enzi	Wyoming	Senate		
June 14	Tom Coburn	Oklahoma	Senate		
November 27	Tom Cotton	Arkansas	Senate		
December 13	Tim Scott	South Carolina	Senate		
December 25	James Lankford	Oklahoma	Senate		

== 2015 Weekly Republican Address speakers ==
Date	Speakers	State	Position	Notes	Reference(s)
January 10	John Hoeven	North Dakota	Senate		
January 24	Lisa Murkowski	Alaska	Senate		
February 7	Rob Portman	Ohio	Senate		
February 21	Ron Johnson	Wisconsin	Senate		
March 7	Chuck Grassley	Iowa	Senate		
March 21	Mike Enzi	Wyoming	Senate		
April 4	Richard Burr	North Carolina	Senate		
April 18	Mark Kirk	Illinois	Senate		
May 2	Johnny Isakson	Georgia	Senate		
May 16	John McCain	Arizona	Senate		
May 30	Deb Fischer	Nebraska	Senate		
June 13	Roy Blunt	Missouri	Senate		
June 27	John Boozman	Arkansas	Senate		
July 11	Lamar Alexander	Tennessee	Senate		
July 25	Jim Inhofe	Oklahoma	Senate		
August 8	Bob Corker	Tennessee	Senate		
August 22	John Thune	South Dakota	Senate		
September 5	Patrick Toomey	Pennsylvania	Senate		
September 19	Shelley Moore Capito	West Virginia	Senate		
October 3	John Barrasso	Wyoming	Senate		
October 17	Patrick Toomey	Pennsylvania	Senate		
October 31	Lisa Murkowski	Alaska	Senate		
November 14	Steve Daines	Montana	Senate		
November 26	Mike Lee	Utah	Senate		
December 19	Mitch McConnell	Kentucky	Senate		
December 24	Mike Crapo	Idaho	Senate		

== 2016 Weekly Republican Address speakers ==
Date	Speakers	State	Position	Notes	Reference(s)
January 9	John Hoeven	North Dakota	Senate		
January 23	Lisa Murkowski	Alaska	Senate		
February 20	Cory Gardner	Colorado	Senate		
March 5	Kelly Ayotte	New Hampshire	Senate		
March 19	Thom Tillis	North Carolina	Senate		
April 2	Richard Burr	North Carolina	Senate		
April 16	Tom Cotton	Arkansas	Senate		
April 30	John McCain	Arizona	Senate		
May 14	Dan Sullivan	Alaska	Senate		
May 28	Joni Ernst	Iowa	Senate		
June 10	Cory Gardner	Colorado	Senate		
June 25	Richard Burr	North Carolina	Senate		
July 9	Patrick Toomey	Pennsylvania	Senate		
July 29	Rob Portman	Ohio	Senate		
August 13	Chuck Grassley	Iowa	Senate		
August 27	Lamar Alexander	Tennessee	Senate		
October 22	Thom Tillis	North Carolina	Senate		
November 19	Todd Young	Indiana	Senate		
December 3	John Barrasso	Wyoming	Senate		
December 17	Patrick Toomey	Pennsylvania	Senate		
December 31	Cory Gardner	Colorado	Senate		

== 2017 Weekly Republican Address speakers ==
With Donald Trump winning the United States elections in 2016, Republicans ended their response videos of the Weekly Address as they now hold the presidency and control of both houses in Congress. Republicans only made one response video for 2017, as Trump began holding a weekly presidential address after his inauguration. Trump started giving out Weekly Addresses as President on January 28, while the Democrats started their addresses the day after the Inauguration on January 21, beginning with Senate Minority Leader Chuck Schumer of New York.

Date	Speakers	State	Position	Notes	Reference(s)
January 14	Deb Fischer	Nebraska	Senate	Last Weekly Address as the Opposition	

== 2021 Weekly Republican Address speakers ==
It was resumed upon Trump’s loss of re-election to Joe Biden in the 2020 election.

It has been discontinued as of January 2025.

== See also ==
- Weekly Democratic Address - Democratic counterpart during a Republican presidency
- Weekly address of the president of the United States
