= Graeme Frost =

American student (born 1995)

Graeme Frost (born 1995) came to public attention in 2007 as a then seventh-grade student from Baltimore who gave the United States Democratic Party weekly radio address on September 28, 2007, promoting the State Children's Health Insurance Program (SCHIP) as a living example of someone helped by the program.

== Radio address ==
Graeme suffered a brain stem and motor cortex injury and his sister Gemma suffered a cranial fracture from a car accident. Graeme and Gemma received treatment for their injuries under the SCHIP program. In the radio address, Graeme spoke on the importance of the SCHIP program. US President George W. Bush vetoed the expansion of SCHIP on October 3, 2007. In the radio address Graeme said that "if it weren't for CHIP, I might not be here today. ... We got the help we needed because we had health insurance for us through the CHIP program. But there are millions of kids out there who don't have CHIP, and they wouldn't get the care that my sister and I did if they got hurt. ... I just hope the President will listen to my story and help other kids to be as lucky as me."

== Criticism ==
Following his radio address, the Frost family became a target for criticism from the right, including from media personalities Michelle Malkin, the blogs of the magazines National Review and Weekly Standard, and Republican House Minority Leader John Boehner. Time magazine wrote that Graeme Frost had been swiftboated and that the blogger "Icwhatudo" began the criticism in a post on the website Free Republic:

"One has to wonder that if time and money can be found to remodel a home, send kids to exclusive private schools, purchase commercial property and run your own business ... maybe money can be found for other things," the blogger wrote. "Maybe Dad should drop his woodworking hobby and get a real job that offers health insurance rather than making people like me (also with 4 kids in a 600sf smaller house and tuition $16,000 less per kid and no commercial property ownership) pay for it in my taxes."

The conservative writer Mark Steyn responded, "A two-property three-car family does not demonstrate the need for entitlement expansion." He reported that the Frosts "have a 3,000-square-foot (280 m^{2}) home plus a second commercial property with a combined value of over $400,000, and three vehicles – a new Chevy Suburban, a Volvo SUV, and a Ford F-250 pickup."

== Support ==
The journalist E. J. Dionne defended the Frost family by citing precise current values of their home and commercial property and commenting that criticism of a 12-year-old should be beyond political discourse. The columnist Paul Krugman wrote, "The Graeme Frost case is a perfect illustration of the modern right-wing political machine at work, and in particular its routine reliance on character assassination in place of honest debate."

=== Family response ===
The Frost family said the criticisms were factually inaccurate, that the total family income is $45,000-$50,000 per year, that the children depend on financial aid for schooling, the business has no employees and cannot afford health insurance, and that the family home was purchased in 1990 for $55,000. The Baltimore Sun asked the family to verify their claimed income but they declined.

Graeme's parents appeared on Countdown with Keith Olbermann on October 15, 2007, to defend their position.

=== Political comments ===
ABC News reported that Jim Manley, a spokesman for Harry Reid, charged that GOP aides were complicit in spreading disparaging information about the Frosts. WHAS-TV News reported that Don Stewart, aide to Mitch McConnell, has admitted that he sent an email to Washington reporters, urging them to look into Graeme Frost. Stewart also admitted to telling Senator McConnell of his role the day before McConnell was interviewed by WHAS11, denying that his office had had any role in attempting to defame the Frost family.
