= TexCare =

Public-private partnership to raise awareness of health insurance for children in Texas

TexCare is a public-private partnership developed by the State of Texas to raise awareness of health insurance options available for children, and to help parents in Texas obtain and use affordable coverage for their uninsured children (ages 0–19). The Texas Health and Human Services Commission operates the program. It was launched in May 2000.

== Insurance programs ==
TexCare offers two separate children's health insurance programs with benefits packages that cover a full range of services including regular checkups, immunizations, prescription drugs, lab tests, X-rays, hospital visits, and more.
