= Supply-side progressivism =

Political ideology

Supply-side progressivism, also called supply-side liberalism, is a political ideology that emphasizes increasing the supply of essential goods and services to make them more abundant and affordable in order to achieve progressive outcomes. Supply-side progressivism holds that certain regulations artificially restrict the supply and drive up costs of essential goods and services, such as housing, healthcare, and higher education while other regulations, such as antitrust law, need to be implemented or enforced to encourage market competition and innovation. They also advocate for more investment in research and development for technologies such as sustainable energy sources in order to increase abundance and reduce costs over time.

== History ==
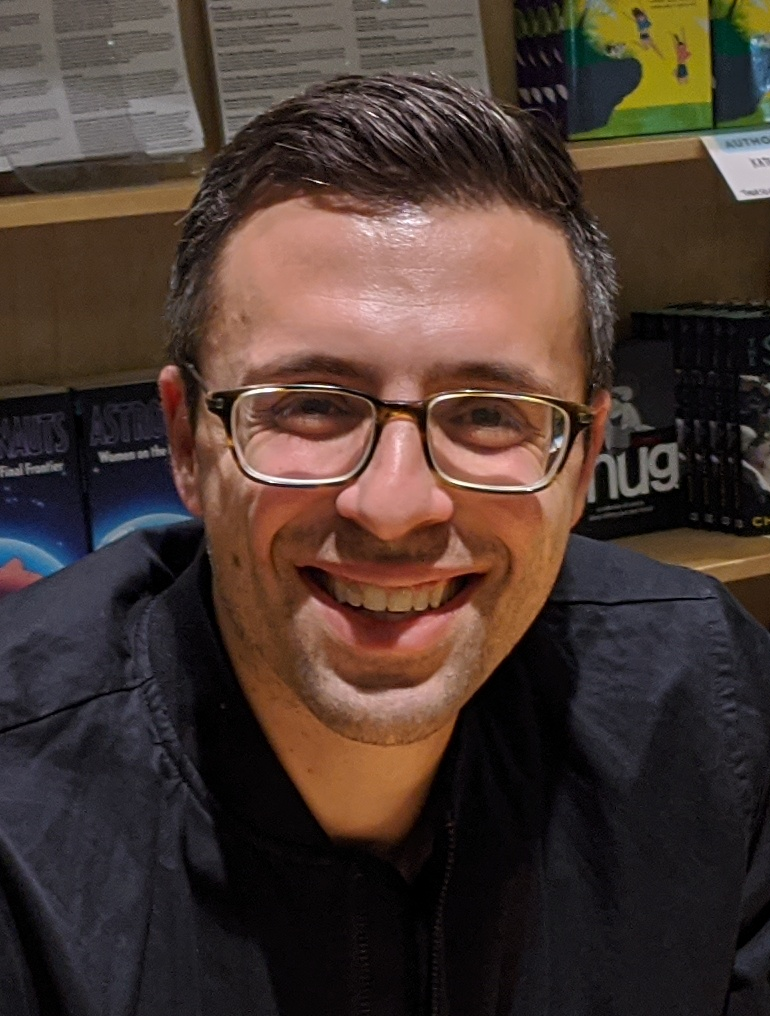
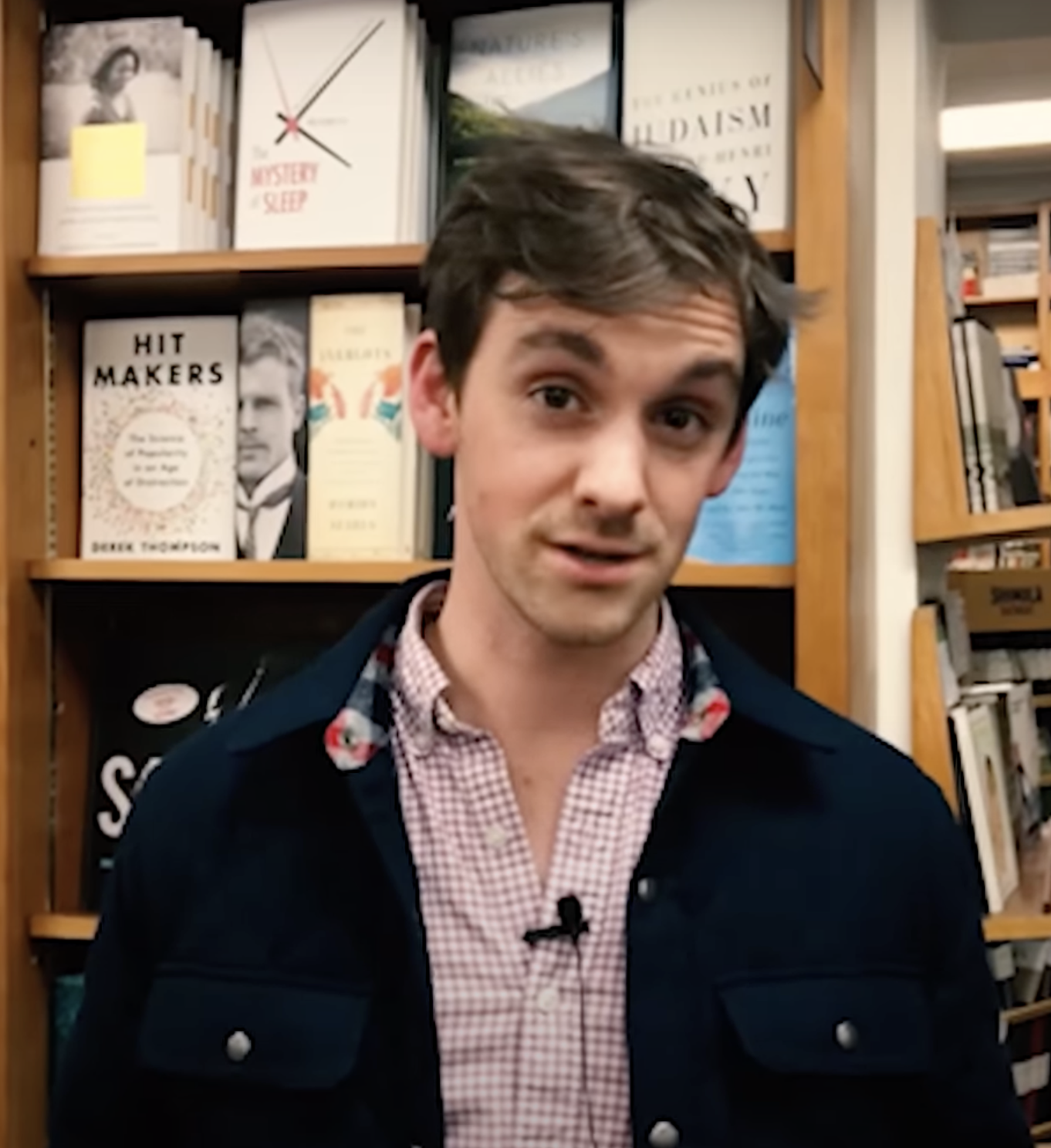
Ezra Klein and Derek Thompson, who wrote respective op-ed pieces in advocating for the abundance agenda, before publishing the book Abundance in 2025.

In the United States, supply-side economics has historically been categorized as right-wing, and used to justify cutting taxes for the wealthy and reducing government regulations.

In the early 2010s, Miles Kimball coined the term "supply-side liberalism" with the launch of his blog, "Confessions of a Supply-Side Liberal". Over the next decade, he covered applications of supply-side liberalism on topics such as immigration, as well as housing. In 2017, Neil Irwin of the New York Times wrote about increasing the US labor pool in his article "Supply-Side Economics, but for Liberals", including via the earned income tax credit and child-care subsidies.

During the COVID-19 pandemic, media attention for supply-side progressivism increased due to pandemic-related shortages. Matthew Yglesias wrote about supply-side interventions in decreasing cost and increasing access to healthcare. The Niskanen Center published a report about "cost-disease socialism", expanding on Baumol's cost disease, citing examples in healthcare, higher education, housing affordability, and childcare where supply-side solutions can be impactful. This was followed by a New York Times opinion piece by Ezra Klein advocating for Democrats to incorporate supply-side progressivism into their strategy, and a piece in The Atlantic by Derek Thompson about what he called "the abundance agenda", his "simple plan to solve all of America's problems". In 2022, Klein later wrote another New York Times opinion piece, advocating that it replace what he described as "everything bagel liberalism".

In 2021, Thompson started writing a column for The Atlantic about supply-side progressivism, called Work in Progress. In January 2022, a think tank that supports supply-side progressivism, the Institute for Progress, was launched, funded by Open Philanthropy and Tyler Cowen's Emergent Ventures. In October 2024, a conference called Abundance 2024 was organized with support from oil and tech companies. In 2025, Klein and Thompson published Abundance, which argues for the implementation of an Abundance Agenda that better manages tradeoffs between regulations and societal advancement.

== Approach ==
Conventional progressivism focuses on policies that redistribute wealth or subsidize access to basic goods, such as universal healthcare and housing vouchers. By contrast, supply-side progressivism aims to create more of these goods and services and make them more widely available.

=== Reducing regulatory restriction of supply ===
Supply-side progressives criticize regulations that constrain the supply of essential goods and services. Examples include zoning laws and building permit requirements that impede the building of new housing and infrastructure, as well as limits on doctor residency training positions and immigration.

=== Building state capacity ===
Supply-side progressives support strengthening the civil service to plan government projects. For example, a reliance on private consultants in planning is often cited as a contributor to high transit infrastructure costs in the United States. In contrast to traditional supply-side economics, supply-side progressives view enhanced state capacity as beneficial to increasing the supply of public goods and services.

=== Encouraging innovation ===
Supply-side progressives emphasize innovation as a way to increase manufacturing capacity and throughput of existing goods, and to create new goods to help meet demand. This can come in the form of research, development, or implementation sponsored directly by the government, and prizes provided to people or companies who solve specific problems. Some supply-side progressives argue that increasing the supply of high-skilled immigrants will encourage innovation.

== Applications ==
=== Housing ===
Supply-side progressivism attributes the high cost of housing in many coastal cities to regulations such as zoning laws that prevent the construction of larger apartment buildings with more homes. Klein writes that, while progressives have long advocated for housing affordability, they have not until recently prioritized increasing housing production. In 2021, California banned single-family zoning. California also has a Housing Element Act that mandates that cities build housing for different income levels every year. Houston does not have land-use zoning, but they have a building code with height restrictions.

=== Healthcare ===
In healthcare, the supply of doctors is restricted by limiting the number of doctor residency-training programs, increasing barriers for immigrant doctors to practice, and preventing nurses from providing certain medical services. During the COVID-19 pandemic, the supply of vaccines and tests for COVID-19 were restricted by the FDA, who were slow in approving development and manufacturing. Thompson advocated federal action to ramp up vaccine production capacity for new variants, "creating a super-team of virus hunters to monitor viral strains around the world", and "an Operation Warp Speed" for increasing vaccine manufacturing capacity globally. One group of researchers estimate that "installed capacity for 3 billion annual vaccine courses has a global benefit of $17.4 trillion, over $5800 per course." Klein suggests allocating more government money for basic research and drug trials, as well as prize money for discovering treatments for specific conditions. Bernie Sanders has proposed legislation for such prizes. Yglesias said that government funding is also necessary to slow the decline in healthcare access in rural and low-income urban areas.

=== Energy ===
Supply-side progressives push for energy abundance rather than energy conservation, noting that periods of accelerated human progress stem from energy abundance. They say this can be done through government investment in research and development and scale-up of new energy technology, especially in the clean energy sector. Beyond neutralizing climate change concerns with clean energy, Rachel Pritzker wrote in the Stanford Social Innovation Review that energy abundance could support energy-intensive environmental mitigation projects such as desalination plants for water treatment or plasma gasification for waste treatment.

Advocates say that government action to invest in clean energy without action to lift supply-side restrictions results in "cost-disease environmentalism". An example they give is that clean energy technology has been stymied by regulatory difficulties in acquiring building permits for solar or wind plants. Derek Thompson has pointed to nuclear power plants as an affected clean energy technology, with the US closing "more nuclear-power plants than we've opened this century", despite it being "99.6 percent greener ... and 99.7 percent safer". Matthew Yglesias has criticized the regulatory infrastructure around energy for favoring oil and gas drilling, both of which are exempt from most environmental reviews.

=== Transportation ===
Similar concerns also affect the country's ability to build and maintain transportation infrastructure. Thompson said that, due to the National Environmental Policy Act, "endless and expensive impact analyses and environmental reviews have ground our infrastructure construction to a halt. From 1900 to 1904, New York City built and opened 28 subway stations. One hundred years later, the city needed about 17 years to build and open just three new stations along Second Avenue." Klein has pointed out that other countries with stronger unions protections than America have completed transit projects more quickly and less costly.

== Reception ==
The abundance agenda has had a divisive effect on American left-wing politics. Its proponents, mostly moderate or centrist politicians, identify it as "key to prosperity for the American people and to enduring power for the liberal coalition" while its opponents, mostly from the more progressive left, criticize it as "a scheme to infiltrate the Democratic Party by 'corporate-aligned interests'" or a rebranding of neoliberalism. Jonathan Chait identified this divide as a "diametric conflict" between strands of American progressivism: "The progressive-activist network believes that local activists should have more legal power to block new housing and energy infrastructure. The abundance agenda is premised on taking that power away." Writing for The Atlantic in 2023, Reihan Salam indicated ideological sympathy for tenets of supply-side liberalism, but argued its proponents misunderstand the nature of the U.S. liberal coalition, thus thwarting its viability as a political project. Writing for New York, Eric Levitz believes that many of the critics of this ideology misunderstand several aspects, such as the role of unions.

== See also ==
- Atari Democrat – 1980s–1990s tech-friendly moderate U.S. Democratic politicians
- YIMBY – Movement in support of infrastructure development
- Cost disease socialism – Proposed concept to describe an economic pattern
