= Build America Caucus =

US congressional caucus

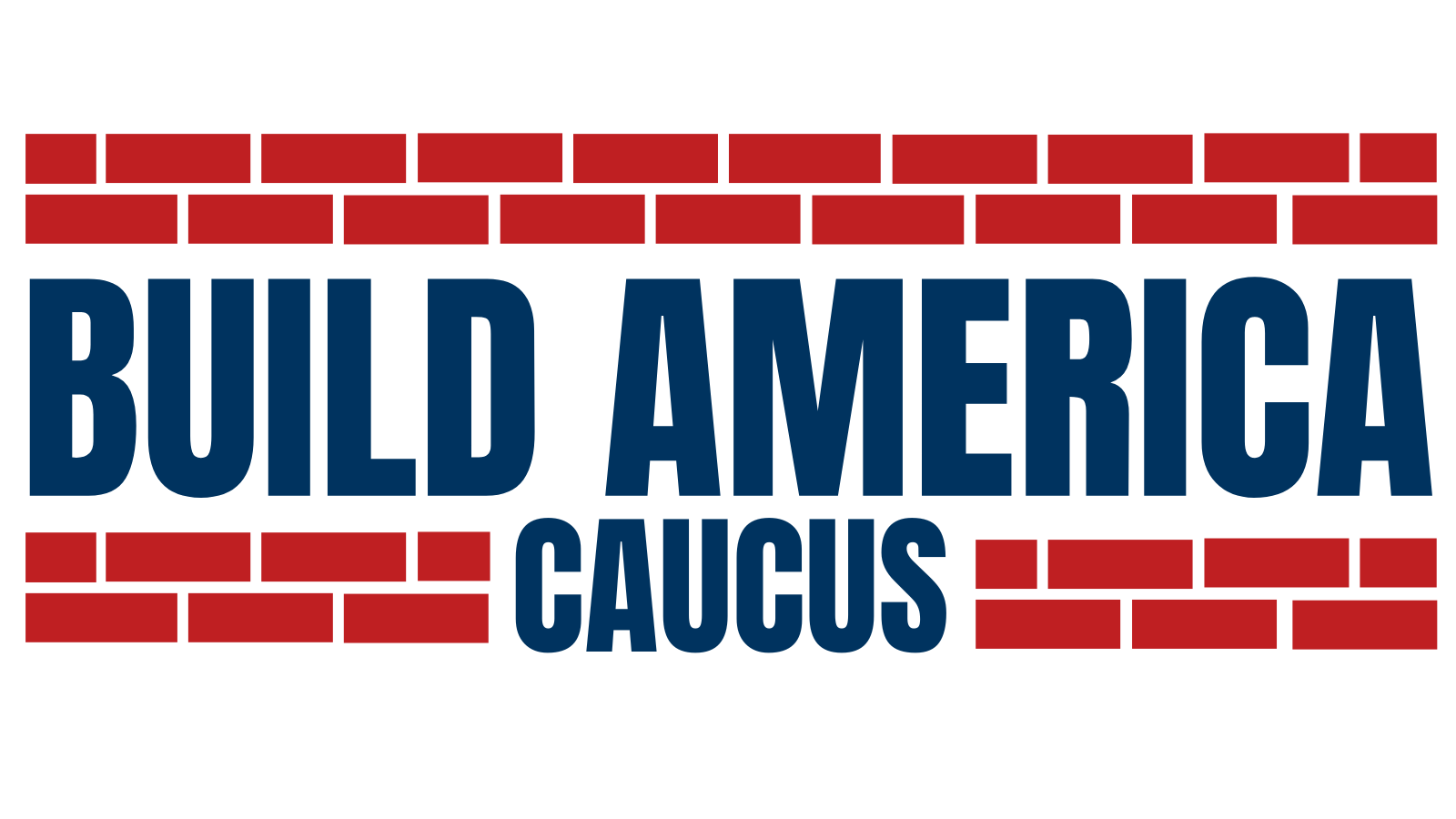
- Chair: Josh Harder
- Co-Chair: Celeste Maloy
- Founded: May 9, 2025; 18 months ago
- Ideology: Centrism; Bipartisanship; Pro-abundance; Pro-housing affordability Deregulation
- Seats in House Democratic Caucus: 22 / 213
- Seats in House Republican Caucus: 21 / 220
- Seats in the House: 43 / 435

The Build America Caucus is a bipartisan caucus in the United States House of Representatives. The members of the Build America Caucus support the "abundance movement", which came to prominence following the publishing of Abundance, a New York Times Bestseller co-authored by Ezra Klein and Derek Thompson.

== History ==
Following their losses in the 2024 United States elections, where polling showed that the cost of living was the most salient issue for voters, Democrats warmed to the idea of embracing deregulation to decrease housing and energy costs. As deregulation is traditionally a Republican issue, this created room for a new bipartisan focus on permitting reform.

The Build America Caucus was founded in the 119th Congress, following the collapse of the bipartisan Energy Permitting Reform Act of 2024 at the end of the 118th Congress. The caucus officially launched on May 9, 2025, under chair Rep. Josh Harder, composed mostly of relative newcomers to bipartisan permitting reform negotiations.

In the 119th Congress, the Build America Caucus endorsed legislation to aid housing construction, which was later passed into law, and released a bipartisan national agenda focused on affordability in housing, healthcare, childcare and education, and energy, and progress in science, infrastructure, and federal government efficiency.

== Members ==
Build America Caucus in the 119th Congress: Democratic Build America Caucus member Republican Build America Caucus member

As of October 27, 2026, the Build America Caucus has 43 members, composed of 22 Democrats and 21 Republicans.

=== Current members ===
Member name (Party)	Hometown	District	Assumed office
Jake Auchincloss	Newton, MA	MA-4	January 3, 2021
Don Bacon	Papillion, NE	NE-2	January 3, 2017
Gus Bilirakis	Palm Harbor, FL	FL-12	January 3, 2007
Rob Bresnahan	Dallas Township, PA	PA-8	January 3, 2025
Nikki Budzinski	Springfield, IL	IL-13	January 3, 2023
Buddy Carter	Pooler, GA	GA-1	January 3, 2015
Janelle Bynum	Happy Valley, OR	OR-5	January 3, 2025
Sharice Davids	Roeland Park, KS	KS-3	January 3, 2019
Chuck Edwards	Flat Rock, NC	NC-11	January 3, 2023
Laura Friedman	Glendale, CA	CA-30	January 3, 2025
Maggie Goodlander	Nashua, NH	NH-2	January 3, 2025
Adam Gray	Merced, CA	CA-13	January 3, 2025
Josh Harder	Tracy, CA	CA-9	January 3, 2019
Jim Himes	Cos Cob, CT	CT-4	January 3, 2009
Steven Horsford	Las Vegas, NV	NV-4	January 3, 2019
Erin Houchin	Salem, IN	IN-9	January 3, 2025
Jeff Hurd	Grand Junction, CO	CO-3	January 3, 2025
Jen Kiggans	Virginia Beach, VA	VA-2	January 3, 2023
Young Kim	La Habra, CA	CA-40	January 3, 2021
Mike Lawler	Pearl River, NY	NY-17	January 3, 2023
Sam Liccardo	San Jose, CA	CA-16	January 3, 2025
Ryan Mackenzie	Lower Macungie, PA	PA-7	January 3, 2025
Seth Magaziner	Cranston, RI	RI-2	January 3, 2023
Nicole Malliotakis	Staten Island, NY	NY-11	January 3, 2021
Celeste Maloy	Cedar City, UT	UT-2	November 28, 2023
Mike McCaul	Austin, TX	TX-10	January 3, 2005
Richard McCormick	Suwanee, GA	GA-7	January 3, 2023
Kristen McDonald Rivet	Bay City, MI	MI-8	January 3, 2025
Blake Moore	Salt Lake City, UT	UT-1	January 3, 2021
Joe Neguse	Lafayette, CO	CO-2	January 3, 2019
Dan Newhouse	Sunnyside, WA	WA-4	January 3, 2015
Jay Obernolte	Big Bear Lake, CA	CA-23	January 3, 2021
Scott Peters	San Diego, CA	CA-50	January 3, 2013
Brittany Pettersen	Lakewood, CO	CO-7	January 3, 2023
Mike Quigley	Chicago, IL	IL-5	April 7, 2009
Pat Ryan	Gardiner, NY	NY-18	September 13, 2022
Andrea Salinas	Tigard, OR	OR-6	January 3, 2023
Mike Simpson	Burley, ID	ID-2	January 3, 1999
Haley Stevens	Birmingham, MI	MI-11	January 3, 2019
Ritchie Torres	Bronx, NY	NY-15	January 3, 2021
David Valadao	Hanford, CA	CA-22	January 3, 2021
George Whitesides	Agua Dulce, CA	CA-27	January 3, 2025
Robert Wittman	Montross, VA	VA-1	December 11, 2007

== Legislation ==
The Build America Caucus has endorsed several pieces of federal legislation focused on reforming permitting processes to reduce regulatory slowdowns.

=== 119th Congress ===
==== Passed into law ====
- 21st Century ROAD to Housing Act (Sponsored by Rep. French Hill), H.R. 6644
- License to Drill Act (Sponsored by Rep. Mike Kennedy), H.R. 7831

==== Proposed ====
- Fix Our Forests Act (Sponsored by Rep. Bruce Westerman), H.R. 471
- CLEAN Act (Sponsored by Rep. Russ Fulcher), H.R. 1687
- Affordable HOMES Act (Sponsored by Rep. Erin Houchin), H.R. 5184
- Geothermal Energy Advancement Act (Sponsored by Rep. Jeff Hurd), H.R. 5631
- Bipartisan American Affordability and Jobs Act of 2026 (Sponsored by Sen. Shelley Moore Capito), S. 5653

== See also ==
- Congressional YIMBY Caucus
- Climate Solutions Caucus
- Problem Solvers Caucus
