= Steven Teles =

American political scientist

- Occupation: Political scientist
- Employers: Johns Hopkins University; Niskanen Center

Steven M. Teles is an American political scientist. He is a professor at Johns Hopkins University, as well as a senior fellow at the Niskanen Center. Notable writings include The Captured Economy: How The Powerful Enrich Themselves, Slow Down Growth and Increase Inequality with Brink Lindsey, Prison Break: Why Conservatives Turned Against Mass Incarceration with David Dagan, and The Rise of the Conservative Legal Movement, as well as the original paper about Cost disease socialism with Samuel Hammond and Daniel Takash. He is also known for coining the term "kludgeocracy" to describe the phenomenon of overly-complicated governmental solutions to social problems.
