= Work in Progress (disambiguation) =

Work in progress or work in process is the general description of a partially finished project.

Work in Progress may also refer to:

== Film ==
- A Work in Progress (film), Neil Peart's documentary film of the recording of Rush's Test for Echo album
- Work in Progress (1951 film), a British short documentary

== Literature ==
- Works in Progress, a newsletter and magazine associated with the progress studies movement.
- Work in Progress (book), by Michael Eisner
- A Work in Progress (book), a 2015 memoir by YouTuber Connor Franta
- Work in Progress, the name under which the first installments of Finnegans Wake by James Joyce were originally published
- Work in Progress, the early draft of a book by Cliff Holden (1999)

== Music ==
- Work in Progress (album), a 2002 album by Man Alive
- Works in Progress (Kansas album), 2006
- Works in Progress (Tim Buckley album), 1999
- Work in Progress, a 2011 album by U.K. Subs
- Work in Progress, a 1998 album by Jeff & Sheri Easter
- Work in Progress, a 1990 album by Edgar Meyer
- Work in Progress, a 1984 EP by Robert Wyatt included in the album Mid-Eighties
- A Work in Progress, a 2003 album by Myka 9
- "Work in Progress" (song), a 2002 song by Alan Jackson
- Work in Progress (EP), a 2024 EP by Holly Humberstone
  - "Work in Progress", a 2024 song by Holly Humberstone from her EP Work in Progress

== Other ==
- Work in Progress (TV series), an American comedy series broadcast from 2019
- Joe Frank: Work in Progress, a radio program by Joe Frank broadcast from 1986 through 1992
