= Special District Fairness and Accessibility Act =

- Long title: To require the Director of the Office of Management and Budget to issue guidance to agencies requiring special districts to be recognized as local government for the purpose of Federal financial assistance determinations.
- Announced in: the 118th United States Congress
- Number of co-sponsors: 22

Legislative history
- Introduced in the House of Representatives as H.R. 7525 by Pat Fallon (R‑TX), Brittany Pettersen (D‑NJ) on March 5, 2024; Committee consideration by House Committee on Oversight and Accountability, Senate Committee on Homeland Security and Governmental Affairs; Passed the House of Representatives on May 6, 2024 (352 - 27)

The Special District Fairness and Accessibility Act (initially the Special District Grant Accessibility Act) is a proposed bill of the United States Congress that, if passed, would codify a formal definition of Special districts under federal law. It would direct the Office of Management and Budget to issue guidance requiring federal agencies to treat special districts as local government units when deciding appropriations. The bill was passed by the House on a roll call vote on May 6, 2024, but the did not progress in the Senate Committee on Homeland Security and Government Affairs. The bill was retitled and reintroduced in the 119th Congress, and was sent to the House Committee on Oversight and Government Reform.
