= Hagen Krämer =

German Economist

Hagen Krämer (born 1963) is a German economist. Since 1999 he is Professor of Economics at Karlsruhe University of Applied Sciences.

== Life ==
From 1983 to 1989 he studied economics at the University of Bremen and the New School for Social Research in New York. In 1995 he received his doctorate in economics from the University of Bremen. Following that, he worked for several years at Daimler-Benz AG, at Daimler-Benz InterServices AG and at DaimlerChrysler Services AG in Stuttgart and Berlin. In 2003 he was one of the founding members of the Keynes Gesellschaft. He was visiting professor at the German Institute for Economic Research, the Macroeconomic Policy Institute (IMK), the Fraunhofer Institute for Systems and Innovations Research ISI and at the University of Graz. Additionally, he was visiting professor at the Graduate Faculty of the New School for Social Research and at the School of Political Science and Economics at Meiji University in Tokio.

He is member of the committee for the History of Economic Thought and the committee for Economic Policy of the Verein für Socialpolitik. Further, he is member of the Council of the European Society for the History of Economic Thought (ESHET). Between 2018 and 2024 he was a Member of the Council of ESHET. Since 2025, he has been the Chair of the German Keynes Society.

== Research ==
Hagen Krämer focuses his research on the theory and empirics of income- and wealth distribution, the services economy and digitalization and on the history of economic thought. He is co-author of numerous monographs and publications in academic journals and anthologies. In his book Sparen und Investieren im 21. Jahrhundert. Die Große Divergenz which he has written with Carl Christian von Weizsäcker he addressed the role of the state in times of increasing saving propensities and diminishing investment propensities. In 2021 Carl Christian von Weizsäcker and Hagen Krämer published with Saving and Investment in the Twenty-First Century. The Great Divergence open access an extended and updated English version of the book. Together with Christian Proaño and Mark Setterfield, he published the book Capitalism, Inclusive Growth, and Social Protection. Inherent Contradiction or Achievable Vision? in 2023. In this book a theoretical approach to support a progressive economic policy is developed. This approach combines (MKS-System) central elements of Marx (distributional conflicts), Keynes (effective demand) and Schumpeter (Innovations). In addition, Hagen Krämer researches on technological progress, services and structural change. Especially, he deals with the cost disease of services (Baumol's cost disease).

== Publications (Selection) ==
- ed. with Harald Hagemann: Keynes 2.0 – Perspektiven einer modernen keynesianischen Wirtschaftstheorie und Wirtschaftspolitik. Metropolis, Marburg 2011.
- ed. with Heinz D. Kurz und Hans-Michael Trautwein: Macroeconomics and the History of Economic Thought (= Routledge Studies in the History of Economics, Vol. 144). Routledge, London 2012.
- with Carl Christian von Weizsäcker: Sparen und Investieren im 21. Jahrhundert. Die Große Divergenz. Springer, Heidelberg and Berlin 2019.
- with Carl Christian von Weizsäcker: Saving and Investment in the 21st Century. The Great Divergence. Springer, Cham 2021. doi.org/10.1007/978-3-030-75031-2_7
- ed. with Johannes Schmidt: Wirtschaftspolitische Beratung in der Krise, Schriften der Keynes-Gesellschaft, Vol. 15. Metropolis, Marburg 2021.
- with Jochen Hartwig: The Growth Disease at 50 – Baumol after Oulton, in: Structural Change and Economic Dynamics, Vol. 51, December 2019, pp. 463–471, doi:10.1016/j.strueco.2019.02.006
- with Jochen Hartwig: Baumol's Cost Disease in Times of Rising Income Inequality, in: Research in the History of Economic Thought and Methodology, Vol. 40B, pp. 27–48. doi.org/10.1108/S0743-41542022000040B004
- with Christian Proaño und Mark Setterfield: Capitalism, Inclusive Growth, and Social Protection: Inherent Contradiction or Achievable Vision?, Edward Elgar Publishing, Cheltenham (UK), Northampton (MA). doi.org/10.4337/9781786433077
- What are Services? Misconceptions and Neglected Insights from the Productivity Controversy in the Classical Period, in: European Journal of the History of Economic Thought, Vol. 30, No. 6. doi.org/10.1080/09672567.2023.2292804
