= David Rein (politician) =

American politician

Member-elect of the Colorado House of Representatives from the 28th district
- Assuming office January 2027
- Succeeding: Sheila Lieder

Personal details
- Party: Democratic
- Education: University of Minnesota; University of Iowa
- Website: www.reinforcolorado.com

David Rein is an American politician. A member of the Democratic Party, he is the member-elect for the 28th district of the Colorado House of Representatives. Rein is a lawyer. He is a city council member in Lakewood, Colorado.
