= Revenue theory of cost =

Economic theory of universities

The revenue theory of cost, also referred to as Bowen's law or Bowen's rule, is an economic theory explaining the financial trends of American universities. It was formulated by American economist Howard R. Bowen (1908–1989), who served as president of Grinnell College, the University of Iowa, and the Claremont Graduate School.

The theory posits that costs at universities are almost entirely a function of revenue: universities raise as much money as they possibly can and then spend nearly the entirety of it in an attempt to increase prestige and quality of education. It follows from this that if universities are able to increase their revenue streams, costs will also rise, creating a revenue-to-cost spiral. The revenue theory of cost has thus been offered as an explanation for rising costs at universities, including rising tuition.

== Description ==
The basis of Bowen's revenue theory of cost is the primacy of university revenue in determining university spending:

...at any given time, the unit cost of education is determined by the amount of revenues currently available for education relative to enrollment. The statement is more than a tautology, as it expresses the fundamental fact that unit cost [i.e., the cost of education] is determined by hard dollars of revenue and only indirectly and distantly by considerations of need, technology, efficiency, and market wages and prices.

Bowen further argues that not only are costs determined by revenue, but that universities tend towards higher costs. He lays out four basic characteristics of universities:

1. "The dominant goals of institutions are educational excellence, prestige, and influence;
2. There is virtually no limit to the amount of money an institution could spend for seemingly fruitful educational ends;
3. Each institution raises all the money it can;
4. Each institution spends all it raises;

He concludes that, "the cumulative effect of the preceding four laws is toward ever increasing expenditure". In other words, because universities always seek to raise more money, and spend all that they raise, universities inevitably tends towards spending more.

== Empirical evidence ==
Many scholars have argued that universities fit much of Bowen's description: the economist Ronald G. Ehrenberg, in his book Tuition Rising: Why College Costs So Much, describes universities as "cookie monsters" who "seek out all the resources that they can get their hands on and then devour them", for instance, while the former president of Harvard University Derek Bok, in his book Universities in the Marketplace: The Commercialization of Higher Education, compared universities to "compulsive gamblers" for whom "there is never enough money to satisfy their desires".

However, evidence for the revenue theory of costs has been mixed. The economists Robert E. Martin and R. Carter Hill argued in a 2014 study of American universities, for instance, that Bowen's rule does play a major role in rising university costs, accounting for 51% of the cost change in public universities and 43% of the change in private universities during a "loose revenue period" between 1987 and 2005 (before the 2008 financial crisis, when "economic conditions were good and, according to surveys, the public placed an ever higher value on postsecondary education"), and 29% at public universities and 64% at private universities during a "tight revenue period" between 2008 and 2011 (after the financial crisis, when "economic conditions became severe and the public was pressed by the cost of higher education"). Additionally, they determined that Bowen effects are larger than Baumol effects. However, a 2006 study by economists Robert B. Archibald and David H. Feldman found the reverse, contending that Bowen's rule played only a minor role in rising higher education costs while the Baumol effect dominated.
