= Sheila Lieder =

American politician

Member of the Colorado House of Representatives from the 28th district
- Incumbent
- Assumed office January 9, 2023
- Preceded by: Kerry Tipper
- Succeeded by: David Rein (elect)

Personal details
- Party: Democratic

Sheila Lieder is an American politician who has served as a member of the Colorado House of Representatives since January 9, 2023. She represents Colorado's 28th House district. Before her election to the House, she worked on the Joe Biden 2020 presidential campaign.

== Political career ==
She was elected on November 8, 2022, in the 2022 Colorado House of Representatives election. She assumed office on January 9, 2023. She was re-elected in 2024.

During her tenure in the state house, Lieder focused on accessible healthcare, public education and worker rights.

In the 2026 general election, Leider is the Democratic candidate seeking to represent Colorado's 20th Senate district.

== Lawsuits by former aides ==
Two of Leider's former aides initiated lawsuits against her in 2026, accusing her of having them do work on her senate campaign while they were being paid to work as her legislative aides.

Colorado House of Representatives
Preceded by Kerry Tipper	Member of the Colorado House of Representatives for District 28; 2023–present	Succeeded by incumbent
