= Colorado's 28th House of Representatives district =

American legislative district

Colorado's 28th State House of Representatives district
Representative
Sheila Lieder; D–Littleton
- Demographics: 75% White; 1% Black; 16% Hispanic; 4% Asian; 0% Native American; 4% Multiracial
- Population (2024): 84,564

Colorado's 28th House of Representatives district is one of 65 districts in the Colorado House of Representatives. It has been represented by Sheila Lieder since 2023.

== Members ==
- Brittany Pettersen
- Kerry Tipper
- Sheila Lieder
- David Rein
