= Kerry Tipper =

American politician from Colorado

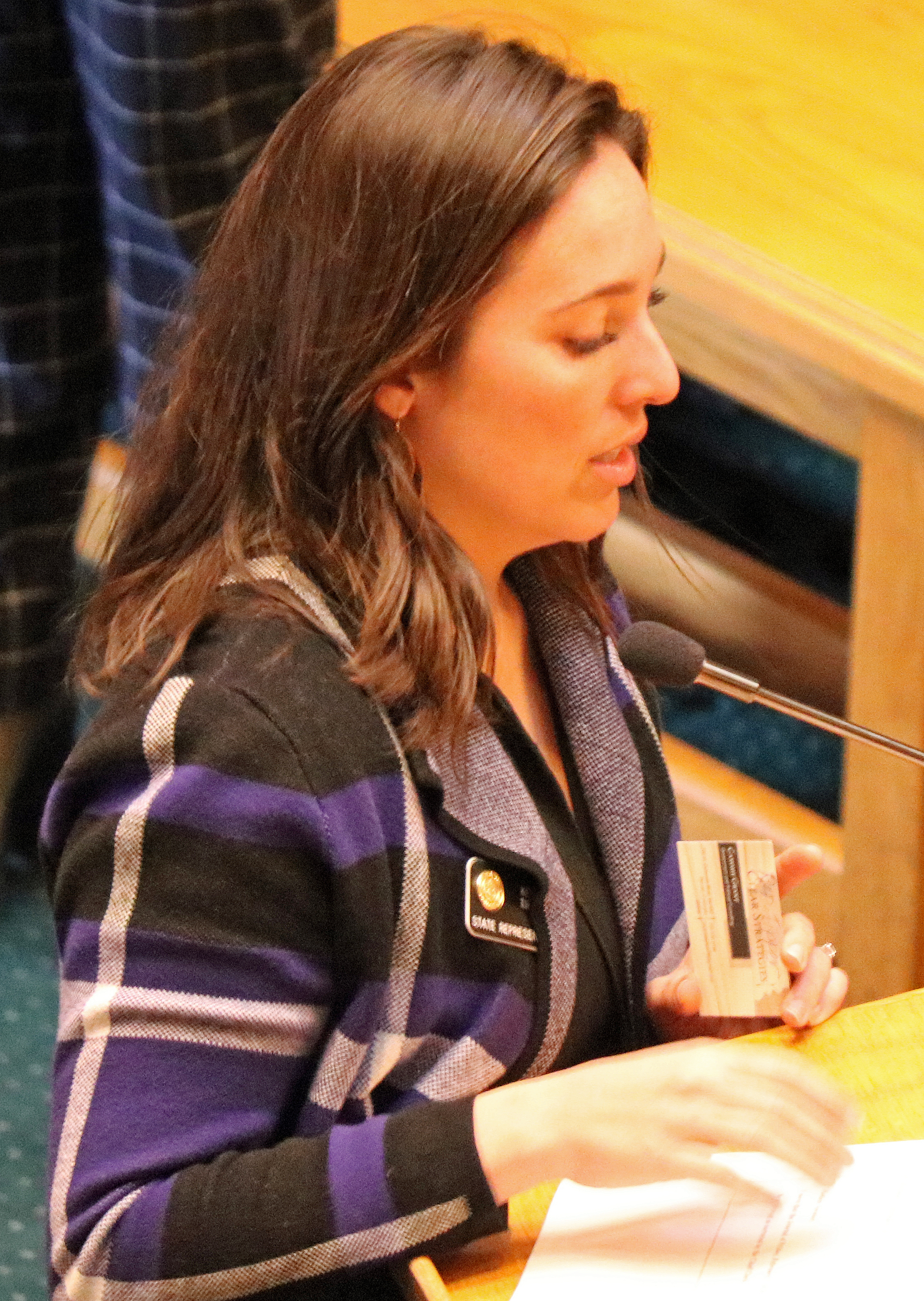
- Tipper in 2020

Member of the Colorado House of Representatives from the 28th district
- In office January 4, 2019 – January 9, 2023
- Preceded by: Brittany Pettersen
- Succeeded by: Sheila Lieder

Personal details
- Born: December 11, 1983 (age 42)
- Party: Democratic
- Relations: Edward Tipper (father)
- Education: University of Denver Northeastern University School of Law
- Occupation: Lawyer

Kerry Christina Tipper (born December 11, 1983) is an American attorney and politician who is a former member of the Colorado House of Representatives from the 28th district in Jefferson County. As Vice President of University Counsel at the University of Colorado, Tipper is the system's chief legal officer.

== Legal career ==
Tipper worked as a Spanish interpreter at an immigration law firm before attending law school. Tipper was an attorney for WilmerHale and Assistant Attorney General in Massachusetts and Colorado.

In May 2022, Denver Mayor Hancock appointed Tipper as Denver Deputy City Attorney. She was appointed Denver City Attorney in November 2022. Mayor Mike Johnston re-appointed her in September 2023. Tipper was the first Latina appointed to the position.

== Political career ==
=== Election ===
Tipper was elected in the general election on November 6, 2018, winning 59 percent of the vote over 38 percent of Republican candidate Kristina Alley. She was elected to her second term on November 3, 2020, winning 58 percent of the vote over 37% of Republican candidate Pete Roybal. In early 2022, Tipper decided not to seek re-election.

== Personal life ==
Tipper is the daughter of Edward Tipper, whose exploits as a World War II paratrooper were depicted in the 2001 HBO miniseries Band of Brothers. Home video and interview footage of a teenaged Tipper are featured in the 2001 companion documentary "We Stand Alone Together". Her mother, Rosy, is from Costa Rica and about 28 years younger than Edward, her father who was 62-years-old when she was born.
