= Abundance (Klein and Thompson book) =

2025 book by Ezra Klein and Derek Thompson

- First edition cover
- Author: Ezra Klein; Derek Thompson
- Genre: Nonfiction
- Publisher: Avid Reader Press, an imprint of Simon & Schuster
- Publication date: March 18, 2025
- Pages: 304 (first edition)
- ISBN: 978-1668023488
- OCLC: 1504483512

Abundance is a nonfiction book by Ezra Klein and Derek Thompson published by Avid Reader Press in March 2025. The book examines the reasons behind the lack of progress on ambitious industrial strategy projects in the United States, including those related to affordable housing, infrastructure, and climate change. It became a New York Times Best Seller.

Taking inspiration from the YIMBY ("Yes in my backyard") movement, Klein and Thompson argue that the regulatory environment in many liberal cities, while well intentioned, has stymied development. They write that liberals have been more concerned with blocking bad economic development than promoting good development since the 1970s, and that Democrats have focused too much on process rather than results, favoring stasis over growth by backing zoning regulations, developing strict environmental protection laws, and tying expensive requirements to public infrastructure spending.

Klein and Thompson propose an "abundance agenda" that they say better manages the tradeoffs between regulations and social advancement, and lament that America is stuck between a progressive movement that is too afraid of economic growth and a conservative movement that is allergic to government intervention. They present the abundance agenda as a way to initiate new economic conditions that will diminish the appeal of the "socialist left" and the "populist-authoritarian right".

The book received mixed reception from critics. Some praised the scope and clarity of the ideas presented, while others viewed the book as ignoring trade-offs and negative impacts.

== Background ==
At the time of the book's publication, Ezra Klein worked as a columnist for The New York Times, while Derek Thompson held a position as staff writer for The Atlantic. The book originated from an essay published by Thompson in The Atlantic in January 2022. In an interview, the two authors talked about their differing perspectives when writing Abundance. Thompson stated that he felt "more comfortable starting with economics or technology", while Klein brought a viewpoint "versed in modern politics and political history".

== Reception ==
Henry Grabar of Slate praised the book for being "unabashed in synthesizing good ideas". He wrote that Klein and Thompson present an essential vision of "a 'liberalism that builds'", which could serve as a proactive solution to stagnation of liberal governance, particularly in blue states; however, Grabar also observed that the authors provide remarkably little criticism of the second Trump administration. Benjamin Wallace-Wells of The New Yorker described Abundance as a "fair-minded book" that "recognizes some of the trade-offs that come with redesigning government for dynamism".

Writing for The New York Times, Samuel Moyn gave a mixed review, writing that, while Klein and Thompson correctly identify neoliberal era ushered in by Ronald Regan (and subsequently embraced by both political parties) as the cause of many socioeconomic problems in America, he also found that the book "occasionally reads like the brief of a few elite finance and tech bros in two or three coastal cities who are mainly upset by clogged transit and red tape", and questions the potential consequences of an abundance-driven agenda, wondering whether it would reinforce a culture of consumption.

Eric Levitz of Vox also provided a mixed review, noting a disconnect between the authors' proposals and the political climate at the time of the book's publication. In Levitz's view, pressing issues like the gutting of the federal government and the subversion of court orders made the authors' focus on specific regulatory concerns, like suburban housing codes, seem comparatively minor. He further criticized the authors' avoidance of clearly addressing the trade-offs between their policy proposals and traditional progressive ideology.

Similarly, Noah Kazis of The Guardian, while praising the book's "clarity, accessibility, and rigour", pointed out that the auhors avoid tackling more challenging issues directly by failing to specify which procedural barriers should be addressed. In a negative review for The Wall Street Journal, Barton Swaim criticized the authors for appearing dismissive of American conservatism. He also argued that Klein and Thompson's ideas seemed disconnected from the realities of everyday life and ordinary people.

In Washington Monthly, Zephyr Teachout was critical of the authors' focus on rolling back zoning restrictions, specifically their support for reforming the National Institutes of Health (NIH) and the National Environmental Policy Act (NEPA), as a means to increase housing supply, arguing that it was unlikely to have an impact. She said the authors were unclear regarding the specifics of such reforms, as well as centering their arguments primarily on only a few large American cities, while underestimating the negative effects of monopolization in the U.S. economy at large. She raised concerns that it could be used in the style of deregulation associated with Ronald Reagan. In The New Republic, Julian E. Zelizer argued the book centered on two themes: policy and politics. On the policy side, Zelizer believed that Klein and Thompson presented a convincing case that removing ineffective governmental practices should be a priority to renew liberalism. However, Zelizer was not convinced on the political side, and questioned if there is a political constituency and suggested that institutional reform is only part of the solution.

== Promotion and advocacy ==
The funding coalition and ecosystem promoting "abundance" as a movement predates the book by over a decade. Coefficient Giving (formerly known as Open Philanthropy), an organization affiliated with the effective altruism community, has promoted and funded workshops, conferences, and materials related to the themes of the book since 2015.

The Abundance Conference began in 2024, sponsored by Coefficient Giving, Arnold Ventures, the Pacific Legal Foundation, and Stand Together (the Koch network's philanthropic foundation). Collectively, these organizations have spent over $120M promoting the themes and ideas of the book via conferences, think tanks, and grants.

In June 2025, California governor Gavin Newsom referenced the book and its thesis when he signed two bills that he had pushed through the legislative process to roll back California's landmark environmental law, the California Environmental Quality Act, in order to reduce bureaucratic obstacles to the creation of new housing.

Klein delivered the keynote address at the Abundance Conference in 2025, where his co-author Thompson moderated a panel on clean energy infrastructure. Klein also addressed the Urban Institute's 2025 Housing Policy Conference on themes from the book. Regional gatherings have also occurred, including a California Abundance Forum in San Francisco, which focused on housing affordability and transit development.

An "Abundance Elected Network" was launched in September 2025, with initial involvement from 120 lawmakers. Some conferences and workshops in the movement are organized by a group called the "Abundance Network", which was founded by Misha Chellam and Zack Rosen.

== See also ==
=== Related movements ===
- Progress studies – Intellectual movement focused on understanding and accelerating civilizational progress
- Deregulation – Process of removing or reducing state regulations
- Georgism – Economic philosophy centered on common ownership of land
- Mixed-use development – Type of urban development strategy
- New Urbanism – Urban design movement promoting sustainable land use
- Regulatory reform
- Supply-side progressivism – Political ideology
- Smart growth – Urban planning philosophy
- Transit-oriented development – Urban planning prioritising transit

=== Publications ===
- Breakneck: China's Quest to Engineer the Future

=== Other ===
- Seattle process – Political process
- Missing middle housing – Lack of medium density housing in North America
- Urban economics – Economic study of urban areas
- Urban planning – Technical process of land use and urban design
- Real estate economics – Application of economic techniques to real estate markets
- Abundant Housing LA – US nonprofit housing affordability organization
- Build America Caucus – US congressional caucus
