= Congressional YIMBY Caucus =

US congressional caucus

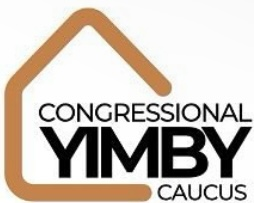
- Co-Chairs: 8: Jake Auchincloss; Juan Ciscomani; Chuck Edwards; Robert Garcia; Blake Moore; Scott Peters; Brittany Pettersen; Ryan Zinke
- Founded: November 21, 2024; 22 months ago
- Ideology: YIMBY-ism; Deregulation
- Seats in House Democratic Caucus: 28 / 213
- Seats in House Republican Caucus: 5 / 218
- Seats in the House: 33 / 431

The Congressional Yes In My Back Yard (YIMBY) Caucus is a bipartisan US congressional caucus founded in November 2024. The members of the Congressional YIMBY Caucus support increasing the housing supply through tax incentives and deregulation.

== History ==
The Congressional YIMBY Caucus was founded in the aftermath of the 2024 United States presidential election, amid growing national concern over housing affordability. A Pew Research Center survey conducted during the campaign found that 69% of US adults were "very concerned" about the cost of housing, an increase from 60% in 2022.

The caucus officially launched on November 21, 2024 at an event attended by the founding co-chairs as well as leaders of several outside organizations. These included non-profits focused on affordable housing, public transportation, climate resilience, and social equity, as well as trade groups representing landlords, tenants, and mortgage bankers.

== Members ==
Congressional YIMBY Caucus in the 119th Congress: Democratic Congressional YIMBY Caucus member Republican Congressional YIMBY Caucus member

As of March 20, 2025, the Congressional YIMBY Caucus has 33 members, all in the House of Representatives. These members are majority Democratic, though the co-chairs split evenly between Democrats and Republicans.

=== Current co-chairs ===
Member Name (Party)	Hometown	District	Assumed office
Jake Auchincloss (D)	Newton, MA	MA-4	January 3, 2021
Juan Ciscomani (R)	Tucson, AZ	AZ-6	January 3, 2023
Chuck Edwards (R)	Flat Rock, NC	NC-11	January 3, 2023
Robert Garcia (D)	Long Beach, CA	CA-42	January 3, 2023
Blake Moore (R)	Salt Lake City, UT	UT-1	January 3, 2021
Scott Peters (D)	San Diego, CA	CA-52	January 3, 2013
Brittany Pettersen (D)	Lakewood, CO	CO-7	January 3, 2023
Ryan Zinke (R)	Whitefish, MT	MT-1	January 3, 2023

=== Current members ===
Member Name (Party)	Hometown	District	Assumed office
Yassamin Ansari (D)	Phoenix, AZ	AZ-3	January 3, 2025
Don Beyer (D)	Alexandria, VA	VA-8	January 3, 2015
Chris Deluzio (D)	Aspinwall, PA	PA-17	January 3, 2023
Debbie Dingell (D)	Ann Arbor, MI	MI-6	January 3, 2015
Brian Fitzpatrick (R)	Levittown, PA	PA-1	January 3, 2017
Laura Friedman (D)	Glendale, CA	CA-30	January 3, 2025
Maxwell Frost (D)	Orlando, FL	FL-10	January 3, 2023
Josh Harder (D)	Tracy, CA	CA-9	January 3, 2019
Sara Jacobs (D)	San Diego, CA	CA-51	January 3, 2021
Ro Khanna (D)	Fremont, CA	CA-17	January 3, 2017
Greg Landsman (D)	Cincinnati, OH	OH-1	January 3, 2023
Morgan McGarvey (D)	Louisville, KY	KY-3	January 3, 2023
LaMonica McIver (D)	Newark, NJ	NJ-10	September 23, 2024
Robert Menendez (D)	Jersey City, NJ	NJ-8	January 3, 2023
Joseph Morelle (D)	Irondequoit, NY	NY-25	November 13, 2018
Seth Moulton (D)	Salem, MA	MA-6	January 3, 2015
Kevin Mullin (D)	South San Francisco, CA	CA-15	January 3, 2023
Jerry Nadler (D)	New York, NY	NY-12	November 3, 1992
Chellie Pingree (D)	North Haven, ME	ME-1	January 3, 2009
Andrea Salinas (D)	Tigard, OR	OR-6	January 3, 2023
Hillary Scholten (D)	Grand Rapids, MI	MI-3	January 3, 2023
Greg Stanton (D)	Phoenix, AZ	AZ-4	January 3, 2019
Mark Takano (D)	Riverside, CA	CA-39	January 3, 2013
Shri Thanedar (D)	Detroit, MI	MI-13	January 3, 2023
Gabe Vasquez (D)	Las Cruces, NM	NM-2	January 3, 2023

=== Former members ===
Member Name (Party)	State	Left office	Ref
Lori Chavez-DeRemer (R)	Oregon	January 3, 2025	
Derek Kilmer (D)	Washington	January 3, 2025	
Marc Molinaro (R)	New York	January 3, 2025	
Wiley Nickel (D)	North Carolina	January 3, 2025	

== Legislation ==
Although the Congressional YIMBY Caucus has yet to introduce or endorse its own legislation, several of its members have introduced bills to address housing shortages and increase the housing supply.

=== Proposed (but not enacted) in the 119th Congress ===
- January 9, 2025: Low Income Housing for Defense Communities Act of 2025 (Sponsored by Blake Moore), H.R. 308
- February 6, 2025: CONSTRUCTS Act of 2025 (Sponsored by Juan Ciscomani), H.R. 1055
- April 8, 2025: People Over Parking Act of 2025 (Sponsored by Robert Garcia), H.R. 2710
- July 21, 2025: Build More Housing Near Transit Act of 2025 (Sponsored by Scott Peters), H.R. 4576

=== Proposed (but not enacted) in the 118th Congress ===
- May 9, 2023: People Over Parking Act (Sponsored by Robert Garcia), H.R. 3145
- May 18, 2023: Yes in My Backyard Act (Sponsored by Derek Kilmer), H.R. 3507
- November 23, 2023: Build More Housing Near Transit Act (Sponsored by Scott Peters), H.R. 6199
- July 30, 2024: SUPER Demonstration Act (Sponsored by Juan Ciscomani), H.R. 9195
- September 18, 2024: Low Income Housing for Defense Communities Act (Sponsored by Blake Moore), H.R. 9659
- December 16, 2024: CONSTRUCTS Act of 2024 (Sponsored by Juan Ciscomani), H.R. 10420

== See also ==
- Climate Solutions Caucus
- Problem Solvers Caucus
- Build America Caucus
