= Progress studies =

Intellectual movement

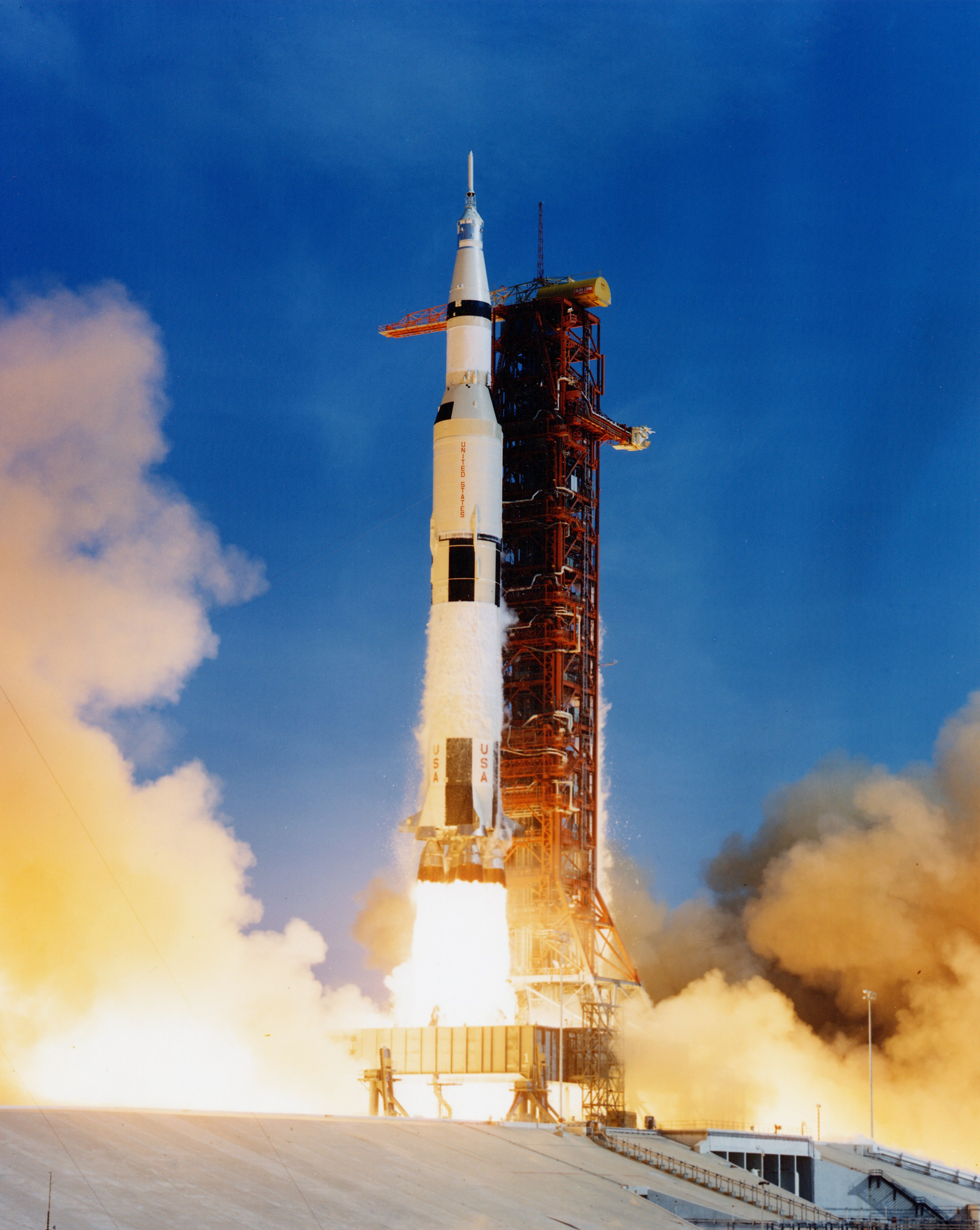
Apollo 11 Saturn V lifting off on July 16, 1969. Economist Tyler Cowen believes that the period of American growth prior to the 1970s (including government prioritization of space exploration) was due to exploiting "low-hanging fruit" in terms of technology and labor.

Progress studies is an intellectual movement focused on "figuring out why progress happens and how to make it happen faster." The term "progress studies" was coined in a 2019 article for The Atlantic, entitled "We Need a New Science of Progress" by Tyler Cowen and Patrick Collison.

The movement examines progress in standards of living through the lens of science, technology, economics, history, philosophy and culture. It includes work on the definition and measurement of progress, as well as policies and programs aimed at improving the rate of technological innovation.

== History ==
Following publication of the key article, Cowen and Collison were hosted by Mark Zuckerberg for a podcast. Around the same time, Jason Crawford committed full-time to his popular blog "The Roots of Progress", calling for "a clearer understanding of the nature of progress, its causes, its value and importance, how we can manage its costs and risks, and ultimately how we can accelerate progress while ensuring that it is beneficial to humanity." Roots of Progress has since grown into a research institute, awarding grants to fellows. Elsewhere, the online magazine Works in Progress was established by Sam Bowman, Saloni Dattani, Ben Southwood and Nick Whitaker in 2020, "dedicated to sharing new and underrated ideas to improve the world". The publication was later purchased by Stripe Press in 2022. Alec Stapp and Caleb Watney founded the Institute for Progress think tank in 2021, a "non-partisan research and advocacy organization dedicated to accelerating scientific, technological, and industrial progress while safeguarding humanity's future."

The emerging field has influenced broader political discourse, notably in the United States of America. In response to Cowen and Collison's article, New York Times columnist Ezra Klein wrote: "The questions animating progress studies aren't mere academic exercises; they are central to understanding how we can bring about a better future for all." In a subsequent article about supply-side progressivism, Klein wrote that progressive politics "requires a movement that takes innovation as seriously as it takes affordability."

== Ideas ==
Jason Crawford, founder of the Roots of Progress Institute, has said that "Progress is anything that helps human beings live better lives: longer, happier, healthier, in mind, body, and spirit." Humans have experienced unprecedented progress over the last century as measured by the proportion of people living in extreme poverty, life expectancy, education, and the amount of leisure time people have. However, according to Our World in Data, over 90% of people think the world is getting worse or staying the same. Progress studies advocates believe that the world has gotten better, while also believing that there is a lot of room for improvement, and that humanity should continue to strive for an even better future.

=== Growth ===
A coarse but commonly used indicator of progress and economic growth is gross domestic product. In "Stubborn Attachments", Tyler Cowen wrote:

[...] growth alleviates misery, improves happiness and opportunity, and lengthens lives. Wealthier societies have better living standards, better medicines, and offer greater personal autonomy, greater fulfillment, and more sources of fun.

Critics of progress studies say that the movement focuses too much on total growth and not enough on inequality. However supply-side progressives in particular do aim to distribute wealth more fairly, for example through housing policy reform efforts to reduce rents paid to landlords and allow more people to move to cities with higher paying opportunities.

=== The Great Stagnation ===
In the last hundred-and-fifty to two-hundred years, unprecedented improvements have taken place in life expectancy, literacy, child mortality, and poverty, especially during an exceptional period of economic growth from 1870 to 1970. As Paul Krugman said in 1996, "By any reasonable standard, the change in how America lived between 1918 and 1957 was immensely greater than the change between 1957 and the present."

The great stagnation refers to the time from the 1970s to the present, where people's paychecks relative to cost of living started decreasing, and breakthrough scientific papers and patents have become less common. Tyler Cowen posits in his book, The Great Stagnation, that recent advances in information technology, have obscured a slowdown in scientific discovery and technological innovation outside of computers. Initiatives such as the Institute for Progress's partnership with the National Science Foundation aim to better align research granting incentives with scientific progress.

== Applications ==
=== Metascience ===
Improving processes and outcomes of scientific research is one area of focus within progress studies. While the number of research dollars, scientists, papers, and patents have been increasing over the years, the degree of innovation has been decreasing by some measures of patent quality and recent Nobel prizes. Factors such as a decline in the availability of open-access scientific publications and peer review turnaround for papers, may be contributing to the decline. Other researchers report that peer review scoring is not an accurate way of predicting which grants will be the most productive.

Science writer and researcher (and Works in Progress co-founder) Saloni Dattani advocates for governments and international organizations to foster more widespread collection of public health data across different countries, the testing of more interventions in parallel during randomized controlled trials, recruiting industry experts to contribute to scientific endeavors, reforming the peer review process, and greater data transparency from scientists Economists Heidi Williams and Paul Niehaus have argued that scientific practice could be improved with institutional support to amplify top-performers' work, and with incubation grants allowing institutions to "partner with academic researchers in trying to integrate research into operationalizing and scaling effective interventions."

In response to the replication crisis, Spencer Greenberg and his team at Clearer Thinking have been replicating psychology studies published in prestigious journals since 2022.

=== Energy and the environment ===
Proponents of progress studies tend to be supportive of building energy infrastructure, particularly for renewables like nuclear, wind, and solar, believing that energy abundance encourages economic growth and human progress. This is in contrast to the idea of degrowth, from more traditional environmental movements where people decrease consumption to protect the environment.

Stagnation has been partly attributed to lack of energy by J. Storrs Hall, who notes that energy consumption flatlined in the early 1970s, before the OPEC crisis. Matthew Yglesias wrote in 2021 that this "energy diet" was holding back innovation and that "we want to generate vastly more energy than we are currently using and make it zero carbon." Economist Ryan Avent explains: "The difference between the sci-fi futures people imagined a half-century ago and the present as we live it — similar to the past, but we all have pocket computers — is an energy gap."

In contrast with traditional environmentalists, progress studies advocates tend to promote using science and technology to change the climate and the environment for the better, for example through advances in the field of terraformation. Progress studies proponents take note of efforts from environmental groups to obstruct building infrastructure for green energy.

=== Housing ===
Proponents of progress studies tend to be aligned with YIMBY policies, believing that a shortage of housing in major cities limits economic growth. In Britain, former hedge fund manager and British YIMBY leader John Myers, along with policy analysts Ben Southwood and Sam Bowman, have suggested a "Housing Theory of Everything", which states that a wide range of problems – "slow growth, climate change, poor health, financial instability, economic inequality, and falling fertility" – could be improved by fixing the housing shortage. Ezra Klein has also written about YIMBY as a part of supply-side progressivism.

== Criticism ==
A characteristic feature and a central impetus of progress studies and associated areas of metascience has been the claim that disruptive scientific research and patents have been in a decades-long secular decline. The evidence used for these claims has centred upon the increase in scientific funding and the number of scientists over time, contrasted with the apparent decrease in the disruptiveness of the scientific research and patents produced. However, studies have raised doubts about the reliability and validity of the metrics commonly used to provide measures of disruptiveness, arguing that correcting for methodological choices — such as accounting for changes to patent law or truncating citation data differently — can make the apparent decline in disruptiveness disappear, or even reverse. Also, there is only partial convergence between the inference of the measures of disruptiveness with that of evaluations from experts within the relevant fields. With regards to the use of citation data, many disruption metrics use a limited post-publication window, which may not capture the long-term impact of genuinely disruptive work. Also, the disruption indices are sensitive to the completeness of citation databases, which can vary by discipline, language, and time period. Furthermore, incomplete data can distort results and make cross-field comparisons unreliable, and citation behaviour can change over time, influenced as much by social and cultural factors within a given academic domain as that of the scientific impact itself.

== See also ==
- Supply-side progressivism – Political ideology
- Transhumanism – Philosophical movement
- Charter city – Planned community
- Ecomodernism – Environmental movement emphasizing technological innovation for sustainability
- Effective accelerationism – Philosophical and social movement
- Frontier Thesis – Argument by historian Frederick Jackson Turner
- Future Shock – 1970 book by Alvin Toffler
- Future Studies – Study of postulating possible futures
- High modernism – Science and tech-oriented modernism
- Techno-progressivism – Stance of active support for the convergence of technological and social change
