= Edward Tipper =

United States Army soldier

Edward Joseph Tipper Jr.
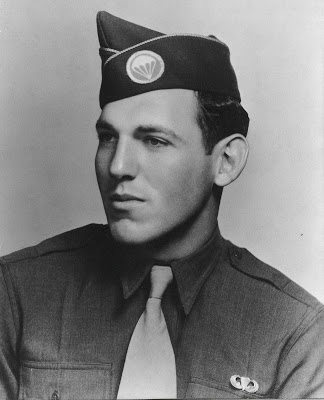
- Born: 3 August 1921; Detroit, Michigan, U.S.
- Died: 1 February 2017 (aged 95); Lakewood, Colorado, U.S.
- Relatives: Kerry Tipper (daughter)
- Military career
- Allegiance: United States
- Branch: United States Army
- Service years: 1942–1945
- Rank: Private First Class
- Units: Easy Company, 2nd Battalion, 506th Parachute Infantry Regiment, 101st Airborne Division
- Conflicts: World War II: Operation Overlord

Edward Joseph Tipper Jr. (3 August 1921 – 1 February 2017) was a paratrooper in Easy Company, 2nd Battalion, 506th Parachute Infantry Regiment in the 101st Airborne Division, United States Army during World War II. Tipper was one of the 140 original Toccoa men of Easy Company. Tipper was portrayed in the HBO miniseries Band of Brothers by Bart Ruspoli. Information about Tipper was featured in the 2009 book We Who Are Alive and Remain.

== Early life ==
Tipper was born in Detroit, Michigan on 3 August 1921 to Lucy (McCormick) and Edward J. Tipper. The younger Tipper’s parents were both immigrants from Ireland, and the family moved back to Ireland when he was three years old, but returned to the United States later. Tipper graduated from a Detroit school in 1939 and worked at a department store.

== Military service ==
After the attack on Pearl Harbor, Tipper tried to enlist in the United States Marine Corps, but was rejected because of an overbite. He therefore enlisted in the United States Army, volunteering for the paratroopers. He was sent to Camp Toccoa, Georgia, and was assigned to Easy Company for training under Captain Herbert Sobel. During training at Camp Mackall, North Carolina, Tipper was made Sobel's runner; with his help, "Sobel was able to mislay his maps, compass, and other items when he most needed them." Tipper received further training with Easy Company in Aldbourne, United Kingdom.

Tipper made his first combat jump into Normandy on D-Day, where he met with fellow Easy Company member Frank Mellet and some other paratroopers and engaged in a firefight with a German patrol. Later, the men and other paratroopers attacked the Marmion Farm. The soldiers held the farm before joining their own units.

Tipper fought in Carentan: after clearing a house, a mortar shell exploded near him when he was standing in the doorway. His right eye was destroyed and his legs were broken. Two other members of E Company dragged Tipper to a nearby aid station. Tipper was sent to a hospital in England, where his right eye was removed. He was then sent back to the United States.

== Later life ==
Tipper was discharged in August 1945 after one year in army hospitals. At first Tipper needed to walk with a cane and wore an eyepatch. Tipper remembered how everybody wanted to do something to show support for the returning war veterans. For instance, someone would pay his bill for him at a restaurant or there would be no bill at all.

Tipper attended the University of Michigan and completed his master's degree in English at the University of Northern Colorado, and became a teacher. In 1961 he won the John Hay Fellowship from the University of California at Berkeley. When Tipper was sixty one, he met Rosy (who was then thirty four) and they were married on 12 February 1983. Their daughter Kerry Christina Tipper was born ten months later.

Tipper died on 1 February 2017 at the age of 95.

== Bibliography ==
- Ambrose, Stephen E. (1992). Band of Brothers: Easy Company, 506th Regiment, 101st Airborne from Normandy to Hitler's Eagle's Nest. Simon & Schuster. ISBN 978-0-7434-6411-6.
