= Niskanen Center =

American moderate think tank founded in 2015

- Formation: 2015; 11 years ago
- Headquarters: Washington, D.C., U.S.
- President: Richard ("R.J.") Lyman
- Revenue: $7,075,571 (2022)
- Expenses: $7,598,252 (2022)
- Website: NiskanenCenter.org

The Niskanen Center is an American think tank based in Washington, D.C. that advocates free-market-oriented principles regarding environmentalism, immigration reform, civil liberties, and an effective welfare state. Named after William A. Niskanen, an economic adviser to Ronald Reagan and former chairman of the Cato Institute, it states that its "main audience is Washington insiders", and characterizes itself as moderate, with others calling it centrist. The organization has been credited with fostering bipartisan dialogue and seeks to promote pragmatic solutions to issues such as family benefits, climate change, and criminal justice reform. Although the Niskanen Center has publicly moved away from the label of Libertarian, rejecting the concept of "ideology", it was initially founded as a "left-libertarian" think tank. It has been variously described as "libertarian", "libertarian leaning", "quasi-libertarian center-right", and "centrist". They have supported proposals such as universal health coverage and increasing state capacity.

== History ==
The Niskanen Center was co-founded in early 2015 by Jerry Taylor and Joe Coon. At its launch, the center was composed primarily of former staffers of the Cato Institute who departed in the wake of a 2012 leadership struggle pitting Ed Crane against the Koch Brothers for control of the libertarian think tank. Taylor and vice president Joe Coon publicly aligned themselves with Crane during the dispute. Both departed shortly after Crane was replaced by John Allison as Cato's president as part of the settlement with the Kochs.

Funding for the center includes donors who seek to counter libertarian-conservative hostility to measures against global warming. North Carolina businessman Jay Faison, a Republican donor, made an early contribution to the Niskanen Center to spur public climate education but has ceased all ties to the organization in recent years. Other donors include the Open Philanthropy Project, which supported the center's work to expand legal immigration, the Lawrence Linden Trust for Conservation, which provided the Niskanen Center with a grant "to develop and analyze a potential economy-wide carbon tax", and the Hewlett Foundation, which provided the Center with a $400,000 operations grant.

In 2018, the Center published its political manifesto, entitled "The Center Can Hold: Public Policy for an Age of Extremes".

In May 2022, the organization announced that Ted Gayer, an executive vice president at the Brookings Institution, would serve as the Niskanen's next president. Gayer started in his role on August 1, 2022 and stepped down in February, 2026 amid a wave of senior staff resignations.

== Policy areas ==
The Niskanen Center's policy approach combines free market principles with support for an "effective" welfare state. The organization focuses on a number of distinct areas of public policy including climate change, social insurance policy, healthcare, immigration reform, and civil liberties. Brink Lindsey described the Center as representing "bold moderation".

=== Climate change ===
The Niskanen Center advocates the imposition of a global carbon tax for the purpose of offsetting global warming and the effects of climate change. The Center also endorses the understanding of climate change as anthropogenic and believes that government action is a necessary component of mitigating the risks associated with long term sea level rise and extreme weather events associated with climate change.

The Niskanen Center's support for carbon taxation represents a nearly complete reversal of Taylor's previous advocacy at the Cato Institute, where he was a vocal climate change skeptic. Taylor explained his shift in a 2015 interview with Vox, indicating that he had "fundamentally switched" his previous beliefs on the issue after seeing new scientific evidence and the more general strengthening over time of the case for the dangers of climate change, as well as arguments from fellow libertarians about responses to the challenge of climate change that were consistent with, and even required by, a libertarian political stance.

In November 2015 the Niskanen Center announced the founding of a new Center for Climate Science under the direction of Dr. Joseph Majkut, a climatologist who previously served on the staff of Sen. Sheldon Whitehouse (D-RI).

=== Immigration ===
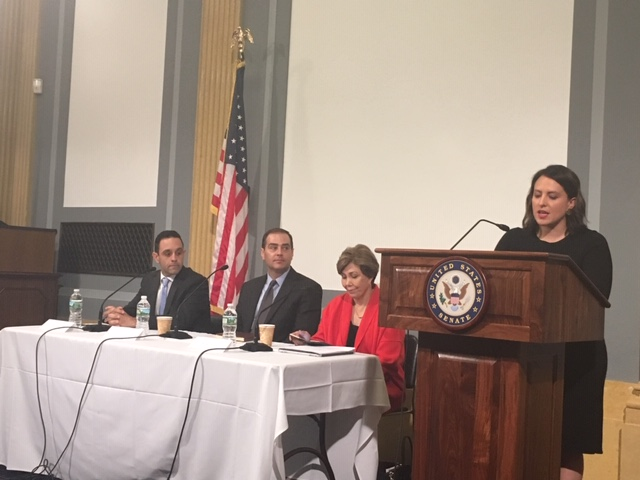
Niskanen Center's Kristie De Peña moderates a panel discussing the benefits of expanding the U.S. refugee resettlement program on September 20, 2018.

The Niskanen Center is pro-immigration. Niskanen has hosted two Hill events focusing on the practical benefits of refugee resettlement to the U.S.

=== Abundance ===
The Niskanen Center supports supply-side progressivism, also commonly referred to as the "Abundance Agenda", proposed as an alternative to the emerging right-wing populism within the Republican Party and the growing popularity of Democratic Socialism in the Democratic Party. According to Kate Willett of The New International, "Niskanen envisions a new right-liberal alliance centered around 'abundance' and opposing the left, arguing that by working within a political party, new model supply-siders can advance their cause and break free from traditional left-right polarization." She describes Abundance as a "press release for a collection of think tanks who are fighting to win 'a battle for the future of the Democratic Party'–a future that Tech Right billionaires can get behind."

=== Factionalism ===
The Niskanen Center advocates a strategy of factionalism to achieve policy objectives within the existing party system, specifically to cultivate and support a market-liberal faction within the Democratic Party and a liberal-conservative (Rockefeller Republican) faction within the Republican party to allow moderates to "re-emerg[e] as a power center in American politics".

== Reception ==
Writing for the socialist magazine, Jacobin, Lyle Jeremy Rubin describes the Niskanen Center as publishing "rigorous center-right libertarian opinion", while John Quiggin described the it as "the so-called liberaltarian Niskanen Center".

Conservative columnist Jennifer Rubin, writing for the Washington Post in 2019, described it as the "future of the right" and "eschew[ing] both anti-government libertarianism [...] and democratic socialism".

Jonathan Chait, in a 2018 New York magazine column entitled "I Have Seen the Future of a Republican Party That Is No Longer Insane", described the Center as "libertarian-leaning", writing that "Niskanen's manifesto contains multiple points of overlap with the prevailing orientation of the Democratic Party, and almost none with the prevailing orientation of the Republican Party".

== See also ==
- Cost disease socialism
- Eco-capitalism
- Green libertarianism
- Libertarian paternalism
- Mixed economy
- Neoclassical liberalism
- Third Way
- Welfare capitalism
