= Brink Lindsey =

American political scientist

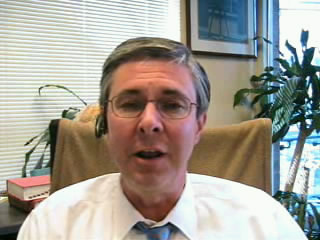
- Education: Princeton University (BA); Harvard University (JD)

Brink Lindsey is an American political writer, and Vice President and Director of the Open Society Project at the Niskanen Center. Previously he was the Cato Institute's vice president for research. From 1998 to 2004, he was director of Cato's Center for Trade Policy Studies, focusing on free trade, and also editor of Cato Unbound, a monthly web magazine. He was a senior fellow with the Kauffman Foundation from 2010 to 2012. An attorney with a background in international trade regulation, Lindsey was formerly director of regulatory studies at Cato and senior editor of Regulation magazine.

He is a contributing editor at Reason magazine and a frequent discussion guest on BloggingHeads.tv and often moderates Cato panel discussions. He was a registered Republican and self-proclaimed libertarian and endorsed Sen. Barack Obama during the 2008 presidential campaign. More recently, he's described himself as a "recovering libertarian" and a "brokeness liberal." He has written on a broad range of topics including trade, economic growth, cultural division, economic inequality, the nature of IQ scores, and helicopter parents.

== Education ==
Lindsey holds an A.B. from Princeton University and a J.D. from Harvard Law School.

== Notable research ==
=== Human Capitalism ===
In August 2012, Lindsey authored the first original eBook ever published by Princeton University Press, an electronic release of Human Capitalism: How Economic Growth has Made Us Smarter–and More Unequal. The release of the eBook ahead of the expanded hardcover eventually published the following year was speculated to have occurred so that the book might reach its audience before the 2012 U.S. presidential election. The book focuses on human capital, and its relationship to both economic growth and social divisions. Lindsey has summarized the book's concept of human capital by saying, "When I say we’re getting smarter, what I really mean is we are becoming more fluent in highly abstract ways of thinking. Abstraction is the master strategy for coping with complexity: broad categories and general rules are the mental shortcuts we use to keep information overload at bay."

=== The Age of Abundance ===
In this book Lindsey wrote on the nature of American prosperity in the latter half of the twentieth century, and the effects of affluence on American culture. In an interview about the book on The Daily Show, Lindsey described its examination of how, in his view, the U.S.'s Post-World War II economic expansion "triggered the cultural convulsion of the sixties and seventies," going on to claim that environmentalism, feminism, and many other facets of cultural change could not have occurred without economic prosperity in place. Lindsey considers these changes in American culture in the context of modern left-right politics, arguing that "On the left gathered those who were most alive to the new possibilities created by mass affluence but who, at the same time, were hostile to the social institutions responsible for creating those possibilities. On the right, meanwhile, rallied those who staunchly supported the institutions that created prosperity but who shrank from the social dynamism they were unleashing."

== Publications ==
- The Permanent Problem: The Uncertain Transition from Mass Plenty to Mass Flourishing. (2026) ISBN 978-0-19-780396-7
- The Captured Economy: How the Powerful Become Richer, Slow Down Growth, and Increase Inequality. (2019) ISBN 978-0-19-062776-8 (with Steven M. Teles).
- Human Capitalism: How Economic Growth Has Made Us Smarter – and More Unequal. (2013) ISBN 978-0-691-15732-0.
- The Age of Abundance: How Prosperity Transformed America's Politics and Culture. (2007) ISBN 978-0-06-074766-4
- Antidumping Exposed: The Devilish Details of Unfair Trade Law. (2003) ISBN 978-1-930865-48-8. (with Daniel J. Ikenson).
- Against the Dead Hand: The Uncertain Struggle for Global Capitalism. (2002) ISBN 978-0-471-44277-6
