= Baumol effect =

Rise of salaries in jobs that have seen little rise of productivity

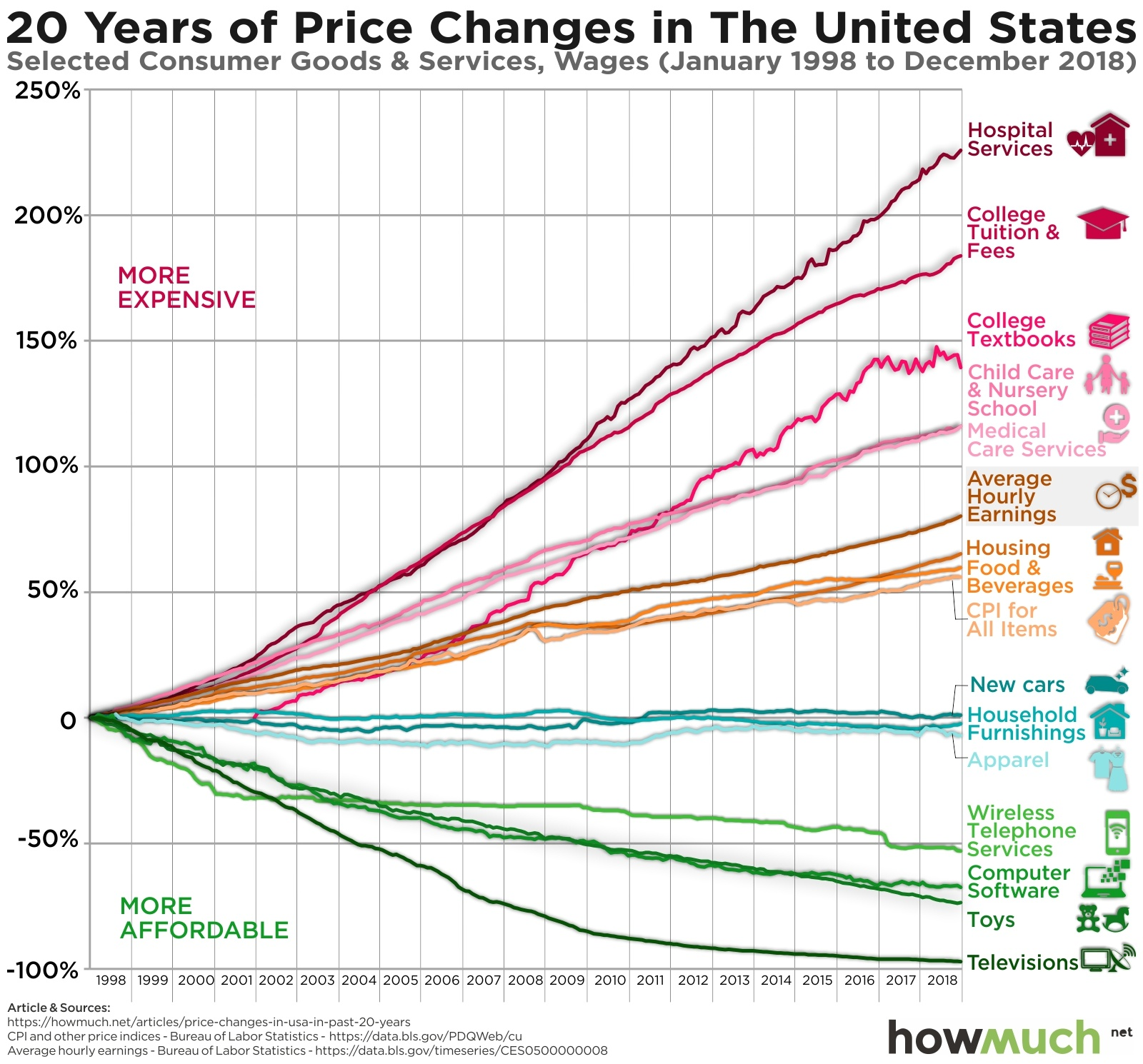
As the Baumol effect predicts, between 1998 and 2018, services became more expensive while many manufactured goods became cheaper. Note the modest increase in average wages in the middle.

In economics, the Baumol effect, or Baumol's cost disease, first described by William J. Baumol and William G. Bowen in the 1960s, is the tendency for wages in jobs that have experienced little or no increase in labor productivity to rise in response to rising wages in other jobs that did experience high productivity growth. In turn, these sectors of the economy become more expensive over time, because the input costs increase while productivity does not. Typically, this affects services more than manufactured goods, and in particular health, education, arts and culture.

This effect is an example of cross elasticity of demand. The rise of wages in jobs without productivity gains results from the need to compete for workers with jobs that have experienced productivity gains and so can naturally pay higher wages. For instance, if the retail sector pays its managers low wages, those managers may decide to quit and get jobs in the automobile sector, where wages are higher because of higher labor productivity. Thus, retail manager salaries increase not due to labor productivity increases in the retail sector, but due to productivity and corresponding wage increases in other industries.

The Baumol effect explains a number of important economic developments:

- The share of total employment in sectors with high productivity growth decreases, while that of low productivity sectors increases.
- Economic growth slows down due to the smaller proportion of high-growth sectors in the whole economy.
- Government spending is disproportionately affected by the Baumol effect, because of its focus on services like health, education and law enforcement.
- Increasing costs in labor-intensive service industries, or below-average cost decreases, are not necessarily a result of inefficiency.
- Due to income inequality, services whose prices rise faster than incomes can become unaffordable to many workers. This happens despite overall economic growth, and has been exacerbated by the rise in inequality in recent decades.

Baumol referred to the difference in productivity growth between economic sectors as unbalanced growth. Sectors can be differentiated by productivity growth as progressive or non-progressive. The resulting transition to a post-industrial society, i.e., an economy where most workers are employed in the tertiary sector, is called tertiarization.

== Description ==
Increases in labor productivity tend to result in higher wages. Productivity growth is not uniform across the economy, however. Some sectors experience high productivity growth, while others experience little or negative productivity growth. Yet wages have tended to rise not only in sectors with high productivity growth, but also in those with little to no productivity growth.

The American economists William J. Baumol and William G. Bowen proposed that wages in sectors with stagnant productivity rise out of the need to compete for workers with sectors that experience higher productivity growth, sectors that can afford to raise wages without raising prices. With higher labor costs, but little increase in productivity, sectors with low productivity growth see their costs of production rise. As summarized by Baumol in a 1967 paper:

If productivity per man hour rises cumulatively in one sector relative to its rate of growth elsewhere in the economy, while wages rise commensurately in all areas, then relative costs in the nonprogressive sectors must inevitably rise, and these costs will rise cumulatively and without limit...Thus, the very progress of the technologically progressive sectors inevitably adds to the costs of the technologically unchanging sectors of the economy, unless somehow the labor markets in these areas can be sealed off and wages held absolutely constant, a most unlikely possibility.

== Origins ==
=== Jean Fourastié: unbalanced growth in economic sectors ===
Studying various price series over time, Jean Fourastié noticed the unequal technological progress in different industries.

But what is essential is that very large sectors of economic activity have remained practically unaffected by technological progress. For example, the men's barber does not cut more clients' hair in 1948 than in 1900; entire professions have not changed their working methods from 1900 to 1930. ... (1949: 27).

He predicted that this would lead to a gradual increase in the share of services in the economy, and the resulting post-industrial society:

... the absolute volume of secondary production continues to grow; but from a certain state of economic development, the value of these growing productions diminishes in relation to the total volume of national production. Thus, tertiary values invade economic life; that is why it can be said that the civilization of technical progress will be a tertiary civilization. (1949: 59)

In a 2003 article, Baumol noted: "For the origins of the analysis, see Fourastié (1963)."

=== Baumol and Bowen: rising wages despite productivity stagnation ===
The original study on the Baumol effect was conducted for the performing arts sector. American economists Baumol and Bowen in 1965 said, "the output per man-hour of the violinist playing a Schubert quartet in a standard concert hall is relatively fixed." In other words, they said the productivity of classical music performance had not increased. However, the real wages of musicians had increased substantially since the 19th century. Gambling and Andrews pointed out in 1984 that productivity does go up with the size of the performance halls. Furthermore, Greenfield pointed out in 1995 that far more people hear the performance due to advances in amplification, recording and broadcasting, so productivity has increased many-fold.

== Effects ==
=== Price and output ===
Firms may respond to increases in labor costs induced by the Baumol effect in a variety of ways, including:

- Cost and price disease: Prices in stagnant industries tend to grow faster than average
- Stagnant output: Real output in low-productivity-growth industries tends to grow more slowly relative to the overall economy
- Employment effects: Firms in stagnant industries may reduce employment, decrease hours, or increase non-monetary compensation

An important implication of the Baumol effect is that it should be expected that, in a world with technological progress, the costs of manufactured goods will tend to fall (as productivity in manufacturing continually increases) while the costs of labor-intensive services like education, legal services, and health care (where productivity growth is persistently slow) will tend to rise (see chart). (Note: Note that low productivity growth does not afflict all services. Telecommunications, for example, has seen substantial productivity growth. Service industries are simply more likely than manufactured goods industries to be immune to productivity growth, for the reasons that they are often less able to be standardized and that the quality of services is more likely to be closely linked to the amount of labor provided.)

A 2008 study by American economist William Nordhaus showed as much, concluding that "Baumol-type diseases" in technologically stagnant sectors have led to "rising relative prices and declining relative real outputs." In the realm of prices, Nordhaus showed that in the United States from 1948–2001 "productivity trends are associated almost percentage-point for percentage-point with price decline." Industries with low productivity growth thus saw their relative prices increase, leading Nordhaus to conclude: "The hypothesis of a cost-price disease due to slow productivity growth is strongly supported by the historical data. Industries with relatively lower productivity growth show a percentage-point for percentage-point higher growth in relative prices." A similar conclusion held for real output: "The real output/stagnation hypothesis is strongly confirmed. Technologically stagnant industries have shown slower growth in real output than have the technologically dynamic ones. A one percentage-point higher productivity growth was associated with a three-quarters percentage-point higher real output growth."

=== Affordability and inequality ===
While the Baumol effect suggests that costs in low-productivity-growth industries will continually rise, Baumol argues that the "stagnant-sector services will never become unaffordable to society. This is because the economy's constantly growing productivity simultaneously increases the population's overall purchasing power." To see this, consider an economy with a real national income of $100 billion with healthcare spending amounting to $20 billion (20% of national income), leaving $80 billion for other purchases. Say that, over 50 years, due to productivity growth, real national income doubles to $200 billion (an annual growth rate of about 1.4%). In this case, even if healthcare spending were to rise by 500% to $120 billion, there would still be $80 billion left over for other purchases—exactly the same amount as 50 years prior. In this scenario, healthcare now accounts for 60% of national income, compared to 20% fifty years prior, and yet the amount of income left to purchase other goods remains unchanged. Further, if healthcare costs were to account for anything less than 60% of national income, there would be more income left over for other purchases (for instance, if healthcare costs were to rise from 20% of national income to 40% of national income, there would be $120 billion left over for other purchases—40% more than 50 years prior). So it can be seen that even if productivity growth were to lead to substantial healthcare cost increases as a result of Baumol's cost disease, the wealth increase brought on by that productivity growth would still leave society able to purchase more goods than before.

While this is true for society in the aggregate, it is not the case for all workers as individuals. Baumol noted that the increase in costs "disproportionally affects the poor." Although a person's income may increase over time, and the affordability of manufactured goods may increase too, the price increases in industries subject to the Baumol effect can be larger than the increase in many workers' wages (see chart above, note average wages). These services become less affordable, especially to low-income earners, despite the overall economic growth. This effect is exacerbated by the increase in income inequality observed in recent decades.

=== Government spending ===
The Baumol effect has major implications for government spending. Since most government spending goes towards services that are subject to the cost disease—law enforcement, education, healthcare, etc.—the cost to the government of providing these services will rise as time goes on.

=== Labor force distribution ===
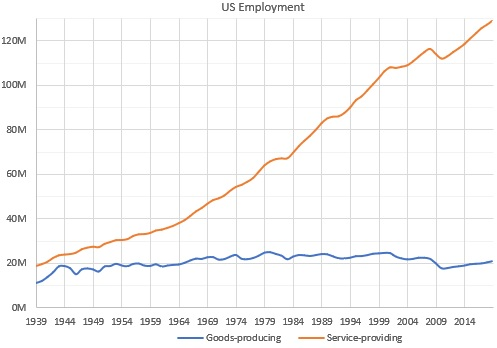
Employment in the United States has been rising in the service sector mainly.

One implication of the Baumol effect is a shift in the distribution of the labor force from high-productivity industries to low-productivity industries. In other words, the effect predicts that the share of the workforce employed in low-productivity industries will rise over time.

The reasoning behind this can be seen through a thought experiment offered by Baumol in his book The Cost Disease:

Let us assume for simplicity that the share of the economy's total output that comes from the progressive sector [industries with high productivity growth], as measured in physical units rather than money, does not change. Because the economy has only two sectors, progressive and stagnant [industries with low productivity growth], whose production together accounts for all of its output, it follows that the stagnant sector also must maintain a constant share of the total.

This has significant implications for the distribution of the economy's labor force. By definition, labor productivity grows significantly faster in the progressive sector than in the stagnant sector, so to keep a constant proportion between the two sectors' output, more and more labor has to move from the progressive sector into the stagnant sector. (Note: A technical description of this effect can be found in Technical description)

As predicted by the Baumol effect, the proportion of the United States labor force employed in stagnant industries has grown substantially since the 1960s. In particular, the United States has morphed from a manufacturing economy into a service economy (see chart). However, how much of this is due to the Baumol effect rather than other causes is disputed. In a 2010 study, the economist Talan B. İşcan devised a model from which he concluded that both Baumol and Engel effects played significant roles in the rising share of employment in services in the United States (though he noted that "considerable gaps between the calibrated model and the actual data remain"). An older 1968 study by economist Victor Fuchs likewise concluded that the Baumol effect played a major role in the shift to services, although he determined that demand shifts like those proposed in Engel's law played only a minor role. The economists Robert Rowthorn and Ramana Ramaswamy also concluded that relatively faster growth of productivity in manufacturing played a role in the shift to services. The economist Tom Elfring, however, argued in a 1989 paper that the Baumol effect has played a secondary role to growth in demand for services since the 1970s. Alternative theories for the shift to services include demand-side theories (the Baumol effect is broadly a supply-side explanation) like the three-sector model devised by Allan Fisher and Colin Clark in the 1930s, which posit that services satisfy higher needs than goods and so as income grows a higher share of income will be used for the purchase of services; changes in the inter-industry division of labor, favoring specialized service activities; outsourcing to countries with lower labor costs; increasing participation of women in the labor force; and trade specialization.

The Baumol effect has also been used to describe the reallocation of labor out of agriculture (in the United States, in 1930 21.5% of the workforce was employed in agriculture and agriculture made up 7.7% of GDP; by 2000, only 1.9% of the workforce was employed in agriculture and agriculture made up only 0.7% of GDP). In a 2009 study, the economists Benjamin N. Dennis and Talan B. İşcan concluded that after the 1950s relatively faster productivity growth in agriculture was the key driver behind the continuing shift in employment from agriculture to non-farm goods (prior to the 1950s, they determined that Engel's law explained almost all labor reallocation out of agriculture).

=== Economic growth and aggregate productivity ===
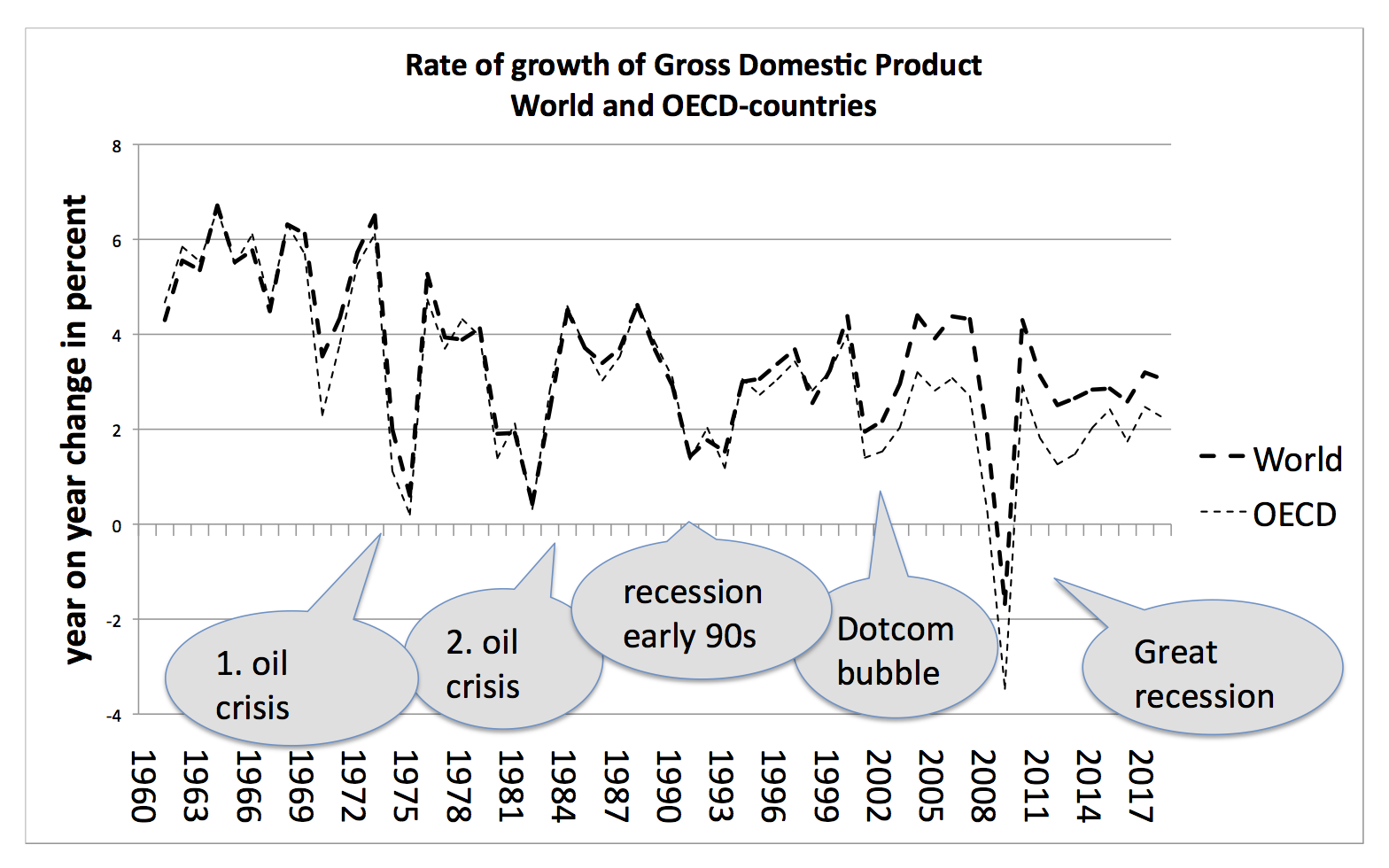
The Baumol effect predicts declining economic growth

In his original paper on the cost disease, Baumol argued that in the long run the cost disease implies a reduction in aggregate productivity growth and correspondingly a reduction in economic growth. This follows straightforwardly from the labor distribution effects of the cost disease. As a larger and larger share of the workforce moves from high-productivity-growth industries to low-productivity-growth industries, it is natural to expect that the overall rate of productivity growth will slow. Since economic growth is driven in large part by productivity growth, economic growth would also slow.

The economist Nicholas Oulton, however, argued in a 2001 paper that the Baumol effect may counterintuitively result in an increase in aggregate productivity growth. This could occur if many services produce intermediate inputs for the manufacturing sector, i.e. if a significant number of services are business services. (Note: In the two-sector model Baumol devised in his original paper (see Technical description), services are produced only for final consumption.) In this case, even though the slow-growth service sector is increasing in size, because these services further boost the productivity growth of the shrinking manufacturing sector, overall productivity growth may actually increase. Relatedly, the economist Maurizio Pugno described how many stagnant services, like education and healthcare, contribute to human capital formation, which enhances growth and thus "opposes the negative Baumol effect on growth."

The economist Hiroaki Sasaki, however, disputed Oulton's argument in a 2007 paper. Sasaki constructed an economic model that takes into account the use of services as intermediate inputs in high-productivity-growth industries and still concluded that a shift in labor force distribution from higher-productivity-growth manufacturing to lower-productivity-growth services decreases the rate of economic growth in the long run. Likewise, the economists Jochen Hartwig and Hagen Krämer concluded in a 2019 paper that, while Outlon's theory is "logically consistent", it is "not in line with the data", which shows a lowering of aggregate productivity growth.

== Sectors ==
=== Education ===
The Baumol effect has been applied to the education sector, including by Baumol himself. By most measures, productivity growth in the education sector over the last several decades has been low or even negative; the average student-teacher ratio in American universities, for instance, was sixteen to one in 2011, just as it was in 1981. Yet, over this period, tuition costs have risen substantially. It has been proposed that this is at least partially explained by the Baumol effect: even though there has been little or even negative productivity growth in the education sector, because of productivity increases across other sectors of the economy universities today would not be able to attract professors with 1980s-level salaries, so they are forced to raise wages to maintain their workforce. To afford the increased labor costs, universities raise tuition fees (i.e. they increase prices).

Evidence on the role of the Baumol effect in rising education costs has been mixed. Economists Robert B. Archibald and David H. Feldman, both of the College of William & Mary, argued in a 2006 study, for instance, that the Baumol effect is the dominant driver behind increasing higher education costs. Other studies, however, have found a lesser role for the Baumol effect. In a 2014 study, the economists Robert E. Martin and Carter Hill devised a model that determined that the Baumol effect explained only 23%–32% of the rise in higher education costs. The economists Gary Rhoades and Joanna Frye went further in a 2015 study and argued that the Baumol effect could not explain rising tuition costs at all, as "relative academic labor costs have gone down as tuition has gone up." The cost disease may also have only limited effects on primary and secondary education: a 2016 study on per-pupil public education spending by Manabu Nose, an economist at the International Monetary Fund, found that "the contribution of Baumol's effect was much smaller than implied by theory"; Nose argued that it was instead rising wage premiums paid for teachers in excess of market wages that were the dominant reason for increasing costs, particularly in developing countries.

Alternative explanations for rising higher education costs include Bowen's revenue theory of cost, reduced public subsidies for education, administrative bloat, the commercialization of higher education, increased demand for higher education, the easy availability of federal student loans, difficulty comparing prices of different universities, technological change, and lack of a central mechanism to control price increases.

=== Healthcare ===
The Baumol effect has been applied to the rising cost of healthcare, as the healthcare industry has long had low productivity growth. Empirical studies have largely confirmed the large role of the Baumol effect in the rising cost of healthcare in the United States, although there is some disagreement. Likewise, a 2021 study determined that "Baumol's cost disease ha[s] a significant positive impact on health expenditure growth" in China. However, a paper by economists Bradley Rossen and Akhter Faroque on healthcare costs in Canada found that "the cost disease ... is a relatively minor contributor [in the growth of health-care spending in Canada], while technical progress in health care and growth in per capita incomes are by far the biggest contributors."

Despite substantial technological innovation and capital investment, the healthcare industry has struggled to significantly increase productivity. As summarized by the economists Alberto Marino, David Morgan, Luca Lorenzoni, and Chris James:

Technological advancements, capital investments and economies of scale do not make for a cumulative rise in output that is on par with progressive sectors of the economy ... [A]utomation and better technology generally do not allow for large productivity increases. A health professional is difficult to substitute, in particular by using new technologies, which may actually also bring an increase in volume (e.g. faster diagnostic tests). Increases in volume likely brought about by new technology will also drive up expenditure, since new health professionals will have to be hired to treat everyone. Moreover, new technologies require more specialised training for, say, [sic] doctors, driving wages up further since more years of experience are required.

=== Service industry ===
Baumol's cost disease is often used to describe consequences of the lack of growth in productivity in the quaternary sector of the economy and public services, such as public hospitals and state colleges. Labor-intensive sectors that rely heavily on non-routine human interaction or activities, such as health care, education, or the performing arts, have had less growth in productivity over time. As with the string quartet example, it takes nurses the same amount of time to change a bandage or college professors the same amount of time to mark an essay today as it did in 1966. In contrast, goods-producing industries, such as the car manufacturing sector and other activities that involve routine tasks, workers are continually becoming more productive by technological innovations to their tools and equipment.

The reported productivity gains of the service industry in the late 1990s are largely attributable to total factor productivity. Providers decreased the cost of ancillary labor through outsourcing or technology. Examples include offshoring data entry and bookkeeping for health care providers and replacing manually-marked essays in educational assessment with multiple choice tests that can be automatically marked.

== Technical description ==
In the 1967 paper Macroeconomics of Unbalanced Growth: The Anatomy of Urban Crisis, Baumol introduced a simple two-sector model to demonstrate the cost disease. To do so, he imagined an economy consisting of only two sectors: sector one, which has constant productivity (that is, the number of goods workers can produce per man hour does not change as time goes on), and sector two, which sees productivity grow at a constant compounded rate $r$ (that is, the number of goods workers can produce per man hour grows at a rate $e^{rt}$, where $t$ is time). To simplify, he assumed that the quantity of goods produced by these two sectors (the "output" of each of the two sectors) is directly proportional to the quantity of labor employed (that is, doubling the number of workers doubles the output, tripling the number of workers triples the output, and so on) and that output depends only upon labor productivity and the quantity of labor. Since there is no increase in labor productivity in sector one, the output of sector one at time $t$ (denoted $Y_{1t}$) is:

$$Y_{1t}=aL_{1t}$$

where $L_{1t}$ is the quantity of labor employed in sector one and $a$ is a constant that can be thought of as the amount of output each worker can produce at time $t=0$. This equation simply says that the amount of output sector one produces equals the number of workers in sector one multiplied by the number of goods each worker can produce. Since productivity does not increase, the number of goods each worker produces remains $a$, and output remains constant through time for a given number of workers.

Since the labor productivity of sector two increases at a constant compounded rate $r$, the output of sector two at time $t$ (denoted $Y_{2t}$) is:

$$Y_{2t}=bL_{2t}e^{rt}$$

where $L_{2t}$ is the quantity of labor employed in sector two and $b$ is a constant that can be thought of as the amount of output each worker can produce at time $t=0$. Since productivity grows at a constant compounded rate $r$, the number of goods each worker produces at time $t$ equals $be^{rt}$, and the output of sector two grows at a rate proportional to productivity growth.

To more clearly demonstrate how wages and costs change through time, wages in both sectors are originally set at the same value $W$. It is then assumed that wages rise in direct proportion to productivity (i.e., a doubling of productivity results in a doubling of wages, a tripling of productivity results in a tripling of wages, and so on). This means that the wages of the two sectors at time $t$ determined solely by productivity are:

$$W_{1t} = W$$

(since productivity remains unchanged), and

$$W_{2t} = We^{rt}$$

(since productivity increases at a rate $e^{rt}$).

These values, however, assume that workers do not move between the two sectors. If workers are equally capable of working in either sector, and they choose which sector to work in based upon which offers a higher wage, then they will always choose to work in the sector that offers the higher wage. This means that if sector one were to keep wages fixed at $W$, then as wages in sector two grow with productivity workers in sector one would quit and seek jobs in sector two. Firms in sector one are thus forced to raise wages to attract workers. More precisely, in this model the only way firms in either sector can attract workers is to offer the same wage as firms in the other sector—if one sector were to offer lower wages, then all workers would work in the other sector.

So to maintain their workforces, wages in the two sectors must equal each other: $W_{1t} = W_{2t}$. And since it is sector two that sees its wage naturally rise with productivity, while sector one's does not naturally rise, it must be the case that:

$$W_{1t}=W_{2t}=We^{rt}.$$

This typifies the labor aspect of the Baumol effect: as productivity growth in one sector of the economy drives up that sector's wages, firms in sectors without productivity growth must also raise wages to compete for workers. (Note: Note that this is an assumption of the model. As Baumol states in the original paper, "We suppose wages are equal in the two sectors and are fixed at $W_t$ dollars per unit of labor, where $W_t$ itself grows in accord with the productivity of sector 2, our 'progressive' sector." The preceding two paragraphs simply demonstrate the logic of that assumption.)

From this simple model, the consequences on the costs per unit output in the two sectors can be derived. Since the only factor of production within this model is labor, each sector's total cost is the wage paid to workers multiplied by the total number of workers. The cost per unit output is the total cost divided by the amount of output, so with $C_{1t}$ representing the unit cost of goods in sector one at time $t$ and $C_{2t}$ representing the unit cost of goods in sector two at time $t$:

$$\begin{align}
C_{1t}&=\frac{W_{1t}L_{1t}}{Y_{1t}} \\
C_{2t}&=\frac{W_{2t}L_{2t}}{Y_{2t}}
\end{align}$$

Plugging in the values for $W_{1t}, Y_{1t}, W_{2t}$ and $Y_{2t}$ from above:

$$\begin{align}
C_{1t} &= \frac{W_{1t}L_{1t}}{Y_{1t}} \\
&= \frac{We^{rt}L_{1t}}{aL_{1t}} \\
&= \frac{1}{a}We^{rt} \\
C_{2t} &= \frac{W_{2t}L_{2t}}{Y_{2t}} \\
&= \frac{We^{rt}L_{2t}}{bL_{2t}e^{rt}} \\
&= \frac{1}{b}W
\end{align}$$

It can be seen that in the sector with growing labor productivity (sector two), the cost per unit output $C_{2t}$ is constant since both wages and output rise at the same rate. However, in the sector with stagnant labor productivity (sector one), the cost per unit output $C_{1t}$ rises exponentially since wages rise exponentially faster than output.

This demonstrates the cost aspect of the Baumol effect (the "cost disease"). While costs in sectors with productivity growth do not increase, in sectors with little to no productivity growth costs necessarily rise due to the rising prevailing wage. Furthermore, if the productivity growth differential persists (that is, the low-productivity-growth sectors continue to see low productivity growth into the future while high-productivity-growth sectors continue to see high productivity growth), then costs in low-productivity-growth sectors will rise cumulatively and without limit.

Baumol's model can also be used to demonstrate the effect on the distribution of labor. Assume that, despite the change in the relative costs and prices of the two industries, the magnitude of the relative outputs of the two sectors are maintained. A situation similar to this could occur, for instance, "with the aid of government subsidy, or if demand for the product in question were sufficiently price inelastic or income elastic." The output ratio and its relation to the labor ratio, ignoring constants $a$ and $b$, is then given by:

$$\frac{Y_1}{Y_2}= \frac{L_{1t}}{L_{2t}e^{rt}} = K$$

Letting $L=L_1 + L_2$ (i.e. $L$ is the total labor supply), it follows that:

$$\begin{align}
L_1 &= (L - L_1)Ke^{rt} \textrm{or} \\
L_1 &= \frac{LKe^{rt}}{1+Ke^{rt}} \\
L_2 &= L - L_1 = \frac{L}{1+Ke^{rt}}
\end{align}$$

It can be seen that as $t$ approaches infinity, the quantity of labor in the non-progressive sector $L_1$ approaches the total labor supply $L$ while the quantity of labor in the progressive sector $L_2$ approaches zero. Hence, "if the ratio of the outputs of the two sectors is held constant, more and more of the total labor force must be transferred to the non-progressive sector and the amount of labor in the other sector will tend to approach zero."

== See also ==
- Paradox of toil
- Cost disease socialism
- Occupational licensing

== Sources ==
- Baumol, William J. (2012). The Cost Disease: Why Computers Get Cheaper and Health Care Doesn't. Yale University Press. ISBN 978-0-300-19815-7.
