= Cost disease socialism =

Proposed concept to describe an economic pattern

Cost disease socialism is a proposed concept by Steven M. Teles, Samuel Hammond, and Daniel Takash of the Niskanen Center. It describes an economic pattern in which the subsidy of essential goods and services, coupled with limitations or regulatory constraints on new supply, increases the price without increasing the quantity provided.

== History ==
"Cost disease socialism" was termed by Steven M. Teles, Samuel Hammond, and Daniel Takash, in their 2021 report published through the Niskanen Center. Despite the similar name, it is not related to Baumol's cost disease, which is an alternative hypothesis for why costs go up in sectors with slower productivity growth. While Baumol's cost disease is focused on services, cost disease socialism can be applied to any essential good or service.

== Economic theory ==
Elastic supply with increased demand. Under these market conditions, when demand is increased due to subsidy, both the quantity provided and the price increase.

Inelastic supply with increased demand. Under these market conditions, when demand is increased due to subsidy, the quantity provided remains limited and the price increases more than it would have if the supply were elastic.

Cost disease socialism contrasts with other theories of why costs become high, such as Baumol's cost disease, luxury goods effects from increasing incomes, rent-seeking, and red tape. Cost disease socialism happens when essential goods or services are subsidized through government or philanthropy, with limitations or regulatory constraints on new supply.

== Applications ==
=== Healthcare ===
==== Kidney dialysis ====
As of 2021, Medicare is 14% of total federal spending in the United States, and nearly 7% of Medicare money is used for dialysis treatments, which are fully covered. In the United States, dialysis typically takes place in clinics, and costs $87,000 per year. In contrast, other countries use home-based dialysis, which is cheaper and preferred by patients. In the United States, the dialysis industry is an oligopoly, with 83% of the market served by two companies, DaVita and Fresenius. Medicare pays treatment providers per treatment, which may disincentivize better outcomes for the patient, such as preparation for kidney transplant. DaVita employees have been recorded by the Last Week Tonight show misleadingly telling patients that transplant is an equivalent option to dialysis, even though transplant results in a two to three times increased life expectancy.

==== Hearing aids ====
As of 2022, 37.5 million people in the United States have hearing loss but only 20% use a hearing aid. Senator Bernie Sanders added a provision to the Build Back Better Plan to increase government subsidy for hearing aids. The plan did not pass, and Hammond, Takash, and Teles criticized the plan, saying that "socializing costs while restricting supply will produce greater inflation". Later that year, United States president Joe Biden signed an executive order allowing hearing aids for hearing loss diagnosed as less than severe to be sold over the counter without a prescription, which was expected to result in 63 million dollars per year in savings for consumers on hearing device products.

=== Post-secondary education ===
In 2017, the New York Federal Reserve found that when subsidy of student loans was increased, 60% of the increase translated directly into tuition fee hikes, without any change in the post-secondary education that students were receiving. The Niskanen Center holds that supply of essential goods is often constrained by regulation. Aside from the supply, the quality of post-secondary education needs to improve for it to be worthwhile. At for-profit colleges, students who complete their degrees earn $3,500 to $4,000 more on average per year. Students who started post-secondary education without necessarily finishing it had on average a negative salary change, perhaps because dropping out of college is a negative signal on a resumé. A study found that increases in the cost of providing post-secondary education from 2003 to 2013 were largely driven by increases in the numbers of non-teaching student services and administrative staff at schools.

=== Housing ===
One paper estimates that if housing were not constrained in the cities of New York, San Francisco, and San Jose, the United States GDP would be 4% higher. This is because high rents cost more money without increasing productivity. In the average city, a tech worker moving in creates five other jobs; in San Francisco, local economist Tom Egan estimates that the same professional creates just over two jobs on average because so much of people's income goes towards rent. According to the cost disease socialism theory, government attempts to alleviate the high cost of rent through subsidies and rent controls lead to higher prices in the absence of regulatory attempts to increase the supply of housing. Additionally, some researchers find that rent control can have a net negative effect even for tenants under rent control, taking into account decreased landlord incentive to maintain housing quality, and tenants not being able to move out of poor quality housing due to higher prices in the uncontrolled sector.

=== Child care ===
The Build Back Better plan proposed in 2021 was called by Hammond, Takash, and Teles "an extreme example" of cost disease socialism when it came to child care. The bill included subsidizing 90% of child care costs while increasing them through increasing child care provider salaries and mandating child care provider credentials. The bill could also have potentially reduced supply by disallowing some informal care programs, such as those hosted by religious institutions.

== See also ==
- Supply-side progressivism
