= Work in Progress (1951 film) =

Work in Progress is a 25-minute documentary which is part of the British Transport Films Collection. It was made in 1951 and covers various aspects of British Transport as described below.

== Tunnel through the Pennines ==
First is a piece on a third 3-mile (4.8 km) tunnel being excavated under the Pennines at Woodhead, Derbyshire, estimated to take three years to complete. Tunnelers are shown being lowered into a 500-foot (150 m) ventilation shaft, from where they use shovels to dig out blasted rock.

== Road haulage in Scotland ==
Second topic is the work of British Road Services in Campbeltown, Scotland.

== Marshalling in Cambridgeshire ==
The third topic shows the work of the Whitemoor marshalling yard in Cambridgeshire.

== Buses in Bristol ==
The fourth topic shows the bus system in Bristol, showing how the company deals with a complaint from a customer and also shows factory workers rushing at the end of shift to a fleet of buses, where it is claimed that 6,000 are moved in 20 minutes.

== Ferry across the Channel ==
The fifth topic shows the ferry from Calais to Dover, and how its radar is used to navigate into Dover Harbour in fog.
