= Institute for Progress =

American think tank

- Abbreviation: IFP
- Formation: 2022; 4 years ago
- Type: Public policy think tank
- Headquarters: Washington, D.C.
- Key people: Alec Stapp (Co-founder and CEO); Caleb Watney (Co-founder); Tim Fist (President)
- Website: ifp.org

The Institute for Progress, known simply as IFP, is a Washington, D.C.–based non-partisan think tank that researches industrial, technological, and scientific progress. Founded in 2022, IFP seeks to bring ideas from progress studies to policymakers.

== Personnel ==
IFP was cofounded by Alec Stapp and Caleb Watney. Prior to founding IFP, they both served as policy directors at the Progressive Policy Institute and as fellows at the Mercatus Center. They have master's degrees in economics from George Mason University. Caleb Watney stepped down from his position as co-CEO in 2026.

IFP's other staff include President Tim Fist, Director of Science Policy Heidi Williams, Director of Emerging Technology Policy Janet Egan, Director of Immigration Policy Jeremy Neufeld, and Senior Infrastructure Fellow Brian Potter.

IFP also has a number of affiliated scholars and experts as senior fellows, including Pierre Azoulay, Ina Ganguli, Benjamin Jones from Northwestern University, Paul Niehaus, geneticist and biosecurity expert Nikki Teran, and Kyle Myers from Harvard Business School.

== Policy areas ==
IFP engages in research and political advocacy in three key policy areas: metascience, high-skilled immigration, biosecurity, and emerging technology. In an interview, cofounder Caleb Watney described the think tank's strategy, noting that on many issues, "there is a sweet spot in the middle between flying completely under the radar and trying to mount a loud, activist campaign. We agree with the 'Secret Congress' theory of modern DC policymaking, which says that the issues most likely to gain traction are often the ones that get talked about the least on cable news and stay off the front page of newspapers."

=== Metascience policy ===
IFP has promoted more experimentation and diversification in the way the U.S. federal government funds scientific research. Co-CEO Caleb Watney and Director of Science Policy Heidi Williams have argued for a public biomedical innovation fund housed at the Advanced Research Projects Agency for Health. They have also proposed experimental funding mechanisms at the National Institutes of Health. IFP has published proposals to pilot new grantmaking processes at the National Science Foundation and to establish a new system of National Laboratory Schools.

=== High-skilled immigration policy ===
IFP has emphasized the importance of immigrants to American science and innovation. IFP's senior immigration fellow Jeremy Neufeld has proposed extending the Optional Practical Training period for international students and expanding O-1 visa eligibility. Neufeld has advocated for reforms to increase foreign STEM talent in the US to compliment investments in semiconductor manufacturing by the CHIPS Act. Neufeld has also advocated reforming the H-1B visa system to replace the lottery with merit-based selection.

=== Biosecurity policy ===
IFP research in biosecurity focuses on issues related to preventing and mitigating the harms from future pandemics as well as accelerating progress in the life sciences. Senior biosecurity fellow Nikki Teran has expressed support for comprehensive biosecurity policy reform, including the PREVENT Pandemics Act, and has analyzed how spending in the bill compares to proposed spending in the American Pandemic Preparedness Plan. She also criticized the federal government's response to the 2022 Monkeypox outbreak, attributing a lack of effective vaccinations and treatments to administrative failures.
