= Heidi Williams =

American economist

- Born: 1981 (age 44–45); United States
- Education: Dartmouth College; Oxford University; Harvard University
- Known for: Economics of Innovation
- Scientific career
- Fields: Economist
- Workplaces: Dartmouth College
- Doctoral advisor: David Cutler; Amy Finkelstein; Lawrence F. Katz

Heidi Williams (born 1981) is an American professor of economics at Dartmouth College and Director of Science Policy at the Institute for Progress. She is a graduate of Dartmouth College, and earned her MSc in development economics from Oxford University and her PhD in economics from Harvard University. Prior to Dartmouth, Williams was the Charles R. Schwab Professor of Economics at Stanford University and an associate professor at the Massachusetts Institute of Technology. She is a member of the National Bureau of Economic Research and a co-editor of the Journal of Economic Perspectives.

Williams is an applied micro-economist who works on the causes and consequences of technological change in health care markets. Specifically, she studies economic and policy factors that affect medical innovation, and quantifies the impacts of "missing innovation" that could have been beneficial for human health and medicine. She is most well known for her work on the Human Genome Project. In her dissertation research, Williams shows that intellectual property held by the company Celera on human genome sequences had negative consequences for the development of scientific research and genetic tests based on those genes. In some other work, Williams and her co-authors show that pharmaceutical firms under-invest in research in early-stage cancer drugs because they take longer time to get to market, as compared to drugs for late-stage cancer.

In 2015, Williams was made a MacArthur Fellow, a grant given yearly to 25 people around the world to continue work in their fields. Her citation for that award noted:

Heidi Williams is an economist unraveling the causes and consequences of innovation in health care markets. Williams combines finely grained empirical observations and custom-designed data collection methods to build entirely new datasets about technological changes in health care. In addition, her creative methods for determining causal inference, and keen understanding of regulatory law, biological science, and medical research, have allowed her to trace the interplay among institutions, market behavior, and public policy–relevant outcomes.

In June 2021, Williams was a co-recipient of the biennial ASHEcon Medal, an award from the American Society of Health Economists for researchers aged 40 and under who have made significant contributions to the field of health economics.

== Publications ==
- Finkelstein, Amy; Gentzkow, Matthew; ——— (2016). "Sources of Geographic Variation in Health Care: Evidence from Patient Migration". Quarterly Journal of Economics. 131 (4): 1681–1726. doi:10.3386/w20789. PMC 5243120. PMID 28111482.
- Chen, Alice; Oster, Emily; ——— (2016). "Why is Infant Mortality Higher in the US Than in Europe?". American Economic Journal: Economic Policy. 8 (2): 89–124. doi:10.3386/w20525. PMC 4856058. PMID 27158418.
- Einav, Liran; Finkelstein, Amy; ——— (2016). "Paying on the Margin for Medical Care: Evidence from Breast Cancer Treatments". American Economic Journal: Economic Policy. 8 (1): 52–79. doi:10.3386/w20226. PMC 4758371. PMID 26900414.
- Budish, Eric; Roin, Benjamin; ——— (2015). "Do Firms Underinvest in Long-Term Research? Evidence from Cancer Clinical Trials". American Economic Review. 105 (7): 2044–2085. doi:10.1257/aer.20131176. PMC 4557975. PMID 26345455.
- ——— (2013). "Intellectual Property Rights and Innovation: Evidence from the Human Genome". Journal of Political Economy. 121 (1): 1–27. doi:10.1086/669706. PMC 3955392. PMID 24639594.
- Almond, Douglas; Doyle, Joseph; Kowalski, Amanda; ——— (2010). "Estimating Marginal Returns to Medical Care: Evidence from At-Risk Newborns". Quarterly Journal of Economics. 125 (2): 591–634. doi:10.1162/qjec.2010.125.2.591. PMC 2903901. PMID 20634927.
