= Derek Thompson (journalist) =

American journalist (born 1986)

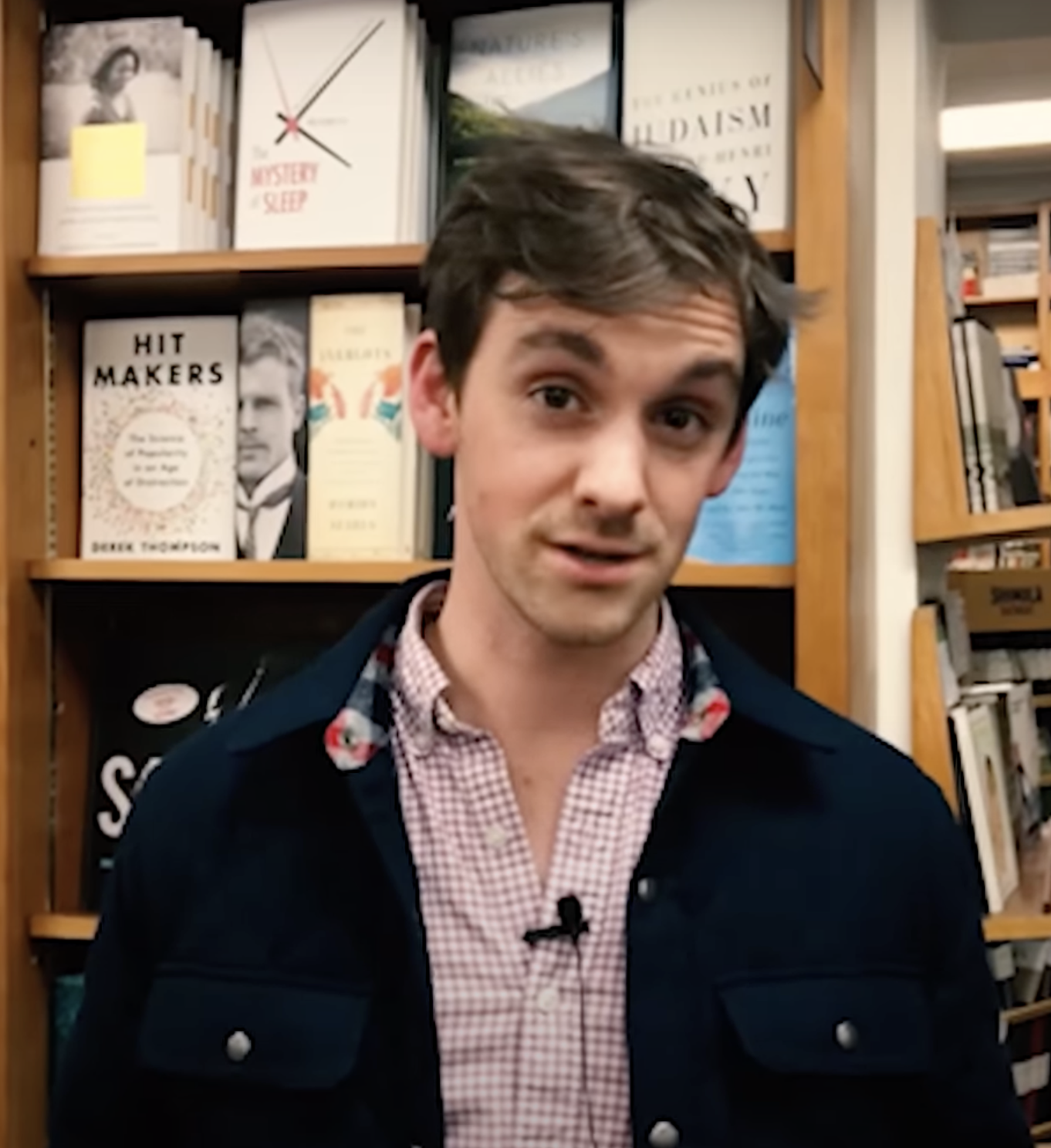
- Thompson in 2017
- Born: May 18, 1986 (age 40); McLean, Virginia, U.S.
- Education: Northwestern University (BA)
- Occupations: Journalist; podcaster

Derek Kahn Thompson (born May 18, 1986) is an American podcaster and journalist. He is a contributing writer at The Atlantic and a columnist for The Argument. Thompson is also the author of Hit Makers: How to Succeed in an Age of Distraction and, with Ezra Klein, the co-author of Abundance.

== Early life ==
Derek Thompson was born in McLean, Virginia, the son of Robert Thompson and Petra Kahn. Before graduating from high school, he appeared in several theatrical productions at the Folger Shakespeare Library and the Shakespeare Theater. After attending the Potomac School, Thompson graduated from Northwestern University in 2008 with a triple major in journalism, political science, and legal studies.

== Career ==
Thompson began as a writer at The Atlantic in 2009. Starting in 2018, he became the host of the technology and science podcast Crazy/Genius, which was nominated for an iHeartMedia Best Podcast Award in its first year. In November 2021, Thompson began hosting a weekly headline podcast titled Plain English as a part of The Ringer's podcast network.

Thompson has written three cover stories for the magazine. The first, "A World Without Work", is a widely referenced essay on the meaning of work and automation's threat to the labor force. The second was a lengthy profile of X, the research and development division of Alphabet. The third, "The Anti-Social Century", published in the magazine's February 2025 issue, points out that Americans are spending more time alone than ever before. Thompson contends that this surge in solitude is fundamentally reshaping personalities, politics, and culture, noting that people are increasingly opting for solitude even when it doesn't make them happier.

In 2017, Thompson published his first book, Hit Makers: How to Succeed in an Age of Distraction. It was the winner of the American Marketing Association's Leonard L. Berry Marketing Book Award for the best marketing book of 2018. Thompson coauthored his next book, Abundance, with Ezra Klein. The book argues that shortages of key pillars of "the good life" — housing, energy, healthcare, and innovation — are the result of artificial, policy-driven scarcities in liberal policy-making.

After 17 years at The Atlantic, Thompson left his full-time role to write independently on Substack in June 2025, although he remains a contributing writer for the magazine. In a post explaining the move, he cited a desire for more editorial freedom and to write for himself after almost two decades at a single publication.

== Personal life ==
Thompson describes himself as a secular Reform Jew. As of 2025, he and his wife reside in Chapel Hill, North Carolina, with their daughter. He is a subscriber to effective altruism.

== Bibliography ==
- Thompson, Derek (2017). Hit Makers: The Science of Popularity in an Age of Distraction. New York: Penguin Press. ISBN 978-1-101-98032-3.
- Thompson, Derek (2023). On Work: Money, Meaning, Identity. Zando. ISBN 978-1-63893-073-0.
- Klein, Ezra; Thompson, Derek (2025). Abundance. New York: Avid Reader Press. ISBN 978-1-6680-2348-8.
