= Brittany Pettersen =

American politician (born 1981)

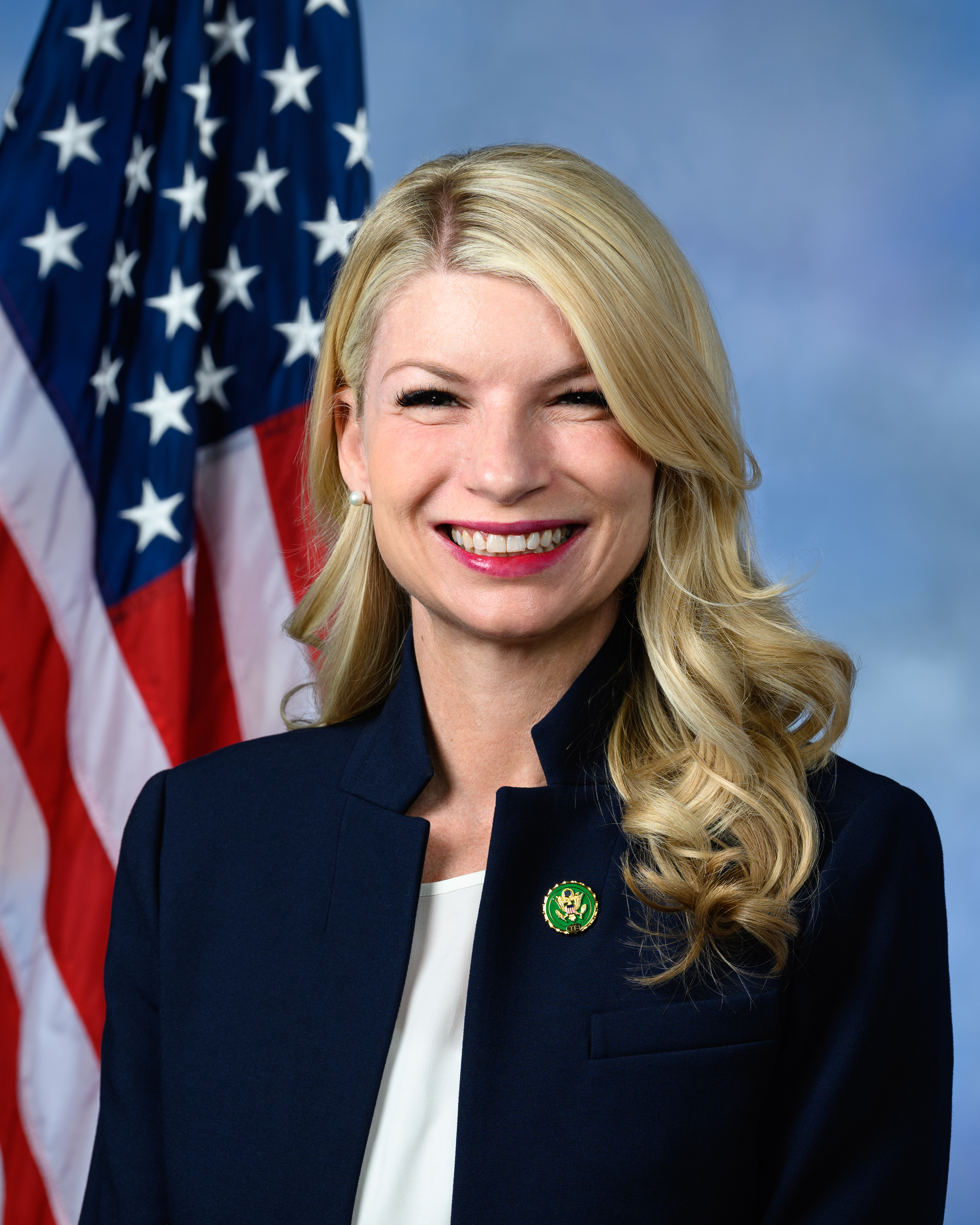
- Official Portrait, 2023

Member of the U.S. House of Representatives from Colorado's 7th district
- Incumbent
- Assumed office January 3, 2023
- Preceded by: Ed Perlmutter

Member of the Colorado Senate from the 22nd district
- In office January 4, 2019 – January 3, 2023
- Preceded by: Andy Kerr
- Succeeded by: Jessie Danielson

Member of the Colorado House of Representatives from the 28th district
- In office January 9, 2013 – January 4, 2019
- Preceded by: Andy Kerr
- Succeeded by: Kerry Tipper

Personal details
- Born: Brittany Louise Pettersen; December 6, 1981 (age 44) Jefferson County, Colorado, U.S.
- Party: Democratic
- Spouse: Ian Silverii (m. 2017)
- Children: 2
- Education: Metropolitan State University of Denver (BA)
- Website: House website Campaign website

Brittany Louise Pettersen (born December 6, 1981) is an American politician serving as the U.S. representative from Colorado's 7th congressional district since 2023. She previously served as a member of the Colorado Senate from the 22nd district, and in the Colorado House of Representatives, representing the 28th district. She is a member of the Democratic Party.

== Education ==
Pettersen earned a Bachelor of Arts degree in political science from the Metropolitan State University of Denver.

== Early political career ==
Before running for state representative, Pettersen worked for New Era Colorado, a nonprofit progressive political advocacy group that works to increase youth participation in politics and the government process.

=== 2013 legislative session ===
In 2013, Pettersen opposed a repeal of the death penalty in Colorado.

=== 2019 recall effort ===
In July 2019, the Colorado secretary of state approved the circulation of a recall petition against Pettersen. The recall's organizers had until September 16, 2019, to gather 18,376 signatures to put the recall on the ballot, but on September 10 they announced that they were abandoning the effort and not submitting signatures. The recall petition stated that Pettersen should be recalled because she supports taxpayer-funded heroin-injection sites, and because she supported SB 19-042 (the National Popular Vote bill), SB 19-181 (Comprehensive Oil and Gas Reform), HB 19-1032 (Comprehensive Human Sexuality Education), and HB 19-1177 (the Red Flag bill that allows a judge to prohibit an individual from possessing a firearm).

== U.S. House of Representatives ==
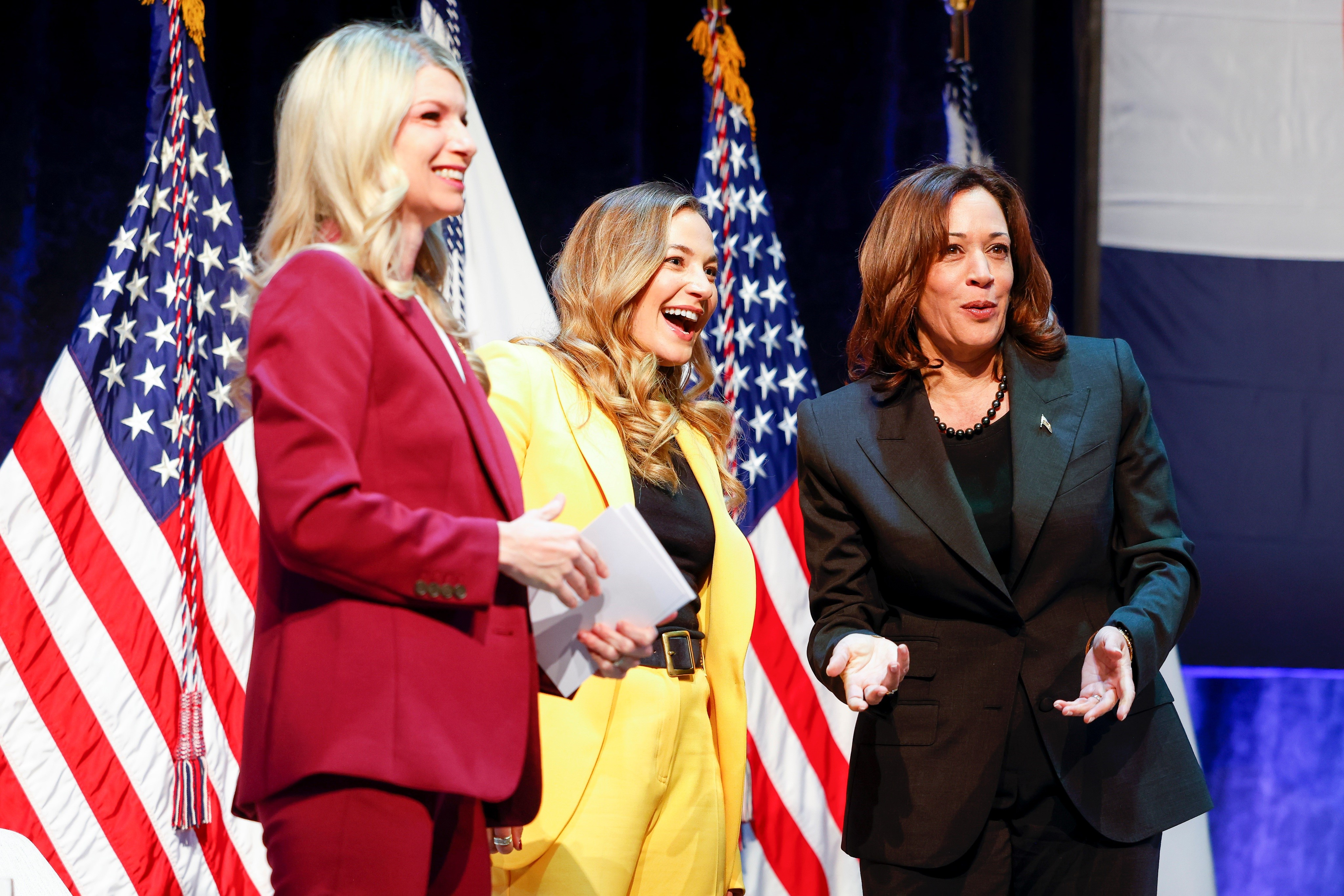
Pettersen (left) with rock climber Sasha DiGiulian (center) and United States Vice President Kamala Harris in March 2023.

=== Elections ===
==== 2018 ====
On April 9, 2017, following Ed Perlmutter's announcement that he was running for governor of Colorado, Pettersen announced her candidacy for Colorado's 7th congressional district. After Perlmutter re-entered the congressional race, Pettersen ended her campaign. In 2018, Pettersen ran for and won Colorado Senate District 22.

==== 2022 ====
After Perlmutter announced that he would retire from the U.S. House after the 2022 session, Pettersen again declared her candidacy for the 7th district seat. She was elected in November over Republican Erik Aadland with over 56% of the vote.

==== 2024 ====
In 2024, Pettersen ran for reelection. She defeated Republican nominee Sergei Matveyuk with 55.3% of the vote in the general election, 1.1% less than in 2022.

==== 2026 ====
Pettersen is running for a third term against Republican nominee Tim Bennett. Both were unopposed in their June primaries.

=== Tenure ===
Three housing bills that Pettersen championed covering issues ranging, from reducing duplicative federal housing requirements to encouraging mortgage lending for members of the armed services and veterans, were included in the 21st Century ROAD to Housing Act. The bill became law in July 2026. Pettersen introduced a package of wildfire bills after the Aspen Acres Fire, and the legislation included a provision that allowed federal hazard mitigation grants to be made available without a disaster declaration from the President. In September 2026, she introduced legislation to reauthorize the Radiation Exposure Compensation Act and proposed extending eligibility to people that lived near the Rocky Flats Plant and the Cotter uranium mill.

On July 12, 2024, Pettersen called for Joe Biden to withdraw from the 2024 United States presidential election.

On November 10, 2026, Pettersen missed the House vote on the impeachment of Pete Hegseth as Secretary of Defense. Pettersen claimed that the voting window closed early before she had a chance to vote, though the vote was scheduled for 15 minutes and lasted 27 minutes.

==== Proxy voting debate ====
About a month after giving birth to her second son, Pettersen flew to Washington, D.C., to vote on a continuing resolution because she was not given the ability to vote by proxy. She is working with fellow U.S. Congresswoman Anna Paulina Luna to pass a measure in the House that would allow proxy voting for up to 12 weeks for congressional members who have given birth or whose spouse has given birth. Republicans added language to a procedural rule allowing for "vote pairing" to be revived, where a member on the opposite side of a debate agrees to vote on behalf of an absent colleague: Pettersen challenged this, saying it wasn't a "workable solution" and she said she would continue to press to change the rules. She brought the proposal up again at a 2026 House Rules Committee meeting on the rules for the next Congress, and the committee's ranking member Jim McGovern said that Democrats would include it in the rules package if they won the House in the midterms.

=== Committee assignments ===
For the 119th Congress:

- Committee on Financial Services
  - Subcommittee on Digital Assets, Financial Technology, and Artificial Intelligence
  - Subcommittee on Housing and Insurance

=== Caucus memberships ===
- Future Forum (Co-chair)
- Congressional Equality Caucus
- Congressional YIMBY Caucus
- New Democrat Coalition
- Problem Solvers Caucus

== Electoral history ==
Electoral history of Brittany Pettersen
| Year | Office | | Party | Primary | | | General | | | Result | Swing | Ref. |
| Year | Office | | Party | Total | % | P. | Total | % | P. | Result | Swing | Ref. |
|---|---|---|---|---|---|---|---|---|---|---|---|---|
| 2012 | State House | 28th | Democratic | 2,985 | 100.0% | 1st | 19,603 | 52.71% | 1st | Won | Hold | |
| 2014 | State House | 28th | Democratic | 3,042 | 100.0% | 1st | 16,356 | 54.98% | 1st | Won | Hold | |
| 2016 | State House | 28th | Democratic | 3,781 | 100.0% | 1st | 22,431 | 55.58% | 1st | Won | Hold | |
| 2018 | State Senate | 22nd | Democratic | 16,066 | 100.0% | 1st | 42,747 | 58.16% | 1st | Won | Hold | |
| 2022 | U.S. House | 7th | Democratic | 71,497 | 100.0% | 1st | 204,984 | 56.38% | 1st | Won | Hold | |
| 2024 | U.S. House | 7th | Democratic | 71,052 | 100.0% | 1st | 235,688 | 55.33% | 1st | Won | Hold | |
| 2026 | U.S. House | 7th | Democratic | 113,707 | 100.0% | 1st | TBD | | | | | |
Source: Secretary of State of Colorado | Election Results

== Personal life ==
In 2017, Pettersen married Ian Silverii, the executive director of ProgressNow Colorado, at the Colorado Governor's Mansion. Pettersen and Silverii have two children.

U.S. House of Representatives
| Preceded by Ed Perlmutter | Member of the U.S. House of Representatives from Colorado's 7th congressional district 2023–present | Incumbent |
U.S. order of precedence (ceremonial)
| Preceded by Andy Ogles | United States representatives by seniority 343rd | Succeeded by Delia Ramirez |
