= NIMBY =

Opposition to nearby development projects

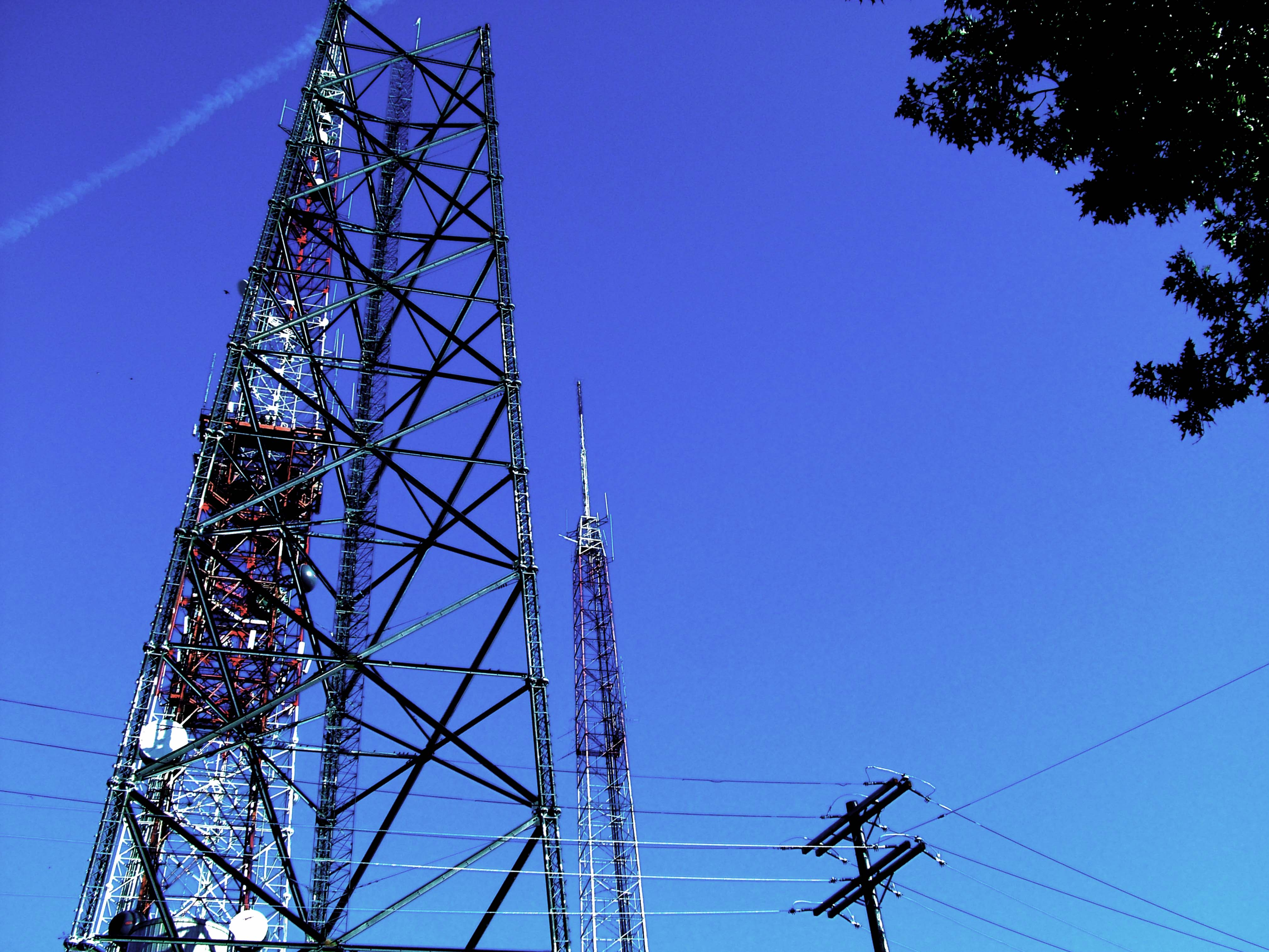
Unfinished tower in Tenleytown, Washington, D.C. that was later removed as a result of complaints from the neighborhood

Not in my back yard, or NIMBY (/ˈnɪmbi/) for short, is a common phrase describing the opposition by residents to proposed real estate and infrastructure developments in their local area, as well as support for strict land use regulations. It carries the connotation that such residents are only opposing the development because it is close to them and that they would tolerate or support it if it were built farther away. The residents are often called nimbys, and their viewpoint is called nimbyism.

The opposite, reactionary movement is known as YIMBY ("yes in my back yard").

Some examples of projects that have been opposed by nimbys include housing development (especially for affordable housing or trailer parks), high-speed rail lines, homeless shelters, day cares, schools, universities and colleges, music venues, bike lanes and transportation planning that promotes pedestrian safety infrastructure, solar farms, wind farms, incinerators, sewage treatment systems, fracking, and nuclear waste repositories.

== Rationale ==
Developments likely to attract local objections include:

- Infrastructure development, such as new roads and rest areas, railway, light rail and metro lines, airports, power plants, retail developments, sales of public assets, electrical transmission lines, wastewater treatment plants, landfills, sewage outfalls and prisons;
- Waste facility development, e.g. exploration of disposal sites for nuclear/radiation waste;
- The extraction of mineral resources including ore, aggregates and hydrocarbons from mines, quarries and oil wells or gas wells, respectively;
- Renewable energy generators, such as wind farms and solar panels;
- Businesses trading in goods perceived as immoral, such as adult video, liquor stores, and cannabis dispensaries;
- Accommodations perceived as primarily benefiting disadvantaged people, such as subsidized housing for the financially disadvantaged, supportive housing for the mentally ill, congregate living care homes (as for the developmentally disabled), halfway houses for drug addicts and criminals, and homeless shelters.
- Services catering to certain stigmatized groups (for example, injection drug users), such as methadone clinics, syringe exchange programmes, drug detoxification facilities, supervised injection site;
- Large-scale developments of all kinds, such as big-box stores and housing subdivisions.

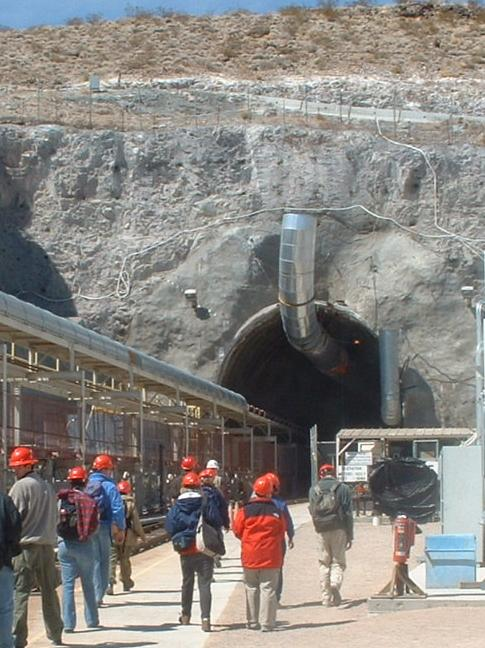
Proposed Yucca Mountain nuclear waste repository, 130 km (80 mi) northwest of Las Vegas, was approved by the government and then opposed by the citizens of Nevada. Federal funding ended in 2011.

The claimed reasons against these developments vary, and some are given below.

- Increased traffic: more jobs, more housing or more stores correlates to increased traffic on local streets and greater demand for parking spots. Industrial facilities such as warehouses, factories, or landfills often increase the volume of truck traffic.
- Harm to locally owned small businesses: the development of a big box store may provide too much competition to a locally owned store; similarly, the construction of a new road may make the older road less traveled, leading to a loss of business for property owners. This can lead to excessive relocation costs, or to loss of respected local businesses.
- Loss of residential property value: homes near an undesirable development may be less desirable for potential buyers. The lost revenue from property taxes may, or may not, be offset by increased revenue from the project.
- Environmental pollution of land, air, and water: power plants, factories, chemical facilities, crematoriums, sewage treatment facilities, airports, and similar projects may—or may be claimed to—contaminate the land, air, or water around them. Especially facilities assumed to smell might cause objections.
- Light pollution: projects that operate at night, or that include security lighting (such as street lights in a parking lot), may be accused of causing light pollution.
- Noise pollution: in addition to the noise of traffic, a project may inherently be noisy. This is a common objection to wind power, airports, roads, and many industrial facilities, but also stadiums, festivals, and nightclubs which are particularly noisy at night when locals want to sleep.
- Visual blight and failure to "blend in" with the surrounding architecture: the proposed project might be ugly or particularly large, or cast a shadow over an area due to its height.
- Loss of a community's small-town feel: proposals that might result in new people moving into the community, such as a plan to build many new houses, are often claimed to change the community's character.
- Strain of public resources and schools: this reason is given for any increase in the local area's population, as additional school facilities might be needed for the additional children, but particularly to projects that might result in certain kinds of people joining the community, such as a group home for people with disabilities, or immigrants.
- Disproportionate benefit to non-locals: the project appears to benefit non-local people, such as non-citizen investors or job creation (in the case of commercial projects like factories or big-box stores) or harm people from neighboring areas (in the case of regional government projects, such as airports, highways, sewage treatment, or landfills).
- Increases in crime: this is usually applied to projects that are perceived as attracting or employing low-skill workers or racial minorities, as well as projects that cater to people who are thought to often commit crimes, such as the mentally ill, the poor, and drug addicts. Additionally, certain types of projects, such as pubs or medical marijuana dispensaries, might be perceived as directly increasing the amount of crime in the area.
- Risk of an (environmental) disaster, such as with drilling operations, chemical industry, dams, or nuclear power plants.
- Historic districts: the affected area is on a heritage register, because of its many older properties that are being preserved as such.
- The cause of NIMBYism is seen by some due to spatially concentrated costs and diffuse benefits together with regulatory transaction costs which result in a failure of conflict resolution.

As hinted by the list, protests can occur for opposite reasons. A new road or shopping center can cause increased traffic and work opportunities for some, and decreased traffic for others, harming local businesses.

People in an area affected by plans sometimes form an organization which can collect money and organize the objection activities. NIMBYists can hire a lawyer to file formal appeals, and contact media to gain public support for their case.

== Origin and history ==
The acronym first appeared in a February 1979 newspaper article in Virginia's Daily Press.

agencies need to be better coordinated and the "nimby" (not in my backyard) syndrome must be eliminated.

The article may have been quoting Joseph A. Lieberman, a member of the United States Atomic Energy Commission. The phrase '"not in my back yard" syndrome,' without the acronym, also appeared in an environmental journal in February 1980. The Oxford English Dictionary's earliest citation is a Christian Science Monitor article from November 1980, although even there the author indicates the term is already used in the hazardous waste industry. The concept behind the term, that of locally organized resistance to unwanted land uses, is likely to have originated earlier. One suggestion is it emerged in the 1950s.

In the 1980s, the term was popularized by British politician Nicholas Ridley, who was the Conservative Secretary of State for the Environment. Comedian George Carlin used the term in 1992 for his Jammin' in New York special, implying that people had already heard of it.

The NIMBY acronym has also been used by social scientists since the early 1980s to describe the resistance of communities to the siting of controversial facilities and land use.

The term's connotation has harshened since its introduction in the 1980s. Beyond their impact on any single development or neighborhood, NIMBY organizations and policies are now painted as worsening racial segregation, deepening economic inequality, and limiting the overall supply of affordable housing. There have been a variety of books and articles on how to address NIMBY perspectives. One such article discussing NIMBY opposition to affordable housing by the National Low Income Housing Coalition.

== Variations ==
NIMBY and its derivative terms nimbyism, nimbys, and nimbyists, refer implicitly to debates of development generally or to a specific case. As such, their use is inherently contentious. The term is usually applied to opponents of a development, implying that they have narrow, selfish, or myopic views. Its use is often pejorative.

=== Not in my neighborhood ===
The term Not in my neighborhood, or NIMN, is also frequently used. "NIMN" additionally refers to legislative actions or private agreements made with the sole purpose of maintaining racial identity within a particular neighborhood or residential area by forcefully keeping members of other races from moving into the area. In that regard, "Not in My Neighborhood," by author and journalist Antero Pietila, describes the toll NIMN politics had on housing conditions in Baltimore throughout the 20th century and the systemic, racially based citywide separation it caused.

=== BANANA and CAVE ===
BANANA is an acronym for "build absolutely nothing anywhere near anything" (or "anyone"). The term is most often used to criticize the ongoing opposition of certain advocacy groups to land development. The term is commonly used within the context of planning in the United Kingdom. Sunderland City Council lists the term in their online dictionary of jargon.

In the United States, the related phenomenon CAVE people or "CAVE dwellers" serves as an acronym for "citizens against virtually everything." It is a pejorative term for citizens who regularly oppose any changes in their community, organization or workplace. A reference to the term "CAVE dwellers" can be found in the September 30, 1990, edition of the Orlando Sentinel. The term apparently existed before the publication of the article.

CAVE/BANANA people are characterized by implacable opposition to change in any form, regardless of what other local residents and stakeholders feel. This attitude is manifested in opposition to changes in public policy as varied as tax levies, sewer rates, public transportation routes, parking regulations and municipal mergers or annexations. CAVE/BANANA people often express their views publicly by attending community meetings, writing letters to the local newspaper, or calling in to talk radio shows, similar to NIMBYs.

The terms "CAVE people" and "BANANAs" were used in a 2022 op-ed to describe the populace of Stamford, Connecticut. The op-ed was written by a former municipal employee and described CAVE people as seeing "no issue simultaneously arguing conflicting points so long as nothing changes."

Similar is "NIABY" or "not in anyone's backyard".

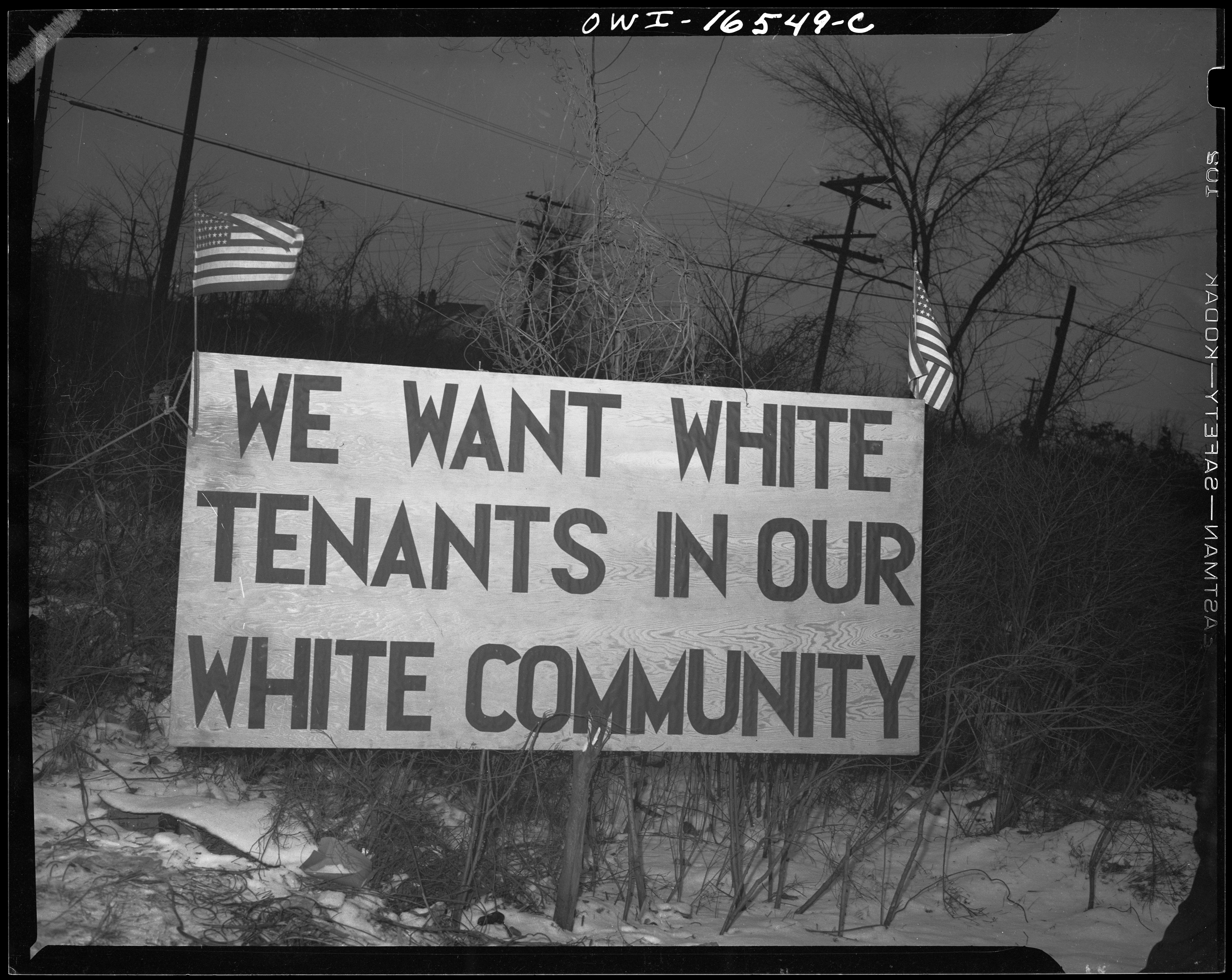
A sign in Detroit in 1942, opposing the plan for the nearby Sojourner Truth Project, a public housing project that was predicted to have Black residents; the plan partially led to the 1943 Detroit race riot. Photograph by Arthur Siegel.

=== PIBBY ===
PIBBY is an acronym for "place in Blacks' back yard." This principle indicates that the people with perceived social, racial, and economic privileges object to a development in their own back yards, and if the objectionable item must be built, then it should be built so that its perceived harms disproportionately affect poor, socially disadvantaged people. Economically disadvantaged people might not be willing or able to hire a lawyer to appeal the right way, or might have more immediate troubles than a new nearby construction project. The environmental justice movement has pointed out nimbyism leads to environmental racism. Robert D. Bullard, Director of the Environmental Justice Resource Center at Clark Atlanta University, has argued that official responses to NIMBY phenomena have led to the PIBBY principle.

=== Reverse NIMBY ===
Reverse NIMBY is a phenomenon opposite to the widely known concept of NIMBY. Instead of arguing that it is troublesome that a hazardous facility is located in my backyard, proponents and people who exploit the concept of reverse NIMBY would say that "If it happens in my backyard, it matters more because, well, it's my backyard." It appears within the U.S. Congress where politicians actively use the mentality after major catastrophic events to garner recovery funds from the federal government. This is a viable strategy for members of Congress to garner benefits for their constituents because it is difficult for the federal government to understand needs at the local level.

== Points of debate ==
Although often used rather pejoratively, the use of the concept NIMBY and similar terms have been challenged by those who have been called NIMBYs. The term is frequently used to dismiss advocates as selfish or ill-informed, whereas they claim to be defending overlooked community values.

=== In favor of development ===
YIMBY, an acronym for "yes, in my back yard", is a pro-development movement in contrast and opposition to the NIMBY phenomenon.

Frequently argued debate points in favor of development include higher employment, tax revenue, marginal cost of remote development, safety, and environmental benefits. Proponents of development may accuse locals of egotism, elitism, parochialism, drawbridge mentality, racism and anti-diversity, the inevitability of criticism, and misguided or unrealistic claims of prevention of urban sprawl. If people who do not want to be disturbed see the general need of an establishment, such as an airport, they generally suggest another location. But seen from society's perspective, the other location might not be better, since people living there get disturbed instead. Strict land use regulations are an important driver of racial housing segregation in the United States. White communities are more likely to have strict land use regulations (and white people are more likely to support those regulations).

=== In favor of local sovereignty ===
Those labeled as NIMBYs may have a variety of motivations and may be unified only because they oppose a particular project. For example, some may oppose any significant change or development, regardless of type, purpose, or origin. Others, if the project is seen as being imposed by outsiders, may hold strong principles of self-governance, local sovereignty, local autonomy, and home rule. These people believe that local people should have the final choice, and that any project affecting the local people should clearly benefit themselves, rather than corporations with distant investors or central governments. Still others may object to a particular project because of its nature, e.g., opposing a nuclear power plant over fear of radiation, or opposing a local apartment complex due to worries about overcrowding or crime, but accepting a local waste management facility as a municipal necessity.

== Effects ==
=== Housing prices ===
Increase of demand curve towards higher demand increases both the equilibrium price and quantity

Shift of supply curve towards higher supply reduces equilibrium price and increases equilibrium quantity

Studies show that stricter land use regulation, such as the kind that arises from NIMBY advocacy, raises the price of housing, and consequently increases cost of living. Housing prices are affected by demand and supply of housing. The effect of moving chains is shown for change of housing prices.

=== Social effects ===
Homelessness is connected to lower housing supply and higher rents. Strict land use regulations contribute to racial housing segregation in the United States.

=== Economy ===
A study by economists Chang-Tai Hsieh and Enrico Moretti estimated that the housing restrictions brought on by NIMBY activists are costing US workers $1 trillion in reduced wages (several thousand dollars per worker) by making it unaffordable to relocate to higher-productivity cities.

=== Opposition by type of use ===
A 1994 paper by Michael Gerrard found that NIMBY movements generally oppose three types of facilities: waste disposal, low-income housing, and social services (such as homeless shelters). While opposition to waste disposal may have community benefits by encouraging recycling, it has also perpetuated the existence of those facilities in minority communities, while opposition to low-income housing and social services facilities has significant negative effects for society at large.

== Examples ==
=== Australia ===
Housing projects have been delayed, cut back and halted due to local opposition in every major Australian city.

Housing in Australia’s major cities is among the least affordable in the world.As of 2025, Sydney was the second most unaffordable housing market in the world, behind Hong Kong. Paul Scully said in 2026 that 'Not In My Back Yard' has ruled for too long, and resulted in Sydney becoming the world's second most expensive housing market.

In the 1970s, Australia had the some of first Green Bans. Many bans were to oppose the destruction of housing for urban expressways, however others were to oppose prevent the redevelopment of housing.

Sydney's Eastern Suburbs are known for their strong opposition to new development. The NSW Government abandoned the partially-built Woollahra railway station after overwhelming disapproval from local residents, who lobbied state politicians to stop the project.

An Australian politician, Zali Steggall, representing Sydney Manly Beach, advocates action on climate change, including the installation of wind turbines. Suspecting that other politicians would propose the installation wind turbines, Not In My Backyard, a tongue-in-cheek, online petition was set up to assess support for the establishment of wind farms on the Manly Beach.

The Teal independents movement in New South Wales has been suggested as "all about overdevelopment". Candidates have pushed back on this label and stated their residents are not NIMBYs.

=== Canada ===
==== British Columbia ====
In Vancouver, the city hall's licensing department rejected a day care's expansion from 8 to 16 kids after a small number of neighbors attended public meetings in 2023 to discuss the parking issues, noise, and traffic the additional children would bring to the neighborhood. According to city projections, Vancouver has a shortfall of 14,911 licensed child-care spaces.

==== Nova Scotia ====
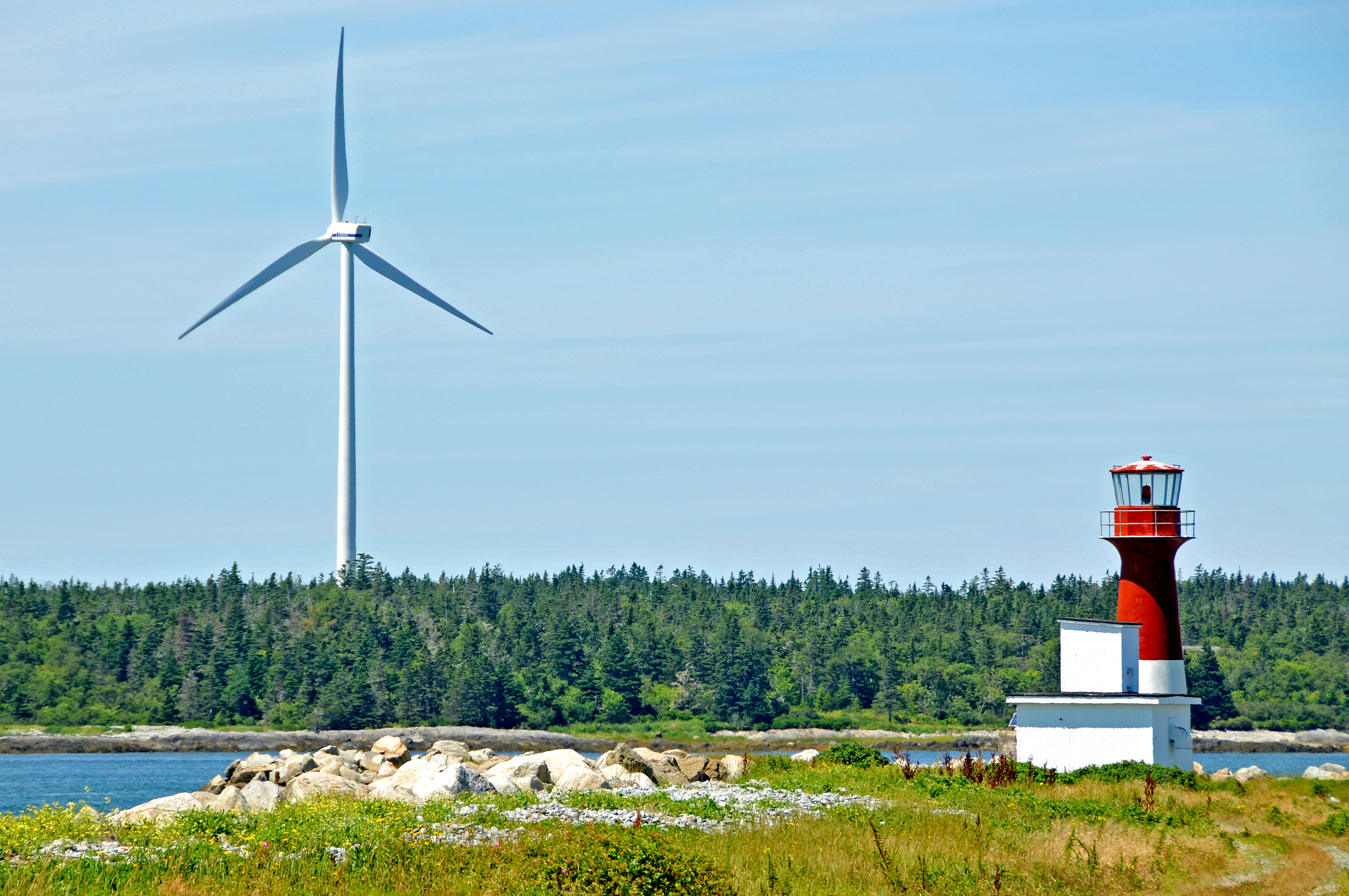
Wind generator in Nova Scotia

In July 2012, residents of Kings County rallied against a bylaw, developed over three years of consultation and hearings, allowing wind generators to be constructed nearby. A similar theme arose in September 2009, where residents there rallied against a wind generator in Digby Neck. In January 2011, residents of Lawrencetown in Halifax County openly opposed a cellular telephone tower being built. A proposed development of downtown Dartmouth in August 2012 was also contested by residents. In February 2013, some residents of Lunenburg County opposed wind farms being built in the area, saying, "It's health and it's property devaluation" and "This is an industrial facility put in the middle of rural Nova Scotia. It does not belong there."

In March 2013, some residents of the community of Blockhouse opposed the building and development of a recycling plant, referred to by one business owner as a "dump." The plant would offer 75 jobs to the community of roughly 5,900 people. In the same month, the municipal councilors of Chester approved the building of wind turbines in the area in a 6–1 vote, despite some local opposition.

==== Quebec ====
REM de l'Est, a proposed extension of Montreal's rapid transit network, was abandoned in 2022 due to concerns of the local residents related to possible noise from the trains.

=== China ===
There have been successful NIMBY movements in China over the last few decades. In May 2014, in the city of Yuhang in Zhejiang Province, a NIMBY movement prevented the construction of a giant refuse incinerator. The victory came at enormous costs with many grassroot leaders arrested and many government infrastructures destroyed. However, in the case of China, many socially harmful projects simply continue their operation or relocate once media attention subsides and government authorities start to suppress the protestors.

The Chinese government has also been accused of "weaponizing" NIMBY movements abroad through influence operations that drive opposition against perceived economic threats such as the development projects that compete with the rare earth industry in China.

=== Ireland ===
In 2020, there was significant opposition to the development of 650 apartments in the grounds of St Paul's College school in the Dublin suburb of Raheny. 650 individual objections were received against the planning submission as well as several protests held.

Court challenges were taken by residents groups against the permission which was granted on the basis of not adequately addressing the EU habitats directive. Following a revised submission with a report on the effects to light-bellied Brent geese and other protected birds, the development was finally granted permission in August 2020.

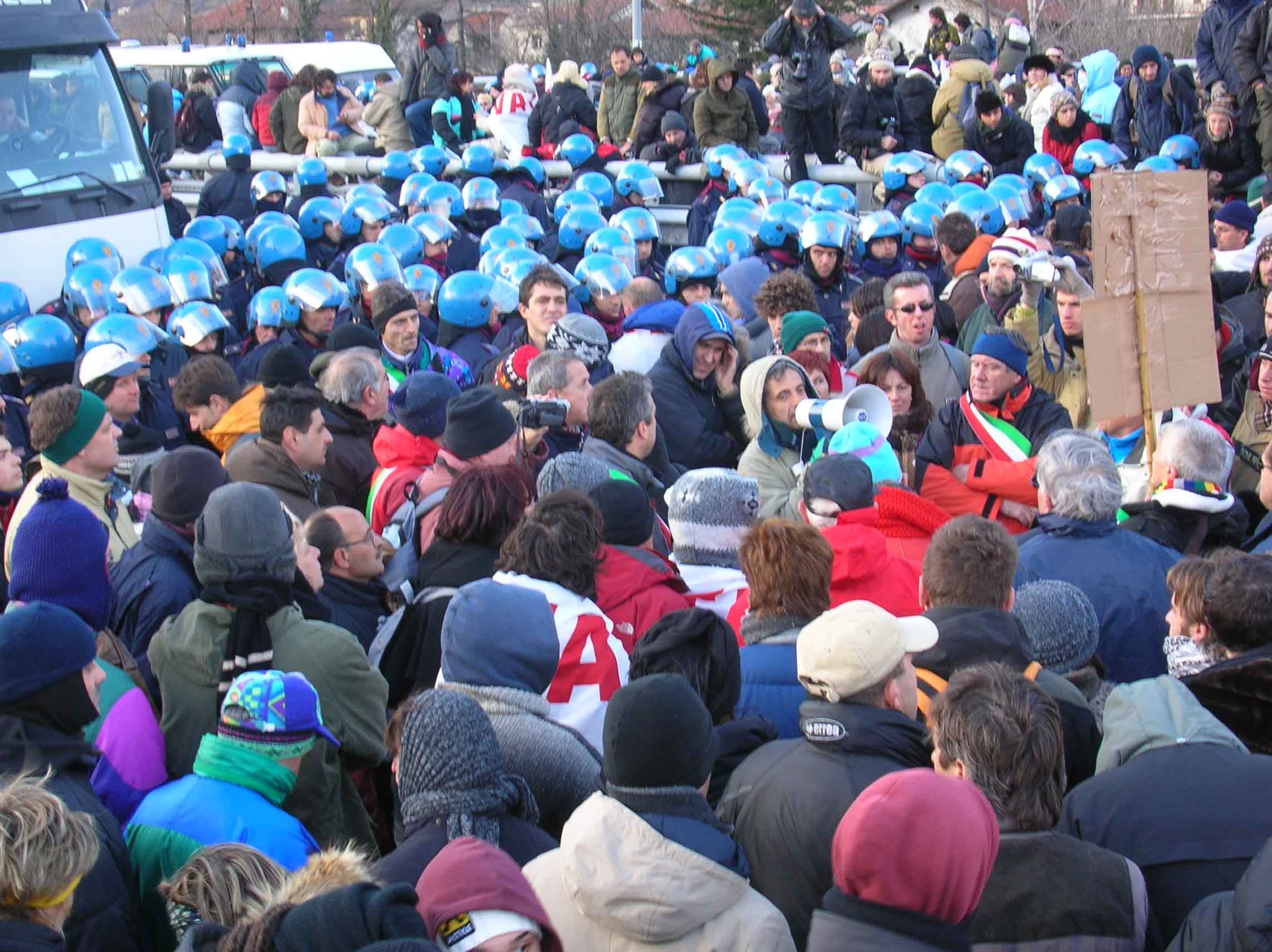
No TAV protest in 2005

=== Italy ===
The No TAV opposition to the Turin–Lyon high-speed railway is often characterized as a NIMBY movement.

=== Japan ===
==== Narita Airport ====
Starting in 1966, the Sanrizuka Struggle movement opposed the construction of Narita International Airport. Originally the plan for the airport also included a high speed railway line that was later scrapped. NIMBYs also prevented extension of the airport's short second runway (unusable for anything but short-haul narrow-body aircraft) until the late 2000s, when cross-town Haneda Airport was opened to international traffic, as additional runways on landfill were completed at an extra cost of billions of dollars; the second runway was extended to 2,500 metres (8,200 ft).

==== Odakyu Double Tracking ====
Odakyu Electric Railway, now providing transit along a corridor with 5 million people living in walking distance of its rail and feeder bus service area, was originally built in the pre-war era, and as the city of Tokyo's population ballooned, rail demand in suburbs exploded. By the 1960s, oshiya pushers were required to squash people into packed trains, and Odakyu Railway sought to expand its two-track lines to four, thus allowing more passing trains and faster run times as well as less crowding and congestive wait and hold of trains. NIMBY residents living near the line in the Setagaya ward fought attempts by the railway to acquire land; Odakyu attempted to buy each piece of land individually, offering high prices. The Setagaya Residents' opposition established a long-term and remarkable NIMBY case in the courts and legislature. By 1993, after three decades of trying, it was apparent this plan was failing, and the company decided to go for a multi-billion dollar solution: tunneling two lines underground, and then adding back two new lines stacked on top, to make four tracks in each direction for 12 stations and 10.4 km, instead of acquiring the land. The company's decision began in 1993 and completed in 2004 for one critical section, meanwhile, for the second smaller section, this same decision was made in 2003 with project completion finally approaching fruition in March 2018, nearly six decades later.

=== United Kingdom ===
==== Oxford Memorial ====
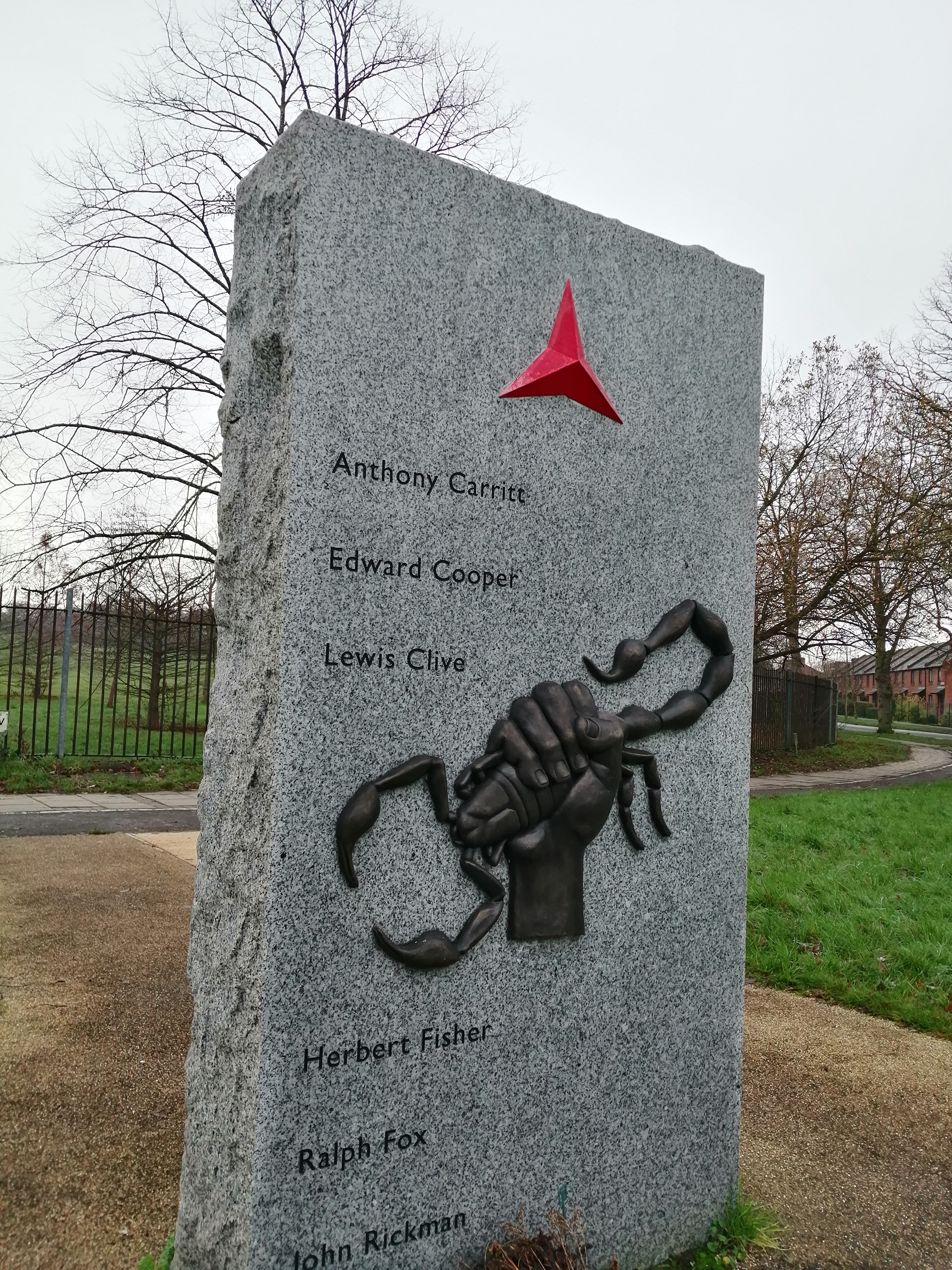
The Oxford Spanish Civil War memorial, erected near South Park after all planning permissions for an anti-fascist memorial in Oxford city centre were rejected

The Oxford Spanish Civil War memorial, built in 2017, is dedicated to locals who served the International Brigades against Spanish nationalist forces backed by Hitler and Mussolini. The memorial sits outside the city centre because all planning proposals to erect the memorial in the centre were rejected for numerous reasons, with Liberal Democrat councillors opposing all the suggested locations. The creation of the monument was also opposed by the Oxford Preservation Trust and the London Place Residents' Association. The current placement of the memorial was the third proposed location, with the previous two having their planning applications rejected by Oxford City Council. The first proposed spot was Bonn Square which was rejected citing that granite was not a stone native to Oxford. The second proposed location was St Giles' which was also rejected by councillors, claiming that the close proximity of an anti-fascist memorial to current war memorials would insult the memory of people who died during the Second World War. Some objected to the memorial because it did not honour "both sides ... in a spirit of reconciliation and forgiveness", and called the design "aggressive towards the memory of the victims of conflict".

Liberal Democrat councillor Elizabeth Wade opposed each proposed location for a monument in Oxford, although she claimed she was never opposed in principle. She described the second proposal on St Giles' near Oxford's First and Second World War memorials as "aggressive and triumphalist". Describing herself as a historian and speaking to the Oxford Mail, she then opposed the third and current location because she believed a monument with a red flag would glorify communism, despite no red flag ever being proposed to appear on the monument. Her rejection of every proposal led to Britain's largest and longest running left-wing newspaper, the Morning Star, labelling her as a NIMBY.

==== Ashtead, Surrey ====
In 2007, residents of the affluent English village of Ashtead, Surrey, which lies on the outskirts of London, objected to the conversion of a large, £1.7 million residential property into a family support centre for relatives of wounded British service personnel. The house was to be purchased by a registered charity, SSAFA Forces Help. Local residents objected to the proposal out of fear of increased traffic and noise, as well as the possibility of an increased threat of terrorism. They also contended that the SSAFA charity is actually a business, thereby setting an unwelcome precedent. British newspapers ran articles titled "No heroes in my backyard".

Ex-servicemen and several members of the British general public organised a petition in support of SSAFA, and even auctioned the "Self Respect of Ashtead" on eBay.

==== High Speed 2 ====
Particularly in the time period preceding the final decision on the route of the high-speed railway known as High Speed 2, BBC News Online reported that many residents of Conservative constituencies were launching objections to the HS2 route based on the effects it would have on them, whilst also showing concerns that HS2 is unlikely to have a societal benefit at a macro level under the current economic circumstances. Likewise, Labour MP Natascha Engel—through whose constituency the line will pass—offered a "passionate defence of nimbyism" in the House of Commons, with regards to the effects the line would have on home- and business-owning constituents. HS2 has also been opposed by residents of the Chilterns and Camden who argue that there is an insufficient business case for the line. On 17 March 2014, it was announced that Camden residents were successful in their campaign to prevent the construction of the HS1–HS2 link railway.

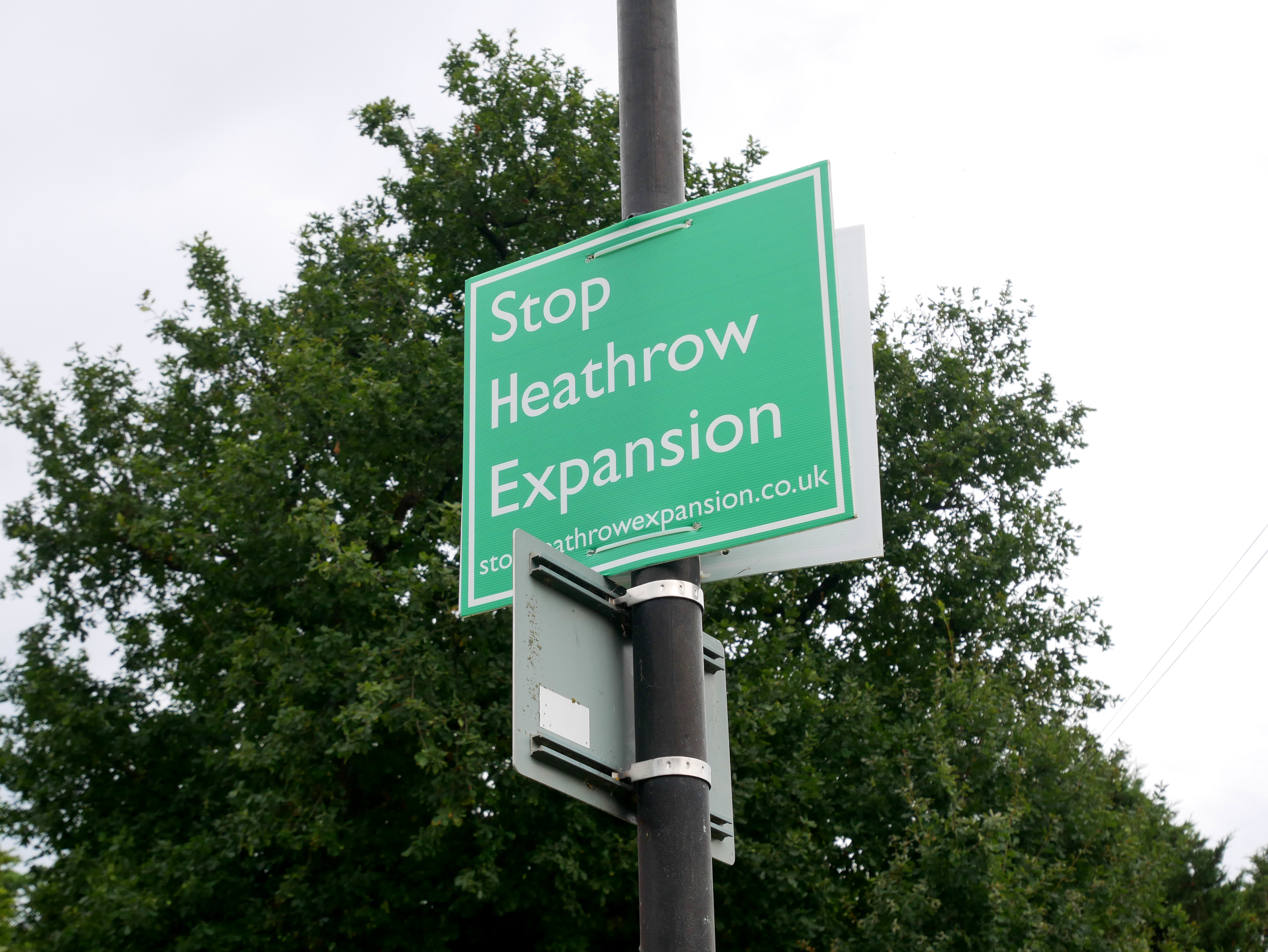
A placard in Harmondsworth, England, in 2024, protesting the proposed expansion of nearby Heathrow Airport, which would partially demolish the village

==== Heathrow Airport ====
In November 2007, a consultation process began for the building of a new third runway and a sixth terminal and it was controversially approved on 15 January 2009 by UK government ministers. The project was then cancelled on 12 May 2010 by the Cameron Government. The project was adopted by the House of Commons in June 2018. NIMBYs and political protestors appealed to the courts, but lost in the UK Supreme Court in December 2020.

==== Coventry Airport ====
Coventry Airport is owned by CAFCO (Coventry) Limited, a joint venture between Howard Holdings plc and Convergence-AFCO Holdings Limited (CAFCOHL). In June 2007, it had its application to build permanent terminal and passenger facilities rejected by the UK government due to public pressure.

==== Wimbledon, London ====
The London Borough of Merton did not have enough school places for local children who would be reaching school age in 2012 and 2013. Almost all local schools had expanded, but the group "Save Our Rec" (recreation ground) (dedicated in the preservation of green areas in the local community) opposed the expansion of Dundonald School as their interest was focused on protecting one of the few green spaces left in the Borough of Merton. Those that disagreed with the "Save our Rec" group labelled the group NIMBYs. Despite efforts to protect green spaces, the expansion proceeded onto a portion of the park and the park's pavilion.

==== Portland Migrant Barge ====
In April 2023, the UK Government announced a plan to use the engineless barge, the Bibby Stockholm, to house around 500 asylum seekers in Portland Harbour, in an attempt to save money housing asylum seekers. Whilst most of the controversy outside of the town of Portland stemmed from its apparent overcrowding, ethical issues, and economic inefficiency, many protests from the inside of the town were because of impacts on the town's tourism industry, and a possible increase in crime and anti-social behaviour, with some saying it puts the women of the town at risk. They were dubbed as NIMBYs by some facets of the media.

=== United States ===
Research shows that conservatives and liberals are equally likely to oppose new housing developments in their localities. White neighborhoods and cities tend to favor more restrictive housing development policy. A study in Perspectives on Politics found that "individuals who are older, male, longtime residents, voters in local elections, and homeowners are significantly more likely to participate" in local government, and that "these individuals overwhelmingly (and to a much greater degree than the general public) oppose new housing construction." Nimbys tend to be homeowners, and have been described as acting to keep home prices high in self-interest and as working against their financial interests. Some economists believe that this is due to a public misunderstanding of how the new construction of housing affects housing prices. For example, only 30-40% of Americans believe that new housing construction reduces housing prices, and meanwhile a comparable amount of Americans believe that new construction increases housing prices.

According to a 2017 report from the National Low Income Housing Coalition, there is a shortage of 7.4 million affordable homes available for rent to extremely low income (ELI) households in the United States. As a result, seventy-one percent of ELI households are forced to spend over half of their income on housing costs, leading to severe financial burdens. Despite this apparent need for more affordable housing, opposition from NIMBY activists presents significant challenges to affordable housing developments, resulting in costly design changes, construction delays, and permit denials. However, research suggests that proactive outreach and communication by affordable housing developers and proponents through the leveraging of social marketing and positive messaging can overcome common NIMBY barriers.

==== California ====
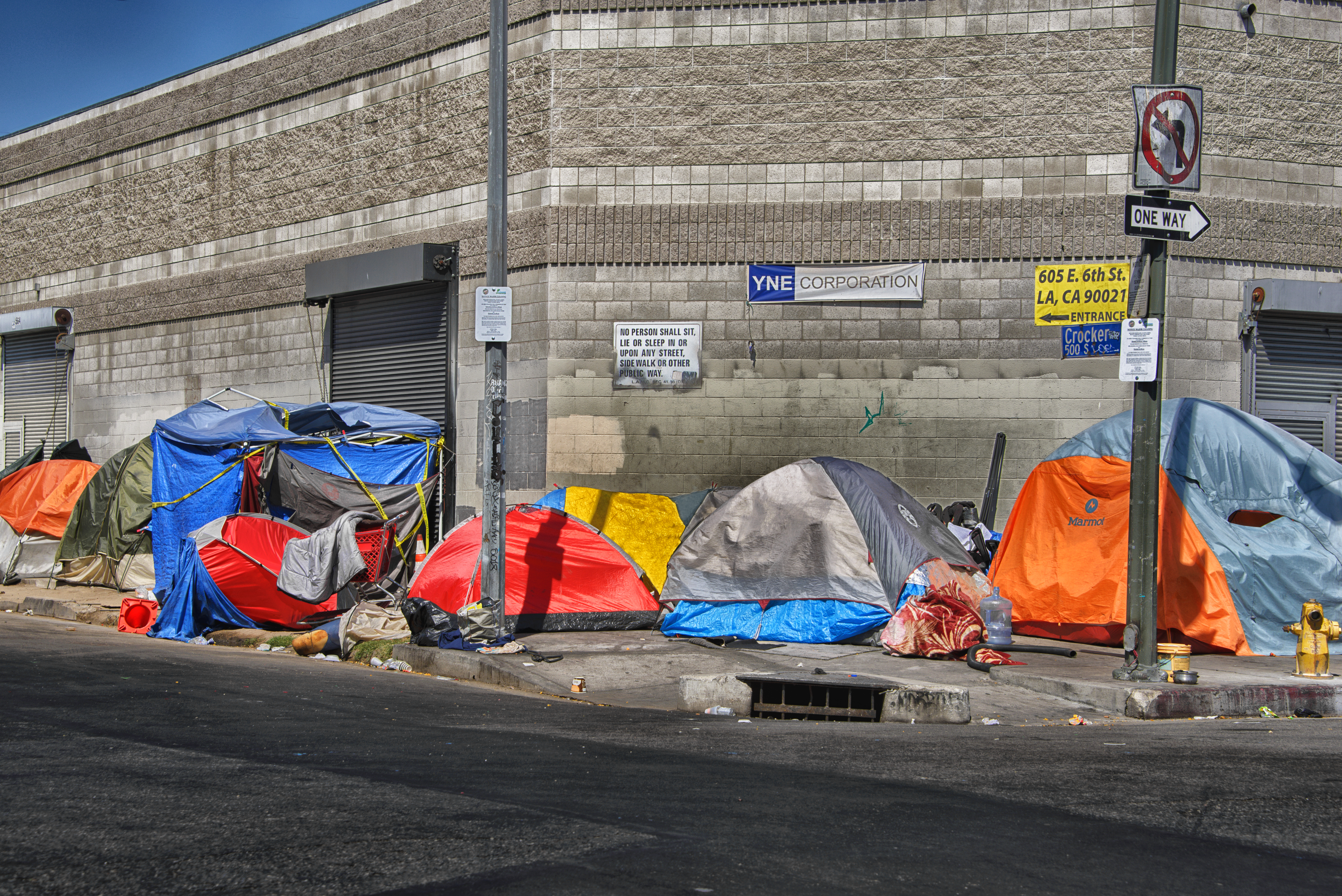
Tents of homeless people in Skid Row, Los Angeles, 2018

Activism from both individuals and organizations opposed to new housing construction has been cited as a major reason for the state's ongoing housing shortage and high cost of living.

Many local residents (including farmers) in Hanford, California and surrounding areas are opposed to the California High-Speed Rail Authority building high-speed rail near farmland, citing that it will bring environmental and economic problems.

Wealthy residents of southern Orange County, California defeated a local measure that proposed to convert the decommissioned El Toro Marine Base into a commercial airport, claiming that the airport would be "unsafe" during landings and takeoffs, as well as create air quality issues. The real issue was the FAA planned the flight paths for the airport over expensive neighborhoods of south Orange County and residents feared that their property values would decrease. The airport proposal, however, was strongly supported by northern Orange County residents. The defeat of the local measure resulted in the creation of the Orange County Great Park.

For over 60 years, environmentalists, historic preservationists and long-time residents of South Pasadena, California have been opposing the completion of the highly controversial State Route 710 through the cities of Los Angeles (El Sereno), South Pasadena and Pasadena. In 1973, a federal injunction was granted, halting the construction of the surface freeway pending an environmental impact analysis. The Federal Highway Administration withdrew support for the surface freeway in 2003.

On 29 September 2017, 15 housing bills were signed into law by Governor Jerry Brown to combat the state's housing shortage. Many of these bills are considered direct attempts to reduce the ability of private citizens to suppress housing construction, even being referred to by some as "Anti-NIMBY" bills.

In 2022, California governor Gavin Newsom declared that "nimbyism is destroying the state" and promised to hold cities and counties accountable for stopping new housing development. In June 2025, Newsom signed SB 131 into law which contains many provisions to speed up the approval process for building infrastructure, including a streamlining of the California Environmental Quality Act and changes to the California Coastal Commission, which have been used for decades to block the development of dense housing developments and transit. On October 10, 2025, Governor Newsom signed the Abundant and Affordable Homes Near Transit Act (also known as SB 79) that overrides local zoning requirements within half a mile of train and certain types of rapid bus line stations. This was signed with more support from local and state level officeholders from the Bay Area than from Los Angeles whose city council had passed a ceremonial motion against it that August.

===== San Francisco =====
Nimbyism in San Francisco, including several members of the San Francisco Board of Supervisors, has led to a suppression of new housing construction, transit expansion, bike infrastructure, and new retail stores in the city. Nimbys have cited negative impact on local communities, low affordable housing quotas, restrictions on buildings' shadows, increased car traffic, and concerns with parking as reasons for opposing projects. Those who favor housing developments argue that new housing construction makes housing more affordable, thereby reducing displacement, personal property tax burdens, and homelessness. Examples of nimbyism in San Francisco include 8 Washington housing project, 1846 Grove Street housing, 1060 Folsom housing, 1979 Mission housing, 2675 Folsom housing, 250 Laguna Honda Boulevard housing, 770 Woolsey, UCSF Parnassus Heights hospital expansion, and the Polk Street bike lane.

San Francisco nimbys have also been described as "housing conservatives".

===== Marin County =====
Many residents of Marin County, an affluent bedroom community in the San Francisco Bay Area, have for many years exemplified the idea of nimbyism through their ardent resistance to housing developments and housing quotas. Residents believe housing developments will lead to increased population density which can lead to increased traffic, increased pollution, crowded schools, a lack of open space, and a poor quality of life.

In 2018, some Marin residents started the NIMBY group Livable California.

==== Florida ====
A minority of residents in St. Lucie County, Florida have vehemently opposed the construction of wind turbines in the county. The construction of the wind turbines was strongly supported by over 80% of county residents according to a 2008 Florida Power and Light (FPL) poll. Additionally, the power company proposed building the turbines in a location on a beach near a prior existing nuclear power plant owned by the company.

In the 1980s, plans were made to develop a series of east/west highways to connect Palm Beach County's suburbs with downtown West Palm Beach. Many residents in the area opposed the plan, largely due to the highway expansion requiring the demolition of over 100 homes. Ultimately, the plan was revised to transform the existing SR-80 (Southern Boulevard) into a full expressway to minimize disruptions to local residents and businesses, however all of the proposals were later abandoned.

==== Illinois ====
In 1959, when Deerfield officials learned that a developer building a neighborhood of large new homes planned to make houses available to African Americans, they issued a stop-work order. An intense debate began about racial integration, property values, and the good faith of the residents, community officials and builders. For a brief time, Deerfield was spotlighted in the national news as "the Little Rock of the North." Supporters of integration were denounced and ostracized by residents. Eventually, the village passed a referendum to build parks on the property, thus putting an end to the housing development. Two model homes already partially completed were sold to village officials. Otherwise, the land lay dormant for years before it was developed into what is now Mitchell Pool and Park and Jaycee Park. The first black family did not move into Deerfield until much later, and in years since Deerfield has seen a greater influx of minorities, including Jews, Asians, Greeks and others. This episode in Deerfield's history is described in But Not Next Door by Harry and David Rosen, both residents of Deerfield.

==== Minnesota ====
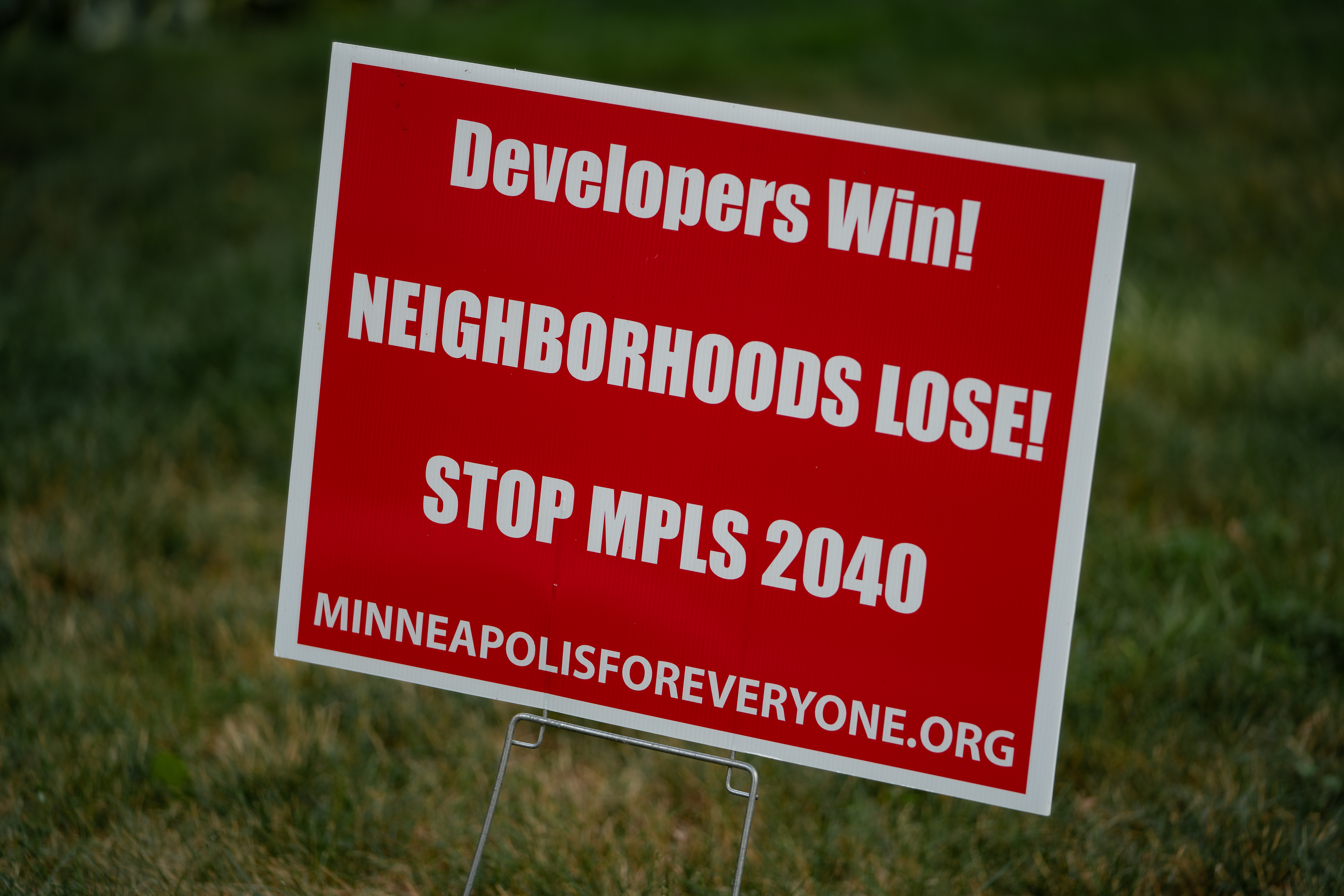
Minneapolis's plan to end single-family zoning faced years of legal challenges

In the late 1990s a proposal for commuter rail on the Dan Patch Corridor between Minneapolis and Northfield was studied. In 2002, due to opposition from neighborhoods along the corridor, two state representatives from the suburbs of Bloomington and Edina passed a legislative ban that prohibited further study, discussion, funding, and construction of the project. Several attempts have been made to lift the ban, and in 2023 it was finally lifted. As of 2023 the communities along the route have no official position on the Dan Patch Corridor except Lakeville, Minnesota, which is opposed.

In 2018, Minneapolis became the first US city to end single-family zoning, with a guiding framework called the "Minneapolis 2040 Comprehensive Plan". The plan faced years of legal challenges, and eventually required intervention from the state legislature to proceed.

==== New York ====
In 1858, a group of residents in Staten Island burned down the New York Marine Hospital, at the time the largest quarantine facility in the United States, citing its negative effect on local property values.

On Long Island, various electrification and expansion projects of the Long Island Rail Road (LIRR) were substantially delayed due to the protests of people living near the railroad. For example, the Metropolitan Transportation Authority built a third track on the Main Line from Floral Park station to Hicksville station in order to increase capacity. Although most communities along the route supported grade crossing eliminations as part of the project, there was fierce opposition for building a third track from the villages of Floral Park, New Hyde Park, and Garden City, which said the construction and the resulting increased train service will reduce the quality of life in their neighborhoods. The third track project was suspended indefinitely in 2008, but new funding for the project was included in a 2016 infrastructure improvement plan announced by New York Governor Andrew Cuomo, which included measures intended to mitigate locals' concerns. Despite the promise of mitigation efforts, several local politicians denounced the governor's plan within a day of its announcement. In December 2017, the LIRR awarded a contract to build the third track. It was completed in October 2022 and a new service pattern was ultimately implemented in February 2023, concurrent with the full opening of Grand Central Madison.

In Port Washington, New York, a dispute broke out between the town of North Hempstead and the LIRR over a proposed yard expansion at Port Washington station. To expand the yard, a parking lot belonging to the town would need to be reduced in size, but a local councilperson stated that the addition of the tracks "will completely ruin the character of the town." The LIRR was able to expand the yard without the agreement of North Hempstead by tearing up 140 parking spaces of its own parking lot, also adjacent to the station.

Community opposition also led to the cancellation of a proposed extension of the New York City Subway's Astoria Line (carrying the N and W trains) to LaGuardia Airport. Similarly, opposition has stopped any proposal to build a bridge or tunnel across the Long Island Sound with some believing it will harm their communities with an influx of unwanted traffic as well as concerns regarding the environment and the number of homes that would be cleared as a result.

==== Tennessee ====
In early 2020, in Campbell County, Tennessee, complaints occurred after an out-of-state company began controlled blasting at a rock quarry in the county. Campbell County Schools had dismissed their schools early due to the quarry, located less than 2,000 feet from the high school, performing a scheduled blast. Residents gathered for pleas to shut down the quarry. Campbell County officials later passed a resolution banning the development of quarries within 2,000 feet of a public building or power grid structure.

In 2009, Norfolk Southern Railway released plans of a proposed 1,300 acres (5.3 km^{2}) intermodal freight transport truck-and-train facility in Jefferson County, Tennessee as a part of the US$2.5 billion Crescent Corridor project in a US$133 million private-public partnership with state and Jefferson County officials. The proposed facility, if completed, would have generated 77 on-site jobs, 1,700 related-industry jobs in Jefferson and surrounding counties, and the potential of an annual income of US$60 million dollars a year. The project received extensive backlash from an organized group of affected property owners and farmers, citing the massive loss of land as a negative impact on Jefferson County's agricultural industry. The project status has remained stagnant since 2015, as Norfolk had no plans of constructing the facility in the short-term future, but plans on having the site property as a "long-term investment" according to a press release by the company's public relations director.

==== Virginia ====
In 1994, opposition from residents and historians contributed to the cancellation of the Disney's America theme park outside of Haymarket, Virginia.

==== Washington ====
In 1988, residents of Seattle's Broadmoor golf course and gated community successfully opposed the construction of a bike path between Washington Park Arboretum and Madison Park.

== Political implications ==
According to New York Times opinion writer Farhad Manjoo, "What Republicans want to do with I.C.E. and border walls, wealthy progressive Democrats are doing with zoning and Nimbyism. Preserving 'local character', maintaining 'local control', keeping housing scarce and inaccessible—the goals of both sides are really the same: to keep people out."

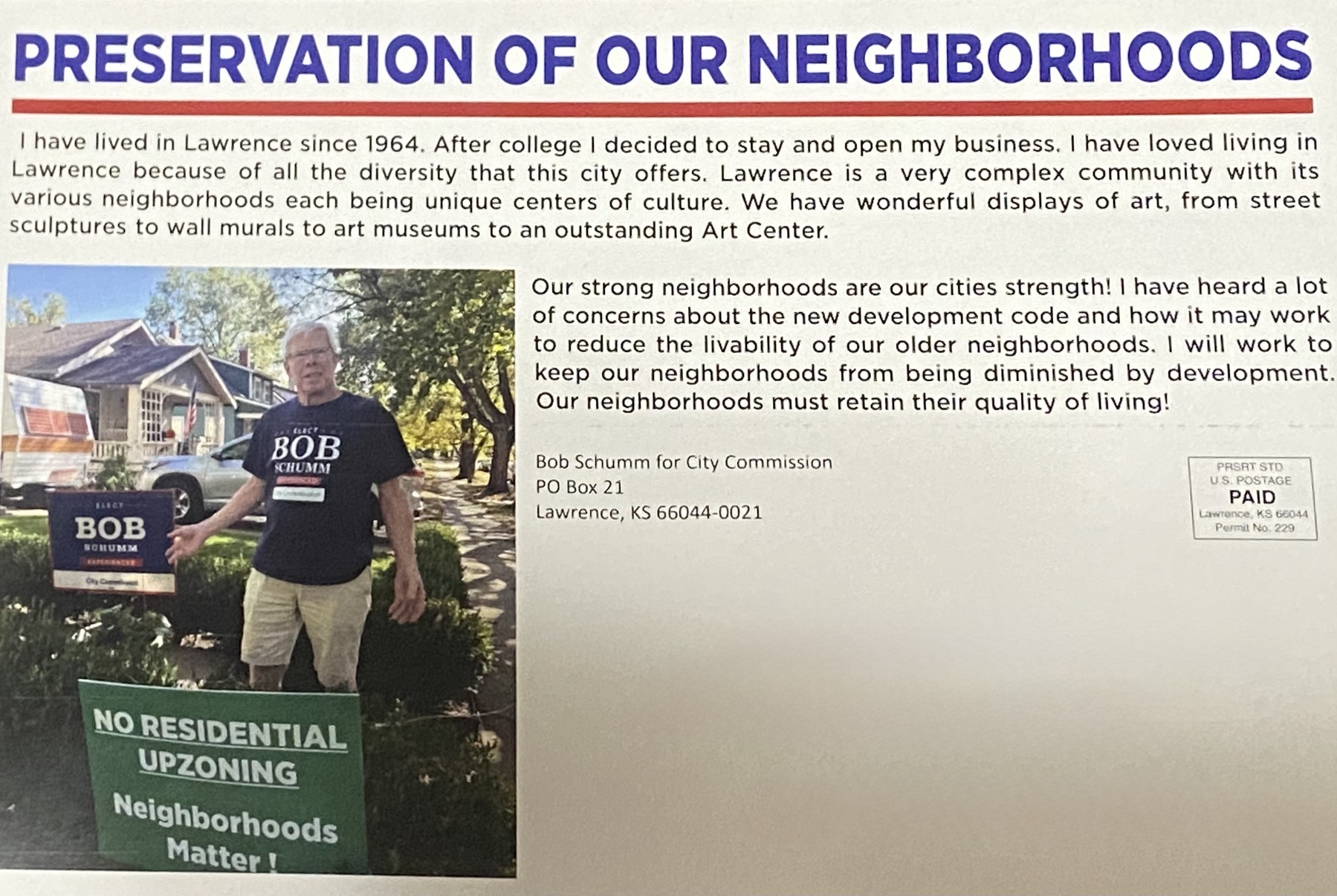
Political mailer using NIMBY phrases, such as “no upzoning” and "diminished by development"

In a 2020 paper exploring the relationship between homeowners' self-interest and pro-NIMBY attitudes among both self-identified liberals and conservatives, William Marble and Clayton Nall note: "Whether they are responding to different housing policies, responding to persuasive political messaging, or evaluating hypothetical proposals for local development, homeowners remain opposed to local development policies that threaten their self-interest."

Historian Nancy Shoemaker cites "Not-in-My-Backyard Colonialism" as one of twelve types of colonialism, in which an area is colonized to dispose of convicts or conduct dangerous experiments. She cites Australia and the Marshall Islands—used as a nuclear test site by the United States—as examples.

== Overcoming ==
Various means to overcome NIMBY opposition to infrastructure or development have been used, including persuasion, leaving the decision to an appointed board, or broadening the decision-making community (such as by overriding municipal zoning rules with countywide or statewide regulations). Another proposal is to pay neighbors of new housing developments, so that they experience benefits as well as costs, giving them an incentive to express political support. This can also mean providing local infrastructure and facilities like doctor's offices that would otherwise come under pressure from a new housing development.

A 2024 YouGov opinion poll and MRP model of British voters found that only 15-20% were "hard nimbys" who would never support housing developments near them. Most could support one under certain conditions.

== See also ==
- Specific
  - Citizens to Preserve Overton Park v. Volpe
  - Clamshell Alliance – local anti nuclear actions
  - Uruguay River pulp mill dispute
- Collective action problem
- Drawbridge mentality
- Eminent domain – the takeover of private land by a government in exchange for financial compensation
- Environmental racism
- Fenceline community
- Fenno's paradox
- Freeway revolt
- Gentrification
- Limousine liberal
- Locally unwanted land use
- Luddite
- Single-family zoning
- Smart growth
- Somebody else's problem
- Technophobia
- Urban planning
- Wind farm opposition
