= YIMBY =

Movement in support of infrastructure development

The YIMBY (/ˈjɪmbi/; or yimby, an acronym for the phrase for "yes in my back yard") movement, or YIMBYism, is a pro-housing social movement that focuses on encouraging new housing, opposing density limits (such as single-family zoning) and other housing supply regulations, and supporting public transportation. It stands in opposition to residents it calls NIMBY ("not in my back yard"), referring to those who generally oppose most forms of urban development in order to maintain the status quo, typically low-density suburban housing.

As an organized movement in the United States, the YIMBY movement began in the San Francisco Bay Area in the 2010s amid a housing affordability crisis and has subsequently become a potent political force in local, state, and national politics in the United States.

The YIMBY position supports increasing the supply of housing within cities where housing costs have escalated to unaffordable levels. They have also supported infrastructure development projects like improving housing development (especially for affordable housing or trailer parks), high-speed rail lines, homeless shelters, day cares, schools, universities and colleges, bike lanes, and pedestrian safety infrastructure. YIMBYs often seek rezoning that would allow more housing units to be produced per area or the repurposing of obsolete buildings, such as shopping malls, into housing. Cities that have adopted YIMBY policies have seen substantial increase in housing supply and reductions in rent. YIMBYism is about more than zoning laws, but to prioritise a developmental rather than stasis oriented property system "against a gentry of incumbent landowners who favor preservation of the built environment and protection of their vested rights in the zoned status quo."

The YIMBY movement has supporters across the political spectrum, including left-leaning adherents who believe housing production is a social justice issue, free-market libertarian proponents who think the supply of housing should not be regulated by the government, and environmentalists who believe land use reform will slow down exurban development into natural areas. Some YIMBYs also support efforts to shape growth in the public interest such as transit-oriented development, green construction, or expanding the role of public housing. YIMBYs argue cities can be made increasingly affordable and accessible by building more infill housing, and that greenhouse gas emissions will be reduced by denser cities.

== History ==
The term started being used in the 1980s by nuclear energy advocates in reference to opposition to nuclear plants in the wake of the Three Mile Island accident. By 1991, YIMBY was an established term since the 1980s, understood to mean "Yes-in-many-backyards".

A 1993 essay published in the Journal of the American Planning Association entitled "Planners' Alchemy, Transforming NIMBY to YIMBY: Rethinking NIMBY" used 'YIMBY' in general reference to development, not only housing development.

The pro-housing YIMBY position emerged in regions experiencing unaffordable housing prices. The Guardian and Raidió Teilifís Éireann say this movement began in the San Francisco Bay area in the 2010s due to high housing costs created as a result of the local technology industry adding many more jobs to the region than the number of housing units constructed in the same time span.

California YIMBY, the first political YIMBY group, was founded with the funding of Bay Area tech executives and companies. Dustin Moskovitz (Facebook, Asana) and his wife Cari Tuna donated $500,000 via their Open Philanthropy foundation; Nat Friedman (Xamarin, GitHub) and Zack Rosen (Pantheon Systems) donated another $500,000. Another $1 million donation came from the online payments company Stripe.

== Varieties of the YIMBY Movement ==
The YIMBY movement consists of various factions with differing motivations, the debate over YIMBY policies is not limited to a single political line, with YIMBY activists aligning from across the political spectrum.

=== Modern liberals' side ===
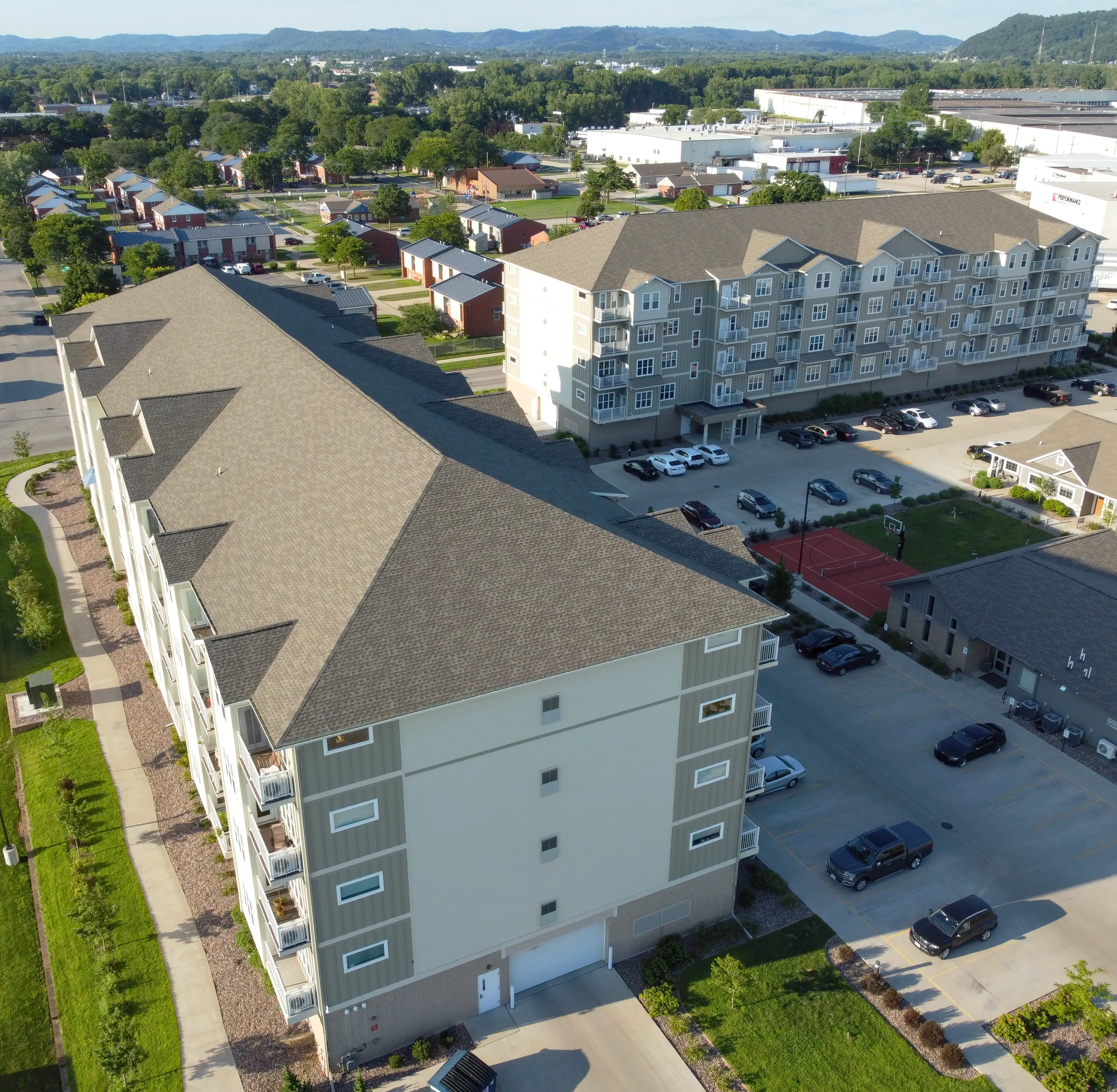
A multifamily housing unit

Surveys of both the public and elected officials show that Democrats are more likely than Republicans to support dense, multifamily housing. A 2024 study of mayors and city councils shows that "electing a Democrat as mayor leads to increased multifamily housing production. These effects are concentrated in cities where councils have less power over land use changes."

A major part of the political coalition aligned with the movement includes environmentalists and proponents of sustainability who support measures to legalize higher density. Urban development with higher density reduces the population’s need to travel by automobile, and thus, cities’ need to develop car-based infrastructure, which in the United States accounts for 29% of all greenhouse gas emissions.

=== Libertarians' side ===
Proponents of free market economics back zoning deregulation from a different perspective. They see increased housing density as a way to stimulate economic growth, foster innovation, and improve productivity by encouraging the free flow of people and ideas. In their view, deregulated housing markets enable more efficient land use, reduce housing costs, and enhance individual property rights.

A 2019 study by Chang-Tai Hsieh and Enrico Moretti in the American Economic Journal found that liberalization of land use regulations would lead to enormous productivity gains. The study estimated that strict land use regulations "lowered aggregate US growth by 36 percent from 1964 to 2009."

Similarly, a study conducted by the National Bureau of Economic research also estimated that deregulating land use in the United States would lead to productivity gains, with domestic output projected to increase between 3–6% and economic well-being lifted by 3–9%.

The free market faction, unlike liberals, believes that while higher-density housing should be allowed, it shouldn't be forced within existing cities solely for environmental reasons, with figures like libertarians, and free-market advocates like Matt Yglesias opposing urban growth boundaries. They argue that restricting development to urban areas contradicts consumer preferences.

== Opposition to YIMBY ==
Conversely, because "NIMBY" is often used as a pejorative, self-identified NIMBYs are rare. But opposition to YIMBY policies comes from various sides.

=== Tension with leftists and tenant advocates ===
The argument that new "luxury" housing will not help solve the housing shortage is a well-worn refrain of progressive urban politics. 30–40% of US voters believe more housing would increase (rather than decrease) prices, and another 30% believe it would have no effect.

Some socialists and renter advocates concerned about resident displacement through gentrification, who reject market-rate housing, disagree with housing economists that displacement is caused by lack of sufficient housing supply. In local elections, opposition to YIMBY policies is particularly pronounced; studies show that voter turnout among landowners nearly doubles when zoning issues are on the ballot.

Support for public housing and/or opposition to market-rate housing has been referred to as "PHIMBY", for "public housing in my backyard". Similarly, requiring a very high inclusionary (i.e., subsidized) percentage for new construction can result in less housing development, as subsidized homes are often more expensive to build than market-rate ones.

The origins of the modern YIMBY movement are separate from existing tenants' rights groups, which are suspicious of their association with young, white technology workers and may be wary of disrupting the status quo, which allows incumbent groups to use discretionary planning processes to negotiate for benefits while slowing development in general. Some have cited high vacancy rates and high rents in high-demand cities as a sign that increasing market-rate housing does not improve affordability. A common misconception is the "supply skepticism", which claims new housing would draw more migration than it houses and this would worsen the housing crisis further.

=== Populist Republicans and homeowners ===
Right-wing figures such as Donald Trump and Tucker Carlson have historically appealed to preservationists, local power brokers, and homeowners concerned about their property values.

=== Other opposition ===
Suburban residents often push for new housing developments to be concentrated in other areas with higher proportions of nonwhite populations, rather than in their own neighborhoods. The Bay Area's Regional Housing Needs Allocation process has been found to correlate with cities' white population percentages, resulting in fewer affordable housing allocations in areas with larger white populations. In response, elected officials and planners, seeking to appease these constituents, direct development into downtown areas, where higher and more expensive buildings are constructed, ultimately raising the cost per housing unit.

=== California ===
Evidence from California suggests that support for development is often higher when the development is less local. For example, a statewide upzoning bill will have more popular support statewide than a new apartment building will have from the immediate neighbors. This can vary by state. While the national Sierra Club is in favor of infill development, local Sierra Club chapters in California oppose making development easier in their own cities. A 2019 poll conducted by Lake Reach Partners for California YIMBY found that support for more infill development is higher among renters, Democrats, and Black people, though it enjoys majority support among all groups in California.

== Cases for upzoning or increasing density ==
Upzoning in the absence of additional housing production appeared to raise prices in Chicago, though the author disputed that this could lead to general conclusions about the affordability effects of upzoning.

In Auckland, New Zealand, the introduction of upzoning led to a stimulation of the housing construction industry and an increase in the city’s supply of housing.

In Portland, Oregon, an analysis of 17 years of land use deregulation policies found that individual land parcels in upzoned areas had significantly higher probabilities of development, density creation, and net additions to the Portland housing supply.

=== Fair housing ===
Research shows that strict land use regulations contribute to racial housing segregation in the United States. Surveys have shown that white communities are more likely to have strict land use regulations and whites are more likely to support those regulations.

== Cases against regulation of housing supply ==
Academic research has yielded some generalizable results on the effects of increasing housing supply.

=== Housing supply and prices ===
Several studies show that strict land use regulations reduce housing supply and raise the price of houses and land.

Some research into the granular effects of additional housing supply shows that new housing units in hot markets may not raise the rates by which rents increase in nearby market-rate units. This has been observed in outer boroughs of New York City (though not within 3.14 miles of the Empire State Building, where new housing is correlated with a slight rise in the rate of rental growth), in San Francisco (looking at housing units next to burned-out properties which were rebuilt), in Helsinki, and across multiple cities. Additionally, in California, new market-rate housing reduced displacement and slowed rises in rent. These studies do not show overall rent decreases from new housing units; in each study cited above, all housing became less affordable over time.

In case of constrained supply a shift in the demand curve changes the price of housing

The income elasticity of housing demand was estimated by one review in USA around 0.8 to 1.0 for renters and around 1.1 to 1.5 for owners. The price elasticity of housing demand was estimated between −0.2 to −1.0 with variations for location, time delay and between renters and owners. Supply can be constrained due to topography and regulations.

A study published in Urban Studies in 2006 observed price trends within Canadian cities and noted very slow price drops for older housing over a period of decades; the author concluded that newly constructed housing would not become affordable in the near future, meaning that filtering was not a viable method for producing affordable housing, especially in the most expensive cities. A more recent study on the subject of housing elasticity found an opposite conclusion; while newly constructed housing was often purchased at higher prices, the increase in supply at the high end of the market drove down prices everywhere else, leading to material benefits for people across all income groups.

Competition between real estate developers can affect timing of real estate development and real options valuation.

Improved price elasticity of new housing supply reduces the typical increases of local rents and house prices due to immigration. Immigration affects demand and supply of housing.

As housing and rent are among the most substantial expenditures in peoples' lives, abundant housing supply would contribute to lowering inflation.

=== Affordability and homelessness ===
The change in rent is inversely proportional to vacancy rates in a city, which are related to the demand for housing and the rate of construction. Homelessness rates are correlated with higher rents, especially in areas where rent exceeds 30% of an area's median income. Homelessness is driven by a number of causes, but it is more difficult to address homelessness in areas that suffer from a shortage of housing.

A 2023 survey of homeless individuals in California found that among typical causes of homelessness, many people were driven into homelessness due to high rents and low incomes which could not cover the cost of rent. YIMBY proponents would seek to lower rents by expanding the supply of housing. California's high housing prices are directly tied to a lack of housing supply.

== Regional movements ==
=== Australia ===
In 2021, Greater Canberra formed to advocate for more dense housing in Australia's capital city. YIMBY Melbourne and Sydney YIMBY formed in 2023. YIMBY Melbourne has since received funding from Open Philanthropy, as part of their Abundance & Growth fund. Alongside Greater Brisbane, these organisations make up the Abundant Housing Network Australia, a "national alliance of independent grassroots campaigners working to build a new vision for housing and cities."

=== Canada ===
In Toronto, a self-styled YIMBY movement was established in 2006 by community members in response to significant development proposals in the West Queen West area, and a YIMBY festival, launched the same year, has been held annually since. The festival's organizer stated that "YIMBYism is a community mindset that's open to change and development." An advocacy group called HousingNowTO fights to maximize the number of homes when the government builds housing. Another group, More Neighbours Toronto (MNTO), advocates for policy changes to increase the housing supply.

In Vancouver, Abundant Housing Vancouver was formed in 2016 to support more housing. In Ottawa, Make Housing Affordable was formed in 2021 to advocate for YIMBY policies.

=== Slovakia ===
In 2014, the blog YIMBY Bratislava was created as a response to rising aversion to development in Bratislava, the capital of Slovakia. The blog informs about development in the city, promotes it, but also criticizes it. In 2018 it was renamed to YIM.BA — Yes In My Bratislava. It is a private blog of one author with the fan group of its readers and fans on Facebook.

=== The Netherlands ===
In 2012, the YIMBY platform RTM XL in Rotterdam was created as a response to rising aversion to the development of the Zalmhaven tower in Rotterdam. RTM XL informs about development in the city, promotes it, but also criticizes policies of the city on development and mobility. In recent years similar platforms EHVXL in Eindhoven, DHXL in The Hague and UTRXL in Utrecht were founded.

=== Sweden ===
Yimby is an independent political party network founded in Stockholm in 2007, which advocates physical development, densification and promotion of urban environment with chapters in Stockholm, Gothenburg, and Uppsala. The group believes that the PBL (Plans and Constructions Act, from 1987) is a major impediment to any new construction, and should be eliminated or dramatically reformed.

=== United Kingdom ===
London YIMBY was set up in 2016, publishing its first report with the Adam Smith Institute in 2017 which received national press coverage. Its members advocate a policy termed 'Better Streets'. This proposal would allow residents of individual streets to vote by a two-thirds majority to pick a design code and allow extensions or replacement buildings of up to five or six stories, allowing suburban homes to be gradually replaced by mansion blocks. This flagship policy has achieved a degree of recognition, being endorsed by former Liberal Democrat MP Sam Gyimah and the former leader of the House of Commons Jacob Rees-Mogg.

Other YIMBY groups have been set up in individual London boroughs and in cities suffering similar housing shortages, such as Brighton, Bristol and Edinburgh. The town-builder Create Streets has also argued for intensification of existing streets, for reducing planning risk to enable a more diverse range of housebuilders and for more popular design to discourage NIMBY opposition to homes.

Members of the British YIMBY movement have been critical of established planning organisations such as the Town and Country Planning Association and the Campaign to Protect Rural England, accusing them of pursuing policies that worsen Britain's housing shortage.

There is growing support for the YIMBY movement within the Labour party following its 2024 electoral success. Prime minister Keir Starmer has described himself as a YIMBY proponent.

=== United States ===
Pro-housing policies proposed by Kamala Harris during her 2024 presidential campaign were among the first to bring YIMBY ideas to the national political mainstream. During his speech at the 2024 Democratic National Convention, former president Barack Obama stated "if we want to make it easier for more young people to buy a home, we need to build more units and clear away some of the outdated laws and regulations that made it harder to build homes for working people in this country." Following the election, a bipartisan group of lawmakers launched the Congressional YIMBY Caucus on November 21, 2024 to advocate for federal legislation to increase the housing supply.

==== California ====
The YIMBY movement has been particularly strong in California, a state experiencing a substantial housing shortage crisis. Since 2017, YIMBY groups in California have pressured California state and its localities to pass laws to expedite housing construction, follow their own zoning laws, and reduce the stringency of zoning regulations. YIMBY activists have also been active in helping to enforce state law on housing by bringing law-breaking cities to the attention of authorities.

Since 2014, in response to California's housing affordability crisis, several YIMBY groups were created in the San Francisco Bay Area. These groups have lobbied both locally and at the state level for increased housing production at all price levels, as well as using California's Housing Accountability Act (the "anti-NIMBY law") to sue cities when they attempt to block or downsize housing development. The New York Times explained about one organization: "Members want San Francisco and its suburbs to build more of every kind of housing. More subsidized affordable housing, more market-rate rentals, more high-end condominiums."

In 2017, YIMBY groups successfully lobbied for the passage of Senate Bill 35 (SB 35), which streamlines housing under certain criteria, among other "housing package" of bills.

From 2018 to 2020, the lobbying group California YIMBY joined over 100 Bay Area technology industry executives in supporting state senator Scott Wiener's Senate Bills 827 and 50. The bills failed in the state senate after multiple attempts at passage. California YIMBY received $100,000 from Yelp CEO Jeremy Stoppelman, $1 million from Irish entrepreneurs John and Patrick Collison through their company, Stripe, and $500,000 raised by Pantheon Systems CEO Zach Rosen and GitHub CEO Nat Friedman.

YIMBY groups in California have supported the split roll effort to eliminate Proposition 13 protections for commercial properties, and supported the ballot measure known as Proposition 15, which would implement this change but failed to pass in 2020. This change would have potentially incentivized local governments to approve commercial property development (for its attendant business, payroll, sales and property tax revenue) over residential development, while providing a significant new source of funding for localities, mostly earmarked for education.

==== Massachusetts ====
Since 2012, several YIMBY groups were established in the greater Boston area. One group argues that "...more smart housing development is the only way to retain a middle class in pricey cities like Boston and Cambridge."

==== New York ====
Several YIMBY groups, chiefly Open New York, have been created in New York City; according to an organizer: "In high-opportunity areas where people actually really want to live, the well-heeled, mostly white residents are able to use their perceived political power to stop the construction of basically anything," adding that low-income communities don't share that ability to keep development at bay: "Philosophically, we think that the disproportionate share of the burden of growth has been borne by low income, minority or industrial neighborhoods for far too long.".

In 2011, a news website called New York YIMBY was created that focuses on construction trends in New York City. While this news website is not strictly related to the YIMBY political movement, in an interview with Politico, the creator of the site stated: "Zoning is the problem, not development in this city. I think people don't really understand that."

==== List of United States organizations ====
Name	Area
5th Square	Philadelphia, Pennsylvania
A Better Cambridge	Cambridge, Massachusetts
Abundant Housing Illinois	Illinois
Abundant Housing LA	Greater Los Angeles
Abundant Housing Massachusetts	Massachusetts
AURA	Austin, Texas
Bend YIMBY	Bend, Oregon
California Renters Legal Advocacy and Education Fund (CaRLA)	California
California YIMBY	California
East Bay for Everyone	San Francisco East Bay
East Bay YIMBY	San Francisco East Bay
Greater Greater Washington	Washington metropolitan area
Greenbelt Alliance	San Francisco Bay Area
Grow the Richmond	Richmond District, San Francisco
Legal Towns Foundation	New Jersey
Open New York	New York City
Dallas Neighbors For Housing	Dallas, Texas
Neighbors for More Neighbors	Minneapolis
Palmetto YIMBY	South Carolina
People for Housing Orange County	Orange County, California
Peninsula for Everyone	San Francisco Peninsula
Portland for Everyone	Portland, Oregon
Santa Cruz YIMBY	Santa Cruz, California
SF YIMBY	San Francisco
ShelterWF	Whitefish, MT
Sightline Institute	Pacific Northwest
Somerville YIMBY	Somerville, Massachusetts
Sustainable Growth Yolo	Yolo County, California
SV@Home	Santa Clara County, California
Up for Growth	United States
Vermonters for People Oriented Places	Vermont
YIMBY Action	United States
YIMBY Democrats of San Diego County	San Diego County, California
YIMBY Denver	Denver
YIMBY Durham	Durham, North Carolina
YIMBY Wilmington	Wilmington, North Carolina
YIMBY Law	California
YIMBYs of Northern Virginia	Northern Virginia

=== International ===
In September 2018, the third annual Yes In My Backyard conference, named "YIMBYTown" occurred in Boston, hosted by that area's YIMBY community. The first YIMBY conference was held in 2016 in Boulder, Colorado and hosted by a group that included Boulder's former mayor, who commented that: "It is clearer than ever that if we really care about solving big national issues like inequality and climate change, tackling the lack of housing in thriving urban areas, caused largely by local zoning restrictions, is key." The second annual conference was held in the San Francisco Bay Area city of Oakland, California. These conferences have attracted attendees from the United States, as well as some from Canada, England, Australia, and other countries.

== YIGBY - Yes in God's Backyard ==
In California and around the United States, at the request of coalitions of faith organizations with affordable housing developers, governments have been enacting new laws that override local zoning which previously prohibited the construction of affordable housing on church-owned land. In 2023, California passed SB4 which legalized up to 30 housing units per acre on property owned by churches and non-profit colleges, as long as all of the units rent for below market-rate. A UC Berkeley study found that this law opens up about 170,000 acres of land for potential affordable housing development across California.

== See also ==
=== Related movements ===
- Deregulation – Process of removing or reducing state regulations
- Georgism – Economic philosophy centered on common ownership of land
- Mixed-use development – Type of urban development strategy
- New Urbanism – Urban design movement promoting sustainable land use
- Regulatory reform
- Supply-side progressivism – Political ideology
- Smart growth – Urban planning philosophy
- Transit-oriented development – Urban planning prioritising transit

=== Other ===
- Missing middle housing
- Urban economics
- Urban planning
- Real estate economics
- Abundance (Klein and Thompson book)
