= Charles I. Jones =

American economist

Chad Jones
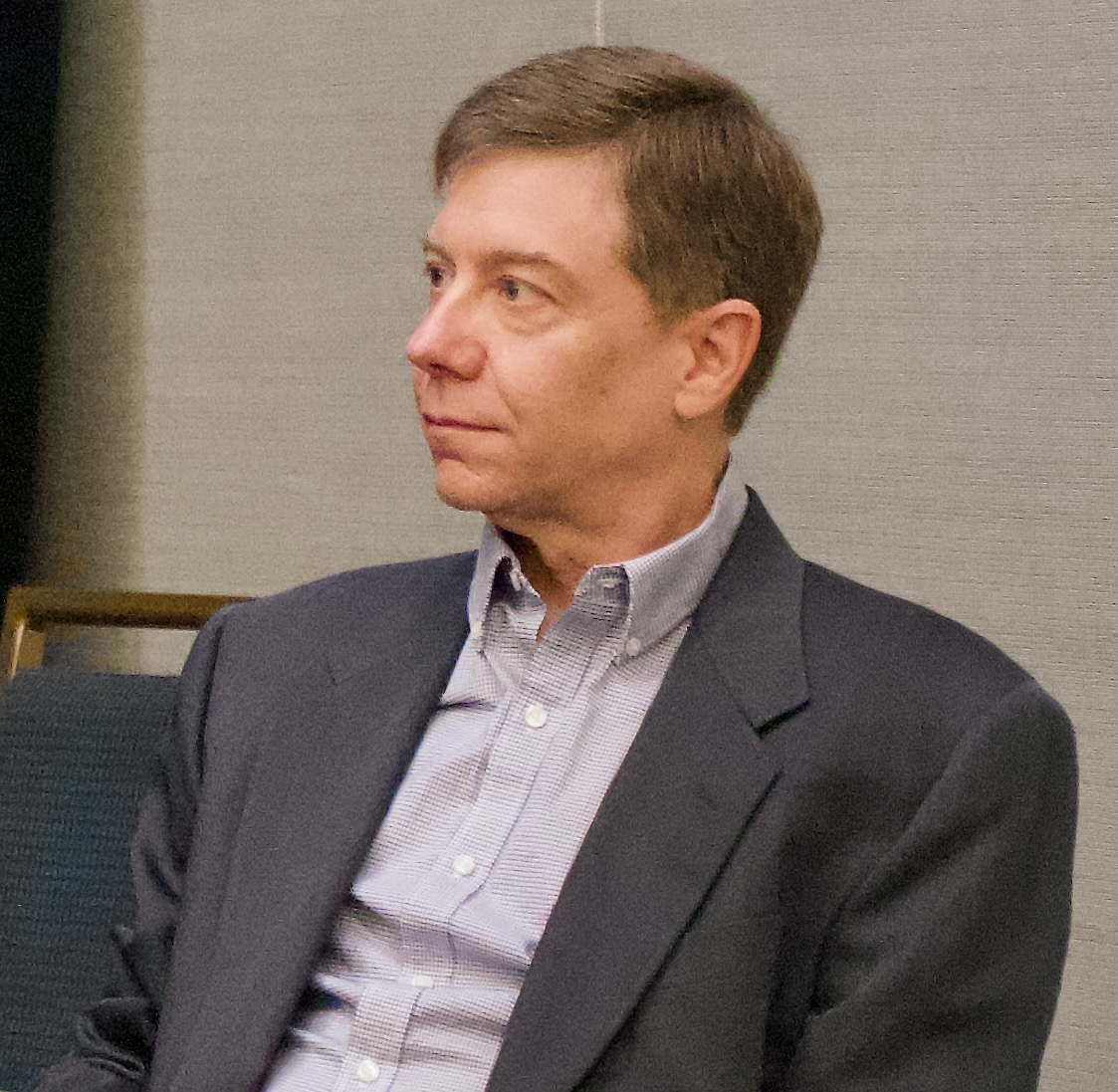
- Born: Charles Irving Jones

Academic background
- Education: Harvard University (BA); Massachusetts Institute of Technology (MA, PhD)

Academic work
- Discipline: Development economics Innovation economics
- Institutions: Stanford University

Charles Irving "Chad" Jones is an American economist who has served as the STANCO 25 Professor of Economics at Stanford University since 2009. He studies growth theory and economic development, serving as a research associate of the National Bureau of Economic Research. In 2019, he was elected to the American Academy of Arts and Sciences and as a Fellow of the Econometric Society in 2020. Jones was a previous co-editor of Econometrica.

At Stanford, Jones holds several other credentials, including a Faculty Affiliate at the King Center on Global Development, and a Senior Fellow at the Stanford Institute for Economic Policy Research.

== Education ==
Jones earned his AB in Economics from Harvard University in 1989, where he graduated summa cum laude. His PhD in economics was completed at the Massachusetts Institute of Technology in 1993.

== Academic contributions ==
Jones's work seeks to explain why economic growth occurs, why some countries are richer than others, the role of research and development in economic growth, and what we should do about artificial intelligence, in addition to incorporating life, death, and birth into economic models.

Jones first worked on endogenous growth models with his 1994 publication on its origins. Growth theory began in earnest with Solow, who broke down production into two factors, labor and capital, with labor multiplied by A, representing technology. Because capital has declining marginal returns and we must pay for depreciation, a steady state exists in which there is no growth. In order to accurately describe economic growth, we must have exogenous technological change. Exogenous technological change is obviously unrealistic, and more importantly it did not well explain the world. The decreasing returns to capital implied that poor countries should be rapidly converging to the level of rich countries. As Bob Lucas notes, since the return to capital should be much higher in poor countries, we should expect capital to flow to poor countries.

To explain this, economists sought to endogenies idea creation. The rate of technological growth is determined by our investment into finding new ideas. Takeoff into infinite technological growth in finite time is prevented by companies either not receiving the full social value of their inventions (Romer) or by businesses being able to take the business of firms which invested earlier (Aghion-Howitt). Depending on the rate at which ideas spread, and how they spread across borders, income in different countries can permanently diverge.

Chad Jones's first papers published in 1995 challenged this new paradigm. In "Time Series Tests of Endogenous Growth Models", he argues that the new models give strong predictions about government policy changes. If government policy permanently changes the return to investment, or openness to trade, then we should expect it to show in the growth rate in GDP per capita. Since it hasn't, "either by some astonishing coincidence all of the movements in variables … have been offsetting, or the hallmark of the endogenous growth models … is misleading." (p. 496)

In "R&D-Based Models of Economic Growth" published in 1995, he shows that if there are decreasing marginal returns in finding new ideas, then in the long-run we revert to the simple story of the Solow model. Over the past couple of decades, it is apparent that the data regarding the boom in population and disproportionate increase in research does not match up. It is assumed that larger economies with lots of researchers would grow fast, but this is not the trend in the real world. Economic growth is once more determined by variables commonly taken to be exogenous, like population growth. R&D matters for growth, but does not generate increasing growth rates because idea faces diminishing returns. This is the Jones model. It was found that, "the R & D equation that the growth rate of the economy is proportional to the level of resources devoted to R & D is obviously fake" (Jones 1999). Jones developed his model to explain for this differentiation between the population growth rate and TFP.

He would later return to the topic in 2020 with Nicholas Bloom, John Van Reenen, and Michael Webb, and test "Are Ideas Getting Harder to Find?". We have continued to find new ideas, but only at the cost of continuously raising research inputs. Between the 1930s and today, total factor productivity has risen by about 2% every year, while the effective number of researchers has increased nearly 25 times over. In computer chips, Moore's Law (that the density of computer chips doubles every year) has held, but a doubling now requires 18 times as many researchers as it did in the 1970s. We face the scepter of eternal stagnation, without a substantial change in how we find ideas.

Jones, alongside Andrew Bernard, argued in favor of the role played by technology in economic growth, challenging the prominence of both physical and human capital accumulation theories that dominated the empirical convergence literature at the time of its 1996 publication. They demonstrate that differences in cross-country and cross-sector technologies have evolved in ways that explain convergence patterns, specifically in the OECD. Jones' main contribution is to advocate for more complex models that incorporate technology adoption and its transfer as a key driver of convergence, which shifted the debate past simple capital-based explanations of relative growth and output levels.

Robert Hall joins Jones in a 1997 research publication that pivots the empirical growth literature from explaining differences in long-run rates to explaining persistent differences in levels of output per worker. Hall and Jones expand on Jones' typical emphasis of cultural factors driving growth, arguing that differences in economic activity across countries are driven primarily by "social infrastructure", or institutions and government policies that determine the overall productive economic environment. This work reframes conversations of growth around institutional quality and encouragement of productive activities as the fundamental determinant of income levels. Following this, Jones published a separate piece titled "On the Evolution of the World Income Distribution", where he documents key facts about the world distribution of GDP per worker since 1960. His research showed substantial dispersion and persistence, with many countries remaining poor relative to the richest. Jones' prediction of future distribution projects meaningful long-run improvement with the share of very poor countries decreasing substantially. Overall, the paper provides an empirical and forward-looking framework for understanding convergence and global income dynamics.

Ideas are of profound importance to economic growth in Jones's 1998 published telling. Ideas are the quintessential example of a public good – once invented, everyone is able to copy the ideas, without necessarily paying the inventor. As Thomas Jefferson wrote, "He who receives an idea from me, receives instruction himself without lessening mine". Since finding the idea took considerable investment, we underproduce ideas relative to the social optimum. Jones and John C. Williams (1998) estimate that, at a minimum, the optimal rate of investment into research and development is two to four times higher than the actual level of investment. This implies that the socially optimal tax rate may be much lower than commonly estimated. Typical optimal tax papers assume that there are no spillovers from labor, and that taxation should simply maximize government revenue. Allowing for ideas to be disproportionately generated by high-earners, as Jones turns this on its head, and suggests that, if anything, marginal tax rates on the very highest bracket should be smaller than those with less income.

A possible source of increasing research productivity is artificial intelligence. With Philippe Aghion and Ben Jones, Chad Jones wrote the formative work on modelling artificial intelligence. If AI enters into the discovery of new ideas, then it is possible to get a "singularity", or infinite growth in finite time. If, however, production is constrained by sources which are hard to automate, then we should expect the gains to go to the scarce factor. This follows from Baumol's theorem (1967), where productivity growth in one sector increases the opportunity cost, and hence the wages, of a stagnant sector. This artificial intelligence could be misaligned, however, and do things which might destroy humans. Jones has several papers investigating how much we would be willing to pay to prevent catastrophe. With log utility, we are remarkably unconcerned about existential risk. If our coefficient of relative risk aversion is greater than two, then we would be willing to spend a very large portion of GDP on risk-mitigation. The exception is if technology portends to increase life-span, in which case we should be more willing to take risks of catastrophe.

He has also studied life, death, and well-being. "The End of Economic Growth? Unintended Consequences of a Declining Population" explores the consequences of falling birth rates. Since, in many models, a greater number of people leads to a greater number of ideas, a falling birth rate leads to living standards stagnating as we slide toward extinction. What's more, if we make a standard assumption that parents derive utility from their children's well-being, it is possible for the optimal outcome to be human extinction, if we wait too long. There are only two stable outcomes – one where living standards grow without bound, and extinction. In "Population and Welfare" (with Mohamad Adhami, Mark Bils, and Pete Klenow) he proposes extending GDP to take into account differences in the number of people able to experience heightened living standards.

Jones, with Robert Hall, had an important conceptual influence on Daron Acemoglu, Simon Johnson, and Jim Robinson's theory of institutions as the fundamental cause of differences in long-run growth. In "Why Do Some Countries Produce So Much More Output per Worker than Others", they attribute growth to particular sources. Distance from equator and language countries with better social infrastructure have higher capital accumulation higher productivity and much higher output per worker. Greater physical capital intensity or human capital attainment accounts for only a small part of differences in productivity. Differences in physical capital and educational attainment can only partially explain the variation in output per worker," (Hall and Jones 1999). They attribute the rest to "social infrastructure", a precursor to the institutions of Acemoglu, Johnson, Robinson. Hall and Jones come up with a model to find the effects social infrastructure has on capital to see if they can explain this huge difference. After running their regressions they find that, "a country's long-run economic performance is determined primarily by the institutions and government policies that make up the economic environment within which individuals and firms make investments, create and transfer ideas, and produce goods and services," (Hall and Jones 1999). These institutions and policies promote the creation of new goods and services that could improve output per worker. For example, before the automatic planting tractor was invented, it took farmers a lot more time to plant their crops. What's more, since the rate of capital accumulation is to some degree endogenous to social infrastructure, differences in output directly attributable to capital intensity may all ultimately be due to social conditions.

Jones has also had an influence on the study of production networks in the economy, with "Intermediate Goods and Weak Links". Beginning with Michael Kremer's "The O-Ring Theory of Economic Development", economists have recognized that production occurs in many steps, errors in any one of which can wreck the entire product. Improvements can then have a non-linear impact on production. For example, if government mismanagement of power plants raises the cost of electricity, this reduces output in banking and construction. If it is harder to finance and construct projects, then it is harder to improve productivity in electrical generation. In addition, productivity in a firm depends on performance along multiple dimensions. He gives the example of how "textile producers require raw materials, knitting machines, a healthy and trained labor force, knowledge of how to produce, security, business licenses, transportation networks, electricity, etc. These inputs enter in a complementary fashion, in the sense that problems with any input can substantially reduce overall output. Without electricity or production knowledge or raw materials or security or business licenses, production is likely to be severely curtailed." This can be seen as fundamentally analogous to his work on AI. Growth might be constrained not by the rate of progress in what we improve best, but in what we can improve least. These frictions can lead to profound and permanent misallocation.

Jones, with Hsieh, Hurst, and Klenow, has contributed to our understanding of misallocation in the labor market. Between 1960 and 2010, the fraction of doctors and lawyers who were white men fell from 94% to 62%. If people's innate abilities were the same over time, then many people were being sorted into the wrong jobs. They estimate that 44% of U.S. economic growth between 1960 and 2010 was due to the better matching of workers and jobs. Jones, Brouillette, and Klenow estimate, however, that the gap in welfare for Black Americans, compared to white Americans, is considerably higher than the gap in consumption.

In 2002, Jones wrote "Sources of U.S. Economic Growth in a World of Ideas." This paper discusses how America was able to maintain steady growth over the last 125 years even with large changes in the country's economy. His paper focuses on changes in education and R&D. Over the last century, the U.S. has experienced a large increase in education and R&D yet, "the growth rate of U.S. per capita GDP has been surpisingly stable over the last 125 years," (Jones 2002). Jones explains that the investment rate cannot rise forever and when it levels off so does growth. Eventually, the economy will begin to decrease and so will growth. This cycle continues and in the long run, results in steady growth.

In the mid-2000s, Jones wrote several papers to explain rising expenditures on healthcare. The first of the papers emphasizes the marginal utility of a dollar spent rising with technological improvements. Medical technology allows us to do things which were not available at any price in the past. Thus, people will spend more on healthcare as a percentage of their incomes as technology advances. The other, with Robert Hall, explores many of the same themes as his work on AI risk mitigation. As our consumption rises, we value the time in which to consume more, because the first unit of consumption in each period does not have declining marginal returns. In 2010, Paul Romer and Jones updated Nicholas Kaldor's famous 1961 stylized facts on economic growth, replacing the single focus on physical capital with four additional central variables: ideas, institutions, population, and human capital. Using dynamic models, they reveal subtle interactions between these forces and summarize almost three decades of progress in growth research. The publication reframes the research agenda around these richer ingredients as the key drivers of long-run economic development.

He joined John Fernald in a 2014 examination of the U.S. GDP-per-person growth over the next 50 years through the lens of modern growth theory. Together, they highlight the historical stability of roughly 2 percent annual growth since 1870, noting temporary deviations such as the Great Depression, while warning that other countries have experienced persistent level shifts. By applying growth-theory insights to assess future American prospects, the emphasize uncertainty around ideas and innovation, and the possibility of sustained changed in trend productivity growth.

Jones is currently completing research on growth economics, including the economics of population, AI, and existential risk.

== Publications ==
=== Books ===
- Charles I. Jones (2024). Macroeconomics (6rd ed.). Norton & Company. ISBN 978-1324063612.
- Charles I. Jones (2024). Introduction to Economic Growth (4th ed.). Norton & Company. ISBN 978-1324059578.

== Awards and honors ==
1. Charles and Melissa Froland Faculty Fellow, 2017-2020
2. Fellow of the Econometric Society, 2020-Present
3. Member of the American Academy of Arts and Sciences, 2019-Present
4. The Chai-Siriwatwechakul Faculty Fellow, 2022-2023
