= BILS =

BILS may refer to:

- Bank Indonesia Liquidity Support, a government policy in Indonesia
- Bangladesh Institute of Labour Studies, a labour NGO in Bangladesh

== See also ==
- Bill (disambiguation)
- Mark Bils (born 1958), American economist
