= Pete Klenow =

American economist

Academic background
- Education: University of California, Berkeley (BS); Stanford University (PhD)
- Thesis: Externalities and business cycles (1991)
- Doctoral advisors: Robert Hall; Kenneth L. Judd

Academic work
- Discipline: Industrial Organization, Macroeconomics
- Institutions: Chicago Booth School of Business; Federal Reserve Bank of Minneapolis; Stanford University

Peter Joseph Klenow (born 1964) is an American economist and the Ralph Landau Professor in Economic Policy at Stanford University. He is known for his work on firm productivity in the developing world and on measures of economic growth.

He is a member of the American Academy of Arts and Sciences and the Econometric Society. He has published in the Quarterly Journal of Economics, the American Economic Review, Econometrica, and The Journal of Political Economy.

== Biography ==
Klenow received his PhD from Stanford in 1991 with a dissertation on "Externalities and Business Cycles." He was advised by Robert Hall and Kenneth L. Judd.

Klenow was a junior professor in the Chicago Booth School of Business from 1991 until 2000. He then joined the Federal Reserve Bank of Minneapolis as a senior economist. In 2003, he returned to Stanford to join the faculty.

In 2025, Klenow was appointed a co-editor of Econometrica. From 2017 to 2023, he was a founding co-editor of AER:Insights.

== Work ==
=== Economic measurement ===
Much of Klenow's work has focused on improving our measurements of macroeconomic variables. With Mark Bils, a frequent coauthor, Klenow wrote several papers on measuring the quality of goods and human capital, and its implication for growth models. They proposed using the increase in the willingness-to-pay of consumers as a fraction of their income to test how good quality changes as one’s income increases. Automobiles have a steep curve, suggesting that quality rises sharply, while the flat curve of vacuum cleaners suggests that the same technology is available to everyone.

Economists have long observed that gross domestic product (GDP), the most commonly used measure of national welfare, does not capture many dimensions of social welfare like leisure and household production. With Chad Jones, Klenow has proposed methods to capture health, consumption, leisure, and inequality in welfare measures. Adding these items to welfare statistics causes living standards in France and Germany to look more similar to those of the United States.

Klenow has proposed that we compare welfare across countries as a function of the number of people consuming, not just consumption per person. Using this approach, welfare has risen considerably in countries with high fertility rates like Mexico, while countries with low population growth like Japan have stagnated.

Klenow has worked to improve measures of total factor productivity. His paper with Philippe Aghion, Antonin Bergeaud, Timo Boppart, and Huiyu Li corrects a bias in how statistical bureaus adjust for new product varieties. If a new product appears which surpasses a previously existing product so completely the old product is no longer sold, its quality adjusted price is necessarily below the old one. Statistical bureaus have no basis for saying how much lower it is, and presume that its price growth is the same as similar products which did not disappear entirely. They found that growth between 1983 and 2005 was substantially higher per year than otherwise believed.

With co-author Austin Goolsbee, Klenow developed the Adobe Digital Price Index, a comprehensive measure of online inflation.

=== Misallocation and firm productivity ===
Klenow's 2009 paper with Chang-Tai Hsieh, “Misallocation and Manufacturing TFP in China and India,” has been cited more than 7,000 times as of March 2025. More productive firms should have a larger share of the market, but they are often prevented by corruption or unfair regulations. To estimate this effect, the paper describes a tractable way to measure how far off the distribution of firms is from optimal. Revenue productivity – the amount of revenue brought in per unit of input – should be equal across all firms. These distortions are large in China and India than the US; if brought to the same level the US, they find that total factor productivity would rise 30-50% in China and 40-60% in India.

In a later paper, Hsieh and Klenow (2014) propose reasons that country-level productivity diminishes when older firms cannot expand their most productive plants. In the United States, plants which are more than 40 years old are 7 times larger than those less than 5 years old. But in India, 40-year-old plants are only 40 percent larger than new plants. Hsieh and Klenow estimate that this inability for productive plants to grow reduces total factor productivity by as much as 25 percent. In Mexico, moving production factors to the most-productive plants would double manufacturing productivity.

Efforts to measure factor misallocation are sensitive to the measurement practices of national statistical bureaus. For example, India does not clean its firm data. A firm omitting a zero in their revenue would likely be caught in the US, but not in India. Klenow's 2021 paper with Mark Bils and Cian Rian proposes a correction which revises down the degree of misallocation in the developing world. Shocks to productivity should change its revenue and inputs in the same proportion is if it correctly measured, and will be disproportionate if a firm is systematically misreporting its true values.

Klenow's factor misallocation papers were cited as exemplary research in his induction to The Econometric Society. Alex Tabarrok has described Hsieh and Klenow's first factor misallocation paper as “pioneering”.

=== Labor market discrimination ===
In addition, Klenow’s work has shed light on the harmful effects of discrimination on the allocation of talent. Hsieh, Hurst, Jones, and Klenow (2019) quantified the gains from allowing people to work the jobs which they are most suited for. In an era of anti-black discrimination, or of workplace sexism, fully capable people were kept from achieving their full potential. The effects were large: they estimate that the reduction of labor force discrimination is responsible for between 20 and 40 percent of per person income growth in the United States between 1960 and 2010.

When first released, the working paper received coverage on the blog Marginal Revolution. U.S. Treasury officials have cited the paper to show that labor market discrimination limits economic growth. Marianne Bertrand has profiled the work as an example of economists valuing the adverse effects of inequality, not only inefficiency, as a problem for economic growth. Others have argued the paper's approach does not readily explain the persistence of racism, since it implies self-imposed economic harm. Sandy Darity argues racism can be better explained as a dominant racial group increasing its share of national income by excluding a nondominant racial group.

=== Semiconductor industry ===
Klenow’s career began with a series of papers about "learning by doing" in the semiconductor industry with Doug Irwin, which he extended in a general look at learning curves in manufacturing in 1998. They found that, while there were significant economies of scale in creating particular designs of computer chips, these did not extend from design to design. Economies of scale were contained largely within the firm, with some spillovers internationally, but did not stay within the country. Their results imply that the conditions for tariffs to improve outcomes are not met.

== Awards and honors ==
Klenow is a member of the:

- Econometric Society (2014)
- American Academy of Arts and Sciences (2015)
