= Chang-Tai Hsieh =

Taiwanese-American economist

- Born: 1970 (age 55–56); Taiwan

Academic background
- Education: Swarthmore College (BA); University of California, Berkeley (PhD)

Academic work
- Discipline: Macroeconomics Economic Growth

Chang-Tai Hsieh (born 1970) is a Taiwanese-American economist. He researches factors that constrain economic productivity and the causes of economic growth in East Asia. Hsieh's work with Enrico Moretti on the housing supply restrictions has been influential in policy debates on land use regulation.

Hsieh is the Phyllis and Irwin Winkelreid Distinguished Service Professor of Economics at the University of Chicago. He is a member of the American Academy of Arts and Sciences and the Academia Sinica. He is a founding director of the International Growth Centre at the London School of Economics.

== Career ==
Hsieh was born in Taiwan around 1970, where his father worked as an aviation engineer at Tainan Air Base. He grew up in Singapore, then Iran, and then Paraguay after his father lost his job in the Iranian Revolution. In 1990, he worked at Taiwan Semiconductor Manufacturing Corporation.

Hsieh started college in 1986 at The Clarkson School, a one-year program at Clarkson University for gifted students. He, then, received a B.A. in economics with high honors from Swarthmore College in 1991, and a Ph.D. in economics from the University of California, Berkeley, in 1998. He was a professor at Princeton from 1998 to 2003, and a professor from 2003 to 2008 at UC Berkeley, before moving to Chicago.

== Research ==
=== Misallocation and economic growth ===
==== Firm size and productivity ====
Much of Hsieh's work has focused on the effects of misallocation on economic growth. His most-cited paper is “Misallocation and Manufacturing TFP in China and India” (2009), coauthored with Pete Klenow. In an efficient economy, all firms should have an equal marginal product of capital and labor. Since some firms might have preferential access to credit, or biased government treatment, some plants will be inefficiently large or small. Hsieh and Klenow develop a simple and tractable way to measure how far from optimal the size distribution of firms is. Using it, they estimate that if China were as misallocated as the United States is, then total factor productivity would be 30 to 50 percent higher.

Hsieh and Klenow returned to the topic in 2014 to show that, while manufacturing plants everywhere start small, productive plants in India and Mexico grow much slower than those in the United States.

==== Housing regulation ====
In addition to firm size, Hsieh's research concerns misallocation in space. Because of restrictions on construction of housing, such as zoning, people are unable to move to the places they would prefer to live and work in. The net effect is that far fewer people live in major cities like San Francisco and New York City, and that they are far less productive than they would have been without restrictions on housing construction. Hsieh shows, along with Enrico Moretti, that this leads to a substantial difference in economic growth. In their estimate, aggregate growth was reduced by 36% between 1964 and 2009. In the New York Times, Hsieh and Moretti liken this effect to losing the entire economic output of New York State.

Since the working paper was first published in 2015, its estimated effects on United States GDP have been regularly cited in news media. The results have helped motivate several proposals for American zoning and land use reforms. The article has been described by Bryan Caplan as “the single most influential article ever published on housing regulation” and by Ilya Somin as “highly influential” on the YIMBY movement.

However, Hsieh and Moretti's estimates of productivity loss have been debated by other scholars. Caplan showed that an arithmetic error resulted in understating the GDP effects by a factor of four. Economist Brian Greaney corrected coding errors, and argued that correctly implementing the paper's model results in no significant net change in national economic output.

==== Labor misallocation and discrimination ====
Misallocation can also occur due to discrimination by race and by gender. Between 1960 and 2010, the fraction of doctors and lawyers who were white men fell from 94% to 62%. If people's innate abilities were the same over time, then many people were being sorted into the wrong jobs. Hsieh, Hurst, Klenow and Jones (2019) quantify the size of the gains from individuals going to the jobs they are best suited for, and estimate that 44% of US economic growth between 1960 and 2010 was due to better matching of workers and jobs.

=== Economic growth in East Asia ===
Hsieh's career began with studying the economic growth of China and East Asia. In “What Explains the Industrial Revolution in East Asia?” he argues – contra Alwyn Young and Paul Krugman – that the increase in economic growth in East Asian countries like Singapore was not merely the result of marshalling more resources and working longer hours, without an increase in total factor productivity. While much more capital was employed than ever before, the marginal product of capital stayed the same, which would not occur if the growth was purely "catchup growth" as predicted by a Solow model. In Hsieh's view, technological growth was being masked as capital accumulation.

Hsieh has since written articles on China, estimating the return to capital, exploring the causes of growth in China by sector, re-estimating national growth statistics to take into account misrepresentation by local governments, and estimating the effects of privatization on total factor productivity.

=== Education ===
A sub-theme of his work has been measuring schooling, human capital, and its effect on the labor market. His analysis of Chile's school choice program (with Miguel Urquiola) found no evidence that it improved academic outcomes, while a study of magnet schools in China found that better schools improved college entrance scores.

== Awards and honors ==
In 2012, Hsieh has been an elected member of the Academia Sinica, Taiwan's national academy. In 2023, he was elected to the American Academy of Arts and Sciences.

Hsieh is a member of the National Bureau of Economic Research (NBER), and was elected a fellow of the Econometric Society in 2022.
