= Jones model =

The Jones model (also known as the semi-endogenous growth model) is a growth model developed in 1995 by economist Charles I. Jones.

The model builds on the Romer model (1990), and in particular it generalizes or modifies the description of how new technologies, ideas, or design instructions arise by taking into account the criticism of the Romer model that the long-term growth rate depends positively on the size of the population (economies of scale). This is problematic because empirically larger countries have not necessarily grown faster than smaller ones; and as total human population increased during the 20th century, growth did not speed up. Furthermore, the extent of influence from the current state of knowledge on new inventions (standing on shoulders effect).

== Model Structure ==
For a single company i According to the following modeling applies to the emergence of new ideas or design instructions:

$$\dot A_i = \delta \cdot A(t)^\phi \cdot L_A(t)^{\lambda-1} \cdot L_{A_i}(t)$$

With

$L_{A}$:: Number of employees in the research sector

$A$: Technology level

$\dot A$ refers to the derivative of $A$ with respect to time: $\dot A= \frac{\partial A(t)}{\partial t}$

where the parameters take the following values: $0 < \lambda < 1; \phi < 1$. Parameter values of $\lambda = \phi = 1$ result in the Romer model ($\dot A = \delta \cdot A \cdot L_A$). After aggregation across all companies:

$$\dot A = \delta \cdot A(t)^\phi \cdot L_A(t)^{\lambda}$$.

Here the parameters have the following meaning:

- $\lambda$ restricts the effect of additional labor input in the research sector. Although more researchers are producing more ideas, each researcher is contributing less and less. This relationship is also called standing-on-shoes effect (step on your feet, see also yield law). This parameter reflects a possible negative externality of the duplication. For a single company, however, this problem does not exist because, within a research department, all researchers know about the work of their colleagues.
- $\phi < 0$: A negative value aims at giving only finitely many potential new ideas for a given time. This case is also referred to as a fishing-out effect: over time, the relatively "simple" inventions are made first; Today, it is becoming increasingly difficult to develop a new drug.
- $\phi = 0$: Here, productivity in the research sector would be independent of existing knowledge. For example, a physicist should be able to develop the same new ideas, whether he lives today or 100 years ago (an unrealistic case).
- $\phi > 0$: Describes in principle a positive externality and the case encountered in reality. The current state of the art is to a certain extent involved in research. The standing-on-shoulders effect is only weakened compared to the Romer model.

== Growth rate ==
In the Jones model, growth in steady state is given by:

$\frac{\dot{\hat{A(t)}}}{\hat{A(t)}} = 0 \quad \Leftrightarrow \quad \hat{A(t)} = \frac{\lambda \cdot n}{1 - \phi}$ n for the growth rate of persons working in the research sector.

== Links ==
- Jones model - Article in the Gabler Wirtschaftslexikon.
