= More Neighbours Toronto =

Housing advocacy group

More Neighbours Toronto is a Toronto-based housing advocacy organisation affiliated with the YIMBY ("Yes In My Backyard") movement. The organisation supports policies that would increase the supply of housing in Toronto.

== Organisation and activities ==
More Neighbours Toronto has over 200 active volunteers and drafts policy recommendations, such as city policy on garden suites. The group also submits deputations to the city, including on matters such as "modular supportive housing development". Additionally, the group submits deputations to the provincial government.

The organisation attends public consultation meetings in an effort to advocate for increased housing development in Toronto. It is a registered third party advertiser in Toronto elections. More Neighbours Toronto has endorsed candidates for city council, and was the target of attack ads. Its ranking of party housing policy was profiled in the media for the 2025 provincial elections. Its founder ran for the leadership of the Ontario Liberal Party. More Neighbours also co-published a "Citizen Developer's Guide" to advocate for more housing.

== Recognition ==
It was consulted by the Government of Ontario's 2021 Ontario Housing Affordability Task Force. With the Toronto Region Board of Trade, More Neighbours hosted a public consultation on the task force report at the University of Toronto's School of Cities. Panellists were the task force chair, Jake Lawrence, Bank of Nova Scotia, Tim Hudak, CEO of the Ontario Real Estate Association and Ene Underwood, CEO of Habitat for Humanity Greater Toronto Area.

It was part of the City of Toronto's & Canadian Urban Institute roundtable on Expanding Housing Options in Neighbourhoods. It was cited in a C. D. Howe Institute report on housing.

It has been cited by The Globe and Mail's editorial board and its representatives have published op-eds in the Globe. It is regularly consulted by media across the political spectrum in segments on housing including a segment where More Neighbours was cited to contrast with the Premier of Ontario.

The leader of the official opposition, Andrea Horwath stated, "Thanks More Neighbours, for your leadership and advocacy!" More Neighbours has also collaborated with Greenpac and other civic groups to host debates in provincial & mayoral elections. More Neighbours has also been covered in Quebec.
