= Livable California =

American anti-development group

Livable California is a NIMBY group in California known for advocating against increased housing supply and for local control. The organization disputes the existence of the California housing shortage.

Livable California was founded in 2018 by Marin County-based activist and former teacher Susan Kirsch and former oil and gas executive Rick Hall of San Francisco. They organized in opposition to Senator Scott Wiener’s housing development bill SB 827, helping to defeat it. The group also opposed subsequent iterations of the bill, such as SB 50, which would permit fourplexes in most neighborhoods exclusively zoned for single-family housing and mid-rises near public transit stations.

Susan Kirsch started her anti-housing activism when she successfully prevented a 20-unit apartment building in her neighborhood. Kirsch self-describes as a proponent for "slow growth", and disputes that California is experiencing a housing crisis. Other members of Livable California describe themselves as proponents for "sensible" development, "smart growth" or "preservationists". What unifies Livable California members is opposition to high-density housing development and support for single-family-exclusive zoning.

Susan Kirsch left the board of Livable California in 2019.
