= Drawbridge mentality =

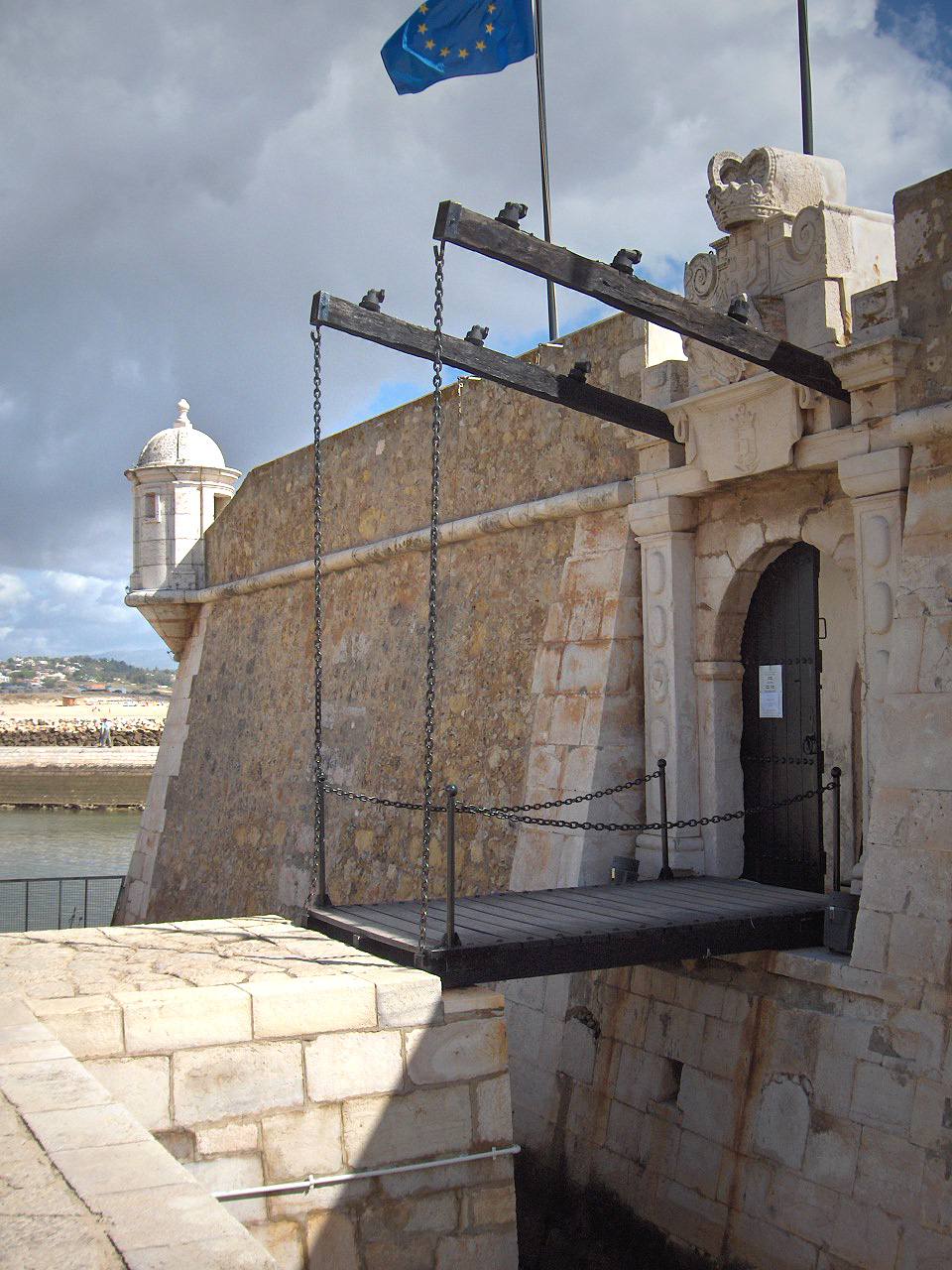
Drawbridge in Lagos, Portugal

Drawbridge mentality, also known as fortress mentality, is a conservative and anti-immigrant attitude of prior immigrants in an established community. Drawbridge mentality can encompass denying immigration to people, businesses and also denying building developments which could facilitate immigration, such as affordable housing. The conflict of drawbridge mentality often emerges between city councils which wish to expand, and residents concerned about losing property value or other economic or political assets.

It is often unclear whether the intention of certain policies is to achieve a drawbridge mentality, or if the policies have other economic or political goals. For example, impact fees reduce immigration by raising entry costs, but can also be argued to offset lowering property taxes. The drawbridge mentality can allow governments or communities to avoid providing humanitarian aid to immigrants by denying responsibility entirely.

The term can imply a selfish attitude and can be taken as an insult, and it often overlaps with the Not in My Back Yard attitude. The drawbridge mentality is one of many ways in which residents can respond to change, viewed as conservatively preserving the existing status quo.

There are many different reasons for immigration, for example due to ecological collapse by droughts and famine caused by physical and climate changes, floods, cyclones, and other natural disasters. There are also other economic and political factors motivating immigration. However, drawbridge mentality not generally concerned about the reason for immigration. Instead, the main focus is on social and economic effects of immigration like the changing urban density, property values, predominant lifestyles and cultures, and whether these changes are desirable for existing residents.

== Examples ==
=== Eli Home in Anaheim Hills, California ===
Eli Home, a nonprofit organisation founded in the 1980s which maintains homeless shelters for abused children, tried to expand to Anaheim Hills in 1994. The organisation was endorsed and praised by former United States presidents George W. Bush and Bill Clinton, but Anaheim Hills community residents were strongly opposed to the decision, and tried to stop the development. The Not in My Back Yard attitude was the main reasoning for the opposition, suggesting that the shelter will increase crime rates and make neighborhoods less friendly. The development was nonetheless approved by the council and later led to an exodus of Anaheim Hills residents. Since then, Eli Home as an organisation claims to serve over 1,000 abused children and their families annually, and also expanded services to drug rehabilitation, although the organisation had low donations in the decades since.

=== Acton, Massachusetts ===
In 2020, the Housing Production Plan for Acton, Massachusetts was released by the Massachusetts Department of Housing and Community Development, which detailed the methods to achieve at least 10% of its housing be designated 'affordable' as according to legislation set in 2008. Boston, which Acton is a suburb of, experiences significant racial disparity due to redlining, an issue reported to have gradually increased since the late 1960s. Negative racial stereotypes have been used to justify these redlining practices, but in the case of Acton it is believed these policies are mainly motivated by "the indifference of average citizens" and that the drawbridge mentality is considered a rational response to maintain property value. In this perspective, it is unclear whether the drawbridge mentality was an unintended effect of maintaining property value or nature preservation, or if isolating the community from immigrants was the primary goal.

== See also ==
- Lifeboat ethics, the moral dilemma which the drawbridge mentality seeks to resolve
