= Pantheon Systems =

Computer software company in California, US

Pantheon Systems, Inc.
- Type: Private
- Industry: Computer software
- Founded: 2010; 16 years ago
- Founders: Zack Rosen; David Strauss; Josh Koenig; Matt Cheney
- Headquarters: San Francisco, California, U.S.
- Area served: Worldwide
- Key people: Bill Ingram (Interim CEO); Bill Ingram (Interim CFO); David Strauss (CTO)
- Products: Pantheon Platform
- Number of employees: 378+ (June 2021)
- Website: pantheon.io

Pantheon Systems, Inc. is a privately held San Francisco-based corporation founded in 2010.

The company's flagship service, Pantheon, is a WebOps platform for websites powered by open-source Drupal and WordPress CMS, as well as NextJS and GatsbyJS Jamstack front-ends. It is an app-specific PaaS provider. Technologically, Pantheon applications run as software-as-a-service instead of running on users' own servers. Pantheon's service is built on top of Google Cloud Platform.

== History ==
=== Founding and launch ===
Pantheon Systems, Inc. was founded in 2010 in San Francisco by Zack Rosen, David Strauss, Josh Koenig and Matt Cheney, and raised a $1.3 million seed round. The platform launched publicly in September 2011 as a hosting and development service for Drupal websites. It subsequently raised $5 million Series A financing from Foundry Group, with previous investors being Baseline Ventures, First Round Capital, Floodgate, and Founders Collective, bringing the total amount to $6.3 million.

Unlike hosting providers that ran each site on a virtual machine, Pantheon built its platform on a container-based architecture, together with a custom network-backed filesystem named Valhalla, which the company said allowed it to scale capacity up and down more quickly.

=== Expansion ===
In March 2014, Pantheon extended the platform beyond Drupal to support WordPress sites. Rosen said the change took the team a little over a month to implement because most of the existing infrastructure could be reused, and that the company had moved into WordPress as the CMS gained ground with marketing departments and larger organisations.

In 2014, Pantheon raised $21.5 million in Series B financing led by Scale Venture Partners (ScaleVP) with participation from OpenView Partners and existing investors Foundry Group and First Round Capital. As part of the funding round, Rory O'Driscoll, Partner at ScaleVP, joined the board of directors.

In September 2015, the company launched Pantheon Enterprise, a tier aimed at large organisations priced at $10,000 per year. It added SAML single sign-on, a dashboard for managing multiple sites, role-based change management and a service-level agreement.

In 2016, Pantheon announced that it had raised a $29 million Series C round. Investors in this round included previous investors Foundry Group, OpenView Investment Partners and Scale Venture Partners, as well as new investor Industry Ventures, which put $8.5 million into the round. The round followed Pantheon's $21.5 million Series B round in 2014 and brought the company's total funding to $57 million.

In January 2018, Pantheon migrated its platform to Google Cloud Platform.

In 2019, Sageview Capital led a Series D funding round of $40 million, bringing total funding to over $100 million.

In July 2021, Pantheon raised $100 million in Series E funding from the SoftBank Vision Fund, at a valuation of over $1 billion.

=== Leadership change ===
In May 2024, co-founder Zack Rosen stepped down as chief executive after more than a decade in the role, remaining involved with the company. Board director Bill Ingram was named interim CEO while a permanent successor was sought.

=== Hosting of hate group websites ===
In April 2023, Pantheon was criticized by open source developers for hosting the websites of organizations that have been designated as hate groups by the Southern Poverty Law Center for their anti-LGBT stances and their "ties to white supremacist groups and eugenicists". Koenig confirmed in a statement that Pantheon would continue to host the organizations' websites.

In an October 2023 open letter, Koenig said, "we are marking new boundaries with a Prohibited Customers policy. We are setting standards that will, for instance, help us avoid taking on Southern Poverty Law Center-designated hate groups as customers."

== Features ==
Pantheon is a combination of web development tools in the cloud and web hosting and management services. It is based in the cloud, and is free until deployment. Developers have a choice between Drupal and WordPress and installation of profiles like Open Atrium, or custom upstreams with user-specified configuration. Data can be imported onto Pantheon automatically from existing Drupal-based websites. Its container-based architecture allows for multiple development environments of a single website.
