= Kenneth Judd =

American economist (born 1953)

- Born: March 24, 1953 (age 73)

Academic background
- Alma mater: University of Wisconsin
- Doctoral advisor: Kenneth Burdett

Academic work
- Discipline: Computational economics
- Institutions: Stanford University
- Website: Information at IDEAS / RePEc

Kenneth Lewis Judd (born March 24, 1953) is a computational economist at Stanford University, where he is the Paul H. Bauer Senior Fellow at the Hoover Institution. He received his PhD in economics from the University of Wisconsin in 1980. He is perhaps best known as the author of Numerical Methods in Economics, and he is also among the editors of the Handbook of Computational Economics and of the Journal of Economic Dynamics and Control.

He is one of two authors behind the Chamley–Judd result that the optimal tax rate on capital income is zero.
