= Mark Bils =

American economist (born 1958)

- Born: 1958 (age 67–68)

Academic background
- Education: MIT, Ohio State University
- Doctoral advisor: Stanley Fischer

Mark Bils (December 1, 1958) is a macroeconomist at the University of Rochester. Bils obtained his PhD in economics from MIT in 1985 and BA in economics from Ohio State University in 1979. He has taught at the University of Chicago GSB and is currently professor and chair of the Department of Economics at the University of Rochester.

In 1987, Bils published The Cyclical Behavior of Marginal Cost and Price in the American Economic Review where he argued that marginal cost is procyclical. This is driven from the counterintuitive fact that employment is high when wages are high. Thus, Bils argues, an increase untrained labor must increase marginal costs (in the same way an increase in demand increases wages). He is in the top 5% of most cited economists.

== Selected publications ==
- "How Sticky Wages In Existing Jobs Can Affect Hiring" (with Yongsung Chang and Sun-Bin Kim), Manuscript, January 2014
- "Has Consumption Inequality Mirrored Income Inequality?" (with Mark Aguiar), Manuscript, December 2013
- "Testing for Keynesian Labor Demand" (with Pete Klenow and Benjamin Malin), NBER Macroeconomics Annual, January 2013
- "Reset Price Inflation and the Impact of Monetary Policy Shocks" (with Pete Klenow and Benjamin Malin), American Economic Review, October 2012
- "Comparative Advantage and Unemployment" (with Yongsung Chang and Sun-Bin Kim), Journal of Monetary Economics, March 2012
- "Worker Heterogeneity and Endogenous Separations in a Matching Model of Unemployment Fluctuations" (with Yongsung Chang and Sun-Bin Kim), American Economic Journal of Macroeconomics, January 2011
- "Do Higher Prices for New Goods Reflect Quality Growth or Inflation?", Quarterly Journal of Economics, May 2009
- "Studying Price Markups from Stockout Behavior", Manuscript, December 2004
- "Some Evidence on the Importance of Sticky Prices" (with Pete Klenow), Journal of Political Economy, October 2004
- "Quantifying Quality Growth" (with Pete Klenow), American Economic Review, September 2001
- "Does Schooling Cause Growth" (with Pete Klenow), American Economic Review, December 2000
- "What Inventory Behavior Tells Us about Business Cycles" (with James Kahn), American Economic Review, June 2000
- "Deducing Markups from Stockout Behavior,"Research in Economics, June 2016"
