= Enrico Moretti =

Economist

- Born: 1968; Milan, Italy

Academic background
- Education: Laurea (1993), Bocconi University; Ph.D. (2000), University of California, Berkeley

Academic work
- Discipline: Labor economics Urban economics
- Institutions: University of California, Berkeley
- Awards: Fellow, European Association of Labour Economists since 2019 Fellow of the Econometric Society since 2016 Sherwin Rosen Prize for Outstanding Contributions in the Field of Labor Economics, awarded by the Society of Labor Economists Fellow, Society of Labor Economists since 2014 William Bowen Prize Carlo Alberto Medal, awarded to an Italian economist under the age of 40 for his/her outstanding research contributions to the field of economics
- Website: eml.berkeley.edu//~moretti/

Enrico Moretti is an Italian economist and the Michael Peevey and Donald Vial Professor of Economics at the University of California, Berkeley. He is also a research associate at the National Bureau of Economic Research (Cambridge), and a research fellow at the Centre for Economic Policy Research (London) and the Institute for the Study of Labor (Bonn). Prior to joining the Berkeley faculty in 2004, he has taught at UCLA.

His research covers the fields of labor economics and urban economics. He has received several awards and honors, including the Society of Labor Economists’ Rosen Prize for outstanding contributions to labor economics, the Carlo Alberto Medal, the IZA Young Labor Economist Award, and a Fulbright Fellowship. He is an elected Fellow of the Econometric Society, the Society of Labor Economists and the European Association of Labour Economists. Between 2015 and 2020 he was the editor-in-chief of the Journal of Economic Perspectives.

Along with over 70 articles in peer-reviewed economics journals, Moretti's 2012 book for general audiences, The New Geography of Jobs, has received widespread attention. The book was awarded the William Bowen Prize by Princeton University for the most important contribution toward understanding public policy and the labor market.

In addition to his work in labor economics and economic geography, Moretti has published peer-reviewed articles on the social returns to education; social interactions and peer effects; health economics; political economy; and the economics of the family.

== Selected bibliography ==
- “The Effect of High-Tech Clusters on the Productivity of Top Inventors” American Economic Review, 111(10), 2021
- “Housing Constraints and Spatial Misallocation (with C. Hsieh), American Economic Journal: Macroeconomics 11 (2), 2019
- “The Effect of State Taxes on the Geographical Location of Top Earners: Evidence from Star Scientists” (with D. Wilson), American Economic Review, 107(7), 2017.
- “Local Economic Development, Agglomeration Economies and the Big Push: 100 Years of Evidence from the Tennessee Valley Authority" (with P. Kline), Quarterly Journal of Economics, 129(1), 2014.
- “Real Wage Inequality" American Economic Journal: Applied Economics, 5 (1), 2013. Best Paper Prize - American Economic Journal: Applied Economics
- “Local Labor Markets”, in Handbook of Labor Economics, Elsevier, 2011.
- "Identifying Agglomeration Spillovers: Evidence from Winners and Losers of Large Plant Openings" (with M. Greenstone and R. Hornbeck), Journal of Political Economy, 118(3), 2010.
- "Peers at Work" (with A. Mas), American Economic Review, 99(1), 2009
- "The Demand for Sons" (with G. Dahl), Review of Economic Studies, 75(4), 2008
- "Workers' Education, Spillovers and Productivity: Evidence from Plant-Level Production Functions", American Economic Review 94(3), 2004
- "Estimating the Social Return to Higher Education: Evidence From Longitudinal and Repeated Cross-Sectional Data", Journal of Econometrics 121(1–2), 2004
- "The Effect of Education on Criminal Activity: Evidence from Prison Inmates, Arrests and Self-Reports" (with L. Lochner), American Economic Review 94(1), 2004
- Mother's Education and the Intergenerational Transmission of Human Capital: Evidence from College Openings (with J. Currie), Quarterly Journal of Economics, 118(4), 2003.
