= Yglesias =

Yglesias is a surname. Notable people with the surname include:

- The Yglesias literary and journalistic family
  - Helen Yglesias (née Bassine) (1915–2008), American novelist, wife of Jose
  - Jose Yglesias (1919–1995), American novelist, husband of Helen
  - Rafael Yglesias (born 1954), American novelist and screenwriter, son of Jose and Helen
  - Matthew Yglesias (born 1981), American journalist, son of Rafael
- Rafael Yglesias Castro (1861–1924), Costa Rican politician

== See also ==
- Iglesias (surname)
