= 2026 United States elections polling =

These are the pre-election polling results of the 2026 United States elections.

== 2025–2026 ==
Poll source	Date(s) administered	Sample size (Note: Key: A – all adults RV – registered voters LV – likely voters)	Margin of error	Democratic	Republican	Other/ Undecided	Lead
John Zogby Strategies	November 1–2, 2026	1,001 (LV)	± 3.2%	53%	47%	—	6%
Reuters/Ipsos	October 28 – November 2, 2026	1,212 (LV)	± 2.9%	52%	44%	4% (Note: "Candidate from another political party" with 3%; "Skipped" with 1%)	8%
Reuters/Ipsos	October 28 – November 2, 2026	1,357 (RV)	± 2.7%	49%	42%	9% (Note: "Will not/do not plan to vote" with 5%; "Candidate from another political party" & "Skipped" with 2%)	7%
Focaldata/Financial Times	October 30 – November 1, 2026	2,090 (LV)	± 2.7%	52%	45%	3% (Note: "Other" with 3%)	7%
Focaldata/Financial Times	October 30 – November 1, 2026	2,163 (RV)	± 2.5%	50%	43%	8% (Note: "I would not vote" & "Other" with 4%)	7%
Focaldata/Financial Times	October 30 – November 1, 2026	2,444 (A)	± 2.4%	47%	41%	12% (Note: "I would not vote" with 8%; "Other" with 4%)	6%
AtlasIntel	October 28 – November 1, 2026	3,566 (LV)	± 2.0%	56%	41%	3% (Note: "Would not vote" with 1%)	15%
Hart Research Associates (D)/Public Opinion Strategies (R) (Note: Poll conducted for NBC News)	October 28–30, 2026	1,000 (RV)	± 3.1%	52%	45%	3%	7%
YouGov	October 27–30, 2026	3,915 (LV)	± 1.7%	53%	44%	3% (Note: "Someone else" with 2%; "I [did/will/would] not vote for U.S. House of Representatives" with 1%)	9%
Big Data Poll	October 27–30, 2026	3,214 (LV)	± 1.7%	51%	39%	11% (Note: "Someone else/third party" with 5%)	12%
Big Data Poll	October 27–30, 2026	3,418 (RV)	± 1.8%	50%	38%	13% (Note: "Someone else/third party" with 5%)	12%
I&I/TIPP Insights (R)	October 27–30, 2026	1,158 (LV)	± 2.9%	52%	42%	5%	10%
ActiVote	October 22–30, 2026	2,000 (LV)	± 2.2%	53.5%	46.5%	6%	7%
Rasmussen Reports (R)	October 22–28, 2026	1,442 (LV)	± 2.0%	49%	43%	8% (Note: "Some other candidate" with 5%)	6%
Ipsos	October 20–28, 2026	1,209 (LV)	± 3.5%	50%	44%	6%	6%
Tufts University/YouGov	October 23–27, 2026	499 (LV)	± 4.6%	52%	40%	8% (Note: "Other" with 3%)	12%
Tufts University/YouGov	October 23–27, 2026	1,000 (A)	± 3.6%	47%	36%	17%	11%
Emerson College	October 24–26, 2026	1,000 (LV)	± 3.0%	52%	42%	5%	10%
Harvard/Harris Poll/HarrisX	October 24–26, 2026	(LV)	–	52%	48%	–	4%
The Economist/YouGov	October 23–26, 2026	1,123 (LV)	–	52% (Note: Strict likely voters)	41%	8% (Note: "Other" with 3%; "I will not vote" with 1%)	11%
The Economist/YouGov	October 23–26, 2026	1,263 (LV)	–	50% (Note: Loose likely voters)	41%	9%	9%
The Economist/YouGov	October 23–26, 2026	1,430 (RV)	–	46%	40%	14% (Note: "I will not vote" with 6%; "Other" with 2%)	6%
Reuters/Ipsos	October 22–26, 2026	1,164 (LV)	± 2.9%	53% (Note: With voters who lean towards a given candidate)	44%	4% (Note: "Candidate from another political party" & "Skipped" with 2%)	9%
Reuters/Ipsos	October 22–26, 2026	1,280 (RV)	± 2.8%	50%	41%	9% (Note: "Candidate from another political party", "Skipped" & "Will not/do not plan to vote" with 3%)	9%
NPR/PBS/Marist University	October 19–26, 2026	(LV)	± 3.8%	52%	44%	5% (Note: "Another party's candidate" & "No response" with 2%)	8%
NPR/PBS/Marist University	October 19–26, 2026	1,289 (RV)	± 3.7%	52%	42%	6% (Note: "No response" with 3%; "Another party's candidate" with 2%)	10%
Cygnal (R)	October 23–24, 2026	1,500 (LV)	± 2.5%	52%	43%	5%	8%
CBS/YouGov	October 21–23, 2026	1,749 (LV)	—	53%	45%	1% (Note: "Other" with 1%)	8%
Echelon Insights (Note: Poll sponsored by NetChoice)	October 16–23, 2026	3,644 (LV)	± 3.2%	51%	46%	3%	5%
Prolific	October 21–22, 2026	713 (LV)	—	53%	42%	5% (Note: "I would not vote" and "Other" with 2%)	11%
Prolific	October 21–22, 2026	1,118 (RV)	—	50%	40%	10% (Note: "I would not vote" with 5%; "Other" with 3%)	10%
Targoz Market Research	October 20–22, 2026	1,118 (LV)	—	49%	46%	4% (Note: "Another candidate" with 1%)	3%
Clarity Campaign Labs	October 15–21, 2026	1,016 (LV)	± 3.1%	52%	44%	5%	8%
ActiVote	October 15–21, 2026	1,000 (LV)	± 3.1%	53%	47%	–	6%
Rasmussen Reports (R)	October 15–21, 2026	1,755 (LV)	± 2.0%	48%	43%	9% (Note: "Some other candidate" with 4%)	5%
The Economist/YouGov	October 19–20, 2026	1,179 (LV)	–	52%	43%	6%	9%
The Economist/YouGov	October 19–20, 2026	1,312 (LV)	–	50%	43%	7% (Note: "Other" with 2%; "I will not vote" with 1%)	7%
The Economist/YouGov	October 19–20, 2026	1,496 (RV)	–	45%	40%	14% (Note: "I will not vote" with 6%; "Other" with 2%)	5%
Focaldata/Financial Times	October 16–20, 2026	1,594 (LV)	± 3.0%	53%	44%	3%	9%
Focaldata/Financial Times	October 16–20, 2026	1,648 (RV)	± 2.8%	51%	41%	8% (Note: "I will not vote" & "Other" with 4%)	10%
Focaldata/Financial Times	October 16–20, 2026	1,845 (A)	± 2.6%	49%	40%	11% (Note: "I will not vote" with 7%; "Other" with 4%)	9%
Pennsylvania State University/YouGov	October 14–20, 2026	724 (LV)	± 4.4%	47%	43%	10% (Note: "Third party candidate" with 2%)	4%
The Rainey Center	October 14–20, 2026	1,279 (RV)	± 3.6%	52%	44%	4% (Note: "I would not vote" with 2%)	8%
Morning Consult (Note: Poll sponsored by Deseret News & the Hinckley Institute of Politics)	October 13–20, 2026	2,050 (RV)	± 2.0%	48%	42%	10%	6%
Reuters/Ipsos	October 16–19, 2026	1,279 (RV)	± 2.9%	47%	35%	19% (Note: "Will not/do not plan to vote" with 4%; "Candidate from another political party" with 3%; "Skipped" with 1%)	12%
Reuters/Ipsos	October 16–19, 2026	1,679 (A)	± 2.8%	40%	29%	31% (Note: "Will not/do not plan to vote" with 15%; "Candidate from another political party" with 3%; "Skipped" with 1%)	11%
The New York Times/Siena University	October 12–19, 2026	3,494 (LV)	± 1.9%	52%	41%	7% (Note: "The third-party candidate" with <1%)	11%
The New York Times/Siena University	October 12–19, 2026	3,494 (RV)	± 1.9%	51%	39%	10%	12%
CNN/SSRS	October 15–18, 2026	1,206 (RV)	± 3.3%	49%	39%	11% (Note: "Neither" with 8%; "Do not plan to vote" with 2%; "Other" with 1%; "No opinion" with >0.5%)	10%
Hart Research Associates (D)/Public Opinion Strategies (R) (Note: Poll conducted for CNBC)	October 14–18, 2026	1,000 (RV)	± 3.1%	52%	45%	3%	7%
RMG Research (Note: Poll sponsored by Napolitan News Service)	October 13–14, 2026	2,000 (RV)	± 2.2%	51%	43%	6%	8%
Rasmussen Reports (R)	October 8–14, 2026	1,789 (LV)	± 2.0%	48%	44%	8% (Note: "Some other candidate" with 2%)	4%
ActiVote	October 4–14, 2026	1,000 (LV)	± 3.1%	53%	47%	–	6%
The Washington Post/ABC News/Ipsos	October 9–13, 2026	2,032 (LV)	± 2.2%	52%	44%	4% (Note: "Would not vote" with 3%)	8%
The Economist/YouGov	October 10–12, 2026	1,403 (RV)	± 3.5%	46%	39%	15% (Note: "I will not vote" with 5%; "Other" with 2%)	7%
Beacon Research (D)/ Shaw & Co. Research (R) (Note: Poll conducted for Fox News)	October 9–12, 2026	1,202 (RV)	± 2.5%	54%	45%	1%	9%
SurveyMonkey (Note: Poll conducted for NBC News Decision Desk)	September 28 – October 12, 2026	17,649 (RV)	± 1.6%	55%	45%	–	10%
Morning Consult	October 5–11, 2026	17,654 (LV)	± 1.0%	50%	43%	7%	7%
Cygnal (R)	October 7–10, 2026	1,500 (LV)	± 2.5%	51%	42%	7%	9%
TrueDot (Note: Poll conducted for NewsNation and Decision Desk HQ)	October 5–9, 2026	974 (LV)	± 3.2%	49%	42%	8%	7%
Rasmussen Reports (R)	October 1–7, 2026	1,781 (LV)	± 2.0%	49%	44%	7%	5%
Focaldata/Financial Times	October 2–5, 2026	2,201 (LV)	–	52%	44%	4% (Note: "Other" with 4%)	8%
The Economist/YouGov	October 2–5, 2026	995 (LV)	–	52%	40%	8%	12%
The Economist/YouGov	October 2–5, 2026	1,173 (LV)	–	51%	40%	9%	11%
Reuters/Ipsos	September 30 – October 5, 2026	3,526 (RV)	± 1.7%	44%	37%	19% (Note: "Will not/do not plan to vote" with 4%; "Candidate from another political party" with 2%)	7%
Reuters/Ipsos	September 30 – October 5, 2026	4,506 (A)	± 1.5%	37%	30%	33% (Note: "Will not/do not plan to vote" with 16%; "Candidate from another political party" with 2%; "Skipped" with 1%)	7%
University of Massachusetts Lowell/YouGov	October 2–4, 2026	1,000 (LV)	± 3.84%	52%	43%	6% (Note: "Another candidate" & "I would not vote" with 1%)	9%
Morning Consult	September 28 – October 4, 2026	17,659 (LV)	± 0.9%	50%	43%	7%	7%
Pew Research Center	September 28 – October 4, 2026	3,917 (RV)	± 1.8%	44%	36%	20% (Note: "Another candidate" with 5%)	8%
Cygnal (R)	October 1–2, 2026	1,500 (LV)	± 2.53%	52%	43%	6%	9%
CBS News/YouGov	September 30 – October 2, 2026	1,572 (LV)	—	54%	45%	—	9%
ActiVote	September 22 – October 2, 2026	1,000 (LV)	± 4.4%	52%	48%	–	4%
I&I/TIPP Insights (R)	September 29 – October 1, 2026	1,328 (RV)	± 2.8%	46%	42%	12%	4%
Centerline Research & Strategy	September 26 – October 1, 2026	930 (LV)	± 3.8%	50%	42%	8%	8%
Rasmussen Reports (R)	September 24–30, 2026	1,794 (LV)	± 2.0%	47%	44%	9%	3%
Harvard/Harris Poll/HarrisX	September 26–28, 2026	2,200 (RV)	± 2.1%	50%	50%	—	Tie
Harvard/Harris Poll/HarrisX	September 26–28, 2026	— (LV)	—	51%	49%	—	2%
AlphaROC (Note: Poll conducted for The Independent Center)	September 25–28, 2026	1,000 (A)	± 3.1%	43%	37%	20% (Note: "An independent or third-party candidate" with 6%)	6%
The Economist/YouGov	September 25–28, 2026	1,003 (LV)	—	53%	38%	9%	15%
The Economist/YouGov	September 25–28, 2026	1,423 (RV)	± 3.4%	45%	37%	18%	8%
Quinnipiac University	September 24–27, 2026	1,032 (RV)	± 3.8%	51%	39%	10%	12%
Morning Consult	September 21–27, 2026	18,786 (LV)	± 0.9%	50%	43%	7%	7%
Angus Reid Global	September 19–25, 2026	919 (RV)	—	56%	40%	4%	16%
Angus Reid Global	September 19–25, 2026	1,041 (RV)	—	49%	35%	16% (Note: "Would not vote" with 5%; "Another party's candidate" with 4%)	14%
Angus Reid Global	September 19–25, 2026	1,205 (A)	± 2.5%	45%	34%	21% (Note: "Would not vote" with 10%; "Another party's candidate" with 7%)	11%
GBAO (D) (Note: Poll conducted for Third Way)	September 17–24, 2026	2,000 (RV)	–	50%	41%	10% (Note: "Other" with 1%)	9%
Change Research (D)	September 15–24, 2026	2,021 (RV)	± 2.3%	46%	39%	15%	7%
Rasmussen Reports (R)	September 17–23, 2026	1,819 (LV)	± 2.0%	48%	43%	9%	5%
Emerson College	September 21–22, 2026	1,000 (LV)	± 3.0%	53%	42%	5%	11%
The Argument/Verasight	September 16–22, 2026	— (LV)	—	55%	45%	—	10%
The Argument/Verasight	September 16–22, 2026	— (LV)	—	50%	41%	9%	9%
The Argument/Verasight	September 16–22, 2026	1,603 (RV)	± 2.7%	53%	47%	—	6%
The Argument/Verasight	September 16–22, 2026	1,603 (RV)	± 2.7%	48%	41%	11%	7%
McLaughlin & Associates (R)	September 16–22, 2026	1,000 (LV)	± 3.0%	48%	43%	9%	5%
The Economist/YouGov	September 18–21, 2026	975 (LV)	—	52%	38%	10% (Note: "Other" with 2%)	14%
The Economist/YouGov	September 18–21, 2026	1,394 (RV)	± 3.4%	45%	36%	18% (Note: "Other" and "I would not vote" with 3%)	9%
Echelon Insights	September 17–21, 2026	1,002 (LV)	± 3.6%	51%	43%	6%	8%
Strength In Numbers/Verasight	September 16–21, 2026	— (LV)	—	52%	42%	6%	10%
Strength In Numbers/Verasight	September 16–21, 2026	1,374 (RV)	—	50%	42%	8%	8%
Strength In Numbers/Verasight	September 16–21, 2026	1,528 (A)	± 2.6%	49%	41%	10%	8%
Impact Research (D)/ National Research Inc. (R) (Note: Poll conducted for The Wall Street Journal)	September 16–21, 2026	1,500 (RV)	± 2.5%	50%	42%	–	8%
KFF	September 16–21, 2026	1,013 (RV)	± 4.0%	45%	35%	21% (Note: "Neither/another party" with 6%; "I wouldn't vote" with 5%)	8%
ActiVote	September 11–21, 2026	1,000 (LV)	± 3.1%	53%	47%	–	6%
Morning Consult	September 18–20, 2026	18,336 (LV)	± 0.9%	50%	43%	7%	7%
Reuters/Ipsos	September 17–20, 2026	979 (RV)	± 3.2%	43%	35%	22% (Note: "Will not/do not plan to vote" with 5%; "Candidate from another political party" with 3%; "Skipped" with 1%)	8%
Reuters/Ipsos	September 17–20, 2026	1,277 (A)	± 2.8%	37%	29%	34%	8%
Quantus Insights (R)	September 15–18, 2026	1,389 (LV)	± 2.9%	50%	42%	8% (Note: "Another candidate" with 2%)	8%
CNN/SSRS	September 16–17, 2026	867 (RV)	± 4.1%	49%	41%	10%	8%
John Zogby Strategies	September 15–17, 2026	1,007 (LV)	± 3.2%	46%	40%	14% (Note: "Other party" with 4%)	6%
John Zogby Strategies	September 15–17, 2026	1,007 (LV)	± 3.2%	48%	42%	10% (Note: "Other party" with 5%)	6%
The Winston Group (R) (Note: Poll sponsored by Winning the Issues)	September 12–16, 2026	1,000 (RV)	± 3.0%	51%	42%	7%	9%
Clarity Campaign Labs (D)	September 11–16, 2026	1,046 (LV)	± 3.03%	50%	43%	8%	7%
Rasmussen Reports (R)	September 10–16, 2026	1,746 (LV)	± 2.0%	49%	41%	10%	8%
Marist University (Note: Poll sponsored by NPR and PBS News)	September 14–15, 2026	1,280 (RV)	± 3.8%	53%	41%	6% (Note: "Another Party's Candidate" with 2%; "No Response" with 1%)	12%
Big Data Poll (R)	September 13–15, 2026	2,633 (LV)	± 1.7%	48%	37%	15% (Note: "Someone else/third party" with 7%)	11%
Big Data Poll (R)	September 13–15, 2026	2,947 (RV)	± 1.8%	45%	36%	19% (Note: "Someone else/third party" with 8%)	9%
Emerson College/ RealClear Opinion Research (Note: Poll sponsored by the United America Institute)	September 12–15, 2026	1,500 (RV)	± 2.4%	37%	29%	35% (Note: "Independent/another candidate" with 10%; "Do not plan to vote" with 8%)	8%
Hart Research Associates (D)/ Public Opinion Strategies (R) (Note: Poll conducted for NBC News)	September 11–15, 2026	1,000 (RV)	± 3.1%	50%	45%	5%	5%
Morning Consult	September 10–15, 2026	2,102 (RV)	± 2.0%	46%	43%	11%	3%
RMG Research	September 8–15, 2026	2,000 (RV)	± 2.2%	51%	43%	6%	8%
Reuters/Ipsos	September 11–14, 2026	896 (RV)	± 3.4%	44%	37%	19%	7%
Reuters/Ipsos	September 11–14, 2026	1,143 (A)	± 3.0%	39%	31%	30%	8%
Beacon Research (D)/ Shaw & Co. Research (R)	September 11–14, 2026	1,211 (RV)	± 3.0%	51%	44%	5%	7%
The Economist/YouGov	September 11–14, 2026	1,051 (LV)	—	51%	39%	10% (Note: "I would not vote" with 3%; "Other" with 1%)	12%
The Economist/YouGov	September 11–14, 2026	1,455 (RV)	± 3.3%	44%	39%	17% (Note: "I would not vote" with 4%; "Other" with 3%)	5%
The Rainey Center	September 10–14, 2026	1,004 (RV)	± 4.9%	48%	42%	10% (Note: "I would not vote" with 5%)	6%
New York Times/Siena College	September 8–13, 2026	1,503 (LV)	± 2.9%	51%	43%	6%	8%
Morning Consult	September 7–13, 2026	— (LV)	—	49%	43%	8%	6%
CBS News/YouGov	September 8–11, 2026	1,750 (LV)	± 2.9%	54%	46%	–	8%
ActiVote	August 31 – September 10, 2026	1,000 (LV)	± 3.1%	52%	48%	–	4%
Catawba College/YouGov	September 4–9, 2026	779 (LV)	–	49%	38%	12%	11%
Catawba College/YouGov	September 4–9, 2026	1,201 (A)	± 3.6%	38%	28%	34% (Note: "Would not vote" with 19%; "Vote another candidate" with 1%)	10%
Rasmussen Reports (R)	September 3–9, 2026	1,905 (LV)	± 2.0%	47%	42%	11%	5%
Marquette University Law School	September 2–9, 2026	581 (LV)	± 4.3%	54%	41%	8% (Note: "Neither" with 4%)	13%
Marquette University Law School	September 2–9, 2026	864 (RV)	± 3.6%	50%	42%	8% (Note: "Neither" with 7%; "Would not vote" with 2%)	8%
Marquette University Law School	September 2–9, 2026	1,023 (A)	± 3.3%	48%	39%	13% (Note: "Neither" with 8%; "Would not vote" with 5%)	9%
The Economist/YouGov	September 4–8, 2026	1,015 (LV)	—	49%	38%	13%	11%
The Economist/YouGov	September 4–8, 2026	1,464 (RV)	± 3.4%	42%	35%	23%	7%
Morning Consult	September 4–6, 2026	2,203 (RV)	—	46%	42%	12%	4%
Public Religion Research Institute (Note: Poll conducted for the Andrew Carnegie Foundation, the Ford Foundation, and the Unitarian Universalist Veatch Program at Shelter Rock)	August 20 – September 7, 2026	(RV)	–	43%	36%	21% (Note: "Other/third-party candidate" with 3%)	7%
Public Religion Research Institute	August 20 – September 7, 2026	5,539 (A)	± 1.6%	36%	28%	35% (Note: "Would not vote" with 12%; "Other/third-party candidate" with 4%)	8%
Quinnipiac University	September 3–6, 2026	970 (RV)	± 3.9%	49%	38%	13%	11%
Cygnal (R)	September 1–2, 2026	1,500 (LV)	± 2.5%	51%	42%	7%	9%
Focaldata/Financial Times	August 28 – September 2, 2026	1,837 (LV)	–	52%	45%	3%	7%
Focaldata/Financial Times	August 28 – September 2, 2026	1,837 (RV)	–	51%	44%	5%	7%
Focaldata/Financial Times	August 28 – September 2, 2026	1,914 (RV)	–	49%	42%	9% (Note: "I would not vote" with 5%; "Other" with 4%)	7%
Focaldata/Financial Times	August 28 – September 2, 2026	2,178 (A)	–	46%	41%	13% (Note: "I would not vote" with 9%; "Other" with 4%)	5%
Reuters/Ipsos	August 28–31, 2026	924 (RV)	± 3.3%	43%	38%	19% (Note: "Will not/do not plan to vote" with 3%; "Candidate from another political party" with 2%)	5%
Reuters/Ipsos	August 28–31, 2026	1,167 (A)	± 2.9%	38%	31%	31% (Note: "Will not/do not plan to vote" with 13%; "Candidate from another political party" with 3%)	7%
Harvard/Harris Poll/HarrisX	August 28–30, 2026	2,100 (RV)	± 2.1%	51%	49%	–	2%
Harvard/Harris Poll/HarrisX	August 28–30, 2026	– (LV)	–	49%	51%	–	2%
Rasmussen Reports (R)	August 23–30, 2026	2,231 (LV)	± 2.0%	41%	36%	23% (Note: "Some other candidate" with 7%)	5%
UMass Amherst/YouGov	August 21–26, 2026	1,000 (A)	± 4.1%	42%	34%	14% (Note: "An Independent Candidate" with 10%)	8%
McLaughlin & Associates (R)	August 14–24, 2026	1,000 (LV)	–	48%	43%	9%	5%
ActiVote	August 10–24, 2026	1,000 (LV)	± 3.1%	52%	48%	–	4%
Emerson College	August 16–17, 2026	1,000 (LV)	± 3.0%	51%	43%	6%	8%
The Economist/YouGov	August 14–17, 2026	1,449 (RV)	± 3.2%	46%	39%	15% (Note: "I would not vote" with 2%; "Other" with 1%)	7%
The Economist/YouGov	August 14–17, 2026	1,610 (A)	± 3.2%	39%'	32%	29% (Note: "I would not vote" with 16%; "Other" with 1%)	7%
Reuters/Ipsos	August 14–17, 2026	876 (RV)	± 3.4%	41%	36%	23% (Note: "Candidate from another political party" with 5%; "Will not/do not plan to vote" with 4%)	5%
Reuters/Ipsos	August 14–17, 2026	1,166 (A)	± 2.9%	35%	30%	35% (Note: "Will not/do not plan to vote" with 14%; "Candidate from another political party" with 4%; "Skipped" with 1%)	5%
The Bullfinch Group	August 14–17, 2026	1,000 (RV)	± 3.1%	42%	37%	21% (Note: "Independent Candidate" with 10%)	5%
The Bullfinch Group	August 14–17, 2026	1,200 (A)	± 2.8%	45%	40%	15%	5%
Echelon Insights	August 13–17, 2026	1,002 (LV)	± 3.4%	50%	45%	5%	5%
Morning Consult/Cato Institute	August 13–16, 2026	4,150 (RV)	± 2.0%	47%	42%	11%	5%
Noble Predictive Insights/ The Center Square	August 12–16, 2026	2,533 (RV)	± 2.0%	47%	42%	11%	5%
Morning Consult	August 10–16, 2026	29,719 (RV)	± 0.6%	46%	42%	12%	4%
Angus Reid Global	August 8–11, 2026	1,525 (A)	± 2.0%	45%	36%	19% (Note: "Another party's candidate" with 3%; "Rather not say" with 3%)	9%
Wave Polling/Verasight	August 7–11, 2026	1,591 (RV)	± 3.0%	50%	43%	8% (Note: "Would not vote" with 4%)	8%
Wave Polling/Verasight	August 7–11, 2026	1,591 (RV)	± 3.0%	48%	40%	12%	8%
Focaldata/Financial Times	August 7–11, 2026	1,857 (LV)	–	51%	45%	4%	6%
Focaldata/Financial Times	August 7–11, 2026	1,913 (RV)	–	49%	43%	8% (Note: "I would not vote" and "Other" with 4%)	6%
Focaldata/Financial Times	August 7–11, 2026	2,152 (A)	–	48%	41%	11% (Note: "I would not vote" with 7%; "Other" with 4%)	7%
AlphaROC	August 8–10, 2026	1,000 (A)	± 3.1%	41%	37%	22%	4%
The Economist/YouGov	August 7–10, 2026	1,419 (RV)	± 3.2%	46%	40%	14%	6%
The Economist/YouGov	August 7–10, 2026	1,558 (A)	± 3.2%	40%	32%	28% (Note: "I would not vote" with 15%; "Other" with 2%)	8%
Morning Consult	August 3–9, 2026	29,719 (RV)	± 0.6%	47%	42%	11%	5%
ActiVote	July 29 – August 8, 2026	1,000 (LV)	± 3.1%	52.5%	47.5%	–	5%
Cygnal (R)	August 6–7, 2026	1,500 (LV)	± 2.5%	49%	42%	9%	7%
John Zogby Strategies	August 4–5, 2026	921 (LV)	± 3.2%	51%	40%	9%	11%
Quantus Insights (R)	August 3–4, 2026	1,048 (LV)	± 3.2%	49%	43%	8%	6%
The Economist/YouGov	July 31 – August 3, 2026	1,472 (RV)	± 3.3%	46%	42%	12%	4%
The Economist/YouGov	July 31 – August 3, 2026	1,607 (A)	± 3.3%	41%	33%	26%	8%
Reuters/Ipsos	July 29 – August 3, 2026	3,542 (RV)	± 1.7%	42%	37%	21% (Note: "Will not/do not plan to vote" with 4%; "Candidate from another political party" with 3%)	5%
Reuters/Ipsos	July 29 – August 3, 2026	4,505 (A)	± 1.5%	36%	30%	34% (Note: "Will not/do not plan to vote" with 15%; "Candidate from another political party" with 4%; "Skipped" with 1%)	6%
Morning Consult	July 27 – August 2, 2026	24,000 (RV)	± 1.0%	46%	42%	12%	4%
Big Data Poll (R)	July 27–29, 2026	2,617 (LV)	± 1.7%	50%	39%	10% (Note: "Someone else / third party" with 10%)	11%
Big Data Poll (R)	July 27–29, 2026	2,617 (LV)	± 1.7%	48%	37%	15% (Note: "Someone else / third party" with 7%)	11%
Big Data Poll (R)	July 27–29, 2026	2,922 (RV)	± 1.8%	49%	38%	13% (Note: "Someone else / third party" with 13%)	11%
Big Data Poll (R)	July 27–29, 2026	2,922 (RV)	± 1.8%	46%	35%	19% (Note: "Someone else / third party" with 8%)	9%
Marquette University Law School	July 22–29, 2026	572 (LV)	± 4.4%	51%	45%	4%	6%
Marquette University Law School	July 22–29, 2026	886 (RV)	± 3.5%	46%	44%	10% (Note: "Neither" with 8%; "Would not vote" with 2%)	2%
Marquette University Law School	July 22–29, 2026	1,076 (A)	± 3.2%	45%	41%	14% (Note: "Neither" with 9%; "Would not vote" with 5%)	4%
CNN/SSRS	July 23–27, 2026	914 (RV)	± 3.2%	47%	39%	14%	8%
Quinnipiac University	July 23–27, 2026	963 (RV)	± 4.1%	48%	41%	11%	7%
Reuters/Ipsos	July 24–26, 2026	1,003 (RV)	± 3.2%	40%	38%	22% (Note: "Will not/do not plan to vote" and "Candidate from another political party" with 3%; "Skipped" with 1%)	2%
Reuters/Ipsos	July 24–26, 2026	1,246 (A)	± 2.9%	36%	32%	32% (Note: "Will not/do not plan to vote" with 13%; "Candidate from another political party" with 4%; "Skipped" with 1%)	4%
Morning Consult	July 20–26, 2026	24,000 (RV)	± 1.0%	46%	43%	11%	3%
The Argument/Verasight	July 20–26, 2026	3,000 (RV)	± 2.0%	54%	46%	–	8%
The Argument/Verasight	July 20–26, 2026	3,000 (RV)	± 2.0%	48%	40%	12%	8%
CBS News/YouGov	July 22–24, 2026	1,474 (RV)	–	47%	40%	13% (Note: "Doesn't matter either way" with 7%)	7%
Clarity Campaign Labs (D)	July 17–22, 2026	1,000 (LV)	± 3.0%	52%	42%	6%	10%
McLaughlin & Associates (R)	July 15–21, 2026	1,000 (LV)	–	46%	44%	10%	2%
Emerson College	July 19–20, 2026	1,100 (LV)	± 2.9%	53%	42%	5%	11%
Beacon Research (D)/ Shaw & Co. Research (R)	July 17–20, 2026	1,003 (RV)	± 3.0%	53%	46%	1%	7%
The Economist/YouGov	July 17–20, 2026	1,432 (RV)	± 3.2%	46%	41%	13%	5%
The Economist/YouGov	July 17–20, 2026	1,602 (A)	± 3.2%	39%	33%	28% (Note: "I would not vote" with 16%; "Other" with 2%)	6%
Morning Consult	July 17–19, 2026	2,200 (RV)	–	46%	43%	11%	3%
Focaldata (Note: Poll commissioned by CoinBase)	July 14–20, 2026	2,064 (A)	—	44%	36%	20% (Note: "I would not vote" with 7%; "Another candidate" with 4%)	8%
Strength In Numbers/Verasight	July 14–17, 2026	1,364 (RV)	–	50%	43%	7%	7%
Strength In Numbers/Verasight	July 14–17, 2026	1,514 (A)	± 2.6%	48%	42%	10%	6%
AlphaROC	July 13–14, 2026	1,000 (A)	± 3.1%	42%	37%	21%	6%
RMG Research	July 6–14, 2026	2,000 (RV)	± 2.2%	47%	45%	8% (Note: "Would not vote" with 3%)	2%
Morning Consult	July 10–13, 2026	2,200 (RV)	–	46%	43%	11%	3%
The Economist/YouGov	July 10–13, 2026	1,447 (RV)	± 3.2%	46%	42%	12% (Note: "I would not vote" with 3%; "Other" with 2%)	4%
The Economist/YouGov	July 10–13, 2026	1,612 (A)	± 3.2%	39%	35%	24%	4%
Echelon Insights	July 9–13, 2026	1,004 (LV)	± 3.6%	50%	44%	6%	6%
The Washington Post/Ipsos	July 8–13, 2026	1,483 (LV)	± 2.6%	53%	45%	2%	8%
The Washington Post/Ipsos	July 8–13, 2026	2,092 (RV)	± 2.2%	48%	45%	7%	3%
Harvard/Harris Poll/HarrisX	July 11–12, 2026	1,776 (RV)	± 2.3%	50%	50%	–	Tie
Harvard/Harris Poll/HarrisX	July 11–12, 2026	– (LV)	–	51%	49%	–	2%
Hart Research Associates (D)/ Public Opinion Strategies (R)	July 8–12, 2026	1,000 (RV)	± 3.1%	49%	45%	6%	4%
Pew Research Center	July 6–12, 2026	2,779 (RV)	± 2.2%	43%	37%	20% (Note: "Not sure" with 14%; "Another/Lean to another candidate" with 5%)	6%
HarrisX/2WAY	July 9–10, 2026	787 (LV)	–	47%	44%	9%	3%
HarrisX/2WAY	July 9–10, 2026	787 (LV)	–	51%	49%	–	2%
HarrisX/2WAY	July 9–10, 2026	1,019 (RV)	–	44%	41%	15%	3%
HarrisX/2WAY	July 9–10, 2026	1,019 (RV)	–	52%	48%	–	4%
Quantus Insights (R)	July 3–7, 2026	1,140 (LV)	± 2.9%	47%	42%	11%	5%
Morning Consult	June 29 – July 5, 2026	24,000 (RV)	± 1.0%	46%	42%	12%	4%
Manhattan Institute	July 1–6, 2026	1,121 (LV)	± 3.1%	47%	43%	10%	4%
Zogby Analytics	July 1–4, 2026	1,003 (LV)	± 3.1%	42%	36%	22% (Note: "Independent/Other/Minor party" with 15%; "Not sure/Will not vote" with 7%)	6%
Talker Research (Note: Poll conducted for Scripps News)	June 25 – July 2, 2026	2,000 (RV)	± 2.2%	48%	39%	13% (Note: "Other" with 4%; "I wouldn't vote" with 3%)	9%
Cygnal (R)	June 30 – July 1, 2026	1,500 (LV)	± 2.5%	50%	44%	6%	6%
Rasmussen Reports (R)	June 24 – July 1, 2026	2,224 (LV)	± 2.0%	46%	42%	12%	4%
Focaldata/Financial Times	June 26–30, 2026	1,723 (RV)	–	51%	44%	5% (Note: "Other" with 5%)	7%
Focaldata/Financial Times	June 26–30, 2026	1,795 (RV)	–	49%	42%	9%	7%
Focaldata/Financial Times	June 26–30, 2026	2,016 (A)	–	47%	39%	14% (Note: "I would not vote" with 10%; "Other" with 4%)	8%
The Economist/YouGov	June 26–29, 2026	1,426 (RV)	± 3.2%	45%	42%	13%	3%
The Economist/YouGov	June 26–29, 2026	1,603 (A)	± 3.2%	37%	35%	27%	2%
AlphaROC	June 27–28, 2026	1,000 (A)	± 3.1%	43%	37%	20%	7%
Morning Consult	June 26–28, 2026	2,202 (RV)	–	46%	42%	12%	4%
Big Data Poll (R)	June 26–28, 2026	2,604 (LV)	± 1.8%	50%	41%	9% (Note: "Someone else / third party" with 9%)	9%
Big Data Poll (R)	June 26–28, 2026	2,604 (LV)	± 1.8%	48%	39%	13% (Note: "Someone else / third party" with 5%)	9%
Big Data Poll (R)	June 26–28, 2026	2,971 (RV)	± 1.7%	47%	39%	14% (Note: "Someone else / third party" with 14%)	8%
Big Data Poll (R)	June 26–28, 2026	2,971 (RV)	± 1.7%	45%	37%	18%	8%
Morning Consult	June 22–28, 2026	24,000 (RV)	–	46%	42%	12%	4%
ActiVote	June 6–28, 2026	1,000 (LV)	± 3.1%	53%	47%	–	6%
Morning Consult/Cato Institute	June 25–26, 2026	1,797 (RV)	–	45%	39%	16% (Note: "Neither" with 11; "Would not vote" with 5%)	6%
McLaughlin & Associates (R)	June 17–23, 2026	1,000 (LV)	–	46%	43%	11%	3%
Morning Consult	June 19–22, 2026	– (RV)	–	46%	42%	12%	4%
The Economist/YouGov	June 19–22, 2026	1,517 (RV)	± 3.1%	45%	43%	12%	2%
The Economist/YouGov	June 19–22, 2026	1,679 (A)	± 3.1%	38%	35%	27% (Note: "I would not vote" with 15%; "Other" with 1%)	3%
Reuters/Ipsos	June 18–22, 2026	978 (RV)	± 3.2%	41%	36%	23% (Note: "Will not/do not plan to vote" with 6%; "Candidate from another political party" with 3%; "Skipped" with 1%)	5%
Reuters/Ipsos	June 18–22, 2026	1,262 (A)	± 2.8%	35%	31%	34%	4%
Echelon Insights	June 18–22, 2026	1,008 (LV)	± 3.5%	51%	45%	3%	6%
Quinnipiac University	June 18–22, 2026	1,165 (RV)	± 3.4%	49%	42%	9%	7%
Strength In Numbers/Verasight	June 17–22, 2026	1,896 (RV)	–	50%	43%	7%	7%
Strength In Numbers/Verasight	June 17–22, 2026	2,087 (A)	± 2.2%	48%	42%	10%	6%
Data for Progress (D)	May 15 – June 21, 2026	5,809 (LV)	± 3.0%	51%	44%	5%	7%
Quantus Insights (R)	June 16–17, 2026	1,000 (LV)	± 3.2%	47%	43%	10% (Note: "Someone else" with 3%)	4%
The Bullfinch Group	June 12–16, 2026	1,000 (RV)	± 3.1%	44%	36%	20% (Note: "Third party / Independent" with 9%)	8%
The Bullfinch Group	June 12–16, 2026	1,200 (A)	± 2.8%	43%	34%	23% (Note: "Third party / Independent" with 8%)	9%
The Economist/YouGov	June 13–15, 2026	1,402 (RV)	± 3.4%	46%	44%	10%	2%
The Economist/YouGov	June 13–15, 2026	1,547 (A)	± 3.4%	39%	36%	25%	3%
Echelon Insights	June 11–14, 2026	1,012 (LV)	± 3.7%	50%	44%	6%	6%
Morning Consult	June 8–14, 2026	24,000 (RV)	–	46%	42%	12%	4%
Emerson College	June 7–8, 2026	1,200 (LV)	± 2.8%	50%	40%	10%	10%
The Economist/YouGov	June 5–8, 2026	1,393 (RV)	± 3.3%	45%	41%	14%	4%
The Economist/YouGov	June 5–8, 2026	1,567 (A)	± 3.3%	37%	33%	30% (Note: "I would not vote" with 17%; "Other" with 1%)	4%
Reuters/Ipsos	June 3–8, 2026	3,578 (RV)	± 1.7%	41%	37%	22%	4%
Reuters/Ipsos	June 3–8, 2026	4,531 (A)	± 1.5%	35%	31%	34% (Note: "Will not/do not plan to vote" with 14%; "Candidate from another political party" with 3%; "Skipped" with 1%)	4%
Morning Consult	June 1–7, 2026	24,849 (RV)	–	46%	42%	12%	4%
Hart Research Associates (D)/ Public Opinion Strategies (R) (Note: Poll sponsored by NBC News and More Perfect)	May 29 – June 7, 2026	2,400 (RV)	± 2.0%	49%	44%	7%	5%
HarrisX/Forbes	May 20 – June 7, 2026	1,565 (LV)	–	46%	45%	9%	1%
HarrisX/Forbes	May 20 – June 7, 2026	1,876 (RV)	–	44%	43%	13%	1%
HarrisX/Forbes	May 20 – June 7, 2026	2,010 (A)	± 2.2%	43%	42%	15%	1%
Research Co.	June 4–6, 2026	1,001 (A)	–	38%	33%	29% (Note: "Some other candidate" with 8%)	5%
Clarity Campaign Labs (D)	May 28 – June 5, 2026	1,045 (LV)	± 3.0%	48%	45%	7%	3%
Noble Predictive Insights/ The Center Square	June 1–4, 2026	2,585 (RV)	± 1.9%	47%	41%	12%	6%
RMG Research	June 1–4, 2026	2,000 (RV)	± 2.2%	49%	45%	6%	4%
Cygnal (R)	June 2–3, 2026	1,500 (LV)	± 2.5%	49%	44%	7%	5%
The Argument/Verasight	May 29 – June 3, 2026	3,008 (RV)	–	53%	47%	–	6%
Quantus Insights (R)	June 1–2, 2026	1,050 (LV)	± 3.0%	47%	42%	11%	5%
The Winston Group (R)	May 30 – June 2, 2026	1,000 (RV)	± 3.0%	48%	41%	11%	7%
The Bullfinch Group	May 29 – June 2, 2026	1,000 (RV)	± 3.1%	42%	36%	22% (Note: "Independent candidate" with 11%)	6%
The Bullfinch Group	May 29 – June 2, 2026	1,200 (A)	± 2.8%	41%	34%	25%	7%
Focaldata/Financial Times	May 29 – June 1, 2026	1,483 (RV)	–	50%	45%	5%	5%
Focaldata/Financial Times	May 29 – June 1, 2026	1,537 (RV)	–	48%	43%	9%	5%
Focaldata/Financial Times	May 29 – June 1, 2026	1,718 (A)	–	45%	42%	12%	3%
The Economist/YouGov	May 29 – June 1, 2026	1,452 (RV)	± 3.2%	46%	42%	12%	4%
The Economist/YouGov	May 29 – June 1, 2026	1,603 (A)	± 3.2%	41%	35%	24% (Note: "I would not vote" with 14%; "Other" with 2%)	6%
Harvard/Harris Poll/HarrisX	May 29–31, 2026	1,725 (RV)	± 2.4%	51%	49%	–	2%
Harvard/Harris Poll/HarrisX	May 29–31, 2026	– (LV)	–	52%	48%	–	4%
Morning Consult	May 25–31, 2026	– (RV)	–	45%	42%	13%	3%
I&I/TIPP Insights (R)	May 26–28, 2026	1,332 (RV)	± 2.9%	46%	41%	13%	5%
Big Data Poll (R)	May 24–27, 2026	2,784 (LV)	± 1.8%	51%	38%	10%	13%
Big Data Poll (R)	May 24–27, 2026	2,784 (LV)	± 1.8%	49%	36%	16%	13%
Big Data Poll (R)	May 24–27, 2026	3,121 (RV)	± 1.7%	50%	37%	13%	13%
Big Data Poll (R)	May 24–27, 2026	3,121 (RV)	± 1.7%	47%	34%	19%	13%
The Economist/YouGov	May 22–26, 2026	1,393 (RV)	± 3.3%	46%	41%	13%	5%
The Economist/YouGov	May 22–26, 2026	1,514 (A)	± 3.3%	39%	33%	28% (Note: "I would not vote" with 14%; "Other" with 1%)	6%
Marquette University Law School	May 20–26, 2026	576 (LV)	± 4.4%	49%	48%	3%	1%
Marquette University Law School	May 20–26, 2026	857 (RV)	± 3.6%	46%	45%	9% (Note: "Neither" with 7%; "Would not vote" with 1%)	1%
Marquette University Law School	May 20–26, 2026	1,001 (A)	± 3.4%	45%	41%	14%	4%
Pennsylvania State University/YouGov	May 19–26, 2026	862 (RV)	± 4.0%	41%	37%	22% (Note: "Will not vote" with 5%; "Third party candidate" with 2%)	4%
Emerson College	May 24–25, 2026	1,000 (LV)	± 3.0%	50%	41%	9%	9%
John Zogby Strategies	May 21–22, 2026	– (LV)	–	49%	42%	9%	7%
Morris Predictive Insights/Verasight (Note: Poll commissioned by UNITE HERE)	May 18–20, 2026	2,000 (A)	± 2.7%	52%	41%	7% (Note: "Would not vote" with 7%)	11%
Rasmussen Reports (R)	May 13–20, 2026	2,161 (LV)	± 2.0%	47%	41%	12%	6%
Strength In Numbers/Verasight	May 18–19, 2026	1,413 (RV)	–	51%	43%	6%	8%
Strength In Numbers/Verasight	May 18–19, 2026	1,520 (A)	± 2.7%	51%	41%	8%	10%
The Rainey Center	May 17–18, 2026	1,010 (RV)	± 3.3%	45%	43%	12% (Note: "I would not vote" with 5%)	6%
Data for Progress (D)	May 15–18, 2026	1,149 (LV)	± 3.0%	51%	43%	6%	8%
Reuters/Ipsos	May 15–18, 2026	984 (RV)	± 3.2%	39%	38%	23%	1%
Reuters/Ipsos	May 15–18, 2026	1,271 (A)	± 2.8%	35%	31%	34%	4%
The Economist/YouGov	May 15–18, 2026	1,375 (RV)	± 3.3%	46%	43%	11%	3%
The Economist/YouGov	May 15–18, 2026	1,543 (A)	± 3.3%	40%	35%	25%	5%
Echelon Insights	May 14–18, 2026	1,008 (LV)	± 3.5%	51%	43%	6%	8%
Quinnipiac University	May 14–18, 2026	1,106 (RV)	± 3.7%	50%	39%	11%	11%
McLaughlin & Associates (R)	May 12–18, 2026	1,000 (LV)	–	46%	42%	12%	4%
Impact Research (D)/ National Research Inc. (R)	May 7–18, 2026	1,500 (RV)	± 2.5%	48%	40%	12%	8%
Morning Consult	May 15–17, 2026	2,203 (RV)	–	47%	41%	12%	6%
Morning Consult	May 11–17, 2026	28,525 (RV)	–	46%	42%	12%	4%
CBS News/YouGov	May 13–15, 2026	1,397 (RV)	–	45%	40%	15%	5%
New York Times/Siena College	May 11–15, 2026	1,507 (RV)	–	50%	39%	11%	11%
The Economist/YouGov	May 9–11, 2026	1,406 (RV)	± 3.2%	45%	40%	15% (Note: "I would not vote" with 4%; "Other" with 2%)	5%
The Economist/YouGov	May 9–11, 2026	1,547 (A)	± 3.2%	37%	34%	29%	3%
Reuters/Ipsos	May 8–11, 2026	993 (RV)	–	41%	35%	24%	6%
Reuters/Ipsos	May 8–11, 2026	1,254 (A)	± 2.9%	36%	31%	33% (Note: "Will not/do not plan to vote" with 14%; "Candidate from another political party" with 5%; "Skipped" with 1%)	5%
AtlasIntel	May 4–7, 2026	2,069 (A)	± 2.0%	55%	40%	5%	15%
Cygnal (R) (Note: Poll sponsored by the Conservative Energy Network)	May 4–7, 2026	1,500 (LV)	± 2.5%	48%	41%	11%	7%
Cygnal (R)	May 5–6, 2026	1,500 (LV)	± 2.5%	49%	42%	9%	7%
RMG Research	May 4–6, 2026	2,000 (RV)	± 2.2%	50%	41%	9%	9%
HarrisX/Forbes	April 29 – May 5, 2026	1,891 (LV)	–	48%	42%	10% (Note: "Other" with 1%)	6%
HarrisX/Forbes	April 29 – May 5, 2026	2,359 (RV)	–	46%	41%	13%	5%
HarrisX/Forbes	April 29 – May 5, 2026	2,569 (A)	± 1.9%	46%	40%	14%	6%
Focaldata/Financial Times	May 1–5, 2026	3,017 (RV)	–	52%	44%	4%	8%
Focaldata/Financial Times	May 1–5, 2026	3,167 (RV)	–	49%	42%	9%	7%
Focaldata/Financial Times	May 1–5, 2026	3,612 (A)	–	46%	39%	15% (Note: "I would not vote" with 11%; "Other" with 4%)	7%
The Economist/YouGov	May 1–4, 2026	1,406 (RV)	± 3.3%	44%	41%	15%	3%
The Economist/YouGov	May 1–4, 2026	1,703 (A)	± 3.3%	38%	34%	28% (Note: "I would not vote" with 13%; "Other" with 2%)	4%
CNN/SSRS	April 30 – May 4, 2026	– (RV)	± 3.2%	45%	42%	13% (Note: "Neither" with 11%; "Do not plan to vote" with 3%)	3%
Morning Consult	April 30 – May 3, 2026	2,201 (RV)	–	46%	43%	11%	3%
Marist University	April 27–30, 2026	1,155 (RV)	± 3.3%	52%	42%	6% (Note: "Another candidate" with 4%")	10%
Big Data Poll (R)	April 25–28, 2026	2,874 (LV)	± 1.7%	50%	39%	10%	11%
Big Data Poll (R)	April 25–28, 2026	2,874 (LV)	± 1.7%	47%	37%	16% (Note: "Someone else / third party" with 6%)	10%
Big Data Poll (R)	April 25–28, 2026	3,176 (RV)	± 1.8%	48%	38%	13%	10%
Big Data Poll (R)	April 25–28, 2026	3,176 (RV)	± 1.8%	45%	35%	20%	10%
The Washington Post/ABC News/Ipsos	April 24–28, 2026	2,059 (RV)	± 2.2%	49%	44%	6% (Note: "Would not vote" with 6%)	5%
The Economist/YouGov	April 24–27, 2026	1,645 (RV)	± 3.0%	46%	41%	13%	5%
The Economist/YouGov	April 24–27, 2026	1,834 (A)	± 3.0%	39%	34%	27% (Note: "I would not vote" with 12%; "Other" with 2%)	5%
Reuters/Ipsos	April 24–27, 2026	1,014 (RV)	± 3.2%	41%	37%	22%	4%
Reuters/Ipsos	April 24–27, 2026	1,269 (A)	± 2.9%	36%	31%	33% (Note: "Will not/do not plan to vote" with 15%; "Candidate from another political party" with 3%; "Don't know" with 14%; "Skipped" with 1%)	5%
Morning Consult	April 24–27, 2026	2,201 (RV)	–	45%	42%	13%	3%
Public Opinion Strategies (R) (Note: Poll commissioned by CoinDesk)	April 21–27, 2026	1,000 (RV)	–	44%	41%	15%	3%
Emerson College	April 24–26, 2026	1,000 (LV)	± 3.0%	50%	40%	10%	10%
Harvard/Harris Poll/HarrisX	April 23–26, 2026	2,745 (RV)	± 1.9%	50%	50%	–	Tie
Harvard/Harris Poll/HarrisX	April 23–26, 2026	– (LV)	–	50%	50%	–	Tie
Clarity Campaign Labs (D)	April 15–24, 2026	1,000 (LV)	± 3.1%	50%	45%	5%	5%
Quantus Insights (R)	April 21–23, 2026	1,452 (LV)	± 2.6%	47%	42%	11%	5%
The Argument/Verasight	April 20–23, 2026	1,516 (RV)	± 2.7%	53%	47%	–	6%
The Argument/Verasight	April 20–23, 2026	1,516 (RV)	± 2.7%	47%	40%	13%	7%
Beacon Research (D)/ Shaw & Co. Research (R)	April 17–20, 2026	1,001 (RV)	± 3.0%	52%	47%	1%	5%
Echelon Insights	April 17–20, 2026	1,012 (LV)	± 3.5%	50%	44%	6%	6%
The Economist/YouGov	April 17–20, 2026	1,549 (RV)	± 3.1%	45%	40%	15%	5%
The Economist/YouGov	April 17–20, 2026	1,703 (A)	± 3.1%	39%	33%	28%	6%
Reuters/Ipsos	April 15–20, 2026	3,577 (RV)	–	41%	38%	21%	3%
Reuters/Ipsos	April 15–20, 2026	4,557 (A)	± 1.5%	35%	31%	34%	4%
Hart Research Associates (D)/ Public Opinion Strategies (R)	April 15–19, 2025	1,000 (RV)	± 3.1%	49%	45%	6%	4%
KFF	April 14–19, 2026	1,107 (RV)	± 4.0%	43%	34%	23% (Note: "Undecided" with 14%; "Neither/another party" with 5%; "I wouldn't vote" with 4%)	9%
Morning Consult	April 13–19, 2026	27,869 (RV)	–	45%	42%	13%	3%
John Zogby Strategies	April 17–18, 2026	1,001 (LV)	± 3.2%	48%	44%	8% (Note: "Other party" 4%)	4%
Marquette University Law School	April 8–16, 2026	576 (LV)	± 4.4%	53%	43%	4%	10%
Marquette University Law School	April 8–16, 2026	870 (RV)	± 3.6%	48%	44%	8% (Note: "Neither" with 6%; "Would not vote" with 1%)	4%
Marquette University Law School	April 8–16, 2026	982 (A)	± 3.4%	44%	41%	15% (Note: "Neither" with 10%; "Would not vote" with 5%)	3%
GBAO (D)/Third Way (D)	April 8–15, 2026	2,000 (RV)	–	48%	40%	12%	8%
McLaughlin & Associates (R)	April 8–15, 2026	1,000 (LV)	–	47%	43%	10%	4%
Strength In Numbers/Verasight	April 10–14, 2026	1,386 (RV)	–	50%	43%	7%	7%
Strength In Numbers/Verasight	April 10–14, 2026	1,514 (A)	± 2.6%	49%	41%	10%	8%
Survey 160	April 8–13, 2026	1,539 (RV)	± 3.2%	47%	37%	16%	10%
Morning Consult	April 6–12, 2026	12,505 (RV)	–	46%	42%	12%	4%
Tavern Research (D)	April 6–9, 2026	502 (LV)	–	44%	43%	13%	1%
Morning Consult	April 6–9, 2026	2,200 (RV)	–	46%	42%	12%	4%
RMG Research	April 6–9, 2026	2,000 (RV)	± 2.2%	49%	44%	7%	5%
RMG Research	April 6–9, 2026	2,000 (RV)	± 2.2%	45%	42%	7%	3%
Echelon Insights	April 3–9, 2026	2,880 (LV)	± 3.2%	50%	45%	5%	5%
Morning Consult	April 3–4, 2026	2,203 (RV)	–	45%	42%	13%	3%
The Economist/YouGov	April 3–6, 2026	1,558 (RV)	± 3.0%	44%	42%	14%	2%
The Economist/YouGov	April 3–6, 2026	1,745 (A)	± 3.0%	38%	36%	26%	2%
Cygnal (R)	April 2–3, 2026	1,500 (LV)	± 2.5%	49%	43%	8%	6%
Morning Consult	March 30 – April 5, 2026	12,505 (RV)	–	45%	42%	13%	2%
UMass Lowell/YouGov	March 26–30, 2026	1,000 (A)	± 4.1%	38%	35%	27% (Note: "I would not vote" with 15%; "Another candidate" with 1%)	3%
CNN/SSRS	March 26–30, 2026	951 (RV)	± 3.5%	48%	42%	10% (Note: "Neither" with 8%; "Do not plan to vote" with 2%)	6%
Harvard/Harris Poll/HarrisX	March 25–26, 2026	2,009 (RV)	± 2.0%	51%	49%	–	2%
Harvard/Harris Poll/HarrisX	March 25–26, 2026	– (LV)	–	52%	48%	–	4%
Quantus Insights (R)	March 25–26, 2026	1,472 (LV)	± 2.8%	47%	41%	12%	6%
Big Data Poll (R)	March 22–24, 2026	3,003 (RV)	± 1.9%	48%	40%	12% (Note: "Someone else / third party" with 12%)	8%
Big Data Poll (R)	March 22–24, 2026	3,003 (RV)	± 1.9%	45%	37%	18%	8%
The Economist/YouGov	March 20–23, 2026	1,501 (RV)	± 3.0%	45%	42%	12%	3%
The Economist/YouGov	March 20–23, 2026	1,664 (A)	± 3.0%	39%	36%	25%	3%
Quinnipiac University	March 19–23, 2026	1,191 (RV)	± 3.6%	51%	40%	9%	11%
Rasmussen Reports (R)	March 16–23, 2026	2,222 (LV)	± 2.0%	45%	42%	13%	3%
Yale Youth Poll	March 9–23, 2026	3,429 (RV)	± 1.4%	46%	44%	10%	2%
Reuters/Ipsos	March 20–22, 2026	985 (RV)	–	40%	38%	22%	2%
Reuters/Ipsos	March 20–22, 2026	1,272 (A)	± 2.8%	35%	31%	34%	4%
Morning Consult (Note: Poll commissioned by Gambling is Not Investing)	March 17–22, 2026	15,029 (A)	± 1.0%	47%	42%	11%	5%
Morning Consult	March 16–22, 2026	26,406 (RV)	–	45%	42%	13%	3%
Impact Research (D)/ BSP Research (D) (Note: Poll sponsored by Third Way and UnidosUS)	March 10–20, 2026	1,000 (LV)	–	45%	41%	14% (Note: "Depends" with 12%; "Neither" with 2%)	4%
Reuters/Ipsos	March 17–19, 2026	1,206 (RV)	–	40%	37%	23%	3%
Reuters/Ipsos	March 17–19, 2026	1,545 (A)	± 2.5%	35%	32%	33% (Note: "Will not/do not plan to vote" with 12%; "Candidate from another political party" with 3%; "Skipped" with 1%)	3%
John Zogby Strategies	March 17–18, 2026	1,000 (LV)	± 3.2%	46%	46%	8% (Note: "Other party" with 3%)	Tie
Quantus Insights (R)	March 17–18, 2026	1,064 (LV)	± 3.2%	47%	42%	11% (Note: "Some other candidate" with 3%)	5%
Strength In Numbers/Verasight	March 16–18, 2026	1,370 (RV)	–	49%	43%	8%	6%
Strength In Numbers/Verasight	March 16–18, 2026	1,530 (A)	± 2.5%	48%	41%	11%	7%
Emerson College	March 16–17, 2026	1,000 (LV)	± 3.0%	49%	42%	9%	7%
The Winston Group (R)	March 15–17, 2026	1,000 (RV)	± 3.0%	49%	40%	11%	9%
The Argument/Verasight	March 12–17, 2026	1,519 (RV)	± 2.7%	54%	46%	–	8%
The Argument/Verasight	March 12–17, 2026	1,519 (RV)	± 2.7%	46%	40%	14%	6%
Morning Consult	March 13–16, 2026	2,201 (RV)	–	48%	40%	12%	8%
The Economist/YouGov	March 13–16, 2026	1,427 (RV)	± 3.2%	43%	41%	16%	2%
The Economist/YouGov	March 13–16, 2026	1,593 (A)	± 3.2%	39%	35%	26% (Note: "I would not vote" with 13%; "Other" with 1%)	4%
Yahoo News/YouGov	March 12–16, 2026	1,147 (RV)	± 3.1%	44%	40%	16%	4%
Echelon Insights	March 12–16, 2026	1,033 (LV)	± 3.4%	49%	44%	7%	5%
Survey 160	March 9–15, 2026	1,546 (RV)	± 3.2%	48%	38%	14%	10%
Morning Consult	March 9–15, 2026	26,63 (RV)	–	45%	42%	13%	3%
Focaldata	March 6–10, 2026	1,456 (RV)	–	50%	44%	6%	6%
Focaldata	March 6–10, 2026	1,534 (RV)	–	48%	42%	10% (Note: "I would not vote" and "Another candidate" with 5%)	6%
Focaldata	March 6–10, 2026	1,782 (A)	–	45%	39%	16% (Note: "I would not vote" with 11%; "Another candidate" with 5%)	6%
The Economist/YouGov	March 6–9, 2026	1,403 (RV)	± 3.2%	45%	42%	13%	3%
The Economist/YouGov	March 6–9, 2026	1,561 (A)	± 3.2%	40%	36%	24%	4%
McLaughlin & Associates (R)	March 4–9, 2026	1,000 (LV)	–	47%	43%	10%	4%
Morning Consult	March 2–8, 2026	25,948 (RV)	–	45%	42%	13%	3%
Clarity Campaign Labs (D)	February 26 – March 7, 2026	1,004 (LV)	± 3.1%	47%	43%	10%	4%
RMG Research	March 2–5, 2026	2,000 (RV)	± 2.2%	46%	46%	8%	Tie
RMG Research	March 2–5, 2026	2,000 (RV)	± 2.2%	44%	43%	13%	1%
Cygnal (R)	March 3–4, 2026	1,500 (LV)	± 2.5%	49%	45%	6%	4%
Marist University	March 2–4, 2026	1,392 (RV)	± 3.0%	53%	44%	3%	9%
Quantus Insights (R)	March 2–3, 2026	1,624 (LV)	± 2.6%	48%	42%	10%	6%
Quantus Insights (R)	March 2–3, 2026	1,624 (LV)	± 2.6%	46%	41%	13%	5%
Hart Research Associates (D)/ Public Opinion Strategies (R)	February 27 – March 3, 2026	1,000 (RV)	± 3.1%	50%	44%	6%	6%
The Economist/YouGov	February 27 – March 2, 2026	1,363 (RV)	± 3.2%	45%	41%	14%	4%
The Economist/YouGov	February 27 – March 2, 2026	1,512 (A)	± 3.2%	40%	33%	27%	7%
Morning Consult	February 23 – March 1, 2026	– (RV)	–	45%	42%	13%	3%
The Public Sentiment Institute	February 28, 2026	249 (LV)	± 5.5%	50%	41%	7% (Note: "Third party / Independent" with 2%)	9%
The Public Sentiment Institute	February 28, 2026	316 (RV)	± 5.5%	41%	33%	26% (Note: "Third party / Independent" with 3%)	8%
CBS News/YouGov	February 25–27, 2026	1,523 (RV)	± 2.5%	45%	40%	15% (Note: "Doesn't matter either way" with 8%, "Not sure" with 7%)	5%
I&I/TIPP Insights (R)	February 24–27, 2026	1,264 (RV)	± 3.0%	46%	44%	10%	2%
Harvard/Harris Poll/HarrisX	February 25–26, 2026	1,999 (RV)	± 2.0%	50%	50%	–	Tie
Harvard/Harris Poll/HarrisX	February 25–26, 2026	– (LV)	± 2.0%	50%	50%	–	Tie
Cygnal (R) (Note: Poll sponsored by the American Principles Project, which supports Republicans)	February 24–26, 2026	1,048 (LV)	± 3.0%	48%	45%	7%	3%
GrayHouse (R) (Note: Poll sponsored by America One Policies, a Republican super PAC)	February 20–23, 2026	1,394 (RV)	± 2.6%	43%	40%	17%	3%
The Economist/YouGov	February 20–23, 2026	1,402 (RV)	± 3.1%	45%	41%	14%	4%
Echelon Insights	February 19–23, 2026	1,002 (LV)	± 3.5%	50%	46%	4%	4%
Pennsylvania State University/YouGov	February 18–23, 2026	824 (LV)	± 3.8%	42%	37%	21% (Note: "Third party candidate" and "Would not vote" with 3%)	5%
Reuters/Ipsos	February 18–23, 2026	3,686 (RV)	± 2.0%	40%	38%	22%	2%
Reuters/Ipsos	February 18–23, 2026	4,638 (A)	± 1.5%	35%	32%	34% (Note: "Will not/do not plan to vote" with 15%; "Don't know" with 14%; "Candidate from another political party" with 4%; "Skipped" with 1%)	3%
Emerson College	February 21–22, 2026	1,000 (LV)	± 3.0%	50%	42%	8%	8%
Morning Consult	February 20–22, 2026	2,202 (RV)	–	46%	42%	12%	4%
Global Strategy Group (D) (Note: Poll sponsored by Campaign For A Family Friendly Economy PAC)	February 17–22, 2026	1,051 (LV)	± 3.5%	48%	40%	12%	8%
Strength In Numbers/Verasight	February 18–20, 2026	1,401 (RV)	–	52%	42%	6%	10%
Strength In Numbers/Verasight	February 18–20, 2026	1,566 (A)	± 2.5%	50%	40%	10%	10%
Talker Research	February 13–19, 2026	1,000 (A)	± 3.1%	42%	36%	22% (Note: "I wouldn't vote" with 9%; "Other" with 5%)	6%
Big Data Poll (R) (Note: Poll conducted for 1776 Law Center)	February 16–18, 2026	2,012 (RV)	± 2.1%	48%	40%	12%	8%
Big Data Poll (R)	February 16–18, 2026	2,012 (RV)	± 2.1%	45%	37%	18%	8%
Big Data Poll (R)	February 16–18, 2026	1,805 (LV)	± 2.3%	50%	41%	9%	9%
Big Data Poll (R)	February 16–18, 2026	1,805 (LV)	± 2.3%	48%	39%	13%	9%
BGSU/YouGov	February 13–18, 2026	1,200 (RV)	± 3.2%	49%	41%	10%	8%
Washington Post/ABC News/Ipsos	February 12–17, 2026	2,087 (RV)	± 2.2%	47%	45%	8% (Note: "Would not vote" with 8%)	2%
Washington Post/ABC News/Ipsos	February 12–17, 2026	2,589 (A)	± 2.0%	43%	39%	18% (Note: "Would not vote" with 18%)	4%
The Economist/YouGov	February 13–16, 2026	1,509 (RV)	± 3.0%	47%	40%	13%	7%
The Economist/YouGov	February 13–16, 2026	1,678 (A)	± 3.0%	39%	33%	28%	6%
Reuters/Ipsos	February 13–16, 2026	846 (RV)	± 3.0%	41%	37%	14%	4%
Reuters/Ipsos	February 13–16, 2026	1,117 (A)	± 3.0%	36%	32%	32% (Note: "Will not/do not plan to vote" with 15%; "Don't know" with 14%; "Candidate from another political party" with 3%)	4%
Morning Consult	February 13–16, 2026	2,200 (RV)	–	45%	43%	12%	2%
Quantus Insights (R)	February 12–13, 2026	1,515 (LV)	± 2.5%	48%	42%	10% (Note: "Third party/other" with 3%)	6%
Quantus Insights (R)	February 12–13, 2026	1,515 (LV)	± 2.5%	41%	39%	20%	2%
RMG Research	February 9–12, 2026	2,000 (RV)	± 2.2%	45%	47%	8%	2%
RMG Research	February 9–12, 2026	2,000 (RV)	± 2.2%	41%	44%	15%	3%
Yahoo News/YouGov	February 9–12, 2026	1,149 (RV)	–	44%	41%	15%	3%
Focaldata	February 10, 2026	– (LV)	–	51%	44%	5%	7%
Focaldata	February 10, 2026	– (RV)	–	49%	44%	7% (Note: "Another candidate" with 7%)	5%
Focaldata	February 10, 2026	– (RV)	–	46%	42%	12% (Note: "Another candidate" and "I would not vote" with 6%)	4%
Focaldata	February 10, 2026	– (A)	–	42%	38%	20% (Note: "I would not vote" with 14%; "Another candidate" with 6%)	4%
The Argument/Verasight	February 4–10, 2026	3,003 (RV)	± 2.0%	53%	47%	–	6%
The Argument/Verasight	February 4–10, 2026	3,003 (RV)	± 2.0%	46%	41%	13%	5%
Morning Consult	February 6–9, 2026	2,200 (RV)	–	45%	41%	14%	4%
The Economist/YouGov	February 6–9, 2026	1,549 (RV)	± 3.0%	44%	38%	18%	6%
The Economist/YouGov	February 6–9, 2026	1,728 (A)	± 3.0%	39%	31%	30%	8%
Morning Consult	February 2–8, 2026	29,303 (RV)	–	45%	42%	13%	3%
John Zogby Strategies	February 4–5, 2026	1,000 (LV)	± 3.2%	47%	42%	11% (Note: "Another party" with 4%)	5%
Cygnal (R)	February 3–4, 2026	1,500 (LV)	± 2.5%	48%	44%	8%	4%
The Economist/YouGov	January 30 – February 2, 2026	1,501 (RV)	± 3.0%	44%	40%	16%	4%
The Economist/YouGov	January 30 – February 2, 2026	1,668 (A)	± 3.0%	36%	34%	30%	2%
Morning Consult	January 30 – February 1, 2026	2,201 (RV)	–	47%	42%	11%	5%
Public Policy Polling (D)	January 29–30, 2026	652 (RV)	–	48%	41%	11%	7%
Harvard/Harris Poll/HarrisX	January 28–29, 2026	2,000 (RV)	± 2.0%	54%	46%	–	8%
Harvard/Harris Poll/HarrisX	January 28–29, 2026	2,000 (RV)	± 2.0%	41%	41%	18% (Note: "Third party" with 5%)	Tie
Harvard/Harris Poll/HarrisX	January 28–29, 2026	– (LV)	–	52%	48%	–	4%
Harvard/Harris Poll/HarrisX	January 28–29, 2026	– (LV)	–	47%	44%	9% (Note: "Third party" with 2%)	3%
I&I/TIPP Insights (R)	January 27–28, 2026	1,126 (RV)	± 3.1%	45%	42%	13%	3%
Cygnal (R)	January 27–28, 2026	1,004 (LV)	± 3.1%	48%	44%	8%	4%
Marquette University Law School	January 21–28, 2026	577 (LV)	± 4.4%	52%	45%	3% (Note: "Neither" with 3%)	7%
Marquette University Law School	January 21–28, 2026	869 (RV)	± 3.6%	48%	44%	8%	4%
Marquette University Law School	January 21–28, 2026	1,003 (A)	± 3.4%	45%	39%	16% (Note: "Neither" with 10%; "Would not vote" with 7%)	6%
The Argument/Verasight	January 26–27, 2026	1,515 (RV)	± 2.7%	52%	48%	–	4%
The Argument/Verasight	January 26–27, 2026	1,515 (RV)	± 2.7%	46%	42%	12%	4%
McLaughlin & Associates (R)	January 21–27, 2026	1,000 (RV)	–	46%	44%	10%	2%
Beacon Research (D)/ Shaw & Co. Research (R)	January 23–26, 2026	1,005 (RV)	± 3.0%	52%	46%	2%	6%
The Economist/YouGov	January 23–26, 2026	1,519 (RV)	± 3.1%	43%	38%	19% (Note: "I would not vote" & "Other" with 3%)	5%
The Economist/YouGov	January 23–26, 2026	1,683 (A)	± 3.1%	38%	35%	27% (Note: "I would not vote" with 11%; "Other" with 2%)	3%
Echelon Insights	January 22–26, 2026	1,029 (LV)	± 3.4%	49%	44%	7%	5%
Reuters/Ipsos	January 23–25, 2026	906 (RV)	–	41%	37%	22%	4%
Morning Consult	January 23–25, 2026	2,201 (RV)	–	45%	43%	12%	2%
Big Data Poll (R)	January 22–24, 2026	2,909 (LV)	± 2.1%	48%	44%	8%	4%
Big Data Poll (R)	January 22–24, 2026	2,909 (LV)	± 2.1%	46%	42%	12% (Note: "Someone else / third party" with 4%)	4%
Quantus Insights (R)	January 20–22, 2026	1,000 (RV)	± 3.1%	47%	41%	12% (Note: "Other candidate" with 2%)	6%
Clarity Campaign Labs (D)	January 15–22, 2026	1,147 (LV)	± 2.9%	51%	42%	7%	9%
Strength In Numbers/Verasight	January 14–20, 2026	1,352 (RV)	–	51%	43%	6%	8%
Strength In Numbers/Verasight	January 14–20, 2026	1,532 (A)	± 2.5%	50%	42%	8%	8%
KFF	January 13–20, 2026	1,141 (RV)	± 3.0%	49%	42%	9%	7%
Emerson College	January 17–19, 2026	1,000 (LV)	± 3.0%	48%	42%	10%	6%
The Economist/YouGov	January 16–19, 2026	1,717 (RV)	± 3.2%	43%	39%	18%	4%
The Economist/YouGov	January 16–19, 2026	1,547 (A)	± 3.2%	39%	34%	27%	5%
Morning Consult	January 16–18, 2026	2,201 (RV)	–	45%	43%	14%	2%
New York Times/Siena College	January 12–17, 2026	1,625 (RV)	± 2.8%	48%	43%	9%	5%
Public Policy Polling (D) (Note: Poll sponsored by the Progress Action Fund, which supports Democrats)	January 13–14, 2026	597 (RV)	–	50%	42%	8%	8%
Reuters/Ipsos	January 12–13, 2026	941 (RV)	–	40%	38%	22%	2%
Rasmussen Reports (R)	January 7–14, 2026	2,273 (LV)	± 2.0%	47%	41%	12%	6%
Impact Research (D)/ National Research Inc. (R)	January 8–13, 2026	1,500 (RV)	± 2.5%	47%	43%	10%	4%
CNN/SSRS	January 9–12, 2026	968 (RV)	± 3.5%	46%	41%	13%	5%
Morning Consult	January 9–12, 2026	2,201 (RV)	–	46%	43%	11%	3%
The Economist/YouGov	January 9–12, 2026	1,433 (RV)	± 3.1%	44%	40%	16%	4%
The Economist/YouGov	January 9–12, 2026	1,597 (A)	± 3.1%	39%	33%	28%	6%
Yahoo News/YouGov	January 8–12, 2026	1,148 (RV)	–	45%	40%	15%	5%
The Winston Group (R)	January 8–12, 2026	1,000 (RV)	± 3.0%	46%	43%	11%	3%
Cygnal (R)	January 7–8, 2026	1,500 (LV)	± 2.5%	48%	45%	7%	3%
RMG Research	January 5–8, 2026	2,000 (RV)	± 2.2%	44%	43%	13%	1%
RMG Research	January 5–8, 2026	2,000 (RV)	± 2.2%	47%	46%	7%	1%
The Economist/YouGov	January 2–5, 2026	1,386 (RV)	± 3.1%	45%	39%	16%	6%
The Economist/YouGov	January 2–5, 2026	1,547 (A)	± 3.1%	39%	32%	29%	7%
Morning Consult	January 2–4, 2026	2,201 (RV)	–	45%	42%	13%	3%
Morning Consult	December 29, 2025 – January 4, 2026	22,709 (RV)	–	44%	42%	14%	2%
The Bullfinch Group	December 30, 2025 – January 1, 2026	1,000 (RV)	± 3.1%	44%	33%	23% (Note: "Other / third-party / Independent" with 11%; "I would not vote" with 3%)	11%
The Bullfinch Group	December 30, 2025 – January 1, 2026	1,200 (A)	± 2.8%	40%	30%	30% (Note: "Other / third-party / Independent" with 10%; "I would not vote" with 9%)	10%

== 2024–2025 ==
Poll source	Date(s) administered	Sample size	Margin of error	Democratic	Republican	Other/ Undecided	Lead
The Economist/YouGov	December 26–29, 2025	1,417 (RV)	± 3.3%	42%	38%	20%	4%
The Economist/YouGov	December 26–29, 2025	1,546 (A)	± 3.3%	36%	31%	33%	5%
Big Data Poll (R)	December 26–28, 2025	3,412 (LV)	± 1.9%	48%	44%	8%	4%
Big Data Poll (R)	December 26–28, 2025	3,412 (LV)	± 1.9%	45%	42%	13%	3%
Morning Consult	December 15–21, 2025	20,240 (RV)	–	45%	42%	13%	3%
The Economist/YouGov	December 20–22, 2025	1,424 (RV)	± 3.3%	43%	40%	17% (Note: "I would not vote" with 4%; "Other" with 1%)	3%
The Economist/YouGov	December 20–22, 2025	1,591 (A)	± 3.3%	38%	34%	28%	4%
Quantus Insights (R)	December 15–17, 2025	1,000 (RV)	± 3.1%	43%	41%	16%	2%
AtlasIntel	December 15–19, 2025	2,315 (A)	± 2.0%	54%	38%	7%	16%
McLaughlin & Associates (R)	December 12–19, 2025	1,000 (RV)	–	46%	45%	9%	1%
Fabrizio Ward (R) (Note: Poll sponsored by Building America's Future, a group that supports Republicans)	December 15–17, 2025	1,000 (RV)	± 3.1%	45%	38%	17%	7%
Emerson College	December 14–15, 2025	1,000 (RV)	± 3.0%	44%	42%	14%	2%
Reuters/Ipsos	December 12–15, 2025	775 (RV)	–	40%	36%	24%	4%
The Economist/YouGov	December 12–15, 2025	1,451 (RV)	± 3.2%	43%	39%	18%	4%
The Economist/YouGov	December 12–15, 2025	1,630 (A)	± 3.2%	37%	33%	30%	4%
Morning Consult	December 12–15, 2025	2,201 (RV)	–	45%	44%	11%	1%
Echelon Insights	December 11–15, 2025	1,011 (LV)	± 3.8%	48%	45%	7%	3%
Quinnipiac University	December 11–15, 2025	1,035 (RV)	± 3.9%	47%	43%	10%	4%
Big Data Poll (R)	December 10–12, 2025	3,004 (RV)	± 1.8%	47%	43%	10%	4%
Big Data Poll (R)	December 10–12, 2025	3,004 (RV)	± 1.8%	44%	41%	15%	3%
The Argument/Verasight	December 5–11, 2025	– (LV)	–	52%	48%	–	4%
The Argument/Verasight	December 5–11, 2025	1,521 (RV)	± 2.7%	50%	49%	–	1%
The Argument/Verasight	December 5–11, 2025	1,521 (RV)	± 2.7%	44%	42%	14%	2%
Clarity Campaign Labs (D)	December 4–11, 2025	1,000 (LV)	± 3.1%	49%	44%	7%	5%
GrayHouse (R)	December 6–8, 2025	2,058 (RV)	± 2.2%	45%	41%	14%	4%
The Economist/YouGov	December 5–8, 2025	1,379 (RV)	± 3.2%	42%	37%	21%	6%
The Economist/YouGov	December 5–8, 2025	1,529 (A)	± 3.2%	37%	32%	31%	5%
Hart Research Associates (D)/ Public Opinion Strategies (R)	December 4–8, 2025	800 (RV)	± 3.5%	50%	46%	4%	4%
Reuters/Ipsos	December 3–8, 2025	3,521 (RV)	± 2.0%	40%	39%	21%	1%
Cygnal (R)	December 5–7, 2025	1,500 (LV)	± 2.5%	48%	44%	8%	4%
Morning Consult	December 5–7, 2025	2,201 (RV)	–	46%	43%	11%	3%
Quantus Insights (R)	December 4–5, 2025	1,000 (RV)	± 3.1%	44%	40%	16%	4%
RMG Research	December 1–4, 2025	2,000 (RV)	± 3.1%	41%	45%	14%	4%
RMG Research	December 1–4, 2025	2,000 (RV)	± 3.1%	44%	48%	8%	4%
Big Data Poll (R)	November 28 – December 1, 2025	2,008 (RV)	± 2.1%	44%	42%	20%	2%
Big Data Poll (R)	November 28 – December 1, 2025	2,008 (RV)	± 2.1%	41%	39%	20%	2%
The Economist/YouGov	November 28 – December 1, 2025	1,452 (RV)	± 3.1%	45%	39%	16%	6%
The Economist/YouGov	November 28 – December 1, 2025	1,623 (A)	± 3.1%	39%	33%	28%	6%
Morning Consult	November 26–30, 2025	2,200 (RV)	–	45%	41%	14%	4%
GBAO (D)/Third Way (D)	November 19–26, 2025	2,000 (RV)	–	48%	42%	10%	6%
The Bullfinch Group	November 21–25, 2025	1,000 (RV)	± 3.1%	41%	35%	24% (Note: "Other/third-party/Independent" and "I would not vote" with 7%)	6%
The Bullfinch Group	November 21–25, 2025	1,200 (A)	± 2.8%	37%	32%	31% (Note: "I would not vote" with 12%; "Other/third-party/Independent" with 6%)	5%
The Economist/YouGov	November 21–24, 2025	1,511 (RV)	± 3.0%	39%	32%	29%	7%
The Economist/YouGov	November 21–24, 2025	1,674 (A)	± 3.0%	44%	39%	17%	5%
McLaughlin & Associates (R)	November 17–24, 2025	1,000 (RV)	–	45%	44%	11%	1%
Morning Consult	November 21–23, 2025	2,200 (RV)	–	45%	43%	13%	2%
Rasmussen Reports (R)	November 18–23, 2025	2,410 (LV)	± 2.1%	45%	42%	13%	3%
J.L. Partners (R) (Note: Poll conducted for The Daily Mail)	November 19–20, 2025	797 (LV)	–	50%	46%	4%	4%
The Economist/YouGov	November 15–17, 2025	1,380 (RV)	± 3.1%	43%	40%	17%	3%
Echelon Insights	November 13–17, 2025	1,051 (LV)	± 3.7%	49%	45%	6%	4%
The Argument/Verasight	November 10–17, 2025	– (LV)	–	54%	46%	–	8%
The Argument/Verasight	November 10–17, 2025	1,508 (RV)	± 2.6%	53%	47%	–	6%
The Argument/Verasight	November 10–17, 2025	1,508 (RV)	± 2.6%	46%	42%	12%	4%
Morning Consult	November 14–16, 2025	2,200 (RV)	–	46%	44%	10%	2%
High Point University	November 10–14, 2025	1,004 (A)	± 3.2%	46%	36%	13% (Note: "Another Party" with 7%)	10%
Marist University	November 10–13, 2025	1,291 (RV)	± 3.1%	55%	41%	4%	14%
Quantus Insights (R)	November 11–12, 2025	1,000 (RV)	± 3.3%	44%	39%	17%	5%
Reuters/Ipsos	November 7–12, 2025	938 (RV)	± 3.0%	41%	40%	19%	1%
Marquette University Law School	November 5–12, 2025	903 (RV)	± 3.5%	49%	44%	7% (Note: "Neither" with 6%; "Would not vote" with 1%)	5%
Marquette University Law School	November 5–12, 2025	1,052 (A)	± 3.3%	46%	41%	13% (Note: "Neither" with 9%; "Would not vote" with 4%)	5%
The Economist/YouGov	November 7–10, 2025	1,499 (RV)	± 3.1%	46%	39%	15%	7%
Morning Consult	November 7–9, 2025	2,201 (RV)	–	48%	43%	9%	5%
Cygnal (R)	November 5–6, 2025	1,500 (LV)	± 2.5%	50%	44%	6%	6%
Emerson College	November 3–4, 2025	1,000 (RV)	± 3.0%	44%	40%	16%	4%
The Economist/YouGov	October 31 – November 3, 2025	1,470 (RV)	± 3.1%	44%	41%	15% (Note: "Other" with 3%; "I would not vote" with 2%)	3%
RMG Research	October 27–30, 2025	2,000 (RV)	± 2.2%	42%	43%	15%	1%
RMG Research	October 27–30, 2025	2,000 (RV)	± 2.2%	44%	46%	10%	2%
CNN/SSRS	October 27–30, 2025	945 (RV)	± 3.6%	47%	42%	11% (Note: "Do not plan to vote" with 2%)	5%
NewsNation/DDHQ	October 27–29, 2025	1,159 (LV)	± 2.9%	47%	47%	7% (Note: "Third-party candidate" with 7%)	Tie
NewsNation/DDHQ	October 27–29, 2025	1,609 (RV)	± 2.4%	45%	44%	11% (Note: "Third-party candidate" with 7%; "Would not vote" with 4%)	1%
Strength In Numbers/Verasight	October 24–29, 2025	1,352 (LV)	± 2.7%	49%	41%	10%	8%
Strength In Numbers/Verasight	October 24–29, 2025	1,567 (A)	± 2.6%	46%	39%	15%	7%
Big Data Poll (R)	October 26–28, 2025	2,984 (RV)	± 1.8%	43%	41%	16%	2%
Washington Post/ABC News/Ipsos	October 24–28, 2025	2,203 (RV)	± 2.2%	46%	44%	10% (Note: "Would not vote" with 9%)	2%
Hart Research Associates (D)/ Public Opinion Strategies (R)	October 24–28, 2025	1,000 (RV)	± 3.1%	50%	42%	8%	8%
The Economist/YouGov	October 24–27, 2025	1,472 (RV)	± 3.0%	43%	40%	17%	3%
Yahoo News/YouGov	October 23–27, 2025	1,197 (RV)	± 3.1%	45%	40%	15%	5%
McLaughlin & Associates (R)	October 21–27, 2025	1,000 (RV)	–	44%	46%	10%	2%
Clarity Campaign Labs (D)	October 16–23, 2025	1,047 (RV)	± 3.0%	47%	46%	7%	1%
The Economist/YouGov	October 17–20, 2025	1,447 (RV)	± 3.0%	45%	40%	15%	5%
Quinnipiac University	October 17–20, 2025	1,327 (RV)	± 3.5%	50%	41%	9%	9%
UMass Lowell/YouGov	October 16–20, 2025	1,000 (A)	± 3.5%	38%	35%	27% (Note: "I would not vote" with 14%; "Another candidate" with 2%)	3%
Echelon Insights	October 16–20, 2025	1,010 (LV)	± 4.0%	48%	46%	6%	2%
Morning Consult	October 17–19, 2025	2,200 (RV)	–	46%	43%	11%	3%
Emerson College	October 13–14, 2025	1,000 (RV)	± 3.0%	44%	43%	13%	1%
The Argument/Verasight	October 10–16, 2025	1,530 (RV)	–	51%	49%	–	2%
The Economist/YouGov	October 10–13, 2025	1,466 (RV)	± 3.1%	43%	40%	17%	3%
Hart Research Associates (D)/ Public Opinion Strategies (R)	October 8–12, 2025	1,000 (A)	± 3.1%	48%	47%	5%	1%
YouGov Blue (D)	October 7–10, 2025	517 (RV)	–	48%	45%	7%	3%
Cygnal (R)	October 7–8, 2025	1,500 (LV)	± 2.5%	48%	45%	7%	3%
Quantus Insights (R)	October 6–8, 2025	1,000 (RV)	± 3.2%	42%	43%	15%	1%
The Economist/YouGov	October 4–6, 2025	1,486 (RV)	± 3.1%	44%	39%	17%	5%
Noble Predictive Insights/ The Center Square	October 2–6, 2025	2,565 (RV)	± 2.0%	45%	43%	12%	2%
Morning Consult	October 3–5, 2025	2,200 (RV)	–	46%	43%	11%	3%
The Economist/YouGov	September 26–29, 2025	1,517 (RV)	± 3.1%	44%	41%	15%	3%
Yahoo News/YouGov	September 25–29, 2025	1,126 (RV)	± 3.2%	44%	40%	16%	4%
New York Times/Siena College	September 22–27, 2025	1,313 (RV)	± 3.2%	47%	45%	8%	2%
RMG Research	September 22–24, 2025	2,000 (RV)	± 2.2%	41%	43%	16%	2%
RMG Research	September 22–24, 2025	2,000 (RV)	± 2.2%	45%	46%	9%	1%
The Economist/YouGov	September 19–22, 2025	1,392 (RV)	± 3.1%	45%	42%	13%	3%
Echelon Insights	September 18–22, 2025	1,071 (LV)	± 3.7%	47%	46%	7%	1%
McLaughlin & Associates (R)	September 17–22, 2025	1,000 (RV)	–	41%	47%	12%	6%
Strength In Numbers/Verasight	September 15–19, 2025	1,268 (LV)	± 2.8%	50%	45%	5%	5%
Strength In Numbers/Verasight	September 15–19, 2025	1,500 (A)	± 2.6%	47%	42%	11%	5%
AtlasIntel	September 12–16, 2025	1,066 (A)	± 3.0%	52%	44%	4% (Note: "I would not vote" with 1%)	8%
Normington Petts (D)/Third Way (D)	September 11–16, 2025	800 (V)	–	51%	49%	–	2%
The Economist/YouGov	September 12–15, 2025	1,418 (RV)	± 3.3%	43%	41%	16%	2%
National Association of Independent Pollsters (Note: The association's members are Big Data Poll, InsiderAdvantage, Rasmussen Reports, & the Trafalgar Group.)	September 6–13, 2025	2,071 (LV)	± 2.0%	47%	46%	7%	1%
i360 (Note: Poll sponsored by Americans for Prosperity, a libertarian conservative political advocacy group)	September 10–12, 2025	577 (RV)	± 4.1%	35%	32%	33% (Note: "Other candidate" with 10%)	5%
Clarity Campaign Labs (D)	September 4–11, 2025	1,001 (RV)	± 3.1%	50%	44%	6%	6%
The Economist/YouGov	September 5–8, 2025	1,482 (RV)	± 3.1%	44%	40%	4%	2%
Public Religion Research Institute	August 15 – September 8, 2025	5,543 (A)	± 1.8%	33%	30%	36% (Note: "Would not vote" with 12%; "Other/third-party candidate" with 4%)	3%
Cygnal (R)	September 2–3, 2025	1,500 (LV)	± 2.5%	48%	45%	7%	3%
Yahoo News/YouGov	August 29 – September 2, 2025	1,136 (RV)	± 3.1%	44%	40%	16%	4%
The Economist/YouGov	August 29 – September 2, 2025	1,548 (RV)	± 3.0%	43%	39%	18%	4%
Survey 160	August 26 – September 1, 2025	– (RV)	± 5.8%	46%	39%	15%	7%
Morning Consult	August 29–31, 2025	2,202 (RV)	–	45%	41%	14%	4%
Emerson College	August 25–26, 2025	1,000 (RV)	± 3.0%	43%	43%	14%	Tie
McLaughlin & Associates (R)	August 21–26, 2025	1,000 (RV)	± 2.5%	45%	47%	8%	2%
The Economist/YouGov	August 22–25, 2025	1,374 (RV)	± 3.1%	43%	41%	16%	2%
Reuters/Ipsos	August 22–24, 2025	1,022 (A)	± 3.2%	38%	34%	28% (Note: "Will not/do not plan to vote" with 8%; "Candidate from another political party" with 4%; "Skipped" with 1%)	2%
SoCal Strategies (R) (Note: Poll sponsored by Red Eagle Politics & On Point Politics, both of which support Republicans)	August 19, 2025	700 (A)	–	42%	37%	21%	5%
RMG Research	August 18–21, 2025	2,000 (RV)	± 2.2%	44%	44%	12%	Tie
Strength In Numbers/Verasight	August 18–21, 2025	1,500 (A)	± 2.6%	49%	41%	10%	8%
Echelon Insights	August 14–18, 2025	1,057 (LV)	± 3.6%	47%	46%	7%	1%
The Argument/Verasight	August 18–21, 2025	1,562 (RV)	± 2.6%	45%	42%	13%	3%
The Argument/Verasight	August 18–21, 2025	1,562 (RV)	± 2.6%	51%	49%	–	2%
The Economist/YouGov	August 15–18, 2025	1,404 (RV)	± 3.2%	44%	39%	17%	5%
Quantus Insights (R)	August 11–13, 2025	1,000 (RV)	± 3.0%	45%	42%	13%	3%
The Economist/YouGov	August 9–11, 2025	1,473 (RV)	± 3.1%	42%	40%	18%	2%
The Economist/YouGov	August 1–4, 2025	1,528 (RV)	± 3.0%	44%	38%	18%	6%
Hart Research Associates (D)/ Public Opinion Strategies (R)	July 29 – August 3, 2025	1,000 (A)	± 3.1%	49%	44%	7%	5%
GrayHouse (R)	July 27–29, 2025	2,000 (RV)	± 2.7%	47%	44%	9%	3%
Yahoo News/YouGov	July 24–28, 2025	1,167 (RV)	± 3.1%	46%	39%	15%	7%
McLaughlin & Associates (R) (Note: Poll sponsored by America's New Majority Project)	July 21–24, 2025	2,000 (RV)	–	46%	43%	11%	3%
McLaughlin & Associates (R)	July 21–24, 2025	1,633 (LV)	–	48%	44%	8%	4%
Fabrizio (R)/Impact Research (D)	July 16–20, 2025	1,500 (RV)	± 2.5%	46%	43%	10% (Note: "Refused" with 1%)	3%
Emerson College	July 21–22, 2025	1,400 (LV)	± 2.5%	44%	42%	14%	2%
AtlasIntel	July 13–18, 2025	1,935 (A)	± 2.0%	51%	43%	6%	8%
Rasmussen Reports (R)	July 13–17, 2025	2,288 (LV)	± 2.0%	46%	42%	12%	4%
RMG Research	July 14–16, 2025	2,000 (RV)	± 2.2%	45%	49%	6%	4%
Big Data Poll (R)	July 12–14, 2025	3,022 (RV)	± 1.8%	42%	41%	17%	1%
Echelon Insights	July 10–14, 2025	1,084 (LV)	± 3.6%	47%	48%	5%	1%
Echelon Insights	July 10–14, 2025	1,084 (LV)	± 3.6%	45%	41%	14% (Note: America Party candidate with 5%)	4%
McLaughlin & Associates (R)	July 9–14, 2025	1,000 (LV)	± 2.5%	42%	47%	11%	5%
A2 Insights	July 7–10, 2025	862 (RV)	–	48%	44%	8%	4%
Strength In Numbers/Verasight	July 1–3, 2025	1,500 (A)	± 2.7%	47%	43%	10%	4%
Cygnal (R)	July 1–2, 2025	1,500 (LV)	± 2.5%	47%	46%	7%	1%
Emerson College	June 24–25, 2025	1,000 (LV)	± 3.0%	43%	40%	17%	3%
American Pulse Research & Polling (R)	June 23–25, 2025	633 (RV)	–	47%	42%	11% (Note: "Or Another Third Party Candidate" with 2%)	5%
Cygnal (R)	June 19–21, 2025	800 (LV)	± 3.5%	48%	46%	6%	2%
RMG Research	June 18–19, 2025	1,000 (RV)	± 3.1%	44%	52%	4%	8%
Echelon Insights	June 12–16, 2025	982 (LV)	± 3.8%	47%	48%	5%	1%
co/efficient (R)	June 12–16, 2025	1,035 (LV)	± 3.2%	46%	46%	8%	Tie
Clarity Campaign Labs (D)	June 5–14, 2025	1,000 (V)	± 3.1%	50%	45%	5%	5%
Strength In Numbers/Verasight	June 6–12, 2025	1,500 (A)	± 2.6%	45%	37%	18%	8%
Quantus Insights (R) (Note: Poll sponsored by Trending Politics, a conservative news website)	June 9–11, 2025	1,000 (RV)	± 3.0%	43%	43%	14%	Tie
Quantus Insights (R)	June 1–4, 2025	1,000 (RV)	± 3.0%	46%	45%	9%	1%
AtlasIntel	May 21–27, 2025	3,469 (A)	± 2.0%	51%	42%	7%	9%
McLaughlin & Associates (R)	May 21–26, 2025	1,000 (LV)	–	43%	47%	10%	4%
RMG Research	May 20–21, 2025	1,000 (RV)	± 3.1%	48%	45%	4%	3%
Fabrizio Ward (R) (Note: Poll sponsored by the Pinpoint Policy Institute)	May 15–19, 2025	800 (RV)	± 3.5%	42%	42%	16%	Tie
Echelon Insights	May 8–12, 2025	1,000 (LV)	± 3.8%	47%	48%	5%	1%
co/efficient (R)	May 7–9, 2025	1,462 (LV)	± 3.3%	45%	42%	10%	3%
Quantus Insights (R)	May 5–7, 2025	1,000 (RV)	± 3.0%	45%	45%	10%	Tie
Big Data Poll (R)	May 3–5, 2025	3,128 (RV)	± 1.8%	40%	42%	18%	2%
Strength In Numbers/Verasight	May 1–6, 2025	1,000 (A)	± 3.2%	47%	41%	12%	6%
NewsNation/DDHQ	April 23–27, 2025	1,448 (RV)	± 2.4%	45%	40%	15% (Note: "A third-party candidate" with 9%; "Would not vote" with 6%)	5%
New York Times/Siena College	April 21–24, 2025	913 (RV)	± 3.0%	47%	44%	9%	3%
Beacon Research (D)/ Shaw & Co. Research (R)	April 18–21, 2025	1,104 (RV)	± 3.0%	49%	42%	9%	7%
Noble Predictive Insights/ The Center Square	April 15–18, 2025	2,500 (LV)	± 2.0%	45%	42%	13%	3%
RMG Research	April 16, 2025	1,000 (RV)	± 3.1%	50%	45%	5%	5%
Hart Research Associates (D)/ Public Opinion Strategies (R)	April 9–13, 2025	– (RV)	–	45%	42%	13%	3%
RealClear Opinion Research	April 10–12, 2025	1,000 (RV)	± 3.0%	40%	39%	21%	1%
Cygnal (R)	April 1–3, 2025	1,500 (LV)	± 2.5%	48%	47%	5%	1%
Yale Youth Poll	April 1–3, 2025	4,100 (RV)	± 1.9%	43%	42%	15%	1%
Quantus Insights (R)	March 25–27, 2025	1,000 (RV)	± 3.5%	45%	46%	9%	1%
Echelon Insights	March 10–13, 2025	1,007 (LV)	± 3.5%	46%	47%	7%	1%
Hart Research Associates (D)/ Public Opinion Strategies (R)	March 7–11, 2025	1,000 (RV)	± 3.1%	48%	47%	5%	1%
Clarity Campaign Labs (D)	March 3–9, 2025	1,036 (V)	± 1.7%	46%	44%	10%	2%
Cygnal (R)	March 3–5, 2025	1,500 (LV)	± 2.5%	47%	46%	7%	1%
Emerson College	March 2–3, 2025	1,000 (RV)	± 3.0%	44%	41%	15%	3%
Public Opinion Strategies (R) (Note: Poll conducted for the Paragon Health Institute)	February 25 – March 2, 2025	1,000 (RV)	± 3.5%	44%	46%	10%	2%
RMG Research	February 20–21, 2025	1,000 (RV)	± 3.1%	46%	48%	6%	2%
co/efficient (R)	February 15–17, 2025	2,063 (LV)	± 3.4%	44%	46%	10%	2%
Echelon Insights	February 10–13, 2025	1,010 (LV)	± 3.6%	46%	47%	7%	1%
Quantus Insights (R)	February 10–12, 2025	1,000 (RV)	± 3.5%	44%	48%	8%	4%
Morning Consult	February 3–9, 2025	19,675 (RV)	–	43%	45%	12%	2%
Clarity Campaign Labs (D)	January 31 – February 6, 2025	1,102 (V)	± 1.5%	45%	44%	11%	1%
Cygnal (R)	February 4–5, 2025	1,500 (LV)	± 2.5%	46%	47%	7%	1%
Morning Consult	January 27 – February 2, 2025	19,675 (RV)	–	43%	44%	13%	1%
Fabrizio Ward (R)/ Impact Research (D) (Note: Poll sponsored by AARP)	January 27 – February 1, 2025	3,000 (RV)	± 1.8%	43%	43%	14%	Tie
Morning Consult	January 20–26, 2025	19,675 (RV)	–	42%	45%	13%	3%
Quantus Insights (R)	January 22–23, 2025	1,000 (RV)	± 3.5%	45%	48%	7%	3%
RMG Research	January 15–16, 2025	1,000 (RV)	± 3.1%	44%	51%	5%	7%
Cygnal (R)	January 9–12, 2025	1,500 (LV)	± 2.5%	45%	47%	8%	2%
McLaughlin & Associates (R)	December 11–16, 2024	1,000 (LV)	–	42%	47%	11%	5%
Cygnal (R)	December 9–11, 2024	1,500 (LV)	± 2.5%	45%	48%	7%	3%
