= Iglesias (surname) =

- Pronunciation: [iˈɣlesjas]

Origin
- Language: Spanish
- Meaning: Churches

Iglesias is a Spanish surname, meaning "churches".

== Notables with this name include ==
- The Iglesias family of Spain
    - Julio Iglesias (born 1943) singer, father of:
      - Chabeli Iglesias (born 1971), journalist, sister of Enrique and Julio José
      - Julio Iglesias Jr. (born 1973), pop singer and model
      - Enrique Iglesias (born 1975), musician
- Alberto Iglesias (born 1955), Spanish composer
- Enrique V. Iglesias (born 1931), Uruguayan economist
- Gabriel Iglesias (born 1976), American actor and comedian
- Gabriëlle Andrée Iglesias Velayos y Taliaferro (1933–2010), French landscape architect and garden writer, also a Dutch baroness
- Pablo Iglesias Simón (born 1977), Spanish theatre director, playwright, researcher, sound designer, and professor.
- Patricia Iglesias, Spanish and American mechanical engineer
- Ramiro Iglesias Leal (born 1925), Mexican scientist and medical doctor.

=== Political figures ===
- Dalmacio Iglesias García (1879–1933), Spanish Carlist politician
- David Iglesias (attorney) (born 1955), American attorney, U.S. Attorney for New Mexico 2002-06
- Fernando Iglesias (Argentine politician), Argentine writer and deputee
- Javier Iglesias (born 1969), Spanish politician
- José María Iglesias (1823–1891), Mexican lawyer, professor, journalist and liberal politician. Disputed 28th President of Mexico.
- Miguel Iglesias (1830–1909), Peruvian soldier, politician and president 1883-5.
- Pablo Iglesias Posse (1850–1925), Spanish socialist politician
- Pablo Iglesias Turrión (born 1978), Spanish politician and Secretary-General of Podemos
- Santiago Iglesias (1872–1939), Puerto Rican political activist, labor organiser and newspaper publisher

=== Sports figures ===
- David Cobeño Iglesias (born 1982), Spanish footballer
- José Iglesias (baseball), Cuban baseball player for the San Diego Padres
- Leonardo Andrés Iglesias (born 1979), Argentinian footballer
- Louis Iglesias (born 2008), French racing driver
- Raisel Iglesias, Cuban baseball player for the Cincinnati Reds
- Roniel Iglesias (born 1988), Cuban amateur boxer, Olympics medalist winner
- Borja Iglesias (born 1993), Spanish footballer

== See also ==
- Yglesias
