= Jerusalem Demsas =

Eritrean-American journalist (born 1995)

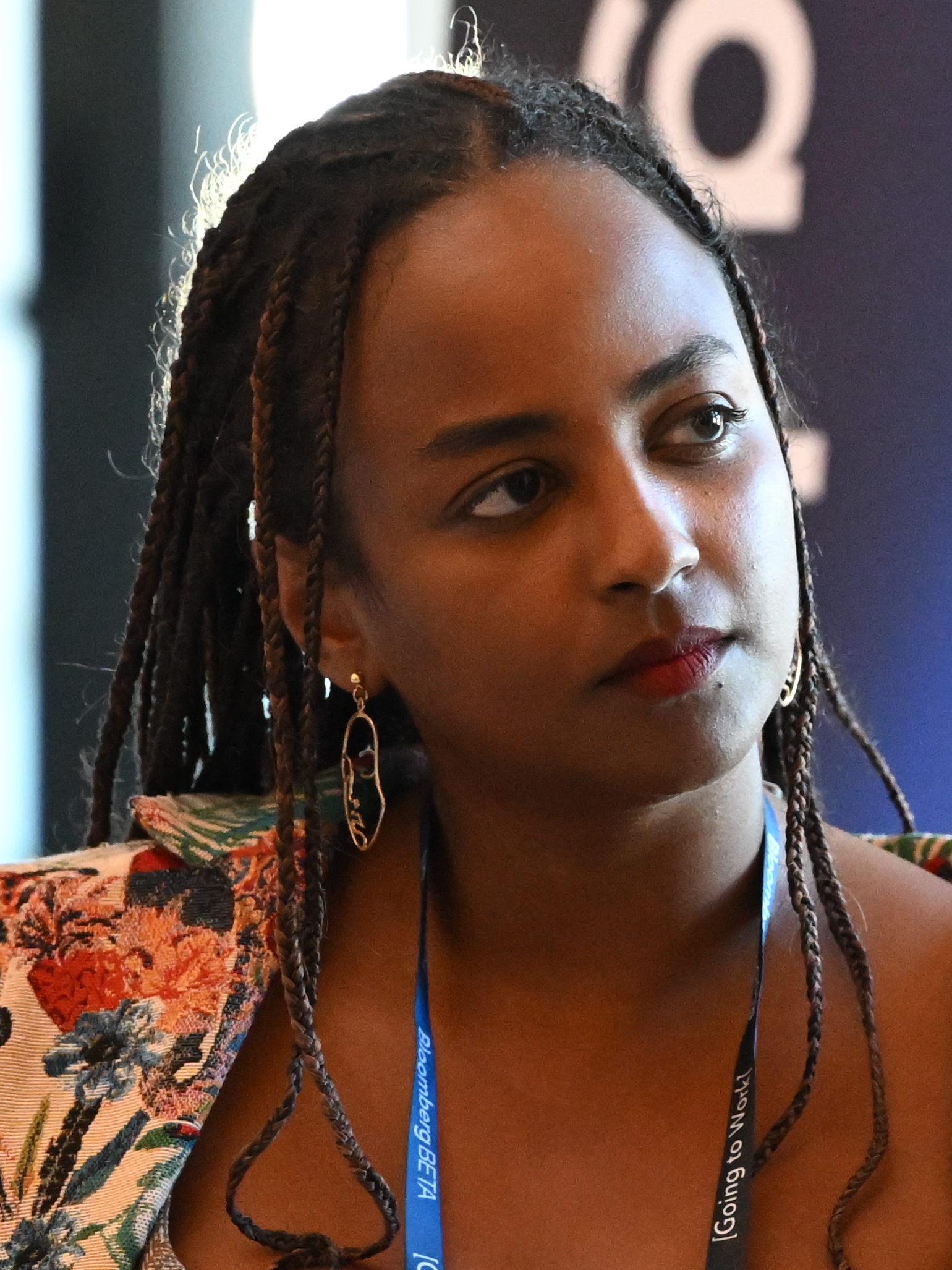
- Demsas in 2025
- Born: March 1995 (age 31); Ethiopia
- Education: College of William & Mary

Jerusalem Demsas (born March 1995) is an Eritrean-American journalist. She is the founder and editor of The Argument, an online media company.

Demsas is a former staff writer at The Atlantic. She writes about institutional failures, particularly as they affect the housing crisis in the United States.

== Early life and education ==
Demsas was born in Ethiopia to Eritrean parents. When she was three years old, her family left Ethiopia to escape war in the region and came to the United States as asylum seekers, settling in suburban Montgomery County, Maryland. She grew up there and attended Richard Montgomery High School. She was able to live in a "high opportunity area" with good schools and low crime due to the availability of low-cost housing. She says this has led to her commitment to the need for affordable housing.

She attended College of William & Mary, graduating with a degree in economics in 2017. She was on the College's debate team for four years, winning the Speaker of the Year award from the American Parliamentary Debate Association in her senior year, and served as the League's president for the 2016–17 school year.

== Career ==
After graduation, she worked as a staffer on political campaigns and did climate change policy research. This was followed by a writing stint on Vox, covering housing and policy. At Vox she co-hosted a podcast, The Weeds, discussing policy and politics. In 2022, she joined The Atlantic as a staff writer covering housing and the economy. She hosts The Atlantic's Good on Paper podcast, where popular narratives are challenged. Her work has led to multiple interviews concerning the housing crisis, including on Bloomberg, NPR, and Ezra Klein's New York Times interview. In 2023, she received the ASME Next Award from the American Society of Magazine Editors for journalists under 30. Also, in 2023 she became a visiting fellow at the Center for Economy and Society at the SNF Agora Institute and won the CHPC Insight Award.

In 2024, her essays on the housing crisis were collected into an anthology, On the Housing Crisis: Land, Development, Democracy. The book explores the impact of housing supply constraints and proposes solutions grounded in political science and economics. She states that in cities with insufficient housing, the most vulnerable (e.g. those struggling with economic instability, substance abuse or domestic violence) are often left without shelter. Additionally, she argues that simply making it easier for people to voice objections does not alter the balance of power; it merely amplifies the influence of those who already hold it. A Vox review stated that Demsas argues against incrementalism, arguing for "bolder intervention". A Bloomberg review stated that Demsas "has distinguished herself within the supply-side camp by zeroing in on the unlikely way that communities landed themselves in a housing crisis in the first place: From sea to shining sea, Americans voted for it."

=== Views ===
- Demsas believes the root cause of homelessness in the United States is the scarcity of affordable housing. "The crisis of homelessness is a crisis of homes."
- Homeownership has evolved in the U.S. to often turn homeowners against change, to oppose programs such as homeless shelters and transit systems in the neighborhoods.
- Housing is at the core of the economy and people's lives, leading her to call the housing crisis a national tragedy.
- In California, more housing needs to be built in dense urban areas, away from fire danger. But, "NIMBY gadflies" and anti-development Democrats have made it difficult to build anywhere.
- Too much democracy goes into community housing decisions with too little transparency and accountability; decisions have to go through multiple layers of "hyper-local" boards.
- Exclusionary zoning prevents the construction of affordable housing in wealthy neighborhoods.
- Racial discrimination in rental housing is found in most American cities.
