= One Billion Americans =

2020 book by Matthew Yglesias

One Billion Americans: The Case for Thinking Bigger
- Front cover to the first edition
- Author: Matthew Yglesias
- Language: English
- Publisher: Penguin Random House
- Publication date: September 15, 2020
- Publication place: United States
- Pages: 288
- ISBN: 978-0-593-19021-0

One Billion Americans: The Case for Thinking Bigger is a book by Matthew Yglesias, first published in 2020. One Billion Americans argues that America is not over-crowded and that the United States should aim to increase its population to 1 billion to counterbalance China and be "the greatest nation on Earth."

In order to support growth, Yglesias argues for a variety of programs, including increased government spending on child care and day care, the use of S-trains for urban transportation, and increased immigration to the United States, under the general rubric of increasing the American population. It suggests that a substantial increase to the population of the United States is necessary to perpetuate American hegemony. The book gives special attention to housing policy, critiquing zoning requirements that limit urban density in American cities.

== Critical response ==
Kirkus Reviews wrote that "the thesis is eminently arguable, but the book is packed full of provocative ideas well worth considering". Publishers Weekly called Yglesias's arguments about environmental impacts "not entirely convincing," but praised his proposals on immigration and cities, calling the book an optimistic call to action that is worth considering.

Jacob Bacharach panned One Billion Americans in a review for The New Republic, arguing that the policies it recommends are only loosely connected to Yglesias's central proposal to vastly increase the population of the United States. Felix Salmon, reviewing One Billion Americans for The New York Times, agreed that Yglesias's individual proposals were mostly good, but sees them as largely irrelevant to the aim of a vastly increased American population, which even Yglesias admits "may be impossible and absurd."

Barton Swaim of The Wall Street Journal had faint praise for Yglesias's pro-natalism, while damning his perceived hypocrisy in supporting a "left-liberal orthodoxy" that devalues the family and promotes excessive access to abortion and birth control and questioning his overall sincerity.

Nathan J. Robinson in Current Affairs called it "bizarre and deranged … utterly insane" of Yglesias to treat greater American power relative to China as a legitimate goal, saying it amounted to "a belief that United Statesians are superior to others and deserve more," and that Yglesias was unwilling to even consider that America was flawed and should have less power because he was "infected with the brain disease of nationalism." Conversely, Razib Khan in National Review praised Yglesias's "liberal nationalist" conviction that a strong and powerful America is good for the whole world, calling it "firmly in the traditional mainstream" versus the anti-patriotic taboos of leftist cultural elites; he did feel that Yglesias could have been more convincing in places, and seemed to take the implications of his proposals rather lightly.

== See also ==
- Demographic history of the United States
- Demographics of the United States
- Immigration to the United States
- People and organizations arguing that Canada should increase its population to 100 million:
  - Century Initiative
  - Doug Saunders, in his book Maximum Canada: Why 35 Million Canadians Are Not Enough (2017)
