= Rafael Yglesias =

American novelist and screenwriter (born 1954)

Rafael Yglesias (born May 12, 1954) is an American novelist and screenwriter best known for his novels Hide Fox, And All After and A Happy Marriage, which was awarded The Los Angeles Times Book Prize for fiction in 2010, as well as the 1993 movie Fearless, that he adapted from his own novel of the same name. He is the father of Nicholas and Matthew Yglesias. He is married to the novelist Ann Packer.

== Career ==
Yglesias was born in New York in 1954, son of novelist and journalist Jose Yglesias, and author Helen Yglesias. Doubleday published his first novel when he was seventeen. Two more followed before he began writing screenplays in 1980. In 1991, he adapted his seventh novel, Fearless. Fearless, directed by Peter Weir and starring Jeff Bridges, was critically acclaimed and led to Rosie Perez being nominated for an Academy Award for Best Supporting Actress for her role as Carla Rodrigo. The film was also entered into the 44th Berlin International Film Festival. Jeff Bridges' role as Max Klein is widely regarded as one of the best performances of his career. Yglesias' other screenplays include Death and the Maiden, directed by Roman Polanski and based on the play by Ariel Dorfman; Les Misérables, directed by Bille August and based on the novel by Victor Hugo, and From Hell, directed by the Hughes Brothers and based on the graphic novel by Alan Moore and Eddie Campbell. His film Dark Water is a remake of a J-horror film of the same name and was directed by Walter Salles.

Yglesias turned to television writing in the mid-2000s when, with screenwriter Tom Schulman, he adapted The Anatomy of Hope, a nonfiction book by Jerome Groopman about the psychological experience of illness, for HBO. The pilot was directed by J. J. Abrams but the network declined to move forward with a full series order.

In 2009 and in 2015, two of his most personal novels were published, A Happy Marriage, and The Wisdom of Perversity.

From 2014 to 2016, Yglesias worked on Aquarius, created by John McNamara and starring David Duchovny, ultimately writing five episodes of the two-season series.

== Novels ==
- Hide Fox, and All After
- The Work Is Innocent
- The Game Player
- Hot Properties
- Only Children
- The Murderer Next Door
- Fearless
- Dr. Neruda's Cure for Evil
- A Happy Marriage
- The Wisdom of Perversity
- Fabulous at Fifty
