= Helen Yglesias =

American novelist (1915–2008)

- Born: Helen Bassine; March 29, 1915; New York City
- Died: March 28, 2008 (aged 92); New York City
- Spouse(s): Bernard Cole; Jose Yglesias
- Children: 3, including Rafael Yglesias
- Relatives: Matthew Yglesias (grandson)
- Writing career
- Notable work: Sweetsir (1981)

Helen Bassine Yglesias (March 29, 1915 – March 28, 2008) was an American novelist.

== Early life ==
Yglesias was the youngest of seven children born to Solomon and Kate Bassine, both Yiddish-speaking immigrants of Polish-Jewish and Russian-Jewish origins who lived in the Pale Settlement. Her family moved (and lived) in an apartment in Fort Greene, Brooklyn. Solomon Bassine was the failed owner of several grocery stores. Helen wrote her first novel about a teenage girl in a New York City high school, on three notebooks on her kitchen table when she was a teenager herself. The book was never published, however, and, after high school, she worked at jobs selling underwear, stuffing envelopes, teaching ballroom dancing, and typing manuscripts. Yglesias worked as an editor at The Nation from 1965 to 1969, by which time she was a mother of 3.

== Career ==
Helen Yglesias was on the staff of The Daily Worker during the 1940s where she wrote books reviews and edited the cultural section of the paper. In 1964 she became a staff member of The Nation, and later served as its literary editor. Yglesias was also a member of the Newspaper Guild.

She started writing professionally when she was 54; her first published novel was How She Died (1972). The protagonist is Mary Moody Schwartz, the daughter of a Communist who was convicted of spying for the Soviet Union during the 1930s. According to the New York Times, it delved into "the roots of American radicalism, the story evolves into an account of one woman's struggle with cancer and the disorganized attempts of her family and friends to help her."

Arguably Yglesias' most famous work is Sweetsir (1981), a story about a man who was known for his womanizing traits and his cruelty toward his five wives. Set in a small New England town, the fifth wife had had enough of the cruelty and stabbed the husband to death. It goes on to tell of her trial and examines the idea of liberation.

For many years she lived and wrote in Brooklin, Maine.

== Political involvement ==
She joined the Young Communist League in 1936. She then left the Communist Party in 1952.

In 1968, she signed the "Writers and Editors War Tax Protest" pledge, vowing to refuse tax payments in protest against the Vietnam War.

== Death ==
Yglesias died on March 28, 2008, one day short of her 93rd birthday, in Manhattan of natural causes. She is survived by her daughter Tamar Cole, Lewis Cole, a son from her first marriage to Bernard Cole; and novelist and screenwriter Rafael Yglesias, a son from her second marriage to the novelist Jose Yglesias; and six grandchildren, including columnist Matthew Yglesias.

== Bibliography ==
=== Novels ===
- How She Died. Boston, Houghton Mifflin, 1972; London, Heinemann, 1973.
- Family Feeling. New York, Dial Press, 1976; London, Hodder and Stoughton, 1977.
- Sweetsir. New York, Simon and Schuster, and London, Hodder and Stoughton, 1981.
- The Saviors. Boston, Houghton Mifflin, 1987.
- The Girls. Harrison, New York, Delphinium Books, 1999.

=== Short stories ===
- "Semi-Private," in the New Yorker, 5 February 1972.
- "Kaddish and Other Matters," in the New Yorker, 6 May 1974.
- "Liar, Liar," in Seventeen (New York), February 1976.

=== Other ===
- Starting: Early, Anew, Over, and Late. New York, Rawson Wade, 1978.
- Isabel Bishop. New York, Rizzoli, 1989.
