= Matthew Yglesias =

American blogger and journalist (born 1981)

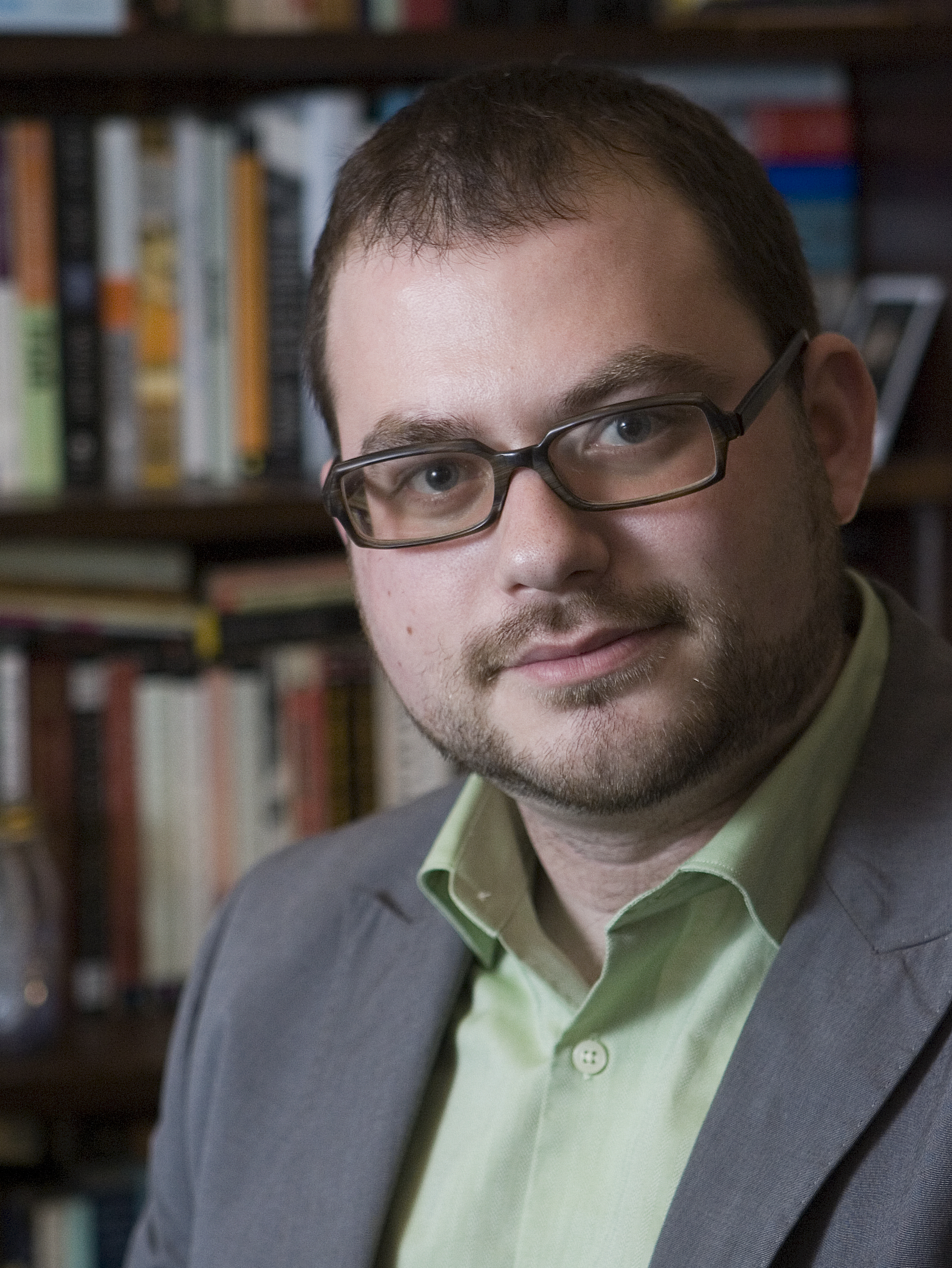
- Yglesias in 2008
- Born: May 18, 1981 (age 45); New York City, U.S.
- Education: Harvard University (BA)
- Occupations: Blogger; journalist
- Years active: 2002–present
- Employers: The American Prospect; The Atlantic; Slate; Vox
- Relatives: Rafael Yglesias (father)

Matthew Yglesias (/ɪˈɡleɪsiəs/ ih-GLAY-see-əs; born May 18, 1981) is an American blogger and journalist who writes about economics and politics. Yglesias has written columns and articles for publications such as The American Prospect, The Atlantic, and Slate. In 2014, he co-founded the news website Vox.

In November 2020, Yglesias left his position as an editor and columnist at Vox to publish the newsletter Slow Boring. In the same month, he joined the Niskanen Center as a senior fellow.

== Early life and education ==
Yglesias is the son of Rafael Yglesias, a screenwriter and novelist. His paternal grandfather, Jose Yglesias, was a novelist and journalist of Cuban and Spanish Galician descent, while his paternal grandmother, the novelist Helen Yglesias (née Bassine) was the daughter of Yiddish-speaking immigrants from the Russian-controlled portion of Poland. His mother, Margaret Joskow, was a daughter of Jules Joskow, who worked as president of National Economic Research Associates; the economist Paul Joskow is Yglesias's uncle. His maternal grandparents were also of Eastern European Jewish descent.

Yglesias grew up in Greenwich Village, Manhattan and went to high school at the Dalton School in New York City. He attended Harvard University, where he was editor in chief of The Harvard Independent and graduated in 2003 with a BA magna cum laude in philosophy. In 2001, he interned for Senator Chuck Schumer, reporting to communications director Bradley Tusk.

== Career ==
=== Early career ===
Yglesias started blogging in early 2002, while still in college, focusing mainly on American politics and public policy issues. While blogging, he came to know future Vox-collaborator Ezra Klein. Yglesias joined the American Prospect as a writing fellow upon his graduation in 2003, subsequently becoming a staff writer. His posts appeared regularly on the magazine's collaborative weblog TAPPED.

From June 2007 until August 2008, Yglesias was a staff writer at The Atlantic Monthly, and his blog was hosted on the magazine's website, The Atlantic. In July 2008, he announced that he would leave The Atlantic Monthly for the Center for American Progress where he wrote for its blog, ThinkProgress, because he missed "the sense of collegiality that comes from working with like-minded colleagues on a shared enterprise" and thought he could "help advance their mission." On November 21, 2011, he left ThinkProgress to work as a business and economics correspondent at Slate's Moneybox.

Andrew Sullivan, a fellow blogger, takes nominations on his blog for the Yglesias Award, an honor "for writers, politicians, columnists or pundits who actually criticize their own side, make enemies among political allies, and generally risk something for the sake of saying what they believe."

=== 2014–present ===
In February 2014, Yglesias left Slate and joined Vox Media to co-found Vox with Ezra Klein and Melissa Bell.

Yglesias authored the political nonfiction book One Billion Americans: The Case for Thinking Bigger, released on September 15, 2020. It was inspired by Doug Saunders's Maximum Canada.

On November 13, 2020, Yglesias announced that he would no longer be writing for Vox. Yglesias moved to the digital blogging and writing platform Substack, saying that he wanted more freedom than he had at Vox to challenge the "dominant sensibility" in the "young-college-graduate bubble", whose views, he felt, often clashed with those of "older people, and working-class people of all races and ethnicities". In relation to a former colleague at Vox, Emily St. James, who had disagreed with his signing of the Harper's Letter, Yglesias said: "It is an industry that's about ideas, and if you treat disagreement as a source of harm or personal safety, then it's very challenging to do good work." The title of his Substack newsletter Slow Boring is derived from Max Weber's 1919 essay "Politics as a Vocation", describing politics as a "strong and slow boring of hard boards".

In 2021, Yglesias's Twitter account was one of the most commonly followed by 150 Biden administration staff with public accounts. As of 2024, Yglesias was one of the highest-earning Substack writers, reportedly earning at least $1.4 million per year. Slow Boring employs a full-time editorial assistant and his wife Kate Crawford, the newsletter's managing editor.

=== Controversy ===
In 2013, after the 2013 Dhaka garment factory collapse, Yglesias argued against a "unified global standard for safety", writing that Bangladesh should have lower safety standards than rich countries, as the cost of higher standards is not feasible for poorer countries. He concluded: "The current system of letting different countries have different rules is working fine." His comments were widely criticized in The Daily Beast, Time, and other outlets. In The Guardian, Maha Rafi Atal wrote that "every worker deserves a workplace that is clean and safe, and the right to organize to protect themselves against abuses" and that Yglesias "is conflating the cost of a life with the cost of living, confusing a person's human worth with their socio-economic status". Yglesias stood by his original position, but clarified that in his view the problem was a matter of enforcing existing laws rather than strengthening them. He issued a correction to his original article, having referred to the building collapse as a fire.

In November 2018, Yglesias tweeted about a protest outside Tucker Carlson's home: "I honestly cannot empathize with Tucker Carlson’s wife at all — I agree that protesting at her house was tactically unwise and shouldn’t be done — but I am utterly unable to identify with her plight at any level." His expressed absence of empathy toward Carlson's wife caused controversy, and he deleted his past Twitter feed.

== Political views ==
In 2011, The Economist wrote that Yglesias espoused "left-leaning neoliberalism" in his writing. In 2017, Vice listed Yglesias among a group of political writers who were labelled "neoliberal shills" in left-wing Twitter communities. In 2019, Yglesias himself embraced the "chief neoliberal shill" label in The Neoliberal Podcast.

In or before 2010, Yglesias coined the term "pundit's fallacy" to denote "the belief that what a politician needs to do to improve his or her political standing is do what the pundit wants substantively."

Yglesias has been a long-time supporter of the YIMBY housing movement to address the US housing crisis. Former Vox colleague Ezra Klein credited Yglesias with a "huge, singular effect" in popularizing this position.

In May 2025, Yglesias criticized Senator Chris Murphy (D-CT) for advocating left-wing populism and calling for an end to neoliberalism. He characterized Murphy as engaging in "dog whistle moderation" for implying that Democrats are too "woke" without actually saying anything anti-woke. He has argued that Murphy's embrace of "pseudoeconomics" and targeted tariffs is exactly the wrong way to "broaden the Democratic tent". He has advocated for free trade and says that it is better to celebrate cheap goods as the key to prosperity and return to the more corporate-friendly, growth-oriented approach of the Clinton and Obama eras.

=== Foreign policy ===
In college, Yglesias initially supported the US invasion of Iraq. Calling his support for the war a "mistake" in 2010, Yglesias identified the reasons for this error as: a "predisposition in favor of military adventurism" based on an erroneous belief that the US was "unduly constrained" in the use of force by domestic politics; misplaced trust in elites such as Hillary Clinton, Joe Biden, Tony Blair and Kenneth M. Pollack; and a false assumption that the Bush administration's claim that Iraq had weapons of mass destruction was not a "massive, easily-debunked-after-the-fact lie". He concluded: "Being for the war was a way to simultaneously be a free-thinking dissident in the context of a college campus and also be on the side of the country's power elite. [...] it was a series of erroneous judgments about how to think about the world and who deserves to be taken seriously and under which circumstances."

In November 2023, Yglesias argued that Israel's war in Gaza was a "just war" while it simultaneously waged an "unjust war" in the West Bank, writing that the "humanitarian disaster is an inevitable consequence of waging war in a place with the population density of Philadelphia or Chicago", but denying that Israel was "deliberately targeting a civilian population center as a means of psychological warfare".

== Personal life ==
Yglesias is married to Kate Crawford. They met in 2008 and have one son together. Crawford is the editor of his Slow Boring newsletter and chief of staff at The Argument, an online magazine. She is also a former congressional staffer.

== Works ==
- Heads in the Sand: How the Republicans Screw Up Foreign Policy and Foreign Policy Screws Up the Democrats, Wiley, April 2008, ISBN 978-0-470-08622-3.
- "Long Philosophical Rant about Spider-Man 2", Ultimate blogs: masterworks from the wild Web, Editor Sarah Boxer, Random House, Inc., 2008, ISBN 978-0-307-27806-7
- "The Media", The 12-Step Bush Recovery Program, Gene Stone, Carl Pritzkat, Tony Travostino, Random House, Inc., 2008, ISBN 978-0-8129-8036-3
- The Rent Is Too Damn High, Simon and Schuster, March 2012, ASIN B0078XGJXO
- One Billion Americans: The Case for Thinking Bigger, Portfolio Penguin, September 2020, ISBN 978-0-593-19021-0.
