= The Argument (magazine) =

American liberal online magazine

- Website type: Online magazine, opinion
- Available in: English
- Headquarters: Washington, D.C., U.S.
- Owner: Independent
- Creator: Jerusalem Demsas
- Editor: Jerusalem Demsas
- Website: theargumentmag.com
- Commercial: Yes
- Launched: 2025
- Current status: Active

The Argument is an American online magazine that publishes commentary, analysis, and reported essays on politics, culture, and public policy from a liberal perspective. It is a Substack publication.

== History ==
The editor-in-chief of The Argument is Jerusalem Demsas (formerly of The Atlantic). The publication attempts to blend traditional opinion writing with analytical and explanatory journalism. It was designed to boost liberalism. According to early coverage in industry press, the site positioned itself as a space for slower, more reflective commentary amid fast-paced online news cycles. The left-leaning Revolving Door Project criticized The Argument, describing it as “a factional publication committed to pushing strict adherence to centrist orthodoxy," which Demsas contested.

Demsas raised over $4 million before starting the magazine. This was venture-capital funding, resulting in a $20 million valuation. The funders include Facebook cofounder Dustin Moskovitz; former Enron trader and current Meta energy and data center strategist John Arnold; a Pritzker family heir; a Niskanen Center board member; and Stripe cofounder Patrick Collison.

The publication features essays, longform commentary, and analytical pieces on American politics, education policy, culture, and social issues. Its staff writers, Jordan Weissmann and Kelsey Piper, are joined by contributions from writers like Matthew Yglesias, Derek Thompson and Lakshya Jain. The Argument's pieces frequently spotlight controversial or under-discussed issues, with a particular focus on Abundance-style content. Its writers also contribute political commentary to other news outlets, criticizing what it calls "post-liberal" Republicans.

As of 2025, Kate Crawford is The Argument's chief of staff. She is also Yglesias' wife.
