= G. Elliott Morris =

American journalist (born 1996)

- Born: George Elliott Morris; June 7, 1996 (age 30)
- Education: University of Texas at Austin (BA)
- Occupations: Data journalist Election forecaster
- Employer: FiftyPlusOne
- Website: gelliottmorris.com fiftyplusone.news

George Elliott Morris (born June 7, 1996) is an American data journalist who is best known for his work on election polling and predictive analytics. From 2018 to 2023, Morris was a data journalist for The Economist. From 2023 until 2025, he was the editorial director of data analytics at ABC News, overseeing FiveThirtyEight.

== Early life ==
Morris was born in 1996, one of three triplets. He graduated from the University of Texas at Austin in 2018, with undergraduate degrees in government and history. While still an undergraduate, Morris became the "breakout star of 2018 election forecasting" for his project models correctly predicting that the Democrats would regain the House.

== Career ==
After graduating from the University of Texas at Austin, Morris began working for The Economist. In February 2020, Morris referred to bad 2016 U.S. presidential election predictions as "lying to people" and "editorial malpractice". He later said that polls in 2016 did not account for education, meaning college educated voters were over-represented, which overstated the lead that Hillary Clinton actually had over Donald Trump.

In March 2020, Morris and The Economist published a forecast for the 2020 U.S. presidential election, the first major model predicting the election's outcome. On August 1, 2020, his model gave Joe Biden an 87 percent chance of winning the election, drawing criticism from Nate Silver of FiveThirtyEight who said: "I am not necessarily convinced. It's not just that polls could move. It's a question of, like, how well can pollsters predict turnout when the mechanics of voting have really changed?" Morris has had a public feud with Silver, leading to Silver blocking him on Twitter.

In May 2023, ABC News hired Morris to lead FiveThirtyEight as editorial director of data analytics following Silver's exit from the site. Prior to the 2024 elections, FiveThirtyEight gave Republicans a 9 in 10 chance to win control of the U.S. Senate, while the presidential and House elections were effectively tied in their models. After President Biden stepped down in his reelection bid, 538 model was taken offline for a month. This has led to speculation that the original model did not properly react to the decline in polling after the first 2024 Presidential debate. After being reactivated, the model correctly predicted Republicans winning the Senate, while Donald Trump won the presidential election with 312 electoral votes to Harris's 226, and Republicans retained the House 220–215.

Morris and the entire FiveThirtyEight staff were laid off when the site was shut down in March 2025. Two months later, Morris announced a newsletter, Strength in Numbers, which he said he intended to gradually expand into a successor to FiveThirtyEight. Later, in October, he launched FiftyPlusOne, a new website that aggregates polling data.

== Personal life ==
He took a paternity leave in 2026 for a few months, when his wife gave birth to their first child.

== Bibliography ==
- Strength in Numbers: How Polls Work and Why We Need Them (2022)

== See also ==
- Nate Cohn
