= Patricia Iglesias =

American mechanical engineer

Patricia Iglesias Victoria is a Spanish and American mechanical engineer and is an associate professor of mechanical engineering at the Rochester Institute of Technology. Her research has concerned tribology and the development of sustainable lubricants.

Iglesias has both an undergraduate degree and a doctorate from the Polytechnic University of Cartagena, and was a postdoctoral researcher at Purdue University before taking her present position at the Rochester Institute of Technology. She was elected as an ASME Fellow in 2025.
