= Pablo Iglesias Simón =

Spanish theatre director and playwright

- Born: 3 May 1977 (age 49); Madrid, Spain
- Occupations: theatre director playwright researcher sound designer professor

Pablo Iglesias Simón (born 3 May 1977) is a Spanish theatre director, playwright, researcher, sound designer, and professor.

== Biography ==
Iglesias has a degree in Stage Directing by RESAD and a PhD in Media by Universidad Complutense of Madrid.

In the theatrical field he has worked as theatre director, sound designer and playwright. He started staging plays of contemporary authors, such as Heiner Müller or Sarah Kane, but since 2002 he has been staging his own plays. In November 2009 it was the opening night of his last play “El lado oeste del Golden Gate” (“The West Side of the Golden Gate”) for whose staging he was awarded with the “José Luis Alonso” Award for the Best Young Director 2010. He has designed the sound of more than ten shows working for both public and private companies. He has published the plays “11-N”, “Sin móvil aparente” (“For no Apparent Reason”), finalist of the IIIrd “Teatro Exprés” Award 2002, “Alicia frente al espejo” (“Alice Facing the Mirror”), “Tu imagen sola” (“Your Lonely Picture”), written in collaboration with Borja Ortiz de Gondra and winner of the XIXth “Carlos Arniches-Ciudad de Alicante” Award 2003, “El lado oeste del Golden Gate” (“The West Side of the Golden Gate”), finalist of the XXXIIIrd Born Award 2008, and "Justo en medio del paralelo 38", finalist of the XXXVIth Born Award 2011.

He has taught film directing at the Universidad Complutense of Madrid and, nowadays, he is professor of stage directing at RESAD where he had taught the subjects Stage Directing Practice, History of Theatre and Sound for the Theatre.

He is now developing a research in theatre and cinema that has led him to give conferences in seminars in Spain, France and Chile, and to publish more than twenty articles in specialised magazines of Spain and Brazil. He has written two books, “Postproducción digital de sonido por ordenador”, republished in Mexico with the title “Postproducción digital de sonido por computadora”, and “De las tablas al celuloide” (“From the Stage to the Celluloid”), winner of the "Leandro Fernández de Moratín" Award for Theatrical Studies 2008. He has also taken part in the collective books “Análisis de la dramaturgia” and “Cinema i teatre: influències i contagis”.

== Published plays ==
- “Justo en medio del paralelo 38”. Madrid: Ediciones Antígona, 2013.
- “El lado oeste del Golden Gate”, ADE-Teatro. N. 125. April–June 2009. Pages. 104-123. English translation of Pablo Iglesias Simón’s The West Side Of The Golden Gate available
- "El lado oeste del Golden Gate". Madrid: Asociación de Autores de Teatro, 2009. ISBN 978-84-96837-15-7.
- “Alicia frente al espejo”, in VVAA. Maratón de Monólogos 2004. Madrid: Asociación de Autores de Teatro, 2004. Pages. 99-105. ISBN 84-88659-45-8.
- “Tu imagen sola”, written in collaboration with Borja Ortiz de Gondra. Alicante: Ayuntamiento de Alicante and XII Muestra de Teatro Español de Autores Contemporáneos, 2004. ISBN 84-931131-8-2.
- “11-N” in VVAA. Zona Cero. Ciudad Real: Instituto de la Juventud and Ñaque Editora, 2002. Pages. 24-55. ISBN 84-89987-44-0.
- “Sin móvil aparente” i VVAA. “Teatro 8. El huevo, Susana Sánchez; I am not that I am, David Graus; La piedra, Paco Becerra; Sin móvil aparente, Pablo Iglesias”. Madrid: Asociación de Autores de Teatro, 2003. Pages. 37-44.

== Awards ==
=== As theatre director ===
- "José Luis Alonso" Award for the Best Young Theatre Director 2010 for his staging of “El lado oeste del Golden Gate” (“The West Side of the Golden Gate”).

=== As playwright ===
- Finalist of the Born Award 2011 for the play “Justo en medio del paralelo 38”.
- Finalist of the Born Award 2008 for the play “El lado oeste del Golden Gate” (“The West Side of the Golden Gate”).
- Carlos Arniches – Ciudad de Alicante Award 2003 for the play “Tu imagen sola” (“Your lonely Image”), written in collaboration with Borja Ortiz de Gondra.
- Finalist of the Teatro Expres Award 2002 for the play “Sin móvil aparente” (“For No Apparent Reason”)

=== As theatre researcher ===
- "Leandro Fernández de Moratín" Award for Theatrical Studies 2008 for the book “De las tablas al celuloide” (“From the Stage to the Celluloid”).
- PhD Extraordinary Award for the thesis “Trasvases discursivos del teatro de finales del siglo XIX y de principios del XX al Cine Primitivo y al Cine Clásico de Hollywood” (“Discursive transfers from the theatre of the late ninetieth and the early twentieth century to the Early Film and Classical Hollywood Cinema”).
