= Jose Yglesias =

American novelist (1919–1995)

- Born: November 29, 1919; Ybor City, Tampa, Florida, U.S.
- Died: November 7, 1995 (aged 75); New York City, New York, U.S.
- Education: Black Mountain College

Jose Yglesias (November 29, 1919 – November 7, 1995) was an American novelist and journalist.

== Life and career ==
Yglesias was born in the Ybor City district of Tampa, Florida. His father was from the Spanish region of Galicia and his mother was a native of Cuba. He moved to New York City in 1937 and served in the United States Navy during World War II. He studied at Black Mountain College and was a film critic for the Communist Party USA newspaper The Daily Worker. He lived in New York City and Brooklin, Maine. From 1953 to 1963 he held an executive position at the pharmaceutical company Merck Sharp and Dohme.

He published fifteen books and wrote articles for The New Yorker, Esquire, The New York Times Magazine and other periodicals. In 1968, he signed the "Writers and Editors War Tax Protest" pledge, vowing to refuse tax payments in protest against the Vietnam War.

Yglesias was the patriarch of a writing family, which in addition to his son, the novelist and screenwriter Rafael Yglesias, included his wife, Helen Yglesias, a novelist and editor, as well as his grandsons, the journalist Matthew Yglesias and the novelist Nicholas Yglesias. He died on November 7, 1995, at Beth Israel Hospital in New York City from cancer.

== Works ==
All descriptions of works come from the author's 1995 New York Times obituary.

- A Wake in Ybor City (1963), "about Cubans who immigrated to Florida"
- The Goodbye Land (1967), "about Galicia, his father's native province in Spain"
- In the Fist of the Revolution (1968), "an intimate view of Mayari [sic], a small country town in Cuba, under the rule of Fidel Castro"
- An Orderly Life (1968)
- Down There (1970), "deals with the lives of people in Brazil, Cuba, Chile and Peru"
- The Truth About Them (1971)
- Double Double (1974)
- The Kill Price (1976)
- The Franco Years (1977), described by New York Times critic John Leonard as "a modest and extremely interesting series of interviews, filtered through a sympathetic intelligence [with people] who managed to survive Franco's dreary rule"
- Home Again
- Tristan and the Hispanics (1989), "centered on a man who was the most famous Latin American writer of his generation"
- Widower's Walk (1996)
- The Guns In The Closet (1996), collected stories
- The Old Gents (1996)
- Break In (1996)

== See also ==
- List of Cuban American writers
