= Amusing Ourselves to Death =

1985 book by Neil Postman

Amusing Ourselves to Death: Public Discourse in the Age of Show Business
- Author: Neil Postman
- Language: English
- Subject: Media ecology
- Publisher: Viking Penguin (US), Methuen Publishing (UK)
- Publication date: 1985
- Media type: Print
- Pages: 184
- ISBN: 0670804541
- Dewey Decimal: 302.2/34
- LC Class: P94.P63 1985

Amusing Ourselves to Death: Public Discourse in the Age of Show Business (1985) is a book by American sociologist and mass media scholar Neil Postman. In 2005, Postman's son Andrew reissued the book in a 20th anniversary edition.

== Origins ==
The book's origins are rooted in a talk Postman gave to the Frankfurt Book Fair in 1984, in which he was a participant in a panel on George Orwell's 1984 and the contemporary world. In the introduction to Amusing Ourselves to Death, Postman said that the contemporary world was better reflected by Aldous Huxley's Brave New World, whose public was oppressed by their addiction to amusement, rather than by Orwell's work, where they were oppressed by state violence.

== Summary ==
Postman distinguishes the Orwellian vision of the future, in which totalitarian governments seize individual rights, from that offered by Aldous Huxley in Brave New World, where people medicate themselves into bliss, thereby voluntarily sacrificing their rights. Drawing an analogy with the latter scenario, Postman sees television's entertainment value as a present-day soma, the fictitious pleasure drug in Brave New World, by means of which the citizens' rights are exchanged for consumers' entertainment.

The essential premise of the book, which Postman extends to the rest of his arguments, is that "form excludes the content"; that is, a particular medium can only sustain a particular level of ideas. Thus rational argument, integral to print typography, is militated against by the medium of television for this reason. Owing to this shortcoming, politics and religion are diluted, and "news of the day" becomes a packaged commodity. Television de-emphasizes the quality of information in favor of satisfying the far-reaching needs of entertainment, by which information is encumbered and to which it is subordinate.

Postman asserts the presentation of television news is a form of entertainment programming; arguing that the inclusion of theme music, the interruption of commercials, and "talking hairdos" bear witness that televised news cannot readily be taken seriously. Postman further examines the differences between written speech, which he argues reached its prime in the early to mid-19th century, and the forms of televisual communication, which rely mostly on visual images to "sell" lifestyles. He argues that, owing to this change in public discourse, politics has ceased to be about a candidate's ideas and solutions, but whether he comes across favorably on television. Television, he notes, has introduced the phrase "now this", which implies a complete absence of connection between the separate topics the phrase ostensibly connects. Larry Gonick used this phrase to conclude his Cartoon Guide to (Non)Communication, instead of the traditional "the end".

Postman refers to the inability to act upon much of the so-called information from televised sources as the information-action ratio. He contends that "television is altering the meaning of 'being informed' by creating a species of information that might properly be called disinformation—misplaced, irrelevant, fragmented or superficial information that creates the illusion of knowing something but which in fact leads one away from knowing".

Drawing on the ideas of media scholar Marshall McLuhan – altering McLuhan's aphorism "the medium is the message" to "the medium is the metaphor" – he describes how oral, literate, and televisual cultures radically differ in the processing and prioritization of information; he argues that each medium is appropriate for a different kind of knowledge. The faculties requisite for rational inquiry are simply weakened by televised viewing. Accordingly, reading, a prime example cited by Postman, exacts intense intellectual involvement, at once interactive and dialectical; whereas television only requires passive involvement.

Postman argues that commercial television has become derivative of advertising. Moreover, modern television commercials are not "a series of testable, logically ordered assertions" rationalizing consumer decisions, but "is a drama—a mythology, if you will—of handsome people" being driven to "near ecstasy by their good fortune" of possessing advertised goods or services. "The truth or falsity of an advertiser's claim is simply not an issue" because more often than not "no claims are made, except those the viewer projects onto or infers from the drama." Because commercial television is programmed according to ratings, its content is determined by commercial feasibility, not critical acumen. Television in its present state, he says, does not satisfy the conditions for honest intellectual involvement and rational argument.

He repeatedly states that the 18th century, the "Age of Reason", was the pinnacle for rational argument. Only in the printed word, he states, could complicated truths be rationally conveyed. Postman gives a striking example: many of the first fifteen U.S. presidents could probably have walked down the street without being recognized by the average citizen, yet all these men would have been quickly known by their written words. However, the reverse is true today. The names of presidents or even famous preachers, lawyers, and scientists call up visual images, typically television images, but few, if any, of their words come to mind. The few that do almost exclusively consist of carefully chosen soundbites. Postman mentions Ronald Reagan, and comments upon Reagan's abilities as an entertainer.

== Release ==
The book has been translated into 16 languages (Spanish, Turkish, German, Vietnamese, Italian, Persian, Chinese, Czech, French, Romanian, Polish, Finnish, Greek, Norwegian, Dutch, Swedish) and sold some 200,000 copies worldwide.

== Influence ==
Roger Waters's 1992 album Amused to Death is named after Postman's book, and is in part inspired by and deals with some of the same subject matter. In The End of Education, Postman remarked that the album's reference to his work,

...so elevated my prestige among undergraduates that I am hardly in a position to repudiate him or his kind of music. Nor do I have the inclination for any other reason. Nonetheless, the level of sensibility required to appreciate the music of Roger Waters is both different and lower than what is required to appreciate, let us say, a Chopin étude.

Postman's concept of the "information-action ratio" was referenced in the Arctic Monkeys song "Four Out of Five" off the band's 2018 album Tranquility Base Hotel & Casino, where the Information Action Ratio is the name of a fictional taqueria on the moon.

In a 2019 interview with Kjersti Flaa, comic and actor Zach Galifianakis references Amusing Ourselves to Death with the line "you will stop hearing the term 'big brother' because we will do it to ourselves." Galifianakis employed the quotation in response to a question the interviewer asked about whether or not he uses social media, to which he replied with a denunciation of the negative effects of the internet on society in general.

== See also ==
- B-Television
- Bread and circuses
- Infotainment
- Media criticism

=== Similar works ===
- Bowling Alone
- Capitalist Realism
- The End of Education
- Four Arguments for the Elimination of Television, 1978 critique of television by Jerry Mander
- The Global Trap
- Is Google Making Us Stupid?
- Manufacturing Consent
- Network (1976 film), satire of television news as entertainment
- One-Dimensional Man
- The Plug-In Drug, 1977 critique of television by Marie Winn
