= Technopoly =

1992 book by Neil Postman

Technopoly: The Surrender of Culture to Technology
- Original paperback version cover
- Author: Neil Postman
- Language: English
- Subject: Technology and society
- Published: 1992
- Publication place: United States
- Media type: Print (Paperback and Hardcover)

Technopoly: The Surrender of Culture to Technology is a book by Neil Postman published in 1992 that describes the development and characteristics of a "technopoly". He defines a technopoly as a society in which technology is deified, meaning "the culture seeks its authorisation in technology, finds its satisfactions in technology, and takes its orders from technology". It is characterised by a surplus of information generated by technology, which technological tools are in turn employed to cope with, in order to provide direction and purpose for society and individuals.

Postman considers technopoly to be the most recent of three kinds of cultures distinguished by shifts in their attitude towards technology – tool-using cultures, technocracies, and technopolies. Each, he says, is produced by the emergence of new technologies that "compete with old ones…mostly for dominance of their worldviews".

== Tool-using culture ==
According to Postman, a tool-using culture employs technologies only to solve physical problems, as spears, cooking utensils, and water mills do, and to "serve the symbolic world" of religion, art, politics and tradition, as tools used to construct cathedrals do. He claims that all such cultures are either theocratic or "unified by some metaphysical theory", which forced tools to operate within the bounds of a controlling ideology and made it "almost impossible for technics to subordinate people to its own needs".

== Technocracy ==
In a technocracy, rather than existing in harmony with a theocratic world-view, tools are central to the "thought-world" of the culture. Postman claims that tools "attack culture…[and] bid to become culture", subordinating existing traditions, politics, and religions. Postman cites the example of the telescope destroying the Judeo-Christian belief that the Earth is the centre of the Solar System, bringing about a "collapse…of the moral centre of gravity in the West".

Postman characterises a technocracy as compelled by the "impulse to invent", an ideology first advocated by Francis Bacon in the early 17th Century. He believed that human beings could acquire knowledge about the natural world and use it to "improve the lot of mankind", which led to the idea of invention for its own sake and the idea of progress. According to Postman, this thinking became widespread in Europe from the late 18th Century.

However, a technocratic society remains loosely controlled by social and religious traditions, he clarifies. For instance, he states that the United States remained bound to notions of "holy men and sin, grandmothers and families, regional loyalties and two-thousand-year-old traditions" at the time of its founding.

== Technopoly ==
Postman defines technopoly as a "totalitarian technocracy", which demands the "submission of all forms of cultural life to the sovereignty of technique and technology". Echoing Jacques Ellul's 1964 conceptualisation of technology as autonomous, "self-determinative" independently of human action, and undirected in its growth, technology in a time of Technopoly actively eliminates all other ‘thought-worlds’. Thus, it reduces human life to finding meaning in machines and technique.

This is exemplified, in Postman's view, by the computer, the "quintessential, incomparable, near-perfect" technology for a technopoly. It establishes sovereignty over all areas of human experience based on the claim that it "'thinks' better than we can".

=== Values of "technological theology" ===
A technopoly is founded on the belief that technique is superior to lax, ambiguous and complex human thinking and judgement, in keeping with one of Frederick W. Taylor’s ‘Principles of scientific management’. It values efficiency, precision, and objectivity.

It also relies upon the "elevation of information to a metaphysical status: information as both the means and end of human creativity". The idea of progress is overcome by the goal of obtaining information for its own sake. Therefore, a technopoly is characterised by a lack of a cultural coherence or a "transcendent sense of purpose or meaning".

Postman attributes the origins of technopoly to ‘scientism’, the belief held by early social scientists including Auguste Comte that the practices of natural and social science would reveal the truth of human behaviour and provide "an empirical source of moral authority".

=== Consequences of technopoly ===
Postman refers to Harold Innis’ concept of "knowledge monopolies" to explain the manner in which technology usurps power in a technopoly. New technologies transform those who can create and use them into an "elite group", a knowledge monopoly, which is granted "undeserved authority and prestige by those who have no such competence". Subsequently, Postman claims, those outside of this monopoly are led to believe in the false "wisdom" offered by the new technology, which has little relevance to the average person.

Telegraphy and photography, he states, redefined information from something that was sought out to solve particular problems to a commodity that is potentially irrelevant to the receiver. Thus, in technopoly, "information appears indiscriminately, directed at no one in particular, in enormous volume at high speeds, and disconnected from theory, meaning, or purpose".

In the U.S. technopoly, excessive faith and trust in technology and quantification has led to absurdities such as an excess of medical tests in lieu of a doctor's judgment, treatment-induced illnesses (‘iatrogenics’), scoring in beauty contests, an emphasis on exact scheduling in academic courses, and the interpretation of individuals through "invisible technologies" like IQ tests, opinion polls, and academic grading, which leave out meaning or nuance. If bureaucracies implement their rules in computers, it can happen that the computer's output is decisive, the original social objective is treated as irrelevant, and the prior decisions about what the computer system says are not questioned in practice when they should be. The author criticizes the use of metaphors that characterize people as information-processing machines or vice versa—e.g. that people are "programmed" or "de-programmed" or "hard-wired", or "the computer believes ..."; these metaphors are "reductionist".

A technopoly also trivialises significant cultural and religious symbols through their endless reproduction. Postman echoes Jean Baudrillard in this view, who theorises that "technique as a medium quashes … the ‘message’ of the product (its use value)", since a symbol's "social finality gets lost in seriality".

== Criticism of Technopoly ==
=== Technological determinism ===
Postman's argument stems from the premise that the uses of a technology are determined by its characteristics – "its functions follow from its form". This draws on Marshall McLuhan's theory that "the medium is the message" because it controls the scale and form of human interaction. Hence, Postman claims that once introduced, each technology "plays out its hand", leaving its users to be, in Thoreau's words, "tools of our tools".

According to Mary Tiles and Hans Oberdiek, this pessimistic understanding of pervasive technology renders individuals "strangely impotent". David Croteau and William Hoynes criticise such technologically deterministic arguments for underestimating the agency of a technology's users. Russell Neuman suggests that ordinary people skilfully organise, filter, and skim information, and actively “seek out” information rather than feeling overwhelmed by it.

It has also been argued that technologies are shaped by social factors more so than by their inherent properties. Star suggests that Postman neglects to account for the "actual development, adaptation and regulation of technology".

=== Values ===
According to Tiles and Oberdiek, pessimistic accounts of technology overriding culture are based on a particular vision of human values. They emphasise "artistic creativity, intellectual culture, development of interpersonal relations, or religion as being the realms in which human freedom finds expression and in which human fulfilment is to be found". They suggest that technological optimists merely adhere to an alternative worldview that values the "exercise of reason in the service of free will" and the ability of technological developments to "serve human ends".

=== Science and ideology ===
Postman's characterisation of technology as an ideological being has also been criticised. He refers to the "god" of technopolists speaking of "efficiency, precision, objectivity", and hence eliminating the notions of sin and evil which exist in a separate "moral universe". Stuart Weir argues that technologies are "not ideological beings that take…near-anthropomorphic control of people’s loves, beliefs and aspirations". He in fact suggests that new technologies have had remarkably little effect on pre-existing human beliefs.

=== Persistence of old world ideologies ===
Postman speaks of technological change as "ecological…one significant change generates total change". Hence, technopoly brought about by communications technologies must result in a drastic change in the beliefs of a society, such that prior "thought worlds" of ritual, myth, and religion cannot exist. Star conversely argues that new tools may create new environments, but do "not necessarily extinguish older beliefs or the ability to act pragmatically upon them".

== Reviews ==
Gonzaga University professor Paul De Palma wrote for the technology journal ACM SIGCAS Computers and Society in March 1995 praising "the elegant little book". He also remarked:

Postman makes a good, if not entirely sufficient argument... The next time that you're lost in cyberspace, wondering if all of this information has made us wiser, kinder, happier, pick up Postman's book. It's a healthy defense against the blather about computer technology that you'll find in the morning paper or on the evening news.

== See also ==
- The Cult of the Amateur
- Amusing Ourselves to Death
- An Army of Davids
- The Global Trap

== Notes ==
=== References ===
- Baudrillard, Jean (2001). "Symbolic exchange and death". In Mark Poster (ed.). Jean Baudrillard: Selected Writings (2nd ed.). Stanford University Press. ISBN 978-0-8047-4273-3.
- Croteau, David; Hoynes, William (2003). Media Society: Industries, Images and Audiences (3rd ed.). Thousand Oaks: Pine Forge Press. ISBN 978-0-7619-8773-4.
- De Palma, Paul (1995). "Book Review: Technopoly: The Surrender of Culture to Technology by Neil Postman". ACM SIGCAS Computers and Society. 25 (1): 18–20. doi:10.1145/202481.583860. S2CID 37495148.
- McLuhan, Marshall; Fiore, Quentin (1967). The Medium is the Massage. San Francisco: Hardwired.
- Penny, Simon (1997). "Review". Leonardo. 30 (1).
- Postman, Neil (1993). Technopoly: The Surrender of Culture to Technology. New York: Vintage Books. ISBN 978-0-679-74540-2.
- Star, Alexander (1992). "Machine Dreams". The New Republic. Vol. 207, no. 5.
- Tiles, Mary; Oberdiek, Hans (1995). Living in a Technological Culture: Human Tools and Human Values. New York: Routledge. ISBN 978-0-415-07101-7.
- Weir, Stuart (1992). "Apocalypse, Wow". The Nation. 255 (6).
