= The Plug-In Drug =

The Plug-In Drug: Television, Children, And The Family
- First edition
- Author: Marie Winn
- Language: English
- Publisher: Viking Press
- Publication date: 1977
- Media type: Print
- ISBN: 0140076980

The Plug-In Drug: Television, Children, And The Family is a book of social criticism written by Marie Winn and published in 1977 by Viking Press. In it, Winn brought the communications medium of television under withering fire, accusing it of wielding an addictive influence on the very young.

Winn wrote:

"The very nature of the television experience apart from the contents of the programs is rarely considered. Perhaps the ever-changing array of sights and sounds coming out of the machine--the wild variety of images meeting the eye and the barrage of human and inhuman sounds reaching the ear--fosters the illusion of a varied experience for the viewer. It is easy to overlook a deceptively simple fact: one is always watching television when one is watching television rather than having any other experience."

A 25th-anniversary revision was published in 2002, which included new material that was subtitled "Television, Computers, And Family Life". Winn was even more hostile to the Internet and the World Wide Web than she had been to television itself twenty-five years before.

== See also ==
- Four Arguments for the Elimination of Television, 1978 critique of television by Jerry Mander
- Amusing Ourselves to Death, 1985 critique of television by Neil Postman
