= Four Arguments for the Elimination of Television =

1978 book by Jerry Mander

- First edition
- Author: Jerry Mander
- Language: English
- Genre: Non-fiction
- Publisher: William Morrow and Company
- Publication date: 1978

Four Arguments for the Elimination of Television is a 1978 book by Jerry Mander, "who argues that many of the problems with television are inherent in the medium and technology itself, and thus cannot be reformed".

Mander was an advertiser for 15 years, with five of them as a president and partner of Freeman, Mander, & Gossage, a San Francisco advertising agency.

== Background ==
This is the first book that collects information from various sources to determine how the wide availability of television affects society. Mander believes that "television and democratic society are incompatible" due to television removing all of society's senses except for seeing and hearing. The author states that television makes it so that people have no common sense which leads to, as Cornell University professor Rose K. Golden wrote for the journal Contemporary Sociology, being "powerless to reject the camera's line of sight, reset the stage, or call on our own sensory apparatus to correct the doctored sights and sounds the machine delivers". Mander's four arguments in the book to eliminate television are that telecommunication removes the sense of reality from people, television promotes capitalism, television can be used as a scapegoat, and that all three of these issues negatively work together.

A 1979 review of the book from The Cambridge Quarterly stated that 99% of American homes had a television with millions of people watching it for several hours per day. Mander stated that television audiences are "either a wanton debasement of values or a towering obstacle to social change" while others have wanted to protest for changes to television programs, its controllers, and its bad effects. The thesis is that "reform is impossible" due to television and that all television should be abolished. The author came to his conclusion while he was working in advertising for 15 years. The book's sources include his own life experience, science fiction, and Zen.

== Reception ==
Michael Comber of The Cambridge Quarterly disagreed with Mander's arguments, stating that television has room for multiple ideologies and that "technology need not be viewed as a monolithic ogre, outside our control, incapable of reform, and at best fit for only elimination". However, Comber concluded the review with, "In order to transform television, one must first understand how television works. To this understanding Mander's book makes a useful contribution." Kirkus Reviews wrote, "In the end, the author admits the dominant position of TV in our society and concedes he has no earthly idea of how to bring about its demise. It might be termed an exercise in futility were it not for the intriguing notions it offers." In his 1985 book Amusing Ourselves to Death, Neil Postman, another notable critic of television, dismissed Mander's arguments as "preposterous notions" and a "straight Luddite position", because "Americans will not shut down any part of their technological apparatus, and to suggest that they do so is to make no suggestion at all".

== See also ==
- History of television
- "Is Google Making Us Stupid?"
- Luddites as an example of a social movement which opposed specific applications of technology on political and social class grounds.
- Media psychology
- The Plug-In Drug, 1977 critique of television by Marie Winn
- Screen-Free Week
- Social aspects of television
- Television and the Public Interest
- Television studies
- The Shallows
- The medium is the message
- Quality television
