= Koohan Paik-Mander =

American activist

- Born: Koohan Paik; 1961 (age 64–65); Los Angeles, U.S.
- Education: University of Southern California (BA); New York University (MFA)
- Occupations: Activist; author
- Spouse: Jerry Mander (m. 2009)

Koohan Paik-Mander (b. 1961) is an American journalist, author, filmmaker, media educator, and peace and environmental activist. Based in Hawaii, her work focuses heavily on the intersections of militarism, environmental degradation and technology within the Asia-Pacific region.

== Early life and education ==
Paik-Mander was born to a Korean immigrant father and a Quaker-Jewish mother in Los Angeles, California in 1961. During her early childhood in the 1960s, her family relocated to South Korea under the regime of Park Chung-hee. In the 1970s, the family moved again to the U.S. territory of Guam so that her father could practice law. Growing up in postwar Korea and on Guam shaped her perspective on geopolitics, indigenous sovereignty, and militarism.

She earned a B.A. in media studies from the University of Southern California and a M.F.A. in dramatic writing from New York University.

== Career ==
Paik-Mander has spent decades organizing and campaigning against military buildup and its consequences in the Pacific. In the early 2000s, she was a founding member of the Kauai Alliance for Peace and Social Justice, which scrutinized the role of Kauai in U.S. military operations.

From 2011 to 2016, she served as the Campaign Director of the Asia-Pacific program at the International Forum on Globalization (IFG). While there, she coordinated the 2011 and 2013 Moana Nui public teach-ins, bringing together activists, scholars, attorneys, and indigenous cultural practitioners to address urgent environmental and social threats facing the Asia-Pacific region.

Paik-Mander is a co-founder of the Tech Critics Network and frequently addresses the dangers of automated warfare. She actively lectures and writes on topics such as the arms race, digital technologies, and the nuclear legacy of artificial intelligence.

She holds several leadership and advisory roles in global peace organizations, serving on the boards of: The Global Network Against Weapons and Nuclear Power in Space, World BEYOND War, The CODEPINK working group, "China Is Not Our Enemy" and The advisory committee for the Global Just Transition project at Foreign Policy in Focus. As Director of Development at Hawaii Alliance for Progressive Action (HAPA) she advocated for traditional stewardship of natural resources and resisting the continuing urban sprawl of luxury developments in Hawaii. Prior to 2012, she had resided on Kauai for 20 years. While on that island, she taught media literacy at a charter school on Kauai's west side that serves the local Niihau community.

=== Writing and filmmaking ===
As a freelance journalist, Paik-Mander's commentary and reporting have appeared in numerous publications, including The Nation, The Progressive, Foreign Policy in Focus, Asia Times, Common Dreams, ColorLines and YES! Magazine.

Her investigative piece titled “Whales Will Save the World's Climate — Unless the Military Destroys Them First” received significant recognition when it was named by Project Censored as one of the top 25 censored stories of 2021–2022.

Additionally, her work as a filmmaker has garnered awards at various international festivals, including the Berlin International Film Festival and NY Exposition of Short Film & Video. Her work slo focuses on environmental and cultural issues, including a docudrama of a Hawaiian-language literary classic, The True Story of Kaluaikoolau, and La Vendemmia, a visual ode to traditional Sicilian winemaking, which was included in the 2007 Mediterranean Environmental Award media festival. Her YouTube film, Discover Kauai, is credited with galvanizing the environmental movement on Kauai.

=== Political career ===
In 2018, Koohan Paik-Mander challenged incumbent Representative Mark Nakashima in the Democratic primary of the Hawaii House of Representatives election for Hawaii's 1st House District, which encompasses the Hamakua and North/South Hilo regions. Running as a progressive challenger, her platform heavily emphasized grassroots civic engagement, environmental protection, and local economic revitalization.

Paik-Mander lost the primary election to Nakashima, receiving 27.9% of the vote (1,711 votes) to the incumbent's 72.1% (4,413 votes). Because the district lacked a Republican challenger, Nakashima went on to win the general election uncontested.

== Personal life ==
She was married to activist Jerry Mander until his death in 2023. She has been a resident of Kukuihaele, Hawaii.

== Works ==
- The Superferry Chronicles: Hawaii’s Uprising Against Militarism, Commercialism, and the Desecration of the Earth, with Jerry Mander, Koa Books (2008) ISBN 978-0-9773338-8-2
