= Relevance =

Useful connection between topics

Relevance is the connection between topics that makes one useful for dealing with the other. Relevance is studied in many different fields, including cognitive science, logic, and library and information science. Epistemology studies it in general, and different theories of knowledge have different implications for what is considered relevant.

== Definition ==
"Something (A) is relevant to a task (T) if it increases the likelihood of accomplishing the goal (G), which is implied by T."

A thing, a document or a piece of information may be relevant. Relevance does not depend on whether the subject is described as "things" or as "information".

== Epistemology ==
For example, if one believes that schizophrenia is caused by bad communication between mother and child, then family interaction studies become relevant. If, on the other hand, one subscribes to a genetic theory of relevance, then the study of genes becomes relevant. If one subscribes to the epistemology of empiricism, then only intersubjectively controlled observations are relevant. If, on the other hand, one subscribes to feminist epistemology, then the sex of the observer becomes relevant.

== Logic ==
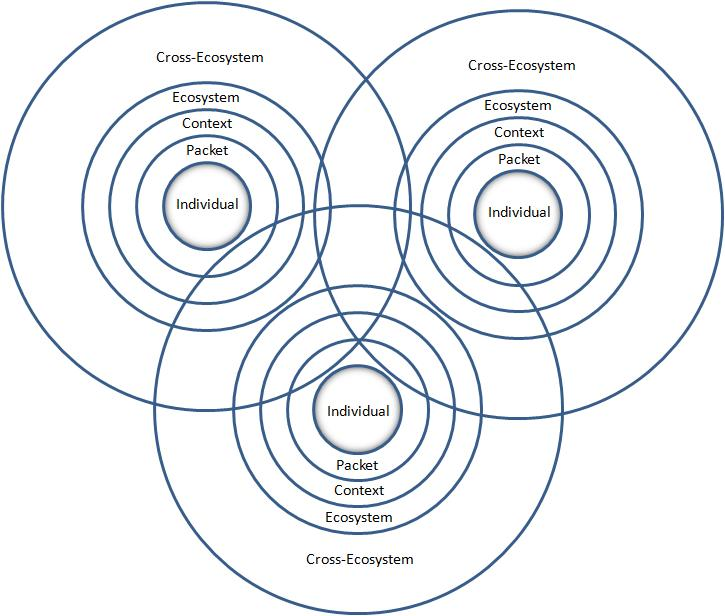
Graphic of relevance in digital ecosystems

In formal reasoning, relevance has proved an important but elusive concept. It is important because the solution of any problem requires the prior identification of the relevant elements from which a solution can be constructed. It is elusive because the meaning of relevance appears to be difficult or impossible to capture within conventional logical systems. The suggestion that q is relevant to p if q is implied by p breaks down because, under standard definitions of material implication, a false proposition implies all other propositions. However, although 'iron is a metal' may be implied by 'cats lay eggs', it does not seem to be relevant to it in the way in which 'cats are mammals' and 'mammals give birth to living young' are relevant to each other.

Another proposal defines relevance or, more accurately, irrelevance information-theoretically. It is easiest to state in terms of variables, which might reflect the values of measurable hypotheses or observation statements. The conditional entropy of an observation variable e conditioned on a variable h characterizing alternative hypotheses provides a measure of the irrelevance of the observation variable e to the set of competing hypotheses characterized by h. It is useful when combined with measures of the information content of the variable e in terms of its entropy. One can then subtract the content of e that is irrelevant to h (given by its conditional entropy conditioned on h) from the total information content of e (given by its entropy) to calculate the amount of information the variable e contains about the set of hypotheses characterized by h. Relevance (via the concept of irrelevance) and information content then characterize the observation variable and can be used to measure its sensitivity and specificity (respectively) as a test for alternative hypotheses.

More recently a number of theorists have sought to account for relevance in terms of "possible world logics" in intensional logic. Roughly, the idea is that necessary truths are true in all possible worlds, contradictions (logical falsehoods) are true in no possible worlds, and contingent propositions can be ordered in terms of the number of possible worlds in which they are true. Relevance is argued to depend upon the "remoteness relationship" between an actual world in which relevance is being evaluated and the set of possible worlds within which it is true.

== Application ==
=== Cognitive science and pragmatics ===
In 1986, Dan Sperber and Deirdre Wilson drew attention to the central importance of relevance decisions in reasoning and communication. They proposed an account of the process of inferring relevant information from any given utterance. To do this, they used what they called the "Principle of Relevance": namely, the position that any utterance addressed to someone automatically conveys the presumption of its own optimal relevance. The central idea of Sperber and Wilson's theory is that all utterances are encountered in some context, and the correct interpretation of a particular utterance is the one that allows most new implications to be made in that context on the basis of the least amount of information necessary to convey it. For Sperber and Wilson, relevance is conceived as relative or subjective, as it depends upon the state of knowledge of a hearer when they encounter an utterance.

Sperber and Wilson stress that this theory is not intended to account for every intuitive application of the English word "relevance". Relevance, as a technical term, is restricted to relationships between utterances and interpretations, and so the theory cannot account for intuitions such as the one that relevance relationships obtain in problems involving physical objects. If a plumber needs to fix a leaky faucet, for example, some objects and tools are relevant (e.g. a wrench) and others are not (e.g. a waffle iron). Moreover, the latter seems to be irrelevant in a manner which does not depend upon the plumber's knowledge or the utterances used to describe the problem.

A theory of relevance that seems to be more readily applicable to such instances of physical problem solving was suggested by Gorayska and Lindsay in a series of articles published during the 1990s. The key feature of their theory is the idea that relevance is goal-dependent. An item (e.g., an utterance or object) is relevant to a goal if and only if it can be an essential element of some plan capable of achieving the desired goal. This theory embraces both propositional reasoning and the problem-solving activities of people such as plumbers, and defines relevance in such a way that what is relevant is determined by the real world (because what plans will work is a matter of empirical fact) rather than the state of knowledge or belief of a particular problem solver.

=== Economics ===
The economist John Maynard Keynes saw the importance of defining relevance to the problem of calculating risk in economic decision-making. He suggested that the relevance of a piece of evidence, such as a true proposition, should be defined in terms of the changes it produces in estimations of the probability of future events. Specifically, Keynes proposed that new evidence e is irrelevant to a proposition x, given old evidence q, if and only if x/eq = x/q; otherwise, the proposition is relevant.

There are technical problems with this definition; for example, the relevance of a piece of evidence can be sensitive to the order in which other pieces of evidence are received.

=== Law ===
The meaning of "relevance" in U.S. law is reflected in Rule 401 of the Federal Rules of Evidence. That rule defines relevance as "having any tendency to make the existence of any fact that is of consequence to the determinations of the action more probable or less probable than it would be without the evidence". In other words, if a fact were to have no bearing on the truth or falsity of a conclusion, it would be legally irrelevant.

=== Library and information science ===
This field has considered when documents (or document representations) retrieved from databases are relevant or non-relevant. Given a conception of relevance, two measures have been applied: Precision and recall:

Recall = a : (a + c), where

a is the number of retrieved, relevant documents,
c is the number of non-retrieved, relevant documents (sometimes termed "silence").

Recall is thus an expression of how exhaustive a search for documents is.

Precision = a : (a + b), where

a is the number of retrieved, relevant documents,
b is the number of retrieved, non-relevant documents (often termed "noise").

Precision is thus a measure of the amount of noise in document-retrieval.

Relevance itself has in the literature often been based on what is termed "the system's view" and "the user's view". Hjørland (2010) criticize these two views and defends a "subject knowledge view of relevance".

=== Politics ===
During the 1960s, relevance became a buzzword, meaning roughly 'relevance to social concerns', such as racial equality, poverty, social justice, world hunger and world economic development. The implication was that some subjects, e.g., the study of medieval poetry and the practice of corporate law, were not worthwhile because they did not address pressing social issues.

== See also ==
- Description – Text for clarification; one of four rhetorical modes
- Distraction – Process of diverting the attention of an individual or group
- Information-action ratio – Information theory concept
- Information overload – Decision making with too much information
- Intention – Mental state denoting commitment to act
- Intuitionistic logic – Various systems of symbolic logic
- Kripke semantics – Formal semantics for non-classical logic systems
- Relevance theory – Theory of cognitive linguistics
- Salience (language) – Property of being noticeable or important
- Source criticism – Process of evaluating an information source
