= An Army of Davids =

2006 book by Glenn Reynolds

- First edition cover
- Author: Glenn Reynolds
- Language: English
- Subject: Technology and society
- Published: March 7, 2006 Thomas Nelson, Inc.
- Publication place: United States
- Media type: Print (Paperback and Hardcover)
- ISBN: 1-59555-054-2

An Army of Davids: How Markets and Technology Empower Ordinary People to Beat Big Media, Big Government, and Other Goliaths is a non-fiction book by Glenn Reynolds, a law professor at the University of Tennessee also known as the blogger 'Instapundit'. The book looks at modern American society through the lens of individuals versus social institutions, and Reynolds concludes that technological change has allowed more freedom of action for people in contrast to the 'big' establishment organizations that used to function as gatekeepers. Thus, he argues that the balance of power between individuals and institutions is "flatting out", which involves numerous decentralized networks rising up. Nelson Current, an arm of Thomas Nelson, Inc., published the book on March 7, 2006.

== Contents ==
Plot of CPU transistor counts against dates of introduction, illustrating Moore's Law. Note the logarithmic scale; the fitted line corresponds to exponential growth, with transistor count doubling every two years.

Reynolds divides the book into two distinct sections. The first focuses on trends currently taking place. The latter describes upcoming trends.

He begins by recalling the process of brewing his own beer earlier in his life. His grandfather had engaged in home-brewing as a bootlegger during Prohibition, and Reynolds began to do likewise because he considered ordinary commercial beer inoffensive and unsatisfying. He writes that "the point is that I was making something for myself, to suit me". He suggests that home-brewing resulted in increased competition, and commercial beer therefore improved. Reynolds then recounts making indie music in the mid-1990s; one of his albums held the number one spot on music website MP3.com for several weeks. When he started a small indie record company with his brother, he says, it "didn't make us rich, but ... [i]t made us happy".

Reynolds describes setting up his own blog as 'Instapundit' in the summer of 2001. He expresses his surprise at its growing popularity over the next several years, and points out that he receives more reader e-mail about the blog per day then the Rocky Mountain News does per week. Reynolds explains that "people were unhappy with the mass-market journalistic product and wanted to try making something of their own".

Reynolds sets up his thesis of "the triumph of personal technology over mass technology", as exemplified by those trends. Using the Biblical metaphor of David versus Goliath, he maintains that over the past three centuries social organizations—from governments to businesses and beyond—had to be 'Big' ("Goliath") to survive. Yet the past realities of economies of scale and economies of scope, Reynolds writes, have changed in the Information Age so that now small organizations and individuals ("David") can compete on a level playing field.

He argues that for most of human history, from about 10,000 BC to the Industrial Revolution, social organizations tended to be spontaneous and fickle, with no technology that a caveman "couldn't figure out in a few minutes". Big conceptual ideas such as the Pyramids, he writes, could only be realized with great cost and upheaval. He states that the Industrial Revolution created a paradigm of "big organizations doing big things", using innovations such as labor specialization, that lasted until the end of the 1900s.

Reynolds quotes William Gibson's famous remark, "The future has arrived, it's just not evenly distributed." He refers to Moore's Law about ever-increasing computing power, and he writes that the "minimum efficient scale of production" has changed. Thus, some people and small groups with access to new technology can produce at the same level as big groups and possibly achieve better results.

Reynolds titles a chapter 'Small Is the New Big'. He discusses the rise of "armchair workers" (through companies such as eBay), doing work at home—as well as specialty-based cottage industries such as Coffin's Shoes in Knoxville, TN. He argues that future trends will create a mosaic of co-existing big box retailers, local firms, and businesses run from home.

Reynolds writes, "where before journalists and pundits could bloviate at leisure, offering illogical analysis or citing 'facts' that were in fact false, now the Sunday morning op-eds have already been dissected on Saturday night, within hours of their appearing on newspapers' websites". He states that the internet has redistributed access to information from professional journalists acting as media gatekeepers to millions of ordinary people in the blogosphere and elsewhere. He remarks, "many unknowns can do it better than the lords of the profession". He gives some tips on successful blogging as well.

Reynolds writes two chapters speculating future technologies. The first, 'Empowering the Really Little Guys', is about nanotechnologies. He explains the potential of nanotechnology as, "practically anyone could live a life that would be extraordinary by today’s standards, in terms of health and material possessions". The second chapter of the two, 'Live Long—And Prosper!', is about extending human life-spans. It includes an extensive text interview with Aubrey De Grey, a biogerontologist at Cambridge University in England. Aubrey explains the cure for aging is achieving 'escape velocity' defined by him as "the point when we’re postponing aging for middle-aged people faster than time is passing". Reynolds debates the moral and ethical consequences of both technologies and eventually concludes their implementation would be beneficial to humanity.

He devotes a chapter to discussing what he views as a possible upcoming 'singularity'. He states that individuals will sometime soon "possess powers once thought available only to nation-states, super-heroes, or gods". He argues that human beings will gain new abilities through technology such as regenerative limbs and underwater breathing, and he views these as closely analogous to past types of body modification such as pacemakers and steroid treatments. Reynolds writes that people will become accustomed to such singularity-based changes in the same way drivers of fast moving cars become accustomed to their views of the road.

== Reviews ==
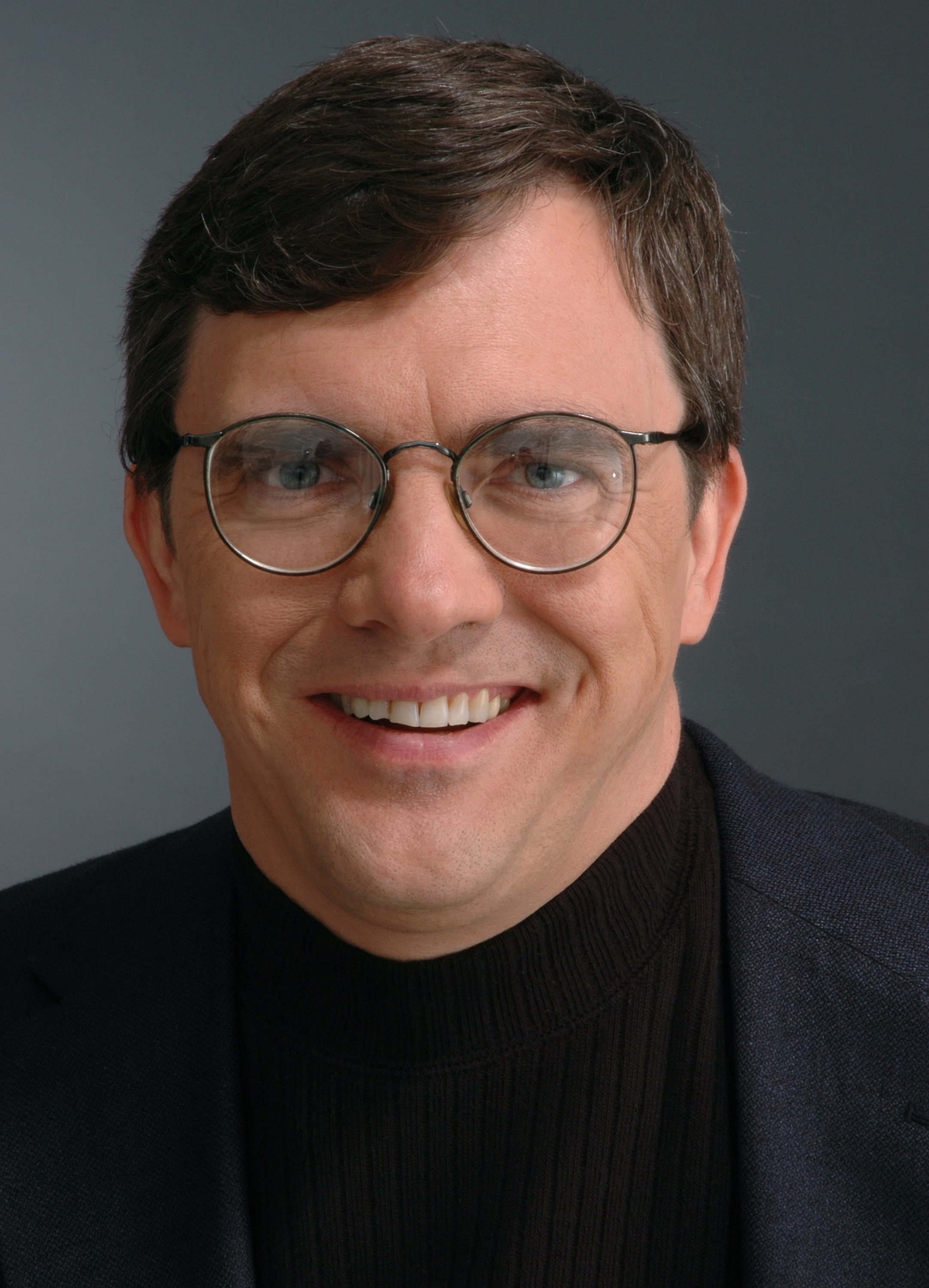
Author Glenn Reynolds

Journalist Michael Barone remarked, "This is a book of profound importance—and also a darn good read." He also commented, "Glenn Reynolds shows that technology can empower individuals to determine their own futures and to defeat those who would enslave us." Talk show host and author Hugh Hewitt labeled the book "a must-read ... that you gotta have if you are going to understand the culture-changing forces that are unleashed and at work across the globe".

Ray Kurzweil, an inventor, futurist, and author of books such as The Singularity is Near, wrote:

A student in her dorm room now commands the resources of a multi-million dollar music recording or movie editing studio of not so many years ago. The tools of creativity have been democratized and the tools of production are not far behind (Karl Marx take note). Glenn Reynolds's beguiling new book tells the insightful story of how an 'army of Davids' is inheriting the Earth, leaving a trail of obsolete business models not to mention cultural, economic, and political institutions in its wake.

Journalist Michael S. Malone praised the book, stating that "I cannot think of a better book for the average reader to understand just how the Web and other digital technologies are reversing the polarities of modern society ... all of the diverse trends in a single narrative." John Podhoretz, in a New York Post review, wrote that "I can guarantee you there won't be a more exciting or inspiring book published this year".

Joshua Sharf of Blogcritics referred to it as "a book that shows what can happen when smart people spend time thinking about social trends". Arianna Huffington wrote in the Huffington Post recommending the book. She labeled it "a powerful paean to how changes in technology are empowering the little guy". Joe Trippi, author of The Revolution Will Not Be Televised, called the book "a masterpiece" and also stated that it is "[p]acked with fresh ideas and adorned with graceful prose".

Virginia Postrel, a columnist and author of books such as The Future and its Enemies, called it a "smart, fun tour of a major social and economic trend." Mickey Kaus called Reynolds "fearless", and stated that the book features "one big idea after another, like a Hollywood thriller that piles on the plot rather than stopping to tie up the loose ends".

== See also ==
- The Cult of the Amateur
- Technopoly: the Surrender of Culture to Technology
- The Wisdom of Crowds
- Remix (book)
- Sociology of scientific knowledge
- Sociology of the Internet
- Technology and society
