= B-television =

Critical television term

In television studies, B-television or B-TV is the term used as an analogy to "B-movie" to describe such traits of commercial television as shallowness, lack of originality, sensationalism, preponderance of escapist entertainment to serious news, personalization and dramatization.

== Overview ==
The German media scholar Heidemarie Schumacher used the term in 1985 in her article From the True, the Good, the Beautiful to the Truly Beautiful Goods—audience identification strategies on German "B-Television" programs to characterize the development of German commercial television, which adopted "the aesthetics of commercials" with its "inane positiveness radiated by every participant, the inclusion of clips, soft focus, catchy music" as well as "promotion of merchandise through product placement". Schumacher notes that after 1984 deregulation German public television passed its climax and became marginalized. Newly established commercial stations, operating without the burden of societal legitimacy, focused solely on profitability. To establish and maintain viewer loyalty these stations would broadcast reality shows, sensational journalism, daily soap operas, infotainment programs, talk shows, game shows and soft pornography. "Product placement series that unabashedly display" branded products "are the overt expression of a kind of television refunctionalized as a supermarket", laments Schumacher.

In her article Schumacher mentions Amusing Ourselves to Death by an American cultural critic Neil Postman, who formulated the thesis of television programming as a derivative of advertising, creating "a species of information that might properly be called disinformation—misplaced, irrelevant, fragmented or superficial information that creates the illusion of knowing something but which in fact leads one away from knowing".

Like Postman, Schumacher notes that contemporary television advertisement often chooses to reinforce brand loyalty rather than promoting product. This reverse marketing approach is used by television broadcasters to advertise the stations themselves. Schumacher lists three specific principles: grabbing the viewers' attention, establishing emotional involvement with the audience, and maintaining the viewers' interest as the cornerstones to acquiring and maintaining market share. A commercial RTL station described such a building of viewers' loyalty in positive terms: "RTL has discovered something entirely new for television. The viewer".

== Daily routine ==
Schumacher argues that viewer loyalty is established primarily through the representation of familiar emotional situations and the everyday problems of the viewers, which means that private stations broadcast predominantly private affairs. Further development of this approach led to creation of reality TV shows, which generate new realities by intervening directly in the actual life of its participants. Such personalisation and dramatization of television precipitated the "Fall of Public Man", in words of Richard Sennett.

The strategy of creating viewer loyalty through emotional sensations is reflected in scandalous "special news" that "favor sex and crime topics and employ highly affective commentary style, a clip aesthetic as well as a musical accompaniment borrowed from the crime film genre". As an example, Schumacher mentions Real Personal, a talk show about human sexuality that was televised by NBC five times a week during 1990s. "The title itself encapsulates the message of 'B-TV': real people and their 'real' problems are the focus here", contemplates Schumacher.

Mentioning the highly successful entertainment programs of David Letterman and Jay Leno, Schumacher proclaims that a talk show host, seen daily on the television screen, becomes almost a part of the family. "Spreading not only inanity, but also a sense of security", the host "provides a fixed portion of our daily routine" along with a daily soap opera, daily infotainment show or a daily game show.

"Appeals to viewer emotions and the active participation of the consumer enhance the ability of 'B-TV' to exploit the market", concludes Schumacher.

== Proxy for conversation ==
The concept of personalization and dramatization was not lost on the creators of BuzzFeed a quarter century later, when they got interested in why some internet videos become viral. "It turned out that the valuable things did not spread, and the things that did spread were used by people as a proxy of conversation, as an extension of themselves", says Ze Frank, president of BuzzFeed Motion Pictures.

"We looked at the things people share, and we came up with three categories that were interesting to us: first, people expressing a part of their identity. The second is emotional gifting. The third is social information 'Hey, we were talking about this the other day'. The information is already known, it is not new, all it does it helps resurfacing a known entity inside of a social connection. ... How do you use it? If identity can be expressed with content, what kinds of identities you can come up with? ... And then you make a crapload of content ... Our studio makes almost a 100 pieces of short form videos a week. ... [In broadcast television] you have to capture as large audience as possible and program for this audience, because the number of attention slots is finite. This means that 'niche' becomes a pejorative, and many people are left out of media conversation and have no chance to say: 'oh, my god, this is totally me'. The new era [of Internet video] allows us to multiply across these different experiences". This approach worked and brought BuzzFeed millions of views and shares.

Going forward, BuzzFeed realized that a shareable video carrying branded message can reach a wide audience for a fraction of advertising budget used for traditional advertising campaign. "We are applying the same general strategy: what are the values the brand is trying to communicate, and how they fit with the nearest social values that we know are fundamental to the consumer. ... We had a campaign for new lightweight kitty litter. The national campaign shown on broadcast television had people throwing litter into each other. It was beautifully shot, but it did not align with a single social value I can think of. Throwing litter into each other has a zero chance of being used to connect to another human being. So we took a step back and made a video which is more about relationship with cats, and we used the same kind of general idea of voice-over, and the video did really well".

While Schumacher and Postman regret the prevalence of "advertisement television" with low informational and social value on commercial TV stations, BuzzFeed intentionally produce personalized videos with capacity for sharing. Unlike traditional television, where viewers consume the content passively, users of internet video platforms share the videos they identify with, multiplying the effect of an advertising campaign.

== Cheap escapism ==
Erik Henriksen from Portland Mercury used the term "B-TV" when he reviewed Stargate Atlantis television series to describe the kind of show that is not "genuinely great", but one that "just works—albeit in a vaguely embarrassing and silly way—at entertaining the audience, at stringing along the same characters from week to week, at churning out boilerplate plots that are nonetheless peppered with just enough originality and uniqueness to make them enjoyable and fun and distracting."
