= Alan Shapiro (education reformer) =

Alan Shapiro (January 15, 1926 – January 28, 2011) was an American educator and educational reformer who became a leading contributor to Teachable Moment, a New York City-based teacher education project of the Morningside Center for Teaching Social Responsibility which is an important proponent of effective, universal education. A graduate of Adelphi University and Columbia University Teachers College he also attended the University of Illinois before serving as a combat infantryman in the American Army in World War II. Shapiro taught for many years in the public school system of New Rochelle, New York.

It was as an English teacher at Isaac E. Young Junior High School (now Isaac E. Young Middle School) in the New Rochelle public schools that Shapiro, a founder and leader of the local unit of the American Federation of Teachers, began a collaboration with NYU education professor Neil Postman and Charles Weingartner to develop a model "school without walls" high school. This "Program for Inquiry, Involvement, and Independent Study " ("3Is") began operation within New Rochelle High School in 1970. The school eliminated grades, required courses, and required times of attendance and offered credit through seminars, community projects, and independent study efforts. (see Inquiry Education)

After retiring as a high school teacher Shapiro became an adjunct instructor at the College of New Rochelle and Vassar College. He also was a founder of Educators for Social Responsibility - Metropolitan Area ("ESR-Metro"), which became The Morningside Center for Teaching Social Responsibility. There, much of the focus of Shapiro's work became the development of critical thinking in students and the introduction of complex subjects into schools, ideas which he developed through a decade's worth of writings at the Teachable Moment website. He and his wife Sue moved from New Rochelle, NY after his retirement and resided in Connecticut.

== Selected publications ==
Alan Shapiro (May 1960). "Social Class Theory: The Lower-Class Child in the Middle-Class School". The Clearing House. 34 (9). Taylor & Francis, Ltd. JSTOR 30195717: 521–525. doi:10.1080/00098655.1960.11475780.
