= Virginia Postrel =

American journalist and author (born 1960)

- Postrel (2019)
- Born: Virginia Inman; 1960 (age 65–66); Asheville, North Carolina, U.S.
- Education: Princeton University (BA)
- Occupations: Journalist, author, columnist
- Known for: The Future and Its Enemies; Reason editor
- Spouse: Steven Postrel
- Website: https://vpostrel.com/

Virginia Inman Postrel (/ˈpɑːˈstrɛl/ PAH-STREL; born 1960) is an American journalist and author who writes on commerce, culture, and technology. She is a contributing editor at Works in Progress and co-host of the podcast Everyday Abundance.

From 1989 to 2000, Postrel was editor-in-chief of Reason, the American libertarian monthly. She took the magazine online and doubled its print circulation. She later wrote columns for The New York Times, The Atlantic, The Wall Street Journal, and Bloomberg View. Postrel shared the Bastiat Prize in 2011 for her columns. She describes herself as writing from a "classical liberal" perspective.

Postrel was among the first American political commentators to start a blog, and she is the author of four books. Her first, The Future and Its Enemies (1998), posited a conflict between "dynamists" and "stasists" that cuts across the left–right divide. It found an early following in Silicon Valley and has been described as an antecedent of the abundance movement in 2020s American policy debate. The Substance of Style (2003) argued that aesthetic value had become part of mass commerce, and The Power of Glamour (2013) treated glamour as a form of "nonverbal rhetoric". The Fabric of Civilization (2020) is a global history of textiles and their role in technology and trade.

== Early life and education ==
Virginia Inman was born in Asheville, North Carolina, and raised from the age of four in Greenville, South Carolina. Greenville's principal industry was textiles, and her father was an engineer of polyester films . Her mother, a full-time homemaker during most of her childhood, returned to school for a master's degree in English while Virginia was in high school and later taught college English. Her paternal grandfather was a Presbyterian minister, and she has described a family life that revolved around a theologically liberal church in a town where "a lot of people think Billy Graham is a dangerous liberal". She attended racially integrated public schools. Postrel has described Greenville as an "information-scarce environment" and has credited her father's gift subscription to The Wall Street Journal with shaping her early interest in politics and economics. In high school she worked on Charles Ravenel's 1978 campaign against Strom Thurmond.

At Princeton University, she abandoned plans to major in history after a disappointing first course and majored instead in English literature, specializing in Renaissance drama. She also took economics courses and studied moral philosophy under Thomas Nagel. While in college she formed the ambition to edit Reason, a magazine she had discovered in the university's library. She graduated in 1982 with a Bachelor of Arts.

== Career ==
Postrel interned at The Wall Street Journal in the summer after her junior year and joined the paper's Philadelphia bureau after graduating. After two years there she moved to Boston to report for Inc., and in 1986 she moved to Los Angeles and joined the staff of Reason.

=== Reason editorship ===
Reason print cover (May 1996), featuring Postrel's byline

Postrel became Reason's editor in July 1989, at age 29. She has said that, unlike her predecessors, she regarded Reason as "a mainstream magazine" with "a minority point of view", and that she sought to root it in a classical liberal tradition reaching back through Adam Smith and David Hume alongside mid-century libertarian thought. Vanity Fair described her monthly column as the magazine's "principal attraction for many readers". From 1995 to 2000 she also wrote a column for Forbes and its technology supplement Forbes ASAP.

Reviewing her first decade in 1999, the Columbia Journalism Review wrote that the magazine had "elbowed its way" into national debates such as the privatization of Social Security, gained "cachet with the Silicon Valley crowd", and opened its pages to "giddy defenses of popular culture and consumerism". During her tenure the magazine launched its website, Reason.com, and print circulation roughly doubled, from about 28,000 in 1989 to 55,000 in 1999. Reason was a National Magazine Award finalist three times under her editorship. (Note: The first nomination, in 1993, came for Edith Efron's essay on the Clarence Thomas hearings. In 1996 and 1998 the magazine was a finalist in the public interest category, the latter for Jacob Sullum's cover story on the undertreatment of pain.)

Postrel's first book, The Future and Its Enemies, emerged from her editorial work. For Reason's April 1990 Earth Day anniversary issue she wrote "The Green Road to Serfdom", which concluded that the environmental movement's unifying ideal was unchanging equilibrium. (Note: Other articles developed the book's themes further. A Washington Post essay the same month observed a tension between "the proponents of economic dynamism" and "the advocates of stasis" that did not follow party lines, and predicted that trade and immigration would become dividing issues. A November 1992 Reason editorial, "Dynamic Tension", set out the framework in full, dividing "dynamic and static visions of the good society" and pairing Pat Buchanan with Al Gore as advocates of stasis.) She began the book in 1995 and published it in 1998, while still editing the magazine, and lectured widely on its themes, including the American Enterprise Institute's Bradley Lecture in January 1999 and an address to the Mont Pelerin Society that August.

Postrel joined the board of advisors of the Foundation for Individual Rights in Education (FIRE) within a year of the organization's founding in 1999, and by 2004 had joined its board of directors.

=== Blogging and the Times column (2000–2007) ===
Postrel stepped down as Reason's editor in January 2000, remaining on the masthead as editor-at-large through 2001. She moved to Dallas in 2000, where her husband had joined the faculty of Southern Methodist University. That December she began a blog, The Scene, at dynamist.com, a site she had set up to promote The Future and Its Enemies. Existing blogs were largely devoted to technology, and hers was among the first by political journalists, appearing in the same months as Andrew Sullivan's Daily Dish and Josh Marshall's Talking Points Memo. Postrel maintained the site's codebase herself. According to Marc Fisher, Postrel's Reason column had reached mainly readers who already shared her views, whereas the blog also drew readers from "another ideological planet". By 2005 she had cut back, saying blogging had "started to crowd out my other work".

From 2000 to 2006 Postrel was one of four writers who rotated the Thursday "Economic Scene" column in the business section of The New York Times, with Alan Krueger, Jeff Madrick, and Hal Varian. The column reported on economic research for general readers and returned to themes of her first two books, including immigrant entrepreneurship, the economics of variety and aesthetics, and the history of technologies such as the shipping container, the subject of her final column in March 2006. In Dallas she also wrote a column for D Magazine and published her second book, The Substance of Style (2003). The Postrels returned to Los Angeles in 2007.

=== Magazine columns and glamour (2006–2022) ===
Postrel's interest in glamour, which had grown out of The Substance of Style, led to an essay for the San Francisco Museum of Modern Art's 2004 exhibition catalogue, a talk at the 2004 TED conference, and a 2006 Liberty Fund conference on luxury that she organized. She signed a contract for the book in 2007, but treatment for cancer delayed the start of serious research. In 2008 she organized a group blog, Deep Glamour, that served as a workshop for her third book, The Power of Glamour (2013). Simon & Schuster published it in November 2013.

In 2006 Postrel became a contributing editor of The Atlantic, where she wrote the "Commerce and Culture" column until 2009. Her December 2006 essay "In Praise of Chain Stores" drew wide notice. In 2011 Postrel began a "Commerce and Culture" column in The Wall Street Journal. In May of that year she joined Bloomberg View, the new opinion section of Bloomberg News, as one of its founding columnists. She wrote for Bloomberg until 2022 on subjects ranging from federal regulation of consumer products to the textile industry. In 2011, she shared the Bastiat Prize for a portfolio of her Bloomberg columns.

Her essays were twice selected for The Best American Science and Nature Writing: in 2004 Steven Pinker chose "The Design of Your Life" from Men's Journal, and in 2009 Elizabeth Kolbert chose "Pop Psychology" from The Atlantic.

=== Recent work ===
In fall 2018 Postrel took a year's leave from her Bloomberg column to write her fourth book, The Fabric of Civilization (2020). Research for the book was supported by a grant from the Alfred P. Sloan Foundation's program for the public understanding of science, technology, and economics, and she was a guest scholar at the Centre for Textile Research at the University of Copenhagen. From 2020 to 2022 she was a visiting fellow at the Smith Institute for Political Economy and Philosophy at Chapman University, teaching courses that combined the humanities and economics.

As of 2026, Postrel is a contributing editor at Works in Progress, where she began a history column in the magazine's first print edition in January 2026, publishes a newsletter on Substack, and co-hosts Everyday Abundance, a podcast produced by the Abundance Institute, with the writer Charles C. Mann.

== Books ==
=== The Future and Its Enemies (1998) ===
First edition (1998)

The Future and Its Enemies argues that the left–right axis of the Cold War era is giving way to a conflict between "dynamism", which accepts spontaneous order and incremental trial and error as the mechanisms of progress, and "stasis", which seeks either to prevent change or to direct it toward a predetermined outcome. Postrel divides stasists into reactionaries, whose value is stability, and technocrats, whose value is control, and finds both across party lines, grouping Pat Buchanan, Ross Perot, Ralph Nader, and Al Gore as advocates of managed change. Drawing on Friedrich Hayek, Aaron Wildavsky, and Jane Jacobs, among others, the book applies the dynamist–stasis framework to cases from medicine, fashion, environmental policy, and popular culture.

The book found a ready audience in the technology industry. In a New York Times column, John Tierney described dynamism as "the evolutionary approach, guided by lots of independent 'feedback loops,' that's popular in Silicon Valley and on the Internet", and used it to explain New York's resistance to new building. A year after publication, Vanity Fair reported that it had "acquired demi-cult status in the high-tech world", naming Jeff Bezos and Bob Metcalfe among its admirers.

Some academic critics were more skeptical: the sociologist Alan Wolfe found the book "lively, engaging, and thought-provoking" but argued that its examples from nature and technology were metaphors that did not add up to a political program, and the political scientist James W. Ceaser maintained that dynamism treated liberty as a means to progress, departing from a libertarian tradition that treated liberty as an end.

External videos
- Debate on The Future and Its Enemies between Postrel and David Frum, November 16, 1998, C-SPAN
- Booknotes interview on The Future and Its Enemies February 14, 1999, C-SPAN

The book held influence in business and technology circles and returned to policy debates in the 2020s. Brian Doherty's history of the libertarian movement names Postrel, alongside Ludwig von Mises and Hayek, as an inspiration for John Mackey, the founder of Whole Foods, who sought to present free markets as a progressive cause. Marc Andreessen listed Postrel among the "patron saints" of his 2023 "Techno-Optimist Manifesto".

The book has been described as an antecedent of the abundance movement. Matthew Yglesias called it "extremely prescient on societal effects of rapid technological change" and credited Postrel with identifying the dynamism–stasis conflict in 1998, "when the general vibes of politics were extremely different". Reviewing Ezra Klein and Derek Thompson's Abundance for Reason in 2025, Postrel welcomed its case against procedural obstacles to building, but noted that Klein had placed himself among the technocrats of her framework and faulted the book for bypassing price signals and market feedback. Reflecting on her own book in 2022, she said she would give more weight to the capacity of rapid change to disrupt communities.

=== The Substance of Style (2003) ===
First edition (2003)

The Substance of Style: How the Rise of Aesthetic Value Is Remaking Commerce, Culture, and Consciousness argues that the "look and feel" of things has become a pervasive source of economic value, and that the spread of design through mass-market retail represents a democratization of taste. The preface opens with the return of beauty salons, nail polish, and colored burkas to Afghanistan after the fall of the Taliban. Postrel attributes rising attention to design at chains such as Target and Starbucks to consumer demand and to cheaper, more flexible production rather than to advertising or to designers educating public taste. The purest case, she writes, is the toilet brush: an object hidden in a corner of the bathroom, yet sold in dozens of designs and prices, which shows that the desire for a pleasing object cannot be reduced to impressing the neighbors. Later chapters consider aesthetic choices as a form of identity, define authenticity as a match between form and desire instead of a matter of provenance, and examine disputes over the boundaries of design. HarperCollins published the book in September 2003.

External videos
- Presentation on The Substance of Style, September 23, 2003, C-SPAN Book TV

Reviewers largely accepted the book's claim that aesthetics are a real source of economic value. Publishers Weekly predicted it "may someday become a classic of the genre". George Will endorsed her argument that economic statistics undercount aesthetic value and contrasted her "cheerful analysis" with longstanding disapproval of consumerism. In Technology and Culture, the business historian Regina Lee Blaszczyk noted that the book's focus on the mass market set it apart from the scholarship on the Arts and Crafts movement from which Postrel had borrowed her title. In The Atlantic, Tom Carson called the book "brightly argued, maddeningly blinkered": he contended that it explained how "mass aestheticism" had pervaded contemporary life, but its argument extended only to consumers with disposable income. The dress historian Anne Hollander, in The New Republic, claimed that the book made the case for "worship of diversity" without judgment, and that fine art and good design had historically supplied models for popular taste rather than opposing it. The New York Times chose it as a notable book of the year for 2003, and Strategy+Business included it among the best business books of 2004.

=== The Power of Glamour (2013) ===
Postrel: Central planning gained appeal via glamour, as in this 1930 Brunswick Radio ad

The Power of Glamour: Longing and the Art of Visual Persuasion characterizes glamour as a form of "nonverbal rhetoric" that produces a sense of longing in its audience, a feeling Postrel summarizes as if only. She identifies three elements that all glamour shares: the promise of escape and transformation, the concealment of effort, cost, and flaws, and mystery that leaves room for the audience's imagination. Because glamour depends on the relationship between an object and the perceiver's desire, she argues, it cannot be purchased and is not the same as luxury, nor does it depend on the "personal magnetism" of charisma or sex appeal, since glamour is usually remote and impersonal.

The book is organized in three parts, on the nature, elements, and evolution of glamour, with its eight chapters interleaved by short essays on icons such as the aviator, the princess, the superhero, the wind turbine, and Shanghai. It is illustrated with more than a hundred images.

Kirkus Reviews called the book "thoroughly researched" and "wholly entertaining", and several reviewers found that the illustrations advanced the argument. In The New York Times Book Review, Leslie Camhi praised its "cleareyed and exhaustive analysis". In The Wall Street Journal, the novelist and critic D. J. Taylor accepted its distinctions between glamour, sex appeal, and charisma but objected that Postrel relied excessively on earlier commentators' judgments. The economist Tyler Cowen called it Postrel's "best and most compelling book".

=== The Fabric of Civilization (2020) ===
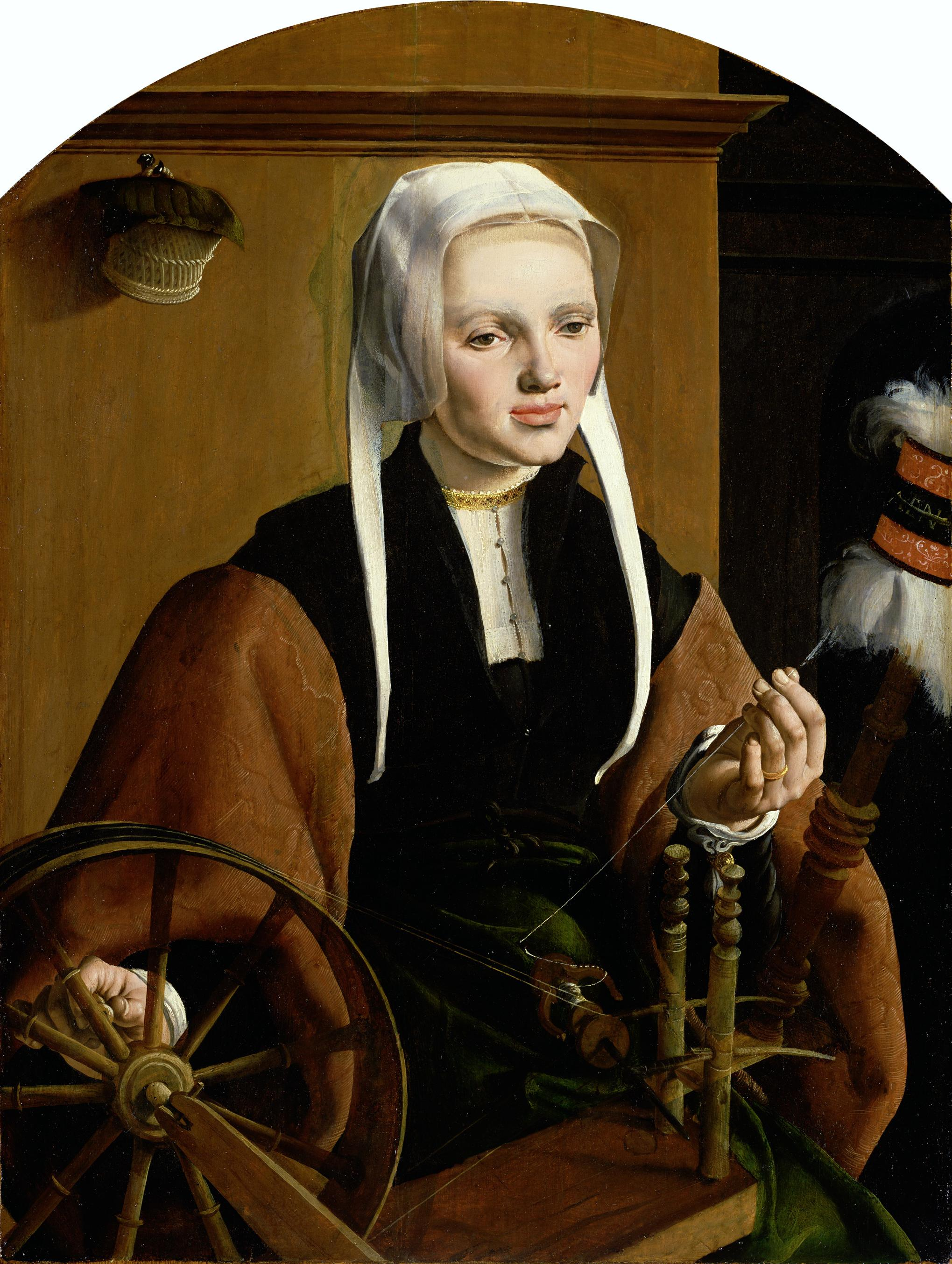
Postrel: Spinning in van Heemskerck's Renaissance portraits depicts women's enterprise, not wives' dependence

The Fabric of Civilization: How Textiles Made the World is a global history of textiles from prehistory to the near future. Postrel's starting point is that cloth is a technology so familiar it has become invisible. Reversing Arthur C. Clarke's adage, she writes that "any sufficiently familiar technology is indistinguishable from nature", and that "we suffer textile amnesia because we enjoy textile abundance".

The book follows cloth through seven stages, from production to exchange. Each chapter pairs a chronological narrative with an argument, a structure Postrel likens to warp and weft. Fiber reveals the artifice behind supposedly natural materials; thread explains why the formidable labor of spinning, largely by women, made spinning machines the first engines of the Industrial Revolution; cloth shows the kinship of weaving and mathematics, from pattern notation to the Jacquard loom; dye shows dyers' knowledge of chemistry before the formalization of its science; traders introduces the "social technologies", from credit to double-entry bookkeeping, that made long-distance exchange possible; consumers examines how the desire for textiles has disrupted societies, through sumptuary law, calico bans, and the slave trade; and innovators considers the draw of textiles to scientists, discussing work in synthetic fibers and silk grown in yeast.

Reviewing the book alongside Clare Hunter's Threads of Life in The Wall Street Journal, the historian Judith Flanders found Postrel's the more expansive and technical of the two and specific claims persuasive, such as the influence of the textile trade on double-entry bookkeeping. In The New York Times Book Review, Dana Thomas praised the book's capacity to convey broad technological change through capsule history, singling out the chapter on dye and the attention to individual figures such as the silk designer Philippe de Lasalle. The Asian Review of Books praised the measures of spinning labor Postrel assembled, such as the days required to spin the thread for a Roman toga or a pair of blue jeans, and her attention to the anonymous women whose experiments with plants and minerals produced breakthroughs in dyeing. Several reviewers found the passages on the mechanics of cloth construction hard to follow in prose. The legal scholar Stephen L. Carter, a fellow Bloomberg Opinion columnist, named it his best nonfiction book of 2020.

== Views ==
=== Libertarianism ===
Postrel considered herself a libertarian when she became editor of Reason in 1989, and has since come to prefer the term "classical liberal". As editor she wanted the magazine rooted in a classical liberal tradition reaching back to the Scottish Enlightenment. In a 2007 essay for Cato Unbound she divided the movement into a deductive tradition descending from Ayn Rand and Murray Rothbard, which reasons from first principles toward a minimal role for government, and an empiricist tradition running from Adam Smith and David Hume to Friedrich Hayek, Ronald Coase, and Milton Friedman, which she credited with most of the movement's practical achievements. The deductive tradition, she argued, cannot work toward a better future because "better" implies accepting incremental change. She has described herself as an incrementalist, and has disputed that a free society can be designed from a clean slate when "we're all embedded in history".

Postrel distinguishes her views from a "doctrinaire" form of American libertarianism that she says is "defined primarily by its opposition to the state". As Reason editor she criticized the Libertarian Party's "fantasies of revolution", and the rhetoric of "government doesn't work", which she said abandoned the classical liberal case for constrained government "in favor of a vague anarchism". By 2022 she regarded the word "libertarian" as lost to that strain. Postrel has stated that dynamism, the central idea of her first book, "isn't synonymous with libertarianism" and instead defines it as "a variety of liberalism that foregrounds learning".

=== Organ donation ===
In March 2006, Postrel donated a kidney to Sally Satel, a psychiatrist and fellow writer she had known since 1997. Satel, diagnosed with kidney failure in 2004, had been reluctant to ask friends or family and would have preferred to pay a donor. Since payment was illegal, she had listed herself on MatchingDonors.com in hopes of finding a stranger. Satel has described Postrel as a "fond acquaintance" who offered a kidney in an unsolicited email. Satel went on to become a prominent advocate of compensating living donors and edited the collection When Altruism Isn't Enough (2009).

Postrel has likewise argued for compensating living organ donors, contending that legal prohibitions on payment create a shortage of transplantable kidneys. She has also written about mechanisms that operate within the gift restrictions, such as donor chains. When National Kidney Foundation chairman Charles Fruit objected that "payment is an affront to those who have already donated", Postrel, whose own donation had been uncompensated, replied that unpaid donors do not give organs in order to feel morally superior and should not object to others being compensated.

=== Housing supply ===
Postrel has argued against restrictions on housing supply since early in her career. In a 1987 Wall Street Journal op-ed, she wrote that single-family zoning, off-street parking requirements, and dimensional standards in building codes made otherwise viable conversions illegal or uneconomic, and that loosening those rules would add low-cost units more cheaply than subsidized construction. Her 1990 Washington Post essay on the "politics of stasis" named local growth controls, then spreading through California ballot measures, as one of its principal expressions. She has since described housing as the issue on which she is most hopeful for the dynamist case, citing California legislation associated with the state senator Scott Wiener, a San Francisco progressive, as evidence that it can win support across party lines.

=== Copyright and fair use ===
Postrel has criticized the expansion of United States copyright law, arguing that repeated extensions of copyright terms reward incumbent rights holders instead of serving the constitutional purpose of encouraging new work. In a 2022 interview she named intellectual property, and copyright in particular, as an issue that had become far more salient since The Future and Its Enemies, describing the problem as balancing rewards to creators against the freedom to recombine existing work.

In 2014, she sided with the newly founded Authors Alliance against the Authors Guild, which had characterized the new group as hostile to copyright. Writing as a commercial author of the kind the Guild claimed to represent, Postrel argued that the dispute was not over whether copyright should exist but over the limits of fair use, and that the Guild's litigation against Google Books and HathiTrust worked against authors' interests, since scanning and indexing make older books findable. The difficulty of earning a living as a writer, she wrote, stems from the abundance of cheap reading material rather than from infringement.

== Personal life ==
Postrel is married to Steven Postrel, an economist and professor of business strategy, whom she met when both were freshmen at Princeton. The couple moved to Los Angeles in 1986 when he began an appointment at UCLA. Raised Presbyterian, Postrel converted to Judaism in her twenties.

In 2007, Postrel was treated for HER2-positive breast cancer with chemotherapy and the biological drug Herceptin; she was declared cancer-free in 2008. She later questioned whether the research investment behind such treatments would survive proposals to centralize health care finance in the United States.

== Awards and honors ==
- Gerald Loeb Award finalist, Commentary category, 1993 and 1994
- Essays selected for The Best American Science and Nature Writing, 2004 and 2009
- Bastiat Prize, 2011, shared with Tom Easton of The Economist
- First place, online entertainment commentary, Los Angeles Press Club Southern California Journalism Awards, 2012, for her Bloomberg columns

== Publications ==
=== Books ===
- Postrel, Virginia (1998). The Future and Its Enemies: The Growing Conflict Over Creativity, Enterprise, and Progress. Free Press. ISBN 0-684-82760-3.
- — (2003). The Substance of Style: How the Rise of Aesthetic Value Is Remaking Commerce, Culture, and Consciousness. HarperCollins. ISBN 0-06-018632-1.
- — (2013). The Power of Glamour: Longing and the Art of Visual Persuasion. Simon & Schuster. ISBN 978-1-4165-6111-8.
- — (2020). The Fabric of Civilization: How Textiles Made the World. Basic Books. ISBN 978-1-5416-1760-5.

=== Selected essays and columns ===
- Postrel, Virginia (March 13, 1987). "Tapping the Shadow Housing Market". The Wall Street Journal – via vpostrel.com.
- — (April 1990). "The Green Road to Serfdom". Reason.
- — (April 1, 1990). "The Ideology Shuffle". Outlook. The Washington Post. Archived from the original on August 27, 2017.
- — (November 1992). "Dynamic Tension". Reason.
- — (October 1996). "The Choice". Reason.
- — (August 25, 1997). "Resilience vs. Anticipation". Forbes ASAP. Archived from the original on September 13, 2006.
- — (December 1997). "The Croly Ghost". Reason.
- — (October 2003). "The Design of Your Life". Men's Journal – via vpostrel.com.
- — (December 2006). "In Praise of Chain Stores". The Atlantic. Archived from the original on February 5, 2016.
- — (October 24, 2006). "The Surgery Was Simple; The Process Is Another Story". USA Today. Archived from the original on December 9, 2006.
- — (March 18, 2007). "An 18th-Century Brain in a 21st-Century Head". Cato Unbound.
- — (December 2008). "Pop Psychology". The Atlantic. Archived from the original on January 29, 2017.
- — (March 2009). "My Drug Problem". The Atlantic. Archived from the original on February 6, 2012.
- — (July 2009). "With Functioning Kidneys for All". The Atlantic. Archived from the original on January 12, 2012.
- — (April 9, 2011). "The Fantasy of Survivalism". The Wall Street Journal. Archived from the original on May 31, 2016.
- — (June 8, 2011). "Need a Light Bulb? Uncle Sam Gets to Choose". Bloomberg View. Archived from the original on March 2, 2020.
- — (November 29, 2012). "A Free-Market Fix for the Copyright Racket". Bloomberg View. Archived from the original on October 6, 2020.
- — (June 1, 2014). "The War Between 'Authors' and Writers". Bloomberg View. Archived from the original on March 7, 2016.
- — (June 2025). "Abundance Makes the Case for 'Supply-Side Progressivism'". Reason.

=== Selected speeches ===
- Postrel, Virginia (November 11, 1994). The Age of the Editor (Speech). "The State and Fate of Publishing: A Flair Symposium", Harry Ransom Humanities Research Center. University of Texas at Austin.
- — (January 11, 1999). In Praise of Play (Speech). Bradley Lecture, American Enterprise Institute. Washington, D.C. Archived from the original on February 20, 2026.
- — (August 1999). After Socialism (Speech). Mont Pelerin Society meeting – via Reason, November 1999.
- — (October 23, 1999). Dynamism, Stasis, and Popular Culture (Speech). Pop!Tech (Camden Technology Conference). Camden, Maine. Archived from the original on January 23, 2000.
- — (February 2004). On Glamour (Speech). TED2004. Monterey, California.
