= Sharon Har =

American politician

Sharon E. Har
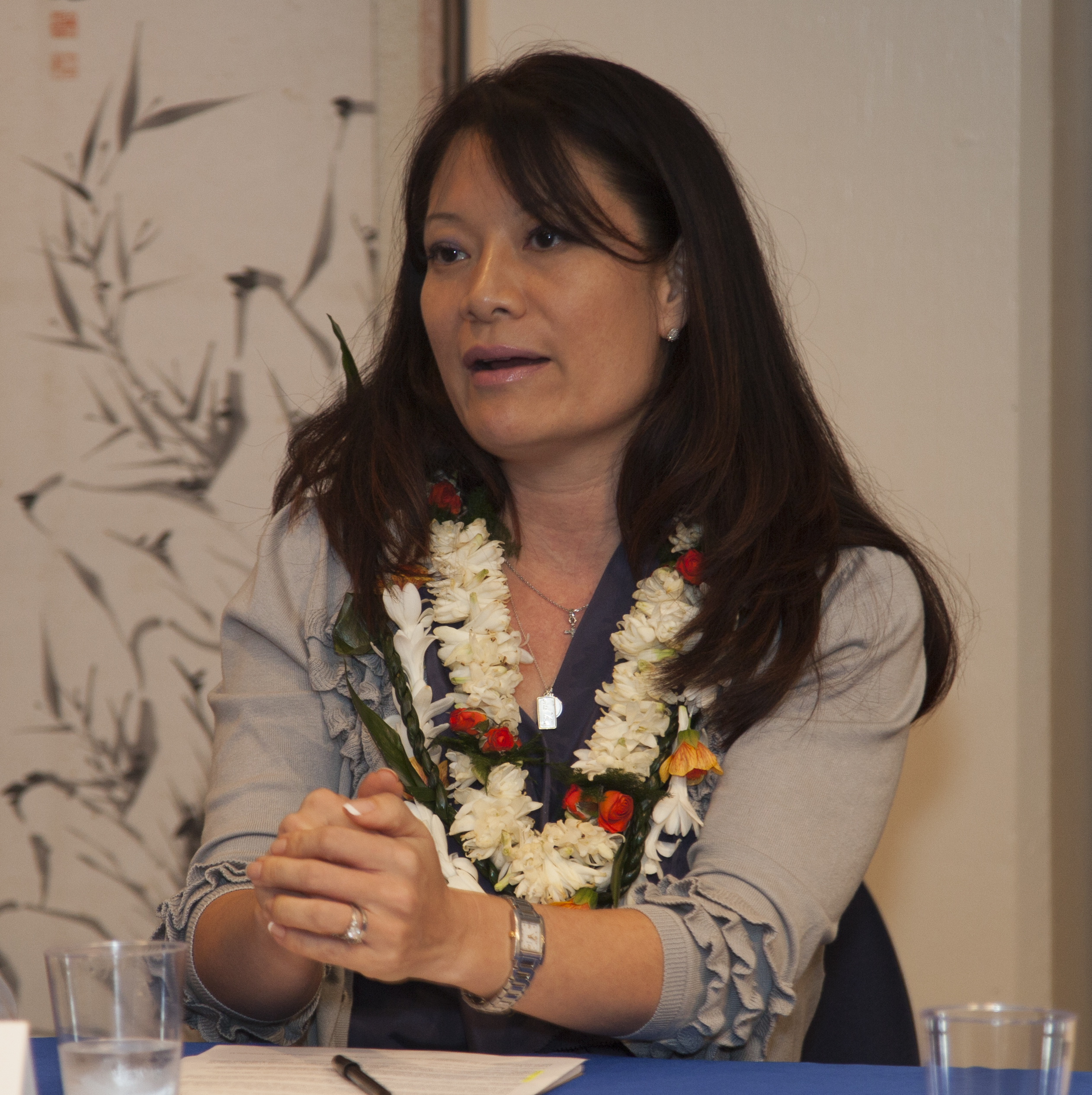
- Har in 2013

Member of the Hawaii House of Representatives from the 42nd district 40th (2006–2012)
- In office November 2006 – November 8, 2022
- Preceded by: Mark Moses
- Succeeded by: Diamond Garcia

Personal details
- Party: Democratic
- Education: Mount Holyoke College (BA); UIC John Marshall Law School (JD)
- Profession: Lawyer
- Website: rephar.com

Sharon E. Har is an American politician. She served as a member of the Hawaii House of Representatives for District 42 from January 16, 2013 to November 8, 2022 for the Democratic Party. She was succeeded by Diamond Garcia (R). Har served consecutively from January 2007 to January 2013 in the District 40 seat.

== Early life and education ==
Har was born in Springfield, Illinois, to Korean American parents Chester Chiduk Ha and Katherine Kyunhee Ha.

Har earned a BA in political science and sociology at Mount Holyoke College, attended William S. Richardson School of Law for a semester, and earned her JD from John Marshall Law School.

== Elections ==
- 2020 – On August 8, 2020, Har defeated Vickie L.P. Kam with 4,080 votes (69.0%) during the Democratic primary and was subsequently elected because there was no Republican nominee.
- 2018 – On August 11, 2018, Har defeated Jake Schaefer with 3,018 votes (74.5%) during the Democratic primary and was subsequently elected because there was no Republican nominee.
- 2016 – Har ran unopposed and won the uncontested election during the primary with 2,690 votes (85,1%) on August 13, 2016.
- 2014 – Har won the August 9, 2014 Democratic Primary with 2,883 votes (70.1%). On November 4, 2014, Har defeated Suk Moses, wife of former Representative Mark Moses, with 5,134 votes (69.1%) against Moses' 2,073 votes (27.9%).
- 2012 – Redistricted to District 42, and with Democratic Representative Rida Cabanilla redistricted to District 41, Har and Marissa Capelouto, her 2010 Republican opponent, were both unopposed for their August 11, 2012 primaries, setting up a rematch; Har won the November 6, 2012 General election with 6,251 votes (70.4%) against Capelouto.
- 2010 – Har won the September 18, 2010 Democratic Primary with 3,743 votes (75.3%), and won the November 2, 2010 General election with 6,170 votes (65.1%) against Republican nominee Marissa Capelouto.
- 2008 – Har was unopposed for the September 20, 2008 Democratic Primary, winning with 2,576 votes, and won the November 4, 2008 General election with 7,294 votes (66.1%) against Republican nominee Jack Legal.
- 2006 – Challenging incumbent Republican Representative Mark Moses for the District 40 seat, Har won the September 26, 2006 Democratic Primary with 2,558 votes (62.7%), and won the November 7, 2006 General election with 3,997 votes (51.7%) against Moses.
