= Divergent question =

A divergent question is a question with no specific answer, but rather exercises one's ability to think broadly about a certain topic.

== In education ==
Popular in inquiry education, divergent questions allow students to explore different avenues and create many different variations and alternative answers or scenarios. Correctness may be determined through logical reasoning, contextual understanding, or derived from basic knowledge, conjecture, inference, projection, creativity, intuition, or imagination. Such questions often require students to analyze, synthesize, or evaluate existing knowledge and subsequently project or predict possible outcomes.

A simple example of a divergent question is:

Write down as many different uses as you can think of for the following objects: (1) a brick, (2) a blanket.

== See also ==
- Divergent thinking – Process of generating creative ideas
- Lateral thinking – Manner of solving problems
