= Roy Takumi =

American politician (born 1952)

Roy M. Takumi

Member of the Hawaii House of Representatives from the 35th district 36th (1992–2012)
- In office November 1992 – November 2022
- Preceded by: Redistricted
- Succeeded by: Redistricted

Personal details
- Born: October 13, 1952 (age 73) Honolulu, Hawaii
- Party: Democratic
- Education: Long Island University; University of Hawaiʻi

Military service
- Branch/service: Hawaii Air National Guard
- Years of service: 1970–1977

Roy M. Takumi (born October 13, 1952 in Honolulu, Hawaii) is an American politician and a former member of the Hawaii House of Representatives for 30 years. He represented District 35 from 2012 until 2022 and consecutively served from 1992 until 2012 in the District 36 seat. In May 2024, Takumi was appointed to lead the Hawaii Board of Education.

== Education ==
Takumi attended Maemae Elementary School, Kawananakoa Middle School, and President William McKinley High School. He earned his Bachelor of Arts in education from Long Island University and his Master's degree in public administration from the University of Hawaiʻi.

== Career ==
Takumi was first elected to the Hawaii House of Representatives in 1992. From 2002–2017, Takumi chaired the House Committee on Education. As committee chair, Takumi sponsored the Reinventing Education Act of 2004 and helped establish the Executive Office on Early Learning in 2012. He served as vice chair of the Education Commission of the States from 2013-2017.

== Elections ==
- 1992 Takumi won the three-way September 19, 1992 Democratic Primary with 1,441 votes (54.5%), and was unopposed for the November 3, 1992 General election.
- 1994 Takumi was unopposed for both the September 17, 1994 Democratic Primary, winning with 2,589 votes, and the November 8, 1994 General election.
- 1996 Takumi won the three-way September 21, 1996 Democratic Primary with 1,877 votes (48.1%), and won the November 5, 1996 General election with 3,968 votes (72.9%) against Republican nominee Holly Kuehu.
- 1998 Takumi won the September 19, 1998 Democratic Primary by 8 votes with 1,310 votes (48.8%) against Alex Sonson, and won the November 3, 1998 General election with 4,859 votes (76.4%) against Republican nominee John Nuusa.
- 2000 Takumi won the September 23, 2000 Democratic Primary with 1,987 votes (49.9%) in a rematch against his 1998 primary opponent Alex Sonson, and Republican John Nuusa was unopposed for his primary, setting up a rematch in the general election; Takumi won the November 5, 2002 General election with 3,968 votes (72.6%) against Nuusa; Sonson and Nuusa faced each other directly in the District 35 2002 General election, with Takumi serving alongside Sonson from 2003 until 2009.
- 2002 Takumi won the September 21, 2002 Democratic Primary with 2,601 votes (58.0%), and won the November 5, 2002 General election with 5,649 votes (65.7%) against Republican nominee Chris Prendergast.
- 2004 Takumi was unopposed for the September 18, 2004 Democratic Primary, winning with 3,848 votes, and won the November 2, 2004 General election with 6,689 votes (75.1%) against Republican nominee Jamie Kese.
- 2006 Takumi was unopposed for the September 26, 2006 Democratic Primary, winning with 4,395 votes, and won the November 7, 2006 General election with 5,721 votes (76.8%) against Republican nominee Jerilyn Anderton.
- 2008 Takumi was unopposed for the September 20, 2008 Democratic Primary, winning with 3,481 votes, and won the November 4, 2008 General election with 6,903 votes (77.4%) against a nonpartisan candidate, who received 61.
- 2010 Takumi was unopposed for the September 18, 2010 Democratic Primary, winning with 4,144 votes, and won the November 2, 2010 General election with 4,806 votes (59.8%) against Republican nominee Reed Shiraki.
- 2012 Redistricted to District 35, and with Democratic Representative Henry Aquino redistricted to District 38, Takumi was unopposed for both the August 11, 2012 Democratic Primary, winning with 3,262 votes, and the November 6, 2012 General election.
