= The Global Trap =

Book by Hans-Peter Martin and Harald Schumann

The Global Trap: Globalization and the Assault on Democracy and Prosperity
- First edition
- Original title: Die Globalisierungsfalle: Der Angriff auf Demokratie und Wohlstand
- Language: German
- Subject: Globalisation; Technology and society
- Published: 1996 Rowohlt Verlag
- Publication place: Germany
- Media type: Print (paperback and hardcover)
- Pages: 351 pp (first edition)

Die Globalisierungsfalle: Der Angriff auf Demokratie und Wohlstand is a 1996 non-fiction book by Hans-Peter Martin (born 1957 in Bregenz, Austria), and Harald Schumann (born 1957 in Kassel, Germany), that describes possible implications of current trends in globalization. It was published in English as The Global Trap: Globalization and the Assault on Democracy and Prosperity in 1997. At this time, both authors were editors of the news magazine Der Spiegel. From 1999 to 2014, Hans-Peter Martin, who is stated in the book to be one of just three journalists to be allowed to take part in all activities at the Fairmont convention, was a member of the European Parliament.

The book was a best-seller in the authors‘ native Austria and Germany and went on to be a worldwide bestseller with over 800,000 copies sold and translated into 27 languages.

In particular, the book is known for defining a possible "20/80 society". In this possible society of the 21st century, 20 percent of the working age population will be enough to keep the world economy going. The other 80 percent live on some form of welfare and are entertained with a concept called "tittytainment", which aims at keeping the 80 percent of frustrated citizens happy with a mixture of deadeningly predictable, lowest common denominator entertainment for the soul and nourishment for the body.

== Contents ==
The book deals mainly with the effects of globalization. It describes a growing social divide as a result of "delimitation" of the economy and a loss of political control by the state over the economic development, which is increasingly controlled by global corporations. The authors warn of a so-called "20-to-80-society". They describe how a global 80:20 distribution already exists in many aspects, and illustrate possible economic, social and political consequences of free trade and deregulated financial markets.

In the beginning, they describe how at a conference at the invitation of Mikhail Gorbachev with 500 leading politicians, business leaders and academics from all continents from September 27 - October 1, 1995 at the Fairmont Hotel in San Francisco, the term "one-fifth-society" arose. The authors describe an increase in productivity caused by the decrease in the amount of work, so this could be done by one-fifth of the global labor force and leave four-fifths of the working age people out of work. The authors predict huge number of unemployed, perhaps finding themselves in low-paid voluntary community services to boost their morale.

== See also ==
- Pareto principle, 80:20 principle in practically all aspects of human lives was also discovered a century before this by the economist Vilfredo Pareto
- Criticisms of globalization
- Technopoly
- The Future and Its Enemies
- Bread and circuses
