= Information–action ratio =

Information theory concept

The information–action ratio is a concept coined by cultural critic Neil Postman in his work Amusing Ourselves to Death. In short, Postman meant to indicate the relationship between a piece of information and what action, if any, a consumer of that information might reasonably be expected to take once learning it.

In a speech to the German Informatics Society (Gesellschaft für Informatik) on October 11, 1990, in Stuttgart, sponsored by IBM-Germany, Neil Postman said the following: "The tie between information and action has been severed. Information is now a commodity that can be bought and sold, or used as a form of entertainment, or worn like a garment to enhance one's status. It comes indiscriminately, directed at no one in particular, disconnected from usefulness; we are glutted with information, drowning in information, have no control over it, don't know what to do with it."

In Amusing Ourselves to Death Postman frames the information-action ratio in the context of the telegraph's invention. Prior to the telegraph, Postman says people received information relevant to their lives, creating a high correlation between information and action: "The information-action ratio was sufficiently close so that most people had a sense of being able to control some of the contingencies in their lives” (p. 69).

The telegraph allowed bits of information to travel long distances, and so Postman claims "the local and the timeless ... lost their central position in newspapers, eclipsed by the dazzle of distance and speed ... Wars, crimes, crashes, fires, floods—much of it the social and political equivalent of Adelaide's whooping coughs—became the content of what people called 'the news of the day'" (pp. 66–67).

A high information-action ratio, therefore, refers to the helplessness people confront when faced with decontextualized information. Someone may know Adelaide has the whooping cough, but what could anyone do about it? Postman said that this kind of access to decontextualized information "made the relationship between information and action both abstract and remote." Information consumers were "faced with the problem of a diminished social and political potency."

== Cultural references ==
The term was referenced in Arctic Monkeys' song "Four Out of Five" of the band's 2018 album Tranquility Base Hotel & Casino, where the Information Action Ratio is the name of a fictional taqueria on the hotel based on the Moon.

== See also ==
- Information overload
