= The Future and Its Enemies =

1998 book by Virginia Postrel

- 1998 U.S. hardcover edition
- Author: Virginia Postrel
- Language: English
- Publisher: Free Press
- Publication date: 1998
- Publication place: United States
- Media type: Print (Paperback and Hardcover)
- Pages: 265
- ISBN: 0-684-82760-3
- Preceded by: N/A

The Future and Its Enemies: The Growing Conflict Over Creativity, Enterprise, and Progress is a 1998 book by the American journalist Virginia Postrel, then editor of the libertarian magazine Reason. Postrel argues that a division between "dynamism" and "stasis" has become the most important conflict in American political life, replacing the left–right division inherited from the Cold War. "Dynamists" welcomes open-ended change generated by decentralized trial and error, while "stasists" desire a controlled or unchanging world. Drawing on Friedrich Hayek's account of spontaneous order and dispersed knowledge, the book defends dynamism across economics, technology, environmental policy, bioethics, and popular culture.

Postrel had first sketched the book's thesis in two 1990 essays before securing a book contract in 1995. Published by the Free Press in late 1998, the book was widely reviewed in American newspapers and political magazines. Columnists applied its framework to the New Economy of the 1990s and to urban politics, while critics questioned whether its analogies could support a political program and whether "dynamism" was more than a relabeling of libertarianism. Within a year of publication, Vanity Fair reported that the book had acquired "demi-cult status" in the technology industry.

Commentators in the 2020s have described it as a forerunner of the abundance movement in American policy debate. Postrel herself has continued to discuss "dynamism" and has stated that she would separate it more sharply from libertarianism.

== Background ==
When the book appeared, Postrel had edited Reason since 1989 and had previously written for The Wall Street Journal and Inc.. She has traced the book's argument to research on the ideology of the environmental movement she undertook for Reason's twentieth-anniversary Earth Day issue in 1990. The resulting essay, "The Green Road to Serfdom", concluded that the movement's unifying ideal was a stable, unchanging equilibrium, a vision she found inapt for human societies and, as she later said, mistaken in ecology.

An essay published the same month in The Washington Post, "The Ideology Shuffle", introduced a general statement of the framework. It argued that a division "between the proponents of economic dynamism and the advocates of stasis" was displacing the categories of left and right and would define the coming decade's disputes over trade, immigration, urban growth, and environmentalism. Postrel has said that her 1990 essays lacked the category of the technocrat, which she added while writing the book.

By 1995 she had organized a book proposal. Writing the book, she said, compelled her to consider what dynamism favored, not merely what it opposed. The book was written while she continued to edit Reason, and its acknowledgments credit the magazine's staff for making the research possible, as well as editors at The Washington Post, Wired, and Forbes ASAP, for which she wrote a technology column. The title, which invokes The Open Society and Its Enemies, was suggested by her husband, the economist Steven Postrel.

The book's primary intellectual debt is to Hayek, whom Postrel calls the "most important theorist" of dynamism. Other sources she draws on include Michael Polanyi on tacit knowledge, Karl Popper's account of knowledge as conjecture and refutation, Richard Epstein's Simple Rules for a Complex World, Aaron Wildavsky's contrast between resilience and anticipation, Mancur Olson and Jonathan Rauch on political sclerosis and interest groups, Jane Jacobs on cities, and Mihaly Csikszentmihalyi on play and flow.

== Synopsis ==
The book consists of an introduction and eight chapters. Postrel opens with the 1998 redesign of Disneyland's Tomorrowland, whose planners had abandoned the sleek, chrome futurism of the 1960s for one that mixed gardens, colors, and new rides. Critics took thos as proof that "the future" had failed. For Postrel the episode illustrates her theme: the future is not a single state to be planned but "an ongoing process" of testing and adjustment. How people feel about that open-ended process, whether they "search for stasis—a regulated, engineered world" or "embrace dynamism—a world of constant creation, discovery, and competition", is a divide that cuts across the established categories of left and right.

The first two chapters provide maps of the two main camps. Postrel's "stasists" come in two kinds, whom she finds equally on the right and the left. Reactionaries value stability and want to reverse change or restore a real or imagined past. Her examples include Pat Buchanan, Jeremy Rifkin, Kirkpatrick Sale, and Christopher Lasch. Technocrats value control and accept change only when it proceeds by plan, following Frederick Winslow Taylor's idea of "one best way" for managerial control. She places Al Gore, Ross Perot, and William Bennett in this group. Stasists converge on restrictions for trade, immigration, and new technology, but they split over which static future to impose. Dynamists, by contrast, share a belief in spontaneous order, experiment, and the limits of centralized knowledge, but lack a political identity. Postrel finds them among software developers, management writers, and urbanists such as Jane Jacobs. Borrowing from Hayek, she names dynamists "the party of life".

The middle chapters build the dynamist idea around four themes:

- Progress is "a process, not a product", the cumulative result of uncoordinated trials rather than a march toward a known destination. The knowledge a society depends on is dispersed and often tacit, which is why technocratic plans, from urban renewal to industrial policy, fail to create the predictability they assume.
- In a dynamist society, rules are simple: few, general, and infrequently changed. They run opposite the thicket of detailed regulation that comprise fields like cosmetology licensing, building regulations, and the tax code.
- Nature offers no fixed standard against which to see artifice, because natural systems are themselves dynamic and human beings are part of them. She turns this observation against environmentalist and bioethical criticisms of technologies like genetic engineering.
- Curiosity and delight are sources of creativity. Postrel frames "play" as a "technocrat's nightmare", recalling the chilly reaction Newt Gingrich received for celebrating beach volleyball.

The closing chapter invokes Daniel Boorstin's notion of an American "fertile verge", the creative frontier where cultures and ideologies mix and new forms emerge. Reviewing cases of national stagnation discussed by Joel Mokyr and Mancur Olson, Postrel posits a "sterile verge" in which ideologues and interest groups combine to block change through planning, litigation, and fear. She argues that dynamists must be bound by a shared love of learning and "the textures of life" rather than by fear of stasis or self-interest alone. The book ends: "We cannot build a single bridge from here to there, for neither here nor there is a single point. And there is no abyss to cross."

== Reviews ==
The Future and Its Enemies was widely—and largely favorably—reviewed in newsprint. In The Washington Post, James K. Glassman called it a "brilliant new book" that explained the resilience of the post-Cold War economy. In The New York Times, John Tierney applied the book's framework to New York's development history, casting city planner Robert Moses as "the ultimate stasist technocrat" and the following era of preservation regulations as stasism in a new form. In an later features essay for the Times, Ethan Bronner placed the book alongside Michael Lind's work as competing explanations for the blurring of left and right. He summarized Postrel's position as the claim that older political categories had lost their usefulness because the questions that produced them had been settled.

Reviews of the book also appeared in newspapers including The Washington Times, The Philadelphia Inquirer, The Baltimore Sun, the San Jose Mercury News, and the St. Petersburg Times, among other regional papers. (Note: Regional newspaper reviews of The Future and Its Enemies include: Walters, Colin (December 13, 1998). "Protecting the Future from "Stasism"". The Washington Times. Archived from the original on 2003-07-01.; Boldt, David. "Looking ahead to the future—unafraid". The Philadelphia Inquirer. Archived from the original on 2003-04-23.; Hirsch, Arthur (March 12, 1999). "How do you feel about the future?; Innovation: Virginia Postrel says most of us are not neutral. We're either stasists or dynamists". The Baltimore Sun.; Jacobs, Joanne (January 7, 1999). "Enjoy the roadless ride into the future". San Jose Mercury News. Archived from the original on 2003-04-23.; Blumner, Robyn E. (November 15, 1998). "A dangerous fear of science". St. Petersburg Times. Archived from the original on September 3, 2026.; Stephens, Steve (January 25, 1999). "Rules for economy make no more sense than rules for poker". The Columbus Dispatch. Archived from the original on 2004-02-27.; Greenhut, Steven (December 13, 1998). "Defining the fault lines for the future". The Orange County Register. Archived from the original on 2003-04-23.; Ramsey, Bruce (December 23, 1998). "When an upsetting change encroaches, let it be, let it be". Seattle Post-Intelligencer. Archived from the original on 2003-08-03.; Cohen, Laurence D. (March 7, 1999). "Somewhere, Entrepreneurs Scheme Without Bureaucrats Bothering Them". Hartford Courant. Archived from the original on July 9, 2025.; Leef, George C. "Political malady constricts flow of progress". The Detroit News. Archived from the original on 2003-04-23.) Kirkus Reviews credited the optimism of the argument as corrective to prevailing cultural pessimism.

The book's publication drew attention and competing sources of skepticism in the political press. The sociologist Alan Wolfe, writing in The New Republic, found the book "lively, engaging, and thought-provoking" but argued that its dynamist examples from nature and technology were "all metaphors" that did not cohere as a political agenda. In The Weekly Standard, the political scientist James W. Ceaser observed that dynamism departed from libertarianism by treating liberty as a means to progress rather than an end. Commentary claimed Postrel's dynamist–stasist dichotomy was "an attempt to repackage libertarianism" and that the left–right coalitions it described "were temporary and tactical."

Reviewers at neoconservative and paleolibertarian periodicals found other vantages for criticism. In The Public Interest, Hillel Fradkin called Postrel "perhaps the most vigorous defender" of a dynamist future and saw "the first political theory of the new dynamist world", but found its treatment so-called stasis "harshly polemical." He doubted that "playful" described most personal experience of work, and argued that Postrel "vastly overestimates the defects of the Right", since conservatives would defend the limited government her vision required. The Mises Institute's David Gordon stated that her case against technocrats ran "along familiar Hayekian lines" but described much of the book as "merely the author's statements of her own preferences".

== Influence ==
In November 1999, Vanity Fair reported that the book had "acquired demi-cult status in the high-tech world", counting Jeff Bezos and Bob Metcalfe among Postrel's admirers. The article observed that, while many political thinkers agreed that the categories of left and right was exhausted, Postrel had created an original, new axis to replace it. In his history of the libertarian movement, Brian Doherty later named Postrel, with Mises and Hayek, among the influences on Whole Foods Market founder John Mackey's effort to frame free markets as a progressive cause.

Reflecting on the book in 2022, Postrel said she regretted not distinguishing dynamism from libertarianism more directly, noting that the book deliberately took no position on questions such as redistribution and intellectual property. She gave more credence to the concern that rapid change can displace individuals and rupture communities. She maintained that stasism remained a durable bipartisan instinct, citing industrial-policy enthusiasm on the right and rising "purity" politics on both sides. She has since summarized dynamism as "a form of liberalism that centers learning as opposed to centering justice or centering freedom".

With the emergence of the abundance movement in the 2020s, several commentators revisited the book. Matthew Yglesias called it "extremely prescient on societal effects of rapid technological change" and credited Postrel's identification of a dynamism–stasis conflict in 1998, "when the general vibes of politics were extremely different". The Niskanen Center described the book as having "anticipated much of the current discourse around abundance" and named Postrel as the movement's "libertarian prophet." In a panel with Postrel, Ezra Klein, co-author of Abundance shared that he had re-read The Future and Its Enemies and accepted the label of "technocrat" for his own views. Johan Norberg, writing for the Cato Institute, invoked the book's main thesis to argue that "supply-side progressives" and national conservatives were planners with different endpoints.

== See also ==
- An Army of Davids
- The Constitution of Liberty
- The Death and Life of Great American Cities
- Seeing Like a State
