= Inquiry education =

Educational style

Inquiry education (sometimes known as the inquiry method) is a student-centered method of education focused on asking questions. Students are encouraged to ask questions which are meaningful to them, and which do not necessarily have easy answers; teachers are encouraged to avoid giving answers when this is possible, and in any case to avoid giving direct answers in favor of asking more questions. In this way it is similar in some respects to the Socratic method. The method was advocated by Neil Postman and Charles Weingartner in their book Teaching as a Subversive Activity.

While inquiry-based education is a teaching method that has been connected with Piaget's theory of cognitive development and other constructivists like Jean Piaget, there is some evidence that this sort of approach was already used by the rabbis as early as antiquity (with the Passover Seder serving as an exemplar of such educational interventions).

== Overview ==
The inquiry method is informed by Postman and Weingartner’s view that effective learners and critical thinkers concentrate on the dynamic process of inquiry itself, rather than focusing solely on the acquisition of static knowledge. They write that certain characteristics are common to all good learners, saying that all good learners have:

- Self-confidence in their learning ability
- Pleasure in problem solving
- A keen sense of relevance
- Reliance on their own judgment over other people's or society's
- No fear of being wrong
- No haste in answering
- Flexibility in point of view
- Respect for facts, and the ability to distinguish between fact and opinion
- No need for final answers to all questions, and comfort in not knowing an answer to difficult questions rather than settling for a simplistic answer

In an attempt to instill students with these qualities and behaviors, a teacher adhering to the inquiry method in pedagogy must behave very differently from a traditional teacher. Postman and Weingartner suggest that inquiry teachers have the following characteristics:

- They avoid telling students what they "ought to know".
- They talk to students mostly by questioning, and especially by asking divergent questions.
- They do not accept short, simple answers to questions.
- They encourage students to interact directly with one another, and avoid judging what is said in student interactions.
- They do not summarize students' discussion.
- They do not plan the exact direction of their lessons in advance, and allow it to develop in response to students' interests.
- Their lessons pose problems to students.
- They gauge their success by change in students' inquiry behaviors (with the above characteristics of "good learners" as a goal).

== Sources ==
- Klein, Reuven Chaim (2023), "The Passover Seder as an Exercise in Piagetian Education Theory" (PDF), Religious Education, 118 (4): 312–324, doi:10.1080/00344087.2023.2228189.
- Postman, Neil; Weingartner, Charles (1969), Teaching as a Subversive Activity, Dell.
