= Marie Winn =

American author (1936–2024)

- Born: Marie Wienerová; October 21, 1936; Prague, Czechoslovakia
- Died: December 25, 2024 (aged 88); New York City, U.S.
- Education: Radcliffe College; Columbia University
- Occupations: Journalist; author; bird-watcher
- Employer: The Wall Street Journal
- Notable work: The Plug-In Drug; Red-Tails in Love; Central Park in the Dark
- Relatives: Janet Malcolm (sister)
- Website: mariewinn.com

Marie Winn (née Wienerová; October 21, 1936 – December 25, 2024) was an American journalist, author, and bird-watcher. She is known for her books and articles on the wildlife of Central Park and her Wall Street Journal Leisure & Arts column. She appears in Frederic Lilien's documentary film, The Legend of Pale Male (2010). She is also known for writing The Plug-In Drug (1977), which explored the impact of television on young children, and for her involvement in the quiz show scandals of the 1950s. She died in New York City on December 25, 2024, at the age of 88.

== Early life ==
Born into a Jewish family in 1936 in Prague, Czechoslovakia, Winn was one of two daughters of Hanna (née Taussig) and Josef Wiener aka Joseph A. Winn, a psychiatrist; her sister was the writer Janet Malcolm. Winn was a U.S. citizen who attended the Bronx High School of Science, Radcliffe College and Columbia University.

In May 1958, while Winn was a contestant on Dotto, a knowledge-quiz type TV game, a notebook which belonged to her was found by another contestant, Ed Hilgemeier, who discovered that the notebook included questions and answers to be used during Winn's appearances. Jack Narz, the host of Dotto at the time, recalled, when interviewed for a PBS documentary, that he believed Winn to be "a little too pat" when giving her answers. A CBS executive vice president, Thomas Fisher, tested kinescopes of the show against Winn's notebook and concluded that the show appeared to have been fixed. The executives also learned the show's producers had paid Hilgemeier to keep quiet about the notebook.

== Writing career ==
=== The Plug-In Drug ===
Winn is the author of The Plug-In Drug (1977), an often scathing critique of television's addictive influence on the young, Winn wrote, "The television experience allows the participant to blot out the real world and enter into a pleasurable and passive mental state." In 2002, she added new material to update the study as The Plug-In Drug: Television, Computers, and Family Life, published on the 25th anniversary of the original book.

=== Pale Male ===
An advocate for the protection of wildlife, Winn gave the name Pale Male to the red-tailed hawk that nested on a Fifth Avenue building, receiving much press coverage. She was also prominent in preserving Pale Male's nest when it was threatened with removal. She wrote about these events in her book, Red-Tails in Love: Pale Male's Story – A True Wildlife Drama in Central Park (1998). The book is an expansion of her Smithsonian magazine articles and her column in The Wall Street Journal. Frederic Lilien's documentary film, Pale Male (2002), is an adaptation of Winn's book and includes interview scenes with Winn.

== Further listening ==
- Marie Winn interviewed on NPR's All Things Considered (12/10/04)

== Bibliography ==
- Winn, Marie. "What Became of Childhood Innocence?", The New York Times, January 25, 1981.
- Winn, Marie and Creshkoff, Rebekah. The Birds of Central Park: An Annotated Checklist (pdf)
- The Fireside Book of Children's Songs (Simon and Schuster, 1966)
- The Plug-In Drug (Penguin, 1977)
- Red-Tails in Love (Random House, 1998)
- Birds of Central Park by Cal Vornberger, foreword by Marie Winn (Abrams, 2005)
- Central Park in the Dark (FSG, 2008)
