= Jerry Mander =

American activist (1936–2023)

- Born: Jerry Irwin Mander; May 1, 1936; New York City, U.S.
- Died: April 11, 2023 (aged 86); Kukuihaele, Hawaii, U.S.
- Education: Lincoln High School; University of Pennsylvania (BS); Columbia University (MS)
- Occupations: Activist; author
- Spouse(s): Anica Vesel (m. 1965; div. 1982) Elizabeth Garsonnin (m. 1987, divorced) Koohan Paik (m. 2009)
- Children: 2

Jerry Irwin Mander (May 1, 1936 – April 11, 2023) was an American activist and author in San Francisco, known for his use of advertising for progressive and ecological causes and for his 1978 book, Four Arguments for the Elimination of Television.

== Early life and education ==
Mander was born in the Bronx, New York City, and raised in Yonkers, one of two children of Harry Mander, a garment worker who later started a company manufacturing clothing linings, and his wife Eva. Both of his parents were Jewish immigrants who had left Poland and Romania, respectively, to escape persecution.

Mander originally aspired to be a professional golfer. He graduated from Lincoln High School in 1953, and then earned a B.S. in economics from the Wharton School at the University of Pennsylvania in 1957, and an M.S. in international economics from Columbia University in 1959.

== Career ==
After working for a short time in public relations for Worthington Corporation in Newark, New Jersey, in 1960 Mander moved to San Francisco, where he was hired as a publicist for the San Francisco International Film Festival. He also co-promoted the psychedelic Trips Festival in 1966; worked for the modern dancer Anna Halprin, accompanying her on a European tour as her manager; and with Ernest Callenbach, founded the first art-house cinema in San Francisco. In 1966, he joined Howard Gossage's advertising agency, which became Freeman, Mander & Gossage after Mander became a partner. Clients included the comedy troupes the Committee, for whom Mander ran a full-page ad in the San Francisco Chronicle announcing a competition to donate war toys to be air-dropped on the Pentagon, and Firesign Theater. After Gossage's death in 1969, the firm broke up and Mander became independent. He co-founded Public Interest Communications to assist individuals and nonprofits, then joined the Public Media Center, where he remained for 20 years as a senior fellow.

In 1966, while at Freeman & Gossage, Mander created an ad campaign for the Sierra Club that is largely credited with stopping a U.S. Government plan to dam the Colorado River in the Grand Canyon in order to raise the level of the river and to generate hydropower. Mander's newspaper ads, with headlines like "Should We Also Flood the Sistine Chapel So Tourists Can Get Nearer the Ceiling?" and "Now Only You Can Save Grand Canyon From Being Flooded ... For Profit", included coupons for readers to clip and mail to the President and the Secretary of the Interior. The Sierra Club remained a client; another was Planned Parenthood, for whom he created a 1985 abortion rights campaign that also included coupons for readers to mail to officials, in addition to photos of two women with their accounts of obtaining illegal abortions, and of a firebombed abortion clinic. His last major campaign, the Turning Point Project for the Foundation for Deep Ecology, encompassed 25 weekly full-page ads in the New York Times on a range of ecological topics. The Wall Street Journal called him "the Ralph Nader of advertising.

Mander was program director at the Foundation for Deep Ecology, and in 1994 founded the International Forum on Globalization, a multi-national think tank in counterpoint to the World Trade Organization and the North American Free Trade Agreement that held sold-out teach-ins and launched the anti-corporatist movement. He served as its executive director until 2009, when he became a Distinguished Fellow. In 2007, he appeared in the documentary film What a Way to Go: Life at the End of Empire.

Mander published eight non-fiction books, the best known being Four Arguments for the Elimination of Television in 1978, in which he argued that television paves the way for autocracy by isolating viewers and dulling their minds. In 2022 he published a memoir through the prism of his advertising work for transformative causes, 70 Ads to Save the World.

== Personal life and death ==
In 1965, Mander married feminist author Anica Vesel. They had two sons, Kai and Yari. They divorced in 1982; she died in 2002. He remarried in 1987 to Elizabeth Garsonnin, a filmmaker and colleague at the Public Media Center, from whom he was also divorced, and in 2009 to Koohan Paik, also a filmmaker. They split their time between his longtime home in Bolinas, California, and her home in Hawaii.

Mander died at home in Kukuihaele, Hawaii, on April 11, 2023, at the age of 86. According to family, the cause was prostate cancer.

== Works ==
- The Great International Paper Airplane Book, with George Dippel and Howard Gossage (1971) ISBN 0-671-21129-3
- Four Arguments for the Elimination of Television (1978) ISBN 0-688-08274-2
- In the Absence of the Sacred: The Failure of Technology and the Survival of the Indian Nations, Sierra Club Books (1991) ISBN 978-0-87156-509-9
- The Case Against the Global Economy and for a Turn Toward the Local, with Edward Goldsmith (1996) ISBN 0-87156-865-9.
- Alternatives to Economic Globalization: A Better World Is Possible, Contributor, with the International Forum on Globalization Alternatives Task Force (2004) ISBN 1-57675-303-4, ISBN 978-1-57675-303-3.
- Paradigm Wars: Indigenous Peoples' Resistance to Globalization, with Victoria Tauli-Corpuz (2006) ISBN 1-57805-132-0
- The Superferry Chronicles: Hawaii’s Uprising Against Militarism, Commercialism, and the Desecration of the Earth, with Koohan Paik, Koa Books (2008) ISBN 978-0-9773338-8-2
- The Capitalism Papers: Fatal Flaws of an Obsolete System (2012) ISBN 978-1582437170
- 70 Ads to Change the World: An Illustrated Memoir of Social Change (2022) ISBN 978-0907791812

== See also ==
- Anarcho-primitivism
- Deep ecology
