= Mary Tiles =

British American philosopher and academic

Mary Tiles (born March 6, 1946) is an American philosopher and historian of mathematics and science. From 2006 until 2009, she served as chair of the philosophy department of the University of Hawaii at Manoa. She retired in 2009.

== Life ==
At Bristol University, Tiles obtained her B.A. in philosophy and mathematics in 1967, and her Ph.D. in philosophy in 1973, followed by a B.Phil. in philosophy in 1974 at Oxford and a M.A. in 1978 at Cambridge. After positions as lecturer and visiting associate professor at different institutions, Tiles became associate professor of philosophy at University of Hawaii at Manoa in 1989, and full professor in 1992.

== Work ==
Tiles' area of work is primarily philosophy and history of logic, mathematics and science, with a special emphasis on French contributions to this area, e.g. by Gaston Bachelard, Georges Canguilhem, Bruno Latour, Michel Foucault, Pierre Bourdieu, Michel Serres, Jean-Claude Martzloff, Karine Chemla, Catherine Jami, and François Jullien.

One of her publications is the 1989 book The Philosophy of Set Theory: An Historical Introduction to Cantor's Paradise. As the subtitle suggests, it is an example of a book that treats the philosophy of mathematics as inseparable from historical concerns. Despite some criticisms, for its lack of technical detail and correctness, and for pressing the author's philosophical agenda on its readers, it has been recommended as an introductory textbook for undergraduates interested in the philosophy of mathematics.

== Bibliography ==
- with Hans Oberdiek, Living in a Technological Culture: Human Tools and Human Values, Routledge 1995.
- with Jim Tiles, An Introduction to Historical Epistemology: The Authority of Knowledge, Oxford 1993.
- Mathematics and the Image of Reason, Routledge 1991.
- The Philosophy of Set Theory: An Historical Introduction to Cantor's Paradise, Blackwell 1989; reprinted by Dover 2004.
- Bachelard: Science and Objectivity, Cambridge University Press 1984.
