= The End of Education =

1995 book by Neil Postman

The End of Education: Redefining the Value of School
- First edition
- Author: Neil Postman
- Language: English
- Genre: Education
- Publisher: Knopf
- Publication date: 1995
- Publication place: United States
- Media type: Print (Paperback)
- Pages: 203 pp
- ISBN: 0-679-75031-2
- OCLC: 35855556

The End of Education is a 1995 book by Neil Postman about public education in the United States. The use of the word "end" in the title has two meanings: primarily, as a synonym for "purpose", but also as a prediction about the future of public schools if they do not successfully identify and communicate a convincing purpose for their existence within human culture.

== Content ==
=== Part I ===
Postman begins by emphasizing the difference between education and schooling:

"To the young, schooling seems relentless, but we know it is not. What is relentless is our education, which, for good or ill, gives us no rest. That is why poverty is a great educator. Having no boundaries and refusing to be ignored, it mostly teaches hopelessness. But not always. Politics is also a great educator. Mostly, it teaches, I am afraid, cynicism. But not always. Television is a great educator as well. Mostly it teaches consumerism. But not always." (pg. ix.)

Postman believes that schools' primary social function is to create a common culture among citizens through the communication of unifying purpose-giving narratives rather than to simply initiate children into the economy.

“The idea of public education depends absolutely on the existence of shared narratives and the exclusion of narratives that lead to alienation and divisiveness. What makes public schools public is not so much that the schools have common goals but that the students have common gods. The reason for this is that public education does not serve a public. It creates a public.” (pg. 17)

Furthermore, he feels American education has drifted away from its founding narratives of democracy and individual rights, replaced by the narratives of economic utility and the belief in technology as the measure of humanity's progress. Postman believes that the school system's current narratives at best fail to sufficiently inspire and, all too often, fail to communicate anything at all. Chief among the failing gods is economic utility, the view of school's highest purpose as preparation for the workplace.

"The preparation for making a living... is well served by any decent education." (pg. 32, 33) “Here it is necessary to say that no reasonable argument can be made against educating the young to be consumers or to think about the kinds of employment that might interest them. But when these are elevated to the status of a metaphysical imperative, we are being told that we have reached the end of our wits—even worse, the limit of our wisdom.” (pg. 35,36)

=== Part II ===
In the second part of the book, Postman proposes 5 narratives as possible alternatives to the current ones:

- "Spaceship Earth" (the notion of humans as stewards of the planet)
- "The Fallen Angel" (a view of history and the advancement of knowledge as a series of errors and corrections)
- "The American Experiment" (the story of America as a great experiment and as a center of continuous argument)
- "The Laws of Diversity" (the view that difference contributes to increased vitality and excellence, and, ultimately, to a sense of unity)
- "The Word Weavers/The World Makers" (the understanding that the world is created through language — through definitions, questions, and metaphors)
