= James W. Ceaser =

American political philosopher

James Ceaser
- Born: James Wilbur Ceaser
- Occupation: Harry F. Byrd Professor of Politics
- Awards: Bradley Prize

Academic background
- Education: Kenyon College (BA); Harvard University (PhD)
- Influences: Plato, Aristotle, Jefferson, Madison, Tocqueville

James Wilbur Ceaser is an American political scientist. He is the Harry F. Byrd Professor of Politics, and the director of the Program on Constitutionalism and Democracy, at the University of Virginia, where he has taught since 1976. In addition to his work at UVA, Ceaser is a senior fellow at the Hoover Institution at Stanford University, has held visiting fellowships at Harvard University, Princeton University, Oxford University, the University of Rennes, and the University of Bordeaux, and been a Fulbright teacher at the University of Basel and the University of Florence.

== Education ==
Ceaser was educated at Kenyon College (B.A.), Cornell University, and Harvard University (Ph.D.) where he studied under Walter Berns, Allan Bloom, James Q. Wilson, Harvey Mansfield, and Walter Dean Burnham. His dissertation, "Presidential Selection: Theory and Development," was published by Princeton University Press in 1979.

== Academic career ==
Ceaser is a well-known scholar of American politics and political philosophy. His notable books include Liberal Democracy and Political Science (Johns Hopkins University Press, 1992), Reconstructing America (Yale University Press, 1997), and Nature and History in American Political Development (Harvard University Press, 2008). Since 2004, Ceaser has served as the chairman of the Academic Council of the Jack Miller Center for the Teaching of America's Founding Principles and History. In 2006, he founded the Program on Constitutionalism and Democracy at the University of Virginia. In 2015, Ceaser received the Jeane Kirkpatrick Prize for Academic Freedom from the Bradley Foundation.
