= Koa Books =

Book publisher

Koa Books was a publishing company based in Kihei, Hawaiʻi. It was founded in 2005 by Arnie Kotler. The company was named after the koa tree. Koa Books gave its goal as publishing works that foster "a deeper understanding of personal transformation, social justice, and Hawaiʻi".

Books published by Koa include Daughters of Fire by Tom Peek, a 2013 Independent Book Publishers Association Benjamin Franklin Silver Finalist Award winner for Popular Fiction; Nation Within: The History of the American Occupation of Hawaii, by Tom Coffman; and Dissent: Voices of Conscience by Ann Wright and Susan Dixon.

Koa Books became an imprint of The Chiron Group in 2016.
