= Neil Postman =

American media theorist and cultural critic (1931–2003)

- Neil Postman
- Born: March 8, 1931; New York City, U.S.
- Died: October 5, 2003 (aged 72); New York City, U.S.
- Education: State University of New York at Fredonia; Columbia University
- Occupations: Writer, professor
- Spouse: Shelley Ross
- Children: 3, including Marc
- Writing career
- Period: 1959–2003
- Subjects: Media ecology; Media criticism; cultural criticism; education

Neil Postman (March 8, 1931 – October 5, 2003) was an American author, educator, media theorist, and cultural critic who eschewed digital technology, including personal computers and mobile devices, and was critical of the use of personal computers in schools. He is best known for 20 books about technology and education, including Teaching as a Subversive Activity (1970), The Disappearance of Childhood (1982), Amusing Ourselves to Death (1985), Conscientious Objections (1988), Technopoly: The Surrender of Culture to Technology (1992) and The End of Education: Redefining the Value of School (1995).

== Early life and education ==
Postman was born to a Jewish family in New York City, where he spent most of his life. In 1953, he graduated from the State University of New York at Fredonia and enlisted in the military but was released less than five months later. At Teachers College, Columbia University, he was awarded a master's degree in 1955 and an Ed.D. (Doctor of Education) in 1958.

== Career ==
Postman took a position with San Francisco State University's English Department in 1958. In 1959, he began teaching at New York University (NYU).

In 1971, at NYU's Steinhardt School of Education, Postman founded a graduate program in media ecology. He became the School of Education's only University Professor in 1993, and chaired the Department of Culture and Communication until 2002.

Postman received an honorary doctorate from Brigham Young University in 2000.

== Personal life ==
On October 5, 2003, Postman died from lung cancer at a hospital in Flushing, Queens. He was 72. He had been married to Shelley Ross Postman for 48 years. They had three children and were longtime residents of Flushing.

== Works ==
External videos
- "Life and Career of Neil Postman", January 14, 1988, C-SPAN

Postman wrote 20 books and more than 200 articles in academic and popular publications, including The New York Times Magazine, The Atlantic Monthly, Harper's Magazine, Time, Saturday Review, Harvard Educational Review, The Washington Post, the Los Angeles Times, Stern, and Le Monde. He was the editor of the quarterly journal ETC: A Review of General Semantics from 1976 to 1986. In 1976, Postman taught a course at NYU on CBS-TV's Sunrise Semester called "Communication: the Invisible Environment". He was also a contributing editor at The Nation. Several of his articles were reprinted after his death in ETC: A Review of General Semantics as part of a 75th anniversary edition in October 2013.

== On education ==
In 1969 and 1970, Postman collaborated with the New Rochelle educator Alan Shapiro on developing a model school based on the principles expressed in Teaching as a Subversive Activity. In that book, Postman and co-author Charles Weingartner suggest that many schools have curricula that are trivial and irrelevant to students' lives. The result of their critique was the "Program for Inquiry, Involvement, and Independent Study" at New Rochelle High School. This "open school" experiment lasted 15 years, and many programs following these principles were developed at U.S. high schools, such as Walter Koral's language class at the Village School in Great Neck, New York.

In his 1973 address "The Ecology of Learning" at the Conference on English Education, Postman proposed seven changes for schools that build on the critique expressed in Teaching as a Subversive Activity. First, he proposed that schools be "convivial communities" for learning rather than places that try to control students through judgment and punishment. Second, he suggested that schools should either discard or dramatically change grading practices that lead to competition in school rather than an attitude of learning. He also proposed getting rid of homogeneous groupings of students that reinforce social and economic inequalities, standardized tests that promote competition and permanent records used to punish and control students. Proactively, he suggested that industries and professional schools, rather than K-12 schools, develop criteria for selecting students and that schools should focus on civic education that teaches students their rights as citizens.

Later in his career, Postman moved away from his work in Teaching as a Subversive Activity with the publication of Teaching as a Conserving Activity. In it, he calls for schools to act as a counter to popular culture dominated by television and highlights the need for literacy education. Postman also argues that teachers must separate themselves from students in dress and speech, offering children an alternative role model. He was concerned with the degradation of the culture caused by technology and saw education as a means of conserving important cultural ideas.

In a 1995 interview on PBS's MacNeil/Lehrer NewsHour, Postman spoke about his opposition to personal computers in schools. He felt that school was a place to learn together as a cohesive group and that it should not be used for individualized learning. Postman also worried that the personal computer would diminish socializing as citizens and human beings.

== Amusing Ourselves to Death ==
One of Postman's most influential works is Amusing Ourselves to Death: Public Discourse in the Age of Show Business. In it, he argues that by expressing ideas through visual imagery, television reduces politics, news, history and other serious topics to entertainment. He worried that culture would decline if people became an audience and their public business a "vaudeville act". He also argued that television was destroying the "serious and rational public conversation" sustained for centuries by the printing press and before that by our oral culture. Rather than the restricted information in George Orwell's 1984, he said the flow of distraction we experience is akin to Aldous Huxley's Brave New World.

== Technopoly ==
External videos
- Booknotes interview with Postman on Technopoly, August 30, 1992, C-SPAN

In his 1992 book Technopoly: the Surrender of Culture to Technology, Postman defines "technopoly" as a society that believes "the primary, if not the only, goal of human labor and thought is efficiency, that technical calculation is in all respects superior to human judgment ... and that the affairs of citizens are best guided and conducted by experts".

In a C-SPAN interview, Postman called technopoly "the tendency in American culture to turn over to technology sovereignty, command, control over all of our social institutions".

Postman argued that the U.S. is the only country to have become a technopoly. He said it has been inundated by technophiles who do not see technology's downside. Technophiles want more technology and thus more information. But according to Postman, it is impossible for a technological innovation to have only a one-sided effect. With the amount of information available, Postman writes, "Information has become a form of garbage, not only incapable of answering the most fundamental human questions but barely useful in providing coherent direction to the solution of even mundane problems."

Postman did not oppose all forms of technology. In Technopoly, he agrees that technological advancements, specifically "the telephone, ocean liners, and especially the reign of hygiene", have lengthened and improved life. In his words, this shows he is not a "one-eyed technophobe".

In Technopoly, Postman writes that Luddism is often associated with naive opposition to technology but that the historical Luddites simply wanted to preserve their rights and way of life before the advancement of new technologies.

== Selected bibliography ==
External videos
- Presentation by Postman on Building a Bridge to the 18th Century, December 1, 1999

- Television and the Teaching of English (1961).
- Linguistics: A Revolution in Teaching, with Charles Weingartner (Dell Publishing, 1966).
- Teaching as a Subversive Activity, with Charles Weingartner (Delacorte Press, 1969).
- "Bullshit and the Art of Crap-Detection" – speech given at National Convention for the Teachers of English (1969)
- The Soft Revolution: A Student Handbook for Turning Schools Around, with Charles Weingartner (Delacorte Press, 1971).
- The School Book: For People Who Want to Know What All the Hollering Is About, with Charles Weingartner (Delacorte Press, 1973).
- Crazy Talk, Stupid Talk: How We Defeat Ourselves by the Way We Talk and What to Do About It (1976). Postman's introduction to general semantics.
- Teaching as a Subversive Activity (1979).
- The Disappearance of Childhood (1982).
- Amusing Ourselves to Death: Public Discourse in the Age of Show Business (1985).
- Conscientious Objections: Stirring Up Trouble About Language, Technology and Education (1988).
- How to Watch TV News, with Steve Powers (1992).
- Technopoly: The Surrender of Culture to Technology (1992).
- The End of Education: Redefining the Value of School (1995).
- Building a Bridge to the 18th Century: How the Past Can Improve Our Future (1999).
- MacNeil, R. (Writer/Host).Visions of Cyberspace: With Charlene Hunter Gault (July 25, 1995). Arlington, Virginia: MacNeil/Lehrer Productions.
