= California Business and Consumer Services Agency =

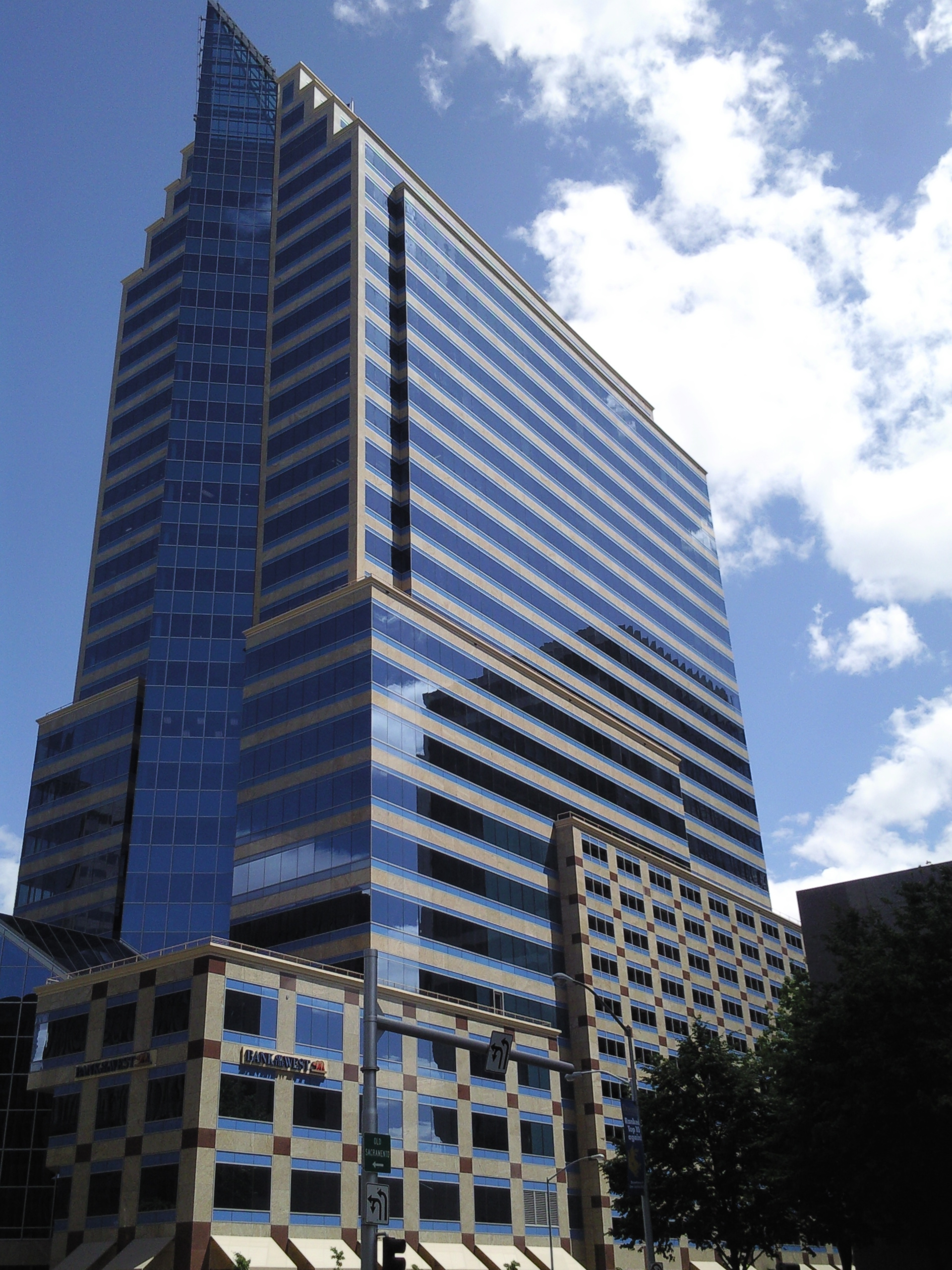
- Agency headquarters at the BMO Tower

Agency overview
- Formed: July 1, 2026
- Preceding agency: Business, Consumer Services and Housing Agency
- Jurisdiction: Government of California
- Headquarters: Sacramento, California
- Agency executive: Rohit Chopra, Secretary
- Website: bcsa.ca.gov

The California Business and Consumer Services Agency (BCSA) is a cabinet-level agency of the California state government which is tasked with implementing state policies on business and consumer services. The BCSA became active by July 1, 2026, splitting from the former California Business, Consumer Services and Housing Agency. The agency is led by Rohit Chopra, who previously served as director of the federal Consumer Financial Protection Bureau (CFPB) and as a member of the Federal Trade Commission.

== Background ==
In 2025, as part of the reorganization of the BCSH within the budget, Governor Gavin Newsom proposed spinning off the California Department of Housing and Community Development, along with the California Interagency Council on Homelessness, California Housing Finance Agency and the Civil Rights Department, into a separate cabinet-level superagency, the California Housing and Homelessness Agency (CHHA), as well as the creation of a Housing Development and Finance Committee (HDFC) within the new agency to streamline policies on affordable multifamily housing funds. The proposal would also rename the remaining agency as the Business and Consumer Services Agency (BCSA), and designate secretaries for both agencies. The spinoff of the CHHA is motivated in part to the ongoing California housing shortage, as well as the growth of enforcement powers attributed to the HCD since 2017.

Newsom submitted his proposal to the Little Hoover Commission on April 4, 2025. On May 29, the commission favorably recommended the proposal to the Legislature with additional recommendations, including allowing the creation of a “one-stop shop” for state financial assistance to build affordable housing to go into effect immediately.

The proposal was submitted to the 2025 session of the Legislature on May 14, 2025, with the legislature having until July 4 to consider the proposal. Absent legislative rejection by simple majority in either house, the plan took effect on July 5, 2025. Implementation of the plan took effect by July 1, 2026, by which time the BCSH dissolved and both the CHHA and BCSA became active.

On 14 May 2026, Newsom appointed Rohit Chopra as Secretary of the BCSA. Chopra was sworn in on July 1, 2026.

== Organization ==
- Department of Consumer Affairs (DCA)
- Department of Financial Protection and Innovation (DFPI)
- Department of Real Estate (DRE)
- Department of Alcoholic Beverage Control (ABC AB)
- Alcoholic Beverage Control Appeals Board
- California Horse Racing Board (CHRB)
- California Cannabis Appeals Panel (CCAP)
- California Department of Cannabis Control (DCC)

=== Commissions ===
- California Seismic Safety Commission
