= California Business, Consumer Services and Housing Agency =

California state government agency

Business, Consumer Services and Housing Agency
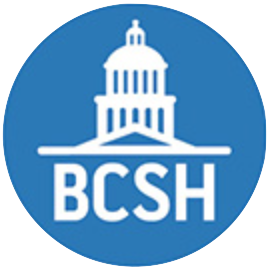

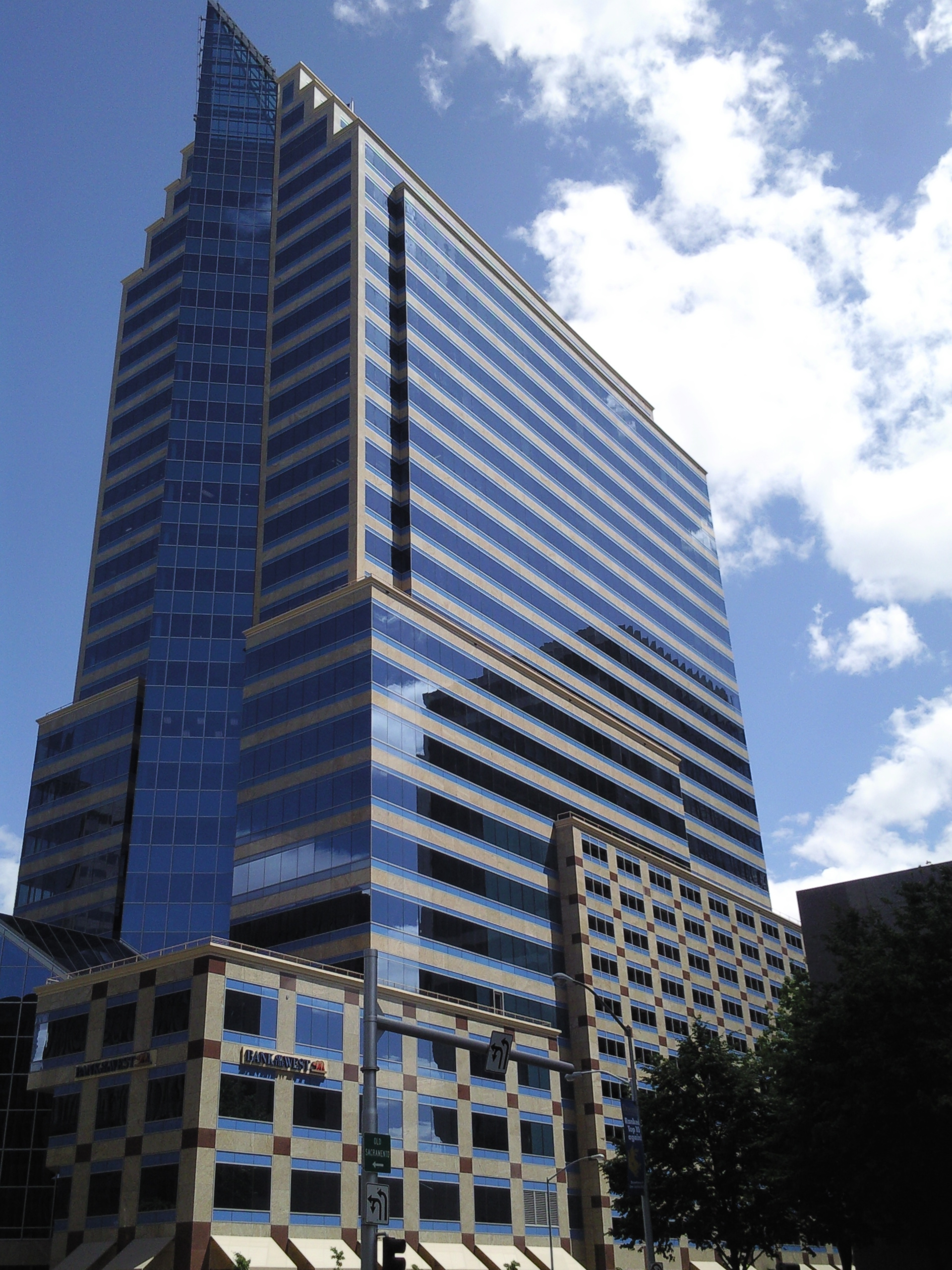
- Agency headquarters at the Bank of the West Tower

Agency overview
- Formed: July 1, 2013
- Preceding agency: State and Consumer Services Agency
- Dissolved: July 1, 2026
- Superseding agencies: California Housing and Homelessness Agency; California Business and Consumer Services Agency
- Jurisdiction: Government of California
- Headquarters: Sacramento, California
- Employees: 7,970
- Annual budget: $5.78 billion (2023)
- Agency executive: Tad Egawa, Acting Secretary
- Website: bcsh.ca.gov

The Business, Consumer Services and Housing Agency (BCSH) was the California government cabinet-level agency that assisted and educated consumers regarding the licensing, regulation, and enforcement of professionals and businesses. The agency was headquartered at the Bank of the West Tower in Sacramento. It was established 2013 and dissolved in 2026, with its functions transferred to the California Housing and Homelessness Agency and the California Business and Consumer Services Agency.

== Organization ==
=== Departments ===
- Civil Rights Department (CRD)
- Department of Consumer Affairs (DCA)
- Department of Housing and Community Development (HCD)
- Department of Financial Protection and Innovation (DFPI)
- Department of Real Estate (DRE)
- Department of Alcoholic Beverage Control (ABC)
- Alcoholic Beverage Control Appeals Board
- California Horse Racing Board (CHRB)

=== Commissions ===
- California Interagency Council on Homelessness (Cal ICH)
- California Seismic Safety Commission

== History ==
The agency was first formed in 2013 under Governor Jerry Brown following the splitting of the California State Transportation Agency from the California Business, Transportation and Housing Agency in the previous year, with several non-transportation-related departments from the California State and Consumer Services Agency being sorted under the new agency.

=== Governor Newsom's 2025 government reorganization plan ===
On April 4, 2025, as part of the reorganization of the BCSH within the budget, Governor Gavin Newsom proposed to the Little Hoover Commission spinning off the California Department of Housing and Community Development, along with the California Interagency Council on Homelessness, California Housing Finance Agency and the Civil Rights Department, into two separate cabinet-level agencies, the California Housing and Homelessness Agency (CHHA) and Business and Consumer Services Agency (BCSA). The Little Hoover Commission organized a two day hearing to communicate thoughts and opinions on the reorganization proposal of the BCSH, determining that Gavin Newsom's agenda should be approved.

=== Legislature timeline ===
Upon presenting the agenda to the Commission, Gavin Newsom must wait at least 30 days before submitting it to the Legislature; the proposed split was submitted on May 5, 2025. Following the submission, both the Legislature and the Commission are given specific timelines. The Commission must present a report evaluating the plan by June 4, 2025 (30 days) and the Legislature has until July 4, 2025 (60 days) to consider the proposition. Considering the Legislature did not take action to veto proposal within the 60 day review period, Gavin Newsom's plan can become effective on the 61st day on July 5, 2025.

The Business, Consumer Services and Housing Agency was dissolved on July 1, 2026.

=== California Housing and Homelessness Agency (CHHA) ===
The California Housing and Homeless agency areas of focus are housing, homelessness, and civil rights functions.

==== Departments of CHHA ====
- Department of Housing and Community Development (HCD)
- California Interagency Council on Homelessness (CalICH)
- California Housing Finance Agency (CalHFA)
- Civil Rights Department (CRD)
- Housing Development and Finance Committee- New (HDFC)

=== Business and Consumer Services Agency (BCSA) ===
The Business and consumer services agency will target their resources to consumer protection and business regulation enforcement.

==== Departments of BCSA ====
- Department of Alcoholic Beverage Control (ABC)
- Alcoholic Beverage Control Appeals Board (ABC AB)
- Department of Cannabis Control (DCC)
- Cannabis Control Appeals Panel (CCAP)
- California Horse Racing Board (CHRB)
- Department of Consumer Affairs (DCA)
- Department of Real Estate (DRE)
- Department of Financial Protection and Innovation (DFPI)

== Leadership ==
- Anna Caballero (2013-2016)
- Alexis Podesta (2017-2020)
- Lourdes M. Castro-Ramírez (2020-2024)
- Tomiquia Moss (2024-2026)
