= List of mayors of Merced, California =

Mayor of Merced
- Incumbent; Matthew Serratto since December 7, 2020
- Term length: Varies historically; four years since 2020
- Formation: April 1, 1889
- First holder: M.D. Wood

This is a list of mayors of Merced, California.

The City of Merced was formed after a petition was filed with the Merced County Board of Supervisors on March 7, 1889. Voters approved incorporation and elected the city's first officials on March 30, 1889, and the Board of Supervisors canvassed and declared the results on April 1, 1889. The Secretary of State approved the incorporation on April 3, 1889, establishing Merced as a sixth-class city.

== Governing body and mayoral selection ==
From when the incorporation of the city until 1928, Merced was governed under a five-member Board of Trustees. The first appointed officer was given the title of "President of the Board of Trustees" who then functioned as mayor, chosen by a vote of the trustees themselves rather than directly elected. On January 3, 1928, the governing body was renamed to the City Council, and its members became Councilmen. The presiding office was also then formally renamed to Mayor.

The City of Merced has operated under this general-law commission form of government until April 12, 1949, when voters approved a Charter form of government. A special election on July 19, 1949, expanded the council from five to its current form of seven members, who took office July 26, 1949. The council had continued to choose the mayor from among its own members after the charter change.

Council (and mayoral) elections were held every two years in April from 1890 through 1979. Beginning with the election of November 3, 1981, the city moved municipal elections to November of odd-numbered years. In 1993, Richard Bernasconi became Merced's first directly elected mayor, ending the long-standing practice of council members selecting the mayor from the city council. The mayoral term, historically renewed every two years, was also extended to three years by charter amendment in 2013 to align city elections with statewide elections, and was extended again to four years beginning with the November 2020 election. Matthew Serratto became the first mayor elected to a four-year term Since 2016, most council seats have been elected by district, though the mayor continues to be elected at large.

== Chronological list ==
Mayors of Merced
	Name	Took office	Left office	Notes
1	M.D. Wood	April 1, 1889	April 21, 1890	First mayor of Merced, chosen by the board of trustees.
2	E.T. Dixon	April 21, 1890	April 19, 1894	
3	W.H. Turner	April 19, 1894	April 20, 1908	Served continuously as a trustee from 1889 to 1908. The city's records describe his mayoral tenure as sixteen years, though the recorded office dates span fourteen years.
4	L. Henderson	April 20, 1908	April 18, 1910	
5	S.C. Cornell	April 18, 1910	January 3, 1911	Resigned from the board of trustees.
6	C.T. Hunter	January 3, 1911	September 19, 1911	Elected by the board after Cornell's resignation; himself resigned as president of the board.
7	L. Henderson	September 19, 1911	April 15, 1912	Second term.
8	E.R. Alvord	April 15, 1912	April 27, 1914	
9	R. Barcroft	April 27, 1914	April 17, 1916	Elected after the council took 43 secret ballots across two meetings.
10	True W. Fowler	April 17, 1916	April 15, 1918	
11	J.B. Olcese	April 15, 1918	April 19, 1920	
12	J.D. Wood	April 19, 1920	April 21, 1924	
13	A.E. Howard	April 21, 1924	April 19, 1926	
14	J.D. Wood	April 19, 1926	April 18, 1932	Second term. Title changed from President of the board of trustees to Mayor on January 3, 1928, without interrupting his tenure.
15	John R. Cornett	July 18, 1932	April 16, 1934	The council could not agree on a mayor after the 1932 election and rotated an acting mayor at each meeting for three months; Cornett was elected after 156 secret ballots.
16	J.C. Cocanour	April 16, 1934	April 20, 1936	
17	L.J.C. Wegner	April 20, 1936	April 18, 1938	
18	Peter P. Myhand	April 18, 1938	July 1, 1939	Resigned after his election to the California State Senate in December 1938.
19	Richard A. Jones	July 1, 1939	April 20, 1942	Elected by the council to complete Myhand's term.
20	Wilbur C. McMurry	April 20, 1942	April 16, 1946	
21	J.E. Fritz	April 16, 1946	April 20, 1948	
22	A. Homer Griffin	April 20, 1948	July 26, 1949	Last mayor before Merced's 1949 charter reorganization.
23	Kenneth E. Morley	July 26, 1949	April 14, 1953	First mayor under the Charter government and the expanded seven-member council.
24	Frank S. Arnold	April 14, 1953	April 12, 1955	
25	Reno Ferrero	April 12, 1955	April 9, 1957	
26	Angelo Bardini	April 9, 1957	April 14, 1959	
27	L. Earle Salter	April 14, 1959	April 11, 1961	
28	Gyle Miller	April 11, 1961	April 9, 1963	
29	Richard W. Zug	April 9, 1963	April 13, 1965	
30	Ralph H. Shannon	April 13, 1965	April 8, 1969	
31	James H. Vaughn	April 8, 1969	April 13, 1971	
32	Edwin M. Dewhirst	April 13, 1971	April 22, 1975	
33	William P. Quigley	April 22, 1975	April 24, 1979	
34	Robert L. Hart	April 24, 1979	May 4, 1981	Resigned.
35	Carol Gabriault	May 4, 1981	November 10, 1981	First woman to serve as mayor of Merced; appointed to complete Hart's term.
36	Norman Herman	November 10, 1981	March 15, 1983	Replaced as mayor by a special vote of the council.
37	Carol Gabriault	March 15, 1983	November 15, 1983	Second term.
38	Samuel C. Pipes	November 15, 1983	November 12, 1985	
39	Marvin Wells	November 12, 1985	November 14, 1989	
40	Bruce Gabriault	November 14, 1989	November 12, 1991	
41	James Lindsey	November 12, 1991	November 9, 1993	
42	Richard Bernasconi	November 9, 1993	November 10, 1997	First directly elected mayor of Merced.
43	Mary Jo Knudsen	November 10, 1997	November 13, 2001	
44	Hubert "Hub" Walsh	November 13, 2001	November 28, 2005	
45	Ellie Wooten	November 28, 2005	November 30, 2009	
46	William Spriggs	November 30, 2009	December 5, 2011	
47	Stanley Thurston	December 5, 2011	December 19, 2016	Term extended from two to three years by charter amendment in 2013, aligning city elections with statewide even-year elections.
48	Mike Murphy	December 19, 2016	December 7, 2020	
49	Matthew Serratto	December 7, 2020	Incumbent	First mayor elected to a four-year term.

== See also ==
- Merced, California
- Merced County, California
- Government of California
