= California Housing and Homelessness Agency =

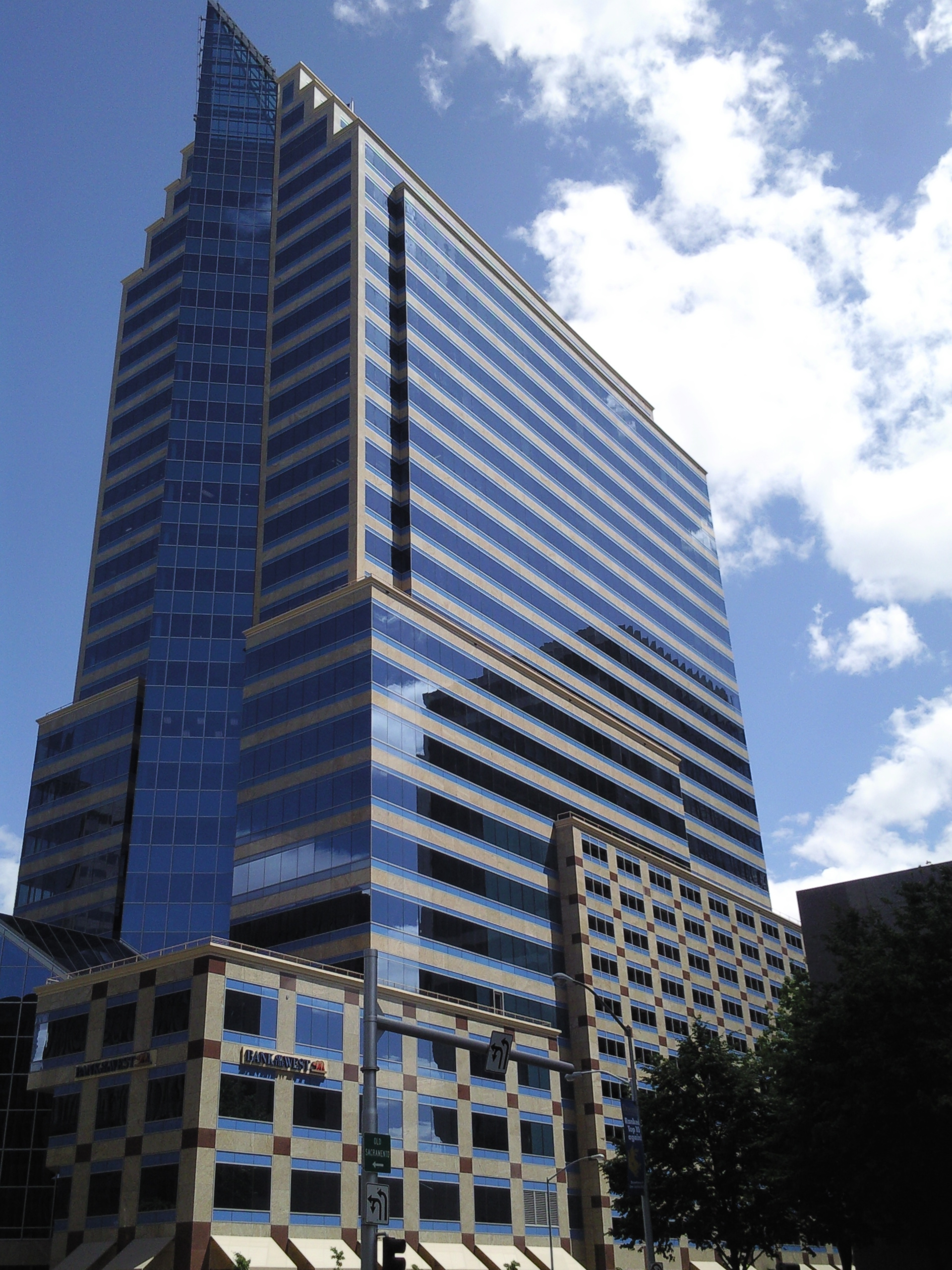
- Agency headquarters at the BMO Tower

Agency overview
- Formed: July 1, 2026
- Preceding agency: Business, Consumer Services and Housing Agency
- Jurisdiction: Government of California
- Headquarters: Sacramento, California
- Agency executive: Tomiquia Moss, Secretary
- Website: housing.ca.gov

The California Housing and Homelessness Agency (CHHA) is a cabinet-level agency of the California state government, tasked with implementing state policies on housing and homelessness. The CHHA became active on July 1, 2026, splitting from the former California Business, Consumer Services and Housing Agency (BCSH).

== Background ==
=== Formation ===
In 2025, Governor Gavin Newsom proposed a reorganization of BCSH as part of the annual budget process. The proposed reorganization involved the creation of two new cabinet-level agencies out of the former BCSH: the California Housing and Homelessness Agency and the Business and Consumer Services Agency (BCSA). The CHHA would consist largely of departments spun off from the former BCSH: the California Department of Housing and Community Development (HCD), the California Interagency Council on Homelessness (Cal ICH), California Housing Finance Agency (CalHFA) and the Civil Rights Department (CRD). As well, the CHHA would include a newly-created Housing Development and Finance Committee (HDFC) to streamline policies on affordable multifamily housing funds.

BCSA was proposed as the new home for the remaining departments of BCSH. The spinoff of the CHHA is motivated in part to the ongoing California housing shortage, as well as the growth of enforcement powers attributed to the HCD since 2017.

Newsom submitted his proposal to the Little Hoover Commission on April 4, 2025. On May 29, the commission favorably recommended the proposal to the Legislature with additional recommendations, including allowing the creation of a “one-stop shop” for state financial assistance to build affordable housing to go into effect immediately.

The commission recommended additional homelessness-related programs being merged into the CHHA from multiple other agencies and departments, including the California Health and Human Services Agency (Department of Social Services, Department of Health Care Services, Department of Community Services and Development), California State Treasurer, Governor's Office of Emergency Services, Department of Veterans Affairs and California Department of Corrections and Rehabilitation. In particular, due to constitutional constraints, the Commission recommended striking a formal deal between the offices of Governor and Treasurer to “create a unified application and review process” for all their respective affordable finance programs.

The proposal was submitted to the 2025 session of the Legislature on May 14, 2025, with the legislature having until July 4 to consider the proposal. Absent legislative rejection by simple majority in either house, the plan took effect on July 5, 2025. Implementation of the plan was set to take effect by July 1, 2026, by which time the BCSH dissolved and both the CHHA and BCSA became active.

The Housing Development and Finance Committee, consisting of BCSHA Secretary Tomiquia Moss, HCD Executive Director Gustavo Velasquez and CalHFA Executive Director Tony Sertich, first met on May 26, 2026. Newsom appointed Jonathan Klein as Executive Director of the HDFC on May 14, 2026.

Tomiquia Moss was sworn in as the inaugural CHHA Secretary on June 30, with Sasha Kergan being sworn in as Undersecretary.

== Leadership ==
=== Secretaries ===
- Tomiquia Moss (2026-present)

=== Undersecretaries ===
- Sasha Kergan (2026-present)

== Organization ==
- California Department of Housing and Community Development (HCD)
  - California Housing Finance Agency (HFA)
  - Disability Advisory Committee (DAC)
- California Interagency Executive Council on Homelessness (proposed)
  - California Interagency Council on Homelessness (Cal ICH)
- Civil Rights Department (CRD)
  - Civil Rights Council
  - Commission on the State of Hate
- Housing Development and Finance Committee (HDFC)

== Reception ==
The Terner Center for Housing Innovation at the University of California, Berkeley assessed the proposal as a potential improvement over the fragmentation and bureaucracy of housing finance in the state government, but viewed the exclusion of two tax credit award agencies (the California Tax Credit Allocation Committee (TCAC) and California Debt Limit Allocation Committee (CDLAC), both under the California State Treasurer's office) from the proposed merger as a potential impediment.

== See also ==
- California Social Housing Act, bill proposing a statewide social housing authority.
- California housing shortage
