= California Department of Real Estate =

California state agency

Department of Real Estate
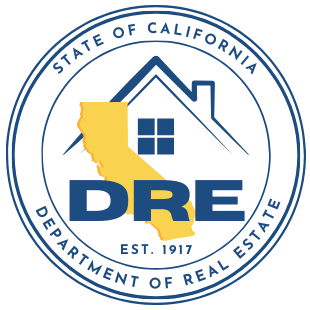

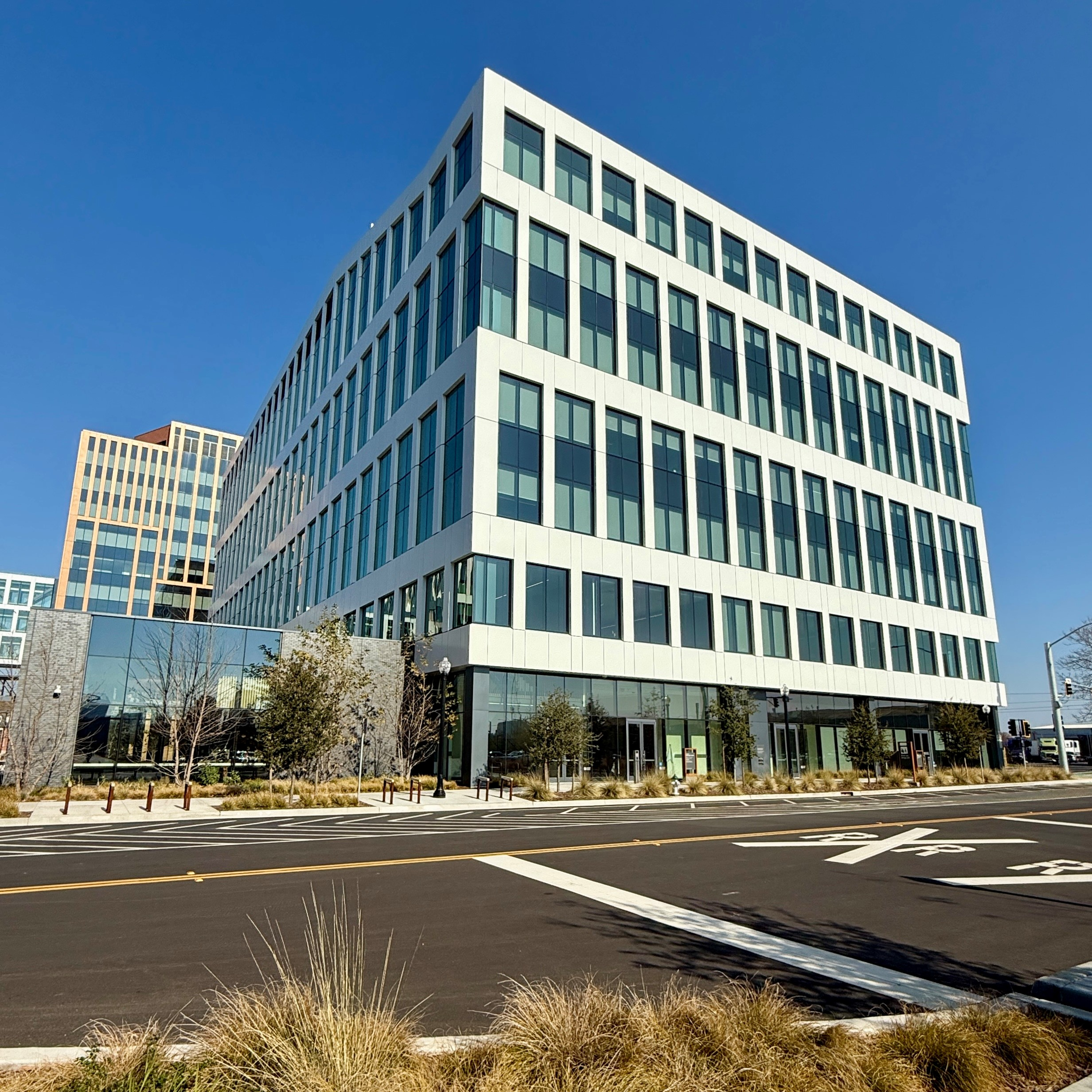
- DRE headquarters in Sacramento's Richards neighborhood

Department overview
- Jurisdiction: Government of California
- Headquarters: 651 Bannon Street, Suite 500, Sacramento, CA 95811
- Department executive: Chika Sunquist, Commissioner
- Parent Department: California Business, Consumer Services, and Housing Agency
- Website: www.dre.ca.gov

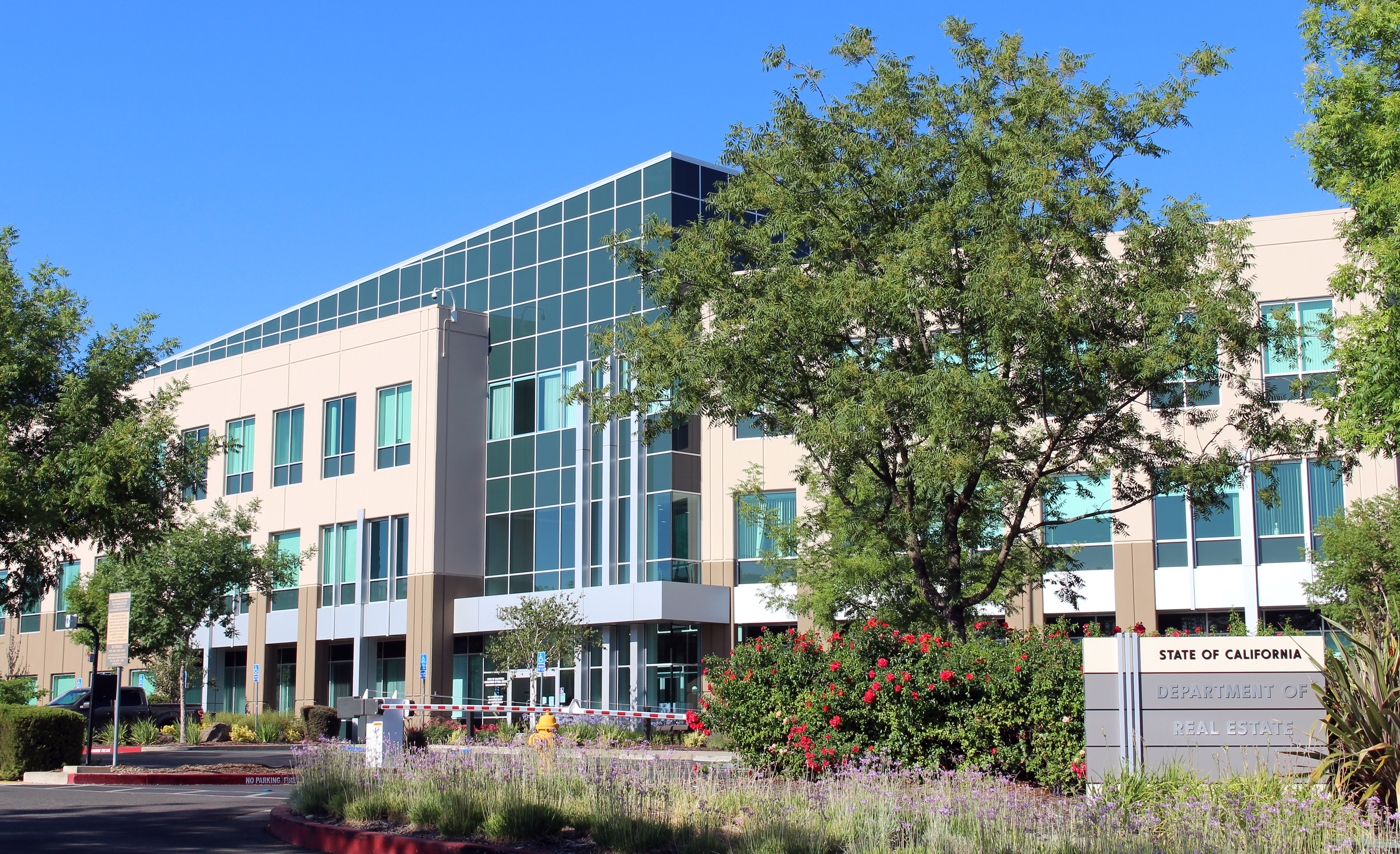
Former headquarters in Sacramento's Point West neighborhood

The California Department of Real Estate (DRE) is a California state agency focused on safeguarding and promoting the public interest in real estate matters through licensure, regulation, education, and enforcement. Employees headquartered in Sacramento and in district offices in Oakland, Fresno, Los Angeles, and San Diego carry out the DRE's responsibilities as mandated by the Real Estate Law. There are 430,554 real estate licensees in California as of December 2024.

== History ==
The DRE was founded in 1917, when the California legislature enacted the nation’s first real estate law. In July 2013, the department briefly merged with the California Department of Consumer Affairs as the Bureau of Real Estate. In January 2018, through Senate Bill 172, it again became an independent department.

== Real Estate Commissioner ==
The Real Estate Commissioner is appointed by the Governor, and serves as the chief executive of the Department of Real Estate.

Chika Sunquist was appointed Commissioner of the California Department of Real Estate (DRE) by Governor Gavin Newsom on November 28, 2023, and she assumed office on January 3, 2024.

Real estate licensing is subject to both the Real Estate Law and the Regulations of the Commissioner, which have the force and effect of law. In enforcing the provisions of the Real Estate Law, the Commissioner has the authority to hold formal hearings involving a licensee or license applicant. The Commissioner also has the authority to issue Desist and Refrain Orders on activities that violate Real Estate Law or the Subdivided Lands Law.

== Program Areas ==
=== Licensing ===
A real estate license must be obtained from the DRE in order to engage in the real estate business and to act in the capacity of a real estate broker or salesperson within the State of California. Before applying for a license, all education and experience requirements mandated by the Department must be fulfilled. Licenses can be renewed by submitting a renewal application, paying a fee, and completing continuing education courses in topics including but not limited to implicit bias, ethics, agency relationships, and fair housing.

=== Enforcement and Audits ===
Investigations are made by the Department's Enforcement program on the basis of written complaints from the public alleging violations of the State Business and Professions Code. Audits are made by the Department’s Audits program on the basis of allegations of trust fund violations. If an inquiry into the matter substantiates a violation, the Department may take formal disciplinary action, which may result in the suspension, restriction, or revocation of a license, and/or filing of an Order to Desist and Refrain. Some violations may result in substantial fines.

=== Consumer Recovery Account ===
The Consumer Recovery Account is a victims’ fund financed by a portion of the fees paid by licensees. When a member of the public obtains a qualifying judgment as a result of fraud or conversion of trust funds by a real estate licensee acting as an agent in the transaction, they may seek reimbursement from the Consumer Recovery Account for actual and direct loss to a statutory maximum.

=== Subdivisions ===
Subdivision laws enforced by the Department help ensure that subdividers deliver to buyers what was agreed to at the time of sale. Before subdivided real property can be marketed in California, subdividers must obtain a public report from the Department disclosing to prospective buyers pertinent information about a particular subdivision.

=== Mortgage Loan Activities ===
The Department monitors certain real estate activities of licensees doing business as mortgage lenders and mortgage brokers. For mortgage loan brokers whose business activity meets the statutory criteria, reports are submitted to the Department to ensure broker compliance with the law.

=== Communications and Publications ===
The Department communicates key real estate information to the public through publications and digital media. Quarterly bulletins and regular advisories are published to alert consumers and licensees about recent changes in the Real Estate Law, DRE policies, and other topics of industry interest. The DRE also offers timely updates on social media platforms such as Facebook, Instagram, LinkedIn, Mastodon, Twitter, and YouTube.

== See also ==
- Standardized Natural Hazards Disclosure Statement (Real estate seller and brokers)
