= California Civil Rights Department =

State government agency in the United States

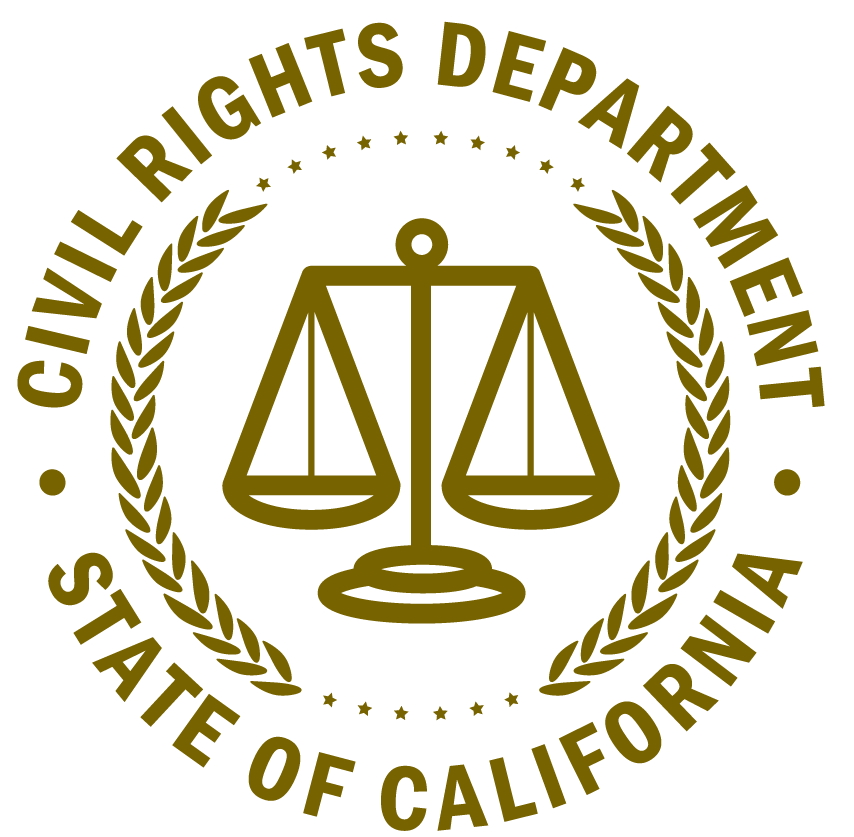

Agency overview
- Formed: 1959
- Type: Civil rights
- Headquarters: 651 Bannon Street, Suite 200; Sacramento, California 95811; 38.595178°N 121.493514°W
- Agency executive: Kevin Kish, Director
- Parent agency: Business, Consumer Services and Housing Agency
- Key documents: CA Fair Employment and Housing Act, Government Code section 12900, et seq.; Unruh Civil Rights Act, Civil Code section 51, et seq.; Ralph Civil Rights Act, Civil Code section 51.7
- Website: calcivilrights.ca.gov

The California Civil Rights Department (CRD), formerly known as the Department of Fair Employment and Housing (DFEH), is an agency of California state government charged with the protection of residents from employment, housing and public accommodation discrimination, and hate violence. It is the largest state civil rights agency in the United States. It also provides representation to the victims of hate crimes. CRD has a director who is appointed by the governor of California and maintains a total of five offices and five educational clinics throughout the state. Today, it is considered part of the California Business, Consumer Services, and Housing Agency. When the California Housing and Homelessness Agency is formed in 2026, the CRD will be transferred to it.

Kevin Kish, a noted civil rights attorney, was appointed by Governor Jerry Brown on December 29, 2014, to be director of California's Department of Fair Employment and Housing (DFEH), the largest state civil rights agency in the nation. The position of Director for the DFEH was made vacant following the abrupt resignation of the former director Phyllis W. Cheng.

== Mission ==
The mission of the Department of Fair Employment and Housing (D.F.E.H), is to protect Californian's from employment, housing and public accommodation discrimination, and hate violence.

The Department enforces California state laws that prohibit harassment, discrimination, retaliation employment, housing, and public accommodations that provide for pregnancy leave, family, and medical. The D.F.E.H also accepts, investigates, mediates and prosecutes complaints alleging hate violence or threats of hate violence.

== History ==
In 1959, California passed its first state-wide protections against workplace discrimination and created the Fair Employment Practices Commission to implement them. In 1980, the Fair Employment and Housing Act (FEHA) was formed, which consolidated both the 1959 Fair Employment Practices Act and the 1963 Rumford Fair Housing Act, and converted the Fair Employment Practices Commission to a department-level agency, the Department of Fair Employment and Housing (DFEH), to enforce that law. In July 2022, DFEH was renamed the Civil Rights Department to more accurately reflect its powers and duties.

== Statutes enforced ==
The CRD enforces the following California civil rights law:

- Fair Employment and Housing Act (FEHA) (Gov. Code, § 12900 et seq.).
- Unruh Civil Rights Act (Civ. Code, § 51 et seq.).
- Ralph Civil Rights Act (Civ. Code, § 51.7).
- Disabled Persons Act (Civ. Code, § 54 et seq.).

The FEHA (Gov. Code, § 12900 et seq.) is one of the leading state civil rights law in the nation. In employment, the FEHA prohibits discrimination and harassment on the basis of age (40 and over), ancestry, color, religious creed (including religious dress and grooming practices), denial of family and medical leave, disability (mental and physical) including HIV and AIDS, gender, gender expression, gender identity, genetic information, marital status, medical condition (cancer and genetic characteristics), national origin, race, sex (including pregnancy, childbirth, breastfeeding, and medical conditions related to pregnancy, childbirth or breastfeeding) and sexual orientation. (Gov. Code, §§ 12926, 12940, 12945, 12945.2.) In addition to the prohibition against pregnancy discrimination afforded under Government Code section 12940, the FEHA also requires employers to provide a reasonable accommodation, transfer, or leave for up to four months to employees disabled by pregnancy, childbirth, or a related medical condition. (Gov. Code, § 12945.2, subd. (a).)

In housing, the Act provides protection from harassment and discrimination because of race, color, religion, sex, gender, gender identity, gender expression, sexual orientation, marital status, national origin, ancestry, familial status, source of income, disability, or genetic information. (Gov. Code, § 12955.)

The FEHA also bars retaliation against any person who has filed a complaint with the department, participated in a department investigation or opposed any activity prohibited by the Act. (Gov. Code, § 12940, subd. (h).)

Under the FEHA, the department's jurisdiction extends to individuals, private or public entities, housing providers, and business establishments within the State of California. The FEHA's prohibitions against employment discrimination apply to employers with five or more employees. (Gov. Code, § 12926, subd. (d).) The prohibition against workplace harassment applies to employers with one or more employees. (Gov. Code, § 12945, subd. (j) (4) (A).)

Within the FEHA, the California Family Rights Acts (CFRA) allows an employee who has worked for at least 12 months, accrued a minimum of 1,250 hours during the preceding 12 months, and is employed at a worksite with 50 or more employees within 75 miles to take up to 12 work-weeks of protected leave. (Gov. Code, § 12945.2, subds. (a) & (b).) An eligible employee may take CFRA leave for his or her own serious health condition; to care for a parent, dependent child, or spouse with a serious health condition; or for care and bonding in connection with the birth, adoption, or placement of a child for foster care. (Gov. Code, § 12945.2, subd. (c).) An employer is required under the CFRA to reinstate the employee to the same or a comparable position upon the termination of the CFRA leave. (Gov. Code, § 12945.2, subd. (a).) Additionally, the CFRA expressly prohibits an employer from refusing to hire, discharging, suspending, or discriminating in any manner against an employee because the employee has requested CFRA leave, or has given information or testimony about his or her own or another employee's CFRA leave. (Gov. Code, § 12945.2, subd. (l).)

Government Code section 12948 incorporates into the FEHA the Unruh Civil Rights Act (Civ. Code, § 51), the Ralph Civil Rights Act (Civ. Code, § 51.7), and the Disabled Persons Act (Civ. Code, § 54 et seq.). The Unruh Civil Rights Act provides that:

All persons within the jurisdiction of this state are free and equal, and no matter what their sex, race, color, religion, ancestry, national origin, disability, medical condition, genetic information, marital status, or sexual orientation are entitled to the full and equal accommodations, advantages, facilities, privileges, or services in all business establishments of every kind whatsoever. (Civ. Code, § 51.)

The Ralph Civil Rights Act prohibits violence or threats of violence because of an individual's actual or perceived of violence sex, race, color, religion, ancestry, national origin, disability, medical condition, genetic information, marital status, sexual orientation or position in a labor dispute. (Civ. Code, § 51.7.) California's Disabled Persons Act entitles all individuals with disabilities full and equal access to all places of public accommodation, amusement, or resort; medical facilities; common carriers, airplanes, motor vehicles, railroad trains, motorbuses, streetcars, boats, or any other public conveyances; private schools, hotels, lodging places, and other places to which the general public is invited. (Civ. Code, § 54.1.)

== FEHA history and development ==
On April 16, 1959, Governor Edmund G. “Pat” Brown, Sr., signed the Fair Employment Practices Act (FEPA), which took effect on September 18, 1959. The FEPA prohibited discrimination in employment on the basis of race, religious creed, color, national origin, and ancestry. The Act's jurisdiction covered employers of 5 or more persons, labor organizations, employment agencies, and any person aiding or abetting the forbidden actions.

In 1963 the Legislature passed the Rumford Fair Housing Act, prohibiting housing discrimination in all rental properties of four or more units on the basis of race, color, religion, national origin and ancestry.

In 1980, Governor Jerry Brown, and the Legislature reorganized civil rights enforcement. The FEPA and the Rumford Fair Housing Act were combined and renamed the Fair Employment and Housing Act (FEHA), to protect Californians from both employment and housing discrimination.

The FEHA predates and provides broader protections than its federal counterparts, Title VII of the 1964 Civil Rights Act and the 1968 Fair Housing Act. Over the years, the FEHA has redressed civil rights violations faced by hundreds of thousands of Californians. Numerous decisions from the trial courts to the United States Supreme Court have affirmed the broad reach of the FEHA. Because of the Act, a vast number of employers and housing providers have changed their business practices to create a more level playing field for all Californians where they live and work.

Under the FEHA, the DFEH receives, investigates, mediates, conciliates, and prosecutes discrimination complaints on behalf of individuals and groups or classes of aggrieved persons. (Gov. Code, § 12930, subd. (f)(1).) The Department adopts, promulgates, amends, and rescinds procedural rules and regulations to carry out its investigation, prosecution, and dispute resolution functions and duties. (Gov. Code, § 12930, subd. (e).) Additionally, the Department investigates, approves, certifies, decertifies, monitors, and enforces state contractors’ compliance with California's nondiscrimination laws. (Gov. Code, § 12930, subd. (j).)

Until December 31, 2012, the Fair Employment and Housing Commission adjudicated FEHA claims and promulgated regulations interpreting substantive rights under the FEHA. The Fair Employment and Housing Council, which replaces the separate Commission, exists within the department, and promulgates regulations interpreting substantive rights under the FEHA.

In recent years, the CRD has involved itself in tech industry affairs at times. In 2021, the agency reportedly began a probe into Google over allegations that the company has unfairly discriminated against Black female workers.

== Senate Bill 1038 ==
Governor Edmund G. "Jerry" Brown, Jr., signed into law Senate Bill 1038 (Committee on Budget & Fiscal Review) (Stats. 2012, ch. 46, §§ 18, 27–66, 68, 70, 101 &115) on June 27, 2012. SB 1038 transformed the role of the CRD and the enforcement of the FEHA. Effective January 1, 2013, among other changes, the bill amends the FEHA to: (1) eliminate the Fair Employment and Housing Commission and replace it with a Fair Employment and Housing Council within the department; (2) transfer the commission's regulatory function to the Department's Council; and (3) end administrative adjudication of FEHA claims.

SB 1038 specifically authorizes the CRD to:

- File cases directly in state or federal court. (Gov. Code, §§ 12930, subd. (h); 12965, subd. (a); 12981, subd. (a).)
- Collect attorney fees and costs when the CRD is the prevailing party in FEHA litigation. (Gov. Code, §§ 112965, subd. (b); 12989.2.)
- Prior to filing a civil action, require all parties to participate in mandatory dispute resolution in the CRD internal Dispute Resolution Division, free of charge to the parties. (Gov. Code, §§ 12965, subd. (a); 12981, subd. (a).)

== Authority ==
The CRD is the State agency responsible for enforcing California's civil rights laws and is the largest state civil rights agency in the nation. CRD has five offices located in Sacramento, Fremont, Fresno, Bakersfield, and Los Angeles. The Sacramento office is designated as "headquarters" and is where the CRD executive team works.

Divisions:

- Enforcement
- Dispute Resolution
- Legal
- Administrative

The CRD also maintains a Special Investigations Unit, Office of Contract Compliance Programs, a Legislative and Regulatory Unit, a Media and Public Affairs Unit and a Public Records Act Request Response Unit.

CRD Clinical Programs:

- DFEH-UC Irvine School of Law Civil Rights Clinic.
- DFEH-UCD Davis School of Law Employment Discrimination Program.
- DFEH-CSU Bakersfield Graduate School Civil Rights Clinic.
- DFEH-College of the Canyons Civil Rights Clinic.
- DFEH-Rio Hondo College Housing Rights Clinic.
- DFEH Civil Rights Graduate Fellowships (Graduate Legal Assistant Program).

CRD Procedural Regulations:

- Effective October 7, 2011.
- Cal. Code Regs., tit. 2, §§ 10000–10066.

The CRD has unilateral discovery rights during the investigative process, which permit the CRD to issue subpoenas (Gov. Code, § 129603.1), serve written interrogatories and requests for production of documents (Gov. Code, §§ 12963.2, 12963.4) and depose witnesses (Gov. Code, § 129603.3).

If an individual or organization fails to comply with a subpoena, interrogatory, request for production, or examination under oath by refusing to respond fully or providing only objections, the CRD may file a petition with a superior court for an order compelling compliance with the discovery, naming the individual or organization that failed to comply as the respondent. (Gov. Code, § 12963.5.) The period of time within which the department may bring a civil action to prosecute a violator is extended by the length of time between the filing of the petition and the filing by the CRD of a certified statement indicating the respondent's compliance with the court's order compelling a response. (Gov. Code, §12963.5, subd. (f).)

In the case of failure to eliminate an unlawful practice through conference, conciliation, mediation, or persuasion, the CRD may bring a civil action in the name of the department on behalf of the person claiming to be aggrieved. (Gov. Code, §§ 12965, subd. (a); 12981, subd. (a).) Prior to filing a civil action, the department must require all parties to participate in mandatory dispute resolution in the CRD's internal Dispute Resolution Division, free of charge to the parties, in an effort to resolve the dispute without litigation. (Id.) Dispute resolution is mandatory for all cause cases for which the CRD will file a civil action. Mandatory dispute resolution is conducted behind a firewall by the CRD's attorney mediators.

In civil actions alleging employment or housing discrimination, the court, in its discretion, may award to the prevailing party, including the CRD, reasonable attorney's fees and costs, including expert witness fees. (Gov. Code, §§ 12965, subd. (b); 12989.2.)

=== Right to sue ===
In order to file a discrimination lawsuit in the state of California, a right to sue notice must be obtained from the agency. The lawsuit must be filed in a state court within one year from receipt of the notice. Right to sue notices are issued when the CRD does not investigate the complaint.

Any person claiming to be aggrieved by an alleged unlawful employment, public accommodation, or housing practice may file a verified complaint for investigation with the CRD. (Gov. Code, §§ 12960, 12963, 12980.) Filing an administrative complaint with the CRD within one year of an alleged unlawful practice (Gov. Code, § 12960, subd. (d)), and receipt of a right-to-sue (Gov. Code, § 12965, subd. (b)), are prerequisites to filing a private action for employment discrimination under the FEHA.

== Notable cases ==
=== Department of Fair Employment and Housing v. Law School Admission Council, Inc. ===
In this case, the CRD (then known as the DFEH) filed suit to halt ongoing harm to individuals with disabilities who sought to enter the legal profession. DFEH alleged that the Law School Admission Council (LSAC) which administers the Law School Admission Test (LSAT) subjected test takers who seek accommodations to onerous documentation requirements, denied requests for reasonable accommodations, and provided different and less desirable score reports to test takers who received the accommodation of additional test time.

The complaint arose from a two-year government investigation by DFEH which began in January 2010. Early in the investigation, Phyllis W. Cheng, DFEH Director, personally issued a Director's complaint alleging that LSAC denied reasonable accommodations to prospective test takers with disabilities. After the Director's complaint, the DFEH filed suit and then litigated the case in federal court in San Francisco. The United States Department of Justice intervened in the suit which expanded the scope of the case and allowed for nationwide recovery.

The largest and only national DFEH case to date, the case was resolved by a settlement agreement (Consent Decree) which included an $8.73 million payment, of which $6.73 million were equally distributed to individuals nationwide who applied for testing accommodations on the LSAT from January 1, 2009, through May 20, 2014. The settlement was the product of a successful collaboration between state and federal agencies and the private bar and was submitted to the court for approval on May 20, 2014.

On May 29, 2014, United States District Court Judge Edward M. Chen entered a Permanent Injunction forever banning LSAC from annotating or "flagging" the LSAT scores of test takers who took the examination with the accommodation of additional test time. In the past, LSAC had reported the scores of those test takers and identified that the test taker was an individual with a disability, that the test had been taken under non standard conditions and that the test scores had to be viewed with great sensitivity. In addition the Judge today gave court approval to the 61-page Consent Decree with extensive provisions and revisions to LSAC's practices regarding testing accommodations and which provides for $8.73 million in monetary relief.

=== Department of Fair Employment and Housing v. Verizon Services Corp. ===
On January 19, 2012, Los Angeles Superior Court Judge Anthony J. Mohr approved a $6,011,190 settlement in Dept. Fair Empl. & Hous. v. Verizon (Seales) (Super. Ct. L.A. County, 2010, No. BC444066) for more than 1,000 current and former California employees to settle a class action lawsuit the DFEH filed challenging the company's family medical leave practices. The settlement covers Verizon's voice, data and video operations in California, which employ more than 7,000 people. The class action lawsuit was precipitated by a more than two-year-long investigation into Verizon's practices under the California Family Rights Act (CFRA), which was conducted by the Department of Fair Employment and Housing's (DFEH) Special Investigations Unit (SIU). The lawsuit alleges that from 2007 to 2010, Verizon denied or failed to timely approve class members' requests for leave for their own serious health condition, to care for a family member with a serious health condition, or to bond with a new child. Settlement of the lawsuit was the second largest in DFEH history. Verizon also agreed to review and revise its leave policies and procedures, continue an existing internal review process that employees can invoke to appeal denials, train all California officers, managers, supervisors and human resources personnel on the procedures and submit regular updates to the DFEH regarding the company's compliance. In settling the matter, Verizon did not admit to liability. In addition to the CFRA class action, the department also settled two companion group actions with Verizon: 1) a $444,960 Fair Employment and Housing Act (FEHA) pregnancy discrimination group settlement for 42 employees denied time off for pregnancy-related medical reasons; and 2) a $467,466 FEHA disability discrimination group settlement for eight employees denied reasonable accommodation. Together, the DFEH achieved a total of $6,923,616 plus affirmative relief in the three Verizon settlements.

=== Farmworkers sexual discrimination case ===
In 2016, the Department of Fair Employment and Housing (DFEH) settled a sex discrimination and retaliation complaint filed by eight farm workers against a Napa Valley vineyard owner, a vineyard management company with a policy of not hiring women, and a Fresno-based farm labor contractor who refused to provide separate toilet facilities for men and women. The complaint, filed by two female laborers and their male co-workers who supported them, settled for $65,000 and significant changes in the companies' future business practices related to hiring of women, training and providing adequate toilet facilities. The workers allege that they were fired from their work on a 38-acre vineyard owned by Alsace Co. LP in June, 2013 after repeatedly requesting a second bathroom as required by law for their crew, which included both men and women. "When farmworkers in California's multibillion dollar agricultural industry labor in unlawful conditions, it is of extreme concern to the Department, which is charged with protecting the people of California from employment, housing and public accommodations discrimination," said Kevin Kish, DFEH Director. "Many farmworkers who lack formal education and English-language skills are unaware of their rights under the law and are reluctant to demand better working conditions, fearing that their demands will lead to their firing," said Kish. "This is what happened in this case. We are gratified that this group of farmworkers came forward and we were able to negotiate a just resolution." According to the workers, there was only one portable toilet at the workplace for two work crews, which included men and women. California law requires at least two separate toilet facilities when both men and women are working together in agricultural operations. Alsace vineyard manager, Jeff Roberts of Farm West LLC, acknowledged that he was unhappy when women showed up in the crew, as he had a policy to hire only men in the vineyards he manages. Workers stated that their foreman told them that Roberts demanded that either the men or the women leave. When the women refused to leave and again complained about the restrooms, they were fired. The farm labor contractor, DJRAS Corp., doing business as Prime Harvest Contracting, admitted that the workers’ supervisor received no training in anti-discrimination and retaliation laws. Even more important than the monetary settlement in this case is the "affirmative relief" which calls for significant changes in business practices, Kish said. As part of the settlement, Farm West, LLC, the vineyard management company, has agreed to change its policy to allow the hiring of women, will regularly report to DFEH on all company hires during the next three (3) years, and will receive training on anti-discrimination laws. Prime Harvest Contracting has agreed to train its staff and ensure that its crews have adequate restroom facilities at all work locations. The vineyard owner, Alsace Co. LP, has agreed to ensure that women are not discriminated against in hiring and employment in its vineyards, and that adequate toilet facilities are provided. The parties settled the farmworkers' claims at a mediation conducted by the Department of Fair Employment and Housing, after the agency determined that laws it enforces were violated.

=== DFEH v. The Irvine Company, LLC, and Irvine Apartment Communities, L.P. ===
On December 17, 2015, the California Department of Fair Employment and Housing (DFEH) announced it had reached a $175,000 settlement with the Irvine Company, LLC and Irvine Apartment Communities, LP, in two lawsuits filed by the department over the companies' alleged discrimination against people with mental health disabilities. The settlement also includes four additional administrative complaints filed with DFEH. The lawsuits filed in Orange County Superior Court on behalf of two residents, and the administrative complaints filed on behalf of six additional residents, alleged the companies failed to accommodate tenants with mental health disabilities by taking steps to discourage tenants from keeping emotional support animals as a reasonable accommodation for their disabilities. The companies charged pet deposits and pet rent, imposed breed and size restrictions for legitimate support animals, and failed to engage in an interactive process to verify that tenants had genuine disabilities. The firms also lacked a uniform reasonable accommodation policy and failed to train their leasing professionals at their apartment communities about fair housing responsibilities toward people with disabilities. As a result, some tenants were evicted from their apartments or had their lease offers revoked. Others were forced to pay additional rent. In addition to paying compensation to plaintiffs and reimbursing DFEH for attorneys' fees, the companies have also agreed to adopt a comprehensive reasonable accommodation policy, provide training to employees, and hire a Compliance Manager to review requests for reasonable accommodation. "We are pleased that The Irvine Co. cooperated with us to achieve this settlement, which compensates the plaintiffs and complainants for the harm they suffered and contains equitable relief designed to ensure that all tenants and applicants with disabilities will receive equal housing opportunities, including reasonable accommodations, as required by law," said Kevin Kish, Director of DFEH. The Settlement Agreement also clarifies the right of the companies to request reliable third-party verification to show the need for a service animal. It also clarifies that ID cards, certificates for a "registered service animal" or online services providing "ESA prescription" letters for sale are not sufficient verification.

=== DFEH v. Sandhu Brothers Poultry and Farming et al. ===
On January 25, 2016, the California Department of Fair Employment and Housing (DFEH) announced it had obtained a $75,000 settlement in a sexual harassment case filed on behalf of a female farmworker who worked for Sandhu Brothers, a sweet potato farming operation in Stanislaus County. The case stemmed from a complaint by a female farmworker that she was harassed by a supervisor while working for Sandhu Brothers. The complaint alleged that the supervisor exposed his genitals to members of the crew, masturbated in front of the workers while driving a tractor, and made unwanted sexual advances to several female crew members. The complainant also alleged that she was groped by the supervisor and was fired after complaining to the company. A separate sexual harassment complaint by another worker involving the same company and the same supervisor was filed and resolved with the federal Equal Employment Opportunity Commission in 2013. After the allegations were investigated and substantiated by the DFEH, a complaint was filed in Stanislaus Superior Court in Modesto, California. The case was settled January 19, 2016. It would have gone to trial on February 2, 2016. As part of the settlement, the company has agreed to undergo sexual harassment training and implement sexual harassment prevention policies. "Sexual harassment is a serious problem, especially in agriculture where many workers are often afraid to speak out and are unaware of their rights," said DFEH Director Kevin Kish. "We hope that this settlement will send a message to victims that the law will not tolerate this kind of behavior in the workplace and encourage employers to adopt effective training and prevention programs." The lawsuit was filed against defendants Sandhu Brothers Growers dba Yam Gro, Gurinder Sandhu, and Bhupinder Sandhu. The case is titled DFEH v. Sandhu Brothers Poultry and Farming et al., Stanislaus County Superior Court Case Number 2006626.

== See also ==
- Civil rights
- Equal Employment Opportunity Commission
