= Tomiquia Moss =

Secretary of the California Business, Consumer Services and Housing Agency

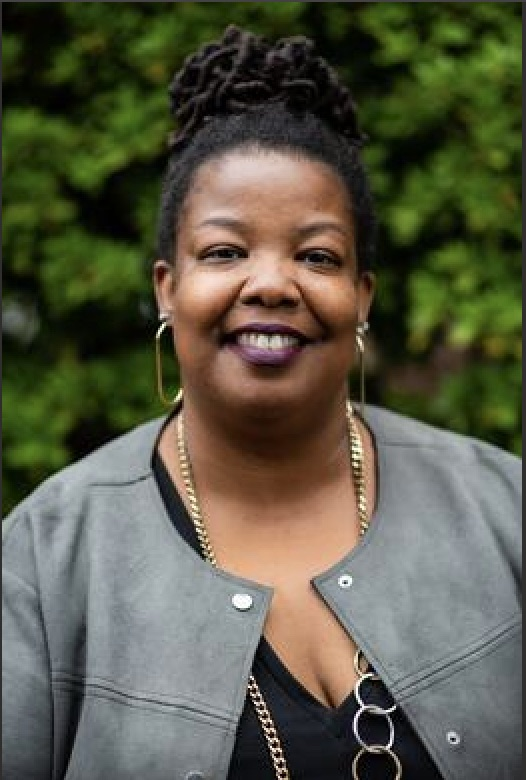

Secretary of the California Housing and Homelessness Agency
- Incumbent
- Assumed office July 1, 2026
- Governor: Gavin Newsom
- Preceded by: position established

Secretary of the California Business, Consumer Services and Housing Agency
- In office February 13, 2024 – July 1, 2026
- Governor: Gavin Newsom
- Preceded by: Lourdes M. Castro-Ramírez
- Succeeded by: agency dissolved

Personal details
- Education: Golden Gate University; Ohio Wesleyan University

Tomiquia Moss is an American public official who has served as Secretary of the California Housing and Homelessness Agency (CHHA) since 2026. She previously was Secretary of the former California Business, Consumer Services and Housing Agency (BCSH) from 2024 to 2026 prior to its dissolution. She was appointed as BCSH Secretary by Governor Gavin Newsom in November 2023 and sworn into office on February 13, 2024, and was subsequently sworn in by Newsom as Secretary of the CHHA on July 1, 2026. Her leadership responsibilities include statewide housing policy, homelessness response, and civil rights enforcement, and previously consumer protection and professional licensing.

== Early life and education ==
Moss earned a Master of Public Administration degree from Golden Gate University and a bachelor's degree in political science from Ohio Wesleyan University.

== Career ==
Prior to her current appointment, Moss worked for more than two decades in nonprofit and public sector leadership focused on housing stability, homelessness, and community development. She founded and was chief executive officer of All Home, a regional nonprofit organization advancing strategies to end homelessness and increase housing security. Moss stepped down from that role following her appointment to BCSH.

Moss previously was chief executive officer of Hamilton Families, a nonprofit providing housing services for families experiencing homelessness. She also held senior municipal government roles, including chief of staff to the Mayor of Oakland and executive director of the HOPE SF Initiative in the San Francisco Mayor's Office.

== Administrative career ==
Moss assumed office as Secretary of BCSH in February 2024. The agency oversaw 12 departments and more than 40 boards and bureaus responsible for housing development, homelessness prevention programs, consumer protection, professional licensing, and civil rights enforcement in California. Upon the BCSH's dissolution, Moss assumed office as Secretary of the CHHA in July 2026, with the new agency overseeing two departments and six boards and commissions focused on housing development, homelessness prevention programs and civil rights enforcement in California.

=== Policy and priorities ===
As Secretary of BCSH and CHHA, Moss has articulated policy priorities focused on expanding affordable housing, strengthening homelessness prevention and response systems, and improving oversight of consumer protection and professional licensing programs. In an interview with KQED, Moss discussed strategies to reduce homelessness, emphasizing housing supply, coordination across state and local governments, and supportive services for people experiencing housing instability.

In addition to housing and homelessness policy, Moss oversaw statewide consumer services, including professional licensing boards and consumer protection entities within BCSH. She has highlighted the agency's role in ensuring accountability, public safety, and equitable access to services regulated by the state.

Moss has also addressed state investment in affordable housing at the regional level, including visits to local projects supported by state funding. During a visit to San Bernardino County, she discussed state commitments to affordable housing development and partnerships with local governments to increase housing supply.

=== Public appearances ===
Moss regularly represents the Newsom administration at public events, site visits, and community forums related to housing, homelessness, and consumer services policy. In this capacity, she frequently is a surrogate for Governor Gavin Newsom, delivering remarks and engaging with local officials, nonprofit leaders, and community stakeholders on behalf of the administration.

In 2025, Moss toured affordable housing developments in San Bernardino County, meeting with local leaders to discuss state-supported housing initiatives and investments aimed at increasing housing availability and affordability in the region.

Moss has also participated in regional site visits and discussions focused on housing innovation in rural and mountain communities. During a visit to the Tahoe–Truckee region, she met with local organizations to explore forest-to-housing initiatives and scalable solutions to address housing challenges in high-cost and disaster-prone areas.

Moss has also appeared in recorded public interviews and briefings discussing statewide housing and homelessness priorities following her appointment as secretary.

== Personal life ==
Moss resides in Oakland, California.
