= California Department of Cannabis Control =

California state government agency

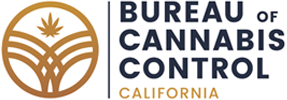

Agency overview
- Formed: 2015 as Bureau of Cannabis Control
- Jurisdiction: California
- Minister responsible: Alexis Podesta, California Business, Consumer Services and Housing Agency
- Agency executive: Nicole Elliott, Director
- Parent department: California Business, Consumer Services and Housing Agency
- Website: cannabis.ca.gov

The Department of Cannabis Control (formerly the Bureau of Cannabis Control, originally established as Bureau of Marijuana Control under Proposition 64, formerly the Bureau of Medical Marijuana Regulation) is an agency of the State of California within the Department of Consumer Affairs, charged with regulating medical cannabis (MMJ) in accordance with state law pursuant to the Medical Cannabis Regulation and Safety Act passed by the legislature in 2015 (amended in 2016) and the Adult Use of Marijuana Act (Proposition 64), passed by voter initiative in November 2016. The agency was charged with creating rules for the legal non-medical market to take effect January 1, 2018; and to regulate the state's multibillion dollar medical program (Note: Medical marijuana sales in California were reported by The New York Times to be over $2.5 billion in 2015) for the first time. The first agency leader, Lori Ajax, referred to in multiple media outlets as the state's cannabis "czar", was appointed by the governor in February 2017. State senator Mike McGuire has expressed doubt that the board would meet deadlines to allow regulated retail sales by 2018 as planned.

== History ==
=== Bureau of Cannabis Control ===
When the agency published emergency rules on November 16, 2017 under California Code of Regulations, Title 16, Division 42, it effectively became the Bureau of Cannabis Control.

=== Department of Cannabis Control ===
In July 2021, following the signing of California Assembly Bill 141, California Business, Consumer Services and Housing Agency's Bureau of Cannabis Control, California Department of Food and Agriculture's CalCannabis Cultivation Licensing Division, and California Department of Public Health's Manufactured Cannabis Safety Branch were consolidated into the Department of Cannabis Control.

=== UCETF ===
Created in 2022, the Unified Cannabis Enforcement Taskforce (UCETF), staffed by local, state and federal partners, is jointly run by the Department of Cannabis Control and the California Department of Fish and Wildlife, with coordination run by the Homeland Security Division of Cal OES, to disrupt the illegal cannabis market.

=== Allegations of fraudulent testing ===
In June 2024, the Los Angeles Times tested legally-sold cannabis products in California and uncovered large amounts of pesticides in many cannabis products. Twenty-five of 42 products contained pesticides exceeding the levels permitted by law. The investigation alleges that many testing laboratories fraudulently certified products as satisfying pesticide regulations, when in fact they did not meet the regulations. Owners of some private testing laboratories stated that they were forced out of business because they refused to falsify test results. The Department of Cannabis Control, which is responsible for regulating cannabis in California, refused to release the results of its own internal testing of cannabis products.

In September 2024, a whistleblower lawsuit was filed by a former employee of the Department of Cannabis Control, alleging that the director of the Department, Nicole Elliott, had ignored fraudulent testing, and that the Department fired the former employee when the employee attempted to publicize the fraud.

The same lawsuit also alleges that the potency displayed on the labels of many legal cannabis products in California are deliberately inflated by fraudulent testing laboratories.
