= Standardized Natural Hazards Disclosure Statement =

The Natural Hazards Disclosure Act, under Sec. 1103 of the California Civil Code, states that real estate seller and brokers are legally required to disclose if the property being sold lies within one or more state or locally mapped hazard areas. The law specifies that the six (6) required hazards be disclosed on a statutory form called the Natural Hazard Disclosure Statement (NHDS).

Required Risks Include:

1. A Special Flood Hazard Area
2. Dam Inundation
3. Very High Fire
4. Wildland fire
5. Earthquake Fault Zone
6. A Seismic hazard

The following supplemental hazards are commonly reported as well:

a. Radon Gas exposure
b. Airport influence area
c. Megan’s Law disclosures
d. Military ordnance

The state of California has a standardized reporting format for the seller and their agent to comply with the law, as it is their responsibility to disclose. The seller and their agent are allowed to seek out a 'third party' (disclosure company, licensed engineer, land surveyor, geologist, or expert in natural hazard discovery) to prepare this report for them. Seller, as transferor, Seller's Agent(s), and Buyer, as transferee are to sign one copy of the Natural Hazard Disclosure Report prior to the close of escrow.

It is illegal for agents to require the seller to use a particular natural hazard disclosure company or to give the impression that the seller may not choose. If the report from a disclosure company is selected and that company is related or affiliated with the agent or broker, disclosure of this relationship must be made to the seller. Once the disclosure is made the seller may continue with that report or choose a report from another disclosure company. California law protects the seller's right to freely choose, for the sake of quality, service and cost.

Real estate agents and broker are forbidden to receive monetary compensation (referral fees, 'kick-backs') or excessive gifts from vendors or affiliates, including but not limited to disclosure companies.
