= California Housing Finance Agency =

Independent California state agency

- CalHFA logo

Agency overview
- Formed: 1975
- Jurisdiction: California
- Headquarters: 500 Capitol Mall, Suite 1400 Sacramento, California 95814
- Agency executives: Jim Cervantes, Chairperson; Anthony Sertich, Executive Director
- Parent agency: California Business, Consumer Services and Housing Agency
- Key document: Zenovich–Moscone–Chacon Housing and Home Finance Act of 1975
- Website: www.calhfa.ca.gov

The California Housing Finance Agency (CalHFA), established in 1975, is an independent California state agency within the California Department of Housing and Community Development that makes low-rate housing loans through the sale of taxable and tax exempt bonds.

== History ==
CalHFA was created by the Zenovich–Moscone–Chacon Housing and Home Finance Act of 1975, which also permanently established and reorganized the California Department of Housing and Community Development.

CalHFA was known as CHFA until 2002 when it was rebranded.

CalHFA provides housing assistance in two main areas: below-market interest rate mortgages and down payment assistance for low and moderate income, first-time homebuyers, many of whom are ethnic minorities not well-served by market rate products and loans for the development and preservation of affordable multifamily rental housing. Though CalHFA is a state agency, it is self-supported meaning that it does not use any general fund allocations for its operations. CalHFA no longer issues mortgage insurance.

CalHFA also administers programs using funds allocated to it by the Federal Government, State Legislature and other sources. These programs have included Keep Your Home California, the National Mortgage Settlement Housing Counseling Program, the California Mortgage Relief Program and others.

== Structure ==
The Single Family Lending Division provides low interest rate home financing to low to moderate income homebuyers in California, as well as down payment and closing cost assistance.

The Multifamily Lending Division provides Conduit Bond Issuance and permanent financing for the acquisition, rehabilitation, and preservation or new construction of affordable rental housing that includes rents restricted to low-income families and individuals. This Division also provides an Asset Management function for agency-financed multifamily rental developments, where each project is monitored regarding its financial, physical and occupancy compliance with various regulations in California.

CalHFA’s Mixed-Income Program provides long-term subordinate financing for new construction of affordable multifamily developments that provide housing for Californians earning between 30% and 120% of the Area Median Income.

== Programs ==
The CalPLUS loan programs feature a CalHFA fixed interest rate first mortgage, insured either through FHA or on the conventional market. This loan is fully amortized for a 30-year term and is combined with the CalHFA Zero Interest Program (ZIP) for closing cost assistance. All borrowers must complete a six-hour homebuyer education course as part of qualifying for the loan.

The MyHome Assistance Program provides down payment and closing cost assistance through a deferred payment junior loan that does not have to be repaid until the first mortgage is refinanced or paid off, or the house is sold.

== Operations ==
CalHFA is a statutorily independent agency and component unit of state government and is not subject to Budget Act appropriation. For reporting purposes, budget information for CalHFA is displayed within the budget of the Department of Housing and Community Development.

== See also ==
- Federal Housing Administration
