= Government of California =

Government of the U.S. state of California

- Logo of the Californian government Great Seal of the State of California
- Polity type: Federated presidential republic
- Constitution: Constitution of California

Legislative branch
- Name: Legislature
- Type: Bicameral
- Meeting place: California State Capitol
- Upper house
- Name: Senate
- Presiding officer: Eleni Kounalakis, President
- Lower house
- Name: Assembly
- Presiding officer: Robert A. Rivas, Speaker

Executive branch
- Head of state and government
- Title: Governor
- Currently: Gavin Newsom
- Appointer: Election
- Cabinet
- Name: Cabinet of California
- Leader: Governor
- Deputy leader: Lieutenant Governor
- Headquarters: California State Capitol

Judicial branch
- Name: Judiciary of California
- Courts: Courts of California
- Supreme Court of California
- Chief judge: Patricia Guerrero
- Seat: Earl Warren Building, San Francisco

The government of California is the governmental structure of the U.S. state of California as established by the California Constitution. California uses the separation of powers system to structure its government. It is composed of three branches: the executive, consisting of the governor of California and the other constitutionally elected and appointed officers and offices; the legislative, consisting of the California State Legislature, which includes the Assembly and the Senate; and the judicial, consisting of the Supreme Court of California and lower courts. There is also local government, consisting of counties, cities, special districts, and school districts, as well as government entities and offices that operate independently on a constitutional, statutory, or common law basis. The state also allows direct participation of the electorate by initiative, referendum, recall and ratification.

== Executive branch ==
California's elected executive officers are:

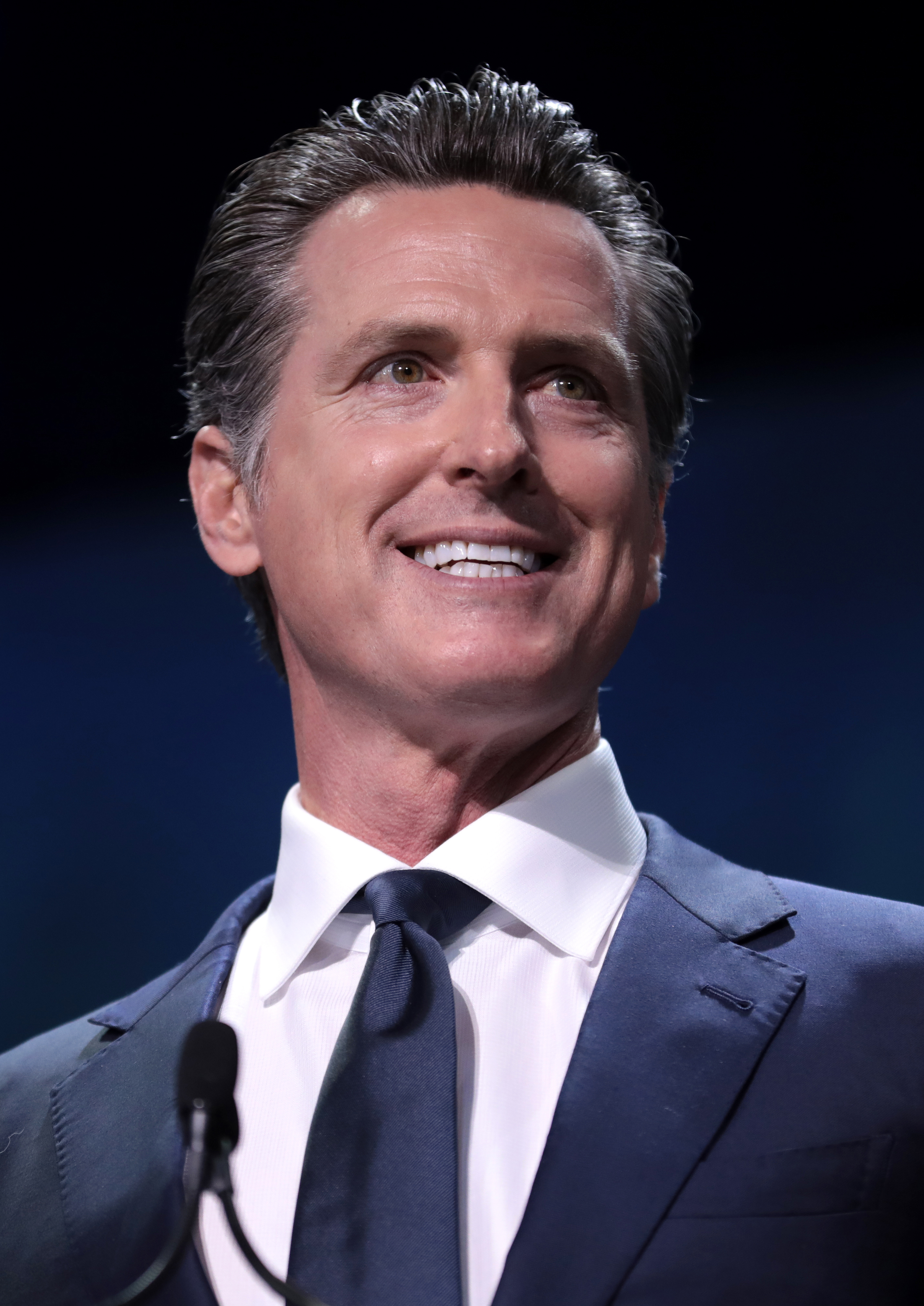
Gavin Newsom (D)
Governor

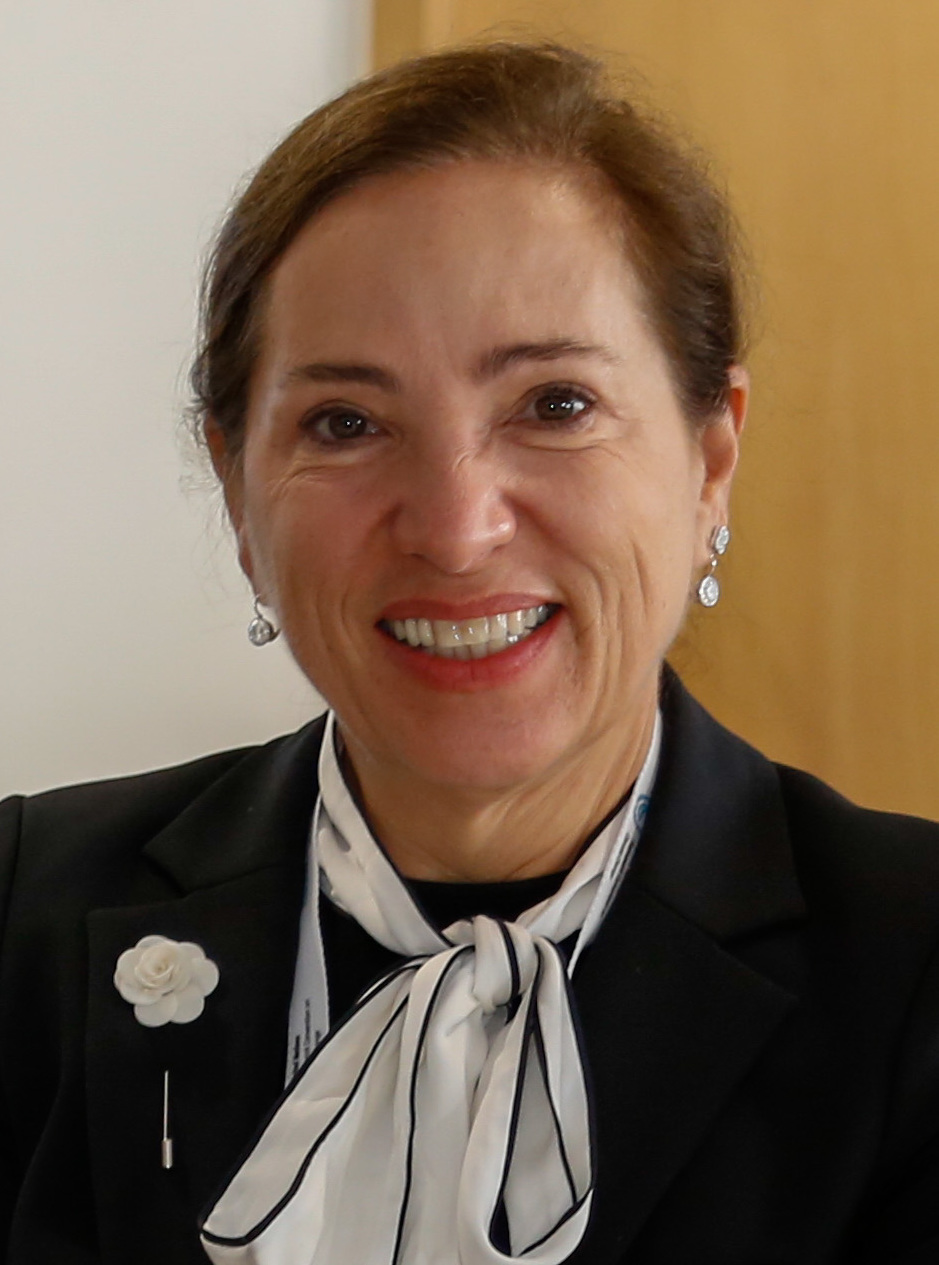
Eleni Kounalakis (D)
Lieutenant Governor

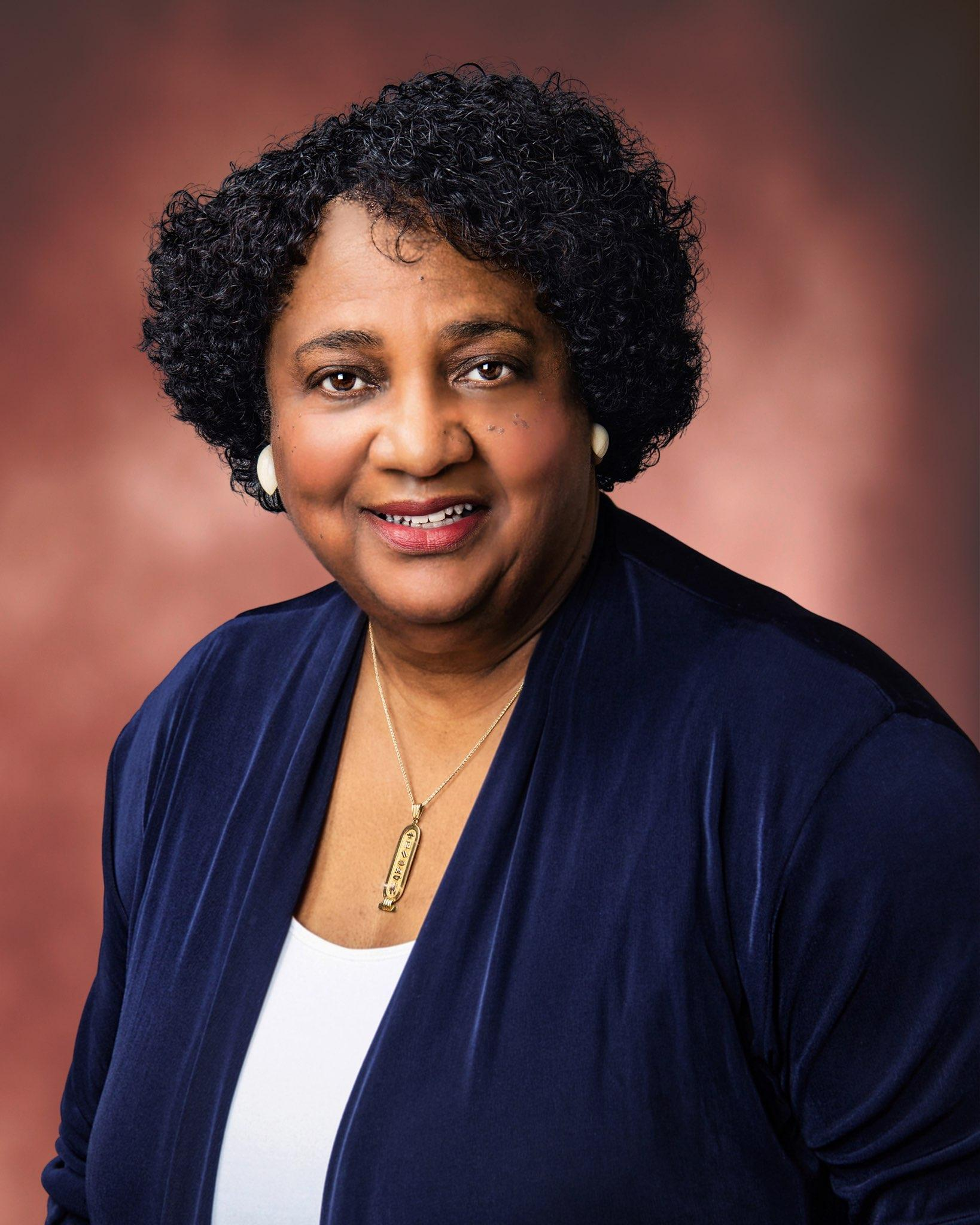
Shirley Weber (D)
Secretary of State

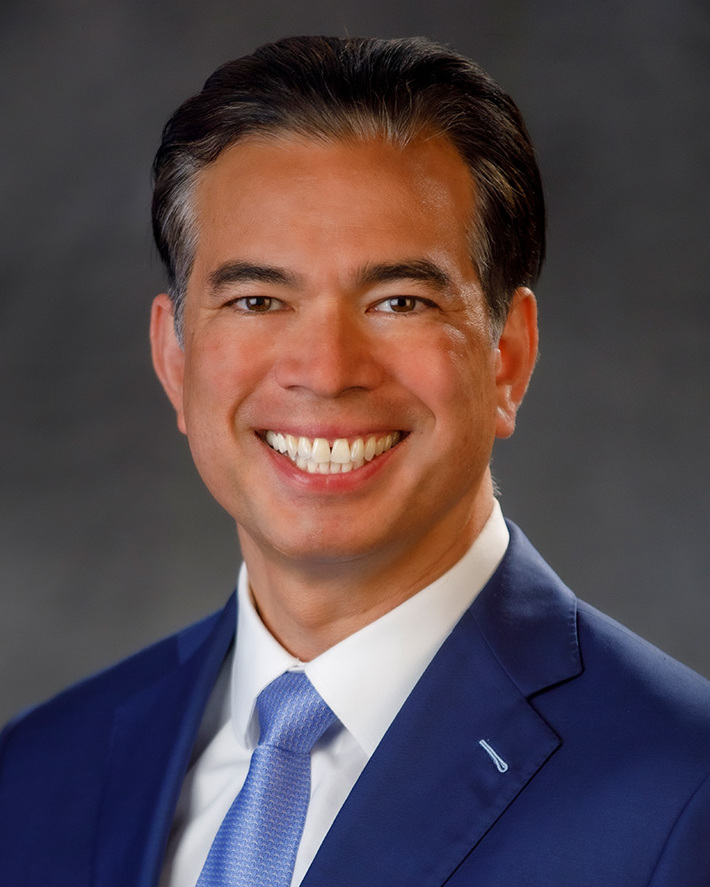
Rob Bonta (D)
Attorney General

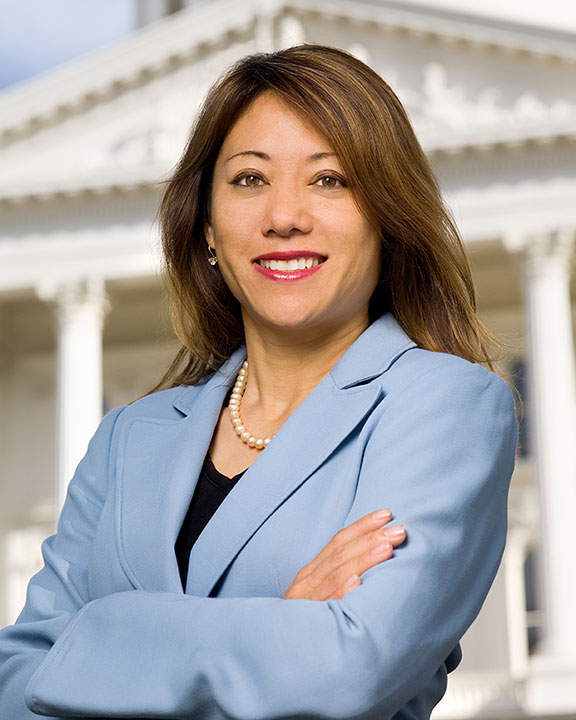
Fiona Ma (D)
State Treasurer

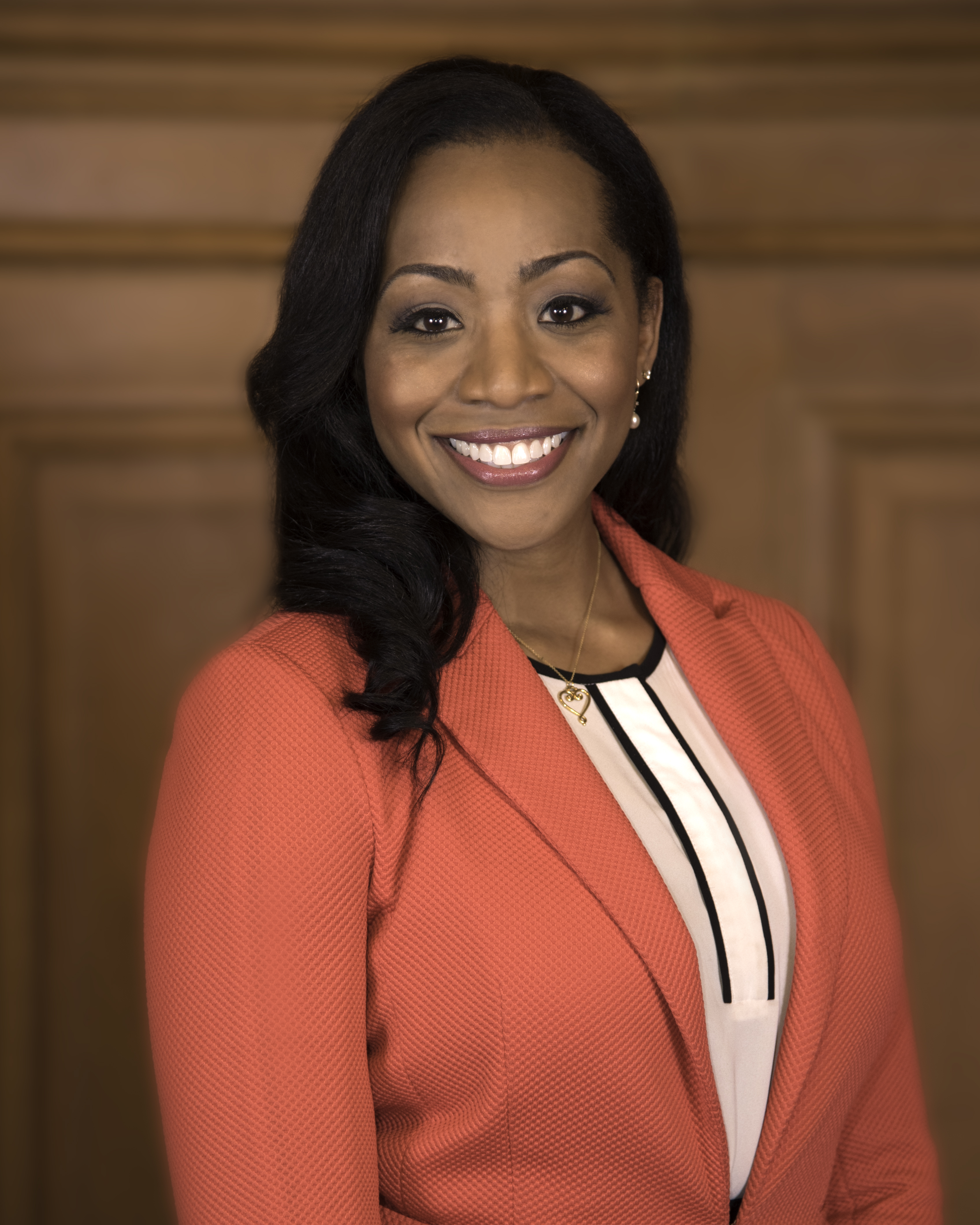
Malia Cohen (D)
State Controller

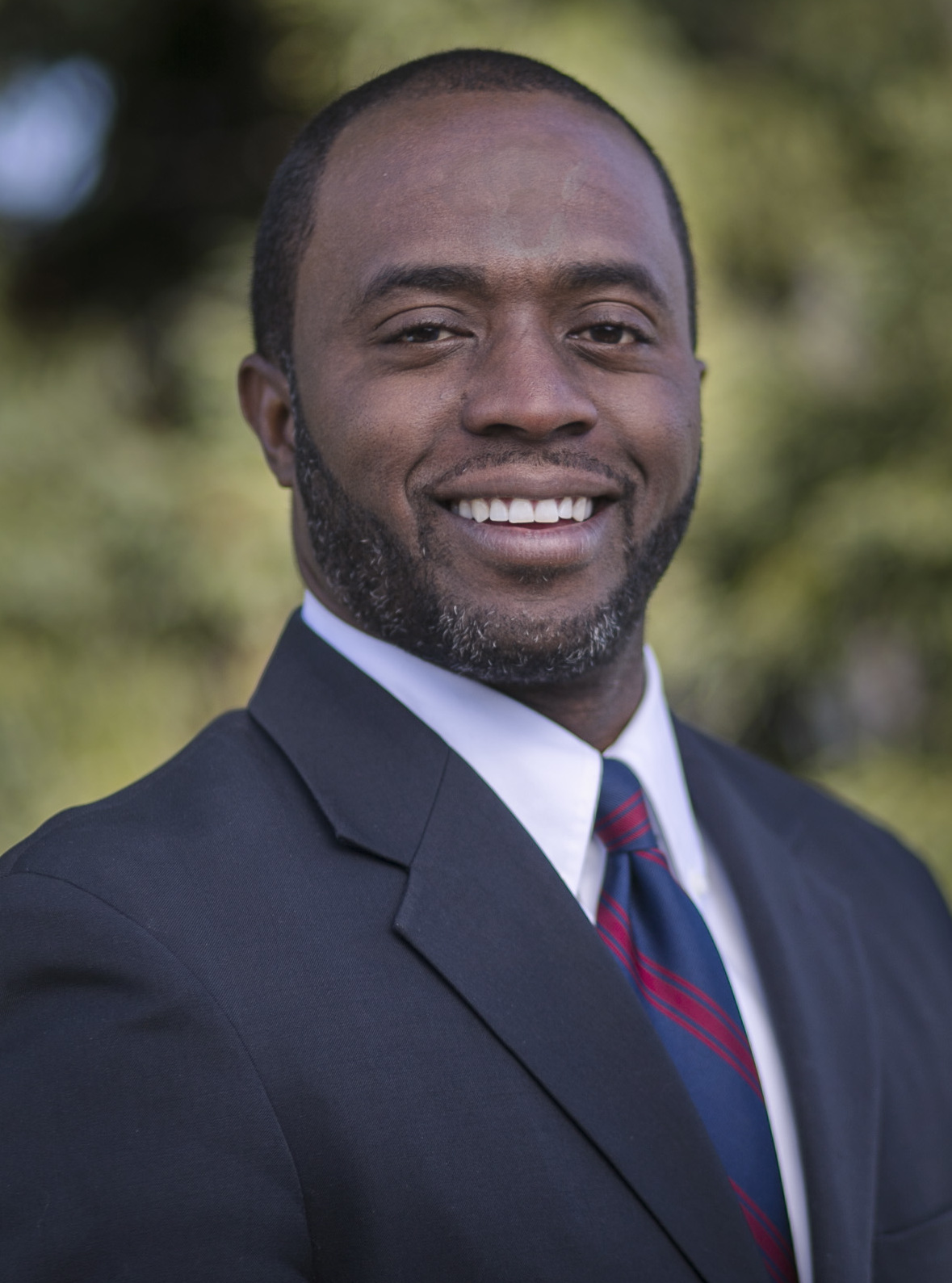
Tony Thurmond (D)
State Superintendent of Public Instruction

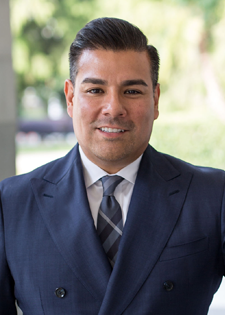
Ricardo Lara (D)
Insurance Commissioner

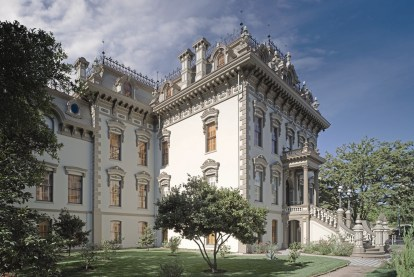
Stanford Mansion is the official reception center for the California government and one of the workplaces of the governor of California.

California uses a presidential system and all offices are elected separately to concurrent four-year terms, and each officer may be elected to an office a maximum of two times. The governor has the powers and responsibilities to: sign or veto laws passed by the Legislature, including a line item veto; appoint judges, subject to ratification by the electorate; propose a state budget; give the annual State of the State address; command the state militia; and grant pardons for any crime, except cases involving impeachment by the Legislature. The lieutenant governor is the president of the California Senate and acts as the governor when the governor is unable to execute the office, including whenever the governor leaves the state. The governor and lieutenant governor also serve as ex officio members of the University of California Board of Regents and of the California State University Board of Trustees. Regulatory activity is published in the California Regulatory Notice Register and the general and permanent rules and regulations are codified in the California Code of Regulations.

=== State agencies ===
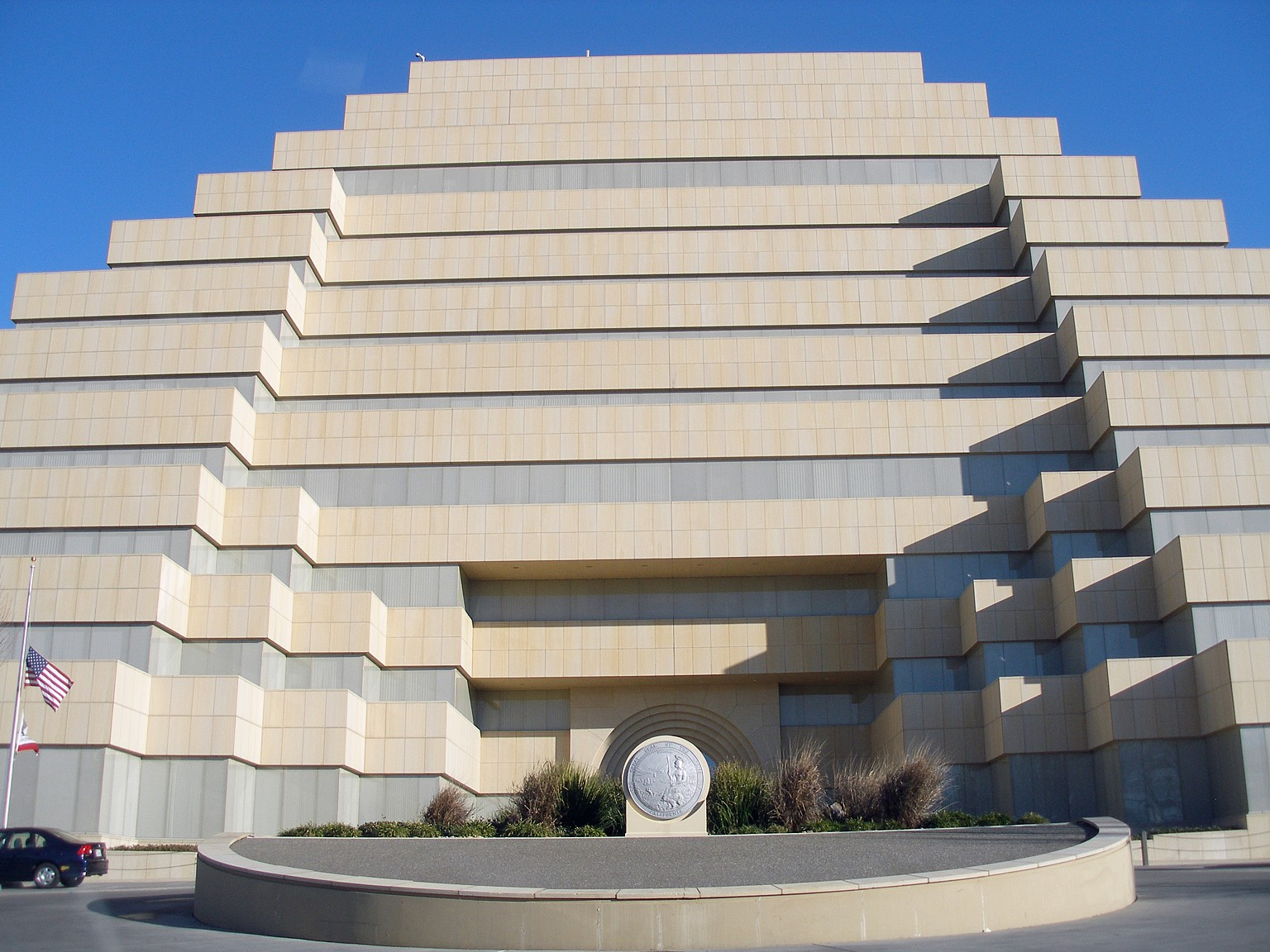
Cal Department of General Services

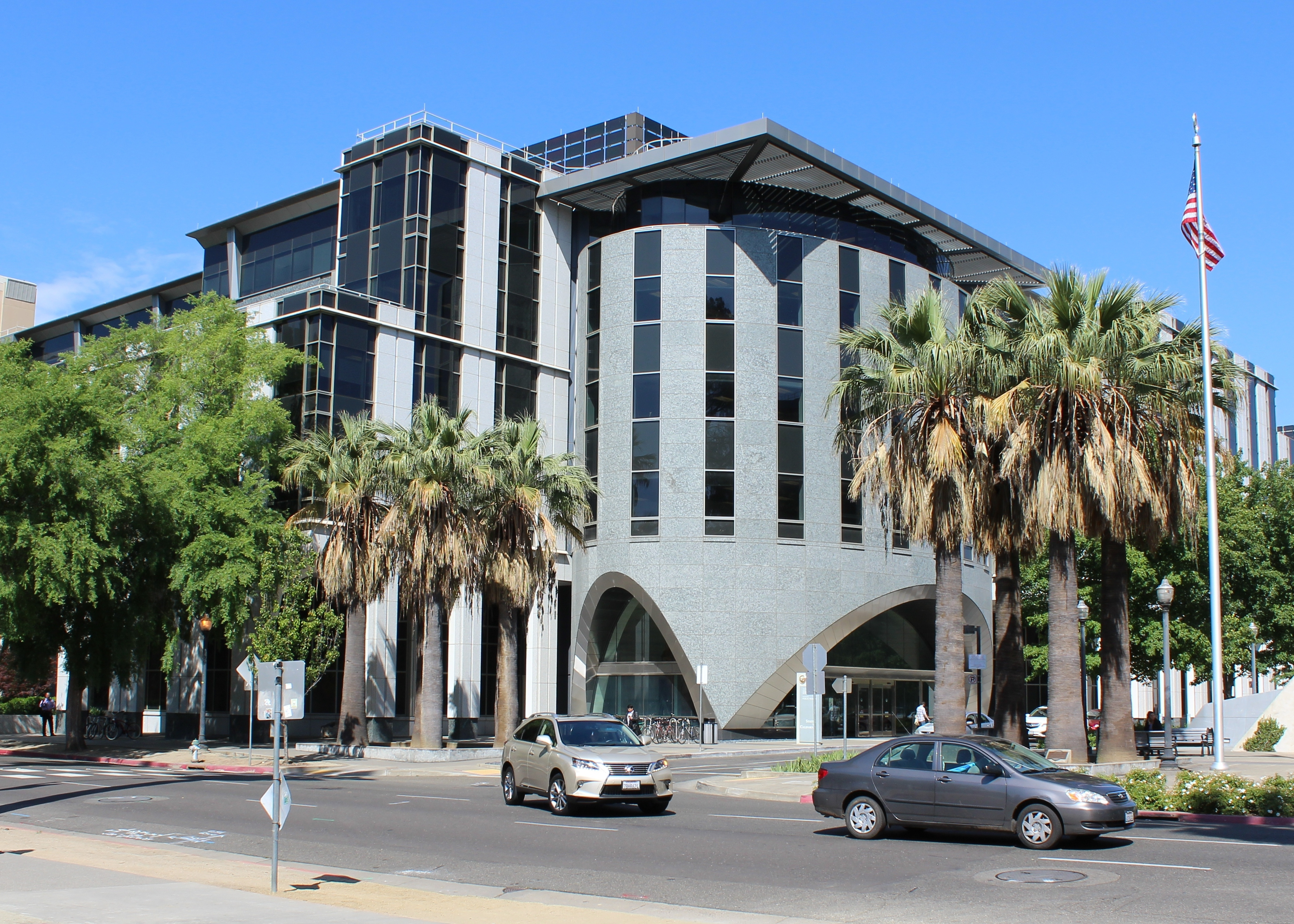
Cal Department of Health Care Services

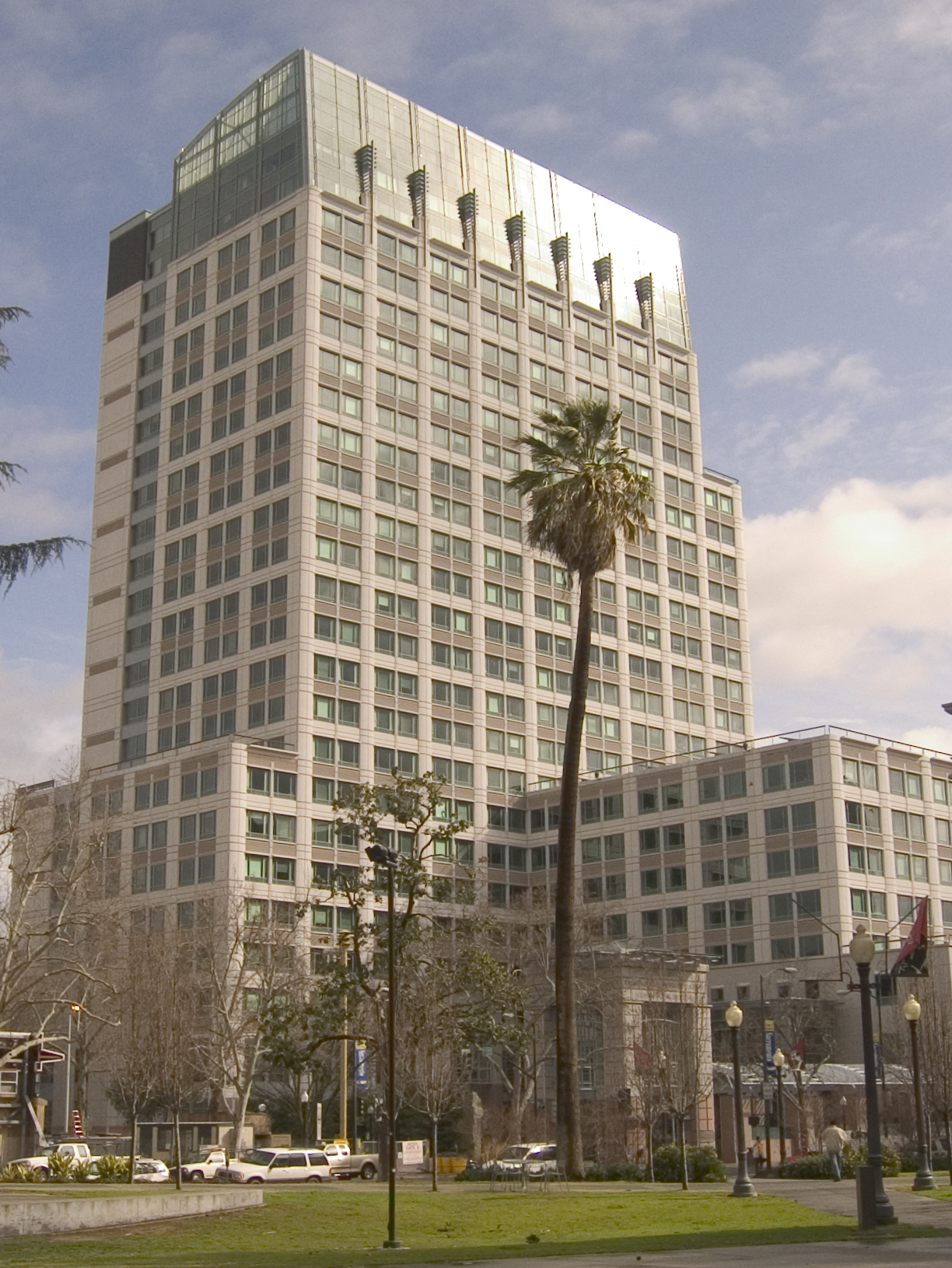
Cal Environmental Protection Agency

State government is organized into many departments, of which most have been grouped together into several huge Cabinet-level agencies since the administration of Governor Pat Brown. These agencies are sometimes informally referred to as superagencies, especially by government officials, to distinguish them from the general usage of the term "government agency". When Brown took office, he was dismayed to discover that under California law, approximately 360 boards, commissions, and agencies all reported directly to the governor, and proposed his "super-agency" plan (then spelled with a hyphen) in February 1961 to impose order on such chaos. Brown appointed the secretaries of the first four superagencies (of eight then planned) in September 1961.

The superagencies operate as "umbrella organizations" or "semiautonomous fiefdoms," but their Cabinet-level secretaries are not quite as powerful as they may appear at first glance. The governor continues to directly appoint the leaders of superagency components. The appointments are announced by the governor rather than by the secretaries, who are merely a layer of management installed to ensure that the components of their respective superagencies can stay outside of the governor's "routine attention span" (unless something goes wrong). Today, the Cabinet-level agencies (superagencies) are the:

- California Business and Consumer Services Agency (BCSA)
- California Government Operations Agency (CalGovOps)
- California Environmental Protection Agency (CalEPA)
- California Health and Human Services Agency (CalHHS)
- California Housing and Homelessness Agency (CHHA)
- California Labor and Workforce Development Agency (LWDA)
- California Natural Resources Agency (CNRA)
- California State Transportation Agency (CalSTA)

The independently elected officers run separate departments not grouped within the superagencies, and there are other Cabinet-level departments:

- Department of Corrections and Rehabilitation (CDCR)
- Department of Education (CDE)
- Department of Finance (DOF)
- Department of Food and Agriculture (CDFA)
- Department of Insurance (CDI)
- Department of Justice (DOJ)
- Military Department

=== Independent entities ===
Most (but not all) of the leaders of these entities are normally appointed by the governor and confirmed by the state Senate. Despite their independence, the governor can exert influence on them over time by waiting for incumbent leaders to reach the ends of their terms and appointing new ones who support the governor's current agenda.

Examples include the:

- Regents of the University of California
- California State University Board of Trustees
- California Community Colleges Board of Governors
- California Public Utilities Commission
- California State Auditor
- Fair Political Practices Commission

== Legislative branch ==
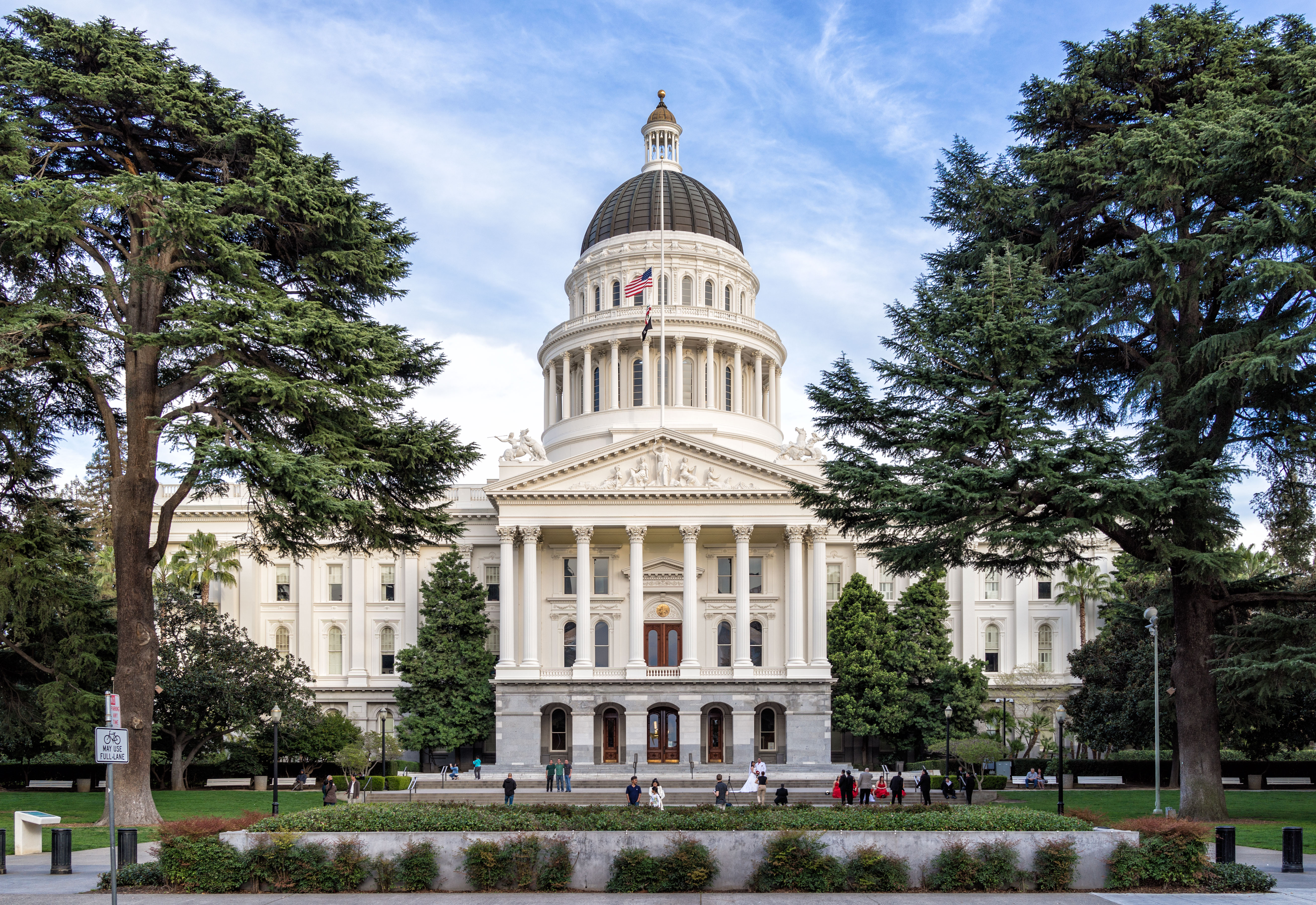
The California State Capitol hosts the California Assembly and the California Senate, the two houses of the California State Legislature.

The California State Legislature is the state legislature. It is a bicameral body consisting of the California State Assembly, the lower house with 80 members, and the California State Senate, the upper house with 40 members. Members of the Assembly serve two-year terms; members of the Senate serve four-year terms, with half of the seats up for election on alternate (two year) election cycles.

The speaker of the California State Assembly presides over the State Assembly. The lieutenant governor is the ex officio president of the Senate and may break a tied vote, and the president pro tempore of the California State Senate is elected by the majority party caucus.

The Legislature meets in the California State Capitol in Sacramento. Its session laws are published in the California Statutes and codified into the 29 California Codes.

The legislature supports the Office of Legislative Counsel and the Legislative Analyst's Office.

== Judicial branch ==
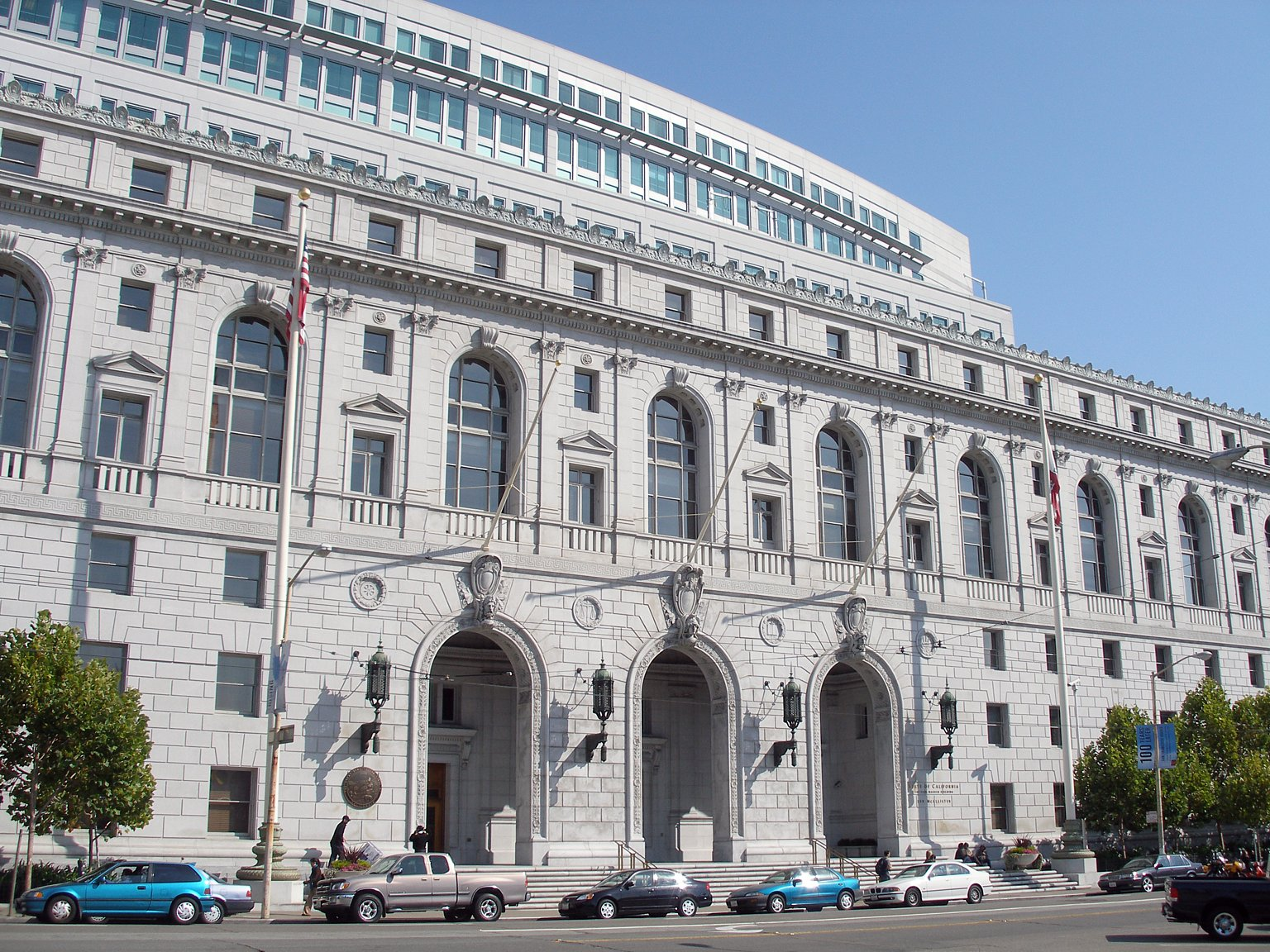
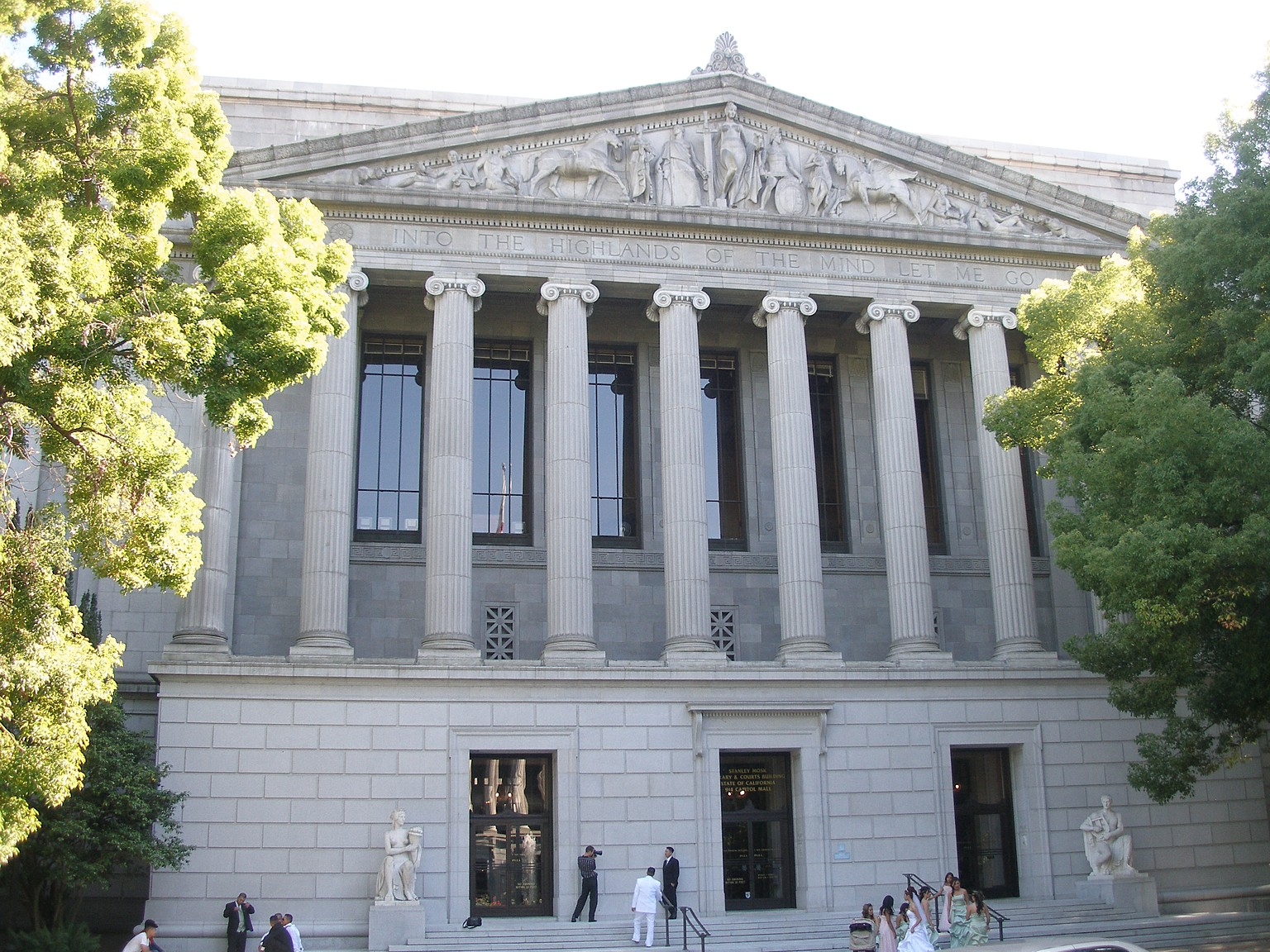
The Supreme Court of California is headquartered in San Francisco (top), but also hears oral argument each year at Sacramento (bottom) and Los Angeles.

The judiciary of California interprets and applies the law, and is defined under the Constitution, law, and regulations. The judiciary has a hierarchical structure with the Supreme Court at the apex. The superior courts are the primary trial courts, and the courts of appeal are the primary appellate courts.

The Judicial Council is the rule-making arm of the judiciary.

The California Supreme Court consists of the chief justice of California and six associate justices. The court has original jurisdiction in a variety of cases, including habeas corpus proceedings, and has discretionary authority to review all the decisions of the California courts of appeal, as well as mandatory review responsibility for cases where the death penalty has been imposed. The courts of appeal are the intermediate appellate courts. The state is geographically divided into six appellate districts. Notably, all published California appellate decisions are binding on all superior courts, regardless of appellate district.

The California superior courts are the courts of general jurisdiction that hear and decide any civil or criminal action which is not specially designated to be heard before some other court or governmental agency. As mandated by the Constitution, each of the 58 counties has a superior court. The superior courts also have appellate divisions (superior court judges sitting as appellate judges) which hear appeals from decisions of other superior court judges (or commissioners, or judges pro tem) in cases previously heard by inferior courts, such as infractions, misdemeanors, and "limited civil" actions (actions where the amount in controversy is below $25,000).

== Direct democracy ==
The state constitution allows direct participation of the electorate by initiative, referendum, and recall.

== Watchdog evaluations ==
In a 2015 review by the nonprofit Center for Public Integrity of how effectively states promote transparency and procedures to reduce corruption, California received a C−, the second-highest grade in the country. It ranked particularly low in public access to information and judicial transparency.

In 2005, Pew Research Center's Government Performance Project gave California a grade C−, tied for last with Alabama. By 2008, when the last report was issued, California had a C, which placed it near the bottom of the states. In discussing the results, the report noted that the personnel system is known to be dysfunctional, and that the Human Resources Modernization Project was underway to address the issue.

== Local government ==
California is divided into counties which are legal subdivisions of the state. There are 58 counties, 482 California cities, about 1,102 school districts, and about 3,400 special districts. Counties and incorporated cities may promulgate local ordinances, which are usually codified in county or city codes, respectively, and are misdemeanor crimes unless otherwise specified as infractions. School districts, which are independent of cities and counties, handle public education. Special Districts deliver specific public programs and public facilities to constituents, and are defined as "any agency of the state for the local performance of governmental or proprietary functions within limited boundaries".

City halls in California

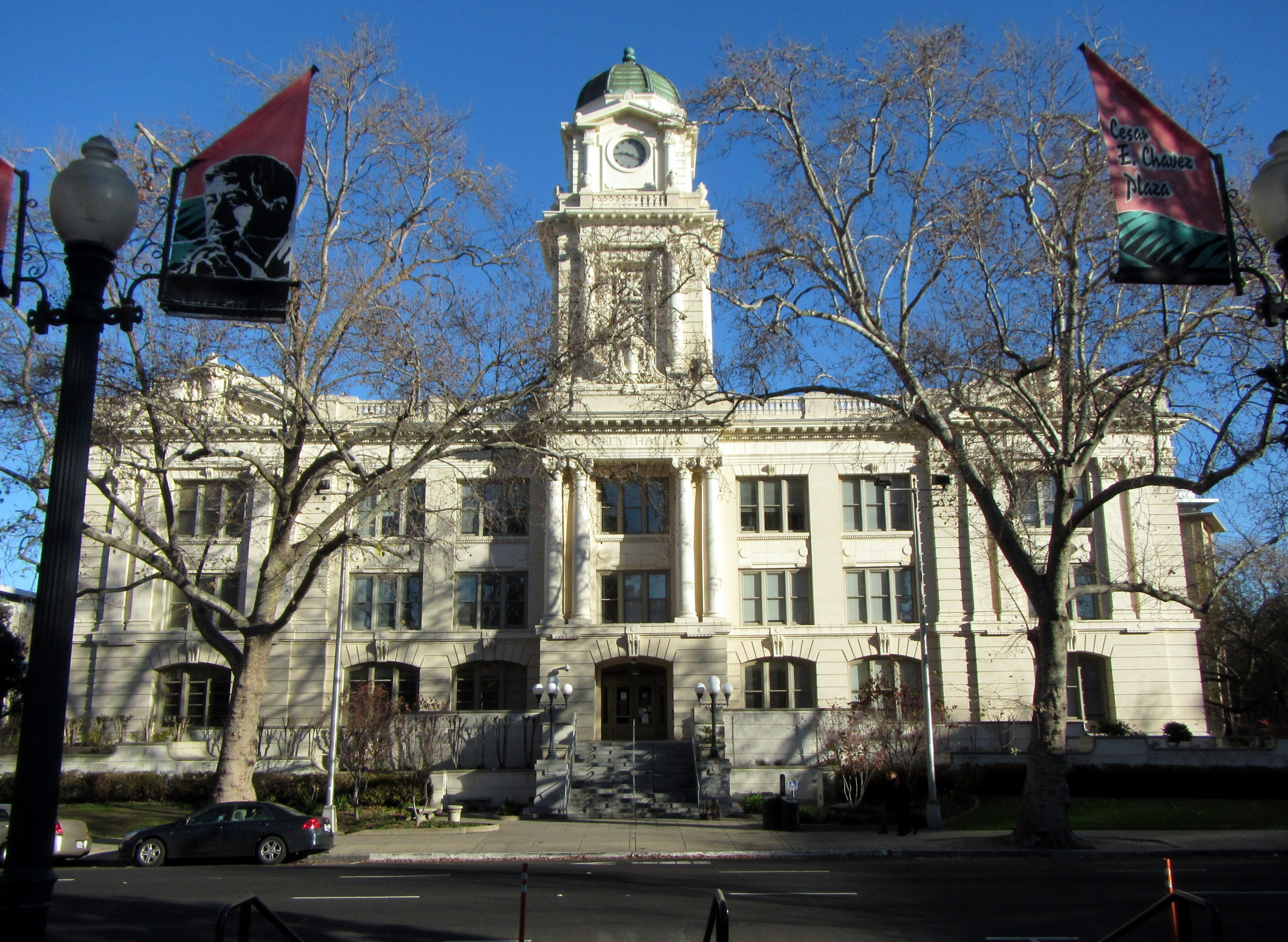
Sacramento City Hall

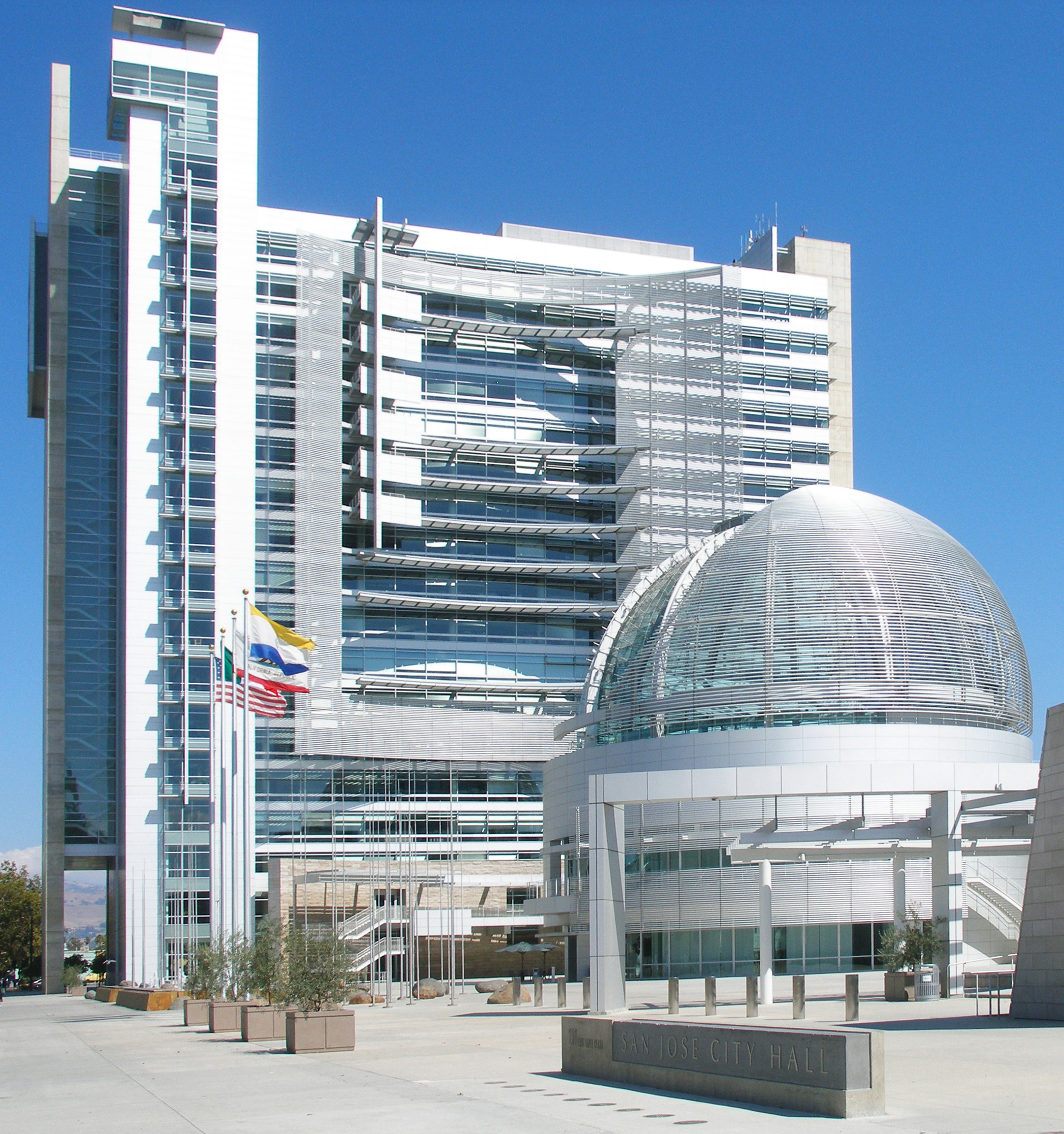
San José City Hall

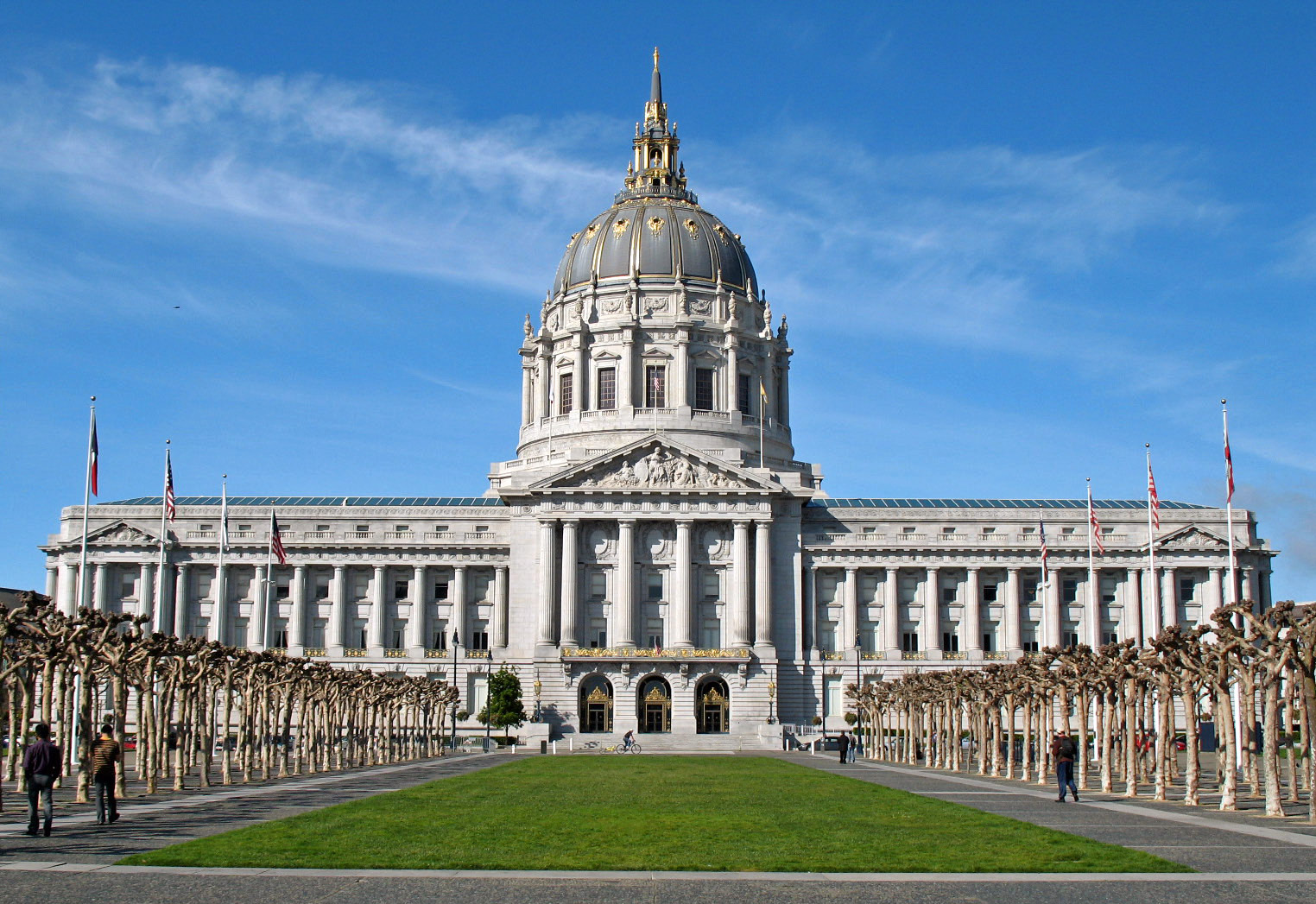
San Francisco City Hall

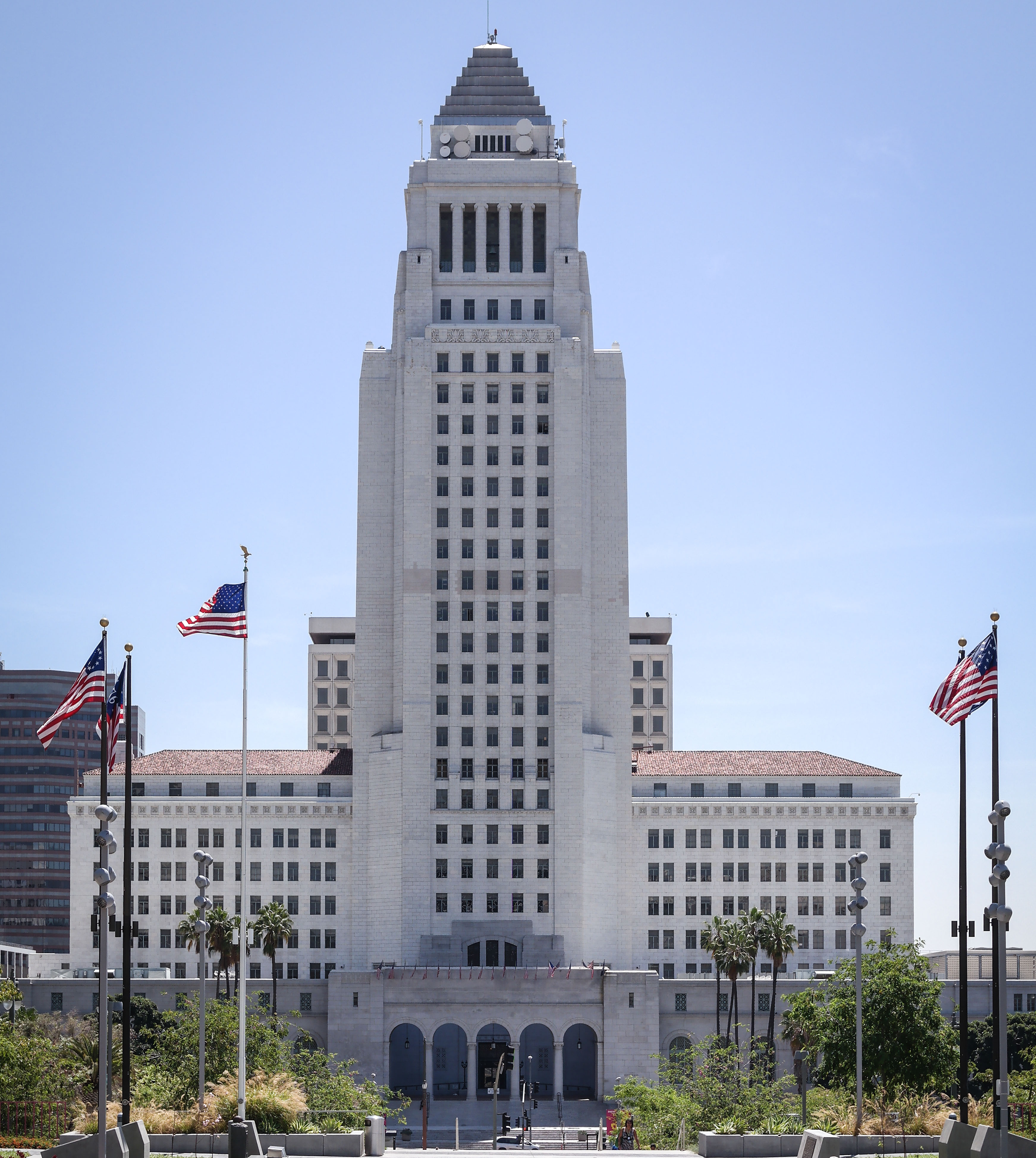
Los Angeles City Hall

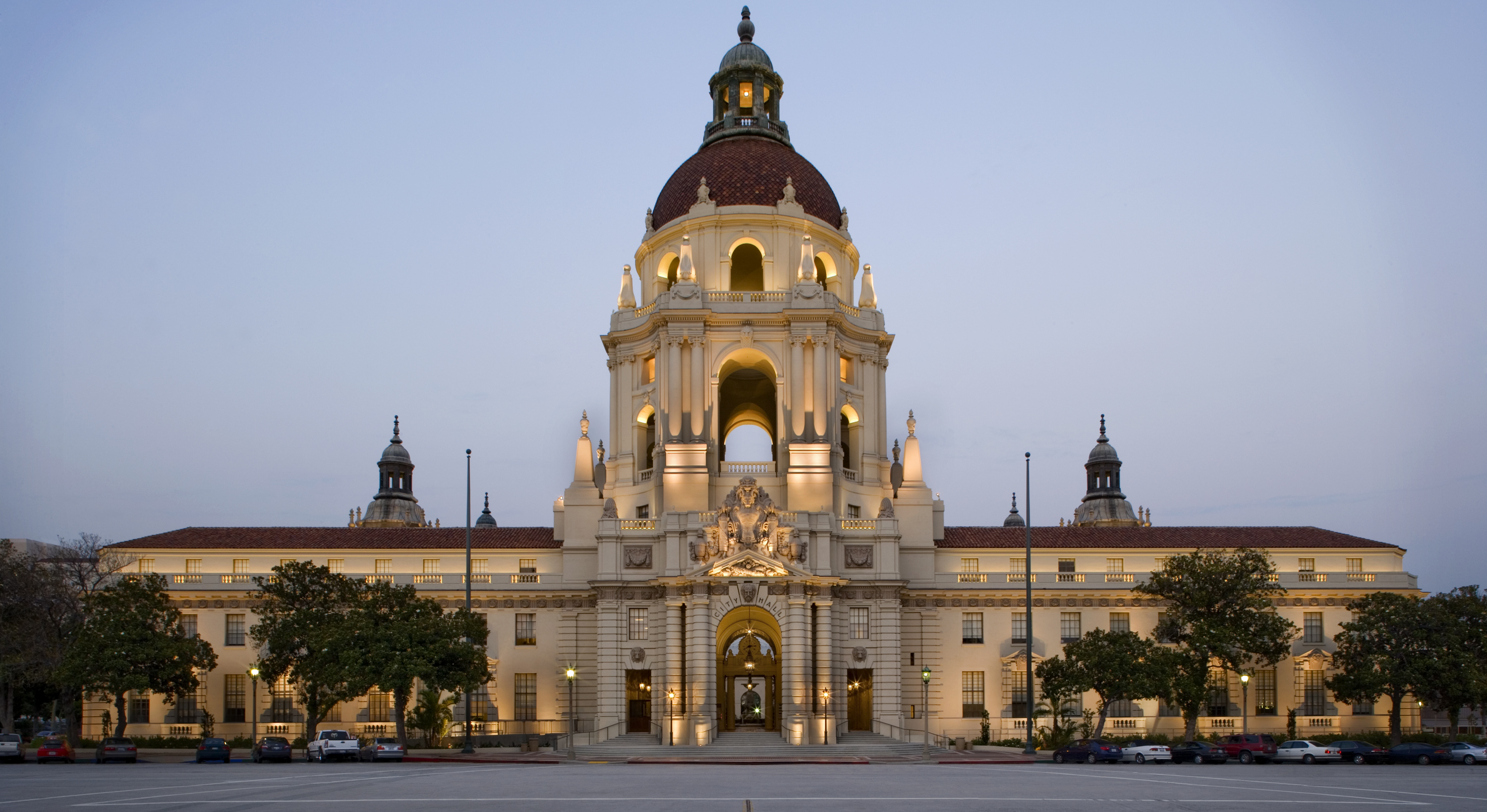
Pasadena City Hall

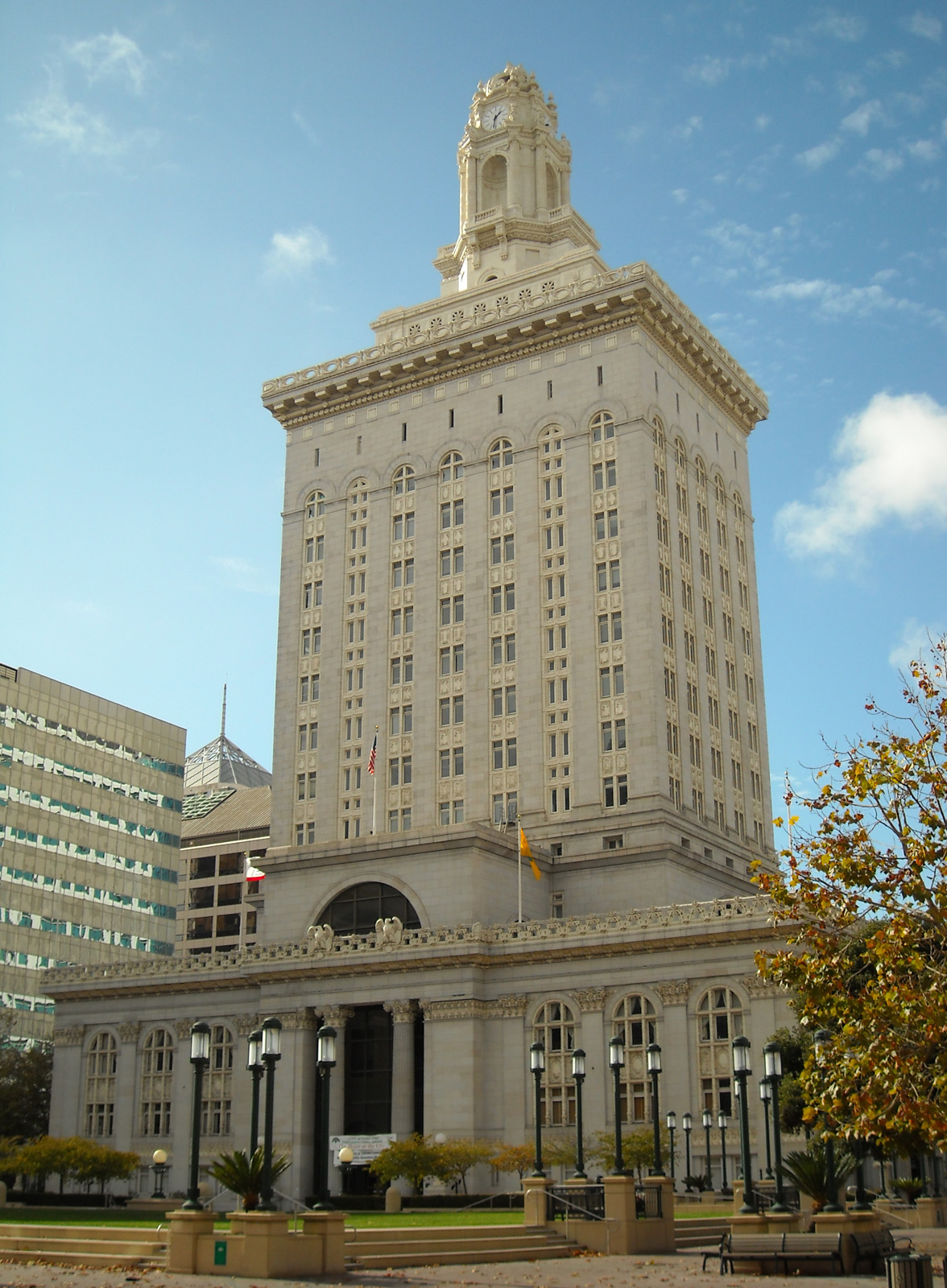
Oakland City Hall

== Foreign relations ==
California is a member of the Commission of the Californias, a tri-lateral forum for cooperation between the U.S. state of California and the Mexican states of Baja California and Baja California Sur.

== See also ==
- Politics of California
- Elections in California
- Law of California
