= California Assembly Bill 72 (2017) =

California Assembly Bill 72 (AB 72) is a 2017 California statute which amends the Planning and Zoning Law to grant the California Department of Housing and Community Development (HCD) enforcement authority with respect to four statutes: the HAA, State Density Bonus Law, fair housing law (Section 65008 of the Government Code) and the "no net loss" requirements for replacing housing element sites that are not developed as projected (Section 65863 of the Government Code). The law requires the department to notify both a local government and the Attorney General of the local government's specified violation of the aforementioned laws as well as need for enforcement, and for the attorney general to sue the offending government in state court.

The law expanded the powers of the HCD in the construction of affordable housing. The bill was signed into law by Governor Jerry Brown on September 29, 2017.

== Amendments and related legislation ==
AB 215 was signed by Governor Gavin Newsom on September 28, 2021, extending HCD's list of laws to notify the attorney general of violations to the Housing Crisis Act (SB 330, 2019), the Affirmatively Furthering Fair Housing (AFFH) policies (AB 686), SB 35 Streamlining, Permanent Supportive Housing streamlining (AB 2162) and Low Barrier Navigation Center streamlining (AB 101). In addition, the law allows the HCD the ability to hire or appoint other counsel if the attorney general does not pursue action against a local agency regarding a violation.

AB 434 was signed by Newsom on October 11, 2023, expanding the HCD's enforcement powers to enforce the streamlining of HOME Act (SB 9) projects concerning ministerial processing of lot splits in single-family residential zones, along with the streamlining of projects which fall under the ADU law, SB 6 (2022), SB 4 (2023), SB 684 (2023) and AB 1218 (2023).

Other bills were passed to similar effect in the following years, including SB 35 (2017), SB 330 (2019), AB 2011 (2022) and SB 79 (2025).

AB 1037 (2024) subjects local governments found by a state court in violation of the above statutes to mandatory fines per violation, ranging from a minimum of $10,000 to a maximum of $50,000, in addition to court fees. Fines paid by a local government are directed to the Building Homes and Jobs Trust Fund for the sole purpose of supporting the development of affordable housing located in the affected jurisdiction.
