= California State Legislature, 2021–2022 session =

2021–22 session of the California State Legislature
←	2019–2020	2023–2024	→
- The Seal of California

Overview
- Legislative body: California State Legislature
- Jurisdiction: California
- Term: December 7, 2020 – November 30, 2022

Senate
- Members: 40
- President of the Senate: Eleni Kounalakis (D) Jan. 7, 2019 - present
- President pro tempore: Toni Atkins (D–39th); Dec. 3, 2018 – present
- Minority Leader: Shannon Grove (R–16th) Mar. 1, 2019 – Jan. 20, 2021; Scott Wilk (R–21st) Jan. 20, 2021 – present
- Party control: Democratic

Assembly
- Members: 80
- Speaker: Anthony Rendon (D–63rd); Dec. 3, 2018 – present
- Minority Leader: Marie Waldron (R–75th) Dec. 3, 2018 – Feb. 8, 2022; James Gallagher (R–3rd) Feb. 8, 2022 – present
- Party control: Democratic

The 2021–22 session is the most recent former session of the California State Legislature. The session first convened on December 7, 2020 and ended November 30, 2022.

== Major events ==
=== Vacancies and special elections ===
- December 6, 2020: Democratic senator Holly Mitchell (30th–Los Angeles) resigns one day before the session begins to take her seat on the Los Angeles County Board of Supervisors
- January 29, 2021: Democratic assemblymember Shirley Weber (79th–San Diego) resigns to become Secretary of State
- March 11, 2021: Democratic assemblymember Sydney Kamlager (54th–Los Angeles) resigns and is sworn into office after winning the March 2 special election for the 30th State Senate district to replace Mitchell
- April 19, 2021: Democratic councilmember Akilah Weber (La Mesa) is sworn into office after winning the April 6 special election for the 79th State Assembly district to replace her mother
- April 23, 2021: Democratic assemblymember Rob Bonta (18th–Alameda) resigns to become Attorney General
- May 28, 2021: Democratic policy advisor Isaac Bryan (Los Angeles) is sworn into office after winning the May 18th special election for the 54th State Assembly district to replace Kamlager
- September 7, 2021: Democratic school board member Mia Bonta (Alameda) is sworn into office after winning the August 31 special election for the 18th State Assembly district to replace her husband
- October 31, 2021: Democratic assemblymember David Chiu (17th-San Francisco) resigns to become the City Attorney of San Francisco
- December 10, 2021: Democratic assemblymember Ed Chau (49th-Arcadia) resigns to become a judge of the Los Angeles County Superior Court
- December 31, 2021: Democratic assemblymember Jim Frazier (11th-Discovery Bay) resigns to work in the transportation sector
- January 5, 2022: Democratic assemblymember Lorena Gonzales (80th-San Diego) resigns to become leader of the California Federation of Labor of the AFL–CIO
- January 31, 2022: Democratic assemblymember Autumn Burke (62nd-Marina Del Ray) resigns due to family challenges from the COVID-19 Pandemic
- February 22, 2022: Democratic county administrator Mike Fong (Alhambra) is sworn into office after winning the February 15 special election for the 49th State Assembly district to replace Chau
- April 6, 2022: Democratic mayor Lori Wilson (Suisun City) is sworn into office after winning the April 5 special election for the 11th State Assembly district to replace Frazier
- May 3, 2022: Democratic county supervisor Matt Haney (San Francisco) is sworn into office after winning the April 19 special election for the 17th State Assembly district to replace Chiu
- June 15, 2022: Democratic former city councilmen David Alvarez (Barrio Logan) is sworn into office after winning the June 7 special election for the 80th State Assembly district to replace Gonzales
- June 20, 2022: Democratic activist and former legislative staffer Tina McKinnor (Hawthorne) is sworn into office after winning the June 7 special election for the 62nd State Assembly district to replace Burke

=== Leadership changes ===
- January 20, 2021: Republican senator Scott Wilk (21st–Santa Clarita) replaces senator Shannon Grove (16th–Bakersfield) as Senate minority leader, as Grove was ousted after she incorrectly blamed the 2021 storming of the United States Capitol on antifa.
- January 19, 2022: Democratic senator Mike McGuire (2nd-Healdsburg) replaces senator Robert Hertzberg (18th-Van Nuys) as Senate majority leader
- February 8, 2022: Republican assemblymember James Gallagher (3rd–Yuba City) replaces assemblymember Marie Waldron (75th–Valley Center) as Assembly minority leader.

=== Legislation ===
In 2022, notable laws passed included:

- A new court system for people with mental illness and addiction called the Community Assistance, Recovery and Empowerment Court (CARE Court)
- AB257 for unionization of fast-food workers
- AB2011 and its companion SB6 for changing permitting processes to streamline affordable housing
- AB 2097, a ban on parking minimums for buildings within 1/2 mile (0.80 km) of public transit.
- For climate change, a variety of climate-related bills which were part of an agenda by Governor Newsom, including:
  - a bill which would keep the Diablo Canyon nuclear power plant open until 2035
  - a law named the California Climate Crisis Act, AB1279, which was similar to a proposed law of the same name in 2021 which did not pass
- For reproductive rights, expanded access to abortion
- For gun reform, laws which allowed victims of gun violence to sue gun manufacturers
- A law allowing the California Medical Board to discipline doctors who promote misinformation about COVID-19 vaccination
- On plastic pollution and plastic recycling, SB54 was passed which requires 65 percent of single-use plastic to be recycled by 2032; this law had been originally introduced in 2018 and had been the subject of lengthy negotiation over 4 years

In 2021, notable laws passed included:

- Several police reform laws, including SB2 which outlines a process for officers to be removed for misconduct, including facing potential civil liability
- A law to prevent wildfires through preventive measures, including through hiring more state employees
- A climate change law (AB1395) named the California Climate Crisis Act failed to pass, but a similar bill (AB1279) with the same name passed in 2022
- California HOME Act (SB9), which creates a legal process by which owners of certain single-family homes can create additional units on their property, and prohibits cities and counties from interference

== State Senate ==
Composition of the California State Senate Democratic Party Republican Party

↓
31	9
Democratic	Republican

=== Officers ===
Position	Name	Party	District
Lieutenant Governor	Eleni Kounalakis	Democratic	
President pro tempore	Toni Atkins	Democratic	39th–San Diego
Majority leader	Mike McGuire	Democratic	2nd-Healdsburg
Assistant majority leader	Susan Eggman	Democratic	5th-Stockton
Majority whip	Nancy Skinner	Democratic	9th–Berkeley
Assistant majority whips	Maria Elena Durazo	Democratic	24th–Los Angeles
Assistant majority whips	Scott Wiener	Democratic	11th–San Francisco
Democratic caucus chair	Connie Leyva	Democratic	20th–Chino
Minority leader	Scott Wilk	Republican	21st–Santa Clarita
Secretary	Erika Contreras		
Sergeant-at-Arms	Jodie O. Barnett III		
Chaplain	Sister Michelle Gorman, RSM		

The Secretary, the Sergeant-at-Arms, and the chaplain are not members of the Legislature.

=== Members ===
District	Name	Party	Residence	Term-limited?	Notes
1	Brian Dahle	Republican	Bieber		
2	Mike McGuire	Democratic	Healdsburg		Majority Leader since January 19, 2022
3	Bill Dodd	Democratic	Napa		
4	Jim Nielsen	Republican	Red Bluff	Yes	
5	Susan Eggman	Democratic	Stockton		
6	Richard Pan	Democratic	Sacramento	Yes	
7	Steve Glazer	Democratic	Orinda		
8	Andreas Borgeas	Republican	Fresno		
9	Nancy Skinner	Democratic	Berkeley		
10	Bob Wieckowski	Democratic	Fremont	Yes	
11	Scott Wiener	Democratic	San Francisco		
12	Anna Caballero	Democratic	Salinas		
13	Josh Becker	Democratic	Menlo Park		
14	Melissa Hurtado	Democratic	Sanger		
15	Dave Cortese	Democratic	San Jose		
16	Shannon Grove	Republican	Bakersfield		Minority Leader March 1, 2019 to January 20, 2021
17	John Laird	Democratic	Carmel		
18	Robert Hertzberg	Democratic	Van Nuys	Yes	Majority Leader January 7, 2019 to January 19, 2022
19	Monique Limón	Democratic	Santa Barbara		
20	Connie Leyva	Democratic	Chino		
21	Scott Wilk	Republican	Santa Clarita		Minority Leader since January 20, 2021
22	Susan Rubio	Democratic	Baldwin Park		
23	Rosilicie Ochoa Bogh	Republican	Yucaipa		
24	Maria Elena Durazo	Democratic	Los Angeles		
25	Anthony Portantino	Democratic	La Cañada Flintridge		
26	Ben Allen	Democratic	Santa Monica		
27	Henry Stern	Democratic	Malibu		
28	Melissa Melendez	Republican	Lake	Yes	
29	Josh Newman	Democratic	Fullerton		
30	Vacant from December 7, 2020 to March 11, 2021				
30	Sydney Kamlager	Democratic	Los Angeles		
31	Richard Roth	Democratic	Riverside		
32	Bob Archuleta	Democratic	Pico Rivera		
33	Lena Gonzalez	Democratic	Long Beach		
34	Tom Umberg	Democratic	Santa Ana		
35	Steven Bradford	Democratic	Gardena		
36	Patricia Bates	Republican	Laguna Niguel	Yes	Minority Leader until March 1, 2019
37	Dave Min	Democratic	Irvine		
38	Brian Jones	Republican	Santee		
39	Toni Atkins	Democratic	San Diego		President pro tempore
40	Ben Hueso	Democratic	San Diego	Yes	

== State Assembly ==
Composition of the California State Assembly Democratic Party Republican Party Independent

↓
59	1	19
Democratic	I	Republican

=== Officers ===
Position	Name	Party	District
Speaker	Anthony Rendon	Democratic	63rd–Lakewood
Speaker pro tempore	Kevin Mullin	Democratic	22nd–South San Francisco
Assistant speaker pro tempore	Mia Bonta	Democratic	18th–Alameda
Majority leader	Eloise Reyes	Democratic	47th–Grand Terrace
Assistant majority leader	Chris Ward	Democratic	78th–San Diego
Assistant majority leader for policy and research	Tasha Boerner Horvath	Democratic	76th–Encinitas
Democratic caucus chair	Mike Gipson	Democratic	64th–Carson
Republican leader	James Gallagher	Republican	3rd–Yuba City
Acting Chief Clerk	Sue Parker		
Acting Chief Sergeant-at-Arms	Alisa Buckley		
Chaplain	Imam Mohammad "Yasir" Khan		

The Chief Clerk, the acting Chief Sergeant-at-Arms, and the chaplain are not members of the Legislature.

=== Members ===
District	Name	Party	Residence	Term-limited?	Notes
1	Megan Dahle	Republican	Bieber		
2	Jim Wood	Democratic	Santa Rosa		
3	James Gallagher	Republican	Yuba City		Minority leader since February 8, 2022
4	Cecilia Aguiar-Curry	Democratic	Winters		
5	Frank Bigelow	Republican	O'Neals		
6	Kevin Kiley	Republican	Rocklin		
7	Kevin McCarty	Democratic	Sacramento		
8	Ken Cooley	Democratic	Rancho Cordova		
9	Jim Cooper	Democratic	Elk Grove		
10	Marc Levine	Democratic	Greenbrae		
11	Jim Frazier	Democratic	Discovery Bay		Resigned on December 31, 2021
11	Vacant from December 31, 2021 to April 6, 2022				
11	Lori Wilson	Democratic	Suisun City		
12	Heath Flora	Republican	Ripon		
13	Carlos Villapudua	Democratic	Stockton		
14	Tim Grayson	Democratic	Concord		
15	Buffy Wicks	Democratic	Oakland		
16	Rebecca Bauer-Kahan	Democratic	Orinda		
17	David Chiu	Democratic	San Francisco		Resigned on October 31, 2021, to become City Attorney of San Francisco
17	Vacant from October 31, 2021 to May 3, 2022				
17	Matt Haney	Democratic	San Francisco		
18	Rob Bonta	Democratic	Alameda		Resigned on April 22, 2021, to become Attorney General of California
18	Vacant from April 22, 2021, to September 7, 2021				
18	Mia Bonta	Democratic	Alameda		
19	Phil Ting	Democratic	San Francisco		
20	Bill Quirk	Democratic	Hayward		
21	Adam Gray	Democratic	Merced		
22	Kevin Mullin	Democratic	South San Francisco		
23	Jim Patterson	Republican	Fresno		
24	Marc Berman	Democratic	Palo Alto		
25	Alex Lee	Democratic	San Jose		
26	Devon Mathis	Republican	Visalia		
27	Ash Kalra	Democratic	San Jose		
28	Evan Low	Democratic	Campbell		
29	Mark Stone	Democratic	Scotts Valley		
30	Robert Rivas	Democratic	Hollister		
31	Joaquin Arambula	Democratic	Fresno		
32	Rudy Salas	Democratic	Bakersfield		
33	Thurston Smith	Republican	Hesperia		
34	Vince Fong	Republican	Bakersfield		
35	Jordan Cunningham	Republican	Paso Robles		
36	Tom Lackey	Republican	Palmdale		
37	Steve Bennett	Democratic	Ojai		
38	Suzette Martinez Valladares	Republican	Santa Clarita		
39	Luz Rivas	Democratic	North Hollywood		
40	James Ramos	Democratic	Highland		
41	Chris Holden	Democratic	Pasadena		
42	Chad Mayes	Independent	Yucca Valley		
43	Laura Friedman	Democratic	Glendale		
44	Jacqui Irwin	Democratic	Thousand Oaks		
45	Jesse Gabriel	Democratic	Encino		
46	Adrin Nazarian	Democratic	North Hollywood		
47	Eloise Reyes	Democratic	Grand Terrace		
48	Blanca Rubio	Democratic	Baldwin Park		
49	Ed Chau	Democratic	Arcadia		Resigned on December 10, 2021, to become a judge on the Los Angeles County Superior Court
49	Vacant from December 10, 2021 to February 22, 2022				
49	Mike Fong	Democratic	Alhambra		
50	Richard Bloom	Democratic	Santa Monica		
51	Wendy Carrillo	Democratic	Boyle Heights		
52	Freddie Rodriguez	Democratic	Pomona		
53	Miguel Santiago	Democratic	Los Angeles		
54	Sydney Kamlager	Democratic	Los Angeles		Resigned on March 11, 2021, to assume seat in the California State Senate
54	Vacant from March 11, 2021, to May 28, 2021				
54	Isaac Bryan	Democratic	Los Angeles		
55	Phillip Chen	Republican	Yorba Linda		
56	Eduardo Garcia	Democratic	Coachella		
57	Lisa Calderon	Democratic	Whittier		
58	Cristina Garcia	Democratic	Bell Gardens		
59	Reggie Jones-Sawyer	Democratic	Los Angeles		
60	Sabrina Cervantes	Democratic	Riverside		
61	Jose Medina	Democratic	Riverside		
62	Autumn Burke	Democratic	Marina del Rey		Resigned on January 31, 2022
62	Vacant from January 31, 2022 to June 20, 2022				
62	Tina McKinnor	Democratic	Hawthorne		
63	Anthony Rendon	Democratic	Lakewood		Speaker
64	Mike Gipson	Democratic	Carson		
65	Sharon Quirk-Silva	Democratic	Fullerton		
66	Al Muratsuchi	Democratic	Rolling Hills Estates		
67	Kelly Seyarto	Republican	Murrieta		
68	Steven Choi	Republican	Irvine		
69	Tom Daly	Democratic	Anaheim		
70	Patrick O'Donnell	Democratic	Long Beach		
71	Randy Voepel	Republican	Santee		
72	Janet Nguyen	Republican	Huntington Beach		
73	Laurie Davies	Republican	Laguna Niguel		
74	Cottie Petrie-Norris	Democratic	Laguna Beach		
75	Marie Waldron	Republican	Escondido		Minority leader from November 8, 2021, to February 8, 2022
76	Tasha Boerner Horvath	Democratic	Encinitas		
77	Brian Maienschein	Democratic	San Diego		
78	Chris Ward	Democratic	San Diego		
79	Shirley Weber	Democratic	San Diego		Resigned on January 28, 2021, to become Secretary of State of California
79	Vacant from January 28, 2021, to April 19, 2021				
79	Akilah Weber	Democratic	La Mesa		
80	Lorena Gonzalez	Democratic	San Diego		Resigned on January 5, 2022 to become head of the California Labor Federation
80	Vacant from January 5, 2022 to June 15, 2022				
80	David Alvarez	Democratic	Barrio Logan		

== See also ==
- List of California state legislatures
