= California Department of Housing and Community Development =

Department of Housing and Community Development
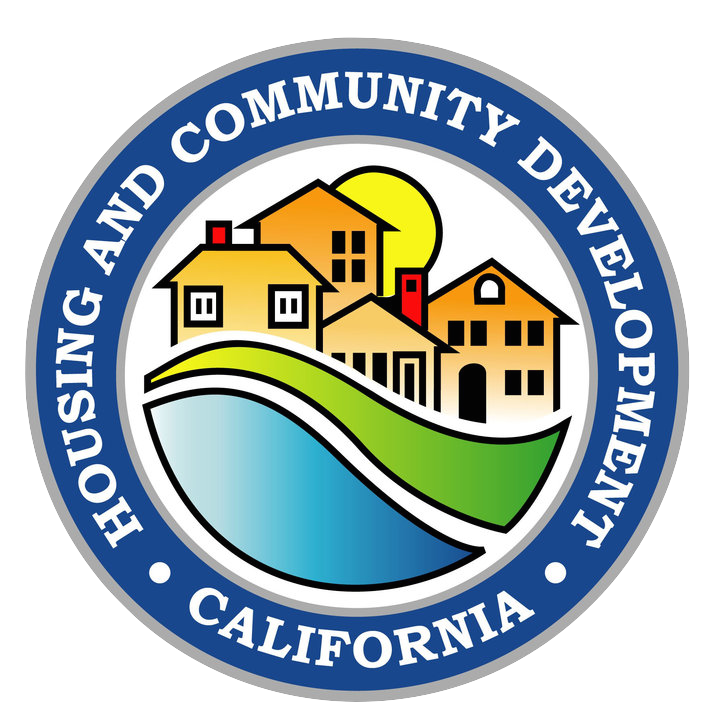

Department overview
- Formed: September 17, 1965; 60 years ago
- Jurisdiction: Government of California
- Headquarters: 651 Bannon Street Sacramento, CA
- Department executive: Gustavo Velasquez, Director
- Parent Department: California Housing and Homelessness Agency
- Website: hcd.ca.gov

The California Department of Housing and Community Development (HCD) is a department within the California Housing and Homelessness Agency (CHHA) that develops housing policy and building codes (i.e. the California Building Standards Code), regulates manufactured homes and mobile home parks, oversees housing plans of local governments, and administers housing finance, economic development and community development programs.

== History ==
The HCD was created on 17 September 1965. The Zenovich–Moscone–Chacon Housing and Home Finance Act of 1975 permanently established and reorganized the HCD, as well as created the California Housing Finance Agency. It inherited the housing portion of the Division of Immigration and Housing of the Californian Department of Industrial Relations. The HCD was brought under the BCSH in 2012.

In 2025, as part of the reorganization of the BCSH within the budget, Governor Gavin Newsom proposed spinning off the Department, along with other housing-related agencies in the BCSH, into a separate cabinet-level California Housing and Homelessness Agency. The proposal was approved by the Little Hoover Commission, and became active on July 1, 2026.

== Structure ==
In addition to the California Housing Finance Agency, the Department is assisted by a Disability Advisory Committee.

== Programs ==
=== Funding and housing management ===
The HCD Housing Assistance Program (HAP) acts as the local housing authority for 12 rural counties: Alpine, Amador, Calaveras, Colusa, Glenn, Inyo, Modoc, Mono, Sierra, Siskiyou, Trinity, and Tuolumne. One of the primary purposes of housing authorities is to manage Section 8 housing, but other activities include Community Development Block Grant (CDBG) entitlements and HOME Investment Partnerships Program (HOME) funding. The HCD has administered CDBG program for non-entitlement cities and counties (cities and counties under a specified population level that do not automatically receive CDBG funds directly from the federal government) since 1983, and administers HOME funding for cities and counties that do not receive HOME allocations directly from the federal government since the Cranston-Gonzalez National Affordable Housing Act of 1990.

=== CalHome Program ===
The department administers the CalHome Program, which provides grants to local public agencies and nonprofit corporations that operate first-time homebuyer assistance and owner-occupied rehabilitation programs for low- and very low-income households. State guidance describes the program’s purpose as supporting existing homeownership programs, increasing homeownership, encouraging neighborhood revitalization and sustainable development, and maximizing the use of existing housing stock.

CalHome funds are distributed through competitive Notices of Funding Availability (NOFAs) and used locally for deferred-payment loans or grants for down-payment and closing-cost assistance, rehabilitation of owner-occupied homes, and replacement of manufactured housing. Advocacy organizations such as Habitat for Humanity California and the CalHome Coalition have described the program as a key state funding source for affordable homeownership and aging-in-place repairs and have noted that demand for CalHome funding in recent rounds has substantially exceeded available resources.

=== Streamlining of zoning reform ===
Since the passage of AB 2853 in 1980, the HCD has been empowered to review housing elements drafted by each region's Council of Governments through the Regional Housing Needs Assessment (RHNA), which must be adopted by the jurisdiction which is then responsible for ensuring there are enough sites and proper zoning to accommodate its RHNA allocation.

Several state laws have been passed since 2016 to streamline the construction of housing statewide, many of which have increased the enforcement authority of the HCD to notify the California Department of Justice regarding violations of said laws by local governments. Under AB 72 (2017), the HCD is also authorized to decertify a local government's noncompliant housing element, which triggers the HAA's "Builder's remedy" until the local government enacts a compliant housing element.

In addition, following the 2024 passage of SB 1037, the Attorney General may also levy a fine of $10,000-$50,000 per month upon the offending local government until the HCD finds the local government in compliance. Another law, AB 2023 (2024), places the legal burden of proof onto local governments to defend their housing plans if they seek judicial relief from HCD’s designation of their housing element to be noncompliant.

As of 2024, the HCD is required to notify the Attorney General and an offending local agency of that local agency's violation of any of the following laws:

- Housing Element Law
- HAA (1982)
- State Density Bonus Law (1979)
- fair housing law (Section 65008 of the Government Code)
- the "no net loss" requirements for replacing housing element sites that are not developed as projected (Section 65863 of the Government Code).
- Permit Streamlining Act (1977)
- Surplus Lands Act (1968)
- The Rental Inclusionary Zoning policies of AB 1505 (2017)
- SB 35 (2017)
- SB 330 (2019)
- AB 2011 (2022)
- HOME Act (SB 9, 2021) projects concerning ministerial processing of lot splits in single-family residential zones, along with the streamlining of projects which fall under the
- ADU law
- SB 6 (2022)
- SB 4 (2023)
- SB 684 (2023)
- AB 1218 (2023)
- Housing Crisis Act (2019)
- AFFH policies (AB 686, 2018)
- Permanent Supportive Housing streamlining (AB 2162, 2018)
- Low Barrier Navigation Center streamlining (AB 101, 2019)
- Abundant and Affordable Homes Near Transit Act (Sb 79, 2025)

== Directors ==
- Arnold Sternberg (1974-1977)
- Ian Donald Terner (1978-1983)
- Susan A. DeSantis (1984-1986)
- Christine Diemer Reed (1986-1989)
- Maureen Higgins (1989-1991)
- Timothy Coyle (1991-1995)
- Richard Mallory (1997-1998)
- Julie I. Bornstein (1999-2002)
- Matthew O. Franklin (2003-2004)
- Lucy Dunn (2004-2005)
- Judy Nevis (acting 2005-2006)
- Lynn L. Jacobs (2006-2010)
- Cathy E. Creswell (acting 2011-2012)
- Linn Warren (2012-2013)
- Claudia Cappio (2014-2015)
- Susan Lea Riggs (acting 2015)
- Ben Metcalf (2016-2019)
- Gustavo Velasquez (2020-present)

== See also ==
- United States Department of Housing and Urban Development
- California Housing Finance Agency
