= California YIMBY =

American housing advocacy group

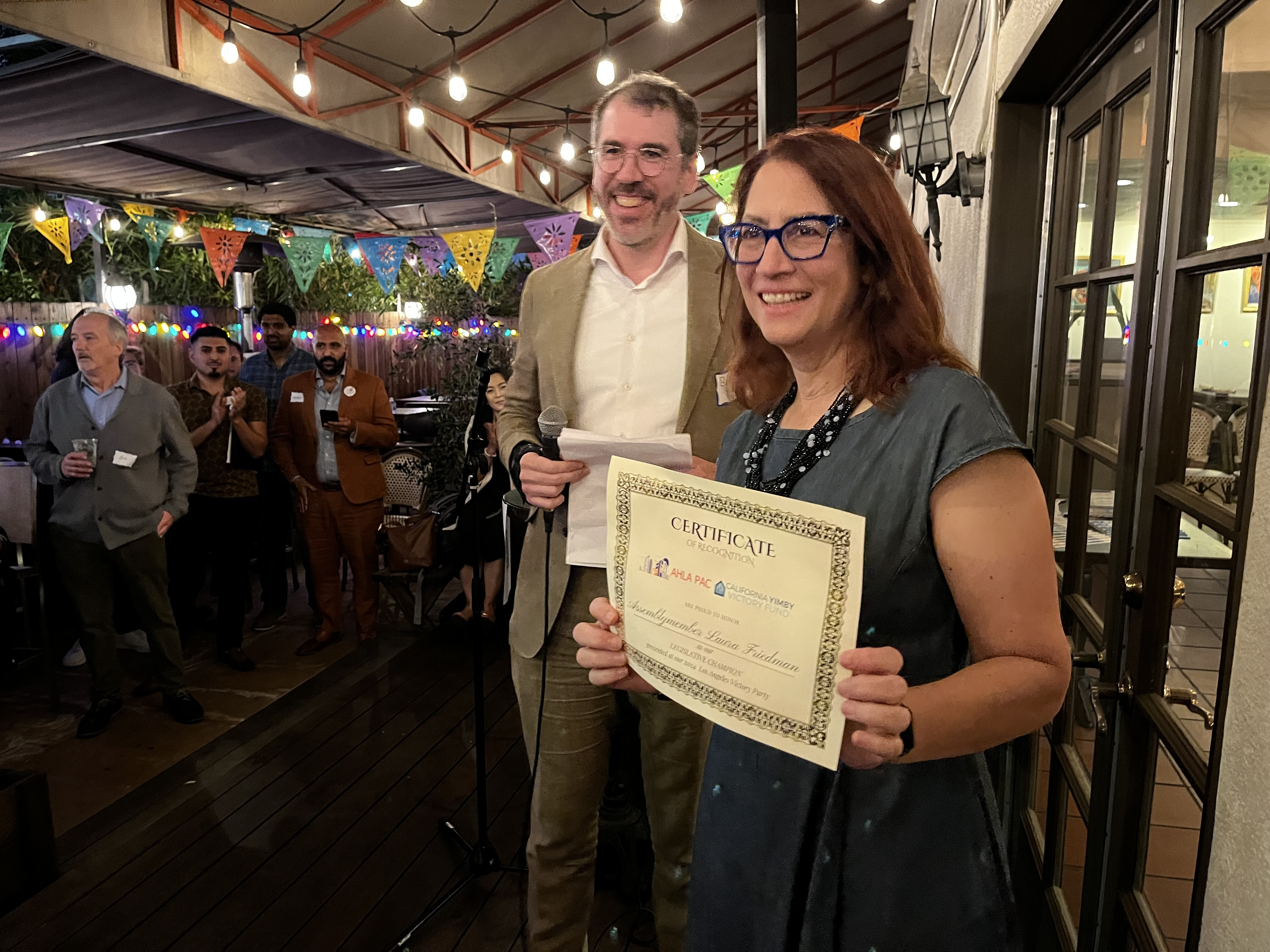
- US Rep. Laura Friedman receives award from Brian Hanlon, CEO, California YIMBY
- Formation: 2017
- Purpose: housing advocacy
- Location: Sacramento, California, US
- Region served: California
- Website: cayimby.org

California YIMBY (Yes in my Back Yard) is a 501(c)(4) nonprofit advocacy organization based in California, United States. It was founded in 2017 with the purpose of lobbying for housing reform in California to spur development. The organization has supported several high-profile California bills on zoning and development, including California Senate Bill 79, and a reform of the 1970 California Environmental Quality Act, known as CEQA.

The organization is part of the abundance movement and is often aligned with California state senator Scott Wiener.

== History ==
California YIMBY was established in 2017. It emerged from the broader YIMBY ("yes in my backyard") movement, which advocates for the development of more housing to address affordability issues. It was one of several YIMBY groups to form in California in response to the state's housing crisis, with high costs and limited availability.

California YIMBY was cofounded by activist Brian Hanlon and Pantheon Systems CEO Zack Rosen, with support from Nat Friedman, then of Microsoft. Hanlon had volunteered with the San Francisco Bay Area Renters' Federation before co-founding the California Renters Legal Advocacy Fund (CaRLA) in 2015. CaRLA lost a lawsuit against the city of Lafayette regarding the California Housing Accountability Act, which led Hanlon to become interested in legislative change. Hanlon had a "vision of a new housing advocacy organization for the state that would work on new policy, build coalitions and a grassroots movement, and massively scale up homebuilding". They raised initial funding of $500,000. By March 2018, the organization had raised over $1 million, primarily from the technology sector.

== Operations and advocacy ==
California YIMBY is headquartered in Sacramento, California. The organization operates as a 501(c)(3) and a 501(c)(4) nonprofit, with one arm focused on education and the other on lobbying. Its mission is to "make California an affordable place to live, work, and raise a family by advocating for policies that increase the supply of housing at all income levels". As of 2022, it had 80,000 members.

One of the organization's first legislative efforts was support SB 167, which addressed shortcomings in the California Housing Accountability Act. In 2018 California YIMBY supported California Senate Bill 827, introduced by Scott Wiener and drafted by Hanlon, which would have supported increased housing in the vicinity of public transportation stops. The bill was highly controversial and ultimately failed. It also supported California Senate Bill 50, a revision of 827, which saw "significant opposition" and was defeated in 2020. Another revision supported by California YIMBY, California Senate Bill 79, was also controversial; however, it ultimately passed and was signed into law by Governor Gavin Newsom in 2025.

The organization also supported several pieces of legislation intended to increase development of accessory dwelling units (ADUs). These include ABs 68 and 881, which removed local zoning barriers to ADUs; AB 976, which bars requirements that owners live in their ADUs; and AB 2221, which allowed simultaneous construction of ADUs and multifamily housing. In 2024, California YIMBY supported SB 1211, which allowed up to eight ADUs per property.

California YIMBY co-sponsored a 2022 bill (AB 2097) to reduce parking mandates, which require a minimum number of parking spaces for new developments and therefore increase development costs. Other legislation supported by California YIMBY has included bills intended to streamline approval of housing development projects; increase the stock of missing middle housing; and facilitate the construction of student and faculty housing for state universities and colleges. It also supported the East Solano Plan to develop a new planned city, which prompted controversy among YIMBY movement participants. In addition to lobbying, the organization has endorsed political candidacies and operates a political action committee called the California YIMBY Victory Fund.

California YIMBY Education Fund has commissioned a number of reports relating to housing, including on impact fees and Housing First.

== Impact ==
Bill 79 and AB 130's pro-housing reforms to the California Environmental Quality Act (CEQA), a founding goal of California YIMBY, were touted as major victories for the YIMBY movement. According to Fast Company, "In L.A., alone, by one estimate, [Bill 79] will eventually zone for 1.46 million new housing units." The changes to CEQA were "the biggest since the mid-1970s", as previous amendments had largely been "piecemeal".

California YIMBY has had a significant impact on ADU legislation. ADUs represented over 10% of housing units built in California between 2018 and 2024, with Los Angeles issuing 5000 permits annually as of 2021.

According to Mother Jones, AB 2097's ban on parking mandates near public transit had the effect of "eliminating parking minimums in large swaths of California's cities".
