= California Assembly Bill 2097 (2022) =

Urban planning policy in the United States

California State Legislature
- Full name: An act to amend Section 65585 of, and to add Section 65863.2 to, the Government Code, relating to land use.
- Introduced: February 14, 2022
- Assembly voted: September 29, 2022
- Senate voted: September 30, 2022
- Signed into law: September 22, 2022
- Sponsor(s): Friedman (A), Portantino (S), Wiener (S), Haney (A), Lee (A), Skinner (S), Ward (A)
- Governor: Gavin Newsom
- Code: Government Code
- Bill: California Assembly Bill 2097
- Associated bills: California Density Bonus Law, California HOME Act, CEQA, HAA, the ADU law, the Affordable Housing and High Road Jobs Act, Affordable Housing on Faith and Higher Education Lands Act, AB 2553 (2024), AB 2712 (2024)
- Website: https://leginfo.legislature.ca.gov/faces/billNavClient.xhtml?bill_id=202120220AB2097

Status: Current legislation

California Assembly Bill 2097 (AB 2097) is a 2022 California statute which prohibits California cities and other public agencies from mandating parking for most development projects within 0.5 miles (0.8 km) of a major transit stop. The law also establishes a "substantial hardship exception" which allows a public agency to impose a parking mandate within 0.5 miles of a major transit stop if the agency submits an application with evidence of a negative impact upon either the agency's ability to meet its RHNA obligations for low and very low income residents, disabled and elderly residents, or existing residential or commercial parking within 0.5 miles of a housing development project.

== Legislative history ==
=== Earlier law ===
An earlier law, AB 744 (drafted by Ed Chau, signed by Jerry Brown in 2015), allowed for developers of certain types of affordable housing (housing for seniors, housing for special needs populations, housing for low-income and very-low income people, and mixed-income developments that include a minimum number of affordable units) to build less parking units than required by local zoning regulations upon request by the developer, unless the city demonstrates a need to require mandatory parking.

=== Current law ===
The law was drafted by Laura Friedman, and emanated from portions of California Senate Bill 50, an unsuccessful 2019 bill which would have both prohibited parking mandates within 0.5 miles of a major transit stop as well as mandated minimum four-plex residential zoning in the same locations.

Initially drafted as AB 1401 in 2021, the bill was passed by the Assembly but died in the Senate Appropriations Committee.

Refiled in 2022 as AB 2097, the bill was passed by both houses by August 30, 2022, and signed into law by Governor Gavin Newsom on September 22, 2022. Taking effect on January 1, 2023, California became the second state after Oregon to eliminate parking minimums near public transit.

== Impact ==
A 2025 study argued that the law was overly complex and ambiguous, allowing for broad interpretation of the law by local governments ranging from expansive interpretations (including citywide repeal) on one end to uses of loopholes to subvert the law on the other. The study described the law as an example of the differences in ease of state preemption of local governments when applied to land use compared to other applications of preemption.

== Related legislation ==
=== Amendments ===
On September 19, 2024, Newsom signed into law AB 2553, which expanded both the definition of "major transit stop" under the California Environmental Quality Act to service frequency of 20 minutes or less, as well as eligibility for reduced traffic impact fees under the Mitigation Fee Act from "transit station" to "major transit stop". Previously, CEQA defined "major transit stop" as the intersection of two or more major bus routes with service of 15 minutes or less during peak commute periods. By extension, AB 2553 expanded the number of locations prohibited from parking mandates under AB 2097. The law also impacts the definition of "major transit stop" for several other laws, including the California Density Bonus Law, California HOME Act, CEQA, California Housing Accountability Act, the ADU law, the Affordable Housing and High Road Jobs Act, and the Affordable Housing on Faith and Higher Education Lands Act of 2023 (SB 4, sometimes referred to as the "Yes in God's Backyard," or "YIGBY" legislation). In addition, it indirectly affects the definition of a "transit priority area" (TPA) as "an area within one-half mile of a major transit stop that is existing or planned" as per SB 743 (2013).

On September 22, 2024, Newsom signed AB 2712, also drafted by Friedman, into law, prohibiting the city of Los Angeles from issuing preferential parking permits to residents of new developments which are exempt from parking mandates under AB 2097 unless the city provides a written application for hardship.

=== Other parking reform legislation ===
- SB 35 (2017), SB 6 (2022): prohibits local governments from levying parking mandates upon SB 35 projects within a half-mile of either public transit, within an architecturally and historically significant historic district, within one block of a car share vehicle, or when on-street parking permits are required but not offered to the occupants of the development.
- AB 2011 (2022): prohibits most parking mandates, but does not preclude parking mandates for new multifamily residential or nonresidential development to provide bicycle parking, electric vehicle supply equipment installed parking spaces, or parking spaces that are accessible to persons with disabilities.
- California HOME Act (SB 9, 2021), SB 4 (2023): prohibit local governments from levying parking mandates upon SB 9 and SB 4 projects within a half-mile of either a high-quality transit corridor or a major transit stop, or within one block of a car share vehicle.
- AB 1308 (2023): prohibits local governments from increasing the minimum parking requirement that applies to a single-family residence as a condition of approval of a project to remodel, renovate, or add to a single-family residence, except in specified circumstances;
- AB 1317 (2023): requires the owner of qualifying residential property, as defined, that provides parking with the qualifying residential property to unbundle parking from the price of rent;
- AB 894 (2023): requires that public agencies allow underutilized parking spaces to be shared with other land uses and the public, and to count shared parking toward meeting parking requirements in specified circumstances.

== Compliance by cities ==
Several California cities have passed legislation to repeal parking mandates beyond the scope of AB 2097 and its amendments, both before and after AB 2097's passage:

=== San Francisco Bay Area ===
- San Francisco repealed parking mandates citywide (except for mortuaries) on December 18, 2018.
- Emeryville repealed parking mandates and instituted parking maximums in 2019.
- Berkeley, in January 2021, repealed parking mandates for all residential uses except for two hillside neighborhoods which have narrow streets.
- Alameda repealed parking minimums in November 2021.
- San Jose repealed parking mandates for all new housing developments in December 2022.
- Mountain View's City Council voted on November 12, 2024 to repeal parking mandates for housing developments in certain other areas slated for housing growth, as well as residential areas of mixed-use developments.

=== Elsewhere ===
- Sacramento repealed its remaining parking mandates citywide in January 2021.
- San Diego removed parking mandates for businesses in transit-priority areas and commercial neighborhoods in November 2021. A previous reform to parking in 2019, which stopped requiring parking for any housing near transit, density bonus projects and non-density bonus projects alike, was credited with a fivefold increase in the total number of homes permitted through San Diego's density bonus program.
- Culver City passed an ordinance abolishing parking mandates citywide in October 2022.

=== Proposed ===
- In June 2025, Los Angeles City Councilmembers Bob Blumenfield and Nithya Raman introduced a motion directing the Department of City Planning to study removing parking mandates citywide.
- On May 5, 2025, West Hollywood city council directed staff to prepare a Zone Text Amendment to eliminate parking mandates citywide. This will potentially be completed within 6 to 9 months.
