= Affordable Housing on Faith and Higher Education Lands Act =

2023 statute in California, US

California State Legislature
- Full name: Affordable Housing on Faith and Higher Education Lands Act
- Acronym: SB 4
- Nickname: Yes in God's Backyard (YIGBY)
- Introduced: 2023
- Signed into law: October 11, 2023
- Sponsor: Scott Wiener
- Governor: Gavin Newsom
- Bill: SB 4
- Associated bills: AB 1851, AB 434

Status: Current legislation

The Affordable Housing on Faith and Higher Education Lands Act (Senate Bill 4) is a 2023 California statute which makes it legal for faith-based institutions and non-profit colleges to build affordable, multi-family homes on lands they own by streamlining the permitting process and overriding local zoning restrictions.

The law also allows for ministerial, "by-right" approval of new projects, provided that the projects comply with all objective building standards and existing environmental regulations. The law also exempts SB 4 projects from some types of CEQA review, and prohibits local governments from levying parking mandates upon SB 4 projects within a half-mile of either a high-quality transit corridor or a major transit stop, or within one block of a car share vehicle.

The law mandates that workers on an SB 4 project with at least 10 homes must be paid a prevailing wage, while contractors for those SB 4 projects with at least 50 homes must offer apprentices employment and pay for health care for construction workers and their dependents.

The law is also described as the "Yes in God's Backyard" (YIGBY) law. The bill, which was authored by State Senator Scott Wiener, was signed into law by Governor Gavin Newsom on October 11, 2023.

== Background ==
The bill is part of a greater movement by faith communities in the U.S. to build affordable housing called "Yes, In God's Backyard." The movement has, in the past, struggled with getting past the red tape over adaptive reuse of their property, especially with city or local opposition. SB 4 is part of a series of California bill efforts since 2020 to make it easier for churches, as well as other faith communities and higher education institutions, to build on their lands, including an assembly bill (AB 1851) which reduced or eliminated parking requirements for such projects. A UC Berkeley study found that this law opens up about 170,000 acres of land (about half the size of Los Angeles) for potential affordable housing development across the state.

== Amendments ==
In 2023, Newsom signed AB 434, which empowers the Department of Housing and Community Development (HCD) to enforce the streamlining of HOME Act projects concerning ministerial processing of lot splits in single-family residential zones, along with the streamlining of projects which fall under the ADU law, SB 6 (2022), SB 4 (2023), SB 684 (2023) and AB 1218 (2023), and requires the department to notify both a local government and the Attorney General of the local government's specified violation of the aforementioned laws as well as need for enforcement.

== Related legislation ==
AB 1851 (Wicks), which was signed into law on September 28, 2020, allows faith-based organizations like churches and other places of worship to reduce or eliminate parking requirements when seeking to build affordable housing on land they own or lease. The law also allows faith-based organizations to build housing on their parking lots, and prohibits cities from requiring the replacement of those parking spaces.
