= Terner Center for Housing Innovation =

The Terner Center for Housing and Innovation is a policy and research organization based within the College of Environmental Design at University of California, Berkeley. It was established in 2015 to "formulate bold strategies to house families from all walks of life in vibrant, sustainable, and affordable homes and communities." It is largely focused on developing policies which address and relieve the housing shortage in California.

It is named after Ian Donald "Don" Terner, an architect who served as Director of the California Department of Housing and Community Development from 1978 to 1983 and was the founding president of the BRIDGE Housing Corporation at the time of his death in the 1996 Croatia USAF CT-43 crash.
