= Affordable Housing and High Road Jobs Act =

California land use law

California State Legislature
- Full name: An act to amend Sections 65400 and 65585 of, and to add and repeal Chapter 4.1 (commencing with Section 65912.100) of Division 1 of Title 7 of, the Government Code, relating to housing.
- Introduced: February 14, 2022
- Assembly voted: August 29, 2022
- Senate voted: August 29, 2022
- Signed into law: September 28, 2022
- Sponsor(s): Wicks (A) , Bloom (A) , Grayson (A) , Quirk (A) , Villapudua (A), Alvarez (A) , Berman (A) , Mike Fong (A) , Mayes (A) , Quirk (A) , Reyes (A) , Robert Rivas (A) , Blanca Rubio (A), Nielsen (S) , Wiener (S)
- Governor: Gavin Newsom
- Code: Government Code
- Bill: California Assembly Bill 2011
- Associated bills: California Density Bonus Law, California HOME Act, CEQA, HAA, the ADU law, Affordable Housing on Faith and Higher Education Lands Act, SB 6 (2022), AB 2243 (2024)
- Website: https://leginfo.legislature.ca.gov/faces/billNavClient.xhtml?bill_id=202120220AB2011

Status: Current legislation

The Affordable Housing and High Road Jobs Act of 2022 (AB 2011) is a California statute which allows for a CEQA-exempt, ministerial, by-right approval for affordable housing on commercially zoned lands, and also allows such approvals for mixed-income housing along commercial corridors, provided that such housing projects satisfy specific criteria of affordability, labor, and environment and pay prevailing wage. The bill was introduced by Assemblymember Buffy Wicks, was signed into law by Governor Gavin Newsom on September 28, 2022, and came into force on July 1, 2023.

Additionally AB 2011 contains a requirement for the use of apprenticeship programs that are approved by local governments. When these contracts are being accepted by contractors they will also be provided with health care expenditures. This being a new and more recent Bill studies will be conducted by the Department of Housing and Community Development which will be used to present to legislature on the effects and results of the additional housing developments.

It is considered as a companion bill to the Middle-Class Housing Act of 2022 (SB 6), which mandates that projects meeting SB 6 criteria (either a 100-percent residential project or a mixed-use project where at least 50 percent of the square footage is dedicated to residential uses) may invoke SB 35 and the Housing Accountability Act. SB 6 projects, unlike AB 2011 projects, are not CEQA-exempt but need not provide any affordable housing. SB 6 was also introduced by Wicks and signed into law by Newsom on the same day as AB 2011.

== Background ==
Housing is considered affordable if a household is spending 30% or less of their monthly income toward their rent or mortgage. Affordable housing is housing specifically allocated for individuals earning 80% or less of the area median income (AMI) of the region they reside in, and restricts their rent payment to 30% of their monthly income. Mixed-income housing is defined by Brophy and Smith as "a mix of subsidized and market-rate housing".

Commercially zoned property under this policy includes, "office, retail, or parking". Developers are able to use AB 2011 to develop residential units on commercially zoned property without the need for rezoning of a parcel, a lengthy process that can last several months. Additionally, this policy also allows for project exemption from CEQA, which is beneficial since exemption can expedite the development process exponentially. This is especially crucial for affordable housing developments, as CEQA is often weaponized by NIMBY's to thwart projects from reaching approval.

For mixed income projects, AB 2011 allows for the density of the project to be the maximum density allowed on the parcel, or the following, whichever is greater:

- 30 units per acre for sites of less than one acre in size;
- 40 units per acre for sites of one acre in size or greater located on a commercial corridor of less than 100 feet in width;
- 60 units per acre for sites of one acre in size or greater located on a commercial corridor of 100 feet in width or greater; or
- 80 units per acre for sites within one-half mile of a major transit stop (regardless of whether another previous condition applies).

In addition, the maximum height for an AB 2011 project shall be the maximum allowed on the parcel or the following, whichever is greater:

- 35 feet for sites on a commercial corridor of less than 100 feet in width;
- 45 feet for sites on a commercial corridor of 100 feet in width or greater; or
- 65 feet for sites that are within one-half mile of a major transit stop and not within a coastal zone.

=== AB 2011 Considerations with Affordable Housing ===
Although this policy will expedite the project approval process, requiring prevailing wage poses a major problem for 100% affordable housing developments (where all units are income restricted). The requirement of prevailing wages leads to complication in financing development, as prevailing wage potentially raises construction costs by up to 40%. This increase creates obstacles for the financial feasibility of affordable housing developments, as affordable housing financing is far more complex than market-rate housing. Funding involves hard loans from banks accompanied by multiple state and municipal grants, all of which are difficult to qualify for and obtain as there are many affordable housing developers competing for the same funds. When construction requires an affordable housing developer to pay prevailing wages, it becomes even more strenuous to finance the construction cost increase. This is because receiving funding awards from public subsidies is competitive and affordable housing developments generate a low rental cashflow every year because they charge low rents; hence, they are unable to support a larger loan payment. The requirement of prevailing wage for construction can potentially mean that the development is financially infeasible, and the affordable development may not move forward or may not proceed with approval under AB 2011.

== Amendments ==
=== AB 2243 (2024) ===
AB 2243, which was introduced by Wicks and signed into law by Newsom on September 19, 2024, amended both AB 2011 as well as SB 6. AB 2243 amended AB 2011 to allow eligibility for:

- mixed-income projects located within regional mall sites of less than 100 acres
- mixed-income projects located in narrower commercial corridors
- all AB 2011-compliant projects located within 500 feet of a freeway.

The law also set the height limit for AB 2011-covered housing between 35 feet on narrower roads to 65 feet near transit, with the ability to increase the height limit for affordable housing through the density bonus.

In addition, AB 2243 amended SB 6's requirement that SB 6-eligible projects may not exceed 20 acres, instead providing an exception for regional mall sites of less than 100 acres.

=== AB 2553 (2024) ===
On September 19, 2024, Newsom signed into law AB 2553, which expanded both the definition of "major transit stop" under the California Environmental Quality Act to service frequency of 20 minutes or less, as well as eligibility for reduced traffic impact fees under the Mitigation Fee Act from "transit station" to "major transit stop". This increased the applicability of AB 2011 and other laws making reference to major transit stops.
