= California Senate Bill 1534 (1982) =

Accessory dwelling unit statute

California Senate Bill 1534 (SB 1534, Government Code section 65852.2) is a 1982 California statute law which established statewide options for local governments to promote and regulate secondary suites, also known as "accessory dwelling units" (ADUs) in California. Under the law, local governments were allowed the following options:

- adopt their own local ADU ordinance to allow for ADU development;
- adopt no local ordinance and operate under state standards regarding ADUs;
- completely ban ADUs within jurisdictional limits, provided that they provide findings showing adverse effects of ADUs on health, safety, or general welfare.

The bill was drafted by Henry J. Mello, who described it as the "Granny housing bill", signed into law by Governor Jerry Brown in January 1983, and came into effect on July 1, 1983. In 1981, Mello drafted another law, SB 1160, which allowed zoning variances in R1 areas for ADUs and was geared toward seniors.

The law, which was passed by the legislature due to the perception that local governments would not resolve the statewide housing shortage on their own, was the first regulation of ADUs in the state for all ages. Due to the low-impact approach taken by the legislature at the time, the law did not have much initial effect upon the housing supply, and has been repeatedly amended since to increase housing supply, especially under Governor Gavin Newsom.

== Amendments ==
- AB 4343 (1986): increased the state minimum standards to allow for detached ADUs up to 640 square feet and for a 15 percent increase in floor area for attached ADUs;
- AB 3529 (1990): allowed for up to 1200 square foot detached ADUs, or a 30 percent increase in floor area for an attached ADU;
- AB 3198 (1994): limited local parking requirements to one space per ADU or per bedroom;
- AB 1866 (2002): required that all ADU permits be considered ministerially, without discretionary review or hearings;
- AB 2406, SB 1069 and AB 2299 (2016): reduce the cost and bureaucracy needed to construct an ADU (Accessory Dwelling Unit) by imposing a legal floor on local ordinances for the first time, setting a time limit for approval of compliant projects within 120 days, creating an "exemption ADU" category, and requiring that local utility fees must be proportional to the impact of the ADU;
- SB 229 and AB 494 (2017): allows for ADUs to be included in plans for new single-family homes;
- SB 13, AB 670, and AB 881 (2019): prohibited minimum lot requirements, lowered setback requirements, eliminated fire sprinkler requirements, prohibited owner occupancy requirements until 2025, limited review of ADU permits to 60 days, created a minimum ADU allowance, limited maximum ADU sizes, expanded the exemption ADU program, required HCD oversight of local ordinances, curtailed ADU limits by homeowner associations, eliminated or reduced local impact fees for ADUs under 750 square feet;
- AB 68 (2019): allows homeowners to designate up to 500 square feet (46 m^{2}) on a lot for construction as a "junior accessory dwelling unit" ("JADU"); some commentators stated that this amounted to legalization of de facto triplex zoning throughout the state.
- SB 9 (California HOME Act, 2021), creates a legal process by which owners of certain single-family homes may either build two 800-square-foot homes or one duplex on their property (including as an ADU), to result in a maximum of four housing units on a formerly single-family lot, and prohibits cities and counties from directly interfering with those who wish to build such homes;
- AB 1584 (2021): makes void any housing covenants that would prohibit the construction of an ADU in certain circumstances.
- SB 897 and AB 2221 (2022): both of which clarified rules regarding compliance of ADUs with building codes and streamlined permitting.
- AB 1033 (2023): allows homeowners to convert their ADUs into condominiums and sell their ADUs independently of the primary residence;
- AB 434 (2023): empowers the Department of Housing and Community Development (HCD) to enforce the aforementioned permitting laws for ADUs as well as SB 9, SB 6, SB 684 and other projects;
- AB 976 (2023): permanently prohibits all local governments from requiring owner occupancy for ADUs, allowing homeowners to rent out ADUs without living on the property themselves;
- AB 3057 (2024): which streamlines the approval process for the construction of ADUs by granted same exemption to environmental review for junior ADU ordinances as given to standard ADU ordinances;
- SB 450 (2024), which clarifies the intent and purpose of the law and allows state agencies to enforce the terms of the HOME Act in court against city governments which seek to undermine it;
- SB 1211 (2024), which allows people to build up to eight detached ADUs on a lot, expanding the maximum from two ADUs per lot;
- SB 1164 (2024), which allows new ADUs to be exempt from property taxes for up to 15 years;
- SB 9 (Arreguín, 2025), which would remove the occupancy requirement authorize the HCD to void any local ADU ordinances which violate state law and apply state ADU standards until the local government passes remedial measures;
- AB 1154 (Carrillo, 2025), which aligns standards for all ADUs under 500 square feet;
- AB 1061 (Quirk-Silva, 2025), allowing the HOME Act to be used in designated historic districts as long as an existing historic structure is not altered or demolished;
- AB 1308 (Hoover, 2025), establishing a 10-day period for inspecting small residential projects;
- AB 253 (Ward, 2025), allowing home builders to hire a licensed and certified third-party reviewer.

=== Proposed amendments ===
- AB 956 (Quirk-Silva, 2025-2026), would remove restriction limiting single-family homeowners to constructing only one detached ADU, would allow for construction of up to two detached ADUs when space permits while maintaining safety rules. The bill passed the Assembly in May 2025 but was designated a two-year bill to be heard in the Senate in March/April 2026.
- SB 1117 (Cervantes, 2026), would mandate local governments to switch from charging the full impact fee per square foot for any ADU above 750 square feet to charging proportionally for the square footage above 750 square feet.

== Impact ==
The ADU law was rarely used in California until after the passage of AB 2406, SB 1069 and AB 2299 in 2016. Statewide, the application rate increased from just under 10,000 ADU applications being filed in 2017 to nearly 30,000 being filed in 2021. The total number of permits issued each year increased by 15,334% from 2016 to 2022, with over 83,865 ADUs permitted. In addition, ADUs constituted around 19% of new housing units produced statewide as of 2022.

Of the cities, Los Angeles saw the most dramatic increase of ADU applications within the year following passage of the three bills in 2016, going from only 80 applications in 2016 to 1,980 applications by November 2017 (an increase of 2,375%) to 7,160 applications in 2022 (an increase of 8,850% since 2016). As of 2022, the Greater Los Angeles area remained the most popular site for permitting ADUs, followed by the San Francisco Bay Area and San Diego County.

The majority of ADUs constructed in California are used for housing, compared to only 8% being used for short-term rentals, according to a survey conducted by the Terner Center for Housing Innovation at University of California, Berkeley.
