= California HOME Act =

Government legislation

California State Legislature
- Full name: An act to amend Section 66452.6 of, and to add Sections 65852.21 and 66411.7 to, the Government Code, relating to land use.
- Nickname: California Housing Opportunity and More Efficiency (HOME) Act
- Introduced: December 7, 2020
- Assembly voted: August 26, 2021
- Senate voted: August 30, 2021
- Signed into law: September 16, 2021
- Effective date: January 1, 2022
- Sponsor(s): Sens. Toni Atkins, Anna Caballero, Susan Rubio, Scott Wiener, Dave Cortese, Lena Gonzalez, Mike McGuire; Assems. Robert A. Rivas, Buffy Wicks
- Governor: Gavin Newsom
- Code: Government Code
- Section: 66452.6, 66411.7, 65852.21
- Bill: Senate Bill 9
- Website: https://leginfo.legislature.ca.gov/faces/billTextClient.xhtml?bill_id=202120220SB9

Status: Current legislation

2021 California Senate Bill 9 (SB 9), titled the California Housing Opportunity and More Efficiency (HOME) Act, is a 2021 California state law which creates a legal process by which owners of certain single-family homes in single-family zoned areas may build duplexes or split homes on their property, and prohibits all cities and counties from directly interfering with those who wish to build such homes.

Initially, the law allowed property owners to either build two 800-square-foot homes or one duplex on their property, to result in a maximum of four housing units on a formerly single-family lot. The law has since been amended to, among other things, allow for the construction of up to eight detached ADUs on a single real property.

The bill was crafted to reduce the cost of housing in California by increasing housing supply and density within California cities and overriding municipal and county zoning laws requiring single-family zoning. The law also expands the capacity for secondary suites (also known in California as Accessory Dwelling Units - ADU's).

== Background ==
In 2016, California lawmakers removed local barriers to accessory dwelling unit (ADU) construction by passing Senate Bill 1069. This was later updated in 2017 with Senate Bill 229 and Assembly Bill 494. These bills modified single-family zoning throughout California by requiring speedy local approval of up to 1,200 square foot secondary units on all residential property in California, including land zoned for single-family homes. In 2019, the law was updated with Assembly Bill 68 to allow up to 500 of the 1,200 square feet to be designated a "junior accessory dwelling unit"; some commentators said this amounted to de facto triplex zoning throughout the state.

== Legislative history ==
Drafted by Weiner, the HOME Act was introduced on December 7, 2020, to the State Senate. After several amendments, the bill was passed 28–6 on May 20, 2021. The bill was sent to the Assembly, where it was further amended before passage 45–19 on August 26, 2021. After the Senate concurred with the Assembly's amendments 28–7 on August 30, SB 9 was signed into law by Governor Gavin Newsom in September 2021, and went into effect on January 1, 2022.

== Provisions ==
As originally written, the HOME Act requires ministerial approval of housing development projects which involve either the building of no more than two 800-square-foot primary units in a single-family zone, the subdivision of a parcel in a single-family zone into two parcels, or both. The law allows for the creation of up to four housing units on a lot area which was originally zoned or intended for single-family use. The law requires local governments to modify or eliminate objective development standards on a project-by-project basis if they would interfere with construction of am otherwise-eligible SB 9 project. The law allows local governments to impose off-street parking of up to one space per unit for an SB 9 project, but akin to AB 2097 (2022), prohibits parking mandates for SB 9 projects within a half-mile of either a high-quality transit corridor or a major transit stop.

In addition, the law contains provisions addressing environmental site constraints, protections against the displacement of existing tenants, and protection of historic structures and districts. Finally, the law requires the homeowner to sign an affidavit stating their intent to occupy one of the SB 9-applicable units as their primary residence for a minimum of three years.

The HOME Act is differentiated from the ADU law in that the HOME Act applies primarily to "primary units" (typically a single-family residence or a residential unit within a multi-family residential development, such as a single-family house, a duplex or more), although ADUs and JADUs can be built on a HOME Act project provided that the total number of dwellings does not exceed the amount allowed under the HOME Act.

== Impact ==
Prior to passage, it was estimated by the Terner Center for Housing Innovation at University of California, Berkeley that around 500,000 (1 in 20) households across California would be able to qualify under SB 9. The law also had several exceptions, including the exclusion of historic districts, and a condition prohibiting the same owner from splitting adjacent lots.

A study by the Terner Center conducted one year after the law took effect found that the law as passed was rarely used among 13 cities surveyed, with prospective homeowners usually opting to use the stronger protections of the ADU law instead. In addition, multiple local governments had passed ordinances to reduce usage of the HOME Act. For example, the city of Los Angeles only received 211 applications for new SB 9 units in 2022, approved only 38 of those applications, and approved none of the 28 applications for lot splits. The author of the study recommended changes to the HOME Act, including more prescriptive land use and zoning standards, more flexible local SB 9 ordinances, and addressing homeownership barriers.

By May 2024, only fewer than 500 homeowners had successfully applied for lot splits or new units under SB 9, and only dozens of SB 9 projects had been completed, according to The Wall Street Journal citing state data. However, in its 2024 housing element progress report as submitted to the state government, the city government of Los Angeles reported that 569 duplexes in single-family zones and 4 residential lot splits were permitted by the city under the HOME Act.

== Subsequent litigation and legislation ==
=== Amendments ===
The HOME Act was passed alongside SB 10, another bill authored by Weiner, which authorizes a local government to adopt an ordinance to zone any parcel for up to 10 units of residential density per parcel, at a height specified in the ordinance, if the parcel is located in a transit-rich area or an urban infill site, and exempts such projects from CEQA review. Additionally, SB 10 allows local governments to overrule local propositions regarding zoning laws. SB 10 is set to expire in 2029.

==== 2023 ====
In 2023, Newsom signed AB 434, which empowers the Department of Housing and Community Development (HCD) to enforce the streamlining of HOME Act projects concerning ministerial processing of lot splits in single-family residential zones, along with the streamlining of projects which fall under the ADU law, SB 6 (2022), SB 4 (2023), SB 684 (2023) and AB 1218 (2023), and requires the department to notify both a local government and the Attorney General of the local government's specified violation of the aforementioned laws as well as need for enforcement.

==== 2024 ====
To strengthen the HOME Act, Newsom signed more bills on September 19, 2024:

- SB 450, which clarifies the intent and purpose of the law, limits the design and zoning standards cities can impose on SB 9 projects (prohibiting local governments from assigning objective zoning, subdivision, or design standards to SB 9 projects which do not apply to single-unit zoned areas; prohibiting local governments from denying lot split applications based on the impact on the local physical environment), limits the time period for cities to delay SB 9 applications for review to 60 days maximum, and adds SB 9 to the list of laws which the Department of Housing and Community Development can oversee and enforce in court against city governments which are found to be in non-compliance;
- SB 1211, which allows people to build up to eight detached ADUs on a lot (provided that the number of detached units do not exceed the number of existing units on the property), expanding the maximum from two ADUs per lot, and allows ADUs to be built on existing parking spaces (covered or uncovered) without requiring those spots to be replaced;
- SB 1164, which allows new ADUs to be exempt from property taxes for up to 15 years.

==== 2025 ====
AB 1061, authored by Sharon Quirk-Silva, would allow the HOME Act to be used in designated historic districts as long as an existing historic structure is not altered or demolished. The bill was passed by the Assembly 45–14, and was passed by the Senate 23–10 with amendments. After concurrence by the Assembly 46–18, the bill signed by the Governor on October 10, 2025.

==== 2026 ====
AB 2005, authored by Patrick Ahrens, would shift the HOME Act's owner-occupancy requirement from the applicant to a homebuyer, while requiring the owner to occupy one of the units for at least three years. The bill was passed by the Assembly on May 14, 2026, and awaits consideration in the Senate.

=== Litigation ===
The AIDS Healthcare Foundation and the city of Redondo Beach sued against SB 10 on constitutional grounds, alleging that the law's grant for local governments to overrule local propositions violates the state constitution. The Los Angeles County Superior Court ruled against the plaintiffs on May 12, 2022, and the ruling was sustained by the California Second District Court of Appeal on March 28, 2024.

After several charter cities sued in state court to block the enforcement of the HOME Act, on April 25, 2024, Los Angeles County Superior Court judge Curtis Kin ruled against the constitutionality of the HOME Act in Redondo Beach, Whittier, Carson, Del Mar and Torrance, stating that the law did not specifically require property owners in charter cities to build below-market-rate, deed-restricted housing, and that the legislature had to demonstrate that the law addresses a statewide concern when applied to charter cities.

== Related legislation ==
=== Starter Home Revitalization Act (AB 803) ===
The SHRA, authored by Tasha Boerner and signed into law on August 31, 2021, requires local governments approve an application to subdivide a lot (up to five acres) zoned for multifamily housing into smaller lots for single-family homes if it meets specific criteria. The SHRA was amended in 2023 (SB 684) to ministerially approve subdivision maps associated with a housing development project of 10 or fewer units, as well as to apply the amended SHRA to multi-family zoned housing. A further 2024 amendment (SB 1123) expanded application of the SHRA to vacant lots zoned for single-family housing. Both SB 684 and SB 1123 were authored by Anna Caballero.

=== Abundant and Affordable Housing Near Transit Act (SB 79) ===
In 2018, State Senator Scott Wiener introduced SB 827, which, in addition to reforming zoning near "transit-rich" areas, would also legalize the construction of four-plex multi-family housing statewide, even in single-family zoned areas. A revision of the bill, SB 50, was defeated in a 2020 floor vote after opposition by several municipal governments. SB 79, a significantly revised version of SB 50 which was also authored by Wiener and would legalize the construction of 4-9 story apartment buildings near transit stations in dense counties, was passed and signed into law on October 10, 2025, despite municipal opposition.

== See also ==
- YIMBY movement – Movement in support of infrastructure development
- California housing shortage
- California Housing Accountability Act
- California Senate Bill 50, 2019 bill drafted by Weiner which would have legalized construction of up to four units of multi-family housing statewide and preempted local government control of land zoning near public transit stations and jobs centers
