= Builder's remedy =

Legal process used in the United States

The builder's remedy is a legal mechanism in the United States that can be used in certain states to expedite the construction of low or middle income housing when a municipality fails to comply with laws related to housing development. Typically, where a municipality fails to comply with state laws regarding the development of new housing, the builder's remedy either allows a developer to bypass or ignore nearly all of the municipality's zoning laws and begin construction on a development in an expedited manner or provides the developer with a legal remedy that can be enforced in court or through an administrative process. Builder's remedy projects are increasingly common in California, where new state laws have been passed to force local municipalities to approve additional housing to address the ongoing California housing shortage. Massachusetts and New Jersey also employ a form of the builder's remedy as well.

== Background ==
Beginning in the 1970s and 1980s, residents in certain communities began opposing new housing developments. These residents, often referred to as NIMBYs, argued that construction of new housing would change the character of existing neighborhoods, overburden existing infrastructure, and/or negatively impact the value of existing homes. In response to these concerns, local politicians in these communities would often use local zoning laws to block or delay the construction of new housing in an effort to appease existing residents. However, in blocking or delaying the construction of new housing, these efforts often resulted in a shortage of housing, prompting state-level politicians to seek remedies that would increase the overall supply of housing.

== California ==
In 1990, California amended the Housing Accountability Act (HAA, passed a decade before that) which created the state's builder's remedy process. Under the HAA, if a local municipality is not in compliance with California's housing development goals, developers are authorized to bypass that municipality's zoning laws so long as the new housing development contains at least 20% low-income housing or 100% middle-income housing.

Despite high hopes for the HAA, initial adoption of the builder's remedy was limited. In the late 2010s however, California passed a series of housing laws, including the Housing Crisis Act of 2019 (SB 330), intended to increase the use of the builder's remedy and provide greater impact to pro-housing laws such as the HAA.

By the early 2020s, multiple large municipalities in California found themselves out of compliance with California's housing development goals. For the first time, developers began using the builder's remedy to seek approval of numerous new housing developments. First example of using Builder's Remedy can be seen in Los Angeles where a developer filed for a Builder's Remedy project to build 40 townhomes in June 2022 when the City of Los Angeles failed the compliance of Housing Element. Similarly, Santa Monica failed to pass a compliant housing development plan, developers employed the builder's remedy to move forward with the construction of approximately 4,000 new housing units spread across 12 new development sites. Likewise, after initially being blocked by the City of Redondo Beach, developers there took advantage of the builder's remedy to move forward with the construction of approximately 2,300 new housing units. After Palo Alto failed to meet a deadline for passing a compliant housing development plan, developers there announced that they would also be moving forward with new projects without seeking further approvals from local authorities.

== New Jersey ==
In 1975, the New Jersey Supreme Court held that municipalities in the state had an obligation under the New Jersey State Constitution to provide for realistic opportunities for the construction of affordable housing in their community. In furtherance of this obligation, where a municipality fails to allow such realistic opportunities, an interested developer can file a lawsuit against the municipality seeking authorization to proceed with their intended development without regard to any local zoning rules that might prohibit or impede the construction.

== Massachusetts ==
In 1969, Massachusetts passed the Low and Moderate Income Housing Act, which created that state's builder's remedy. Referred to as "Chapter 40B", this law entitles developers of low-income housing to an expedited review period before any local zoning authorities. In the event the developer's application is denied by the local zoning authority, the law allows the developer to appeal the ruling to a state-level board that can reverse the local zoning authority's determination.

== See also ==
- Inclusionary zoning
