= California Housing Accountability Act =

1982 California state law

The Housing Accountability Act (HAA) is a California state law designed to promote infill development by speeding housing approvals. The Act was passed in 1982 in recognition that "the lack of housing, including emergency shelter, is a critical statewide problem," and has also been referred to as "the anti-NIMBY law." It empowers the State of California to limit the ability of local government to restrict the development of new housing, and legalizes the Builder's remedy process to ameliorate violations of the law by local governments. The Act was strengthened by subsequent amendments in 1990, 2017 and 2024.

== Purpose and procedural mandates ==
The Act applies to housing applications to local agencies within the State of California that meet the following criteria:

- Meet a city's "objective general plan and zoning standards," e.g. the local zoning rules. A developer cannot use the HAA to build a 6-story building in an area that is zoned for 3 story buildings.
- The development would not cause a "specific, adverse impact" to public health, or take water from bordering farms or preserved resources.
- The development meets the standards of the California Environmental Quality Act and the California Coastal Act.

If an application meets these criteria, the relevant city council or planning commission must vote to approve the application and provide necessary permits within 90 to 180 days, with the shorter deadline for projects that include affordable housing and/or government funding. If the city votes to decline the application it must make a written finding specifying the section of the HAA the application violates. The city is also forbidden from proposing modifications that would reduce the number of units to be developed, or passing zoning rules that would retroactively make the application non compliant.

In particular, the "objective general plan and zoning standards" rule prohibits a city from rejecting projects for arbitrary reasons like "it does not fit with the neighborhood character," unless "neighborhood character" has been defined previously in the design guidelines or zoning code in some objective way, such as "all buildings on the block must be painted tan or gray, and have a Spanish tile roof."

The act is enforced by the California Department of Housing and Community Development.

== Amendments to the HAA ==
=== 1990 and 1992 amendments ===
SB 2011, signed into law by Governor George Deukmejian in 1990, amended the HAA to provide additional protection to affordable housing projects, including the builder’s remedy and savings clause. Another amendment, SB 1711 (1992), tightened the grounds for denial of a project.

=== 2004 and 2005 amendments ===
AB 2348 (signed by Arnold Schwarzenegger in 2004), clarified the land inventory requirements but removed the language that tethered the use of the savings clause to a city’s prior adoption of a housing element. SB 1711 (2005) was intended to close further loopholes in the HAA.

=== 2017 amendments ===
The California State Legislature passed several amendments, in 2016 and 2017, which modified the HAA to update its findings about the state housing shortage, and to strengthen its enforcement powers. The amended Act mandates that judges award attorneys fees to successful petitioners under the Act. In addition, judges would have the power to fine cities found in violation of the HAA. Both SB 167 and AB 72, which empowers the HCD to enforce the HAA, were signed into law by Governor Jerry Brown on September 29, 2017.

=== 2024 amendments ===
The Legislature passed several amendments in 2024, including AB 1893, to modify and streamline the HAA for Builder's Remedy projects. AB 1893 ends the "free-for-all" approach to Builder's Remedy, instead applying site restrictions, density limits, certain objective local standards and other mandated requirements to new projects after January 1, 2025. In turn, AB 1893 eases certain affordability requirements and offers more explicit legal protections for Builder's Remedy projects against opponents' tactics, and establishes the Builder's Remedy as a consequence of local governments violating existing state housing law when interfering with otherwise legal housing projects. Previously-approved Builders' Remedy projects are allowed to stand or to convert to AB 1893 standards. AB 1886 was also passed by the Legislature in order to foreclose several legal arguments used in state court by opponents of Builder's Remedy projects. AB 1893 and AB 1886 were both signed into law by Gavin Newsom on September 19, 2024.

== Proposed amendments ==
- SB 677 (Wiener, 2026) would amend the HAA to treat bond endorsement failure as a formal project disapproval, as well as ban third-party appeals of both subdivision maps for urban infill housing as well as approval of federal financing for affordable housing. The bill was gutted and amended twice to replace language relating to SB 9, SB 35 and SB 79.

== Litigation involving the HAA ==
A number of lawsuits have been filed in recent years alleging violations of the HAA. The cases have helped establish conditions where the HAA does and does not apply.

=== Sequoyah Hills Homeowners Assn. v. City of Oakland 1993 ===
WPN, a developer, wanted to build a project in the Oakland Hills. The City of Oakland completed an environmental impact report, which certified several different options: one with 63 units, one with 45 homes, and one with 36 homes on wider lots. A number of nearby residents were vehemently opposed to the project. In 1991, the City approved the option with 45 homes. In particular, the City found that the HAA prevented them from asking the developer to reduce the number of units on the lot. A neighborhood homeowners association sued the city. The judge ruled in favor of the city, confirming their judgment that they could not legally ask the developer to reduce the number of units.

=== Honchariw v. County of Stanislaus 2011 ===
Nicholas Honchariw, a developer, wanted to build 8 market-rate homes on a plot of 33 acres in Stanislaus County. The county initially rejected the application, arguing that the plot did not meet the county's requirement that every subdivision have a public water connection. The developer filed a lawsuit, arguing that some of the units had public water connections, and that he planned to create the necessary connections for the other units. In November 2011, an appeals court ruled in the developer's favor, saying the County's logic to deny subdivisions was circular: subdivisions could not be found in violation of the county ordinance until they had been created, and this could not be used as a valid reason to deny the subdivision approvals. The ruling also set a precedent that the HAA also applies to 100% market rate developments.

=== Eden Housing, Inc. v. Town of Los Gatos 2017 ===
In September 2016 the city of Los Gatos voted 3-2 to reject an application to develop the North 40, a plot of land then mostly orchard. Council members who voted 'No' stated that the proposal did not fit with the city's Specific Plan. The developers sued, arguing that the city's rejection violated the HAA. In June 2017, a judge of the Superior Court of Santa Clara County ordered the city to reconsider the developer's proposal in accordance with the objective standards mandated by the HAA. In August 2017, the City Council voted to approve the project.

=== SFBARF v. City of Berkeley 2017 ===
In April 2015, a developer submitted an application to tear down a dilapidated building at 1310 Haskell Street in Berkeley, and replace it with three two-story homes. In July 2016, the Berkeley City Council voted 5-0 (with 4 abstentions) to deny the proposal. The city was sued by the SF Bay Area Renters Federation, who argued that denying the application violated the HAA. In October 2016, the city settled the lawsuit by agreeing to reconsider the proposal.

In July 2017, the judge ruled in favor of SFBARF. In September 2017, the Berkeley City Council voted to approve the project and settle the lawsuit.

=== CaRLA v. City of San Mateo 2021 ===
In 2015, a developer submitted an application to build a four-story, ten-unit multifamily residential building in San Mateo, California. The Planning Commission determined that the application was consistent with the city's general plan and design guidelines, and recommended that the Planning Commission approve the plan. As some residents opposed the project, the Planning Commission denied the project on October 10, 2017 on grounds that design guidelines required a "transition or step in height" between the two-story adjacent building and the four stories in the project proposal. After the City Council denied the appeal, appellants went to court on grounds that the denial violated the HAA.

The trial court denied the petition, finding that the design guidelines were objective standards for the purposes of the HAA. The trial court further concluded that portions of the HAA violated the Constitution of California.

The First District Court of Appeal reversed the trial court ruling, finding that the design guidelines around height were not objective for the purposes of the HAA. The court also affirmed the constitutionality of the HAA. The City of San Mateo settled with appellants, agreeing not to appeal the ruling, and to pay $450,000 in attorney fees to California Renters Legal Advocacy & Education Fund.

The San Mateo City Council reconsidered the project on February 7, 2022.

== See also ==
- California HOME Act
- Regional Housing Needs Assessment
