= California Senate Bill 35 (2017) =

Affordable housing streamlining law

California State Legislature
- Full name: An act to amend Sections 65400 and 65582.1 of, and to add and repeal Section 65913.4 of, the Government Code, relating to housing.
- Introduced: December 15, 2016
- Assembly voted: September 15, 2017
- Senate voted: September 15, 2017
- Signed into law: September 29, 2017
- Sponsor: Scott Wiener
- Governor: Jerry Brown
- Code: Government Code
- Bill: California Senate Bill 35
- Website: https://leginfo.legislature.ca.gov/faces/billTextClient.xhtml?bill_id=201720180SB35

Status: Current legislation

California Senate Bill 35 (SB 35) is a statute streamlining housing construction in California counties and cities that fail to build enough housing to meet state mandated housing construction requirements, and exempts construction under the law from California Environmental Quality Act review. The bill was introduced to the California State Assembly by State Senator Scott Wiener (D-SF) on December 15, 2016. SB 35 aims to address the California housing shortage by increasing housing supply. The bill was signed into law on September 29, 2017 by Governor Jerry Brown as part of California’s 2017 Housing Package – a set of 15 bills that provide “an injection of new regulatory and financial resources” for cities.

Scott Wiener introduced SB 35 to increase housing supply in cities that are not producing enough housing, by encouraging cities to either increase housing development on their own or be forced to accept housing development. After the bill’s passage, Wiener claimed: “SB 35 will retain local control for those cities that are producing their share of housing, but create a more streamlined path for housing creation in those cities that are blocking housing or ignoring their responsibility to build.”

== Provisions ==
Under existing law, every locality (cities and unincorporated parts of counties) has a housing production goal for low by income level in the Regional Housing Needs Assessments (RHNA). SB 35 requires localities to report their housing production by income level in their annual housing element progress reports (APRs). The units produced is compared to the RHNA targets at the halfway point and end of each cycle. If the locality does not meet its pro-rated RHNA goals, then certain projects can use a streamlined approval process over the next half-cycle.

In order to use the streamlined approval process, the development must:

- follow all local objective zoning and design standards
- be on land zoned for residential use.
- designate some units to be priced below market rate for people making certain incomes:
  - if the locality did not meet its above-moderate income RHNA goal, at least 10% of units must be below market rate housing
  - if the locality did not meet its low income RHNA goal, at least 50% of units must be below market rate housing
- not be constructed in an ecologically protected area.
- be multi-unit housing and not single family homes.
- pay construction workers union-level wages.

If the development meets all criteria, localities must approve the project in either (1) 60 days if the development contains less than 150 housing units; or (2) 90 days if the development contains more than 150 units of housing.

== Background ==
California housing costs are among the most unaffordable in the United States. In 2018, the median San Jose home cost 10 times the median household income; Los Angeles homes cost 9.5 times; San Francisco homes cost 8.9 times; San Diego homes cost 8.1 times. California is the most expensive state to rent in, in the United States.

California has had a housing shortage since 1970 and ranks 49th among 50 states for housing units per capita. The problem has worsened following the Great Recession as housing development fell to 40,000 units in 2009 and has not reached pre-recession levels. California needs approximately 180,000 units per year to match current growth. Slow housing development combined with high housing demand has increased housing costs in every city in California.

The state’s high rent prices have translated into increased homelessness, more households spending half their income on housing, and an exodus of low and middle income households leaving to states with lower cost of living. The housing shortage negatively impacts the Economy of California.

Wiener introduced SB 35 to increase housing supply and stabilize or decrease home prices. The bill is part of California's 2017 Housing Package, which are 15 small bills devoted to increasing housing affordability. Supporters hope SB 35 will shorten the permitting process for certain developments.

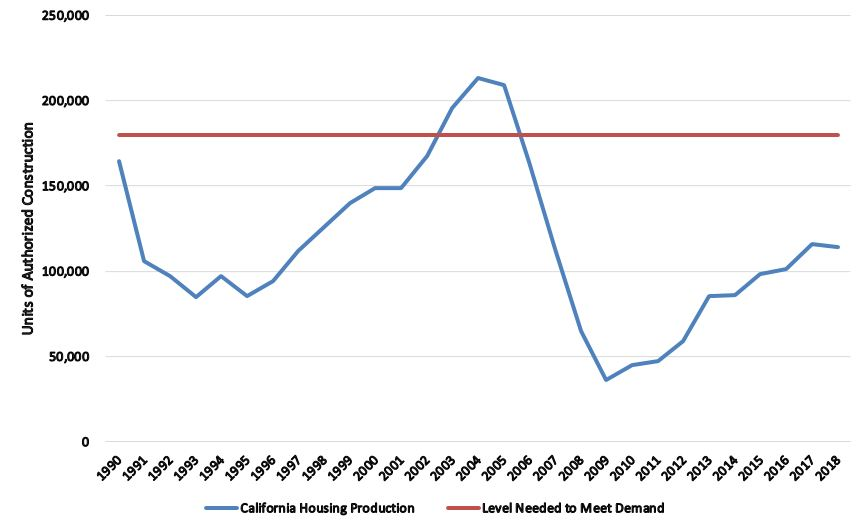
California has built fewer units than needed since 1990.

=== Housing Element Act of 1969 ===
The Housing Element Act of 1969 mandates all cities construct a specified number of low, middle, and market rate housing. Cities are required to construct their RHNA, which the HCD determines every 8 years. The RHNA determines the amount of low-income, moderate income, and market housing each municipality is expected to construct to meet regional housing needs. However, 97.6% of cities in California do not construct the required number of low-income housing units allocated.

"Local control is about how a community achieves its housing goals, not whether it achieves those goals," Wiener said in a statement. "SB 35 sets clear and reasonable standards to ensure that all communities are part of the solution by creating housing for our growing population."

Local officials, however, often disagree with state officials over what these housing production goals should be.

== Opposition ==
The League of California Cities and many municipal governments opposed SB 35 for imposing state control over local planning rules. City governments opposing SB 35 include: Berkeley, Beverly Hills, Encinitas, Palm Desert, Vallejo, San Luis Obispo, Huntington Beach, and Walnut Creek.

Several cities have pursued court cases to stop SB 35 following its passage. In 2019, Huntington Beach sued the State of California to stop the enforcement of SB 35. The City Attorney for Huntington Beach, Michael Gates, claims SB 35 “unconstitutionally interferes with the city’s authority to enforce local zoning laws.” In 2021, Huntington Beach lost the lawsuit and decided not to appeal.

== Impact ==
Some housing experts believed the impact of SB 35 on overall housing production will be minimal due to the standards required to meet streamlining approval. The bill was expected to increase below-market housing for the lowest income households. As of November 2019, officials had approved more than 6,000 homes under SB 35, including 4,700 in the Bay Area and 1,600 in Southern California. A report in 2023 found that between 2018 and 2021, 156 pending and approved housing projects had resulted from the law with the projects total 18,215 proposed new units, two-thirds of which was affordable housing.

=== Cities Affected by SB 35 ===
As of 2024, 47 cities and counties had met their lower and above moderate income RHNA. 254 jurisdictions had not created enough housing to meet their above moderate income RHNA. Projects in these jurisdictions can qualify for SB 35 housing if developments with 10% of housing units devoted to below market housing.

238 jurisdictions had not created enough housing to meet their above very low and low-income RHNA. Projects in these jurisdictions can qualify for SB 35 housing if developments with 50% of housing units devoted to below market housing.

=== SB 35 Projects ===
==== Vallco Mall Project ====
The Vallco Shopping Mall redevelopment project in Cupertino is the largest project to have utilized SB 35. The project will include retail and 2 million square feet of office space, and 2,402 total units of housing. Half of those units, or 1,201, will be designated as below-market rate housing for low and very low-income residents. The project was approved on September 21, 2018 for streamlining under SB 35. In October 2018 the City Council approved, and residents then filed a referendum on, another Vallco project by the same developer—the 2018 Vallco Specific Plan. In May 2019 the City Council repealed the Vallco Specific Plan.

==== 681 Florida Street ====
The Mission Economic Development Agency (MEDA), an affordable housing development agency, used SB 35 to expedite construction of a 100% affordable housing development in San Francisco’s Mission District. The development will include 130 housing units devoted to low-income families; 30% of those apartments are reserved for formerly homeless families. Without SB 35, the development would have followed the normal approval process and been delayed for 6 months to a year.

== Amendments ==
In 2021 AB1174 was signed into law, which gives projects (like Vallco) using the special approval of SB35 more time to start construction to compensate for delays caused by lawsuits.

=== SB 423 ===
In 2023, SB 423 was signed into law, which extended the Sunset provision for SB 35 for ten years until January 1, 2036, expands the scope and geographic reach of SB 35’s ministerial review process and modifies SB 35’s labor and affordability requirements. In particular, SB 423 included a legislative finding that affordable housing is a statewide concern instead of a municipal concern, and expanded SB 35's amendments of Government Code Section 65913.4 to apply to all cities, including charter cities.

Finally, SB 423 narrowed SB 35's broad exemptions within the coastal zone (and, by extension, the broad powers of the Coastal Act and the California Coastal Commission to prohibit streamlined multifamily housing within the zone), allowing for some areas in the coastal zone to be eligible for streamlined multifamily housing development under SB 35.

The law entered into force in San Francisco on June 28, 2024, and in the rest of California on January 1, 2026.

== See also ==
- Affordable Housing
- California Environmental Quality Act
- California housing shortage
- San Francisco housing shortage
- California Senate Bill 79
