= Scott Wiener =

American politician (born 1970)

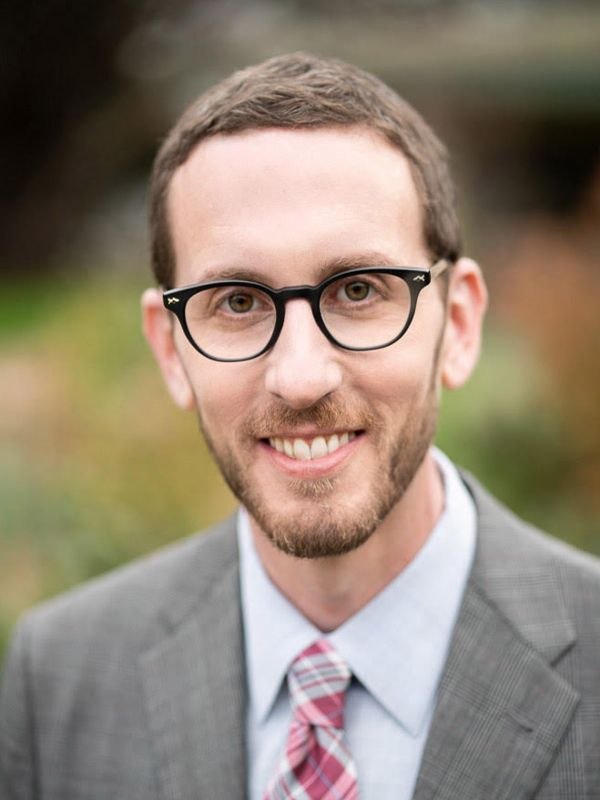
- Official portrait, 2017

Member-elect of the U.S. House of Representatives from California's 11th district
- Assuming office January 3, 2027
- Succeeding: Nancy Pelosi

Member of the California Senate from the 11th district
- Incumbent
- Assumed office December 5, 2016
- Preceded by: Mark Leno

Member of the San Francisco Board of Supervisors from the 8th district
- In office January 8, 2011 – December 5, 2016
- Preceded by: Bevan Dufty
- Succeeded by: Jeff Sheehy

Personal details
- Born: Scott David Wiener; May 11, 1970 (age 56) Philadelphia, Pennsylvania, U.S.
- Party: Democratic
- Education: Duke University (BA); Harvard University (JD)
- Website: State Senate website; Campaign Website

Scott David Wiener (born May 11, 1970) is an American politician who is the U.S. representative-elect from California's 11th congressional district. A member of the Democratic Party, Wiener has served as a member of the California State Senate from the 11th district since 2016 and previously served as a member of the San Francisco Board of Supervisors from the 8th district from 2011 to 2016.

Raised in New Jersey, Wiener earned degrees from Duke University and Harvard Law School. He was an attorney and LGBTQ+ rights advocate in San Francisco before his election to the San Francisco Board of Supervisors. As a supervisor, Wiener chaired the San Francisco County Transportation Authority and represented San Francisco on the regional Metropolitan Transportation Commission and the Golden Gate Bridge, Highway and Transportation District Board. He was elected to the California State Senate in 2016.

Throughout his political career, Wiener has been known as a prominent advocate for various measures to facilitate more housing construction in California to alleviate the California housing shortage. As a state senator, he has authored several pieces of landmark legislation to increase housing supply in California.

Wiener was elected to the U.S. House of Representatives in 2026, replacing retiring former Speaker Nancy Pelosi. Upon taking office, he will become the first openly LGBTQ+ person elected to represent San Francisco in Congress.

== Early life and career ==
Scott David Wiener was born in Philadelphia to a Jewish family on May 11, 1970. The son of a small business owner and a public school teacher, he was raised in southern New Jersey and graduated from Washington Township High School. Wiener received a bachelor's degree from Duke University and a Juris Doctor from Harvard Law School. He also spent one year studying history in Santiago, Chile, on a Fulbright Scholarship.

After law school, Wiener clerked for New Jersey Supreme Court Justice Alan B. Handler. He moved to San Francisco in 1997 to work as a litigation attorney at Heller Ehrman White & McAuliffe. In 2002, he went to work as a deputy city attorney under San Francisco City Attorney Dennis Herrera.

Before being elected to the Board of Supervisors, Wiener chaired the San Francisco County Democratic Central Committee. He also co-chaired the Alice B. Toklas LGBTQ Democratic Club and the San Francisco LGBT Community Center and served on the national board of directors of the Human Rights Campaign.

== San Francisco Board of Supervisors ==
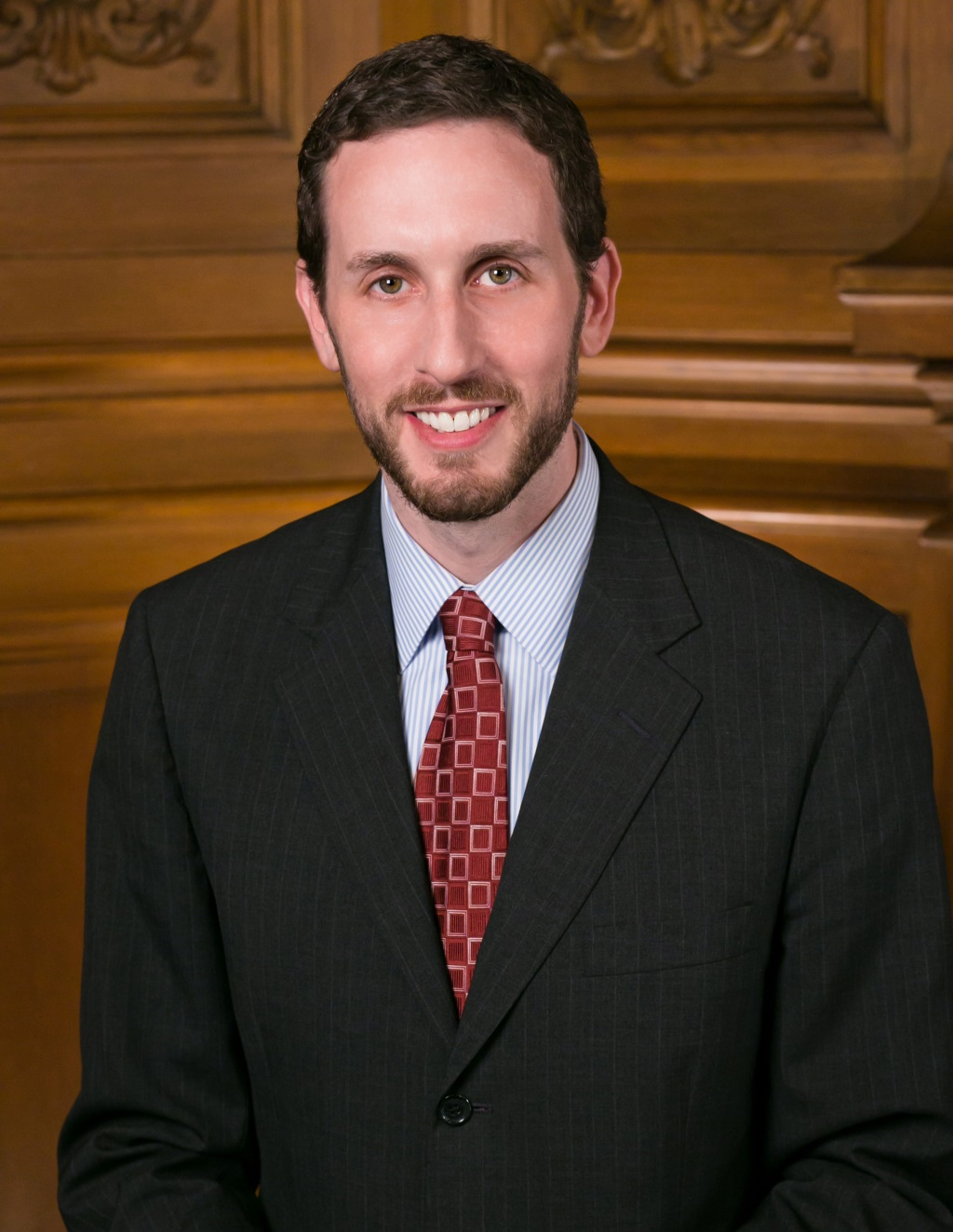
Wiener's official portrait while in the San Francisco Board of Supervisors

Wiener was elected to the San Francisco Board of Supervisors on November 2, 2010, carrying 42.4% of the vote in the first round of ranked choice voting. After the two lowest-finishing candidates were dropped, Wiener won election with 18,239 votes, or 55.4%, over the second-place finisher, attorney Rafael Mandelman. He was reelected in 2014 in the first round of ranked-choice voting with a majority of the vote.

Wiener represented the 8th district, which included the Castro District, Glen Park, Noe Valley, Diamond Heights, Twin Peaks, Duboce Triangle, Corona Heights, Buena Vista, and parts of the Mission District.

=== Housing ===
In 2011, after a string of fires caused by arson in San Francisco's Castro district, Wiener authored legislation allowing residents temporarily displaced by fires or natural disasters to rent other apartments at below-market rates. Previously, landlords willing to rent out apartments to a tenant on a temporary basis could not offer lower rents without locking these rates in at that rate under rent control.

In 2012, Wiener passed legislation promoting the production of student housing while restricting the conversion of existing rental stock to student housing. That same year, the Board passed legislation to allow the construction of residential units as small as 220 square feet, known as micro-apartments.

In 2014, Wiener introduced two measures to allow the construction of new in-law units in San Francisco: one allows units to be built within the Castro neighborhood, and one allows owners of buildings undergoing seismic retrofit to add in-law units. In 2016, Wiener authored legislation to fast-track the approval of affordable housing projects.

In 2016, Wiener introduced legislation to extend rent control protections to people living with HIV/AIDS.

=== Transportation ===
Wiener focused much of his policy work on San Francisco's public transportation. He criticized the lack of investment in transit in San Francisco, and advocated for additional funding measures. His proposals included changing the transit-impact development fee and a ballot measure to tie Muni funding to population growth. The latter measure, Measure B, required 75% of increased funding to improve Muni reliability and 25% of the funding to improve street safety. Measure B was passed on November 4, 2014.

Wiener also encouraged increases in the number of taxis in San Francisco and supported expanding access to car-share programs.

In 2013, the full Board of Supervisors passed Wiener's legislative package to streamline pedestrian safety projects. The legislation included creating a centralized Street Design Review Committee, making it easier for developers to implement pedestrian safety projects as gifts to the city, and amending the Fire Code to provide more leeway for sidewalk extensions.

Over his tenure as a Supervisor, Wiener advocated for increased pedestrian safety by advocating against widening streets. In 2014, this led to a public disagreement with the San Francisco Fire Department around street design at new developments at Hunters Point and Candlestick Point. The Fire Department sought to widen streets in these developments to be 26 feet wide, 6 feet wider than the legal requirement.

=== Public spaces ===
In 2012, Wiener sponsored controversial legislation banning nudity at un-permitted events, which was eventually passed by the Board. Wiener stated that "[t]his is what local government is for—to respond to the issues affecting citizens where they live."

In 2013, the Board of Supervisors passed another bill authored by Wiener establishing park hours for San Francisco's parks. The supervisor claimed the ban was needed to combat vandalism and illegal dumping. Critics said it was unfairly aimed at the homeless.

Wiener was active in promoting and regulating food trucks. In 2013, Wiener's legislation establishing guidelines for San Francisco's food truck industry was passed by the Board of Supervisors.

Another of Wiener's policy focuses was increasing government spending on parks, including supporting the expansion of park patrol in budget negotiations. Wiener also authored legislation to have the city government purchase a parking lot on 24th Street and turn it into a public park.

On the Budget Committee, Wiener advocated for adding government funding for maintenance and safety in San Francisco's parks and other public spaces. He was also involved in efforts to increase municipal spending on street resurfacing and maintenance of street trees and park trees.

=== Environment ===
In 2015, Wiener authored legislation to make San Francisco the first city in the country to require water recycling in new developments. He also proposed legislation to require each unit in multi-unit buildings have their own water submeters.

=== Nightlife and culture ===
Early in his first term, Wiener requested a study of the economic impacts of entertainment and nightlife, an issue in his first campaign. The study, completed by the San Francisco City Economist, found San Francisco nightlife generated $4.2 billion in economic productivity in 2010.

In 2013, Wiener authored legislation to make it easier for businesses to get permits for DJs, and to offer a new permit to allow for live music in plazas.

=== HIV and LGBT issues ===
In September 2014, in an online essay on The Huffington Post, Wiener revealed that he was taking Truvada, a pre-exposure prophylaxis (PrEP) that reduces the risk of HIV infection. Wiener said he disclosed his usage of PrEP in an effort to reduce the stigma around it. He also cited the need for more awareness and expanding access as other keys for making PrEP successful. He worked with David Campos to support ensuring low-cost access to Truvada for pre-exposure prophylaxis against HIV after Wiener revealed his own PrEP use.

As a member of the Board's budget committee, Wiener advocated for HIV/AIDS services and restoring lost federal funds. In 2016, he helped secure funding for San Francisco's Getting to Zero effort, which aims to end all new HIV infections in San Francisco.

In 2016, he introduced a bill, passed by the Board, barring the city from doing business with companies based in states that have laws that bar policies banning discrimination against lesbian, gay, bisexual, and transgender people, such as North Carolina, Tennessee, and Mississippi. The Board repealed the law in 2023 because it had been determined to be ineffective as well as increased costs for the city by up to 20%.

=== Parental leave ===
In 2016, Wiener authored first-in-the-country legislation to require fully paid parental leave for new parents after childbirth or adoption, applying to both parents. As a result of this legislation, employers in San Francisco must give employees up to six weeks of paid time off.

=== Soda tax ===
In 2014, Wiener introduced a ballot measure that would have imposed a two cents per ounce tax on the distribution of sodas and other sweetened beverages, and used the money to fund "healthy choices" in San Francisco. The measure, which was also sponsored by Supervisors Malia Cohen, Eric Mar, John Avalos, David Chiu, and David Campos, aimed to reduce soda consumption and increase programs to combat the rise of diabetes and other related diseases in San Francisco. The proposal was endorsed by much of San Francisco's local political establishment, including all its state legislators, and many health organizations, but voters in the 2014 election did not give the measure the 2/3 supermajority required to impose a new tax. The American Beverage Association spent more than $9 million to defeat Measure E, which was also opposed by the Libertarian Party of San Francisco. Ultimately, the measure garnered 55.6% of the vote, below the 66.7% needed to pass.

== California State Senate ==
In 2016, Wiener ran for California State Senate in the 11th district to succeed termed-out senator Mark Leno. As it is required to include a Chinese name on the ballot (17% of San Francisco speaks Chinese), Wiener chose the name Wei Shangao (Chinese: 威善高; pinyin: Wēi Shàngāo; Jyutping: Wai1 Sin6-gou1), meaning "bold, majestic, charitable and tall", on the basis of his 6 feet 7 inches (2.01 metres) height. During the election, the meaning of Wiener's Chinese name drew attention, and he was compared to a giraffe by Chinatown community leader Rose Pak, an image he embraced by placing giraffes on Chinese-script campaign materials.

Wiener received several endorsements, including from Leno. He defeated fellow Supervisor Jane Kim in the November general election. He was re-elected in 2020 and 2024.

Wiener chaired three committees: Budget and Fiscal Review, Legislative Ethics, and the Joint Legislative Budget Committee. He was also the assistant majority whip and chaired the California Legislative LGBTQ Caucus.

Wiener was named the most effective state legislator in the 2023–2024 session and in the top five most effective in his first four sessions by the Center for Effective Lawmaking at the University of Virginia and Vanderbilt University.

=== Psychedelic decriminalization ===
In 2021, Wiener authored, sponsored, and introduced SB-519, a bill that provides for the decriminalization of psilocybin, DMT (dimethyltryptamine), LSD (lysergic acid diethylamide), ibogaine, ketamine, mescaline, and MDMA (3,4-methylenedioxymethamphetamine) in the state of California. The bill would eliminate criminal penalties for the consumption, possession, and social sharing of these substances and the plants or fungi that contain them. The bill also has a provision that legalizes the furnishing of these substances by licensed physicians/NPs/PAs and licensed mental health practitioners for therapeutic purposes in the treatment of patients. SB-519 passed in the California State Senate by a vote of 21–16 on June 1, 2021. It headed to the California Assembly for a vote to determine final approval, however, after a third reading it was ordered to the inactive file on August 25, 2022, by Assemblywoman Eloise Gómez Reyes. It officially died on November 30, 2022, in the Assembly with no further action to be taken. SB-519 reemerged as SB-58 for the 2023-24 session, and on September 7 passed the Senate with 21 ayes and 14 noes. The bill was presented to Governor Gavin Newsom on September 13, 2023, and he vetoed it on October 7.

=== HIV and LGBT issues ===
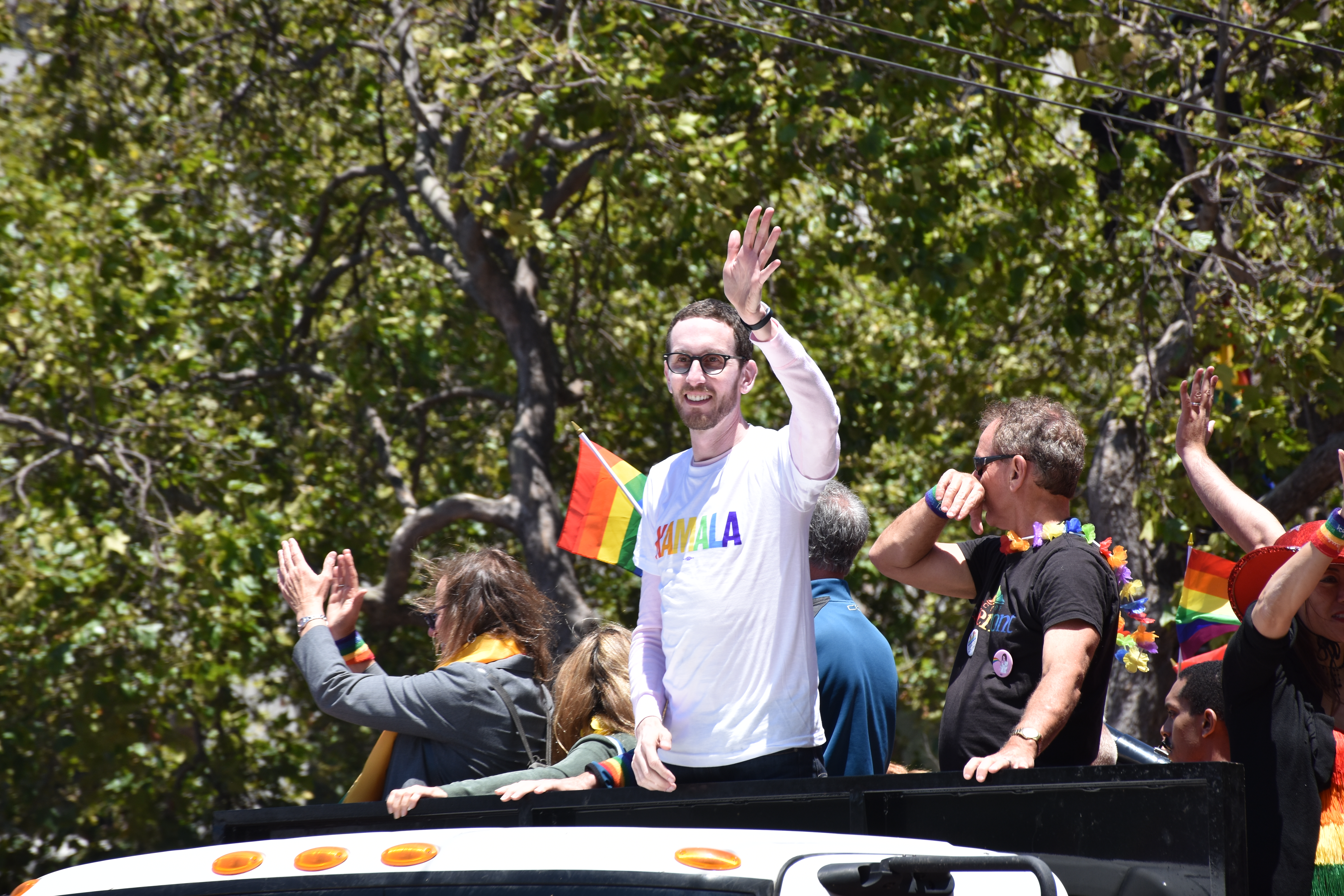
Wiener at the San Francisco Pride on June 30, 2019

In 2017, Wiener originated three bills centered around HIV and LGBTQ issues. He co-authored Senate Bill 239, which lowered the penalty of exposing someone to HIV without their knowledge and consent from a felony to a misdemeanor. Wiener said that the laws had unfairly singled out HIV-positive people. The bill passed and was signed by Governor Jerry Brown on October 6, 2017.

Wiener co-authored Senate Bill 179 in 2017, to create a third, non-binary gender option on government documents, which passed in 2018.

Wiener authored Senate Bill 219 in 2017, which strengthened protections against "discrimination based on sexual orientation, gender identity, gender expression, or HIV status" for LGBTQ seniors living in long-term care facilities. The bill was opposed by groups who argued that the bill criminalized bathroom gender designations and would force care providers to address those under their care with gender-appropriate language. Wiener called these arguments "transphobic" and "absurd". The naming provision of the law was overturned on July 16, 2021, after the Third District Court of Appeals ruled that the law violated employees' free speech rights.

In October 2019, Governor Gavin Newsom signed Wiener's legislation expanding access to HIV-prevention medications PrEP and PEP. Under the new law, pharmacists can distribute HIV pre- and post-prophylaxes without a physician's prescription.

In 2019 and 2020, Wiener attempted to pass Senate Bill 201, a bill that would have restricted physicians' and parents' ability to decide to perform reconstructive genital surgery on intersex infants, and would instead require the impacted child be old enough to decide to undergo surgery. The bill was opposed by the California Medical Association and other medical groups who said they would not be able to apply medical expertise, which would threaten patient safety. The bill died in committee. Wiener re-introduced the bill a second time in January 2021, this time as Senate Bill 225.

Wiener introduced Senate Bill 145 on January 18, 2019. The bill proposed to remove the requirement to place someone convicted of non-forcible oral or anal sex with a minor over the age of 14 (provided the convicted is less than 10 years older) on the sex offender registry, instead leaving this to the judge's discretion, as was the case for vaginal sex. He argued that existing law was discriminatory toward LGBTQ couples where the partners were just above and below the age of legal consent. Wiener received online harassment and death threats from those who claimed the bill protected pedophiles. The bill was signed into law by Gavin Newsom in September 2020.

In 2021, Wiener authored SB 107, a "trans refuge bill" to protect transgender children seeking gender affirming care in California and their families from civil and criminal punishment under other states' laws. The law would restrict the enforcement of out-of-state laws and policies that penalize gender affirming care in subpoenas and arrest warrants, and in parental custody cases. SB 107 became law in 2022.

=== Solar energy and storage ===
In 2017, Wiener sponsored two bills that expanded solar and renewable energy use in California. Senate Bill 71 required solar to be installed on many new buildings; the bill's rooftop mandate was loosened by regulators in 2020 to allow offsite solar to be purchased instead. Senate Bill 700 created a 10-year program to give rebates to customers who install energy storage systems, including batteries. In 2026, Wiener's bill permitting balcony solar power was signed into law.

=== Net neutrality ===
In 2018, Wiener authored Senate Bill 822, which enacted net neutrality protections. Later signed by the governor, this bill reinstated Obama-era regulations in California and banned zero-rating. This legislation was the subject of litigation from the US Justice Department and several trade groups. In 2021, the Justice Department dropped out of the lawsuit, and a federal judge dismissed the trade groups' challenge.

=== Presidential tax return disclosure ===
In 2019, Wiener co-authored Senate Bill 27, which would have required presidential candidates to disclose their tax returns to be eligible to appear on a California primary ballot. The bill was signed into law by Gavin Newsom and subsequently challenged in court by lawyers of Donald Trump. In September 2019, a federal judge blocked the law, stating it violated four separate sections of the Constitution of the United States in addition to a separate federal law. The Attorney General of California appealed the judge's decision, with a decision expected by a federal appeals court sometime after the March 2020 primary election.

In a November 2019 unanimous ruling, the California Supreme Court said the law violated the California Constitution and that Donald Trump may appear on the state's March 2020 primary ballot without being required to release his tax returns.

=== Transportation ===
In 2019, Wiener authored Senate Bill 127, a "complete streets" bill that would increase the amount of revenue from the state's new gas tax that could be directed to bike lanes or pedestrian improvements from $100 million to $1 billion. Newsom vetoed the bill due to opposition from Caltrans over its cost and the potential loss of federal highway funds.

In 2024, Wiener authored SB 960, another "complete streets" bill that mandates that Caltrans prioritize road improvements for pedestrians, cyclists, and public transit riders on state-owned city surface streets, as well as document and publish reasons for failure, and include complete streets facilities, including transit priority facilities, in the asset management plan. Newsom signed the bill into law on September 27, 2024.

=== State estate tax ===
In 2019, Wiener co-authored Senate Bill 378, which would have imposed a 40 percent estate tax in California for estates over $3.5 million, or $7 million for a married couple, until the federal estate tax threshold is reached. The bill failed to move out of committee.

=== State oversight of federal law enforcement ===
In 2025, Wiener authored the No Secret Police Act (SB 627), which criminalized the wearing of masks by federal and local law enforcement agents (but not state law enforcement) statewide during operations outside of certain uses. The bill was signed into law on September 20, 2025, over opposition from the Trump administration.

In 2026, Wiener authored the No Kings Act (SB 747), which would allow citizens to sue federal, state, and local officers and government officials for monetary damages in state court for violations of First, Fourth and Fifth (Equal Protections) Amendment protections. The bill would expand upon the Tom Bane Civil Rights Act. The bill was introduced in response to the weakening of Bivens actions in successive U.S. Supreme Court decisions.

=== Housing ===
In 2017, Wiener authored SB 35 (which was approved as part of a 15-bill housing package that also included funding and other bills to reform housing production in California), which will require the cities that have fallen behind on their state housing production goals to streamline approval of new housing.

"Local control is about how a community achieves its housing goals, not whether it achieves those goals," Wiener said in a statement. "SB 35 sets clear and reasonable standards to ensure that all communities are part of the solution by creating housing for our growing population."

A study by the UC Berkeley Terner Center for Housing Innovation found that SB 35 resulted in approvals for 18,215 housing units in the immediate three years after its implementation, two-thirds of which was affordable housing.

In 2018, in an effort to address the state's housing affordability crisis and CO_{2} emissions, Wiener introduced Senate Bill 827, which would require cities and counties to allow apartment buildings of four to eight stories in "transit rich areas"—defined as land within a half-mile of a major transit stop or a quarter-mile of a stop on a high-frequency bus route. Wiener introduced the bill as part of a housing package, along with bills to make it easier to build farmworker housing and to improve local accountability to build new housing. SB 827 failed to make it out of committee. In 2019, Wiener introduced SB 50, a follow-up to Senate Bill 827. This version did not advance through committee in the senate in 2019 and was reconsidered in the 2020 legislative session, where it was killed in a senate floor vote, marking the third failed attempt by Wiener to pass a transit-density housing bill.

In 2020, in a fourth failed attempt at passing a statewide upzoning bill, Senator Wiener introduced legislation (Senate Bill 902) that would allow 2 to 4 unit apartment buildings on single-family lots throughout California, depending on a city's size.

Wiener was the co-author of a fifth failed upzoning bill in 2020, Senate Bill 1120, which would have required the approval of duplexes proposed on any single family lot in California.

In 2021, Wiener authored and co-authored several housing bills. He authored Senate Bill 10 and Senate Bill 478, and co-authored Senate Bill 9, the California HOME Act. SB 9 upzones most of California to allow for up to 4 housing units per lot, and SB 10 makes it easier for local governments to rezone for higher densities near transit rich areas. SB 478 prevents local governments from imposing a FAR or a minimum lot size that would make dense housing impossible. Both bills were signed into law by Newsom in September 2021.

In 2022, Wiener co-authored SB 886, which would exempt the UC, CSU and community college systems from the lengthy California Environmental Quality Act (CEQA) review process. The CEQA process has been used to obstruct, delay, and block campus and housing developments in California. Earlier in 2022, UC Berkeley was forced to cut its enrollment figures because some Berkeley residents used CEQA to block and delay Berkeley from enrolling students. Newsom signed the bill into law on September 28, 2022.

Wiener also co-sponsored AB 2097, which abolished parking minimums for homes and commercial buildings within a half-mile (0.80 km) of public transit, or for neighborhoods with low rates of car use.

In 2024, after the California HOME Act was struck down in a superior court on constitutionality grounds, Weiner voted in favor of SB 450, which clarified the language of the HOME Act to comply with the ruling and increase its enforceability against local governments. Weiner also co-authored SB 312, which clarified implementation language regarding SB 886, and SB 937, which allows housing developers to defer payment of their impact fees until completion of the project. Newsom signed all three bills into law in September 2024.

In 2025, Wiener introduced SB 79, the Abundant and Affordable Homes Near Transit Act, which revived his earlier transit-density housing bills SB 827 and SB 50. The bill passed the Senate on June 3 and the Assembly on September 11, with the Senate voting in concurrence with significant Assembly amendments on September 12. Despite opposition, the bill was signed into law on October 10, 2025.

=== Alcohol sales until 4 am ===
Nationwide, 2 am is the most common last call time, though bars in New York City can serve until 4 am and some until 5 am in Chicago. Citing the cultural and economic benefits of nightlife, Wiener proposed legislation to allow cities to extend alcohol sales in bars and restaurants to 4 am. Senator Mark Leno, Wiener's predecessor, had attempted to pass a similar bill. The bill passed the Senate with bipartisan support, but failed in the Assembly. Wiener reintroduced the bill the following year, this time limited to six cities whose mayors had supported the idea: San Francisco, Oakland, Los Angeles, Sacramento, West Hollywood, and Long Beach. The bill (SB 905) was expanded to include Palm Springs, Cathedral City and Coachella, and passed the Assembly 51–22 and the Senate 28–8. Governor Jerry Brown vetoed the legislation September 28, 2018, citing California Highway Patrol concerns over drunk drivers.

Wiener's most recent bill, SB 930, would allow seven cities to serve alcohol until 4 am under a five-year pilot program, if their city councils allow it. Proponents say that it would help venues still recovering from the pandemic stay in business, while opponents say that it would add to alcohol-related problems, including DUIs in cities adjacent to those allowing later last calls.

=== Environment ===
In January 2021, Wiener introduced SB 252, the Bear Protection Act. Sponsored by the Humane Society of the United States, SB 252 would ban the sport hunting of black bears, except in situations where the bears must be killed for safety reasons, protecting property, livestock, endangered species, or scientific research. This legislation drew immediate support from animal rights activists. Critics of SB 252 claim that Bear Tags (the license needed to go bear hunting) generate $1.39 million in revenue that goes towards California's wildlife agency.

In February 2024, Wiener proposed SB 1227, one of the broadest rollbacks of the California Environmental Quality Act (CEQA) to allow most projects in downtown San Francisco to bypass the law for the next decade. Some critics said it would be a giveaway to developers. David Lewis, executive director of Save the Bay, said the plan sounded "pretty extreme".

=== Vehicular speed governors ===
In January 2024, Wiener proposed SB 961 that would require every passenger vehicle, truck and bus manufactured or sold in California to have speed governors starting in 2027. These would automatically limit the vehicle's speed to 10 miles per hour (16 km/h) above the legal limit.

=== Artificial intelligence safety ===
In February 2024, Wiener introduced the Safe and Secure Innovation for Frontier Artificial Intelligence Models Act (SB 1047) to reduce the potential risks of highly advanced frontier AI models. The bill also aimed to establish CalCompute, a public cloud computing cluster. It was eventually vetoed by Gavin Newsom.

=== Business regulation ===
In June 2024, Wiener co-authored SB 1524 with Bill Dodd to amend California's "junk fees" legislation (SB 478). The amendment created an exemption allowing restaurants and food service providers to continue adding service charges and mandatory gratuities to bills, provided these fees are "clearly and conspicuously" displayed on menus and advertisements. The original SB 478, sponsored by Attorney General Rob Bonta and co-authored by Senators Dodd and Nancy Skinner, had banned hidden fees across various industries starting July 1, 2024.

The restaurant exemption bill passed unanimously in both the California State Senate and Assembly. Wiener stated the amendment "strikes the right balance between supporting restaurants and delivering transparency for consumers." Co-author Matt Haney acknowledged that restaurants were unintentionally affected by the original legislation, stating "This should have never happened in the first place."

=== Fundraising ===
Of the $1,110,296.82 that Wiener raised for his campaign fund in 2020, 30.6% came from the real estate lobby, then tech (15.4%), followed by labor unions (11.3%). One-third of the money from labor came from unions representing the building trades. 51% of his funding during came from within his Senate district, while 49% came from the rest of California. The 34% of his contributors who donated $1,000 or more made up 83% of his total raised. While 23% of Wiener's contributions were $100 or less, these small contributions came from only 2.2% of his supporters, many of whom donated repeatedly.

=== California Legislative Jewish Caucus ===
Wiener co-chaired the California Legislative Jewish Caucus (CLJC). With the CLJC, he contributed to securing $80 million in 2021, 2024, and 2025 ($240 million total), from the state budget for various Jewish community priorities.

As co-chair of the CLJC, Wiener contributed to legislation aimed at countering antisemitism and promoting Holocaust education in public schools and universities. He and CLJC worked to ensure that ethnic studies legislation to "provide clear direction to local school districts and the California Department of Education that anti-Jewish and anti-Israel content cannot be included in the teaching of ethnic studies". Wiener and the CLJC successfully advocated for the incorporation of part of the IHRA definition of antisemitism (but not its mentions of Israel) in California's Ethnic Studies Model Curriculum (ESMC). On February 14, 2025, Wiener introduced AB 715, a bill described by proponents as preventing K-12 antisemitism through a series of new prohibitions and requirements, including the appointment of an Antisemitism Prevention Coordinator. AB 715 was signed into law in October 2025.

Wiener has received criticism for his support of Zionism. In March 2025, Wiener criticized anti-Israel protesters for targeting what he called a Jewish community event. In response Jewish Voice for Peace accused him of "twist[ing] criticism [of Israel] into antisemitism". In June 2026, Wiener was forced to leave the San Francisco Trans March by protestors over his positions on foreign policy relating to Israel. Wiener believes the protestors were antisemitic for singling him out of the march.

In February 2024, he said Israel should "be more surgical" in Gaza and called Benjamin Netanyahu “despicable” and said “he had to go”, but opposed with CLJC a Gaza ceasefire resolution in Sacramento. Wiener and other CLJC officials commended California State University Chancellor Mildred García for placing Sonoma State University President Mike Lee on leave after Lee announced support for an academic boycott of Israel in agreement with protesters and Students for Justice in Palestine, which was seen as aligning with the Boycott, Divestment and Sanctions (BDS) movement, and which Wiener described as "horrific and wrong".

==== Resignation as co-chair ====
Wiener announced his resignation as co-chair of the California Legislative Jewish Caucus, effective February 15, 2026. The resignation followed controversy over his statements on Israel's conduct in the Gaza war. Asked on January 7 whether Israel is committing a genocide in Gaza, Wiener declined to answer. After an uproar, he said on January 11, 2026, that he viewed the Netanyahu government's actions in Gaza as genocide.

In a statement, Wiener said: "Since I stated my view that the Netanyahu government committed a genocide in Gaza, I have had many in-depth conversations with members of the Jewish community with a range of perspectives. While many in the community strongly disagree with my view, I am grateful for their willingness to engage with me and hear my perspective, showing once again the deep respect for difference in our community."

Wiener will continue as a member of the Jewish Caucus after stepping down from the co-chair role.

== U.S. House of Representatives ==
=== 2026 election ===
In 2023, Wiener formed an exploratory committee to run for the U.S. House in California's 11th district, but later said he would not contest the seat until incumbent Nancy Pelosi retires. In October 2025, The San Francisco Standard reported that Wiener would run in 2026 regardless of whether Pelosi retired, prompted by a similar run by progressive candidate Saikat Chakrabarti. Wiener announced his campaign on October 22, 2025. Pelosi announced her retirement on November 6.

Wiener and San Francisco supervisor Connie Chan advanced to the general election in the June 2 primary. Wiener launched a satirical AI chatbot depicting Chan. He took down the chatbot after it made comments such as "I'm afraid my San Francisco accent is so thick I can barely understand myself."

In November, Wiener defeated Chan for the seat, with Chan conceding the race one day after Election Day. This made him the first openly gay person elected to represent San Francisco in Congress. Wiener will be sworn in at the beginning of the 120th United States Congress on January 3, 2027.

== Incidents ==
=== Robbery ===
In 2015, Wiener was robbed of his cell phone on the corner of 16th and Valencia in San Francisco. He negotiated with the would-be thieves and got them to agree to accept $200 for the return of his phone. Wiener and the would-be thieves then walked to a nearby ATM, where the transaction was caught on tape by the cameras at the ATM. A Wells Fargo security guard also observed the robbery in progress, and called the police. A woman and a man were later arrested and charged with second-degree robbery. In June 2018, the same woman was arrested again for a similar incident at the same BART station. She was arrested twice in 2020 for gunpoint robberies and in 2024 for conspiracy and assault.

=== Bomb threat ===
In June 2022, Wiener was the victim of a false bomb threat, reportedly due to his work on behalf of the LGBT community.

=== Halloween kids event ===
In October 2024, pro-Palestinian protesters disrupted a children's pumpkin carving event hosted by Wiener. He reiterated his support for the two-state solution and said the protesters were targeting him "in ways that they're not targeting non-Jewish leaders."

=== San Francisco Trans March ===
In 2026, while running for Congress, Wiener was heckled by protesters at the San Francisco Trans March who hounded him over his position on the genocide in Gaza. Wiener claims he was forced to leave prematurely out of fear of further escalation, his first time not attending since 2004. Wiener believes he was forced to leave over his Jewish identity and background, describing the incident as antisemitic.

== Personal life ==
Wiener is gay and Jewish. He has lived in the Castro District since 1997.

== Electoral history ==
2016 California State Senate 11th district election
Primary election
Party	Candidate	Votes	%
Democratic	Jane Kim	118,582	45.3
Democratic	Scott Wiener	117,913	45.1
Republican	Ken Loo	25,189	9.6
Democratic	Michael A. Petrelis (write-in)	4	0.0
Total votes		261,688	100.0
General election
Democratic	Scott Wiener	209,462	51.0
Democratic	Jane Kim	201,316	49.0
Total votes		410,778	100.0
Democratic hold			

2020 California State Senate 11th district election
Primary election
Party	Candidate	Votes	%
Democratic	Scott Wiener (incumbent)	167,124	55.7
Democratic	Jackie Fielder	99,566	33.2
Republican	Erin Smith	33,321	11.1
Total votes		300,011	100.0
General election
Democratic	Scott Wiener (incumbent)	254,635	57.1
Democratic	Jackie Fielder	191,065	42.9
Total votes		445,700	100.0
Democratic hold			

2024 California State Senate 11th district election
Primary election
Party	Candidate	Votes	%
Democratic	Scott Wiener (incumbent)	166,610	73.0
Republican	Yvette Corkrean	34,447	15.1
Democratic	Cynthia Cravens	18,519	8.1
No party preference	Jing Chao Xiong	8,717	3.8
Total votes		228,293	100.0
General election
Democratic	Scott Wiener (incumbent)	325,148	77.8
Republican	Yvette Corkrean	92,715	22.2
Total votes		417,863	100.0
Democratic hold			

U.S. House of Representatives
Preceded by Nancy Pelosi	Member of the U.S. House of Representatives from California's 11th congressional district Taking office 2027	Elect
