= California Density Bonus Law =

The California Density Bonus Law (DBL, California Government Code 65915) is a 1979 California statute which grants developers of housing a density bonus, or the ability to exceed city-mandated density limits for their projects, if certain affordable housing prerequisites are met. The law has been repeatedly amended since its enactment, largely in order to ameliorate the state's housing shortage. The original bill, AB 1151, was co-drafted by Mike Roos and Tom Bates in the California State Assembly (and co-sponsored by Senators Wilson, Marks and Carpenter), and was signed into law by then-Governor Jerry Brown on October 1, 1979.

== Amendments ==
- AB 1866 (2002), permits for second units a ministerial act and forces local governments to grant nearly any request for a density bonus.
- SB 1818 (2004) increased the maximum density bonus for certain affordable housing projects from 25% to 35%, and required cities to provide affordable housing builders with three incentives of the developer's choice.
- AB 2222 (2014)
- In 2016:
  - AB 2501
  - AB 2442
  - AB 2556
  - AB 1934
- AB 1763 (2019) amends the DBL to allow 100% affordable housing projects.
- AB 2345 (2020) increases the maximum density bonus from 35% to 50%, provided that at least one of three thresholds are met (15% of all units reserved for “very low income” housing, 24% of all units are reserved for “low income”, 44% of all units are reserved for “moderate income”).
- SB 290 (2021) expands the DBL to include affordable housing for low income college students.
- AB 1551 (2022), reinstated the ability to seek DBL benefits for commercial projects.
- AB 2334 (2022) Allows a housing development project in 17 counties to receive added height and unlimited density if the project is located in an urbanized very low vehicle travel area, at least 80 percent of the units are restricted to lower income households, and no more than 20 percent are for moderate income households.
- AB 1287 (2023) provide an additional density bonus and an additional incentive for projects that provide very low or moderate-income units
- AB 2694 (2024) expands the definition of a density bonus-eligible development to include a residential care facility for the elderly.
- AB 2430 (2024) prohibits local governments from charging monitoring fees for certain affordable housing developments, including those developments using the Density Bonus Law as well as those subject to a regulatory monitoring agreement with the state.
