= Parking mandates =

Guidelines for municipal parking

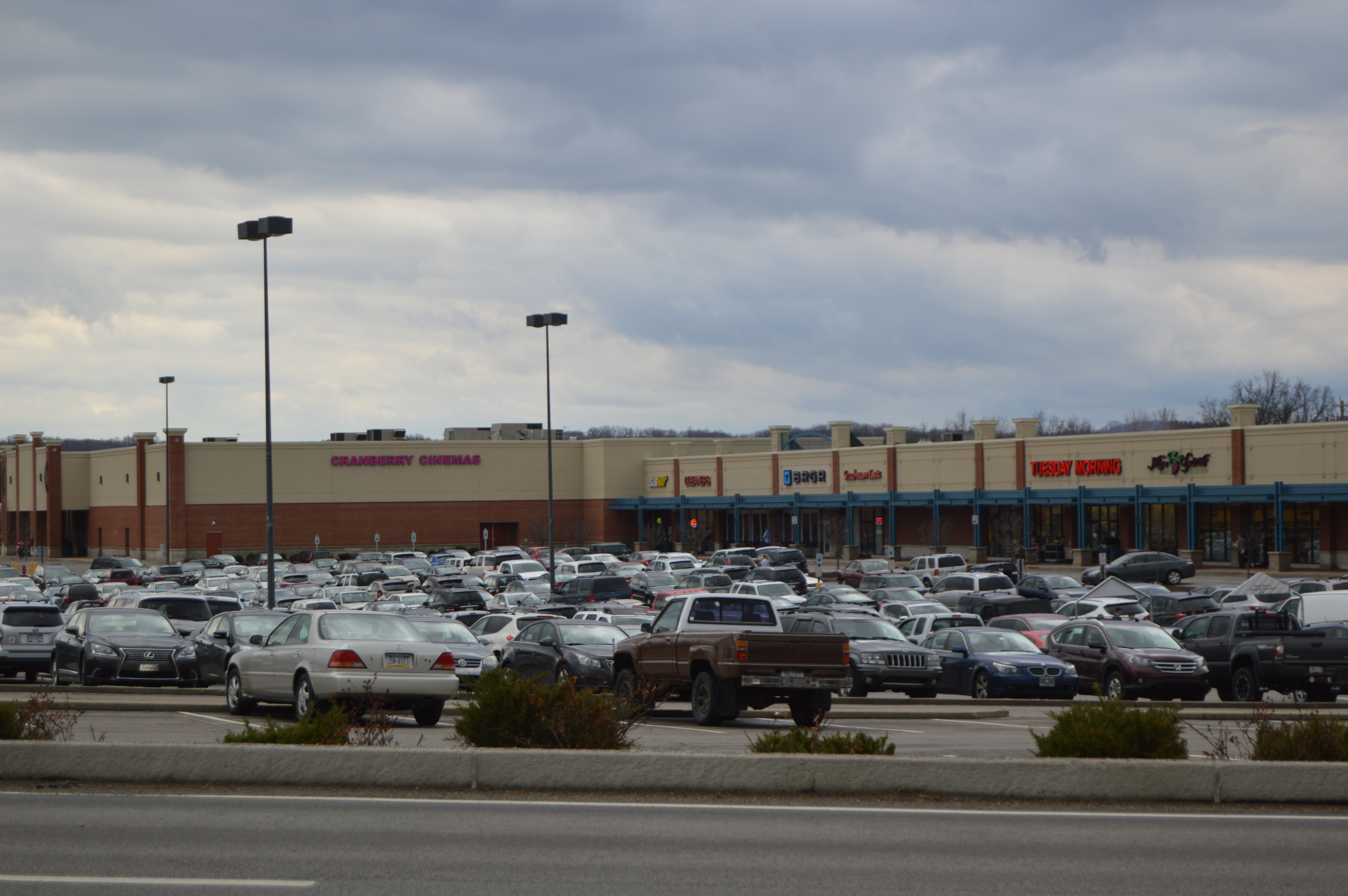
Parking minimums can contribute to a car-dominated built environment.

Parking mandates or parking requirements are policy decisions, usually taken by municipal governments, which require new developments to provide a particular number of parking spaces.

Parking minimums were first enacted in 1950s America during the post-war construction boom with the intention of preventing street parking from becoming overcrowded. Requirements vary based on the type and usage of the building, with some typically being one parking spot per apartment, 300 square feet of retail or commercial space, 100 square feet of restaurant dining area, two hospital beds, or five seats in a church's pews.

Parking minimums typically lead to an oversupply of parking relative to what the market would supply in the absence of the minimums. They also provide an implicit subsidy to drivers by making parking spaces more abundant. Parking minimums have shifted the cost of parking spaces from drivers to building developers, making them a hidden cost ($28,000 for non-garage, $56,000 for garage spaces, excluding the cost of land) that thereby increases the cost of rents by nearly 20%, and has contributed to America's housing affordability problem. The oversupply of parking contributes to lower housing densities and reduced walkability. As a consequence, local and state governments have increasingly in recent years reduced or eliminated parking minimums or enacting parking maximums for new developments. When parking mandates for new housing construction are reduced or eliminated, substantial increases in housing supply occur.

== Minimums ==
The first parking minimums in the United States were implemented by Columbus, Ohio, in 1923.

In North America, parking minimums are requirements, as dictated by a municipality's zoning ordinance, for all new developments to provide a set number of off-street parking spots. These minimums look to cover the demand for parking generated by said development at the peak times. Thus different land uses, whether they be commercial, residential or industrial, have different requirements to meet when deriving the number of parking spots needed. For example, the City of Los Angeles requires churches to build one parking space for every five seats in the pews, and hospitals to build two per bed.

U.S. cities use Parking Generation Rates, a guidebook of statistical data from the Institute of Transportation Engineers, to source parking minimums. In these reports, the ITE define a type of land use's Parking Generation through an observational study. Parking Generation is found by the land uses, average generation rate, the range of generation rates, the subsequent standard deviation, and the total number of studies. This process is done by various studies to find the range. In the case of ITE studies, the observation of a single site multiple times is considered a stand-alone study. Then the average of the range is used to determine the average parking generation rate of a land use. This handbook is updated every 5 years to determine the demand for parking for specific land uses. Parking Generation Rates provided by the ITE doesn’t explicitly state what parking minimums should be, but rather is just a collection of statistical data for urban planners to interpret and use for at their own volition. Regardless, ITE's Parking Generation has been an influential factor in most North American cities in the adoption parking ratios, according to land use, to determine the minimum spots required by new developments.

Parking Generation, regardless of its widespread use in North American cities, is disputed as a tool to determine parking minimums due to its questionable statistical validity. Statistical significance is a major qualm with Parking Generations due to the oversimplification of how the parking generation rate is derived. Peak parking observed by ITE doesn’t take into account the price of parking in relation to the number of parked cars. Thus the demand at any given time for parking is always high because it is oversupplied and underpriced, resulting in an inflated calculation for the parking generation rate of a land use. Parking minimums also often fail to take into account nearby parking, requiring businesses with peak patronage at different times of day to build out the largest possible lots.

Donald Shoup, a UCLA urban planning professor who pioneered the field of parking research, has called parking minimums a "pseudoscience", as the ITE's calculations are typically based on minimal data and approximations that cannot be widely applied to other businesses, even of the same type. Many businesses have been forced to build parking lots that are never full even on the busiest days. Before it eliminated parking minimums for new developments in 2022, San Jose, California, had a requirement for bowling alleys have seven parking spots per lane, assuming that all would be in use by a full party that all drove separately. For the broad use of "Recreation, commercial (indoor), the city required one parking spot per 80 square feet of recreational area, regardless of the expected number of users coming by car. A restaurant had to build a parking lot eight times the size of the restaurant itself.

While there are no government estimates of the number of parking spots in the US, Shoup estimated that 700 million to 2 billion parking spots exist, yielding a ratio of 2.5 to 7 times as many parking spaces as registered vehicles.

Adoption of parking minimums by municipalities based on ratios from Parking Generation has had a substantial effect on urban form. This can be seen in the lack of density characterized by the suburbanization of North America post-World War II. The growth of the car industry and car culture, in general, has much to do with the mass movement of the middle-class away from urban centers to the exterior of the city in single family detached homes. With population growth, lower density, and parking minimums, many cities in the United States began to be characterized by streetscapes that heavily favor the automobile.

Parking minimums are also set for parallel, pull-in, or diagonal parking, depending on what types of vehicles are allowed to park in the lot or a particular section of it. According to the American Planning Association's report on parking standards, "In particular, off-street parking standards are an attempt to minimize spillover parking on public streets and to ensure safe and efficient movement of traffic by requiring that the supply of parking at the site of the development is adequate to meet demand."

In recognition of the many problems parking minimums cause, since 2017 many U.S. cities have overhauled or entirely repealed their parking minimum laws.

The average number of parking spots per new residential unit increased from 0.8 in 1950 to a peak of 1.7 in 1998, and has since declined to 1.1 by 2022. The average number of parking spots per 1,000 square ft. of new office buildings shows a similar change, from 1.25 in 1950 to 3.75 in 1999 to 2.25 in 2022.

=== Curb congestion ===
Parking minimums fail to accomplish their primary stated purpose, which is to eliminate curb congestion. As long as cities make curb spaces free, drivers will attempt to find a space closer to their destination, resulting in curb parking always being full, regardless of the number of available off street spaces.

=== Traffic congestion ===
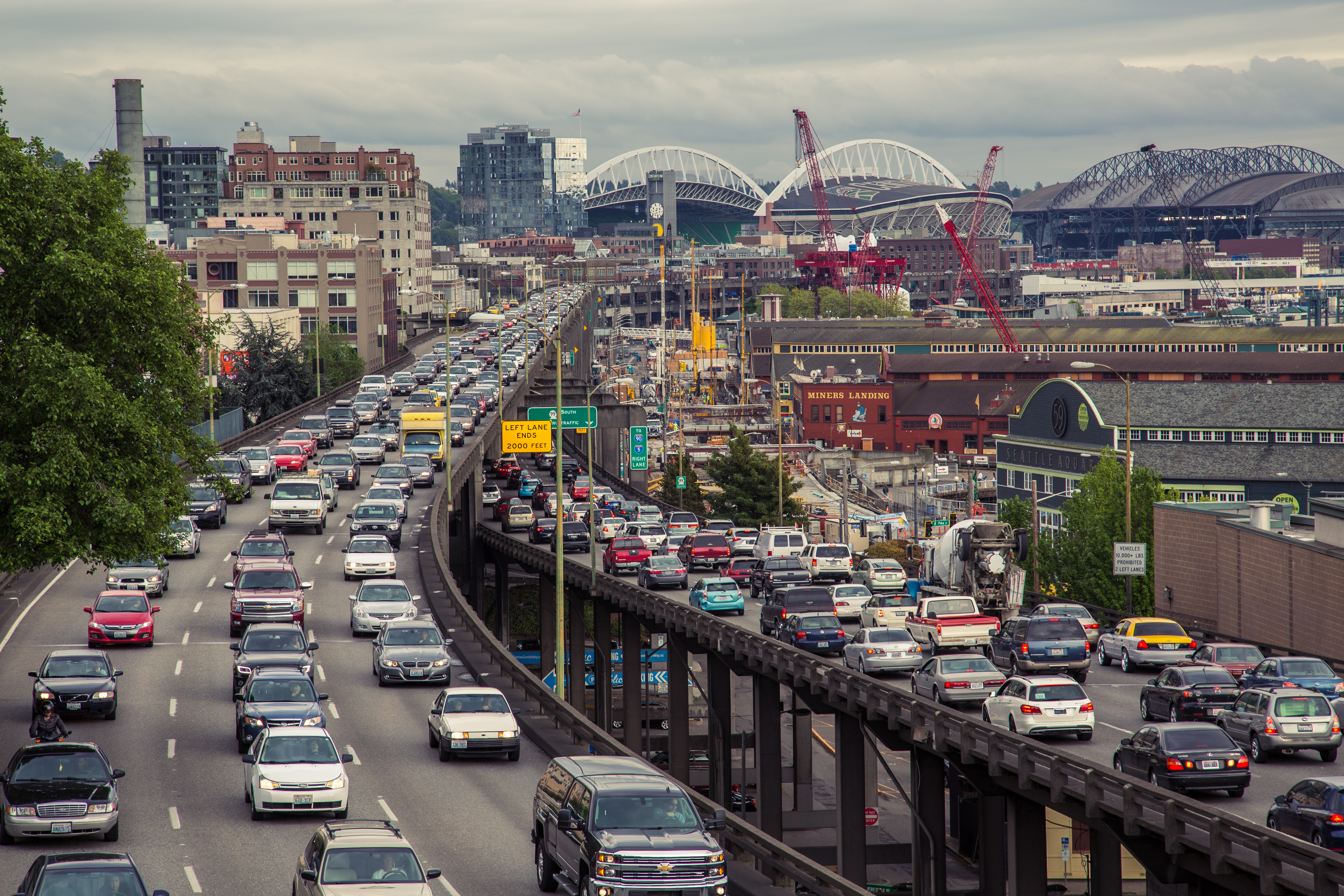
Traffic congestion is common in many areas of the United States.

Drivers' expectations of free on-street parking close to their destination has led to extra traffic congestion, as drivers circle blocks looking for free parking spaces, while pay parking spaces in nearby garages sit unused. A 2012 study found that on weekdays and weekend special events, downtown garages were 20% vacant.

=== Costs ===
Parking minimums shift the cost of parking from users to developers and make construction costs much more expensive. A parking structure costs an average of $28,000 per spot, and an underground one about $56,000 per spot, excluding the cost of land. Spots in downtown Los Angeles usually cost more than $50,000 per space. Of the $274 million it cost to build the Walt Disney Concert Hall in Los Angeles, $100 million was for the underground parking garage.

In 2023 in Charlotte, North Carolina, a developer was allowed to build a 104 unit apartment complex without any on-site parking. This enabled the developer to build 25% more units and rent them for $250 less per month and still be profitable. In Aurora, CO, the city requires a 405 unit apartment complex to have 485 parking spaces, (95 more than the developer predicts the residents will need), thereby increasing the average monthly rent by $100.

A 2016 study found that parking garages added 17% to an average rents, and that 75% of renters without cars had parking spots included in their rent, for which they collectively paid $440 million yearly for parking spaces they did not use.

=== Effect on built landscape ===
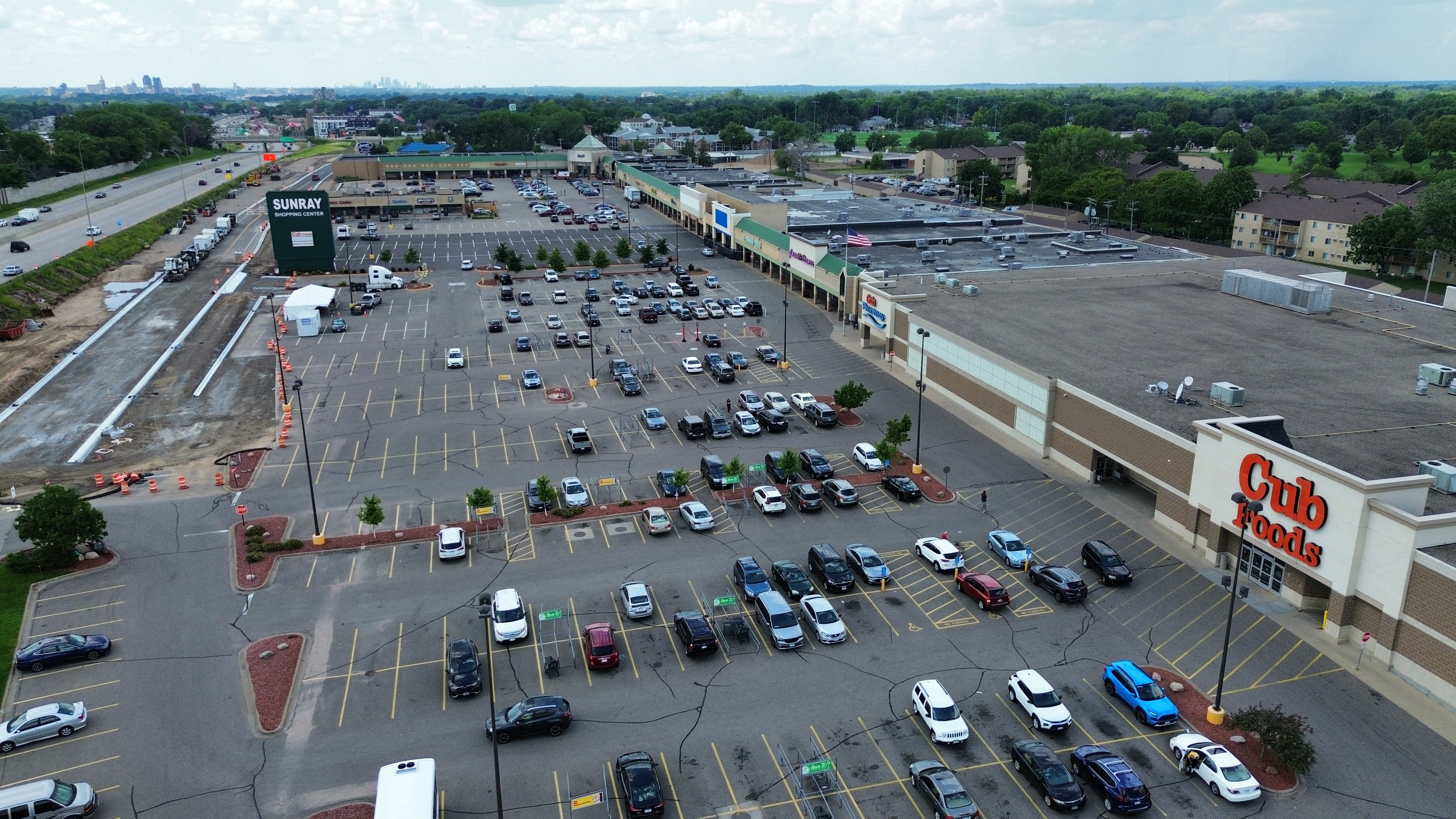
Parking mandates have led to the predominance of strip malls in the United States.

Parking requirements force a reduction in density in cities. The predominance of strip malls and office parks in the United States is due to these configurations being the cheapest way to meet parking requirements.

=== Climate implications ===
Recently parking minimums have become a focus for climate change and affordable housing activists, as it has become apparent that a high proportion of urban land use is allocated for cars as a result of these policies. Environmentalists are now urging urban planners to design for a society which is moving away from private transportation and to promote public transport by design. For example, in 2006 the Department for Communities and Local Government of United Kingdom publish "policies in development plans should set maximum levels of parking for broad classes of development".

=== Reform legislation ===
==== United States ====
- On July 21, 2022, Oregon's Land Conservation and Development Commission, a board of the Oregon Department of Land Conservation and Development, passed a set of rules prohibiting Oregon's eight largest metropolitan areas (spanning 48 cities and 5 counties, accounting for two-thirds of the state’s population) from mandating parking minimums within a half-mile of frequent transit, for homes of 750 square feet or less, or for homes meeting affordability targets.
- In September 2022, the U.S. state of California passed AB 2097, which includes a ban on parking minimums for buildings within 1/2 mile (0.80 km) of public transit.
- In May 2024, Colorado passed HB-1304, which eliminates and prohibits parking mandates for most multifamily residential properties within a metropolitan planning organization within a quarter mile of a transit stop or station after June 30, 2025, with an exception for multifamily properties of more than 20 units.
- In May 2025, Washington passed Senate Bill 5184 (the Parking Reform and Modernization Act), which caps the minimum parking requirements that cities and counties impose on new development to 0.5 spaces per residential dwelling unit and two spaces for every 1,000 square feet of commercial space. It also prohibits cities from requiring any off-street parking spaces when issuing permits for certain uses, including affordable housing, senior housing, and child care facilities.
- On November 26, 2025, Connecticut HB 8002 was signed into law, prohibiting local governments from enforcing parking minimums on residential developments with fewer than 16 homes, while requiring developments with more than 16 homes to submit a parking needs assessment. In addition, the law allows any municipality to create up to two “conservation and traffic mitigation districts” (covering a combined total of no more than eight percent of the municipality’s land area) where a town can extend parking minimums to development of less than 16 units. Finally, the law allows municipal planning and zoning commissions to adopt regulations allowing applicants subject to a minimum parking requirement to pay a fee instead of providing the required parking spaces in commercial developments and residential or mixed-use developments with at least 16 dwelling units. It was the first statewide parking mandate preemption signed into law east of the Mississippi River.
- In December 2025, Illinois SB 2111 (including the Illinois People Over Parking Act) was signed into law, prohibiting local governments from enforcing parking minimums on any development project within one-half mile of a public transportation hub or one-eighth mile of a public transportation corridor.

Since 2015, over 35 major cities in the US have partially or fully eliminated parking minimums, including Anchorage, Austin, Berkeley, Buffalo, Fayetteville, Hartford, Lexington, Minneapolis, Nashville, Raleigh, Richmond, San Jose, and Spokane among others.

== Maximums ==
In Europe, parking maximums are more common. As a condition of planning permission for a new development, the development must be designed so that a minimum percentage of visitors arrive by public transport. The number of parking places in the development is limited to a number less than the expected number of visitors.

== See also ==
- Alternate-side parking
- Controlled Parking Zone
- Decriminalised parking enforcement
- Disc parking
- Parking enforcement officer
- Parking meter
- Parking violation
- Residential zoned parking
- Single-family zoning, another policy increasingly blamed for housing costs and climate impacts
