= Starter Home Revitalization Act =

California housing law

The Starter Home Revitalization Act of 2021 (SHRA), officially California Assembly Bill 803 (AB 803), is a 2021 California statute law which requires local governments approve an application to subdivide a lot (up to five acres) zoned for multifamily housing into smaller lots for single-family homes if it meets specific criteria. The bill was authored by Tasha Boerner Horvath and signed into law by Governor Gavin Newsom on August 31, 2021.

== Amendments ==
=== SB 684 ===
California Senate Bill 684 (SB 684) is a 2023 California statute which requires cities to ministerially allow property owners to subdivide multifamily lots to create subdivisions with up to 10 houses, townhouses or condos in multi-family-zoned areas. The law amended the 1974 Subdivision Map Act to streamline approvals for more housing on a single parcel of land. The law also amended the Planning and Zoning Law as well as the SHRA. The law requires that eligible housing projects must protect existing housing that:

- is designated for low-income tenants;
- is rent-controlled;
- has been occupied by renters in the last 5 years, and subject to local and environmental standards.

The law also limits the period for cities and counties to approve or deny an application under the law to 60 days, with applications being deemed approved after the period's expiration unless the local government makes a finding related to the development’s compliance with certain requirements or the development’s specific, adverse public health or safety impact.

The law, drafted by Anna Caballero, was originally written to apply to single-family zones of housing, but the language regarding single-family zones was removed by the Assembly Housing Committee prior to passing the Assembly. The bill was signed into law by Gavin Newsom on October 11, 2023, and took effect on July 1, 2024.

The first project to utilize the bill broke ground on March 6, 2026, in the city of Campbell.

=== SB 1123 ===
A subsequent law, SB 1123 (2024), allows for SB 684 to be applied to vacant lots in single family zones. The bill also clarified language in SB 684 so that variety of different lower-cost homeownership types and builders are eligible to use the bill, including tenancies in common and community land trusts. The bill, also drafted by Caballero, was signed into law by Newsom on September 19, 2024, and took effect on July 1, 2025.

== Proposed amendments ==
SB 1116 (2026), introduced by Caballero, would amend the SHRA to increase design flexibility, update definitions, and add new oversight and reporting requirements, among other changes. The bill was passed by the Legislature on August 26, 2026 and sent to the governor.
