= 2017 Los Angeles Measure S =

Failed referendum calling for more restrictive zoning

Measure S – 2017
- Neighborhood Integrity Initiative

Results
Choice	Votes	%
Yes	121,101	29.60%
No	288,012	70.40%
Total votes	409,113	100.00%
Registered voters/turnout	2,030,173	20.15%

Measure S, originally known as the Neighborhood Integrity Initiative, was considered by voters in the city of Los Angeles in the March 7, 2017, election. It would have imposed a two-year moratorium on development projects seeking variances from some aspects of the city's zoning code, made changes to the environmental impact statement requirements in the code, and required the city to update its comprehensive plan during the moratorium. The measure failed, with over two-thirds voting against it.

Proponents said it was necessary to curb high-density development that would have adversely affected the city's suburban character and favored gentrification at the expense of affordable housing. They also charged that city government had been corrupted, citing recent disclosures of campaign contributions to mayor Eric Garcetti and other officials from developers with large projects awaiting city approval that those contributors had attempted to conceal. Opponents, who included many advocacy groups for the homeless as well as the city's business community, building trades unions and developers, said that while the measure addressed some real problems, it went too far and would have not only prevented the construction of new affordable housing but made the city's overall quality of life worse by aggravating an existing housing shortage. They questioned whether the money spent by the AIDS Healthcare Foundation (AHF) to get the initiative on the ballot was really related to the foundation's mission, and suggested that it was really motivated by AHF director Michael Weinstein's desire to block a development that would have dominated the view from his office window.

Backers had originally intended for the initiative to be on the ballot in November 2016, but later decided to postpone it to March, when the city's mayor and some council members were up for re-election, a move opponents said was really meant to put the measure in front of an electorate believed more likely to support it. Since those races were not vigorously contested, Measure S received the greatest attention from the media and voters. Both sides accused the other of deception. Proponents filed a suit alleging that opponents overstated the claimed negative impact of the measure in material submitted for the city's voters' guide, while opponents highlighted false claims of support attributed to Garcetti and actor Leonardo DiCaprio. The sheriff's department also attempted to block a mailer in support of Measure S designed to look like an eviction notice after many recipients mistook it for a real one.

A fundamental question underlying Measure S was not just its provisions, but the direction the city itself would take. Supporters invoked its late 20th-century image as a highly suburbanized city of detached single-family homes whose occupants primarily used their cars to get around; opponents looked toward a future as a more densely developed city where residents of the densely populated areas relied as much on buses and Metro Rail. Its failure, coupled with voters' approval of a half-cent sales tax increase the previous fall to fund expansions to regional mass transit systems, was seen as a turning point in the city's history.

== Background ==
Measure S is the most recent contest in a long-running struggle over the character of Los Angeles as a city.

=== Historically suburban character of Los Angeles and zoning controversies ===
Seventy-two suburbs in search of a city ...

— Remark about Los Angeles often misattributed to Dorothy Parker

"Los Angeles has been a place of multiple centers: religious and secular, indigenous and colonial, European and mestizo, and familiar and alien," public television station KCET said in a 2011 account of the city's development since the early 19th century. Unlike other American cities, which grew outward from a historical core and only later acquired suburbs, Los Angeles had started as a series of suburbs, with small communities such as Pasadena, Whittier and Long Beach starting up at some distance from Los Angeles in the late 19th century. Recounting how the efforts of developers like Henry E. Huntington and Harry Chandler and the water supply system developed by William Mulholland shaped the city, the Los Angeles Times later said "Builders, more than planners, facilitated the city's growth spurts, driven by one singular vision: Los Angeles would be a city of small houses on small lots."

This pattern of development continued as the city's population grew explosively in the early 20th century, fed by rail access and the promise of a relaxed, almost utopian lifestyle amid a warm, gentle climate and natural setting, along with an early adaptation to widespread automobile use. High-rise development remained largely confined to downtown, with newly settled areas retaining the small-scale suburban feel that had distinguished the city's earlier days, resulting in "an ethnically diverse and complex metropolis in which no single economic or cultural center dominates a region that is neither conventionally suburban in character nor fully urban."

The city first established a zoning code in 1921. By the end of the decade complaints that political corruption was leading to spot zoning, or single-property changes to use, for commercial establishments, undermining the purpose of the zoning code, were already abundant; they continued even as the real estate market slowed in the Great Depression. After the war, with federal housing subsidies driving construction, zoning was often changed when actual uses differed; most of the farms of the San Fernando Valley disappeared by the 1960s to make way for residential development. Neighborhood homeowners' associations gained political power through opposing spot zoning; by the end of the decade, public outrage over a developer's indictment for bribing officials to get a favorable zoning change led to amendments to the city charter forbidding spot zoning.

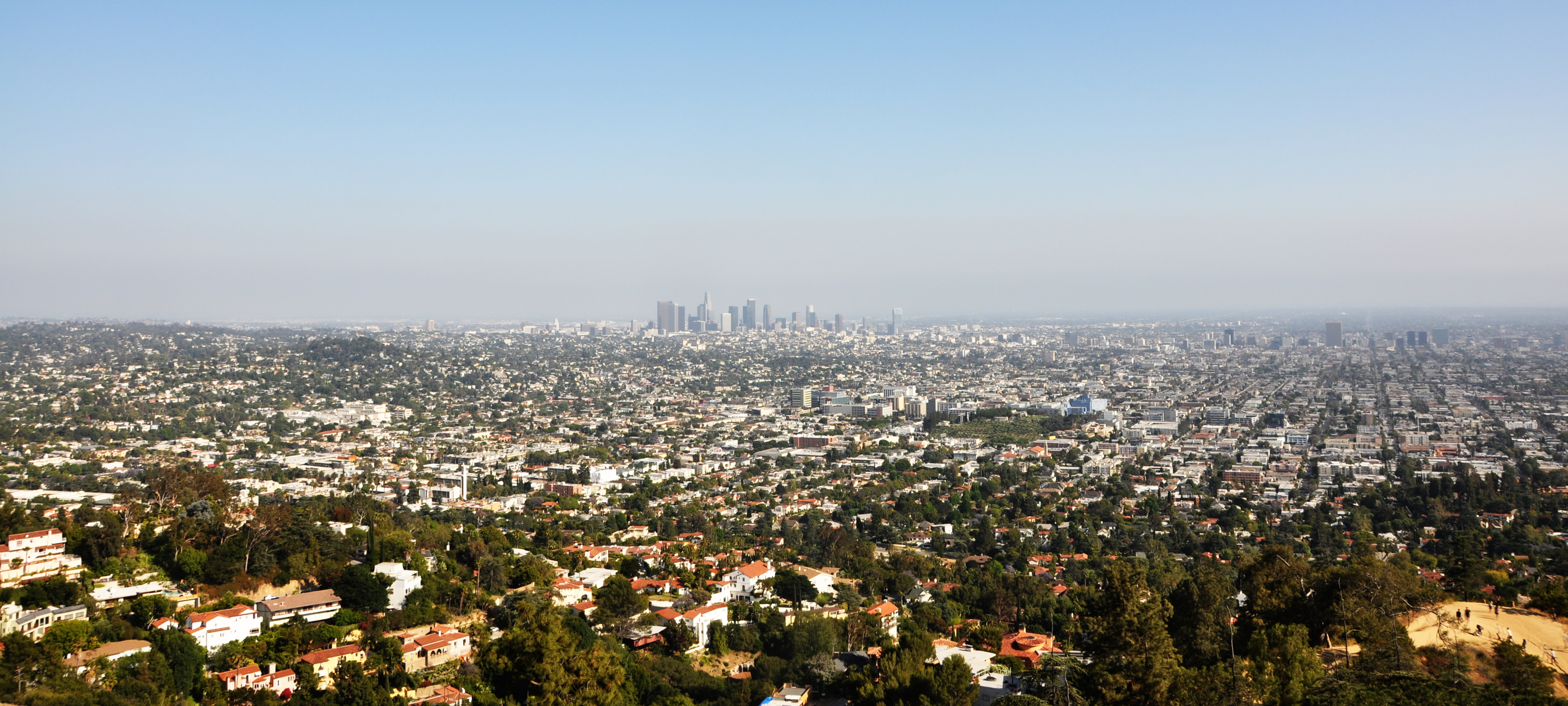
Historically, high-rise development in Los Angeles has been confined to downtown.

In the late 1970s, following the enactment of Proposition 13, which capped property tax assessments until the property changed owners, Los Angeles residents began advocating for slow growth and neighborhood preservation. A new General Plan for the city lowered density limits from a floor area ratio of 10:1, a level comparable to the New York City borough of Manhattan, in accordance with older plans for a city of 10 million, to 4.5:1, with most high-rise development confined to certain areas within the city. However, the city government, dominated by pro-growth interests, resisted implementing the necessary zoning changes. Despite the state legislature passing a 1978 law ordering the city to bring its zoning into compliance with the new General Plan by 1982, two years after that deadline barely one-quarter of the necessary changes had been made.

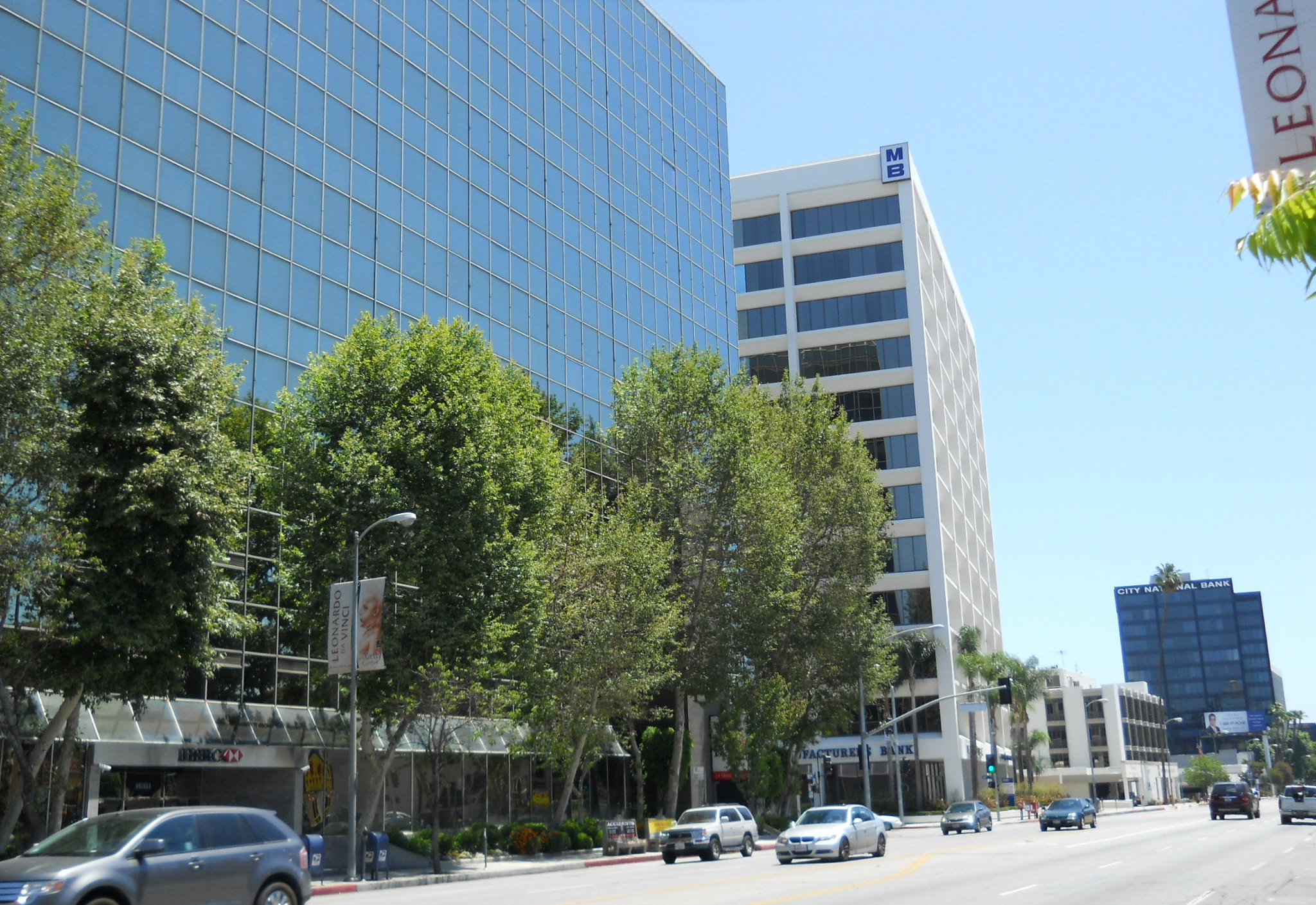
Bank buildings in downtown Encino helped spur the passage of Proposition U in 1986.

With the city's zoning code still largely reflecting older higher-density aspirations, projects were approved that residents assumed were not supposed to be built in the places they were. "Although property values continued to soar," wrote historian Mike Davis in City of Quartz, his 1990 social history of the city, "neighborhoods were Manhattanized beyond recognition." Skyscrapers were built in North Hollywood and Universal City, while Ventura Boulevard in Encino became home to the high-rise American offices of many Japanese banks. In 1986, the signatures of 100,000 voters put Proposition U, essentially cutting density limits everywhere in the city in half, and dividing it into 35 distinct neighborhoods, on the ballot. It passed later that year with 70% of the vote. Afterwards, it was later estimated that the city's zoning could allow for at most a population of 4.3 million.

Implementation of the General Plan was soon sidetracked; after the 1992 riots, city governments prioritized public safety over all their other responsibilities. Over the next decades, however, preferences in buildings and the city's needs changed, but the General Plan did not, despite a schedule that called for it to be updated every ten years. The city council increasingly dealt with this by spot zoning, usually granting exceptions to height, density, or even land use restrictions.

The provisions of Proposition U, originally intended to slow commercial development, eventually began to restrict residential construction as well. The city's housing stock grew at less than half the rate of other American metropolitan areas between 1980 and 2010. In 2005 city council eliminated the decennial requirement for updating the General Plan in favor of a "New Community Plan", but budgetary limitations brought on by the Great Recession shortly afterwards meant that by 2015, only two of the city's ten regional plans had been updated.

In the late 2000s, mayor Antonio Villaraigosa called for a future Los Angeles of "elegant density", focusing on transit-oriented development. The implementation of this vision was challenged when Hollywood residents blocked an update to that community's Specific Plan that would have allowed for higher density and taller buildings, arguing that tourists came to the area to see the Walk of Fame, not skyscrapers, and that a recent decline in the neighborhood's population was at odds with predictions of future growth. City officials insisted that census projections that almost 50,000 more people would be living in Hollywood by 2030 justified the plan. Eric Garcetti, the city councilman for the area, said that the proposed plan accommodated growth instead of creating it.

By 2015, the city's population was approaching 4 million, nearly the limit allowed by the post-Proposition U zoning. With 80% of the city's residential land zoned for single-family homes, compared to only a quarter of New York or San Francisco, both more densely populated than Los Angeles, the homeowners' associations in more affluent communities used that political power to file lawsuits under the California Environmental Quality Act against the approval of larger new developments in their neighborhoods. A later study found that many of the projects so challenged were urban infill, multi-family residential developments of the kind considered to reduce urban sprawl.

=== 2015 developments ===
In 2015, Miami-based Crescent Heights was seeking permission from the city to build the Palladium Residences, 731 luxury condominium units in two 30-story towers on the lot of the recently restored Hollywood Palladium theater. Michael Weinstein, head of the AHF, the world's largest private organization devoted to treating AIDS, had frequently opposed the project at community meetings. He complained the buildings were too high and would impair the view of the Hollywood Hills from his office on the 21st floor of the Sunset Media Center on Sunset Boulevard. After a private meeting with Crescent's local representative in July of that year failed to resolve the issues, Weinstein threatened not only to file a suit against the city to block the project but sponsor, through the AHF, an initiative to change the city's zoning code in ways that would prevent the construction of projects like his.

Later that year, Weinstein asked the board of the AHF, which had approved the organization's sponsorship of previous initiatives like Measure B and Proposition 60, requiring the use of condoms during sex scenes by actors in pornographic films, to support an initiative aimed at reforming the zoning code to prevent further large developments from skirting the intent of the city's zoning. "There was general consensus", said chair Cynthia Davis. "We agreed with what he shared with us."

=== 2016 campaign to place initiative on ballot ===
By March, the AHF had recruited journalist Jill Stewart to leave her post as managing editor of LA Weekly and serve as campaign manager for what was named the Neighborhood Integrity Initiative. It formed the Coalition to Preserve Los Angeles (CPLA) to support it. While the original plan had been to have it on the ballot in that November's general election, in the middle of the month, the CPLA announced in a news conference on the steps of City Hall that they were instead planning to have it on the March 2017 ballot, at the same time as the city's next elections for mayor and city council.

Weinstein said that the change in timetable reflected an "overcrowded" fall ballot, with that year's presidential election, races for Congress and the state legislature, as well as 20 other initiatives and propositions before voters. "The Neighborhood Integrity Initiative is a city issue, better suited for a city election, which we will have in March 2017." With city officials on the ballot as well, it was suggested that the initiative would force candidates for those seats to take positions on the issues it raised. Opponents suggested the change was meant to ensure an older, whiter and smaller electorate than that which votes in presidential election years, one likely to be more responsive to the arguments for Measure S, would consider it.

In May 2016 a poll found that 7% more potential voters were opposed to the measure than in support of it. However, 19% remained uncommitted. This was potentially enough to swing the vote in supporters favor, especially since turnout in Los Angeles's March elections is historically around 10% of the city's electorate (in March 2016, only 8.6% of voters participated).

The initiative would need over 61,000 signatures by early September to qualify for the ballot. By that time the CPLA had collected 104,000. Before city council voted on whether to adopt the measure or put it on the ballot, the two options given under the city charter, the CPLA met with Eric Garcetti, now mayor, to ask if he or council were prepared to institute measures on their own to control development. He offered only to provide more public notice of otherwise closed meetings between city officials, developers and lobbyists, a reform the CPLA considered inadequate, so the initiative was placed on the March ballot.

Opponents organized as well. Before the initiative was placed on the ballot, the Coalition to Protect L.A. Neighborhoods & Jobs (CPLANJ) was formed to work against it. In addition to business groups the group's members included Laborers' Union Local 300 and nonprofit organizations that advocated for affordable housing and the interests of the poor. "People who do not agree on other issues are coming together to put a stop to this," said a spokesman. Most of the $800,000 the coalition had raised in the first half of 2015 came from four developers—Crescent Heights, whose Palladium project Weinstein had launched the initiative in response to, was the largest single donor through its wholly owned limited liability corporation for that project; other major donors of note included Lowe Enterprises and developer and local philanthropist Eli Broad.

The debate around the initiative was seen not just as one about its provisions, or even the city's zoning, but of contrasting visions of the city. LA Weekly described it as:

... an epic struggle between urbanites and suburbanites, folks who want to see L.A. get more dense, more walkable and more bikeable versus folks who want to preserve L.A. as the car and single-family-home-dominated patchwork of neighborhoods that it mostly was—and sort of still is today ... [It] is a real debate, between two drastically contrasting visions of Los Angeles. And it is one that is a long time coming.

== Initiative ==
The initiative proposed the following actions:

- A two-year moratorium on any new project that would require a variance from maximum floor area ratio, density, height or land use restrictions already in effect for that zoning district under the city's General Plan that would result in a more intense use than that currently permitted. Exceptions would be granted for a project that was intended to be entirely affordable housing, in which vested building rights already existed, where the existing structures were found to be structurally unsound, or had been damaged by disaster such as fire or earthquake.
- Prohibit amendments to the General Plan unless they applied to an entire neighborhood defined in the plan, a named neighborhood or council area, or a development covering more than 15 acres (6.1 ha), and require that city planners demonstrate that the amendment was not passed solely to facilitate any single project or concurrently submitted group of projects.
- Require the city to update the General Plan completely every five years, starting upon passage of the initiative. All public hearings about the Specific Plans for any of the areas defined as neighborhoods in the General Plan would be required to be held in that neighborhood on evenings and weekends to ensure full community participation.
- Require that any environmental impact statement be prepared by the city planning department or a consultant it has approved for the job rather than the developer or his or her agents.
- Prohibit the city from granting any variance to parking requirements allowing less than two-thirds the required number of spaces, including remote off-site parking.

== Debate ==
The price of buying or renting a home is becoming the defining challenge of the city ...

— Hillel Aron, LA Weekly

Both supporters and opponents agreed that Los Angeles had been undergoing a severe housing crisis since the end of the Great Recession. While the city's population had grown, surpassing four million late in 2016 by official estimates, and its economy had added, and would continue to add, a commensurate number of jobs, a study by Harvard University's Joint Center for Housing Studies concluded that the city had 382,000 units less than what it needed to accommodate very low-income renters. And while rents in Los Angeles were lower than those in New York City and San Francisco, they were less affordable, since about half of Angelenos rented compared to only a third of all Americans and those Angelenos made less money than most other American renters. As a result, a 2014 study by the UCLA Luskin School of Public Affairs had found that Los Angeles had the least affordable rental housing in the country, with the average tenant spending almost half their income on rent. The problem was further exacerbated, the UCLA study had found, by a significant portion of Los Angeles renters being of considerable means themselves compared to other markets, preferring to rent in the wake of the collapse of the late 2000s real estate bubble for the stability and flexibility it gave them, driving up rents in the process.

=== Nature and cause of housing shortage ===
Supporters argued that the problem was not a housing shortage so much as an oversupply of housing for the higher end of the market, housing that often remained vacant for lack of interest or, the CPLA suggested, because they were used as investment properties. It cited a 2015 report from the city's housing department to Garcetti, warning that a large majority of Los Angeles's new housing over the preceding decade was for households earning $105,000 a year or more, far more than needed for that end of the market, yet despite that there was still a 12% vacancy rate. This, the coalition claimed, was due to the spot zoning developers were too easily able to obtain since, it said, "zoning is now meaningless in L.A." AHF founder Michael Weinstein defended his organization's financial support for the measure by noting that the foundation's biggest responsibility after taking care of patients was finding them places to live. "L.A. is in the grip of a social justice crisis over whom our city really serves," he wrote in a Times op-ed. "As we work to house patients in L.A., City Hall focuses on approving $3,500 apartments that sit empty."

In response to supporters' claims that the real cause of the housing shortage was an abundance of luxury housing, opponents said that regardless of the market segment it was intended for, any new housing would eventually drive down the price of all housing. It was also noted that overall vacancy rates were at historic lows, based on census data from the last decade, compared to 2010. The CPLA countered by citing a report by the chief economist for the popular real-estate website Zillow that this purported "trickle-down" effect was not, in fact, occurring, not in Los Angeles or any other American city it studied. In fact, it claimed, median rents for the lowest third of houses and apartments were rising at much greater rates than the overall rental market, particularly in California.

==== Possible effect on evictions of rent-controlled tenants ====
Proponents claimed that 22,000 tenants had been evicted from rent controlled housing since 2000 in order to build luxury housing, and that without Measure S that amount would increase. Since California's Ellis Act, under which landlords can evict tenants if they are no longer offering the units for rent, was state law beyond the scope of city ballot initiatives, Measure S could not address them directly. Supporters claimed instead that its provisions would drive down the number of evictions by making it harder to build the kind of housing for which tenants were evicted.

However, the Times found that many of the developments for which rent-controlled tenants had been evicted had not needed the spot zoning the measure intended to stop in order to be built; one such project had been one from which an Echo Park woman featured in one of the pro-S campaign advertisements was evicted. Fewer than 10% of all the evictions of rent-controlled tenants between 2011 and 2015 had been for projects that would have been affected by the proposed moratorium, the paper found. Miki Jackson, a spokeswoman for the supporters said that they were concerned about the "enormous ripple effect" spot zoned projects have, since they lead to gentrification and more Ellis Act evictions. She acknowledged, however, that the 22,000 evictions were the total Ellis Act evictions since 2000, not just those triggered by spot zoning.

Opponents argued that preventing spot zoning temporarily would actually increase Ellis Act evictions during that time. Most spot zoned projects were proposed for sites on which no housing had previously existed, they noted. If developers could not build on those, they would turn instead to remodeling and rebuilding housing in older neighborhoods, with more rent controlled tenants subject to Ellis Act eviction. "[It] will leave in place the options that removed the most housing," said Josh Kamensky, a spokesman for the CPLANJ.

=== Alleged corrupt influence on planning process ===
As proof that the city government had been corrupted to the point of needing the drastic steps the initiative would take, supporters began touting a lengthy October 2016 Los Angeles Times article. It described Sea Breeze, a Torrance-area apartment project, that was approved for construction despite its proximity to several industrial sites that could adversely affect the quality of life for residents. The newspaper found that large campaign contributions to mayor Eric Garcetti and key city council members including Janice Hahn, later elected to the U.S. House, came from individuals of modest means who worked for companies connected to the project's developer, although those contributors did not recall writing checks for amounts they admitted were equal to what they earned in weeks or even months (many of which also appeared to be written by the same person regardless of whose account they were drawn on). In some cases the purported contributors were not even registered to vote. The city's planning commission had twice unanimously rejected Sea Breeze, only to be overruled by city council. To facilitate one of those votes, Garcetti had invoked a rarely used mayoral power to temporarily reduce the number of votes necessary for passage.

Opponents pointed out that for all the CPLA's complaints about corruption, the measure had no provisions addressed to limiting campaign contributions from developers. In January 2017, several city council members introduced legislation that would, in fact, have banned campaign contributions from developers with projects seeking city approval, although whether it would have passed, much less survived a court challenge, was questionable. While Measure S supporters approved of the effort, many thought it made their points about how necessary the initiative was. "It's an admission of guilt", said Sherman Oaks Homeowners Association (SOHA) president Richard Close, a supporter.

=== Possible effects of moratorium ===
The practical effect of the moratorium was another point of disagreement between the two sides. Supporters repeatedly stated that only 5% of development in the city would be halted by it, and that it would only last two years. Opponents responded that both claims were misleading. The 5% figure was based, they said, on an apparent analysis of all permits; however, they implied, most of the construction that would be allowed was improvements to existing buildings or very small-scale housing, and the 5% of blocked projects included most of the larger multi-unit proposals seeking approval. And due to the initiative's requirement that the city update its entire zoning, a process which could take longer than two years, opponents estimated it could be as long as ten years before developers felt comfortable building again.

Opponents also disputed supporters' claims that Measure S would not affect any plans for affordable housing. Instead, they claimed, 90% of those projects would not be able to be built since they would require the sort of variances the initiative would forbid for projects on those scales. One cartographer identified city-owned parking lots on which 724 units could be built, but only if the General Plan, which currently allowed only industrial use on the property, were amended, something the measure would forbid even for projects of entirely affordable housing. They also dismissed the exemption for such projects, saying that was "yet another example of 60 year old solutions to today's problems", in the CPLANJ's words.

Richard Platkin, a former city planner who strongly supported Measure S, wrote that these arguments were specious. "For nearly an entire year", he wrote in a January 2017 City Watch LA column, "I have repeatedly asked ... readers to identify any affordable housing projects that required a General Plan Amendment or even a zone change to begin construction. So far, I have only been told about one case in all of Los Angeles." He said the city's own reports confirmed this, and that the 2% of new housing that was meant for lower-income renters and buyers came about not because of any municipal action but through state laws allowing higher densities for affordable housing. Platkin further noted that the city owned 9,000 parcels on which such housing could be built, only a few of which had been so developed. "Now, suddenly, this long-ignored affordable housing option has been taken out of mothballs", he said, suggesting it was in direct response to the threat posed to developers' alleged control over City Hall by Measure S.

=== Role of transit-oriented development ===
Opponents criticized the provision forbidding the city from granting reductions of more than one-third the required parking spaces, since they said it went against the city's goals of encouraging transit-oriented development along subway lines and other major transportation corridors. The CPLA said these large parking variances did not accomplish that goal, "instead send[ing] drivers seeking parking spilling into overwhelmed neighborhoods." It claimed some residents of these developments were walking five blocks to and from their homes to parking spaces on a daily basis.

However, the CPLA had also contributed $10,000 to a campaign against November's Measure M, a county-level initiative which increased the sales tax a half-percent to pay for light rail extensions. Stewart explained that they saw transit as a "development arm". The Real Deal, another real-estate website, suggested that indicated the coalition was as opposed to transit (Note: SOHA head Richard Close, another staunch supporter of Measure S, also campaigned against Measure M, but his opposition was based on concerns that Valley residents would not get transit spending commensurate with what they contributed in increased taxes.) as it was to traffic congestion, which it frequently cited as an argument for Measure S, an argument that seemed contradictory. In an earlier interview with The Planning Report, Stewart had expressed skepticism about the role of transit in reshaping Angelenos' lives. "People who can afford to own cars continue to drive their cars", she said. "No amount of discussion will get people to give up that freedom." If the city truly wanted to reduce congestion, she suggested, it should offer tax breaks to remote workers.

Times architecture critic Christopher Hawthorne also noted that when Hollywood had updated its Community Plan in 2012 to allow for more transit-friendly development, three community groups, including Fix the city, a descendant of Not Yet New York, which had been a key force behind the similar Proposition U in 1986, successfully sued to block it. He said this pointed to "the basic hypocrisy that the authors of Measure S and other slow-growth advocates can't argue away ... Many say they're in favor of updating the community plans but fought to block one that didn't match their vision of low-rise, essentially suburban Los Angeles."

"Some clever-by-half advocates of sustainability imagine that every large and tall apartment building is automatically transit-oriented," Platkin responded to those arguments. Those that had been built near Los Angeles's subway stations, he said, were so far only transit-adjacent, since their residents still used their cars to get around (AHF head Weinstein similarly argued that "People who pay $3,800 [a month] for an apartment are not the ones who ride the subway.") Only when such development was built for lower-income tenants and residents who depended on transit to get to work, Platkin wrote, could it truly be described as transit-oriented. He allowed that Los Angeles's relationship with mass transit could indeed be reconfigured to be more like that of New York or San Francisco, but it would require improvements to the streets making them more amenable to bicyclists and pedestrians, not just high-density development near transit stops.

=== Vision of Los Angeles's future: Blade Runner vs. Her ===
There are as many possible cities as there are possible forms of human society,
but Los Angeles emphatically suggests there is no simple correlation between urban form and social form.

— Reyner Banham in Los Angeles: The Architecture of Four Ecologies

Underlying the Measure S debate were contrasting visions of the city and what direction it would take in the future. "Longtime residents of Los Angeles have in their collective imagination an image of what the city should look like and how they should live in it," D. J. Waldie, a Lakewood native and author of Holy Land, a well-regarded memoir of his youth in the planned suburb, told the Times' Thomas Curwen. "[I]t's that image that is being interfered with as the city becomes more dense. What kind of city will they see in five, 10 or 15 years?"

Contrasting visions of a future Los Angeles with higher urban density if Measure S failed

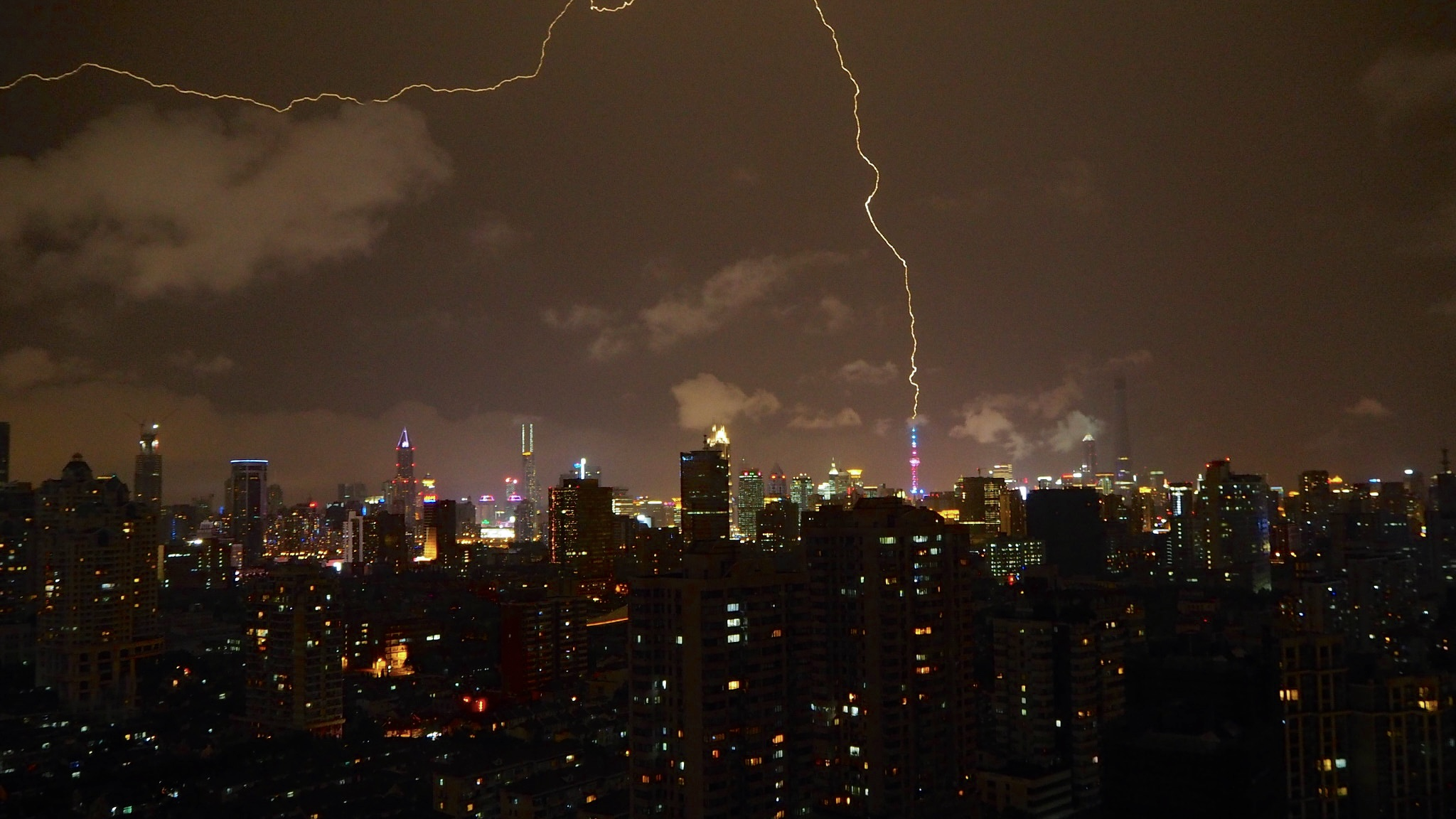
Measure S proponents often invoked Blade Runner's depiction of a dystopian future Los Angeles similar to this 2014 image of Shanghai.

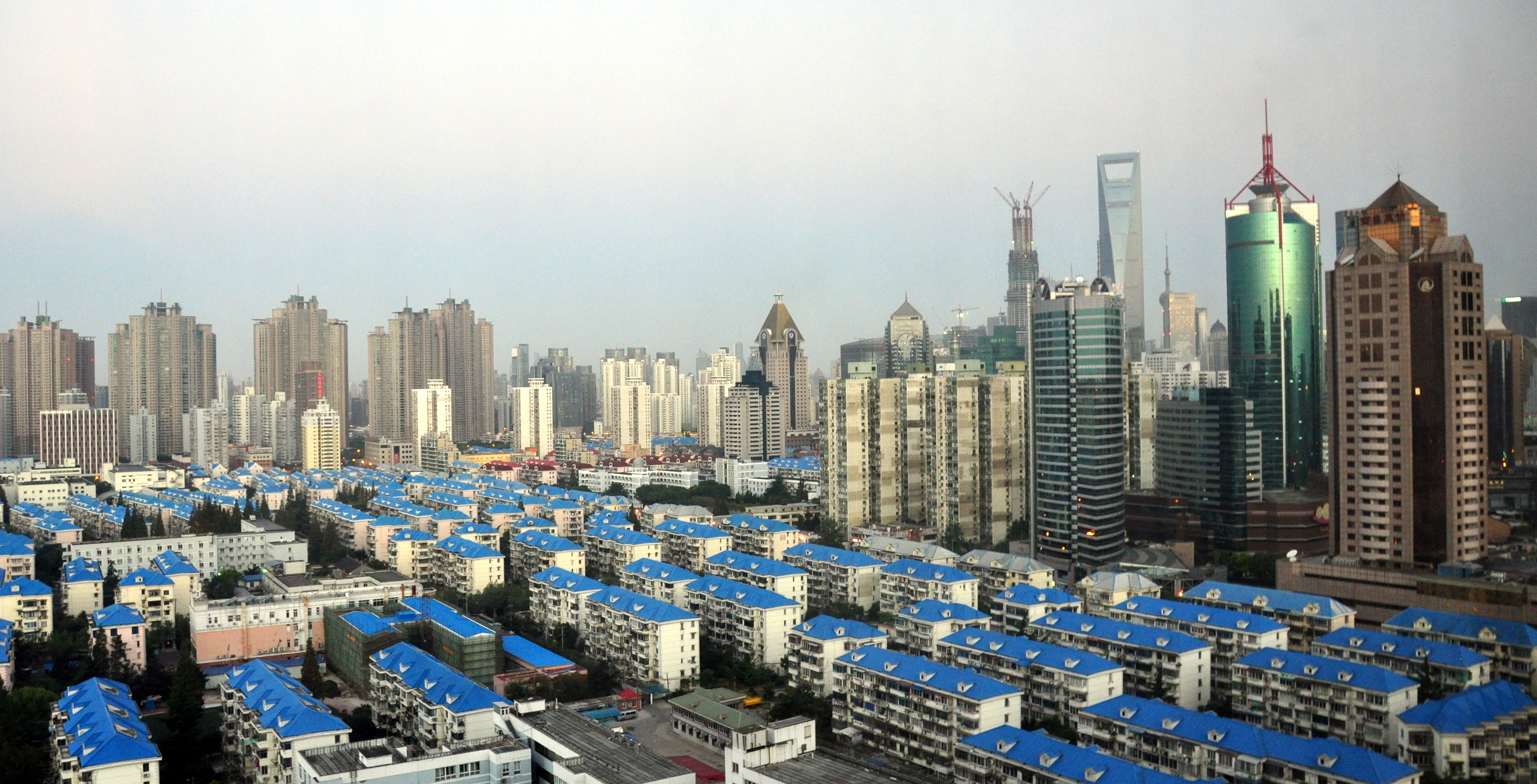
The higher-density Shanghai of the 2010s inspired Her's vision of 2030 Los Angeles

Stewart rejected any idea that the city should move in a higher-density direction. She characterized urban planners who advocated that as "stuck in a different world" and their ideal of urban living as "everyone needs to move close together and cram their children into places where there is nowhere to play. The theory that people enjoy living around the noise and congestion is wrong, and we need to respond to how people really live."

Platkin told Curwen that the real struggle, in his opinion, was not over the density of development but the role of the public in shaping it. Nonetheless, he used a cinematic reference point invoked by other proponents of Measure S. "If you have a city whose land-use policies are determined by the roller coaster of real estate speculation, you will have a city that looks like Blade Runner", referring to the seminal 1982 science fiction film set in a 2019 Los Angeles of endless skyscrapers. Another vocal Measure S proponent, Kenneth Alpern, mocked opponents as "[those] who believe that megadevelopment and a Blade Runner scenario of a sterile, overcrowded Los Angeles is WONDERFUL."

Curwen, however, contrasted that vision, frequently described as dystopian, with the 2030 Los Angeles envisioned in Spike Jonze's 2014 Best Picture-nominated Her, a vision also evoked by Curbed after Measure S's defeat. It, too, is a city of dense high-rises, realized on screen by digitally merging less recognizable elements of the thus-developed Shanghai cityscape. But its residents seem content with living that way, a lifestyle that depends far more on public transportation than it does today. "The future imagined by one generation is not necessarily the future wanted by another," he wrote. "the debate over density is challenging popular presumptions of the single-family home. Like the car, it has become a symbol of urban unsustainability."

Curwen talked to two experts who had contrasting views. Joel Kotkin, a Valley Village resident and professor at Chapman University known for his beliefs that recent proclamations of urban comeback are illusory since Americans prefer a suburban lifestyle, told him that while he did not envision downtown becoming much bigger a part of the city than it was in Indianapolis or Dallas, current development trends threatened to overwhelm the suburban aspects of Los Angeles that had made it so attractive for most of the 20th century. But Zev Yaroslavsky, who as a councilman in the mid-1980s had led the fight for Proposition U, which preserved the city's low-density character, did not see Los Angeles as having to choose. "The suburbs aren't going anywhere," he told Curwen. "I look at the changes ahead of us as additive. You now have a more urban dimension to the city of L.A."

=== Role of AHF in sponsoring initiative ===
Opponents questioned what an initiative focusing on municipal zoning had to do with the AHF's primary mission of offering treatment for AIDS patients through the pharmacies and clinics it operated. Its previous sponsorship of the successful 2012 Measure B, requiring all actors in pornographic films produced in Los Angeles County, to wear condoms during sex scenes, and Proposition 60, the unsuccessful effort to extend that prohibition to the state level after adult-film production companies left the county to avoid complying with Measure B, alienated some members of the city's LGBT community and was seen as overreach, but one still compatible with its mission. "Why the AIDS Healthcare Foundation is spending its time and money fighting battles over land-use and transportation policy is of course [an] ... excellent question", wrote Times architecture critic Christopher Hawthorne. The paper also devoted an editorial to it. "How is this social justice? How is this helping AIDS patients?" the newspaper asked. It suggested the foundation's real motivation was to block the Palladium Towers development that its head, Michael Weinstein, had complained ruined the view of the Hollywood Hills from his office.

The Times noted that as of a week before the election the AHF had spent $4.6 million on the initiative, accounting for almost all the CPLA's financial support. Dana Cuff, an urban design professor at UCLA's Luskin School, told LGBT magazine The Advocate that at best, AHF's use of the money for the initiative was "not understandable". Later she said it was "actually a misuse of their funds". A former AHF volunteer turned critic told the Times it a "blatant abuse of the[ir] resources".

During the campaign, the Los Angeles LGBT Center held a news conference not only opposing Measure S but criticizing AHF for having sponsored it. City Controller Ron Galperin said the foundation was "squandering millions of dollars" on the initiative and urged it to focus on its core mission of treating AIDS patients. Lorri Jean, director of the LGBT Center, showed the reporters demolition work that was ongoing for an affordable housing project of nearly 300 units across the street from the center's offices. The project, she said, required a zoning change from light industrial use and thus would have been impossible to build under the strictures of Measure S.

Weinstein defended the AHF's sponsorship of the initiative by reiterating that housing patients was the organization's largest priority after caring for them, and he felt the recent upsurge in luxury developments was making that harder by driving up rents. He told The Advocate that the AHF, despite its involvement in advocacy and initiatives, was still spending 96% of its billion-dollar budget on care. "We're not diverting money from patient care, but we feel that we have a responsibility to the community in which we're headquartered."

Former LA Weekly managing editor Jill Stewart, hired by the AHF as Measure S's campaign manager, was also criticized for her role since she herself lives not in the city but the affluent suburb of Calabasas, on the southwest corner of the Valley. "It's not my place to critique the merits of the place you choose to live," tech executive Stephen Corwin wrote in an open letter to Stewart in Medium, "but there's a painful irony in what you're trying to accomplish from there. How do you morally justify trying to preserve the integrity of a city you don't consider to be worthy of living in?"

== Positions ==
Besides the CPLA and CPLANJ, many local organizations devoted to the relevant issues took positions on Measure S. Some prominent individuals, mostly local elected officials and celebrities, did as well. However, many of those who did said it was hard to take sides since the measure polarized voters. "It has turned into a real civil war issue," said Joe Bray-Ali, a bicycle activist running against incumbent city councilman Gil Cedillo, who opposed the initiative. "It's been hard to have a factual argument. It's just a bizarre tangle of rhetoric and emotion."

"I completely understand the sentiment behind it," said Mitchell Schwartz, the most visible of the candidates running against Garcetti, who opposed Measure S. However, when asked by LA Weekly, he said he was unsure about it. Similarly, councilman Paul Koretz, one of the few incumbents facing a serious challenger, Jesse Creed, felt "it might light a real fire under the mayor and council's collective sense of urgency to update the community plans" but demurred when asked to take a position on the initiative, expressing concern that it could not withstand a legal challenge. Creed, who had made an issue of Koretz's support for a project by developer Rick Caruso which had also been the subject of a Times article about its possible connection to Caruso's political generosity, told the newspaper he had not yet decided where to stand on it.

=== Support ===
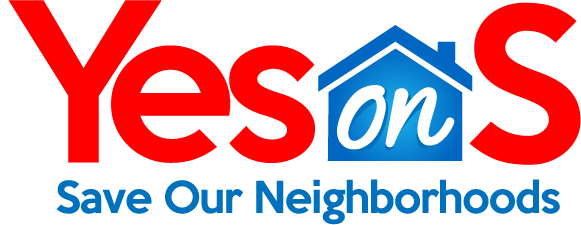

Well represented among Measure S's official endorsers were many of the homeowners' associations, and some of the neighborhood councils, which had exerted such control over city planning in the late 20th century. The groups that served Bel Air, Elysian Valley, Encino, Hollywood Hills West, Westlake South and Westwood backed the measure. Officials from some other prominent homeowners' associations, such as Richard Close of Sherman Oaks and Jeff Lynn of Van Nuys, lent their names.

Close, a land-use lawyer, called Measure S "the Proposition 13 of this generation ... We need to stop pay-to-play development". At the time he was leading opposition to a proposed redevelopment of a closed Sunkist plant in Sherman Oaks, which he said epitomized what the new initiative was intended to stop. Noting that propositions 13 and U, both of which he had played a leading role in, built crucial early support in the San Fernando Valley, he said, that area's support would be essential to Measure S's passage. "Political action starts in the Valley. It aims to change this city." Close believed Measure S would pass overwhelmingly, since voters were even angrier about the underlying issues than they had been during the campaign for Proposition U.

Some local environmental organizations supported Measure S. Among them were the Los Angeles and San Fernando Valley chapters of the Audubon Society and the Federation of Hillside and Canyon Associations. The Ballona Wetlands Institute also supported the initiative. Its executive director personally endorsed it, as did a number of local environmental lawyers.

Richard Riordan, who as the city's mayor during the 1990s had pushed for the creation of the neighborhood councils which critics blamed for further limiting the city's growth, was the most prominent of the former elected officials to endorse Measure S. "Do we want to continue allowing rule-breaking developers to do as they please? I don't think so", he wrote in a Times op-ed. "Los Angeles is better than this." Other onetime elected officials who supported the initiative included former congresswoman Diane Watson, former state senate majority leader Gloria Romero and former city councilman Dennis Zine.

As often is the case with political issues in Los Angeles, some well-known actors joined their names to the cause. The CPLA in August 2016 announced that Kirsten Dunst, Joaquin Phoenix, Chris Pine and Chloë Sevigny were supporters. Leonardo DiCaprio and Garrett Hedlund were also mentioned, but the coalition later removed their names after their publicists said they had not, in fact, formally announced their support.

=== Opposition ===
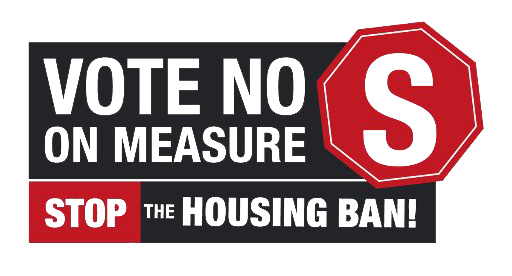

The Los Angeles political and business establishment uniformly opposed Measure S. At City Hall, Mayor Eric Garcetti and City Controller Ron Galperin were joined by 10 of the city's 14 incumbent councilmembers in urging voters to reject the measure. Four county supervisors—Janice Hahn, Sheila Kuehl, Mark Ridley-Thomas and Hilda Solis—also expressed opposition. Governor Jerry Brown led state officials, including state senator Ricardo Lara and several of the assemblymembers from Los Angeles, in coming out against Measure S. They were also joined by U.S. Representatives Tony Cárdenas and Brad Sherman. To dramatize why they were opposed, Garcetti and other officials, along with representatives of opposed groups, held a rally at the 100-unit Casa Heiwa affordable housing development in Little Tokyo, a project that had required a zoning change and General Plan amendment when built in 1996. Thus, they argued, it would have been prevented by Measure S.

Both the county's Democratic and Republican parties formally opposed Measure S. Democratic organizations representing the San Fernando Valley and Westside also joined them. The county Green Party also came against Measure S, calling it "a blunt instrument that would prevent desperately needed affordable housing from being built in the near term, while guaranteeing nothing about the future ecological orientation and affordability of new development."

Business groups, including many local Chambers of Commerce, landlords and realtors' groups, campaigned against the initiative. A broad coalition of labor unions, including the county building trades council and individual construction union locals, along with public employees such as the city's police and fire unions, were also opposed. The American Civil Liberties Union also expressed its opposition.

Environmental activist groups, chief among them the Natural Resources Defense Council and the Los Angeles League of Conservation Voters, expressed opposition as well. Many organizations that advocated for the homeless and affordable housing joined them. Father Greg Boyle, founder of job-training nonprofit Homeboy Industries, who had supported Measure S while supporters were still gathering signatures for it, withdrew his support several days later, saying he had only given it after two friends recommended he do so and, after reading the measure, was convinced it would not ease the city's housing crisis.

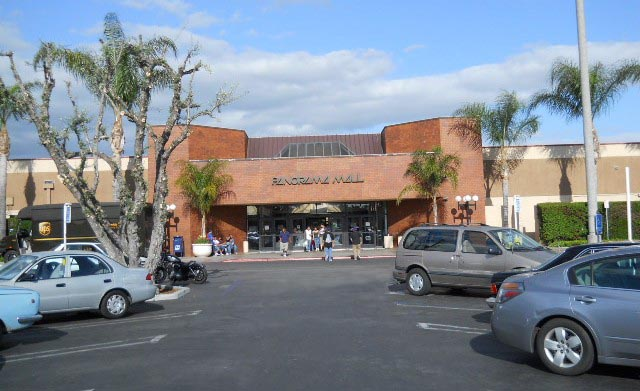
Opponents of Measure S feared it would prevent redevelopment of the Panorama Mall.

None of the city's homeowners' associations opposed Measure S, but neighborhood councils in Central Hollywood, Olympic Park, Palms, Panorama City and Richard Close's home neighborhood of Sherman Oaks did. "It's a tale of two Valleys," said Councilwoman Nury Martinez, challenging Close's narrative. She pointed to the redevelopment of a former Montgomery Ward and the expansion of a shopping mall near her home in Panorama City, both "desperately needed and desired", as the sort of development that the initiative would imperil, since they depended on parking variances. "It literally took 20 years to get developers interested in these areas," she said. "Measure S punishes communities like this one."

The Los Angeles Times strongly opposed Measure S, even before it had qualified for the ballot. In April 2016 it ran an op-ed by Conor Friedersdorf, a staff writer for The Atlantic and city resident. Likening the proposed moratorium to the Mexican border fence proposed by Donald Trump, then seeking the Republican presidential nomination, he said the initiative would "wall off this city from newcomers on behalf of homeowners who don't want more traffic on 'their' streets." A month before the election, the paper ran an editorial urging Angelenos to vote no on S, calling it "a childish middle finger to City Hall." The city's other daily newspaper, the Los Angeles Daily News, also recommended voters reject it, saying that the legitimate issues it raised did not require a moratorium to solve.

== Campaign ==
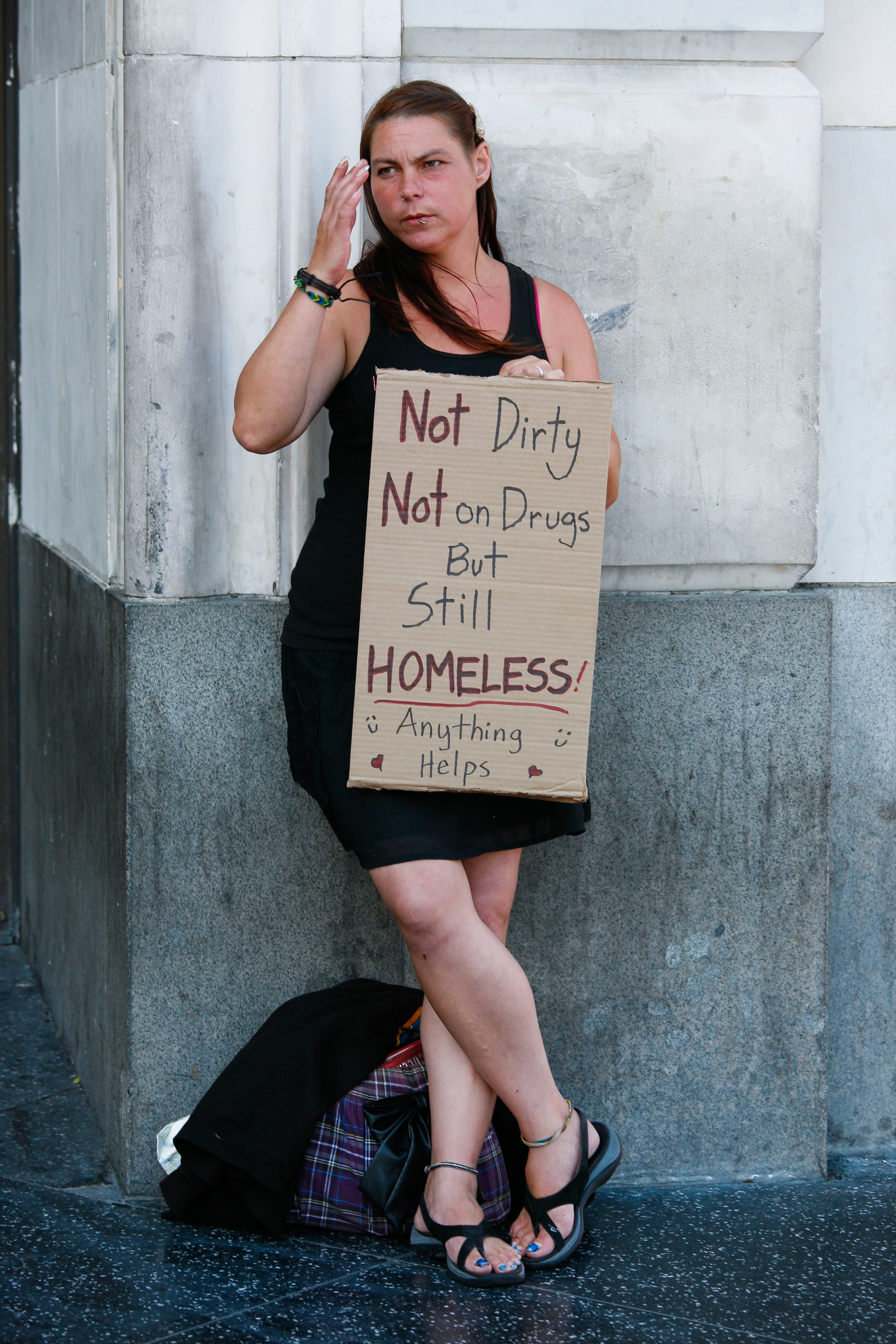
Increasing homelessness in the city was one of the concerns motivating Measure S.

As soon as council placed the initiative on the ballot, supporters and opponents staked out their positions. Stewart said that it would allow 95% of development proposed at that time to proceed "while the greediest 5 percent of developers are put on a timeout while we force the City Council to come up with a real plan for Los Angeles". Speaking against the measure, Los Angeles Area Chamber of Commerce chief executive officer Gary Toebben told the Los Angeles Business Journal that the measure "goes way too far", which would become opponents' main argument against it, to the point of becoming the URL of their website. "[It] means moving hundreds of thousands of Angelenos one step closer to homelessness," he said, alluding to a recent increase in the city's homeless population over the last several years despite slow population growth and general economic prosperity. The CPLA, attributing that increase to what it said were thousands of evictions of rent-stabilized tenants by developers looking to build the high-density luxury housing Measure S was meant to curtail, endorsed Measure HHH, a bond issue on the upcoming ballot that would raise $1.2 billion and commit it to buying property on which facilities for the homeless would be built.

=== Comparisons to Trump campaign and presidency ===
Both sides on Measure S were primarily composed of liberals and progressives, often in ethnic or social groups that identified politically with the Democratic Party, which overwhelmingly dominates politics in Los Angeles. As such, supporters and opponents of the initiative compared the other side to recently elected Republican president Donald Trump in their rhetoric, often suggesting that "billionaires" supported the other side. The CPLA observed that the city's top developers had contributed to Trump's campaign, although none of them had supported the CPLANJ financially, whereas Crescent Heights, the lead contributor to that organization, had not given any money to Trump. In response, the CPLANJ reminded voters that prominent S supporter Richard Riordan, the city's last Republican mayor, had also endorsed Trump (although only after his nomination—Riordan had previously called Trump "crazy").

Richard Close, the influential SOHA head and a strong supporter of Measure S, believed Trump's victory augured for the success of the initiative, although he, too, had not voted for the president. "It tells me that the public is frustrated, mad, and believes that any change is better than the status quo. That"s the perfect ingredient for ... the enactment of the Neighborhood Integrity Initiative in March," he told Los Angeles magazine at the beginning of 2017.

Several opponents of Measure S not only compared supporters' rhetoric to Trump, but followed Conor Friedersdorf's lead in likening the initiative itself to the policies Trump had promised when campaigning. The Times itself called proponents' arguments "positively Trumpian" in an editorial, an argument similar to one made in an open letter to Yes on S campaign manager Jill Stewart by tech executive Stephen Corwin. In a follow-up post, Corwin reacted to one of the pro-S mailers by comparing Measure S to Brexit, the 2016 referendum in which British voters decided their country should leave the European Union, and Stewart herself to Brexit advocate Nigel Farage, since, he argued, she made similar promises on behalf of the measure that, like Farage, she and supporters would have to renege on after it passed. Abundant Housing LA likened the Yes on S arguments to the "alternative facts" claimed by Trump advisor Kellyanne Conway in response to unfavorable news coverage of the administration.

=== Billboards ===
The CPLA tried to reach voters primarily through outdoor advertising, a strategy that the AHF had used to pass Measure B, requiring the use of condoms during penetrative sex scenes in adult films made in Los Angeles County, in 2012, and again for the previous fall's unsuccessful Proposition 60, which would have extended Measure B statewide, and Proposition 61 attempting to limit the price the state paid for prescription drugs. Many of the billboards AHF had used for those campaigns as well as public service announcements warning gay men against the prevalence of sexually transmitted diseases were, during the last months of 2017, converted to "Yes on S" messages. Ultimately 120 billboards, many in the city's affluent Westside, promoted Measure S, an amount opponents said was far in excess of any other recent political campaign.

The owners of the iconic "Welcome to Silver Lake" sign at Sunset Junction also repainted it with a pro-Measure S message. They had been fighting a proposed nearby development, which would not have needed a zoning change and thus would not have been put on hold by the moratorium. Some opponents of the initiative who lived in the area resented the appropriation of a local landmark, but most felt it was the owners' right to do as they pleased with the sign. A member of the local neighborhood council, however, complained that the owners spelled Silver Lake as one word in contravention of a requirement that the space be used.

=== Conflicts with Measure JJJ ===
In November city voters considered Measure JJJ, addressing some of the same issues as Measure S. It required that 20% of developments requiring zoning variances be set aside for affordable housing, that local labor be used on them, and incentivized developers for building near the city's subway lines. The city's business community, particularly developers, were as opposed to it as they were to Measure S.

However, so was the CPLA. In a news release strongly opposing JJJ, it claimed that initiative had been "cooked up" by the interests opposing Measure S in an effort to split its support and keep it from the ballot. Measure S proponents said that they considered JJJ likely to fall short of its goals, pointing to what they considered broadly worded loopholes in JJJ. "Ultimately there's a way out, every single time, for developers," Stewart told the Times.

The Los Angeles Tenants' Union (LATU), a group representing renters and their rights throughout the city, publicly opposed Measure JJJ and supported Measure S. "We've been overrun, and nobody has had the strength or the ability to get political control over this bad land use and extreme overdevelopment," said one LATU member in a CPLA news release announcing the endorsement. Both groups argued that JJJ would encourage the demolition of older, more affordable housing in favor of luxury condominiums. "People's dreams are dashed to make way for City Hall's horribly conceived urban cleansing," said Stewart. She praised the LATU for its refusal to take money from the city or developers, in contrast to other housing rights groups she did not name.

Local building trades union leaders who had been among the primary backers of Measure JJJ expressed concern that Measure S, if passed, would largely negate it through its moratorium. Lawyers also said that despite standard "poison pill" language in both initiatives giving precedence to any other initiative receiving more votes should there be a conflict between any aspect of either initiative, that question was not likely be resolved without litigation should both of them pass. Measure JJJ ultimately passed with the support of 64% of the voters.

=== Voter guide lawsuit ===
In late December a citizen backed by the CPLA brought suit against the CPLANJ over a statement it submitted for inclusion in the guidebook sent out to voters. It routinely includes short arguments for and against the ballot measure, often prepared by advocacy groups. The suit argued that the adverse economic impacts of the measure claimed by a study paid for the CPLANJ yet represented by it in its documents as independent were based on a ten-year period instead of the two years the moratorium was intended to last.

Shortly after the new year, the suit was settled when CPLANJ agreed to drop the claim that the study was independent and scale back some of its other claims based on a two-year time period. Both sides claimed victory. The CPLANJ said that by agreeing to the new wording the CPLA was agreeing to the claims that it would cost the city 24,000 jobs, while Stewart claimed that CPLANJ was tacitly admitting its arguments could not hold up in court.

=== Deceptive mailers ===
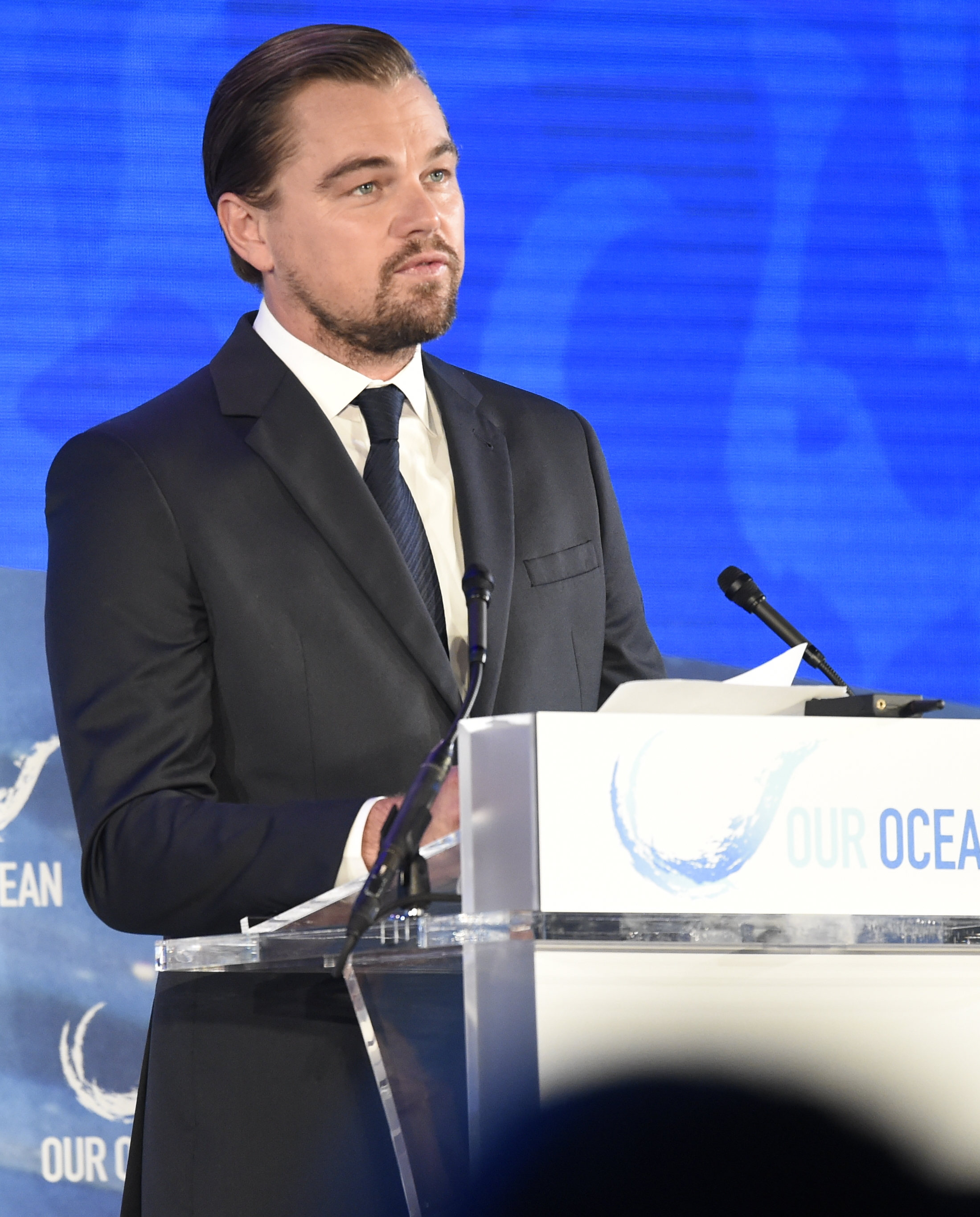
Despite claims by the CPLA that he supported Measure S, actor Leonardo DiCaprio did not.

In October 2016 CPLA formally retracted a claim that actor Leonardo DiCaprio supported Measure S, after environmentalists criticized him for a stance in favor of lower-density housing at odds with his general support for environmental causes. Stewart, who took responsibility for the mistake, said she had spoken with the actor's publicists two months earlier and "I thought we had received final word" at that time. One of those publicists said DiCaprio took no position on Measure S.

The real estate website Curbed Los Angeles, which had broken the story, learned from DiCaprio that all he had done for CPLA was to sign a petition to save an unidentified historic building. Curbed attempted to learn whether he had actually signed the petition to get the initiative on the ballot, but was told by the city clerk's office that those signatures are not public record. The website said this raised the possibility that some of those signatures could have been obtained under a pretense (as tech executive Stephen Corwin claimed he had witnessed), or that DiCaprio had signed on to support the measure without fully understanding what it entailed.

In February, the CPLA sent out a mailer to voters that had on one side a picture of a smiling Garcetti, his signature and the quote "I Agree". The other showed a letter written by him on city letterhead, with "I agree" following many pro-Measure S talking points. It was headed "Mayor Garcetti finds a lot to like about Measure S".

The mailer implied that Garcetti supported Measure S, which in fact he strongly opposed. He called it a "dirty trick". A CPLA spokesperson said in response that "[t]his was just a friendly reminder on what these City Hall insiders promised and what they've yet to deliver to the voters of Los Angeles."

A week before the vote, an editorial in the Los Angeles Times criticized the CPLA for its misrepresentative mailers. It also noted that many of the mailers had included quotations from other Times editorials in support of the measure. However, the editorial noted, as with the Garcetti mailer those mailers had not stated that the newspaper had consistently opposed the measure.

The claims of support by opponents was not the only aspect of the CPLA mailers that led to accusations of deception. One mailer depicted a neighborhood of affordable housing that, the CPLA claimed, could have been built under Measure S. However, a Curbed reporter found that it was actually located in Torrance, outside Los Angeles's municipal boundaries.

=== Eviction-notice mailer ===
In late February the CPLA sent out another controversial mailer. This one appeared to be an eviction notice, using the same format as real ones, although there was small print identifying it as a paid political advertisement and the line with the purported case number was filled in with "This could be you or a loved one!" Tenants' organizations received calls from worried members who thought they were real, leading the head of one such group to call the CPLA "outrageous and irresponsible". The Los Angeles County Sheriff's Department, whose name was on the mailer, wrote to CPLA demanding they cease and desist from using their name, or at least follow up and tell recipients the mailer was not an actual eviction notice.

"We appreciate the county of Los Angeles giving the Yes on S campaign some last-minute critical media attention, on our key issue: that developers of luxury towers evict poor and working-class Angelenos every day," Stewart responded. A leader of one tenant group, the Eviction Defense Network, agreed, calling the tactic "forceful". Stewart further speculated that the sheriff might have been acting at the behest of opponents of Measure S, since they had used the same political consulting firm. Later the CPLA refused to retract the mailer, calling it protected political speech, and expressing doubt that anyone could seriously have assumed it was an actual eviction notice.

== Vote ==
Since the mayoral race, as well as most of the council contests, was not seriously contested, Measure S was the most closely followed vote on the night of March 7, due to the amount spent by both sides on advertising and messaging.

Early returns after the polls closed showed a huge advantage for "No" votes. With less than 5% of the precincts reporting, almost 60% of voters had registered their opposition. "We don't like the looks of the early returns", Stewart told the Times. She nevertheless held out hope that something "amazing" could turn things around.

Shortly after midnight, with more than half the vote in, the opposition margin had increased further. Losing by a 2–1 ratio, the CPLA conceded defeat. When all votes had been counted, more than 70% of Angelenos had rejected Measure S. LA Weekly noted that was a wider margin of defeat than Measure N, an initiative to restrict the city's ability to tax and regulate cannabis sales, whose supporters had never campaigned for it and indeed abandoned it weeks before the election. Turnout was 20% of the electorate, low but still almost twice as high as in the mayoral election.

The votes against Measure S came from all over the city. A post-election analysis by the Times, with an accompanying showed only isolated areas of support, with no neighborhood supporting the initiative outright. Many of these precincts were small, some with fewer than 10 votes cast, leading the newspaper not to publish totals or margins for privacy reasons. These areas were small portions of downtown, Echo Park, Fairfax, Koreatown, Valley Glen and the large southern area of Westchester mostly given over to Los Angeles International Airport.

For precincts where there had been enough to display results, in those scattered areas where Measure S won its margin of victory was narrow, around 51–52%, often a difference of less than ten actual votes. Other than a few blocks of Silver Lake, and part of Watts, most of these areas were in the Valley: portions of Chatsworth, Granada Hills, North Hills, Northridge, Shadow Hills and Sun Valley. Measure S did best in the southwestern corner of Boyle Heights, with 55% of the vote, and collected 8 out of 12 total votes in part of San Pedro.

In the majority of Los Angeles, where votes against Measure S prevailed, the margin was much higher. Many of these areas were on the Westside, where the billboards promoting the initiative had been most concentrated. Some precincts there recorded margins far above the city average against S, in the 70–80% range; in one between National Boulevard and the Santa Monica Freeway at the south boundary of Castle Heights, the margin of defeat was 87%. Opposition was strongest in Westwood: 89% of the precinct that includes the UCLA campus voted no, and 92% of an off-campus area to the northwest voted against Measure S.

=== Reaction ===
Opponents expressed relief. "Defeating Measure S has spared our city from a future that would've meant fewer jobs, fewer funds for critical public services, fewer new homes for those who desperately need them, and even less affordable rents," according to Rusty Hicks of the county Federation of Labor. "[P]eople understood the devastating impact [it] would have on our community if it passed," said Los Angeles Area Chamber of Commerce president Gary Toebben.

Weinstein, whose AHF had sponsored the measure, remained upbeat. "This campaign will go down in the record books as one of the most successful campaigns that did not actually win the vote," he said. Despite losing the vote, he observed, City Council had begun taking some actions supporters wanted. "We are going to hold City Hall's feet to the fire on these issues ... Los Angeles will be a better place to live as a result of the Yes on S campaign." Ileana Wachtel, a CPLA spokeswoman, attributed the initiative's loss to the city establishment's opposition. "It's tough to fight the status quo and it's tough to fight really wealthy developers."

"I think it's great for the city," said the freshly re-elected Mayor Garcetti, as he was walking through Larchmont Village the next morning, when asked about the failure of Measure S. "We're not going to lose momentum on building housing, and I think that doesn't come at the expense of our neighborhoods." Developers, however, said the fact that the initiative had gotten on the ballot in the first place showed them that there was a strong enough belief that they had captured the city's planning process, and as a result they were not planning any large projects until the city had made progress updating its zoning as the measure's proponents had intended.

"Many expected [Measure S] to lose," LA Weekly wrote, "but few imagined it would lose by so much." SOHA president Richard Close, who had two months earlier expressed confidence that it would triumph, admitted the wide margin of defeat came as a surprise to him. "I think the takeaway is that the homeowners in Los Angeles no longer have the political clout they once had."

Opponents readily agreed. "Voters didn't reject pay-to-play," said Stuart Waldman, president of the Valley Industry & Commerce Association, another business group that had worked against the initiative. "[They] rejected NIMBYism", referring to the common acronym for "not in my backyard", used pejoratively for opponents of development such as the supporters of Measure S. "They are sick of angry, wealthy homeowners who don't want people moving into their neighborhood, driving into their neighborhood, or parking in their neighborhood", which he said described the members of Close's organization.

=== Analysis ===
Searching for an explanation of Measure S's spectacular failure, LA Weekly first noted that unlike the similar growth-slowing Proposition U in 1986, which had been sponsored by councilmen Zev Yaroslavsky and Marvin Braude after their colleagues refused to block large-scale development in their districts, no sitting elected official had supported Measure S. And its major proponent, AHF head Weinstein, was a polarizing figure. "He's not somebody that could get tens of thousands of people to charge after him," explained Raphael Sonenshein, a public-affairs professor at California State University, Los Angeles.

Sonenshein also wondered if the election of Trump and the associated populism underlying it had actually worked against Measure S, rather than in its favor as Close believed it would. While he agreed that those feelings had been present in the wake of the presidential election, since Trump's inauguration the growing opposition to his presidency in the city and nationwide provided a more attractive outlet for that anger. "It's kind of hard to have a rebellion in those conditions," Sonenshein said. "There's already a rebellion going on."

Martin Cooper, a public relations executive and historian of the Valley who had supported Measure S, said it failed because opponents got their message across about what the city stood to lose more effectively than supporters were able to explain how it would work. "The reasons it lost were two reasons the opposition explained well: money and jobs", he told the Daily News. "It was not a coincidence that Mayor Garcetti's victory party was held at a union hall."

== Aftermath ==
More than the fact of Measure S's defeat, the scale of it convinced many observers that it marked a significant turning point in the history of the city. "[It] represents a significant break with 50 years of resistance to growth in Los Angeles," Waldie told LA Weekly, which itself called the vote "a confirmation that the city wants to become more urbanized, more dense, less reliant on the automobile, more inclusive and, perhaps, a more unified city." Times architecture critic Christopher noted that Measure S was opposed by roughly the same percentage of voters who had supported Measure M the previous fall, which led him to call the vote "a very strong mandate for a new and more urban L.A.", which he called the Third L.A., emerging as the Second L.A. championed by supporters of the failed initiative continued to break down amid the new realities of the 21st century.

"Los Angeles is starting to feel like a great world city," David C. Martin, architect of the Wilshire Grand Center, now the city's tallest building, had said before the vote. William Fulton, author of The Reluctant Metropolis, an acclaimed history of the city, said the title of his book no longer applied. "Los Angeles really has undergone an unbelievable shift," he said, "between older homeowners, who don't see why growth is good for them, and younger folks, who can't afford $800,000 for a starter home."

While Curbed pointed out that voters may have rejected Measure S for a variety of reasons, it did indeed constitute a mandate for the city's future when taken together with Measure M. However, it said that mandate was more focused on access to mass transit and walkability than density. "Measure S was the last, gasping attempt at trying to convince us that LA will never give up its cars," the site wrote.

Curbed nevertheless cautioned that the defeat of Measure S was "not a starter pistol to commence building the supertall LA of Her." Activists on both sides of the debate agreed. "Defeating Measure S doesn't solve anything," said Damien Newton, the founder of Streetsblog LA. "[We can't say] the status quo is fine." In a CityWatch LA essay two days after the election, Jill Stewart wrote that "while our reforms failed, Measure S won the argument." She pointed to the thousands of Angelenos who voted for it, and said the campaign believed it was a much closer race before opponents began spending and Governor Brown came out against it. The real issue, she said, always had been the level of public participation in city government. "This is far more fundamental. It's about who decides how and where LA's infrastructure, housing, parks and services are planned and intertwined, as required, to best serve residents."

== See also ==
- History of Los Angeles
- Timeline of Los Angeles
- Urban planning in the United States
