= Abundant Housing LA =

US nonprofit housing affordability organization

- Abbreviation: AHLA
- Formation: July 27, 2016; 10 years ago (Note: Abundant Housing LA held its first public meetings in 2016 and was formally incorporated in 2018.)
- Founders: Brent Gaisford and Mark Vallianatos
- Legal status: 501(c)(4)
- Purpose: Housing affordability
- Headquarters: Los Angeles, California, U.S.
- Region served: Los Angeles County
- Key people: Azeen Khanmalek (Executive Director)
- Website: https://abundanthousingla.org/

Abundant Housing LA is a nonprofit organization advocating for more abundant housing across all affordability levels to address the housing shortage in Southern California.

As a 501(c)(4) entity, it engages in charitable and political activities, including support for pro-housing candidates. It works with the Abundant Housing LA Education Fund (a related 501(c)(3)) to represent the YIMBY (Yes in My Backyard) movement in Los Angeles.

== History ==
Abundant Housing LA (AHLA) was founded in 2016 by a group of volunteers and housing advocates to address the rising rents and limited housing supply in Los Angeles. It was co-founded by urban planner Mark Vallianatos, who served as its initial Policy Director, and Brent Gaisford, who served as its initial Director. Initially, it hosted public meetings and supported new housing projects through letter-writing campaigns. By the end of 2016, AHLA had established a steering committee and begun to actively participate in housing policy discussions and advocacy in Los Angeles, and by mid 2017 had more than 900 members.

In early 2017, AHLA became involved in local housing policy when it contributed to the defeat of Measure S, an anti-development ballot initiative.

In 2018, the group led advocacy work to upzone a single-family neighborhood on the westside of Los Angeles to allow apartment development as part of the Expo Line Transit Neighborhood Plan.

In 2019, following a grant from the LA2050 challenge, AHLA transitioned to a formal organizational structure and appointed Leonora Camner as its Executive Director while Brent Gaisford stepped down as Director and became chair of the board. In December 2023, Azeen Khanmalek succeeded Leonara Camner as the Executive Director.

== Advocacy ==
At the state level, Abundant Housing LA has aligned with a broader coalition of pro-housing groups to support legislation that accelerates housing production. The group advocated for California's transit-oriented housing bills, including SB 827 in 2018 and its successor SB 50 in 2019, which proposed overriding certain local zoning laws to allow mid-rise apartment construction near transit hubs. In 2025, Abundant Housing LA officially co-sponsored and advocated for SB 79, a bill authored by State Senator Scott Wiener that legalizes apartment buildings within a half-mile radius of major transit stops across California. They joined California YIMBY, Streets For All, Inner City Law Center, Greenbelt Alliance, SPUR, and the Bay Area Council in co-sponsoring this transit-oriented development bill.

When the Los Angeles City Council opposed SB 50, Abundant Housing LA joined California YIMBY in publicly advocating for the bill, arguing that zoning reforms were necessary to address the region's housing shortage. In 2022, Abundant Housing LA co-sponsored Assembly Bill 2097, which became law and eliminated minimum parking requirements for new developments near transit areas. The bill, which became law, restricts local governments from enforcing parking mandates in transit-rich zones, with the objective of reducing construction costs and promoting housing development.

In addition, AHLA has supported streamlining laws like SB 35 and other bills that promote accessory dwelling units (ADUs) and limit exclusionary zoning.
