= Jill Stewart =

Jill Stewart was the Managing Editor at LA Weekly and laweekly.com. At LA Weekly, she oversaw a team of print and digital journalists who pursue the newspaper's brand of digital hyper-localism and analytical, print journalism. She also oversaw the newspaper's video team and video productions.

Jill Stewart is an experienced television commentator, providing regular live political analysis for KCET Public TV during the 2013 L.A. mayoral race, KTTV Fox 11 during the 2010 California gubernatorial race, and KCAL 9 during the 2005 L.A. mayoral race. She was seen on CNN, MSNBC, and Fox News Channel during the 2003 recall of California Gov. Gray Davis, and she provided live analysis of California and national issues for The Dennis Miller Show and Politically Incorrect with Bill Maher.

Her radio work includes hundreds of appearances as guest or host on BBC Radio, KNX Newsradio, 790 TalkRadio KABC, KFI AM 640, KPCC Public Radio, KCRW and KGO Newstalk. She was a frequent commentator on the local radio show AirTalk, on Pasadena City College's NPR radio station, KPCC.

== Biography ==
She holds a master's degree in journalism from Stanford University and an undergraduate degree from The Evergreen State College.

From 1984 through 1991, she was a metro reporter with the Los Angeles Times, where she focused on urban affairs, poverty, affordable housing, the environment and government.

During 1991 and 1992, she lived in Prague and wrote about Czechoslovakia's transition to democracy for "Editor & Publisher" and others. After returning to Los Angeles in 1992, she was tapped by now-defunct Buzz magazine to write its Power Brokers column focusing on Southern California's most influential elected and business leaders and institutions.

From 1996 through 2003, she authored a weekly commentary column on Los Angeles, Southern California, and Sacramento politics for the now-defunct alternative newspaper New Times LA. According to Stewart, "That 'acerbic, iconoclastic' column propelled her into the public conscious and made her a 'must-read for many in town', particularly the LA power elite." According to Stewart, "from 2003 to late 2006, she wrote a syndicated column on California politics that ran in the San Francisco Chronicle, Los Angeles Daily News, Orange County Register, Long Beach Press-Telegram and several other newspapers, reaching an audience of 1 million readers."

She joined LA Weekly in 2006 as its news editor and was promoted to the managing editor's job in 2012. She is a longtime, occasional op-ed contributor to The New York Times and The Wall Street Journal.

Between 1999 and 2013, she served for several years on the Los Angeles Press Club Board of Directors and became president of the board, which oversees a non-profit enterprise dedicated to bringing journalists together to improve the industry and reach out to non-journalists.

In 2016–17, she was campaign director for the Coalition to Preserve Los Angeles in its attempt to get the anti-development Measure S passed.

== Awards and honors ==
Stewart has twice been named top columnist in Los Angeles at the Southern California Journalism Awards, and she has been honored with its Journalist of the Year award. Her national honors include the American Society of Newspaper Columnists' award for best column in the U.S. and the Benjamin Fine Award for top education writing in the nation.
