= Proposition U =

Referendum in Los Angeles, California, USA

Proposition U was a ballot initiative for the city of Los Angeles. Proposed by Zev Yaroslavsky, Joel Wachs, and Marvin Braude, and placed on the ballot in November 1986, Prop. U aimed to slow development in the city. Voters approved Prop. U by a 2-1 margin. The passage of the ballot initiative halved the allowable residential density throughout much of Los Angeles.

== Aim ==
Prop. U aimed to slow the development of high rises in the city. While the downtown business core was exempt from Prop. U, the proposition established density levels for other areas of the city. Prop. U also specifically reduced the allowable size of new buildings on 70-85 percent of the commercial and industrial areas of Los Angeles by one-half.

== Supporters and critics ==
Prop. U was supported by local political groups, such as Not Yet New York, as well as community activists such as Gerald Silver. Although Prop. U had no organized opposition, critics included developers and members of the city council, who argued that the measure would cost jobs. In an opinion piece for the Los Angeles Times, one critic called the measure too broad.

== Passage ==
Seven out of ten LA voters voted "yes" on Prop. U. Passage was strongest in South-Central and East Los Angeles.

== Legacy ==
Prop. U is still considered a core rule by which builders in the Los Angeles area have to abide when constructing new office buildings, but limits for residential construction were eased by the passage of Measure JJJ (2016), which encourages density and affordable housing near transit hubs. Prop. U's limits on residential construction were ultimately superseded near transit hubs by California Senate Bill 79, which sets state baseline zoning near public transport.

A 2023 study found that the passage of Proposition U just before the opening of the Los Angeles Metro Rail substantially undercut the viability of Metro Rail by restricting dense residential housing near transit stations.

== See also ==
- Measure S, failed 2017 initiative proposing similar limits on development in the city
- Abundant and Affordable Homes Near Transit Act, 2025 state law which increases density near transit stations in Los Angeles and other counties
