= California Senate Bill 79 =

Housing and zoning law in California

California State Legislature
- Full name: An act to add Chapter 4.1.5 (commencing with Section 65912.155) to Division 1 of Title 7 of the Government Code, relating to land use.
- Introduced: January 15, 2025
- Assembly voted: September 11, 2025 (43-19-18)
- Senate voted: June 3, 2025 (21–13–6) September 12, 2025 (21-8-11)
- Signed into law: October 10, 2025
- Sponsor(s): Wiener (S), Haney (A), Lee (A), Wicks (A)
- Governor: Gavin Newsom
- Code: Government Code
- Section: 65912.155–65912.162
- Bill: California Senate Bill 79
- Associated bills: Planning and Zoning Law, California Housing Accountability Act
- Website: Bill Information

Status: Current legislation

California Senate Bill 79 (SB 79), titled the Abundant and Affordable Homes Near Transit Act, is a 2025 California law that legalizes the construction of multi-story multi-family housing within one-half mile (0.80 km) of public transit stations by preempting local government control of land zoning in the intervening area.

SB 79 and preceding bills have been authored by state senator Scott Wiener and have been sponsored by California YIMBY, a pro-housing lobbying group, while they have been opposed by local governments, anti-gentrification activists, and suburban homeowners. The bills are written in support of transit-oriented development in response to an ongoing housing affordability crisis in California's largest urban areas.

Wiener first introduced the bill in January 2018 as Senate Bill 827 (SB 827), which would have applied to areas within one-half-mile (0.8 km) of frequent transit corridors, including rail stations and bus routes, as well as jobs centers. SB 827 failed to advance from the Senate Transportation and Housing Committee in April 2018, effectively killing it. In 2019 and 2020, Senator Wiener attempted to pass California Senate Bill 50 (SB 50), a revised successor to SB 827, multiple times both in committee and on the senate floor, culminating in an unsuccessful floor vote on January 31, 2020, which resulted in the bill's demise. A light-touch version, Senate Bill 902 (SB 902), passed the Senate in 2020 but died in the Assembly Appropriations Committee. SB 79 was introduced by Wiener in the 2025 session, where it passed in both houses.

The 2021 California HOME Act (drafted by Wiener) and 2022 AB 2097 (drafted by Laura Friedman), both signed into law by Newsom, accomplished some of the same aims as SB 827 and SB 50, by allowing lot splits of single-family houses up to four units per lot (regardless of single-family zoning) as well as banning parking minimums within one-half mile (0.80 km) of transit stops, respectively.

On October 10, 2025, SB 79 was signed into law by Governor Gavin Newsom and took effect on July 1, 2026.

== Background ==
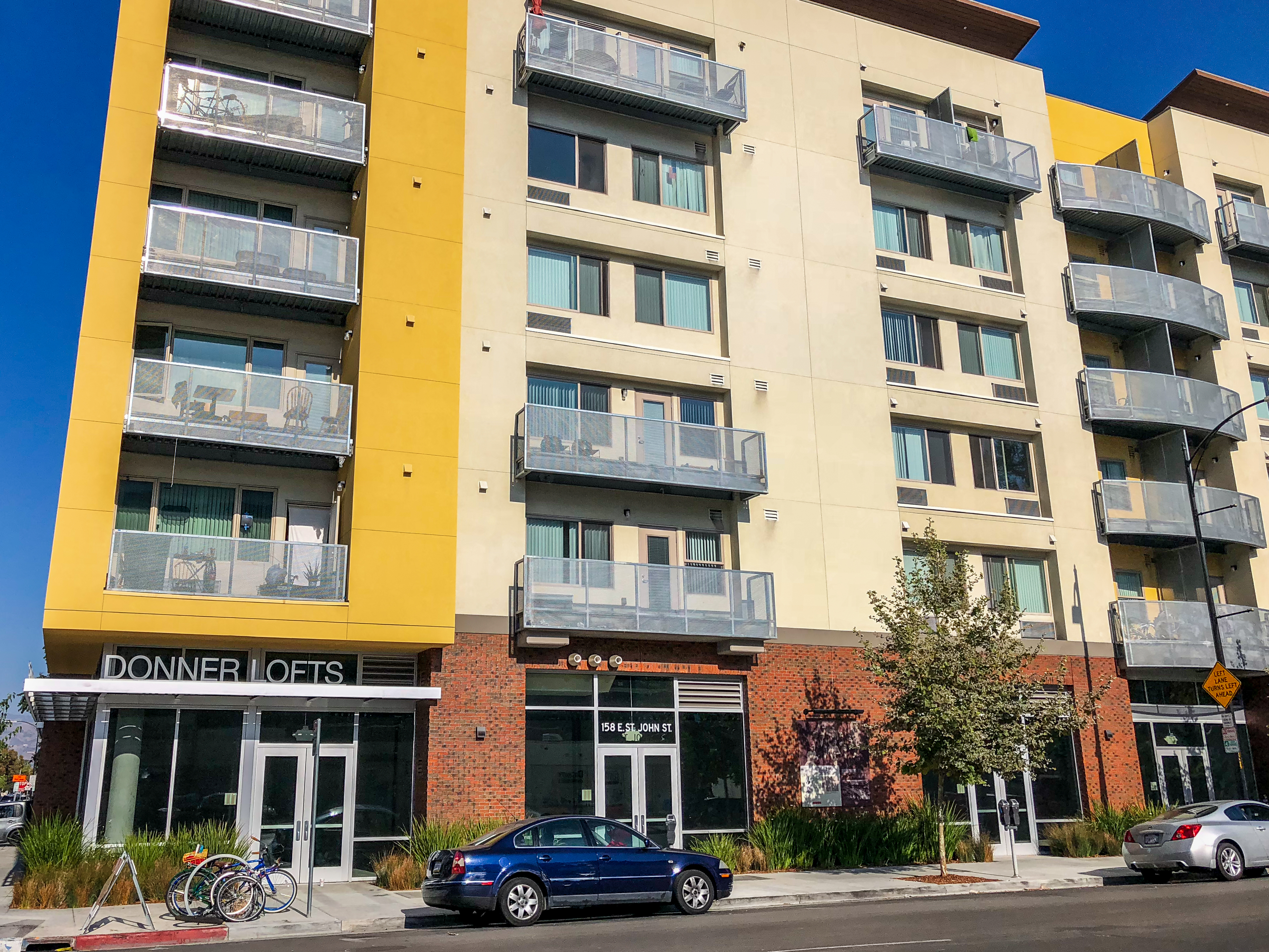
Multi-story apartment building designated for affordable housing in downtown San Jose.

=== California housing shortage ===
California housing costs are among the most unaffordable in the United States. In 2018, the median San Jose home cost 10 times the median household income; Los Angeles homes cost 9.5 times; San Francisco homes cost 8.9 times; San Diego homes cost 8.1 times. California is the most expensive state to rent in, in the United States.

California has had a housing shortage since 1970 and ranks 49th among 50 states for housing units per capita. The problem has worsened following the Great Recession as housing development fell to 40,000 units in 2009 and has not reached pre-recession levels. California needs approximately 180,000 units per year to match current growth. Slow housing development combined with high housing demand has increased housing costs in every city in California.

The state's high rent prices have translated into increased homelessness, more households spending half their income on housing, and an exodus of low and middle income households leaving to states with lower cost of living. The housing shortage negatively impacts the California economy.

Multiple state (and, in some cases, local) laws have been enacted since 1980 to reduce the shortage, with a greater number of reforms being passed since 2017: some reduced the fees and bureaucracy involved in creating ADUs, lot splits and duplexes, while others have added fees to real-estate document recording to finance low-income housing; others incentivized localities to allow higher density development closer to target locations or prevented certain practices by local governments which stifled densification.

When running for governor in 2017, Newsom announced his target of constructing 3.5 million homes statewide by 2025. This would require a quadrupling of the current rate of building to almost 400,000 units per year, a rate the state has not experienced since 1954. By 2023, only about 650,000 permits were taken out for new homes since Newsom had taken office. He revised his 2026 target downward to 2.5 million homes when running for re-election in 2022.

=== Transit-oriented development ===
In 2008, Arnold Schwarzenegger signed Senate Bill 375, which encourages transit-oriented development to reduce vehicle miles travelled in the state and to address climate change. The bill was created to help achieve the greenhouse gas reduction goals of the 2006 bill Assembly Bill 32.

Existing state law grants the authority for local zoning from the police power in Article XI, Section 7 of the California Constitution, giving cities and counties local discretion in controlling land use. Localities have exercised these zoning powers in residential areas in various ways; while land in California cities has been historically limited to low density housing (by being zoned for single-family homes and since 2016, single-family homes and up to a 1,200 square foot secondary unit), city and county governments can allow higher density zoning, if they choose. For example, in 2018, the LA County Metro Board of Directors created the Transit Oriented Communities (TOC) program after the passage of Measure JJJ in November 2016, which allows for land zoned for commercial development near transit stations to be developed into residential housing, with between 11 and 27 percent of units required to be reserved for affordable housing.

== Legislative history ==
=== Summary ===
Legislature	Summary	Short title	Bill number	Date introduced	Sponsor(s) and co-author(s)	Status
2017–2018 session	An act to add Chapter 4.35 (commencing with Section 65918.5) to Division 1 of Title 7 of the Government Code, relating to land use.	Planning and zoning: transit-rich housing bonus.	Senate Bill 827	January 03, 2018	Sen. Scott Wiener, Ben Hueso; Assem. Phil Ting	Defeated in Senate Transportation and Housing Committee April 21, 2018 (6–4)
2019–2020 session	An act to amend Section 65589.5 of, to add Sections 65913.5 and 65913.6 to, and to add Chapter 4.35 (commencing with Section 65918.50) to Division 1 of Title 7 of, the Government Code, relating to housing.	Planning and zoning: housing development: streamlined approval: incentives. ("More HOMES (Housing, Opportunity, Mobility, Equity, Stability) Act")	Senate Bill 50	December 3, 2018	Sens. Scott Wiener, Anna Caballero, Ben Hueso, Mike McGuire, John Moorlach, Nancy Skinner, Richard Roth; Assem. Kansen Chu, Tyler Diep, Vince Fong, Ash Kalra, Kevin Kiley, Evan Low, Kevin McCarty, Sharon Quirk-Silva, Robert Rivas, Phil Ting, and Buffy Wicks	Defeated on Senate floor January 31, 2020 (18–15–6)
2019–2020 session	An act to add Section 65913.3 to the Government Code, relating to land use.	Planning and zoning: housing development: density.	Senate Bill 902	January 30, 2020	Sen. Scott Wiener; Assem. Toni Atkins	Passed by the Senate floor June 22, 2020 (33–3–4); died in Assembly Appropriations Committee
2025–2026 session	An act to add Chapter 4.1.5 (commencing with Section 65912.155) to Division 1 of Title 7 of the Government Code, relating to land use.	Housing development: transit-oriented development. ("Abundant & Affordable Homes Near Transit Act")	Senate Bill 79	January 15, 2025	Sen. Scott Wiener; Assem. Matt Haney, Alex Lee, Buffy Wicks	Passed by the Senate June 3, 2025 (21–13–6); Passed by the Assembly September 11, 2025 (43–19–18); Senate concurred with Assembly amendments September 12, 2025 (21–8–11); signed into law October 10, 2025.

=== Senate Bill 827 (2018) ===
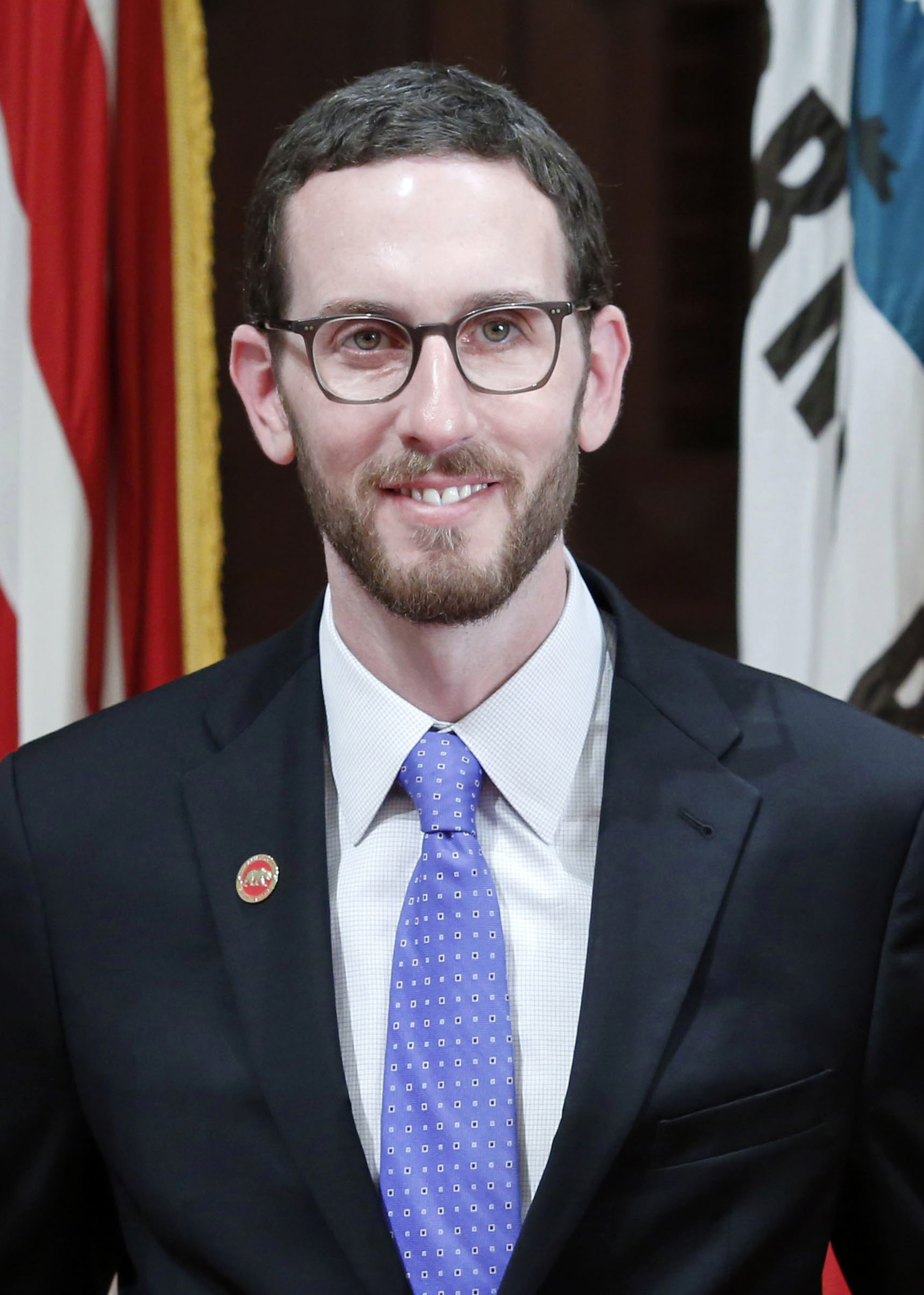
Member of the California State Senate Scott Wiener, author of SB 79.

Scott Wiener, a freshman state senator and former supervisor representing San Francisco, introduced Senate Bill 827 on the first day of the 2018 legislative session. Wiener had previously authored Senate Bill 35, a bill to streamline the approval process for residential projects, which was passed by the legislature in 2017.

Under SB 827, cities in California would have been required to permit residential buildings of up to 45 to 55 feet (14 to 17 m) in "transit rich" areas near train stations and bus stops. The bill would have also eliminated minimum requirements for parking and prohibited local design requirements that would lower the amount of space in a new development. The bill would have affected roughly 50 percent of single-family homes in Los Angeles and 96 percent of land in San Francisco.

A similar bill, Senate Bill 828, was introduced by Wiener to amend market-rate housing requirements for local governments and avoided much of the controversy that affected SB 827. Another bill, Assembly Bill 2923, was announced in March 2018 and would require the Bay Area Rapid Transit system (serving the San Francisco Bay Area) to adopt zoning standards that would be accepted by cities and local jurisdictions.

The first revisions to the bill were made in late February, adding pro-tenant provisions to prevent demolition of existing housing and other protections. In April 2018, the bill was amended to reduce the maximum height in "transit rich" areas to approximately four to five stories and remove bus stops with non-frequent service outside of peak periods. The bill was brought to the Senate Transportation and Housing Committee in April, where it was rejected by a vote of 6–4.

=== Senate Bill 50 (2019-2020) ===
==== 2019 ====
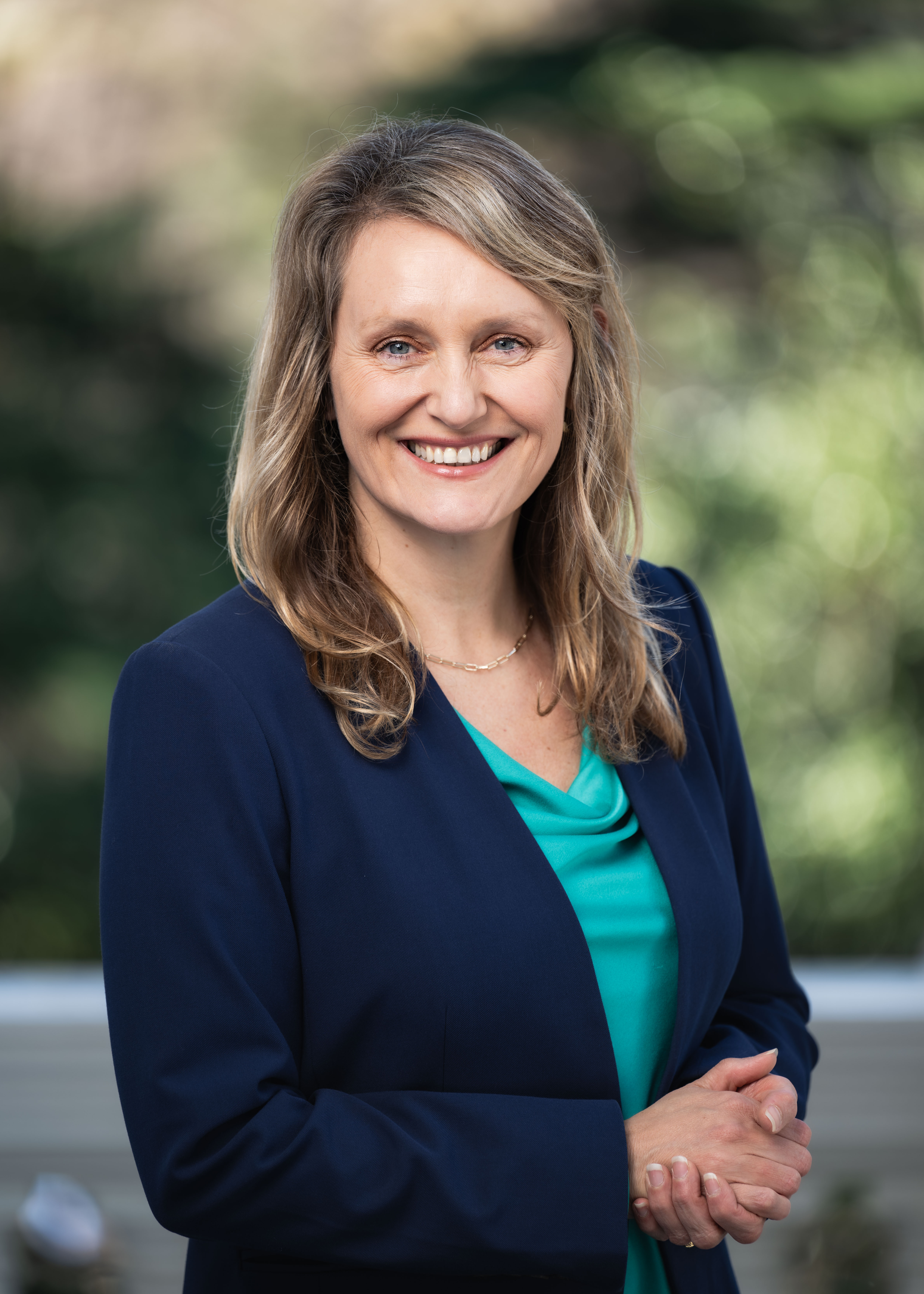
Buffy Wicks, co-sponsor of SB 79 in the Assembly.

Senator Wiener announced that he intended to introduce an updated version of the bill with a new number, 50, in the 2019 legislative session, and described the bill as the "More HOMES (Housing, Opportunity, Mobility, Equity, Stability) Act". Senate Bill 50 had the same sponsors as Senate Bill 827.

Wiener added amendments that exempted counties with populations under 600,000 from transit rezoning provisions in a compromise with Marin County senator Mike McGuire. The final bill required similar rezoning near transit, four-plex zoning statewide, and additional rezoning in "jobs-rich" areas.

In May 2019, Anthony Portantino, chair of the senate appropriations committee, made Senate Bill 50 into a two-year bill with a pocket veto, meaning it would not be eligible for consideration again until the 2020 legislative session.

==== 2020 ====
Senator Wiener reintroduced Senate Bill 50 in January 2020 with additional amendments that gave cities the ability to opt out of its rezoning provisions providing they built the state-mandated amount of housing.

Senator Portantino, who had blocked the bill in 2019, objected to not being consulted about amendments to the bill and said Wiener did not adopt suggestions from an alternative blueprint developed by a coalition of Southern California governments. Toni Atkins, president pro tempore of the senate, used parliamentary powers to maneuver the bill out of Senator Portantino's committee to prevent it from being blocked from appearing on the senate floor again.

Following debate in the senate, Senate Bill 50 was defeated on January 31, 2020, after multiple vote attempts garnered at most 18 votes, three shy of the 21 needed to pass into the state assembly. Six senators were absent or abstained from voting.

=== SB 902 (2020) ===
After the failure of SB 50, Scott Wiener proposed SB 902, a lighter-touch version of SB 50 which would allow the construction of duplexes, triplexes, and fourplexes by right. The bill would have required approval of 2 to 4 unit apartment buildings on single-family lots, depending on a city's size. The bill was passed in the Senate on June 23, 2020, but died in the Assembly Appropriations Committee.

=== SB 79 (2025) ===
In January 2025, Wiener introduced SB 79, dubbed as the Abundant and Affordable Homes Near Transit Act, which would require the upzoning of housing within distance of rail and rapid bus stations, allowing for the construction of housing between four and nine stories tall and for developers of such properties to take advantage of existing permit streamlining and density bonus laws.

==== Passage ====
State Assembly vote

State Senate concurrence vote

California State Assembly vote and State Senate concurrence vote on SB 79 by district and party.
Democratic AYE
Republican AYE
Democratic NO
Republican NO
Democratic Not Voting
Republican Not Voting

The bill was passed in both Senate committees on Housing, chaired by Aisha Wahab, and Local Government, chaired by María Elena Durazo, with one-vote majorities despite the opposition of the committee chairs. Wiener personally contacted Senate President Pro Tem Mike McGuire to allow members on both committees to vote against the recommendations of both chairs, an act known as "rolling the chair". On May 23, the bill passed the Senate Appropriations Committee by one vote, with the support of chair Anna Caballero. The Senate voted 21–13–6 in favor of the bill on June 3, 2025, sending the bill to the Assembly for consideration.

The bill, co-sponsored in the Assembly by Matt Haney, Alex Lee and Buffy Wicks, was passed by the Assembly Committee on Housing and Community Development 9–1 on July 2, 2025, and by the Assembly Committee on Local Government 6–1 on July 16, 2025. The bill was passed on August 29 by the Assembly Appropriations Committee in an 8-6-1 vote, and was passed on September 11 by the Assembly in a 43-19-18 vote. Significant amendments to the bill were made in the Assembly to reduce opposition from labor activists, tenant organizations and municipal governments. In both houses, both support and opposition crossed party lines, with opposition or abstention emanating most from legislators representing districts in Southern California.

The State Senate then concurred with the amended bill on September 12, the final day of session, in a 21-8-11 vote, with Senators Wahab and Durazo having switched their initial opposition to support following amendments providing protections for tenants, while Laura Richardson switched her initial support to opposition. The bill was sent to Newsom for his signature.

Unlike his public support and early signature for AB 130 and SB 131, Newsom did not previously indicate whether he would sign SB 79 or other housing bills passed by the Legislature. His participation in an October 3, 2025 Fortnite livestream on Twitch led to moderators of the livestream chat filtering comments supporting or opposing SB 79. In response to a question regarding the bill during the livestream, Newsom stated "It's on my desk & I will be reviewing it on its merits. It's really important housing legislation, and I recognize how important it is."

Newsom signed SB 79 into law on October 10, 2025, along with over 40 other housing bills signed that day, with his signing statement rejecting claims that the bill would impair the ability of residents to rebuild or repair homes impacted by the January 2025 Southern California wildfires.

===== Senate vote =====
District	Name	Party	Vote on bill	Vote on concurrence
1	Megan Dahle	Republican	✓ Aye	✓ Aye
2	Mike McGuire	Democratic	✓ Aye	✓ Aye
3	Christopher Cabaldon	Democratic	✓ Aye	✓ Aye
4	Marie Alvarado-Gil	Republican	✗ No	NVR
5	Jerry McNerney	Democratic	✓ Aye	✓ Aye
6	Roger Niello	Republican	✗ No	✗ No
7	Jesse Arreguín	Democratic	✓ Aye	✓ Aye
8	Angelique Ashby	Democratic	✓ Aye	✓ Aye
9	Tim Grayson	Democratic	✓ Aye	✓ Aye
10	Aisha Wahab	Democratic	✗ No	✓ Aye
11	Scott Wiener	Democratic	✓ Aye	✓ Aye
12	Shannon Grove	Republican	✓ Aye	✓ Aye
13	Josh Becker	Democratic	✓ Aye	NVR
14	Anna Caballero	Democratic	✓ Aye	✓ Aye
15	Dave Cortese	Democratic	NVR	✓ Aye
16	Melissa Hurtado	Democratic	✓ Aye	✓ Aye
17	John Laird	Democratic	✓ Aye	✓ Aye
18	Steve Padilla	Democratic	✓ Aye	✓ Aye
19	Rosilicie Ochoa Bogh	Republican	✓ Aye	✓ Aye
20	Caroline Menjivar	Democratic	✗ No	NVR
21	Monique Limón	Democratic	NVR	NVR
22	Susan Rubio	Democratic	NVR	NVR
23	Suzette Martinez Valladares	Republican	✗ No	✗ No
24	Benjamin Allen	Democratic	NVR	NVR
25	Sasha Renée Pérez	Democratic	✓ Aye	✓ Aye
26	María Elena Durazo	Democratic	✗ No	✓ Aye
27	Henry Stern	Democratic	✗ No	✗ No
28	Lola Smallwood-Cuevas	Democratic	NVR	NVR
29	Eloise Gómez Reyes	Democratic	NVR	✓ Aye
30	Bob Archuleta	Democratic	✗ No	NVR
31	Sabrina Cervantes	Democratic	✓ Aye	✓ Aye
32	Kelly Seyarto	Republican	✗ No	✗ No
33	Lena Gonzalez	Democratic	✓ Aye	NVR
34	Tom Umberg	Democratic	✓ Aye	✓ Aye
35	Laura Richardson	Democratic	✓ Aye	✗ No
36	Tony Strickland	Republican	✗ No	✗ No
37	Steven Choi	Republican	✗ No	NVR
38	Catherine Blakespear	Democratic	✗ No	✗ No
39	Akilah Weber	Democratic	✓ Aye	NVR
40	Brian Jones	Republican	✗ No	✗ No

===== Assembly vote =====
District	Member	Party	Vote on bill
1	Heather Hadwick	Republican	✓ Aye
2	Chris Rogers	Democratic	✓ Aye
3	James Gallagher	Republican	✓ Aye
4	Cecilia Aguiar-Curry	Democratic	NVR
5	Joe Patterson	Republican	✓ Aye
6	Maggy Krell	Democratic	✓ Aye
7	Josh Hoover	Republican	✓ Aye
8	David Tangipa	Republican	✓ Aye
9	Heath Flora	Republican	✓ Aye
10	Stephanie Nguyen	Democratic	✓ Aye
11	Lori Wilson	Democratic	✓ Aye
12	Damon Connolly	Democratic	✗ No
13	Rhodesia Ransom	Democratic	✓ Aye
14	Buffy Wicks	Democratic	✓ Aye
15	Anamarie Avila Farias	Democratic	✓ Aye
16	Rebecca Bauer-Kahan	Democratic	NVR
17	Matt Haney	Democratic	✓ Aye
18	Mia Bonta	Democratic	✓ Aye
19	Catherine Stefani	Democratic	✓ Aye
20	Liz Ortega	Democratic	NVR
21	Diane Papan	Democratic	NVR
22	Juan Alanis	Republican	✓ Aye
23	Marc Berman	Democratic	✓ Aye
24	Alex Lee	Democratic	✓ Aye
25	Ash Kalra	Democratic	✓ Aye
26	Patrick Ahrens	Democratic	✓ Aye
27	Esmeralda Soria	Democratic	✓ Aye
28	Gail Pellerin	Democratic	NVR
29	Robert Rivas	Democratic	✓ Aye
30	Dawn Addis	Democratic	NVR
31	Joaquin Arambula	Democratic	✓ Aye
32	Stan Ellis	Republican	✗ No
33	Alexandra Macedo	Republican	✗ No
34	Tom Lackey	Republican	NVR
35	Jasmeet Bains	Democratic	✓ Aye
36	Jeff Gonzalez	Republican	NVR
37	Gregg Hart	Democratic	✗ No
38	Steve Bennett	Democratic	✓ Aye
39	Juan Carrillo	Democratic	✓ Aye
40	Pilar Schiavo	Democratic	NVR
41	John Harabedian	Democratic	✓ Aye
42	Jacqui Irwin	Democratic	✗ No
43	Celeste Rodriguez	Democratic	NVR
44	Nick Schultz	Democratic	NVR
45	James Ramos	Democratic	✓ Aye
46	Jesse Gabriel	Democratic	NVR
47	Greg Wallis	Republican	✗ No
48	Blanca Rubio	Democratic	NVR
49	Mike Fong	Democratic	✓ Aye
50	Robert Garcia	Democratic	✓ Aye
51	Rick Zbur	Democratic	✗ No
52	Jessica Caloza	Democratic	✓ Aye
53	Michelle Rodriguez	Democratic	NVR
54	Mark Gonzalez	Democratic	✓ Aye
55	Isaac Bryan	Democratic	NVR
56	Lisa Calderon	Democratic	NVR
57	Sade Elhawary	Democratic	✓ Aye
58	Leticia Castillo	Republican	✗ No
59	Phillip Chen	Republican	✓ Aye
60	Corey Jackson	Democratic	✓ Aye
61	Tina McKinnor	Democratic	NVR
62	Jose Solache	Democratic	✗ No
63	Natasha Johnson	Republican	✗ No
64	Blanca Pacheco	Democratic	NVR
65	Mike Gipson	Democratic	NVR
66	Al Muratsuchi	Democratic	✗ No
67	Sharon Quirk-Silva	Democratic	✓ Aye
68	Avelino Valencia	Democratic	✓ Aye
69	Josh Lowenthal	Democratic	✓ Aye
70	Tri Ta	Republican	✗ No
71	Kate Sanchez	Republican	✗ No
72	Diane Dixon	Republican	✗ No
73	Cottie Petrie-Norris	Democratic	✗ No
74	Laurie Davies	Republican	✗ No
75	Carl DeMaio	Republican	✗ No
76	Darshana Patel	Democratic	✓ Aye
77	Tasha Boerner	Democratic	✗ No
78	Chris Ward	Democratic	✓ Aye
79	LaShae Sharp-Collins	Democratic	✓ Aye
80	David Alvarez	Democratic	✓ Aye

== Provisions ==
=== Approval process ===
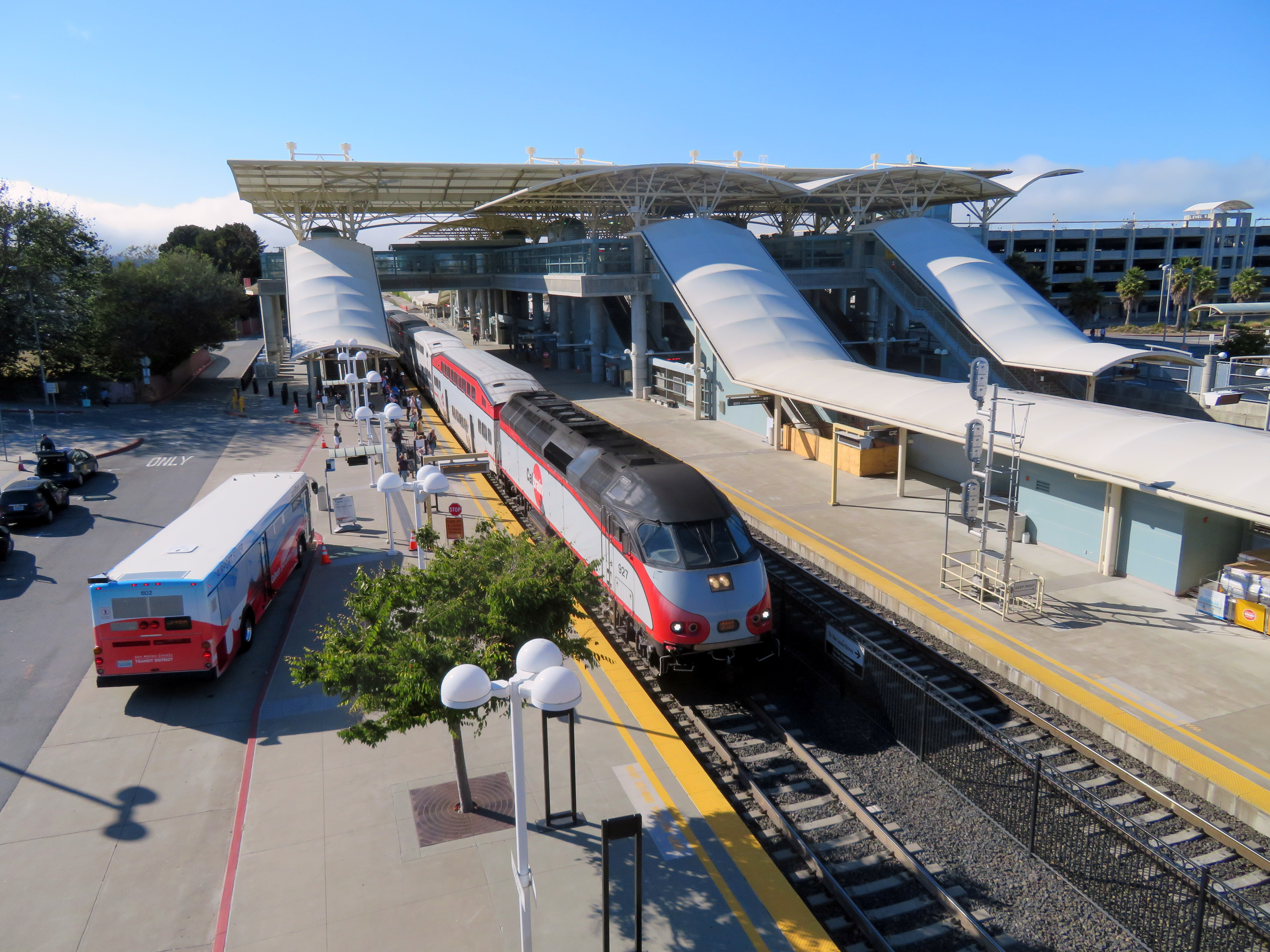
Millbrae station (BART and Caltrain intermodal station, photo taken July 2018), an example of a "Tier 1" station near which SB 79-eligible housing could potentially be built.

While not mandating ministerial approval of housing projects by itself, SB 79 allows eligibility for SB 35 (2017)/SB 423 (2023)-compliant ministerial streamlining for affordable housing projects. It adopts SB 423's requirement to hire skilled and trained workers for any SB 79 project which is higher than 85 feet (26 m) in height. In addition, SB 79 projects constructed on transit agency-owned land have the option to either hire unionized workers or enter into a direct contract with labor unions. The law excludes hotel development projects from its provisions.

The law can also be paired with the California Density Bonus Law, the California Housing Crisis Act of 2019 (SB 330), and the California Housing Accountability Act to further streamline approval. The law does not create a CEQA-exempt or by-right pathway for qualifying projects. An SB 79 project, whether residential or mixed-use, may also be built in a commercial or light-industrial zone under SB 35/SB 423 (or the project must separately qualify under SB 6).

=== Areas and tiers of applicability ===
Map of counties of California which are deemed urban transit counties under California Senate Bill 79 (2025).

The law applies only to jurisdictions within designated "urban transit counties" (UTC) which contain 16 or more rail stations, currently Alameda, Los Angeles, Orange, Sacramento, Santa Clara, San Diego, San Francisco, San Mateo. Initially inclusive of 15 or more rail stations, the threshold was raised by amendment to 16 rail stations to exclude Contra Costa, Sonoma and Marin counties, which were initially included, based on arguments by local officials that the bill would increase density along fire evacuation zones and put residents at risk. In addition, within urban transit counties, SB 79 is applied in full to projects within cities of 35,000 in population, while SB 79 projects within cities of less than 35,000 in population shall only be built within 1/4 mile (0.40 km) of an eligible station.

The law creates two tiers of jurisdictions, with SB 79-eligible housing being eligible for certain height limits depending on distance of the nearby type of transit station:

- Tier 1 jurisdictions (heavy rail OR 72+ trains daily, including BART, LA Metro B/D Lines, Caltrain): 9 stories within 200 feet (61 m) of the station, 7 stories within 1/4 mile (0.40 km) , 6 stories between 1/4 and 1/2 mile (0.40 and 0.80 km);
- Tier 2 (light rail OR 48+ trains daily OR dedicated bus lanes, including Muni Metro, LA Metro A/C/E/K Lines, VTA Light Rail, Orange Line BRT, MTS Trolley): 8 stories within 200 feet (61 m) of the station, 6 stories within 1/4 mile (0.40 km) , 5 stories between1/4 and 1/2 mile (0.40 and 0.80 km).

TOD Stop Tier	Transit Quality	Distance to a TOD Stop	Max Stories	Max Height	Max Density (du/ac)	Max Residential FAR
Tier 1	heavy rail OR 72+ trains daily (including BART, LA Metro B/D Lines, Caltrain)	200 feet (61 m)	9	95 feet (29 m)	160	4.5
Tier 1	heavy rail OR 72+ trains daily (including BART, LA Metro B/D Lines, Caltrain)	One-quarter mile (0.40 km)	7	75 feet (23 m)	120	3.5
Tier 1	heavy rail OR 72+ trains daily (including BART, LA Metro B/D Lines, Caltrain)	One-quarter to one-half mile (0.40 to 0.80 km) in a city with a population of at least 35,000	6	65 feet (20 m)	100	3.0
Tier 2	light rail OR 48+ trains daily OR dedicated bus lanes (including Muni Metro, LA Metro A/C/E/K Lines, VTA Light Rail, Orange Line BRT, MTS Trolley)	200 feet (61 m)	8	85 feet (26 m)	140	4.0
Tier 2	light rail OR 48+ trains daily OR dedicated bus lanes (including Muni Metro, LA Metro A/C/E/K Lines, VTA Light Rail, Orange Line BRT, MTS Trolley)	One-quarter mile (0.40 km)	6	65 feet (20 m)	100	3.0
Tier 2	light rail OR 48+ trains daily OR dedicated bus lanes (including Muni Metro, LA Metro A/C/E/K Lines, VTA Light Rail, Orange Line BRT, MTS Trolley)	One-quarter to one-half mile (0.40 to 0.80 km) in a city with a population of at least 35,000	5	55 feet (17 m)	80	2.5

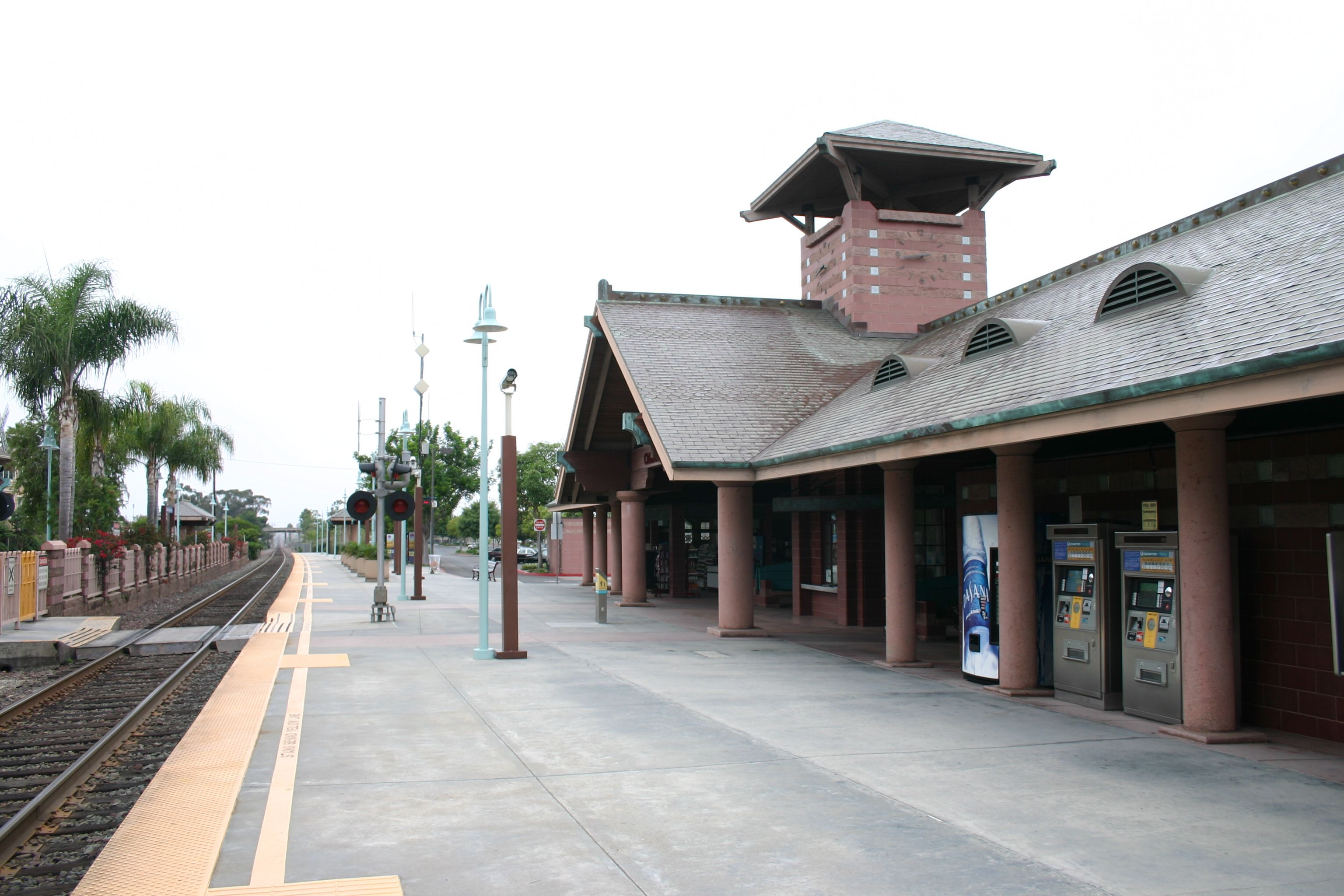
Carlsbad Village station (on the NCTD COASTER, photo taken October 2010), an example of a "Tier 3" station which would have been potentially eligible to build SB 79 housing nearby prior to removal of the Tier in committee.

Two other proposed tiers were removed in committee by amendment in early September 2025:

- Tier 3, within urban transit counties, which would have covered 24+ trains daily or ferry (i.e., COASTER, Metrolink (mostly), SF/Oakland ferries, Capitol Corridor) and would have allowed for lower height limits (up to 7 stories within 200 feet (61 m) of the station, 5 stories within 1/4 mile (0.40 km) , 4 stories between 1/4 and 1/2 mile (0.40 and 0.80 km));
- Tier 4, which would have applied outside of urban transit counties within distance of any rail service (heavy, light, commuter with 24+ trains daily) or ferry (7 stories within 200 feet (61 m) of the station, 5 stories within 1/4 mile (0.40 km) , or locally authorized limit between 1/4 and 1/2 mile (0.40 and 0.80 km)).

Density bonuses are applied to the distance of a project adjacent to a station:

- within 200 feet (61 m) of the station: 4-4.5 FAR, 120-160 units/ac, 85–95 feet (26–29 m);
- within 1/4 mile (0.40 km) of the station: 3-3.5 FAR 100-120 units/ac, 65–75 feet (20–23 m);
- within 1/2 mile (0.80 km) of the station: 2.5-3 FAR, 60-100 units/ac, 55–65 feet (17–20 m).

Under AB 2097 (2022), parking mandates are prohibited statewide within 0.5 miles (0.80 km) of a major transit stop for most development projects, including SB 79-eligible projects in urban transit counties.

=== Tenant and disaster protections ===
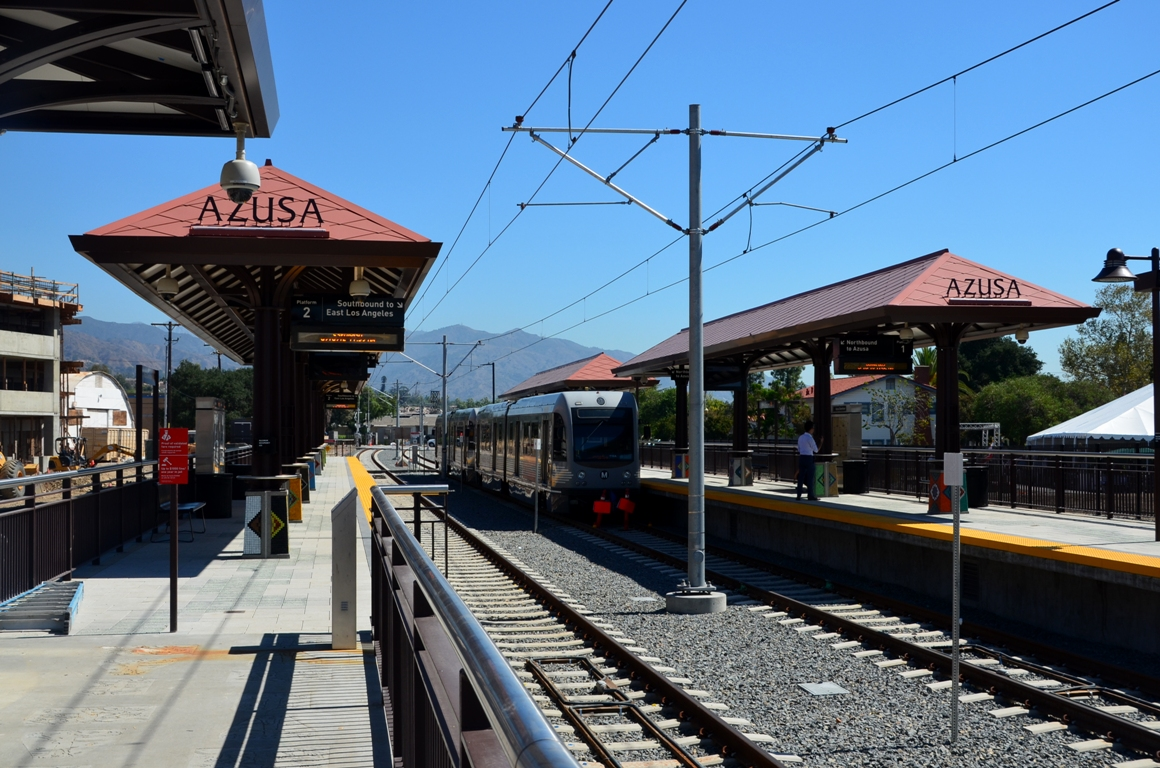
Azusa Downtown station (on the A Line of the Los Angeles Metro Rail system, photo taken September 2015), an example of a "Tier 2" station near which SB 79-eligible housing could potentially be built.

For renters, SB 79 prevents demolishing rent-controlled buildings where renters have lived any time in the seven years prior to passage of the bill. Any demolitions of rent-controlled housing in favor of SB 79-eligible housing would require a minimum amount of assistance by the developer to existing tenants, including:

- moving costs plus three months' worth of rent;
- Right to return at a rent affordable to the tenant;
- Subsidized rent while the new homes are being built;
- guarantee that new housing units exceed the quality of demolished housing.

Cities are allowed to provide further tenant protections beyond those outlined in SB 79. In addition, every SB 79-eligible development must designate 7% of units for extremely low income residents (30% of area income (AMI) and 93% at market rate), 10% for very low income (50% of AMI and 90% market rate), and 13% for low income (60% of AMI and 87% market rate). However, SB 79 cannot be used on a site containing more than two units if either the development would require the demolition of any units which are rent- or prince-controlled and has been occupied by tenants within the last five years or the site previously involved more than two rent-controlled units which were demolished within five years prior to submission of an SB 79 streamlining permit.

The law excludes:

- sites with a "very high fire severity zone", as defined by CAL FIRE, or within the state responsibility area;
- sites vulnerable to one foot of sea level rise;
- sites which are designated on a local historic register, so long as such sites do not exceed 10 percent of any transit-oriented development zone.

The law incorporate "fire flexibility", allowing local leaders a minimum of 3 years to adopt plans that ensure maximum community protection from wildfires and shift density away from highly fire-prone areas.

=== Effective date and enforcement ===
The law came into effect in local agencies on July 1, 2026 (unless a local agency adopted an HCD-compliant implementing ordinance or local transit-oriented development alternative plan (TODAP) prior to the effective date), while implementation of SB 79 in unincorporated areas of a county has been delayed until the 7th Regional Housing Needs Assessment allocation cycle in 2031. In addition, implementation of SB 79 in station areas which have at least 50% of SB 79 eligibility in 6th Cycle rezoning, as well as in various sensitive areas (historic districts, low resource areas and fire- or sea level rise-prone areas), would be delayed until one year following adoption of the 7th Cycle, provided that the local agency has adopted an ordinance indicating the site's exclusion. Compliance by local governments is monitored by the California Department of Housing and Community Development (HCD), which preclears TODAPs prior to implementation.

Within urban transit counties, SB 79 will apply in full to any station which is fully planned or under construction by January 1, 2026, including to Orange County upon completion of the OC Streetcar, slated for Q1 2027. SB 79 will only apply partially to any county which fully plans a minimum 16th rail station and achieves urban transit county status after January 1, 2026, with only heavy rail, light rail, and eligible commuter rail stations being covered to the exclusion of BRT stations.

The HCD shall be responsible for enforcement of compliance, and is empowered to suspend any non-compliant local implementing ordinance. The HCD may refer any local government found in violation of SB 79 to the Attorney General of California for prosecution. The Attorney General may also levy a fine of $10,000-$50,000 per month upon the offending local government until the HCD finds the local government in compliance.

== Political debate ==
=== Senate Bill 827 ===
Wiener said he proposed Senate Bill 827 in part to alleviate the state's ongoing housing affordability crisis as well as to address carbon emissions generated by vehicles. Regarding the issue of local control, he stated: "In education and healthcare, the state sets basic standards, and local control exists within those standards. Only in housing has the state abdicated its role. But housing is a statewide issue, and the approach of pure local control has driven us into the ditch."

The bill was opposed by city councils in Los Angeles, San Francisco, and major suburban cities, by suburban homeowners, and by tenants' rights groups, who argued that additional development would cause gentrification and displace underprivileged residents, especially non-white groups.

The bill was supported by a group of scholars who stated that it would help reduce decades of racial and economic residential segregation, by national pro-housing groups, and by over 100 executives from the Bay Area technology industry, who voiced their support for the bill in a joint letter.

The Sierra Club California opposed the bill, saying that denser housing near major transit lines would displace people from cities and undermine plans for future commuter rail projects.

=== Senate Bill 50 ===
Senate Bill 50 received coverage from major national newspapers outside of California, with the New York Times and The Atlantic publishing articles and opinion pieces on the bill.

Some scholars questioned the ability of Senate Bill 50 to lower housing prices on its own, with some giving credence to the idea that it was a "luxury housing bill." Senator Wiener said "increasing the supply of market rate housing, over time, will reduce costs."

A study published in Urban Affairs Review found five years after Chicago rezoned land around transit stops for denser market-rate development, speculation caused housing prices to increase in the rezoned areas while housing production did not increase. The author of the study, in an online essay, said the tenant protections in Senate Bill 50 made it different from Chicago's rezoning. The author also acknowledged the need for affordable housing development to address California's housing issues and how more research was necessary to determine the long-term effects of rezoning on housing prices and production.

The mayor of Beverly Hills, who engaged in a broadcast debate with Senator Wiener, questioned why Senate Bill 50 would necessarily impact Southern California while exempting several affluent yet sparsely populated Bay Area counties. The bill faced opposition from local governments around the state who objected to how the bill would usurp local land use authority. Some mayors endorsed the bill.

Senator Wiener said the passage of an anti rent-gouging bill in the previous year hindered the leverage for passing Senate Bill 50.

A Los Angeles Times columnist said lawmakers from the greater Los Angeles area delegation were responsible for the demise of Senate Bill 50, and that the fight "had nothing to do with partisan politics" but instead was "all about geography" while a Curbed columnist said opposition from a statewide coalition of affordable housing advocacy organizations was responsible for the defeat of Senate Bill 50.

Independent analyses said most of the development spurred by the bill would have likely happened in the San Francisco Bay area.

Michael Storper has argued that slight reductions in stringent zoning would mainly produce housing for wealthy people, and that it is already legal under existing zoning to build millions of units in unprofitable locations.

=== Senate Bill 79 ===
Los Angeles City Council districts vote on SB 79 opposition resolution. AYE (Park, Lee, Hutt, Jurado, McOsker, Padilla, Rodriguez, and Yaroslavsky) NO (Raman, Soto-Martinez, Harris-Dawson, Price and Hernandez) ABSENT (Nazarian and Blumenfield)

The bill was publicly endorsed by the California Democratic Party's Executive Board (in a 111–62 vote), Oakland mayor Barbara Lee, former U.S. Representative Katie Porter, the San Francisco Chronicle, and the city councils of Culver City, Emeryville, Santa Monica, West Hollywood and San Diego.

SB 79 received the formal opposition of 132 city councils by resolution, including Los Angeles Mayor Karen Bass and the Los Angeles City Council in an 8–5 vote, although the vote composition changed from the council's previous unanimous opposition to SB 50 in 2019. Commentators noted that, within Los Angeles' city limits, support for SB 79 (and opposition to the city council's resolution) was most concentrated among city councilmembers and state legislators representing Central, South, and Eastside regions of the city, which are mostly zoned for multi-family housing and which have polled most in favor of increased construction of multi-family housing. Despite the LA Council's vote against SB 79, Wiener credited the five dissenting councilmembers (Nithya Raman, Hugo Soto-Martinez, council president Marqueece Harris-Dawson, Curren Price and Eunisses Hernandez) for helping secure the Assembly's passage of the bill.

The bill was significantly amended in Assembly committees in order to win legislative and organizational support. Wiener and other supporters negotiated with the State Building and Construction Trades Council to secure the council's withdrawal of opposition to the bill, and secured support for the bill from UNITE HERE, in return for labor-friendly amendments. Amendments in favor of tenants and affordable housing protections secured the withdrawal of opposition to SB 79 by the Strategic Actions for a Just Economy, California Rural Legal Assistance and other organizations.

Following passage of the bill, Bass called for Newsom to veto the bill.

== Implementation and impact ==
Within UTCs, SB 79 is set to overturn or undermine local laws and propositions which restrict density and height levels for multi-family housing, such as Proposition U, a 1986 Los Angeles ballot initiative which limited allowable residential density outside of Downtown Los Angeles by half. The law's immediate impact was not expected by commentators to blunt the effects of contemporary economic deterrence to housing construction (i.e. Tariffs in the second Trump administration), but to potentially take advantage of future market improvements favorable to construction in order to bring down the costs of housing and living. The law, if used for the construction of SB 79 projects, is slated to increase regular usage of public transit, as well as reduce emissions, traffic congestion and accidents from automobiles.

One preliminary analysis by Streets for All estimated that SB 79 would zone nearly 1.5 million new units of housing in the City of Los Angeles, enough to double the city's then-current housing stock of 1.37 million homes, with over 448,000 new units being zoned after the law's effective date of July 1, 2026, and over 1 million more units during the 7th RHNA Cycle in 2031. In addition, the analysis estimated that the law would impact 17,929 acres, or a little over 5% of city land, with over half of impacted acres previously zoned for single family homes (9,953 acres).

=== Reaction after passage ===
==== Los Angeles ====
On January 22, 2026, the Board of the Los Angeles Metro, including Bass, voted to urge the state government to exempt Los Angeles County entirely from enforcement of SB 79 in proposed cleanup legislation, with only county supervisors Janice Hahn and Lindsey Horvath voting against the resolution. The Board formally stated its reasoning that implementation of denser housing near transit stations could "harm the transit agency's expansion goals by galvanizing housing opponents against new light rail stations and dedicated bus lanes."

In response to several large-city mayors requesting him for funding for homelessness services, Newsom criticized several city governments for not complying with SB 79 and other state densification laws, threatening to withhold funding for 15 cities, including Los Angeles, for their noncompliance.

In March 2026, the Los Angeles City Council voted for the Low-Rise Ordinance, a bill to overhaul a portion of its zoning map in order to delay full implementation of SB 79. The overhaul allowed multiplex buildings as tall as three or four stories in 57 higher-income neighborhoods currently restricted to single family homes (within the larger area of three-quarters of city land reserved for single-family homes), in exchange for temporarily exempting zoning changes in poorer neighborhoods, known fire zones and historic districts. The ordinance delays full implementation of SB 79 in Los Angeles until after 2030. The Low-Rise Ordinance was passed in second reading on June 3 and was passed unanimously in third reading on June 23, with Bass receiving the bill for signature or veto.

==== San Francisco ====
The San Francisco Family Zoning Plan (FZP) was drafted to create capacity for 36,000 new units, particularly in the neighborhoods on the west and north sides of the city, fulfilling the state's mandate for the city to build 82,062 additional housing units for different income levels by 2031 while maintaining some autonomy over housing policy, including allowing the city to bypass the mandatory height and density minimums imposed by SB 79. The plan, which was introduced to the Board of Supervisors by Mayor Daniel Lurie on June 24, 2025, received the support of the Planning Commission and the Land Use and Transportation Committee. It was passed by the Board of Supervisors 7-4 on December 2, 2025 and was signed into law by Lurie on December 12, 2025. The plan took effect on January 12, 2026 ahead of the state-mandated deadline of January 31.

The FZP faced opposition from both supporters and opponents of SB 79. In February 2026, YIMBY Law, the California Housing Defense Fund and Californians for Homeownership filed a lawsuit against the city for exempting several critical areas of the city from coverage in violation of SB 79, as well as prohibiting applicants from utilizing several state laws, including the State Density Bonus, SB 9, and AB 2011. Opponents filed a lawsuit in January 2026, arguing that the FZP would displace residents and was passed without an adequate review under CEQA.

==== San Diego ====
As of July 1, 2026, 24% of the eligible area in San Diego was upzoned, with the rest of eligible areas delayed from implementation due to prior designation by the city for fire risk, low resource neighborhoods, and sea level rise. While no area in San Diego would apply for Tier 1 upzoning, a draft map was released by the San Diego Association of Governments (SANDAG) on July 3 showed 47 trolley and bus rapid transit stops where SB 79 would apply. An additional 17 more stops were added by SANDAG over objections by the city government over their eligibility under SB 79.

An ordinance authorizing phased implementation of SB 79 was approved by San Diego City Council on May 7, 2026. Additionally, a Transit Village Plan, set for release by the San Diego Planning Department in spring of 2027, would shift certain amounts of density from one SB 79-eligible area to another under a TODAP.

==== Los Angeles County ====
- Beverly Hills: In January 2026, the City Council adopted a TODAP and submitted it to HCD, with HCD approving the TODAP on June 9.
- Culver City: Council voted to adopt a local implementation which permits more housing than required under SB 79.
- Pasadena: On June 9, the City Council voted in first reading to delay implementation for 18 months in sites with locally designated historic resources in all six transit zones until consideration of a TODAP.
- West Hollywood: The Southern California Association of Governments (SCAG) released a map of eligible transit stops for implementation, which excluded three planned stops on the K Line within West Hollywood city limits. Vice Mayor Danny Hang cited the exclusion as a reason to not pursue a TODAP. The HCD subsequently compelled SCAG to list the three planned K Line stops, stating that the methodology for the exclusion was in error.

==== Santa Clara County ====
- Palo Alto: the council rejected an urgency ordinance, but passed two temporary ordinances to exempt historic sites and cap developments at 50% of the density and height otherwise stated in the law through 2032, allowing the law to take full effect in all eligible zones for two weeks from July 1 to July 16, when the temporary ordinances took effect. By July 16, the city received nine applications to build up to 400 multi-family units as SB 79-eligible projects near the city's three Caltrain stations in the northern half of the city. The first received its first application under the temporary ordinances on July 28.
- San Jose: the council pursued a policy to exempt a large industrial area from SB 79.

==== San Diego County ====
- San Marcos: On June 15, the Planning Commission recommended that the City Council adopt a proposed ordinance to implement SB 79 while also exempting sites in very high fire hazard severity zones and those that cannot be accessed via a direct pedestrian walking path.

==== San Mateo County ====
- Atherton: On March 18, the City Council adopted zoning amendments to implement SB 79, which were approved by the HCD on June 10. The city received its first SB 79 application on August 4, 2026.
- Burlingame: the City Council was criticized by YIMBY advocates for its TODAP.
- Menlo Park: Council voted to adopt SB 79 in full, rejecting a recommendation from the planning commission to seek an exemption.
- San Mateo: the city received its first SB 79 application on August 1, 2026.

== Related legislation ==
=== Streamlined permitting ===
SB 79 can be paired with several laws to speed approval by local governments:

- Under the California Density Bonus Law and amendments, SB 79 projects are eligible for density bonuses, incentives or concessions, waivers or reductions of development standards, and modified parking ratios. However, local governments are not required to grant additional height increases beyond those allowed under SB 79.
- Under the California Housing Crisis Act of 2019 (SB 330) and amendments, developers who submit a "preliminary application" and pay a processing fee to a local agency for a SB 79-eligible housing development project can "freeze" the applicable fees and development standards applicable to the project while assembling the material necessary for a full application.
- Under the California Housing Accountability Act and amendments, SB 79 projects may utilize the Builder's remedy process to ameliorate violations of the law by local governments.
- Under California Senate Bill 35 (2017) and amendments, SB 79-eligible projects which qualify are eligible for streamlined approval within 60 days (if less than 150 units of housing) or 90 days (if 150 or more) and exemption from California Environmental Quality Act review, including within certain areas of the coastal zone (as defined by the Coastal Act and the California Coastal Commission).
- Under the Affordable Housing and High Road Jobs Act (AB 2011) and amendments, SB 79 projects which qualify are eligible for CEQA-exempt, ministerial, by-right approval for affordable housing on commercially zoned lands, and also allowing such approvals for mixed-income housing along commercial corridors, provided that such housing projects satisfy specific criteria of affordability, labor, and environment and pay prevailing wage.
- Under the Middle-Class Housing Act of 2022 (SB 6) and amendments, SB 79 projects which meet SB 6 criteria (either a 100-percent residential project or a mixed-use project where at least 50 percent of the square footage is dedicated to residential uses) may invoke portions of SB 35 and the Housing Accountability Act. SB 6 projects, unlike AB 2011 projects, are not CEQA-exempt but need not provide any affordable housing.
- Under the Surplus Land Act, SB 79 projects with designated units for affordable housing may receive prioritization for local public agencies (cities, counties, districts, and housing authorities) when selling or leasing surplus public land.
- Under AB 2097 and related legislation, SB 79 projects are not required by local governments to build a minimum of parking spaces within a TOD unless a "substantial hardship exception" is filed by a local government to impose a mandate to meet its RHNA obligations for low and very low income residents, disabled and elderly residents.
- Under the Affordable Housing on Faith and Higher Education Lands Act (SB 4) and amendments, faith-based institutions and non-profit colleges are allowed ministerial, "by-right" approval of SB 79-eligible projects on land which they own and are exempt from some types of CEQA review, provided that the projects comply with all objective building standards and existing environmental regulations and comply with SB 4 labor standards.

=== ADU construction ===
In 2016, California lawmakers removed local barriers to accessory dwelling unit (ADU) construction by passing Senate Bill 1069. This was later updated in 2017 with Senate Bill 229 and Assembly Bill 494. These bills modified single-family zoning throughout California by requiring speedy local approval of up to 1,200 square foot secondary units on all residential property in California, including land zoned for single-family homes. In 2019, the law was updated with Assembly Bill 68 to allow up to 500 square feet (46 m^{2}) of the 1,200 square feet (110 m^{2}) to be designated a "junior accessory dwelling unit"; some commentators said this amounted to de facto triplex zoning throughout the state.

=== HOME Act ===
In 2021, SB 9, the California HOME Act, which was co-sponsored by Wiener, was signed into law, legalizing up to two units to be constructed across the state. Under the law, ADUs and JADUs can be built on a HOME Act project provided that the total number of dwellings does not exceed the amount allowed under the HOME Act.

=== Parking mandates ===
On August 30, 2022, AB 2097 was passed by the legislature, and was signed into law on September 22, 2022 by Newsom. It removes parking minimums for homes and commercial properties within 1/2 mile (0.80 km) of public transit stations or in neighborhoods with low rates of car use. California became the second state after Oregon to eliminate parking minimums near public transit. Other laws passed before and after AB 2097, including the HOME Act, SB 4, and SB 6, also prohibited parking mandates within one-half mile (0.80 km) of public transit for eligible projects.

=== Commercially-zoned areas ===
AB 2011 allows for the density of mixed income projects to be 80 units per acre for sites within one-half mile (0.80 km) of a major transit stop (regardless of whether another previous condition applies), and (through subsequent amendments by AB 2243 in 2024) also allows for the maximum height for an AB 2011 project to be 65 feet (20 m) for sites that are within one-half mile (0.80 km) of a major transit stop and not within a coastal zone, with the ability to increase the height limit for affordable housing through the density bonus.

=== Major transit stops ===
On September 19, 2024, Newsom signed into law AB 2553, which expanded both the definition of "major transit stop" under the California Environmental Quality Act to service frequency of 20 minutes or less, as well as eligibility for reduced traffic impact fees under the Mitigation Fee Act from "transit station" to "major transit stop".

=== Downtown Revitalization Act ===
The Downtown Revitalization Act (AB 2074) requires "transit-rich cities" (cities with a population of at least 400,000 containing at least two qualifying transit-oriented development stops, currently applying to Los Angeles, San Diego, San Jose, San Francisco, Sacramento, Oakland and Long Beach) to designate at least one regional transit hub district within each downtown area, that each regional transit hub district allow for construction of "downtown housing development" projects meeting certain requirements (150-foot height baseline, requiring at least 25% of the designated transit district to allow 450 feet or more) and eligible for streamlined ministerial approval, and requiring CalHFA to conduct a housing construction loan and financing study. AB 2074 was signed into law September 29, 2026.

=== HCD reform ===
In 2025, as part of the reorganization of the BCSH within the budget, Governor Newsom proposed spinning off the HCD, along with the California Interagency Council on Homelessness, California Housing Finance Agency and the Civil Rights Department, into a separate cabinet-level superagency, the California Housing and Homelessness Agency (CHHA), as well as the creation of a Housing Development and Finance Committee (HDFC) within the new agency to streamline policies on affordable multifamily housing funds, partly due to the growth of enforcement powers attributed to the HCD since 2017. Following approval by the Little Hoover Commission and de facto approval by the Legislature, the change took effect on July 1, 2026.
