= Not Yet New York =

Political organization

Not Yet New York was a Los Angeles, California political organization in the 1980s. Its goals were to slow the growth of the city, and preserve open space and low density. Founded by Laura Lake, a UCLA professor, and Barbara Blinderman, an attorney, it played a major part in the passage of Los Angeles's Proposition U. It is now mostly disbanded.
