= San Francisco Bay Area Renters' Federation =

Political advocacy group in San Francisco Bay Area, California

The San Francisco Bay Area Renters' Federation (SFBARF) is a political advocacy group formed in response to the present-day San Francisco housing shortage. SFBARF advocates for more housing development, and fewer zoning restrictions on the production of housing. It is one of several formed YIMBY (Yes In My Back Yard) groups in the San Francisco Bay Area.

== History, organization, and membership ==
SFBARF is an unincorporated club. The organization's acronym barf, a slang term for vomiting, was deliberately chosen to improve the group's name recognition.

SFBARF engages in anti-"NIMBY" political activity, such as rallying for housing projects, campaigning for legislation, and organizing events. The press has referred to SFBARF as an "avidly pro-development grass-roots activist group" aiming to increase the height and density of buildings allowed under San Francisco Bay Area zoning regulations. The New York Times says of the group:

"Its platform is simple: Members want San Francisco and its suburbs to build more of every kind of housing. More subsidized affordable housing, more market-rate rentals, more high-end condominiums."

The group was founded in early 2014 by local activist Sonja Trauss, a self-described anarchist. Previously a prep school math teacher, Trauss now leads the group full-time.

As of April 2016, the group had a mailing list of 500 people and a "a few dozen hard-core members — most of them young professionals who work in the technology industry — who speak out at government meetings and protest against the protesters who fight new development."

== Funding ==
Opponents have accused the organization of being funded by the real estate industry. SFBARF has denied this claim, saying they have raised no money from real estate developers. Yelp CEO Jeremy Stoppelman has donated $10,000 to the group.

== Campaign to take over SF Sierra Club ==
In 2015, SFBARF campaigned to take over the leadership for the San Francisco chapter of the Sierra Club, claiming that the local chapter opposed high-density development, such as 2015's Proposition D in Mission Bay. According to the San Francisco Business Times, SFBARF "believes that blocking dense housing near transit encourages sprawl," which is environmentally destructive. The national Sierra Club strongly supports infill development. The campaign was criticized in an editorial in VICE, which said that one of the candidates SFBARF supported, Donald Dewsnup, had a history of using "shady" activism tactics. Dewsnup was later convicted of voter fraud.

== Litigation ==
The group has invoked California's Housing Accountability Act in order to sue cities when they attempt to block, restrict, or downsize housing development.

Their first suit was in 2015, when SFBARF sued the city of Lafayette, California for blocking a housing development. The group referred to this as part of their "Sue the Suburbs" campaign, creating a website under this name. The suit claimed that under California's Housing Accountability Act, the Lafayette city council could not force developers to reduce the density of a housing project, since the project already complied with all zoning laws. In a televised debate with SFBARF, Lafayette mayor Brandt Andersson argued the suit was unwarranted, saying that Lafayette should "keep multi-unit housing downtown" near the BART station.

=== SFBARF v. City of Berkeley 2017 ===
In April 2015, a developer submitted an application to tear down a dilapidated building at 1310 Haskell Street in Berkeley, and replace it with three two-story homes. In July 2016, the Berkeley City Council voted 5-0 (with 4 abstentions) to deny the proposal. The city was sued by the SF Bay Area Renters Federation, who argued that denying the application violated California's Housing Accountability Act (HAA). In October 2016, the city settled the lawsuit by agreeing to reconsider the proposal.

In July 2017, the judge ruled in favor of SFBARF. In September 2017, the Berkeley City Council voted to approve the project and settle the lawsuit.

== See also ==
- San Francisco housing shortage
- California housing shortage
