= YIMBY Law =

Pro-housing group in California, United States

- Tax ID no.: 32-0610451
- Headquarters: San Francisco, California
- Executive Director: Sonja Trauss
- Affiliations: Yes In My Back Yard
- Website: https://www.yimbylaw.org

YIMBY Law is a pro-housing group that sues municipalities in California over alleged non-compliance with state housing laws. It is the legal arm within the charitable affiliate of the YIMBY Action political group.

In 2022, YIMBY Law was more active than the state attorney general in enforcing SB 9, which allowed duplexes and lot-splitting in many California neighborhoods statewide. In 2025, the group released a report that found that five state housing laws (including SB 9, AB 2011, and SB 4) intended to boost construction had had "limited to no impact on the state’s housing supply". The group blamed legal loopholes, additional requirements, and obstruction by local governments for making the new construction financially infeasible.

YIMBY Law's first lawsuit was filed against Simi Valley in 2019 for denying an elder care facility on the grounds that it did not qualify as housing under California law. A judge ruled against the city in 2021. In 2023, YIMBY Law, Californians for Homeownership, and California Housing Defense Fund sued 12 municipalities and counties in the Bay Area—Belvedere, Burlingame, Cupertino, Daly City, Fairfax, Martinez, Novato, Palo Alto, Pinole, Pleasant Hill, Richmond and Santa Clara County—for allegedly failing to file a legally compliant housing development plan as required by state law. If the lawsuits succeeded, the affected jurisdictions would have to approve all developments meeting certain criteria (builder's remedy). The organization also sued Redondo Beach and Sausalito on similar grounds. In 2024, the organization settled its lawsuit with Cupertino, which agreed to allow "builder's remedy" developments. It also sued Los Angeles for a second time over failure to allow affordable housing in formerly single-family areas; a judge ruled against the city in 2025. In 2025, the organization also threatened to sue Fairfax, California, Menlo Park and Palo Alto over housing developments. In 2025, YIMBY Law sued Cupertino again over rejected housing proposals; the state found against the city later that year. In 2026, YIMBY Law sued Sausalito, and San Francisco for allegedly non compliant housing development plans. In August 2026, YIMBY Law threatened to sue Grover Beach if a multifamily development wasn't approved. They also sued San Francisco over a city ordinance that purported to exempt parts of SoMa, the Bayview, and the Bayshore from SB 79.

Following the January 2025 Southern California wildfires, YIMBY Law sued several municipalities in Los Angeles County over executive orders by California governor Gavin Newsom and Los Angeles mayor Karen Bass allowing municipalities to disallow SB 9 in affected areas with high wildfire danger. YIMBY Law argued that the pro-housing law allowed residents more flexibility in recovering from the fires. YIMBY Law settled the lawsuit from Malibu and Pasadena in July 2026, but lawsuits continue against the governor, mayor, Los Angeles County, and the city of Los Angeles.

In 2026, YIMBY Law's president, Sonja Trauss, was investigated by the state bar association over legal threats but cleared of the charges.
