= Rent Relief Act =

2018 proposed U.S. federal bill

Kamala Harris discussing the Rent Relief Act.

The Rent Relief Act was a U.S. federal bill proposed by Kamala Harris in 2018 that would offer tax credits to renters who earn less than $100,000 and spend over 30 percent of their income on rent and utilities.

Kamala Harris stated that the bill would "[bolster] the economic security of working families."

The bill was criticized for its proposal that would create rental subsidies, but fail to address the underlying cause of the high housing prices. The Tax Foundation found that the proposed program would benefit landlords more than renters and lead to market distortion.

Experts have stated that in housing supply-constrained states like California, this proposal would increase rents as landlords would increase their prices to absorb the additional money tenants would now have available for rent payments.
