= Plan Bay Area =

Plan Bay Area is the long-range Regional Transportation Plan and Sustainable Communities Strategy for the nine-county San Francisco Bay Area. It is the Bay Area's implementation of the Sustainable Communities and Climate Protection Act of 2008, or SB 375, a California law that aims to integrate sustainable strategies to reduce transportation-related pollution and external greenhouse gas emissions. The plan identifies goals and develops strategies for transportation, land-use, and housing to accommodate the region's expected growth and needs over a long-term planning horizon. It is jointly prepared by the Metropolitan Transportation Commission (MTC) and the Association of Bay Area Governments (ABAG).

The goal of this plan is to improve on earlier efforts of network and growth within the context of finance and environmental responsibility. Like all plans, it is a work in progress that is updated every four years to reflect on new priorities and changes with the goal of reducing greenhouse gas emissions.

The initial plan was approved on July 18, 2013, by the Association of Bay Area Governments and by the Metropolitan Transportation Commission. Plan Bay Area 2040, which includes projections and strategies through the year 2040, was adopted in July 2017. It was replaced by Plan Bay Area 2050 in 2021, extending projections and strategies through 2050. The current plan is Plan Bay Area 2050+, which was adopted in March 2026 as an update to Plan Bay Area 2050. MTC and ABAG are currently working on Plan Bay Area 2060, which is expected to be adopted in Spring 2030.

== Employment ==
The Bay Area has a high concentration of knowledge-based industries, research centers, and universities. It includes Silicon Valley, one of the world’s best-known technology clusters. The region’s range of industries has attracted a highly educated and international labor force.Faroutmagazine

The Bay Area attracts highly skilled and educated individuals around the world as it is the global epicenter for advancements in technology and related knowledge-based industries. Despite this growing population and the increase access of job opportunities, there is limited housing options available.

== Housing Crisis ==
Due to the continual growth of companies moving into the Bay Area, there is a high demand of employment. However, there is a low supply of housing available to accommodate these workers.

=== Job-Housing Connection Approach ===
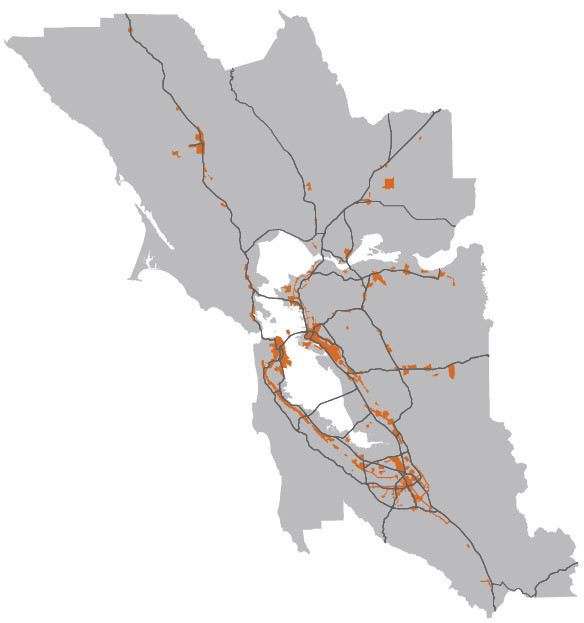
Priority Development Areas around the Bay Area

The Job-Housing Strategy consists of addressing housing, economic development, transportation, and land conservation policies in order to support long-term growth. This strategy focuses on locally designated Priority Development Areas to attract economic potential by providing housing and increasing transportation options for the growing demand of workers. This strategy consists of four goals:

1. To create more jobs in order to stimulate and strengthen the regional economy.
2. Widen the accessibility, affordability, and variety of housing available.
3. Establish a network of communities.
4. Protect region's unique natural environment.

The hope of these goals is to strengthen regional infrastructure and preserve agriculture land and natural resources.

== Long-term Goals ==
The final blueprint for directing all growth in the Bay Area is to reduce urban sprawl onto natural and agricultural land. Some of the highlights include the following:

- No sprawl for 30 years. New growth will occur within existing boundaries by increasing population density.
- Public transit will be located near 80% of new homes, as well as the projected 60% of new jobs.
- Funds provided by the One Bay Area Grant program will go to locations that are the most sustainable and equitable developed for transportation and affordable homes.
- Natural and agricultural land will be protected and funded by the Priority Conservation Area Grant Program.
