= Sonja Trauss =

American activist

Sonja Trauss (born 1980 or 1981) is an American activist known for YIMBY and advocating for more housing. Born in Philadelphia, Trauss founded the San Francisco Bay Area Renters' Federation in 2014. She ran for San Francisco District 6 Supervisor in 2018, losing to Matt Haney. She currently leads YIMBY Law, a legal advocacy and education nonprofit for more housing.

== Early life and career ==
Sonja Trauss was born in 1980 or 1981. She grew up in Germantown, Philadelphia. Her father, Irwin Trauss, was a housing lawyer who represented homeowners facing foreclosure. She graduated from Temple University with a degree in philosophy after advocating for skateboarders in Love Park. She started a PhD in Economics at Washington University in St. Louis and left early with a master's degree. Trauss moved to El Cerrito, California to care for a relative, and then moved to West Oakland, working at times in a bakery and then as a math teacher.

== Housing advocacy ==
=== Bay Area Renters Federation ===
In 2013 or 2014, upset by housing costs, Trauss began writing letters going to government hearings in support of housing projects. She signed her letters as the Bay Area Renters' Federation (SF BARF). Trauss gained attention at public hearings and on Twitter for provocative statements. SF BARF's mailing list grew to a few hundred and dozens began to attend public hearings to support housing. She received financial support from Jeremy Stoppelman. In 2015, Trauss raised enough funds to advocate full-time.

In 2015, SF BARF launched a campaign to change the leadership of the local chapter of the Sierra Club, arguing that the chapter's opposition to development was detrimental to the mission. The campaign failed.

In 2016, Trauss was an organizer for a political action committee to elect Scott Wiener to the State Senate, beginning to formalize a group that would campaign in elections.

=== Supervisor candidacy ===
In 2017, Trauss announced she was running for San Francisco Supervisor in District 6, representing the Tenderloin, South of Market, and Mission Bay neighborhoods. In the 2018 ranked choice election, she finished third with 19% of the vote, losing to Matt Haney.

=== Legal advocacy ===
In 2015, Trauss founded California Renters Legal Advocacy Fund (CaRLA) with others to sue cities that reject housing projects and violate the Housing Accountability Act. CaRLA intervened on behalf of developers in Sausalito, Berkeley, and San Mateo—typically wealthier communities that reject new housing—and succeeded in getting project approvals. Their lawsuit in Lafayette on a set of apartments with 315 homes resulted in a settlement but no change in the project.

As of 2022, Trauss is the Executive Director of YIMBY Law, a legal nonprofit that uses laws to ensure governments follow housing laws encouraging more new housing. In 2022, YIMBY Law raised money to hold San Francisco in compliance with housing law. In 2023, YIMBY Law sued cities for missing a state-mandated deadline for updating their housing plans. In 2024, Trauss announced that YIMBY Law would be expanding outside of California.

=== Controversies ===
In 2017, after Trauss equated opposition to a housing project in the Mission District to Donald Trump's hostility to immigrants, Supervisor David Campos credited Trauss for changing his mind and supported an appeal of a housing project.

In 2018, at dueling rallies over California Senate Bill 827, Trauss moved into the opposing crowd and was escorted away by a sheriff's deputy.

in May 2020, California Fair Political Practices Commission fined San Francisco Bay Area Renters Political Action Committee, of which Strauss was principal officer and treasurer, $9,500 for three counts: failing to maintain adequate records for expenditures, commingling contributions received by the Committee with the personal funds of Trauss, and failing to disclose contributions and correct amounts for expenditures.

== Personal life ==
As of 2018, Trauss is married and has one child.

== See also ==
- YIMBY
- Scott Wiener
- London Breed

== Notes ==
=== References ===
- Dougherty, Conor (2020). Golden Gates: The Housing Crisis and a Reckoning for the American Dream. Penguin Books. ISBN 978-0-525-56023-4.
