= Affordable housing in Silicon Valley =

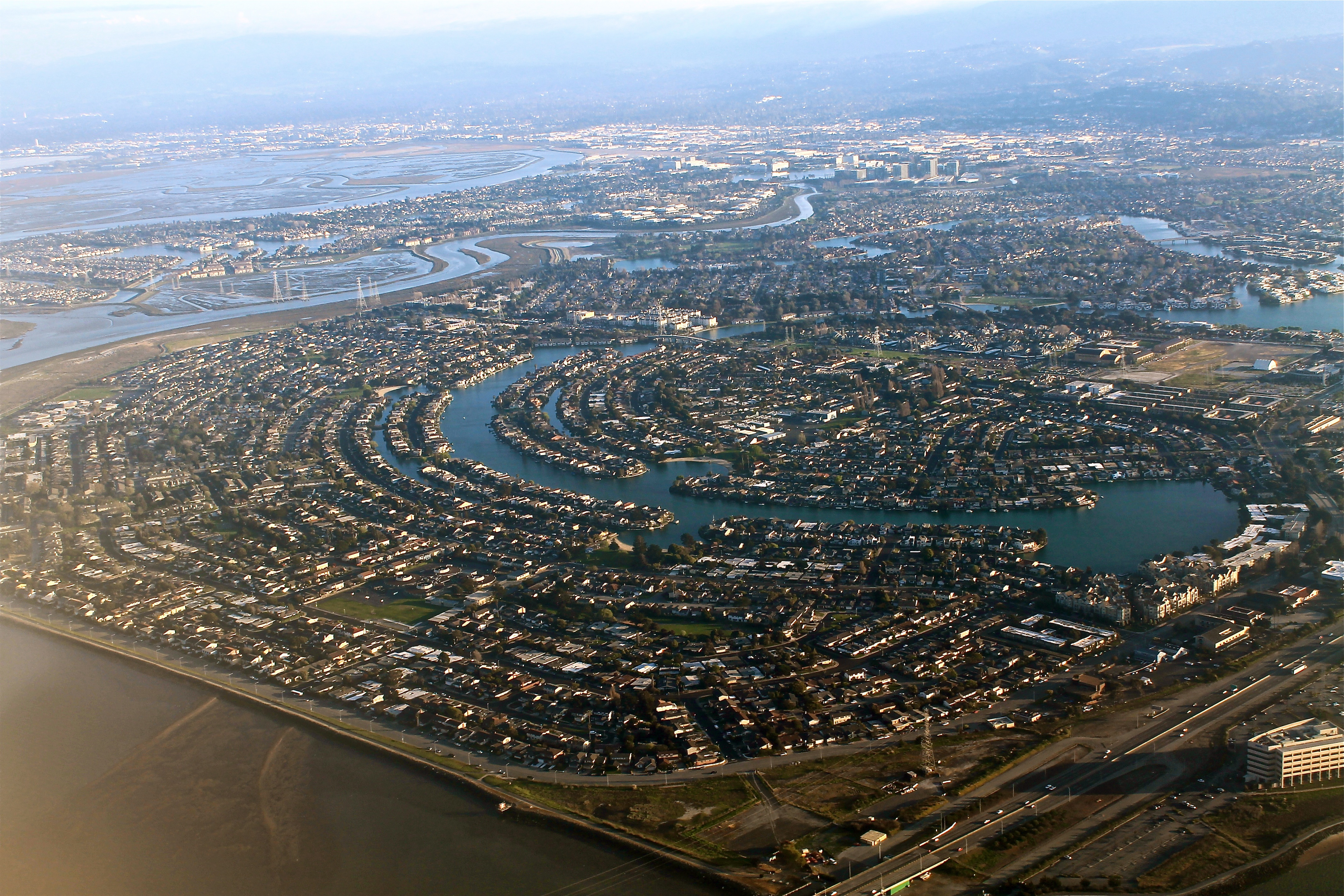
Silicon Valley

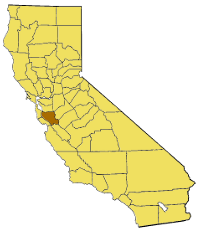
Santa Clara County is generally considered to be the center of Silicon Valley.

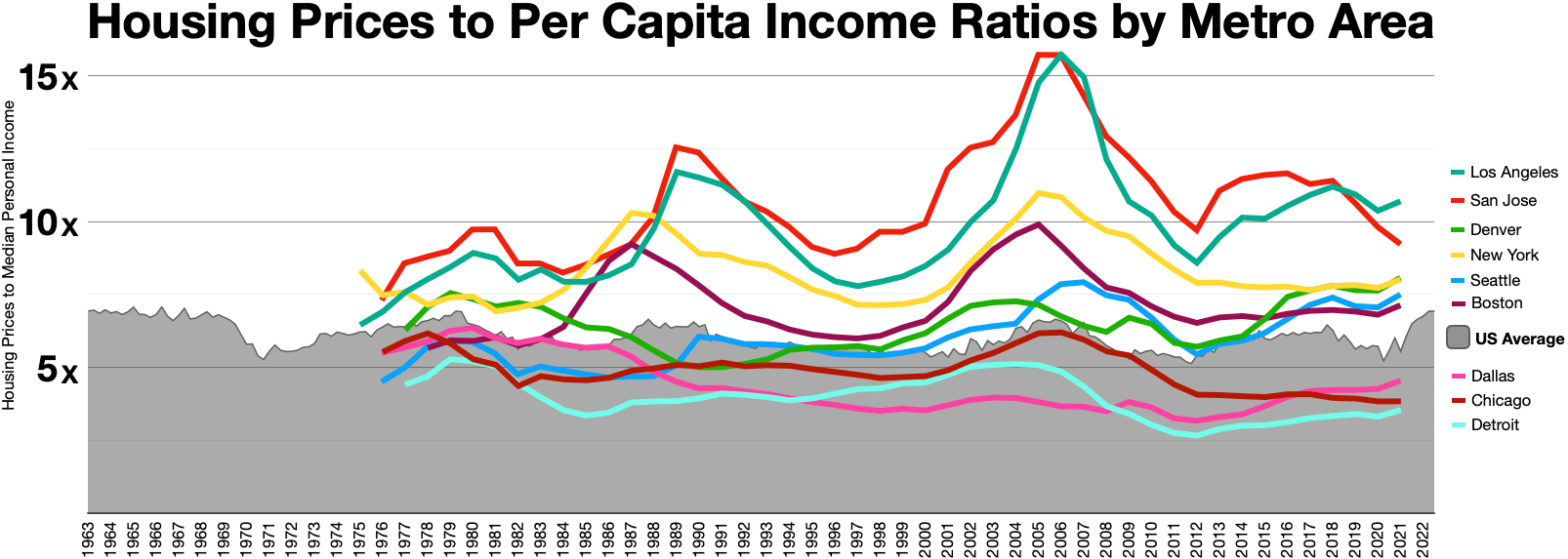
Housing prices to personal income ratios by metro area Los Angeles San Jose Denver New York Seattle Boston United States average Dallas Chicago Detroit

Silicon Valley, a region located in the southern part of the San Francisco Bay Area, is one of the most expensive regions to live in the United States, and many residents lack access to affordable housing. In 2018, the median home price across the area was $1.18 million, the highest of the 100 largest metro areas in the U.S. There have been local efforts to address affordable housing, as well as state measures in response to housing issues across California (see California housing shortage).

Silicon Valley does not have concrete boundaries, and is defined differently by different organizations. Thus, housing initiatives and data often come from specific cities, counties, or metro areas, rather than the entire region. Statistics referencing the "Silicon Valley" refer to Joint Venture Silicon Valley's 2019 Index, which includes all of Santa Clara and San Mateo counties, as well as select cities in Alameda and Santa Cruz counties.

== Cost and availability of affordable housing ==
In 2018, the median rental rate in Silicon Valley was $2,911, the highest of any major metropolitan region in the United States. At $3.20 per square foot, the San Jose metro area has the second highest rental rate per square foot in the United States, behind San Francisco at $3.42. In comparison, the median rental rate per square foot in New York was $2.67; in Las Vegas, it was $1.20. The 2018 median home price in Silicon Valley was $1.18 million, a 21% increase from 2017. Almost 90% of low income renters in the San Jose-Sunnyvale-Santa Clara metro area were cost burdened in 2017, meaning they spent more than 30% of their income on housing. Over a third of mid-income renters were cost burdened as well.

In the San Jose-Sunnyvale-Santa Clara metropolitan area, there are 30 available and affordable housing units for every 100 extremely low-income households below 30% of the area median income. There are 43 available and affordable units for every 100 low income households below 50% of the area median income. The average monthly inventory of homes for sale in Silicon Valley has seen a major decline in past years: in 2011, there were around 7,000 homes for sale each month; in 2018, there were just over 3,000.

In California, local governments work with the state government to develop a Regional Housing Need Allocation, the number of housing units that should be created in an area to meet its housing needs. Between 2015 and 2018, Silicon Valley cities permitted 85% of units needed to reach the goal for residents in the Above Moderate Income category, or residents who make above 120% of the area median income. However, for very low income, low income, and moderate income residents, there has been far less housing production; 5%, 6%, and 2% of the need has been met for those groups, respectively.

== Intersection of jobs and housing ==
A major cause of high housing costs in Silicon Valley is expansive job growth without adequate housing production. In 2018, close to 36,000 new jobs were created in the area (34% of which were tech jobs); only 8,400 new residential units were issued permits.

=== Corporate housing investments ===
Several Silicon Valley companies have taken steps to aid the area's housing shortage.

In January 2019, a group called The Partnership for the Bay's Future announced a $500 million investment in affordable housing in Silicon Valley. The project was spearheaded by the Chan Zuckerberg Initiative, founded by Facebook CEO Mark Zuckerberg and his wife Priscilla Chan. Other supporters include Morgan Stanley, Kaiser Permanente, Facebook and Genentech. The group will create an investment fund to preserve current housing and build new units, as well as a policy fund to support governments and other groups in affordable housing endeavors.

In June 2019, Google announced that it would invest $1 billion to aid the housing shortage in Silicon Valley. Their plan includes working with local government to lease company-owned land to developers, and creating a $750 million investment fund to incentivize affordable housing construction.

In October 2019, Facebook announced that they would also be investing $1 billion in California housing. The money will be used in several different ways. Facebook will partner with the California state government and spend $250 million to build mixed-income housing on state land. $150 million will support affordable housing development, particularly for the homeless, through the Partnership for the Bay's Future. Facebook will produce over 1,500 mixed-income units on $225 million of their own land in Menlo Park, and they will spend $25 million to build housing for teachers throughout Silicon Valley. The remaining $350 million will be spent depending on the success of each project.

In November 2019, Apple announced a $2.5 billion investment in California housing. Apple will create a $1 billion investment fund for affordable housing, and another $1 billion mortgage assistance fund to aid first-time homebuyers in California. They will also make $300 million worth of company-owned land available for affordable housing production, create a $150 million fund to support affordable housing specifically in the Bay Area, and donate $50 million to Destination: Home, a non-profit that addresses homelessness in Silicon Valley.

=== Since 2015 ===
Since 2015, there have been reports of a changing environment in the housing market. Job growth in Silicon Valley has been slowing since 2015, and 2018 saw the lowest rate of job growth since the Great Recession. The rate of population growth has also been decreasing since 2015, and more people are moving out of the area than moving into it. Since April 2018, the median sale price of homes in Santa Clara County has been dropping; neighboring San Mateo County has not had the same steady downward trend, but median home sale prices were lower in August 2019 than their peak in January 2018. The Mercury News reported that in March 2019, the median home sale price for all nine counties of the Bay Area dropped for the first time in seven years. Furthermore, the average monthly inventory of homes for sale in Silicon Valley increased 15% from 2017 to 2018. Real estate agents report an increasing number of middle-aged and elderly residents selling their homes and moving to more affordable locations, and although this has not made the housing market "affordable", it is causing changes.

== Zoning ==
A proposed solution to affordable housing has been to change zoning laws to allow increased density, although critics, often long-time residents, frequently oppose such measures and say they will worsen the already-bad traffic in the area.

In 2018, Palo Alto passed a number of changes to zoning laws with the goal of incentivizing housing production, both market-rate and subsidized. Since then, the city council passed the first completely affordable housing development since 2013, a 59 unit apartment complex targeting low-income residents.

== Policy recommendations ==
Public transportation is often cited as an important feature in producing affordable housing. Experts suggest investing in affordable housing as a whole, including better connecting the 27 different transit agencies in the Bay Area, as well as strategically building affordable housing close to public transportation routes. Affordable housing proponents also suggest making the permitting process easier for developers to get through, and subsidizing affordable housing construction or reducing fees.

The California Housing Partnership, a statewide nonprofit, issues housing reports for counties across the state and works with local organizations to develop county-specific recommendations. Their April 2018 report suggested that Santa Clara County set aside more units in new developments for very low- and low-income families, focus more on the homeless population, change policies that create barriers for housing developers, and look further into the development of accessory dwelling units.

== Affordable housing initiatives by city ==
=== San Jose ===
San Jose plans to build over 6,000 rental units in 2019, a 283% increase from the number of units built last year. The city has also recently passed a bill to subsidize the production of high rise buildings in the downtown area, although it is a controversial move that critics say will benefit developers but harm workers.

The city's first ever affordable housing complex for previously homeless residents, Second Street Studios, opened in August 2019.

San Jose was one of few cities in America to have rent control laws, which were adopted by the city in 1979. A statewide rent control bill was signed into law by governor Gavin Newsom in October 2019.

With the growth of Silicon Valley, the City of San Jose has been tasked by the California Department of Housing and Urban Development to build 23,775 units of low-income housing by 2031. Of those 23,775 units, 15,088 will be designated for extremely low-income and very low-income households. The remaining 8,687 units will be designated for low-income households.

In Spring of 2020, the San Jose City Council approved the McEvoy and Dupont Apartments to be built in downtown San Jose. Combined, the McEvoy and Dupont will have 365 affordable units designated for working individuals and families. Both towers will receive a LEED Platinum rating and built using mass timber, an innovative sustainability technique.

On May 18, 2023, the San Jose City Council approved a plan to issue approximately $120 million in housing revenue bonds. These bonds will be used to finance two projects: the Charles and Tamien Station. The Charles is a 97-unit apartment complex for households earning incomes of 30% to 50% of the area median income. Tamien Station will contain 134 units for households earning 30% to 60% of the area median income.

To improve the approval process for developers, the City of San Jose plans to launch a streamline permitting process to reduce the time needed to secure permitting approval. In many surrounding cities, permitting may take several years, while San Jose projects may potentially be permitted in as few as six months.

=== Sunnyvale ===
A 100% affordable housing complex known as "Block 15" is set to begin construction in downtown Sunnyvale in 2020. The 90-unit building will house low-income and extremely-low-income residents, with 23 units set aside for those with developmental disabilities.

== See also ==
- California Housing Crisis
- Affordable Housing
- Affordable Housing in the United States
