= California housing shortage =

Extended and increasing shortage since 1970

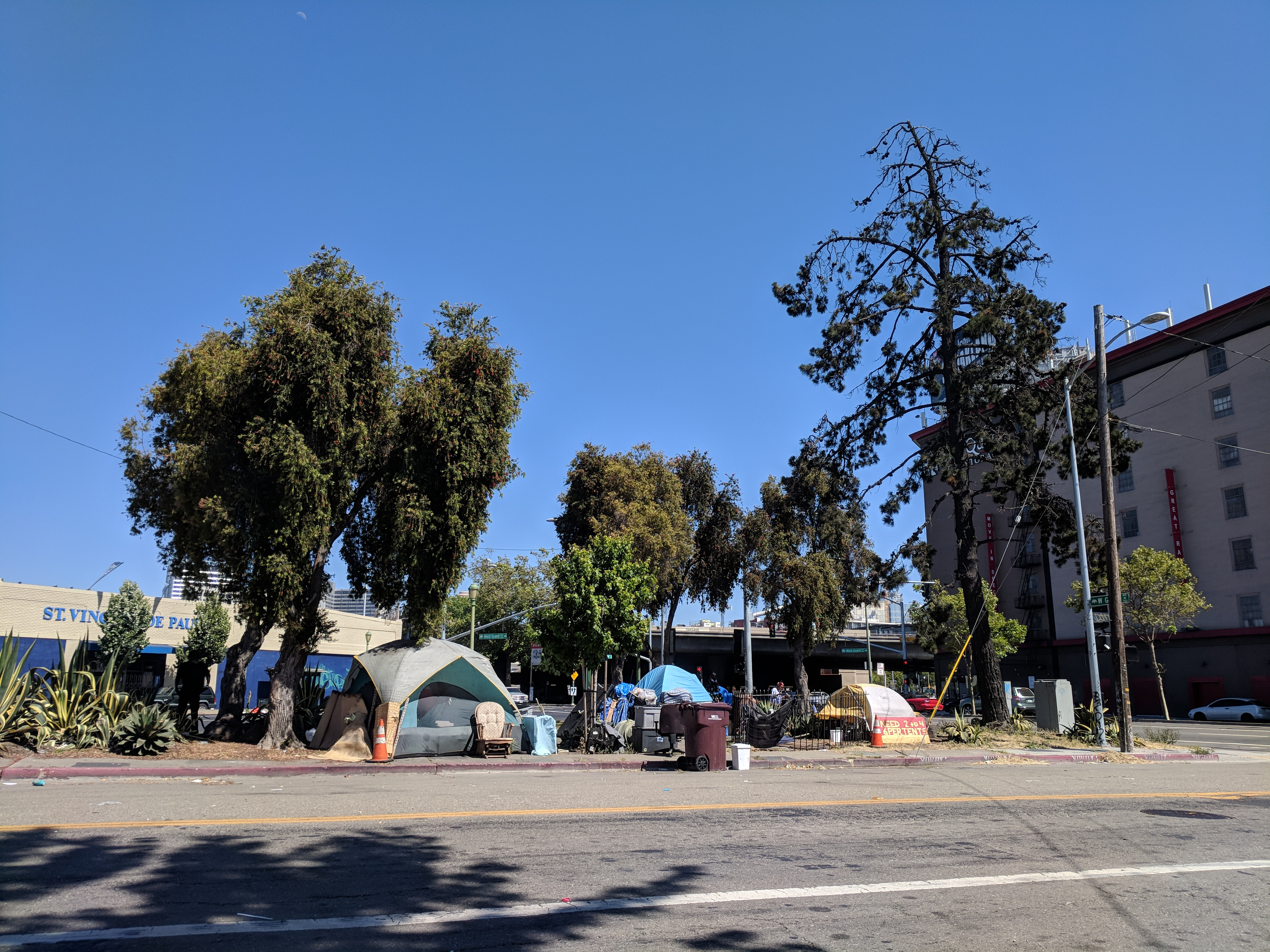
A tent city, a form of improvised housing, in Oakland, California

Since about 1970, California has been experiencing an extended and increasing housing shortage, such that by 2018, California ranked 49th among the states of the U.S. in terms of housing units per resident. This shortage has been estimated to be 3-4 million housing units (20-30% of California's housing stock, 14 million) as of 2017. In 2018, experts said that California needs to double its current rate of housing production (85,000 units per year) to keep up with expected population growth and prevent prices from further increasing, and needs to quadruple the current rate of housing production over the next seven years in order for prices and rents to decline. In 2025 the shortage was still estimated at 3 million housing units.

The imbalance between supply and demand resulted from strong economic growth creating hundreds of thousands of new jobs (which increases demand for housing) and insufficient construction of new housing to meet demand. From 2012 to 2017 statewide, for every five new residents, one new housing unit was constructed. In California's coastal urban areas, (where the majority of job growth has occurred since the Great Recession), the disparity is greater: in the Bay Area, seven times as many jobs were created as housing units. By 2017, this resulted in the median price of a California home being over 2.5 times the median U.S. price. As a result, less than a third of Californians can afford a median priced home (nationally, slightly more than half can), 6 percentage points more residents are in poverty than would be with average housing costs (20% vs. 14%), homelessness per capita is the third highest in the nation, the state's economy is suppressed by $150–400 billion annually (5-14%), and many Californians have long commutes.

Several factors have together caused constraints on the construction of new housing (see 'California studies' under Growth management): density restrictions (e.g. single-family zoning) and high land cost conspire to keep land and housing prices high; community involvement in the permitting process allows current residents who oppose new construction (often referred to as NIMBYs) to lobby their city council to deny new development; environmental laws are often abused by local residents and others to block or gain concessions from new development (making it more costly or too expensive to be profitable); and construction costs are greater because of high impact fees and required use of union labor in some projects. The discretionary and burdensome regulatory framework for housing construction in California has created a fertile environment for political corruption, as local politicians take bribes and favors to help actors navigate the regulations.

In recent years, the California legislature has passed several bills: some reduced the fees and bureaucracy involved in creating ADUs, while others have added fees to real-estate document recording to finance low-income housing; others required localities to allow higher density development close to public transit.

== Background ==
Issi Romem, an economist at the Terner Center for Housing Innovation at the University of California, Berkeley said:

"...as long as abundant new housing was built to accommodate those drawn to California, housing price growth was limited and the state's allure was channeled into population growth: From 1940 to 1970 California's population grew 242 percent faster than the national pace, while the growth of its median home value was only 16 percent faster than the nation's."

Starting in 1970, three major forces caused housing prices to increase dramatically: land use restrictions limiting housing density (zoning many areas to single-family homes, or to at most two stories), increased concern for the environment (which led to environmental laws and designating land for preservation and not development), and community involvement in the development process (which allows current—but not future—residents a say in land use decisions.)

The result of these policies was that from 1970 to 2016, California's population growth (relative to the US average) slowed to a third of what it was during the previous three decades (70 percent faster than the national pace by 2016), while appreciation of median home prices (relative to the US average) more than quadrupled to 80 percent greater than the national rate.

By 2016, the median price of a home in California, at $409,300, was more than twice the median price of a home in the U.S. as a whole, more expensive than any state other than Hawaii. The shortage is statewide; from 2010 to 2017, the state added one new housing unit for every five new residents, and is pronounced in employment centers such as the Bay Area and Los Angeles. In 2023, housing affordability in California reached a 16-year low, with only about 16% of homebuyers able to purchase a median-priced single-family home, as per data from the California Association of Realtors. In San Mateo and Santa Clara counties, buyers would require a minimum income of $504,400 and $451,200, respectively, to purchase median-priced homes of $2.01 million and $1.8 million.

The housing situation affects individuals differently, depending upon their circumstances. A person who has long since paid off a home mortgage has much lower costs than a renter or someone buying a first home. As of 2020, about 20 percent of California homeowners owned their homes free and clear, and 80 percent were still paying a mortgage. As is typical, homeowners without a mortgage tend to have lower incomes (e.g., due to retirement) than homeowners with a mortgage. California homeowners without a mortgage tend to spend almost 9% of their income on housing costs, including property taxes, which is slightly lower than the national average for homeowners without a mortgage. The Covid-19 pandemic led to people demanding more square footage, helping to keep rents and home prices high even as the state lost population and more apartments came online.

== Causes ==
The imbalance between supply and demand resulted from strong economic growth creating hundreds of thousands of new jobs (which increases demand for housing) and the insufficient construction of new housing units to provide enough supply to meet the demand. Fewer housing units built in the urban and coastal areas relative to the demand created by economic growth in those areas resulted in higher prices for housing and spillover to the inland areas. For example, from 2012 to 2017, San Francisco Bay area cities added 400,000 new jobs, but only issued 60,000 permits for new housing units. (For California as a whole, from 2011 to 2016, the state added only one new housing unit for every five new residents.) This has driven home prices and rents to high levels, such that by 2017, the median price of a home across California was more than 2.5 times the median in the U.S. as a whole, and in California's coastal urban areas, (where the majority of job growth has occurred since the Great Recession), the shortages are greater.

In 2016, the California Legislative Analyst's Office published a report that showed an inverse correlation between new housing construction and displacement in low income neighborhoods in the Bay Area. The Washington Post wrote of this, "Particularly in the Bay Area since 2000, the researchers found, low-income neighborhoods with a lot of new construction have witnessed about half the displacement of similar neighborhoods that haven't added much new housing." The same Washington Post article also stated, "Importantly, the benefits of all this building aren't about inclusionary policies, which require developers to set aside some affordable units in market-rate buildings. There's less displacement in high-construction neighborhoods whether they have inclusionary policies or not."

In February 2025, Bloomberg contrasted the situation in San Francisco with that in Austin. Bloomberg reported that rents in Austin had fallen by 22% since August 2023, after the city allowed increased density and taller buildings, made it easier to get building permits, and eliminated parking requirements. Bloomberg wrote of this, "... the Texas capital has become the poster child for advocates who say the only way out is by building more homes. And while other cities run by progressives including San Francisco and Chicago face criticism for onerous permitting processes, Austin has cut regulations to speed up development. It appears to have worked."

Several factors have together caused constraints on the construction of new housing.

=== Zoning laws ===
With origins in late nineteenth century Germany and England, modern day zoning (laws) and land use place limitations on what can be built and where, whether for the better or worse in intention, such as to keep toxic chemicals from residential areas or out of racism to promote segregation. In its relation to single family homes, zoning laws are seen to often discriminate against the concept of affordable housing in that by constructing residential housing more sparsely and less compact, the costs of living are driven up, compared to if a multi family home was built, which is often seen in cities where there is limited space, and often needed and desired by minority groups who fall to poverty.

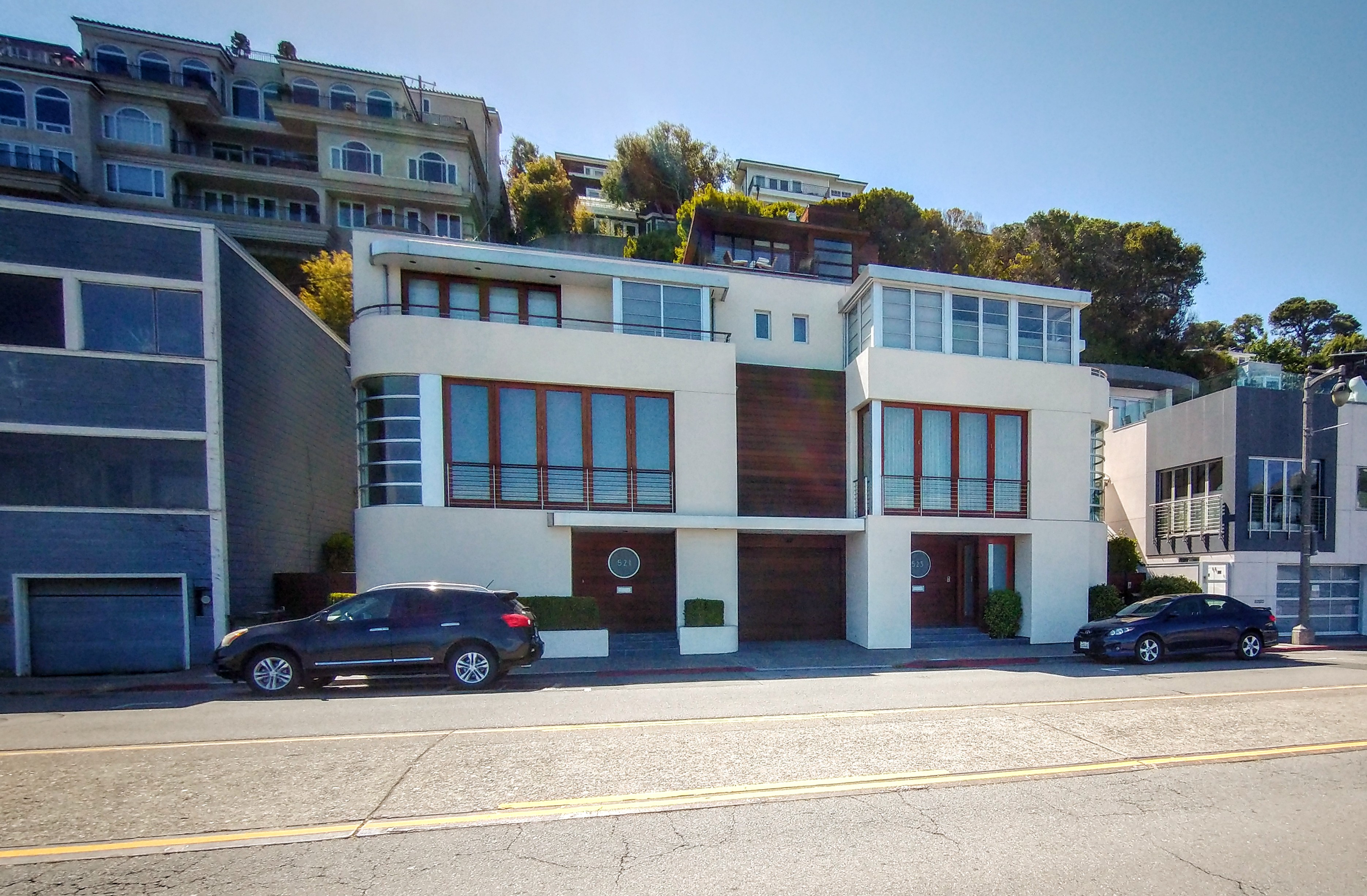
Most zoning laws in California make building any type of multi-family housing illegal like this large modern duplex on the west side of Bridgeway in downtown Sausalito.

A study by Othering and Belonging Institute at University of California, Berkeley in 2024 found that 95.80 percent of total residential land area in California and 30 percent of all land (which includes commercial and park space) area is zoned single-family-only, severely constraining the spatial possibilities for denser and more affordable housing. When unincorporated regions (which include vast swathes of sparsely populated land) are removed from the calculation, the study finds that 82 percent of total residential land area in the state is reserved for single-family housing.

=== Community resistance (NIMBYism) ===
NIMBY ("Not In My Back Yard") resistance by existing residents to new development is a major contributor to the difficulty of developing new housing in the state. People who already live in an area often perceive any new development or change as driving increased negative traffic and population impacts. Using various means (political pressure, protests, and voting power), NIMBYs try to keep newcomers out by defeating development projects in the local government permitting process, or slowing them down to the point that they become uneconomical for the builders.

"Localism" (a seemingly egalitarian belief that incumbent residents have the moral authority to define what their community will look like) has been found to instead result in imbalances which favor white, affluent homeowners, and suggest that localism is more prevalent in planning practice than in the general population. On this issue, The New York Times opinion writer Farhad Manjoo stated: "What Republicans want to do with I.C.E. and border walls, wealthy progressive Democrats are doing with zoning and NIMBYism. Preserving "local character", maintaining "local control", keeping housing scarce and inaccessible — the goals of both sides are really the same: to keep people out." He added that though NIMBYism is a bipartisan sentiment "but because the largest American cities are populated and run by Democrats — many in states under complete Democratic control — this sort of nakedly exclusionary urban restrictionism is a particular shame of the left".

In 2022, California governor Gavin Newsom declared that "NIMBYism is destroying the state" and promised to hold cities and counties accountable for stopping new housing development.

==== NIMBYism and the unhoused ====
Unhoused populations in California feel the impact of NIMBYism. California has one of the country's largest homeless populations, concentrated in urban centers. NIMBY attitudes extend to unhoused people, as residents oppose their presence in local areas and near neighborhoods. Localism has influenced how neighborhoods are shaped to exclude homeless people, resulting in anti-homeless infrastructure and laws.

The rise in homeless vagrancy laws, also considered NIMBY laws, criminalizes general unhoused behaviors rather than specific illegal activities. Examples like Berkeley's "3x3 Ordinance" of 2018 restrict homeless individuals to a 3' x 3' square on the street, with defiance leading to criminal punishment. There has been a severe uptick in vagrancy-related arrests, which encompass a wide range of activities. This involves panhandling, tents, and lying down in public spaces. Such laws disproportionately affect homeless people, perpetuating their displacement and poverty. Moreover, individuals experiencing homelessness and facing arrest are less likely to be accepted into housing programs, welfare programs, or receive necessary healthcare. This is because many of these programs require favorable legal records to receive aid. This cycle highlights how anti-homeless laws can increase the incidence of homelessness.

In one particular case, that of People's Park in Berkeley, support for homeless residents clashes with the push for housing development by the University of California, Berkeley. The park became the center of conflict between local anti-homeless lobbies and park advocates, exemplifying the persisting NIMBY sentiments at the local level. Laws and ordinances aimed at limiting the visibility of the unhoused at the local level contradict the prioritization of health and housing at the state level. California State is supportive of "Housing First" policies.

=== Environmental laws ===
Environmental laws—primarily the California Environmental Quality Act (CEQA)—can be a hurdle to housing development. CEQA requires the permitting agency, usually a local government, to review each new project in accordance with CEQA to provide a full disclosure of the project's impacts to the approval body (usually a planning commission or city council) and the public. Individual single-family homes are exempt, as well as some smaller multi-family projects, but most mid-size and larger projects must go through a Negative Declaration or EIR to provide the required level of disclosure of project impacts. The EIR process requires the developer to conduct studies and provide a report on a wide variety of impacts including traffic congestion, wildfire evacuation, fire safety, noise, air pollution, greenhouse gas emissions, water pollution, biological resources, cultural resources and infrastructure impacts and develop a plan to help mitigate any impacts if any exist. The CEQA process is intended to make the approval process transparent to the public and decision-makers and takes place prior to a local government acting to permit a new development. Additionally, CEQA allows for legal challenges against the CEQA review process itself which may result in lawsuits by those who oppose the project and find the developer did not properly study the impacts from a project prior to the local government approving the project. Litigation is the main enforcement mechanism by which CEQA violations are mitigated. A report by the California Legislative Analyst's Office found that in the state's 10 largest cities, CEQA appeals delayed projects by an average of two and a half years.

According to the Hoover Institution, environmentalists that are hostile to development can use CEQA as a "NIMBY" shield, dragging developers to court. Developers can use the law as a means of choking a rival's business. Labor interests use it as a form of legalized extortion to give them better terms so they don't invoke a CEQA delay.

A 2015 study by Jennifer Hernandez and others at the environmental and land-use law firm Holland & Knight, looking at all CEQA lawsuits filed during the three-year period 2010–2012, found that less than 15% were filed by groups with prior records of environmental advocacy. This study also found that four of five CEQA lawsuits targeted infill development projects; only 20 percent of CEQA lawsuits were targeted at "greenfield" projects that would develop open space.

Carol Galante, a professor of Affordable Housing and Urban Policy at the Terner Center for Housing Innovation at UC Berkeley, who served in the Obama Administration as the Assistant Secretary at the U.S. Department of Housing and Urban Development (HUD), stated that "It (CEQA) has been abused in this state for 30 years by people who use it when it has nothing to do with an environmental reason, ... NIMBY-ism is connected to the fact that for everyone who owns their little piece of the dream, there's no reason to want development next door to them, CEQA gives them a tool to effectuate their interest ... We need to fundamentally rethink how the CEQA process works in this state."

In an interview with UCLA's Blueprint magazine, Governor Jerry Brown commented on the use of CEQA for other than environmental reasons: "But it's easier to build in Texas. It is. And maybe we could change that. But you know what? The trouble is the political climate, that's just kind of where we are. Very hard to — you can't change CEQA [the California Environmental Quality Act]. BP: Why not? JB: The unions won't let you because they use it as a hammer to get project labor agreements. The environmentalists like it because it's the people’s document that you have to disclose all the impacts. And, of course, the developers have a problem because "impact," boy, that’s a big word. Everything’s an impact. I pound on the table, that’s an impact [POUNDING ON THE TABLE]. You know what I mean?"

Jerry Brown also famously called CEQA reform "the Lord's work".

While CEQA's original intent must remain intact, now is the time to end reckless abuses of this important law – abuses that are threatening California's economic vitality, costing jobs and wasting valuable taxpayer dollars. ... Today, CEQA is too often abused by those seeking to gain a competitive edge, to leverage concessions from a project or by neighbors who simply don't want any new growth in their community – no matter how worthy or environmentally beneficial a project may be. - Former Governors George Deukmejian, Pete Wilson, and Gray Davis in a 2013 editorial in The Sacramento Bee

A CEQA study (commissioned by the Rose Foundation, an environmental advocacy group) done by BAE Urban Economics, estimated that 0.7% of all CEQA projects with review documents had been subject to litigation, for the years 2013–2015. In San Francisco, the attorney general's office, during an 18-month audit of CEQA in 2012, found that 0.3% of (non-exempt) CEQA projects were subject to lawsuits.

=== Tax structures ===
Partially because Proposition 13 limits the property tax that local and state governments can collect, cities are incentivized to permit commercial development rather than residential development. Commercial development can potentially yield both sales tax revenue (car dealerships and shopping malls are examples of favored development due to their density of revenue), as well as business tax revenue (many cities levy either a payroll tax or a gross-receipts tax on all businesses located within their boundaries).

Residential development is typically seen as a net loss to a city's budget due to costs associated with service delivery (public safety, roads, parks, etc.) to residents exceeding the tax revenue received from those residents. For example, the city of Brisbane, when considering developing a greenfield (Brisbane Baylands development), was told that a housing-heavy development would bring in $1 million annually in additional income for the town, but a commercial development with no housing and a larger hotel would bring in $9 million annually—and that without building hotels, the development would be a net loss to the city budget.

California's Prop 13 limited annual increases in home value assessments to a maximum of 2.0% for property tax purposes and capped property tax rates to a maximum of 1.0% of assessed value. This produces a "lock-in effect" which reduces the supply of housing while raising housing prices. This effect (which is concurrent with reduction of municipal government funding via reduced property tax revenues) was noted to have occurred much more strongly in coastal California cities than those further inland.

=== High land cost and low density ===
High land cost and low-density development with very small increases in housing density, which in turn keep land prices high. The Sacramento Bee notes that residential land prices are more than 600% greater in coastal California than the average of America's other large metropolitan areas.

=== Coastal Commission ===
With quasi-judicial authority over zoning on the coastline and up to 5-mile inland (8.0 km), the California Coastal Commission has been an added hurdle for citizens and cities seeking to build housing. The commission was formed over opposition to the Sea Ranch development preventing access to the beach. Specific housing developments opposed by the Commission include 895 homes in Orange County, 50 homes for the disabled in Half Moon Bay, and 400 apartment units in Ventura County. The Commission sets fees and fines for permit violations and has levied million-dollar penalties. It has been called the single most powerful land use authority in the United States given the high values of its jurisdiction and its vast environmental assets, and that, because its members are appointed by the governor and the State Senate and Assembly leaders which have generally been Democrats, the Commission reflects a constituency that is important to Democrats. Some research has examined its effects in particular:

- UCLA researchers documented that quality-adjusted homes inside the commission's jurisdiction were 20% more expensive than those just outside it because of restrictions on housing supply and enhancements to natural amenities that increase demand.
- A UCSB research paper found that the Commission increased housing prices by restricting supply thereby "harming renters, future home buyers, and owners of undeveloped land", but existing homeowners in the commission's jurisdiction were beneficiaries of home price increases.

=== Construction costs ===
The state levies higher development fees for building a single-family home than in the rest of the country on average. The California Legislative Analyst's Office reported it to be 266% greater, $22k vs. $6k. For example, the developer planning to redevelop the site of a former Naval Hospital in Oakland with a residential community of 935 homes will be paying $20M (= $21k / home) in fees to the City of Oakland's affordable housing fund.

Labor costs are higher because of prevailing wage laws and that some projects are only approved if union labor is used. This was estimated at 20% more by the California LAO. Multiple studies have estimated the contribution of prevailing wage requirements to total construction cost to be between a 0% and 37% percent increase, with a study finding a 0% cost increase (taking into account increased worker productivity and savings from decreased public subsidies) and all other studies finding at least a 9% cost increase.

Material costs are higher due to building codes and standards requiring better quality materials and higher energy efficiency.

=== Insurance costs ===
CalMatters detailed in August 2024 how rising home insurance costs in the state were impacting landlords and renters. Renters are also being encouraged to take out renter's insurance policies to hedge against losing their possessions to natural disasters like fire in some parts of the state.

== Effects ==
=== Affordability ===
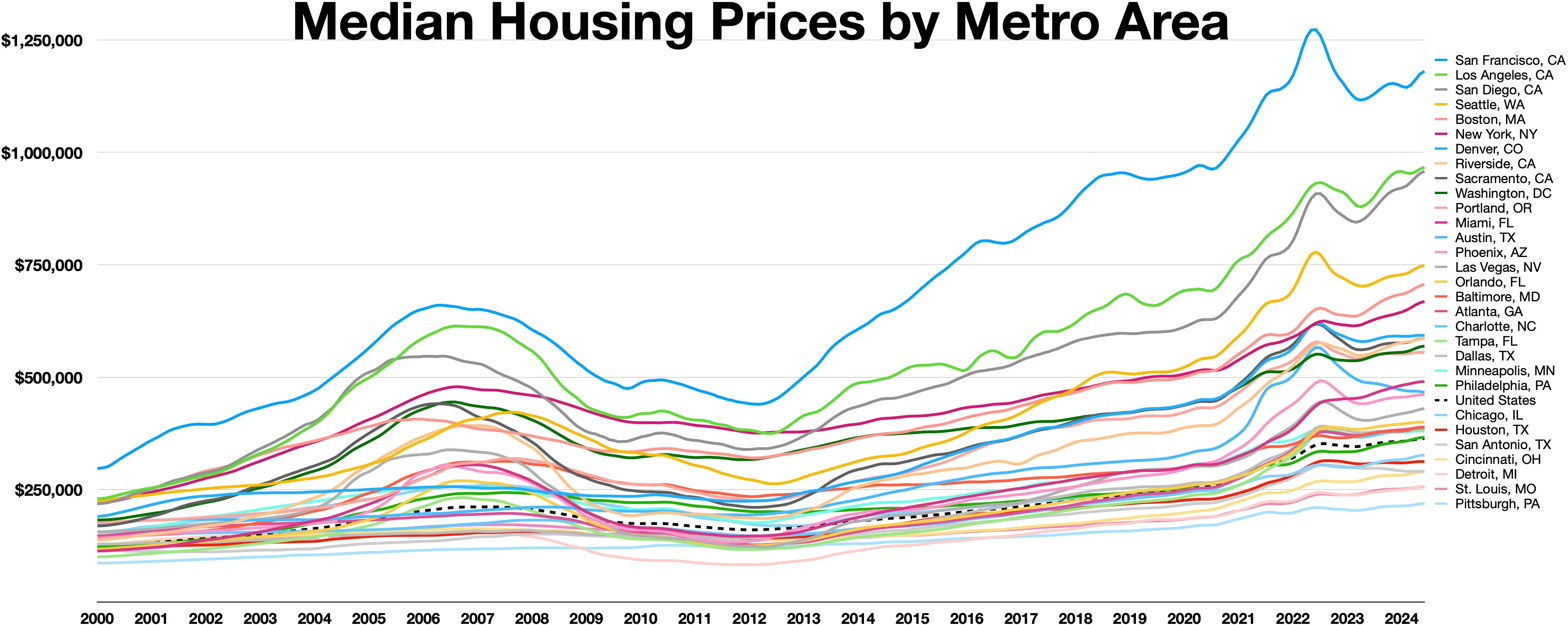
Median Housing Prices by Metro Area

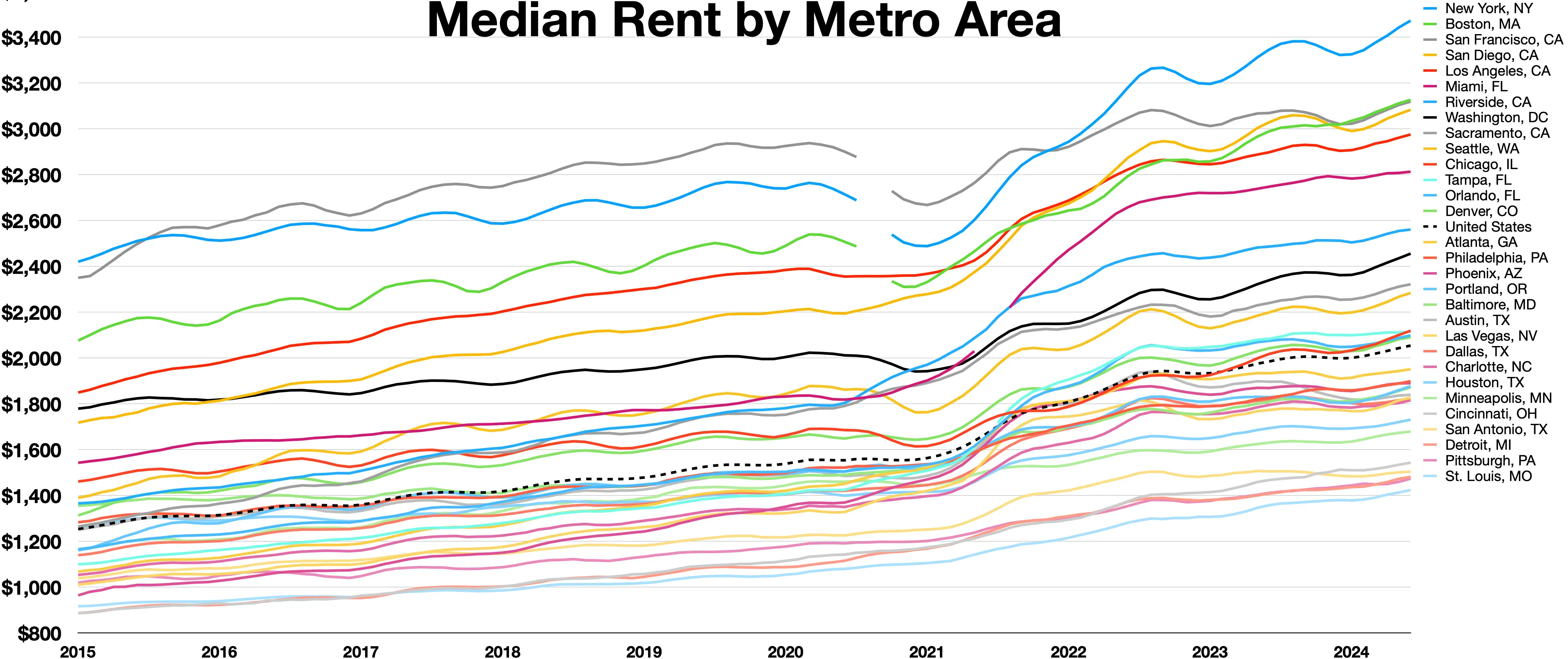
Median rent by metro area

This shortage has driven home prices and rents to extremely high levels. In 2017, the median price of a home in California was more than 2.5 times the median in the U.S. as a whole, and in California's coastal urban areas, the shortage was greater than the inland areas, as demonstrated by the median prices of homes in those respective markets: $1.3M in San Francisco, $1M in San Jose, and $600k in Los Angeles, while only $250k in Fresno. In the rental market, California now has the lowest vacancy rate the state has ever seen, at 3.6%; and while the median rent throughout the state for a two-bedroom apartment is $2,400, the median rent in coastal urban areas is even higher, surpassing $4,000 per month in San Francisco.

In 2023, the housing market in San Diego shows that nearly 60% of homes have listing prices above $1 million. The median home price in the city is $910,000, making it the fourth highest among the 30 largest U.S. cities. The average monthly rent in San Diego has risen to $3,175, placing it as the third-highest in the nation, only $7 less than that of San Francisco.

Housing affordability has declined over the last three decades; as of 2018, less than a third of Californians could afford a median-priced home; in job centers such as the San Francisco Bay Area, that number is less than a quarter. (Nationally, more than half of American households can afford the median-priced American home.) Housing unaffordability also leads to crowding, defined as more than one adult per room of a dwelling (counting two children as one adult). Californians are four times as likely to live in crowded housing as the average American, and this holds across every type of housing—renters, owners, those with and without children.

When comparing the rental rates of Los Angeles and the average rate across the United States one can see just how much higher the city is compared to the rest of the country. While in 2017 the average rental rate in the United States was $1,357, in comparison the average rental rate in Los Angeles in 2017 was $2,284, almost a $1,000 average increase.

=== Displacement and environmental impact ===
As a result, workers have moved to more affordable inland locations which requires longer commutes. As of 2018, the three cities in the United States with the largest share of super commuters—workers spending an hour and a half or more each way to get to and from their jobs—are Stockton, Modesto and Riverside. Workers have been displaced outside of the state as well; from 2007 to 2016, California saw net out-migration among all groups making under $110,000 a year, largely to Sun Belt states like Arizona, Nevada and Texas. New market-rate production can help ease rent pressures, however, if the development is too small it may increase displacement and exclusion pressures for low-income households. Developing at least 100 units of new subsidized housing help alleviate those pressures in most markets. This number may be larger in superstar cities such as San Francisco.

Longer commutes and increased traffic caused by suburban sprawl due to housing shortages concentrated in job centers increase greenhouse gas emissions. Because of California's mild climate and heavily renewable energy mix, transportation is the largest category of emissions in the state. When Californians emigrate to states with higher per-capita greenhouse gas emissions, they drive more, consume more energy for air conditioning, and use more fossil fuel-dependent electricity generation. Scarce, low-density housing is directly at odds with California's climate goals.

"You can't be pro-environment and anti-housing, ... You can't be anti-sprawl and anti-housing. This is something that has not been very well understood." – Marlon Boarnet, chair of the Department of Urban Planning and Spatial Analysis at USC.

Scientists at the Renewable and Appropriate Energy Laboratory at the University of California, Berkeley recently found that infill development, that is utilizing existing vacant urban structures for future housing or commercial use, has the potential to reduce CO_{2} emissions; more so than any other option. Simply put, creating a denser housing structure limits the amount of travel time from work to home and back, thus limiting CO_{2} emissions drastically. At governor Gavin Newsom's first legislative session, he pledged to make the housing crisis one of his top priorities. One such solution is the More Homes Act, which overrides restrictive zoning requirements by implementing small to midsize apartment buildings near major job and transit centers.

=== Poverty ===
When the cost of housing is factored into the poverty rate, as the Census Bureau now does in its releases of the "Supplemental Poverty Measure," California's poverty rate lists as the highest in the nation, (and has since 2011, when the Census Bureau first started releasing poverty by this measure) currently at 20.4%, or just over 1 in 5 people. The Public Policy Institute of California estimates that if the housing costs in California matched those for the nation overall, California's poverty rate would instead be 14 percent.

=== Homelessness ===
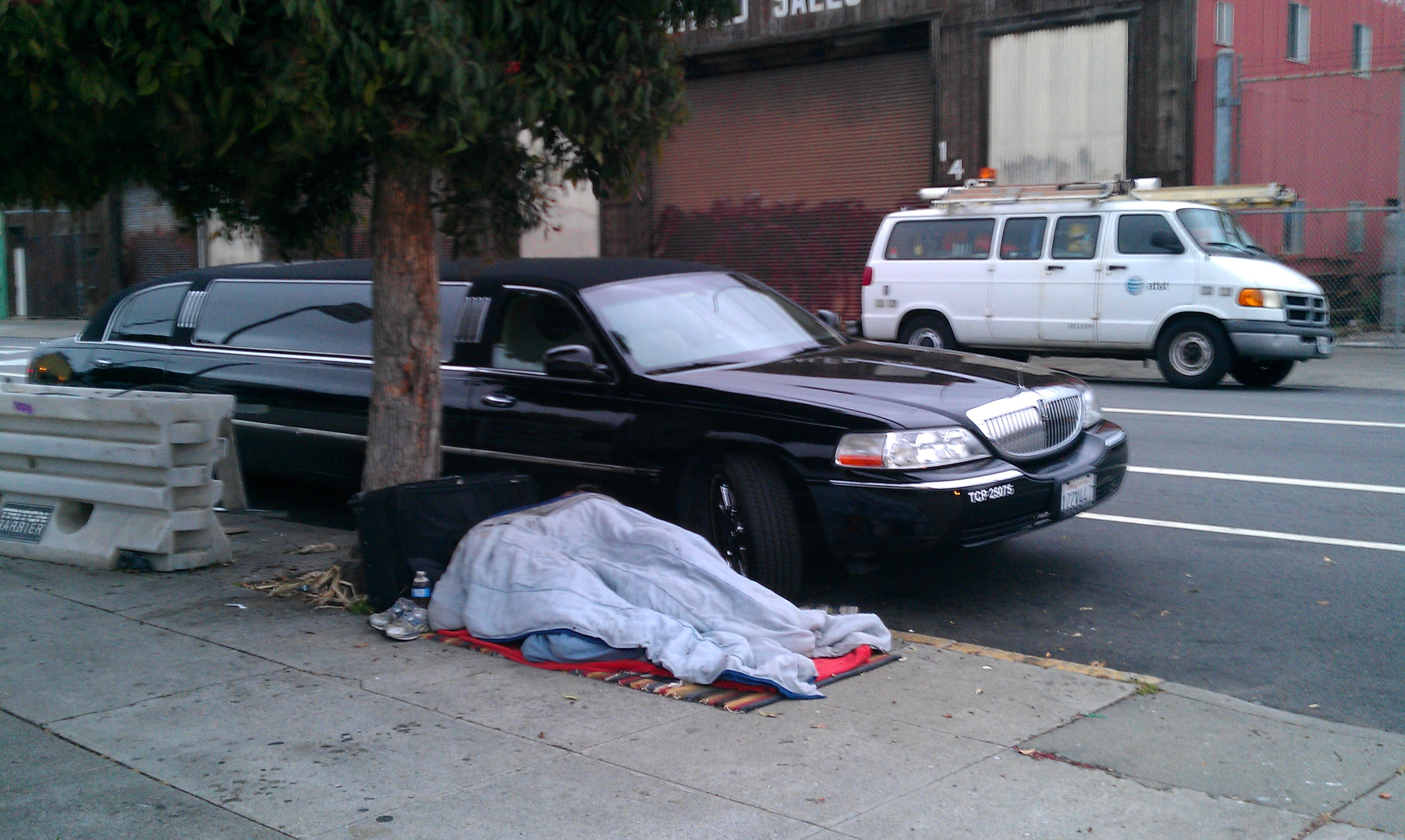
A homeless person sleeps on the sidewalk next to a limousine in the Mission area of San Francisco.

California in 2017 was home to an oversized share of the nation's homeless: 22%, for a state whose residents only make up 12% of the country's total population. The Sacramento Bee notes that large cities like Los Angeles and San Francisco both attribute their increases in homeless to the housing shortage. Homeless persons in California now number 135,000 (a 15% increase from 2015).

A study by the California Housing Partnership found that from 2016 to 2017 homelessness increased by 47 percent in Sacramento County (home to the state's capital, Sacramento), 36 percent in Alameda County, and 13 percent in Santa Clara County.

In 2024 California ranked first in the nation for number of homeless residents - with nearly a quarter of the total homeless population residing in the state.

A study by Wharton School economists Desin Lin and Susan Wachter in 2019 concluded that the average marginal effect of regulation on housing prices in California is an increase of approximately 3% (with the average California city as the regulatory reference point). When referenced to the average level of regulation in the U.S., the total regulatory effect is estimated to be four times larger. It estimated that Los Angeles is the city where housing prices are most impacted by regulations and that if it relaxed all of its land use regulations to the levels of least regulated cities, the drop in housing prices would be approximately 25 percent.

=== Economy ===
A 2017 study by Nobel Laureate in economics Edward Prescott, Lee Ohanian (senior fellow at the Hoover Institution), and Kyle Herkenhoff, estimates that if California were to roll back its land use regulations to where they stood in 1980, the state's GDP could permanently increase by almost $400 billion (a 14% increase). "If every state rolled back land regulations to 1980 levels, [total US] GDP could rise by as much as $1.8 trillion [9%]."

A McKinsey Global Institute report estimates that the housing shortage is costing the California economy between $143 and $233 billion dollars per year, from lost construction activity (at least $85 billion annually), lower consumption of consumer goods because of high housing costs (at least $53 billion annually) and the costs of providing services to the increased number of homeless persons (at least $5 billion per year).

== Quantifying the shortage ==
=== Estimated under-supply of housing units ===
Persons per housing unit for California and for the United States since 1940 View source data.

The California Legislative Analyst's Office 2015 report "California's High Housing Costs – Causes and Consequences" estimates that for the state to have kept housing prices no more than 80% higher than the median for the U.S. as a whole (the price differential which existed in 1980, as opposed to the >150% differential which exists today), California would have needed to add approximately 210,000 new housing units each year over the past three decades (1980–2010), rather than the 120,000 / year which were built. Their midpoint estimate of underbuilding for the last three decades is 90,000 units per year, resulting in an estimated shortage of 2.7 million housing units (20%) by 2010.

Since 2010, the state's construction of new housing units has averaged well below 90,000 units per year. It took a drop after the 2008 Great Recession, but has increased to about 90,000 / year in 2016.

In September 2017, a team of economists from UCLA Anderson Forecast, led by Jerry Nickelsburg, predicted that "it would take 20 percent more housing to achieve a 10 percent reduction in prices. Such a reduction throughout California would bring costs down roughly to 2014 levels..." In a 2018 UCLA Anderson Forecast report, economist Nickelsburg estimated the shortage at 3 million units.

In October 2017, lieutenant governor and gubernatorial candidate Gavin Newsom said that California should set a goal to produce 3.5 million new homes by 2025. This would require a quadrupling of the current rate of building to almost 400,000 units per year, a rate the state has not experienced since 1954.

In April 2018, state Senator Scott Wiener, author of several bills to reduce the housing shortage, estimated it at 4 million units.

In a 2019 paper, economists Enrico Moretti and Chang-Tai Hsieh analyzed the U.S. housing market and found that if Americans had consistently built housing commensurate with demand, the city of San Francisco would have two million housing units (rather than the 400,000 it has today) and a population of four million people (as opposed to its actual 2022 population of around 815,000), and the greater Bay Area would have five times the population it has today.

In 2023, CalMatters graphed the various estimates of the housing shortage against actual housing production, showing improvements in production in the last decade but a significant gap remaining between the estimates of what would be needed to address the shortage.

=== Increase in housing production needed ===
Experts say that California needs to double its current rate of housing production (85,000 units per year) just to keep up with expected population growth and prevent prices from further increasing, and needs to quadruple the current rate of housing production over the next 7 years in order to for prices and rents to decline.

=== Ratio of residents and jobs to housing units ===
View source data.
Jobs per housing unit for California and for the United States since 1980

In 2018, California ranked 49th among the United States in housing units per resident.

While some people claim that a "healthy" ratio of jobs to housing units is around two, many California metros are far from that, with San Diego at 3.9, Los Angeles at 4.7, and San Francisco at 6.8.

=== Permitting rate ===
From 2013 to 2022, California's local governments (who control the home permitting process) approved 2.6 new housing units per 100 residents, significantly lower than the nationwide average of 3.9. The state had the 37th lowest permitting rate in the country, with some states (Idaho and Utah) permitting at more than double California's rate. While California's permitting rate has been increasing, with the rate having increased 20% for the five years 2018–2022 compared to the previous five years, the state's rate still lags the nation as a whole whose 2018–2022 rate was up 33% compared to 2013–2017.

== Legislation ==
=== Federal ===
In a September 2016 report from the Executive Office of the President of the United States titled "Housing Development Toolkit", the authors cited several of California state and localities' attempted legislative fixes for the housing shortage as models that it recommends other states and localities also follow to abate their housing shortages, including:

- establish by-right development,
- tax vacant land or donate it to non-profit developers,
- streamline or shorten permitting processes and timelines,
- eliminate off-street parking requirements,
- allow accessory dwelling units, and
- establish density bonuses.

The report also highlighted one of President Obama's remarks to the U.S. Conference of Mayors on January 21, 2016:

We can work together to break down rules that stand in the way of building new housing and that keep families from moving to growing, dynamic cities.

=== State ===
==== 2016 Legislative session ====
In September 2016, Governor Jerry Brown signed AB 2406, AB 2299, and SB 1069, all of which reduce the cost and bureaucracy needed to construct an ADU (Accessory Dwelling Unit), also known as a "granny flat" or "in-law unit". The Bay Area Council notes that if only 10 percent of the Bay Area's 1.5 million single family homeowners build ADU's, that would create 150,000 units of new housing.

This change resulted in dramatic increases in applications for ADU building permits; Los Angeles saw 25 times as many applications in the 2017 calendar year than it did in the previous two years combined.

==== 2017 Legislative session ====
In the 2017 legislative session, a package of 15 housing bills was passed. One bill legalizes microapartments as small as 150 sq. ft. and prohibits cities from limiting their numbers near universities or public transit; another (SB 2) adds a $75 real-estate document recording fee (for everything other than property sales), which is projected to generate $250 million per year for affordable housing construction. The total 2017 housing package is expected to have only a minimal impact on the shortage, because even the most optimistic predictions suggest that the measures will increase yearly housing production by about 14,000 units per year, still well short (14%) of the additional 100,000 new units needed yearly (in addition to the 80,000 being produced yearly) just to keep pace with population growth and prevent prices from rising.

===== Senate Bill 35 =====
Another bill was Senate Bill 35 (SB 35), authored by state Senator Scott Wiener which shortens the approval process by eliminating environmental and planning reviews for new infill housing in cities which have failed to meet their state housing production goals. The state sets goals for production of different types of housing: market-rate, low-income, etc., (to keep up with expected population growth) and this law applies only to development types for which the city is not meeting its production goal. To make use of the streamlined approval process, the developer must pay prevailing wage and abide by union-standard hiring rules. Wiener said, "Local control is about how a community achieves its housing goals, not whether it achieves those goals.... SB 35 sets clear and reasonable standards to ensure that all communities are part of the solution by creating housing for our growing population." SB 35 has been used, for example, to redevelop the derelict Vallco Shopping Mall in Cupertino into a mixed-use development containing 2,402 apartments, half of them affordable, with no government subsidies, which will quintuple Cupertino's affordable housing stock.

==== 2018 Legislative session ====
===== Senate Bills 827 and 50 =====
In 2018, Senator Wiener introduced SB 827, which would have required localities to allow buildings of at least 4 or 8 stories within a half-mile of a high-frequency transit stop, or within a quarter-mile of a bus or transit corridor, as well as waiving minimum parking requirements in those areas. The bill was controversial, being opposed both by local governments concerned about the loss of local control of zoning, and by anti-gentrification activists concerned about displacement. The bill was supported by a group of scholars who stated that it would help reduce decades of racial and economic residential segregation, as well as pro-housing groups nationally, and by over 100 San Francisco Bay area technology industry executives who voiced their support of the bill in a joint letter.

Regarding the issue of local control, Wiener said: "In education and healthcare, the state sets basic standards, and local control exists within those standards. Only in housing has the state abdicated its role. But housing is a statewide issue, and the approach of pure local control has driven us into the ditch." Anti-displacement provisions were inserted in response to gentrification concerns. It was subsequently defeated in its first committee hearing.

In December 2018, Senator Wiener introduced a similar bill for the following legislative session, SB 50, which was defeated in a senate floor vote in 2020.

==== 2021 Legislative session ====
In September 2021, Governor Gavin Newsom signed a package of 31 housing bills, including the California HOME Act (SB 9) and SB 10. The California HOME Act (SB 9) upzones most of California to allow building denser housing, up to a fourplex, on a lot. SB 10 streamlines the process for local governments to build dense housing around transit rich areas. Other bills aim to streamline the homebuilding process, reduce barriers to building affordable housing, and hold local governments responsible for building more housing.

Other bills that Governor Newsom signed include SB 290, AB 1584, SB 478, AB 602 and AB 803. SB 290 expands California's density bonus law to include affordable housing for low income college students. Density bonuses allow developers to build denser housing, so long as a portion is set aside for affordable housing. AB 1584 makes void any housing covenants that would prohibit the construction of an ADU in certain circumstances.

SB 478 creates a minimum floor area ratio and a minimum lot size for multi-family housing that's between 3 and 10 units. SB 478 also prevents local governments from imposing a lot coverage requirement that would make it impossible for a housing project to achieve its minimum floor area ratio. AB 602 regulates impact fees that local governments can charge on housing. AB 602 makes impact fees more transparent, and requires local governments to make impact fees proportional to the square footage of the house. AB 803, the Starter Home Revitalization Act of 2021, requires cities and counties to approve an application for a small home lot housing development project on a proposed site to be subdivided unless the city or county makes a finding related to the development's compliance with certain requirements or the development's specific, adverse public health or safety impact.

==== 2022 Legislative session ====
In September 2022, Newsom signed a package of housing bills, including AB 2011, SB 6 and AB 2097.

===== AB 2011 =====
AB 2011 has officially gone into effect as of July 1, 2023. The policy allows for affordable and mixed-income housing to be built on commercially-zoned property on a ministerial, by-right basis, as long as the projects fulfill affordability and environmental criteria, and pay prevailing wage. Additionally there is a requirement for the use of apprenticeship programs that are approved by local governments. When these contracts are being accepted by contractors they will also be provided with health care expenditures. This being a new and more recent Bill studies will be conducted by the Department of Housing and Community Development which will be used to present to legislature on the effects and results of the additional housing developments.

===== SB 6 and AB 2097 =====
SB 6 allows for residential use on commercially zoned property without requiring a rezoning, as long as a percentage of construction workers hired are unionized. AB 2097 removes parking minimums for homes and commercial properties within one mile of public transit stations or in neighborhoods with low rates of car use. California became the second state after Oregon to eliminate parking minimums near public transit.

===== SB 897 and AB 2221 =====
SB 897 and AB 2221 both clarified rules regarding compliance of ADUs with building codes and streamlined permitting.

===== Excess Land for Affordable Housing bills =====
Following up on a 2019 executive order requiring the California Department of General Services to create a digitized inventory of excess state-owned properties and collaborate with the HCD and CalHFA to identify sites on state-owned parcels available for affordable housing, Newsom signed SB 561 and AB 2233 to codify the executive order and generate a periodic progress report to the Legislature. In addition, Newsom signed AB 2592, requiring DGS to provide a report to the Legislature detailing a streamlined plan to transition underutilized multistory state buildings into housing.

==== 2023 Legislative Session ====
In October 2023, Newsom signed another package of housing bills. Notable bills include SB 4, SB 423, SB 555 and AB 1033.

===== SB 4 =====
SB 4 makes it so that religious institutions or higher education institutions can submit applications for streamlined approval for building housing on their lands, granted that it satisfied criteria and that all of the units are made available for lower-income households. The bill is part of a greater movement by faith communities in the U.S. to build affordable housing called "Yes, In God's Backyard." The movement has, in the past, struggled with getting past the red tape over adaptive reuse of their property, especially with city or local opposition. SB 4 is part of a series of California bill efforts since 2020 to make it easier for churches, as well as other faith communities and higher education institutions, to build on their lands, including an assembly bill (AB 1851) which reduced or eliminated parking requirements for such projects. A UC Berkeley study found that this law opens up about 170,000 acres of land (about half the size of Los Angeles) for potential affordable housing development across the state.

===== SB 423 =====
SB 423 comes as an extension of SB 35, a bill that expedites processes for housing developments in areas with higher needs. Such need is assessed using Regional Housing Needs Assessment (RHNA), which was part of what was written into law in SB 35. SB 423 specifically expands the streamlining outlined in SB 35 by allowing the state to supersede the local government in passing the review and to make it easier for multifamily developments in coastal zones. This is a victory for pro-housing advocates, as the California Coastal Commission has been a major source of opposition to housing developments on the coast. Opponents are concerned about the housing threatening the local beach environment and wildlife. Pro-housing advocates argue that housing must be built everywhere, but the coast provides an especially good opportunity as it is nearer to jobs, recreation, and less car-centric living, which ultimately means less pollution. Beyond advocates and opponents, the commission itself historically has blocked almost all housing on the coastal zones, with the consequence being even higher housing prices than in other areas.

===== SB 555 =====
The introduction of SB 555 indicates a shift in housing priorities, turning away from solely the private rental market or homeownership to explore alternative forms of tenure. The bill introduces a plan to implement 1.4 million units of social housing, which is permanently kept from the private market and being bought out. This provides protections for renters and hopes to create a subsection of housing that is not based on speculation and instead creates secure mixed-income communities. The bill first mandates that its department of housing (HCD) completes a California Social Housing Study completed by the end of 2026, which will create recommendations and analysis on social housing and what the best options for the state are.

===== SB 684 =====
SB 684 requires cities to ministerially allow property owners to subdivide multifamily lots to create subdivisions with up to 10 houses, townhouses or condos. At the time of passage, it was not applied to vacant lots in single-family zones.

===== Other 2023 bills =====
- AB 1033: allows homeowners to convert their ADUs into condominiums and sell their ADUs independently of the primary residence.
- AB 1485: authorizes the Attorney General to intervene in a third-party lawsuit against a local government for violation of state housing laws without need for petition to a state court.

==== 2024 Legislative session ====
On August 27, Newsom signed two bills passed to address the crisis, including AB 2835, which allows motels and other temporary housing to allow homeless residents to stay for longer than 30 days without triggering local rent control laws, and AB 3057, which streamlines the approval process for the construction of ADUs by granted same exemption to environmental review for junior ADU ordinances as given to standard ADU ordinances. On September 19, Newsom signed a larger package of bills, including:

- SB 1211, which allows people to build up to eight detached ADUs on a lot, expanding the maximum from two ADUs per lot;
- SB 1164, which allows new ADUs to be exempt from property taxes for up to 15 years;
- SB 312, which streamlines approval for environmentally sustainable student housing;
- SB 937, which allows home builders to delay the payment of local development and impact fees until a certificate of occupancy is issued for their project;
- SB 450, which clarifies the intent of the California HOME Act and allows state agencies to enforce its terms against city governments in court;
- SB 1123, which extends eligibility for projects constructed under SB 684 to vacant lots in single family zones.

==== 2025 legislative session ====
In the aftermath of the January 2025 Southern California wildfires, several bills were filed to further address the shortage.

- AB 253 (Ward), allowing home builders to hire a licensed and certified third-party reviewer (signed into law).
- AB 413 (Fong) would require the HCD to translate key state housing guidelines and handbooks into the non-English languages commonly spoken in California (signed into law)
- AB 507 (Haney), allowing adaptive reuse of existing buildings to be considered a “use by right” in all zoning areas, bypassing traditional conditional use permit processes (signed into law).
- AB 609 (Wicks), which would create a broad CEQA exemption to environmentally-friendly infill housing (signed into law as AB 130);
- AB 648 (Zbur) - Allows community colleges to ignore zoning when build housing for students and staff on college-owned or -leased property (signed into law).
- AB 1061 (Quirk-Silva), allowing the HOME Act to be used in designated historic districts as long as an existing historic structure is not altered or demolished (signed into law);
- AB 1154 (Carrillo), which aligns standards for all ADUs under 500 square feet (signed into law);
- AB 1308 (Hoover), establishing a 10-day period for inspecting small residential projects (signed into law);
- SB 9 (Arreguín), which would authorize the HCD to void any local ADU ordinances which violate state law and apply state ADU standards until the local government passes remedial measures (signed into law);
- SB 79 (Wiener), which would allow upzoning and rezoning near rail stations, rapid bus lines and other transit-oriented development zones within a half-mile of public transit stops, including in areas currently zoned only for single-family homes (signed into law);
- SB 315 (Grayson) imposes limits on local park fees for infill housing and establishes oversight over application of fees (became 2-year bill)
- SB 484 (Laird)- Pilot program to allow housing in 3 areas in the coastal zone without having to get a coastal permit (signed into law).
- SB 543 (McNerney) codifies existing HCD guidance regarding ADUs and Junior ADUs (JADUs) (signed into law)
- SB 607 (Wiener), which would limit the focus of CEQA-based environmental review of projects (signed into law as SB 131);
- SB 677 (Wiener), which would have amended the HOME Act, SB 423 and the Coastal Act to further streamline the ministerial approval process of duplexes, lot splits and certain multifamily units, was defeated in the Senate Housing Committee and converted to a two-year bill for reconsideration in January 2026;
- SB 838 (Durazo), narrows the scope of the Housing Accountability Act by excluding mixed-use projects with any transient lodging, such as hotels and AirBnBs, from streamlined housing protections and ensuring that only long-term residential projects benefit (sent to the governor).

Newsom endorsed both SB 607 and AB 609. The text of both bills were incorporated into must-pass state budget legislation (SB 607 into SB 131, AB 609 into AB 130), and both were passed by the legislature on June 30, 2025, with Newsom signing both bills into law on the same day. The passage of AB 130 exempted most infill housing projects statewide from CEQA review for the first time.

In addition, as part of the reorganization of the BCSH within the budget, Newsom proposed splitting off the California Department of Housing and Community Development, California Interagency Council on Homelessness, California Housing Finance Agency and the Civil Rights Department, from the BCSH into a separate cabinet-level superagency, the California Housing and Homelessness Agency (CHHA), as well as the creation of a Housing Development and Finance Committee (HDFC) within the new agency to streamline policies on affordable housing funds. The proposal would also rename the remaining agency as the Business and Consumer Services Agency (BCSA). The proposal was approved by the Little Hoover Commission and did not receive a veto from either house, allowing the proposal to proceed to completion by June 2026.

==== 2026 legislative session ====
- AB 2074 (Haney): titled the Downtown Revitalization Act, would require the seven largest transit-rich municipalities in California to designate at least one regional transit hub district within each downtown area, that each regional transit hub district allow for construction of "downtown housing development" projects meeting certain requirements (150-foot height baseline, requiring at least 25% of the designated transit district to allow 450 feet or more) and eligible for streamlined ministerial approval, and requiring CalHFA to conduct a housing construction loan and financing study (signed into law September 29, 2026);
- SB 1014 (Grayson): would require cities to disclose infrastructure requirements within 30 days of initial application and prohibit cities from adding new requirements after submission of the permit application (signed into law September 29, 2026).
- SB 1117 (Cervantes): would require local governments to charge only proportional fees for ADU square footage above 750 square feet for the first two ADUs on a property, prohibiting local governments from charging a full impact fee per square feet above 750 feet (signed into law September 29, 2026);
- SB 1116 (Caballero): would make technical changes to the SHRA to reduce interference from local governments (signed into law September 29, 2026);
- AB 956 (Quirk-Silva): would allow homeowners to build up to two detached ADUs on their properties, and prohibit Homeowner associations from interference with construction of ADUs compliant with state law (signed into law September 29, 2026);
- SB 677 (Wiener): would limit third-party appeals of subdivision maps for urban infill housing and authorize the State Treasurer to grant approval for federally-funded affordable housing projects in the case of a delay by a local government agency (sent to the governor).

=== County and municipal ===
==== Sacramento ====
In February 2024 (implemented in March 2024), the city of Sacramento passed the 2040 General Plan which updated the zoning code to eliminate parking minimums citywide for new housing. In addition, the General Plan eliminated caps on the number of units that can be built in a single-family zone, instead allowing for property owners to construct multi-unit housing based on a floor area ratio citywide. In September 2024, the city council passed an ordinance allowing small apartment buildings up to three stories tall in all residential areas previously zoned for single-family housing, but maintained existing bulk control standards.

==== San Francisco Bay Area reforms ====
The city council of Berkeley voted unanimously on June 27, 2025 to repeal its 109-year-old single-family zoning ordinance and legalize three-story buildings with up to eight units each on a 5,000 sq ft lot, not including ADUs, throughout most of the city except for certain hilly neighborhoods. The ordinance is set for a second reading in July 2025, with implementation intended for November 2025.

==== Greater Los Angeles ====
After passing a downzoning ordinance which reduced the allowable square footage in single-family homes, Culver City was sued in state court, with plaintiffs arguing that the ordinance violated the Housing Crisis Act of 2019. The city lost the case in state court and lost a subsequent appeal, after which the city repealed the downzoning ordinance on January 22, 2024. Following elections which shifted the majority, the Culver City council passed an ordinance abolishing parking mandates citywide in October 2022. On September 30, 2025, the city council unanimously passed an ordinance legalizing single-stair construction of apartments.

==== Parking mandates repeal ====
As of 2024, parking mandates have been repealed citywide in Sacramento, Culver City, Alameda, Emeryville, San Francisco and San Jose.

== Responses ==
Since 2014, several YIMBY (Yes In My Back Yard) groups have been created in the San Francisco Bay Area. These groups lobby both locally and in Sacramento for increased housing production at all price levels, as well as using California's Housing Accountability Act ("the anti-NIMBY law") to sue cities when they attempt to block or downsize housing development. One activist, in a comment to the San Francisco Planning Commission supporting the construction of a new 75-unit mostly market rate housing development stated that: "The 100 or so higher income people, who are not going to live in this project if it isn't built, are going to live somewhere...They will just displace someone somewhere else, because demand doesn't disappear."

The Housing Authority of the City of Los Angeles closed its Section 8 wait list for over a decade due to high demand, and only reopened in 2017.

As of 2018, there were over 400,000 deed or use-restricted affordable housing units in California which were built with the provision that they remain affordable for the following decades (generally between 30 and 55 years) in exchange for subsidies. The state's Department of Housing and Community Development (HCD) estimates that there are more than 35,000 units whose affordability requirement will expire by 2021 and that many of these will likely be converted to market rent units. HCD has made the preservation of these units as affordable housing a priority.

Under the federal government's Section 8 voucher system, residents pay 30% of their salary and the Housing Authority pays the difference of the rental cost. As indicated by Metcalf (2018), "In 2015, 2.2 million households, comprising 5 million people, used rental vouchers to secure housing in the private market" though these figures are for the entire United States. Unlike other public assistance programs (such as SNAP or Medicaid) there are only a limited number of Section 8 vouchers, meaning that most people who apply and qualify for the program are not able to participate in the program, and instead are placed on a wait lists for years.

In April 2024, The Los Angeles Times reported, "California has spent $20 billion over the past five years dedicated to the state’s homelessness crisis... Still, homelessness grew 6% in 2023 from the year prior, to more than 180,000 people." In an opinion column for the conservative National Review, Jack Crowe wrote of this, "Rather than helping people get back on their feet, California’s vast, unaccountable homeless-industrial complex — comprising nine state agencies and more than 30 individual programs — appears to be creating an ever-growing population of dependents."

== See also ==
- San Francisco housing shortage
- Affordable housing in Silicon Valley
- 2000s United States housing market correction
- Safe parking programs § California
- Rent Relief Act
