= Hafner =

Hafner may refer to:

== Surname ==
- Anton Hafner (1918–1944), German former Luftwaffe fighter ace
- Benjamin Hafner (1821–1899), American locomotive engineer
- Christian Hafner (born 1972), Italian luger
- Dorinda Hafner, optician, nurse, storyteller, actress, dancer, writer, television chef
- Edo Hafner (born 1955), retired Slovenian professional ice hockey player
- Frank Hafner (1867–1957), Major League Baseball player
- Fritz Hafner (1877–1964), Austrian-German painter and visual arts educator
- Genevieve Hafner, French photographer based in New York City
- Gerald Häfner (born 1956), German politician
- Herta Hafner, Italian luger
- Ingrid Hafner (1936–1994), British actress
- Josef Hafner (1799-1891), Austrian lithographer
- Josef Anton Hafner (1709–1756), German painter
- Kai Häfner (born 1989), German handball player
- Katie Hafner, journalist, writes books and articles about technology and society
- Ludwig Hafner (1921–1942), German Luftwaffe ace
- Nuala Hafner, Australian media personality
- Philipp Hafner (1735–1764), Austrian farce writer
- Raoul Hafner (1905–1980), Austrian-born British helicopter pioneer and engineer
- Reinhard Hafner (born 1952), German footballer and coach
- Sabrina Hafner (born 1984), Swiss bobsledder
- Thomas Hafner, realistic and fantastic art painter
- Travis Hafner (born 1977), left-handed hitting designated hitter
- Wolfgang Hafner (born 1965), German jazz drummer

== Other uses ==
- Großer Hafner, a mountain in the Alps
- Grosser Hafner, Prehistoric pile dwelling settlement in Switzerland
- Kleiner Hafner, Prehistoric pile dwelling settlement in Switzerland
- Hafner Manufacturing Company, Chicago maker of clockwork-powered O gauge toy trains
- Hafner A.R.III Gyroplane, British 1930s experimental autogyro
- Hafner Rotabuggy, British experimental aircraft
- Hafner Rotachute, British 1940s experimental one-man rotor kite
- Hafner-Sarnak-McCurley constant, mathematical constant

== See also ==
- Haffner (disambiguation)
- Häfner
- Hefner (disambiguation)
- Hafer
