= 2017 United States federal hiring freeze =

US government policy

Presidential Memorandum Regarding the Hiring Freeze
- Hiring Freeze
- Presidential Memorandum Regarding the Hiring Freeze
- Other short titles: Hiring Freeze
- Type: Presidential memorandum
- President: Donald Trump
- Signed: January 23, 2017

Federal Register details
- Federal Register document number: 2017-01842
- Publication date: January 25, 2017 End date: April 12, 2017
- Document citation: 82 FR 8493

Summary
- Institutes a hiring freeze on all positions relating to "Federal civilian employees" that were vacant as of noon on January 22, 2017, including creation of new positions; Exempts military positions or those with "national security or public safety responsibilities" from the hiring freeze; Forbids employment of contractors when such employment is intended "to circumvent the intent of [the] memorandum"; Instructs the Directors of the Office of Personnel Management and the Office of Management and Budget to produce a plan by April 23, 2017 to "reduce the size of the Federal Government's workforce through attrition".

The 2017 United States federal hiring freeze was instituted by the Presidential Memorandum signed by President Donald Trump on January 23, 2017. Trump and Office of Management and Budget Director Mick Mulvaney ordered the hiring freeze lifted on April 12, 2017.

== Provisions ==
The order instituted a 90-day hiring freeze for United States federal employees, after which it was to be replaced by a long-term workforce reduction plan to be developed by the Office of Personnel Management. The order bans hiring contractors to fill positions that would otherwise be filled by employees. The hiring freeze does not affect military personnel and those deemed essential for security, but the details of implementation rules have been clarified over time with multiple sets of guidance listing exceptions.

== History ==
The hiring freeze follows similar measures instituted by Jimmy Carter and Ronald Reagan. In 1982, the Government Accounting Office issued a report on the impact of these freezes and found they had "little effect on Federal employment levels" and "disrupted agency operations, and in some cases, increased costs to the Government." This was because government agencies, rather than hire more contractors, had to pay overtime to existing employees, which is more expensive.

In December 2010, President Obama issued Executive Order 13561 carrying out a two-year federal employee pay freeze. Two years later, on December 27, 2012, he issued a new order, Executive Order 13635, which would end the pay freeze and give civilian federal employees a 0.5% raise in 2013. Congress then proposed legislation that would continue the pay freeze. In 2013, Federal employees endured sequestration-related furloughs as well as several unpaid days related to government shutdown. In November 2016, President Obama enacted a freeze on the hiring of Senior Executive Service positions. The size of the federal workforce ended Obama's administration essentially unchanged, increasing to 2.8 million from 2.79 million, and below the peak of 3.15 million during the Reagan administration.

Prior to becoming president, Trump indicated that he would institute a hiring freeze. In late October 2016, he revealed a six-point plan for his first 100 days; the second of these six was "a hiring freeze on all federal employees to reduce federal workforce through attrition (exempting military, public safety, and public health)" In a November 14, 2016, press conference, President Barack Obama had urged Trump to reconsider his proposed freeze, noting that, since 1967, the country's population increased 136%, the private sector workforce increased 67%, and the federal workforce has increased 10%.

The order was signed as one of the first executive actions of the Trump Administration in a ceremony that also included orders for the withdrawal of the United States from the Trans-Pacific Partnership, and for reimposing the Mexico City Policy banning foreign non-governmental organizations that receive federal funding from performing or promoting abortion services. Following the signing ceremony, White House Press Secretary Sean Spicer addressed the press corps on hiring freeze and other issues. He said that the order "counters the dramatic expansion of the federal workforce in recent years." Several articles pointed to the lack of a factual basis for this statement.

The hiring freeze was lifted by Budget Director Mick Mulvaney on April 12, 2017.

== Scope of freeze ==
Trump initially stated on January 23 that the hiring freeze does not affect "the military" and personnel associated with public safety. After two days of confusion, the Office of Management and Budget and the Office of Personnel Management clarified on January 25 that the freeze would not apply to public healthcare workers at the Department of Veterans Affairs, but would apply to Department of Defense civilians. On January 31, OMB and OPM issued more guidance with several more exceptions to the hiring freeze. In this guidance, the freeze does not apply to agencies under the following circumstances:

- Presidential appointees, regardless of Senate confirmation (includes political Senior Executive Service members)
- Seasonal and other short-term employees to meet "traditionally recurring seasonal workloads" such as National Park Service rangers (must be pre-approved by OMB)
- U.S. Postal Service hires
- Civilians hired by the Office of the Director of National Intelligence and the Central Intelligence Agency
- Appointments in the Pathways Internship and Presidential Management Fellows programs and related conversions to permanent positions in those programs, and in conjunction with the Veterans Recruitment Act
- Hirings in conjunction with 5 C.F.R. § 213.3102(r) (time limited positions in support of fellowship or professional/industry exchange programs)
- Placement of federal employees with restoration rights accorded by law, such as restoration after absence with injury compensation and restoration after military duty
- Job offers made prior to January 22, 2017, for which the person has a confirmed start date on or before February 22, 2017. Those people should report to work according to their designated start dates. (Job offers made prior to January 22, 2017, but which have a confirmed start date later than February 22, 2017 (or no confirmed start date), should be decided on a case-by-case basis and must go through an agency-head review.)
- Reassignments or details of current employees within an agency or between agencies, as well as voluntary transfers of senior executives between agencies, under certain circumstances.

Further, OMB guidance declared that "The head of any agency may exempt any positions that it deems necessary to: Meet national security (including foreign relations) responsibilities, or Meet public safety responsibilities (including essential activities to the extent that they protect life and property). Agencies may refer to longstanding guidance, which provides examples of such activities in OMB Memorandum. Agency Operations in the Absence of Appropriations."

== Impacts and reactions ==
The hiring freeze was criticized by Democratic members of Congress, veterans' advocates, advocates for disabled people, and others.

Harry Stein, director of fiscal policy at the Center for American Progress, criticized the freeze, predicting that it "will have profound negative consequences throughout the country." Stein and others cited a 1982 GAO report analyzing hiring freezes during the Reagan and Carter administrations, which determined that the freezes caused disruption to government services without saving funds. At a House Oversight and Government Reform Committee hearing on February 15, 2017, Comptroller General of the United States Gene L. Dodaro, the head of the Government Accountability Office, said: "We've looked at hiring freezes in the past by prior administrations and they haven't proven to be effective in reducing costs and they cause some problems if they're in effect for a long period of time." Dodaro noted that the hiring freeze posed a risk to the government, particularly in areas with a "skill gaps" such as cybersecurity and acquisition workforce. Dodaro said that if reducing the size of the federal workforce was a goal, "a sustained hiring freeze is not the best way. It’s better to do it through a budget or workforce plan."

Federal employees' unions criticized the freeze and questioned the notion that there were too many federal employees, noting that there are about as many federal employees today as there were in 1962 under the John F. Kennedy administration.

=== Impact on veterans and the military ===
Because veterans make up one-third of all federal employees, the hiring freeze were seen as disproportionately likely to be affect veterans. The extent of the impact of the freeze on the VA was unclear, with the White House and the VA sending out conflicting signals. Many veterans had VA job interviews delayed or canceled. Paul Rieckhoff, the chief executive of Iraq and Afghanistan Veterans of America, said that the freeze "sent shock waves across the entire veteran community" and "raises serious concerns about the president’s commitment to veterans and improving the VA." Disabled American Veterans said that the situation was confusing. VoteVets slammed the inclusion of the VA, saying "If his executive order leads to preventable deaths, that will be on Donald Trump’s hands, and we will hold him personally accountable." The Republican chairs of the House and Senate Veterans' Affairs Committees wrote a letter asking for clarification, while the Democratic ranking members of the House and Senate Veterans' Affairs Committees of those committees, joined by 53 other congressional Democrats, asked Trump to explicitly exclude the U.S. Department of Veterans Affairs from the hiring freeze.

Several days after the hiring freeze was announced, following this backlash, the acting Secretary of Veterans Affairs Robert Snyder issued a memo saying that certain VA positions, such as physicians and nurses, would be exempted from the freeze.

The confusion following the hiring freeze hit parent in the U.S. military. In late February 2017, the commander of the U.S. Army Garrison Wiesbaden, in Germany informed Army parents that all part-day childcare programs at the garrison would end on March 1 as a "result of staff shortages due to the Federal Hiring Freeze" that prevented childcare services "from replacing staff who depart for any reason." A similar memo was issued at Fort Knox in Kentucky. Subsequently, waivers were granted for Fort Knox and Garrison Wiesbaden, but the freeze still interrupted service and disrupted hiring at those sites and elsewhere. The hiring freeze also caused disruption in Navy shipbuilding, which Navy officials said was counterproductive.

=== Other impacts and reactions ===
Federal employees' organizations condemned the hiring freeze, with the National Federation of Federal Employees saying that it would "will cripple employment opportunities particularly for women, veterans, minorities and the disabled." The National Active and Retired Federal Employees Association also opposed the freeze, saying it would save no money. The National Treasury Employees Union, American Federation of Government Employees, and other unions similarly criticized the freeze.

The hiring freeze caused fears among employees at federal scientific agencies such as the Environmental Protection Agency (EPA), NASA, the National Oceanic and Atmospheric Administration (NOAA), and National Science Foundation (NSF), all of which are subject to the freeze. Scientists feared that the freeze might become permanent or be a precursor to deeper budget cuts.

The hiring freeze was seen as likely to worsen the delay in adjudicating Social Security Disability applications, which already has a 526-day backlog. On January 27, 2017, Budget Director Mulvaney addressed the issue briefly stating, "I don’t think you’re wrong to be concerned about it, Senator,"... "I don’t think it automatically follows that hiring more people will create more efficiency." in response to questioning from Virginia Senator Tim Kaine.

In a smaller market, the hiring freeze came in the middle of the 2017 hiring season for new PhD Economists, removing approximately 10% of the jobs in the US that target people with newly granted PhDs in Economics.

== See also ==
- List of executive actions by Donald Trump
- 2025 United States federal hiring freeze
