= Häfner =

Häfner is a German surname. Notable people with the surname include:

- Georg Häfner (1900–1942), German priest and Nazi victim
- Gerald Häfner (born 1956), German politician
- Ilse Häfner-Mode (1902–1973), German-Jewish artist
- Kai Häfner (born 1989), German handball player
- Ludwig Häfner (1921–1942), German fighter pilot
- Reinhard Häfner (1952–2016), German soccer player
- Thomas Häfner (1928–1985), German painter
- Walter Häfner (born 1944), German pair skater
