= 2025 United States federal hiring freeze =

United States government policy

Hiring Freeze (Memorandum of January 20, 2025)
- Presidential Memorandum Regarding the Hiring Freeze
- Type: Presidential memorandum
- President: Donald Trump
- Signed: January 20, 2025

Federal Register details
- Federal Register document number: 2025-01905
- Publication date: January 28, 2025
- Document citation: 90 FR 8247

The 2025 United States federal hiring freeze is a policy instituted by a presidential memorandum signed by President Donald Trump on January 20, 2025, on the first day of his second administration immediately instituting a hiring freeze on federal employees. The same day as the presidential memorandum, the Office of Personnel Management and Office of Management and Budget issued a joint memorandum, titled "Federal Civilian Hiring Freeze Guidance," detailing to agencies ruled for implementation of the hiring freeze. The policy resembled a similar hiring freeze instituted in 2017, in the early days of the first Trump administration.

On April 17, 2025, Trump extended the hiring freeze for an additional 3 months until July 15, 2025. On July 8, 2025, Trump extended the federal hiring freeze for a second time, this time until October 15, 2025. On October 15, 2025, Trump issued Executive Order 14356, Ensuring Continued Accountability in Federal Hiring, which continued restrictions on filling vacant federal civilian positions and creating new ones, subject to exceptions and agency approval procedures.

== Provisions of the memoranda ==
The main purpose of the presidential memorandum was to institute a temporary hiring freeze for all federal civilian federal employees by prohibiting any new or vacant positions being filled after noon on January 20, 2025. It provides for certain exceptions, such as for military personnel, immigration enforcement, national security, and public safety—as well as allowing for other exemptions to be made by the director of OPM (which were subsequently made, such as for certain internships, fellowships, seasonal workers, and USPS employees). It also directs relevant agencies that Social Security, Medicare and veterans' benefits should not be impacted.

The presidential memorandum declares that the hiring freeze expires, for all agencies besides the Internal Revenue Service, within 90 days, after the required publication of a plan for an overall federal workforce reduction to be issued by director of the OMB. The hiring freeze for the IRS is revocable only by decision of the Secretary of the Treasury. The memorandum does not apply to senior executive positions, as well as presidentially appointed and Senate-confirmed positions. Agencies are prohibited from relying on contracting to circumvent the hiring freeze. The memorandum obligates agencies to follow applicable collective bargaining agreements in carrying out the new policy.

== Background ==
A federal hiring freeze with nearly identical language was an early policy in the first Trump administration, and had been expected to be reinstated. The hiring freeze and other related presidential actions were seen as fulfilling campaign promises. During the 2024 presidential campaign, and after the election, Trump and his spokespeople telegraphed that a federal hiring freeze would be implemented. Shortly after his election victory, Trump announced the formation of the Department of Government Efficiency, which would be tasked with reducing the size and scope of the federal government.

The hiring freeze was issued as part of Donald Trump's "Day One" executive orders and presidential actions, many of which targeted federal employees. Other related presidential actions included federal return-to-office mandate, reinstatement of Schedule F, plans to terminate federal DEI officers, and a buyout offer to all federal employees. There were also efforts to end government programs and spending through executive action, such as the federal grant pause. Administration officials stated that the goal of these policies, especially the return-to-office mandate and buyout offers, is to encourage large amounts of federal employees to leave their positions, and to reduce the overall workforce through "attrition," since the hiring freeze would prevent filling new vacancies. A government-wide email from OPM to all employees on January 30 encouraged federal employees to resign, stating that "The way to greater American prosperity is encouraging people to move from lower productivity jobs in the public sector to higher productivity jobs in the private sector." Taken together, Trump's actions are seen as an effort to reduce and completely reshape the federal workforce.

== Reactions ==
Shortly after the memorandum was issued, the American Federation of Government Employees—the largest labor union of federal employees—strongly opposed the move. AFGE president Everett Kelley described it as part of an effort by Trump to target federal employees, stating "Federal employees are not the problem—they are the solution."

The hiring freeze became an issue in the Secretary of Veteran Affairs confirmation hearing of Doug Collins, with Democrats arguing there would be a downstream effect on veterans' healthcare. Collins acknowledged uncertainty about the scope and applicability of the policy to the VA's workforce. While the presidential memorandum's original phrasing required implementation to have no adverse effect on veterans' benefits, it was applied to medical staff before being exempted. There were still reports of Richmond VA Medical Center rescinding job offers to hospital staff.

In the wake of the crash of American Eagle Flight 5342, occurring days after the introduction of the hiring freeze, the policy was criticized for affecting the hiring of new Federal Aviation Administration air traffic controllers. Democrats on the House Committee on Transportation and Infrastructure condemned the hiring freeze, and also argued it violated the FAA Reauthorization Act of 2024.

It was reported that thousands of law students and graduates had had federal job offers and internship placements rescinded at the Department of Justice and other agencies. Students reported that they had not been given notice before January 20 that their positions were in danger.

== See also ==
- 2017 United States federal hiring freeze
- 2025 United States federal mass layoffs
