= Hafer =

Hafer is a surname. Notable people with the surname include:

- Barbara Hafer (born 1943), U.S politician from the U.S State of Pennsylvania
- Christoph Hafer (born 1992), German bobsledder
- Dick Hafer (1927–2012), American jazz tenor saxophonist born in Wyomissing, Pennsylvania
- Dick Hafer (comics) (1937–2003), American comics artist
- Jack Hafer, film producer
- John J. Hafer (1932–2019) represented District 1 in the Maryland Senate

== See also ==
- Haffner (disambiguation)
- Hafner (disambiguation)
- Schaefer
