= Kara Voorhies =

American businesswoman and accountant (born 1980)

- Born: Kara Lea Schmitz; December 1980 (age 45); United States
- Occupations: Businesswoman and accountant
- Known for: Controversial tenure as contractor to US Federal government 2025-2026
- Spouse: Ryan Voorhies (m. 2008)

Kara Lea Voorhies (née Schmitz; born December 1980) is an American businesswoman and accountant. She became a contractor at the Federal Emergency Management Agency where she was involved in directing several initiatives that were later criticized by a US Senator.

== Early life and education ==
Kara Lea Schmitz was born in December 1980. In December 2008, she married Ryan Voorhies. Voorhies is a licensed certified public accountant in Texas.

== Career ==
=== Crest Investment Company (2014−2025) ===
In 2014, Voorhies began working for Crest Investment Company, a financial firm. She later became its chief financial officer.

=== Federal Emergency Management Agency (2025−2026) ===
In 2025, Voorhies became a contractor at the Federal Emergency Management Agency. She worked with secretary of homeland security Kristi Noem and her acting chief of staff, Corey Lewandowski. At the agency, Voorhies wielded significant authority and operated closely with the Department of Government Efficiency; according to The Washington Post, Voorhies was "Lewandowski's eyes and ears". Lewandowski hired Voorhies and introduced her as a financial advisor. She canceled grants involving climate change and diversity, equity, and inclusion; blocked Muslim organizations from receiving security grants on orders from the Department of Government Efficiency; and sought to prevent California from obtaining relief funding over its status as a sanctuary state. Voorhies established a manual review process for grants and contracts. She was involved in the grant process to construct Alligator Alcatraz and in allocating resources following flooding in central Texas in July. According to the Post, Voorhies questioned assisting search-and-rescue crews after the floods. She was additionally included on emails requesting employee travel amid a federal government shutdown.

In March 2026, NOTUS reported that some Republicans in Congress had expanded their investigation into Noem's tenure at the Department of Homeland Security to include Voorhies's activities. That month, following Noem's removal as secretary of homeland security, her contract at the Federal Emergency Management Agency elapsed. North Carolina senator Thom Tillis publicly named Voorhies in a speech on the Senate floor, accusing the Department of Homeland Security of having "delegated" the responsibilities of the administrator of the Federal Emergency Management Agency to Voorhies. Investigators with the Department of Homeland Security Office of Inspector General searched her office in a separate investigation focusing on her role in the contract process and her compensation, which reportedly reached as much as US$19,000 per week; contractors are legally prohibited from executing "inherently governmental functions". Documents submitted as evidence in AFGE v. Trump, in which Voorhies was accused of directing Karen Evans, the chief of staff of the Federal Emergency Management Agency, affirmed reports of Voorhies's influence at the agency.
