= Hefner =

Hefner or Heffner is a variant of the South German surname "Häfner" meaning 'potter'. It may refer to:

- Hefner (band), British rock band

== People with the surname ==
- Art Hefner (1913–1988), American center fielder
- Avraham Heffner (1935–2014), Israeli filmmaker
- Berniece Heffner (1897/1898–1989), American labor unionist
- Bill Hefner (1930–2009), U.S. Representative from North Carolina
- Bob Heffner (1938–2025), Major League Baseball pitcher
- Bryon Hefner, estranged husband of Stan Rosenberg, subject of a sexual harassment scandal
- Christie Hefner (born 1952), former chairman of Playboy Enterprises, daughter of Hugh Hefner
- Cole Hefner (born 1980), American politician
- Cooper Hefner (born 1991), American businessman, son of Hugh Hefner
- Crystal Hefner (born 1986), third wife of Hugh Hefner
- Don Heffner (1911–1989), American second-baseman
- Ellyn Hefner, American politician from Oklahoma
- Elroy Hefner (1923–2020), American politician from Nebraska
- George E. Heffner (1923–2008), American politician from Maryland
- Hugh Hefner (1926–2017), founder of Playboy magazine
- J. R. Heffner (born 1972), NASCAR driver
- James A. Hefner (1941–2015), president of Tennessee State University
- Jeremy Hefner (born 1986), MLB pitcher for the New York Mets
- Jerry Hefner (1949–2017), American politician from Oklahoma
- Keith Hefner, founder and executive director of Youth Communication, a nonprofit organization
- Kyle T. Heffner (born 1957), American actor
- Larry Hefner (born 1949), American linebacker
- Lulu M. Hefner (1874–1954), Cherokee businesswoman
- Philip Hefner (1932–2024), American theologian, Lutheran professor of the theology of evolution
- Ray Heffner (1925–2012), president of Brown University
- Richard Heffner (1925–2013), TV talk show host, and professor at Rutgers Institute
- Robert A. Hefner (1874–1971), Oilman, Oklahoma Hall of Fame 1949, OK Supreme Court Justice and Mayor of Oklahoma City
- Rodrigo Heffner (born 1982), Brazilian footballer

== See also ==
- Hafner (disambiguation)
- Haffner (disambiguation)
- Höffner (disambiguation)
