= Johann Baptist Reiter =

Austrian painter (1813–1890)

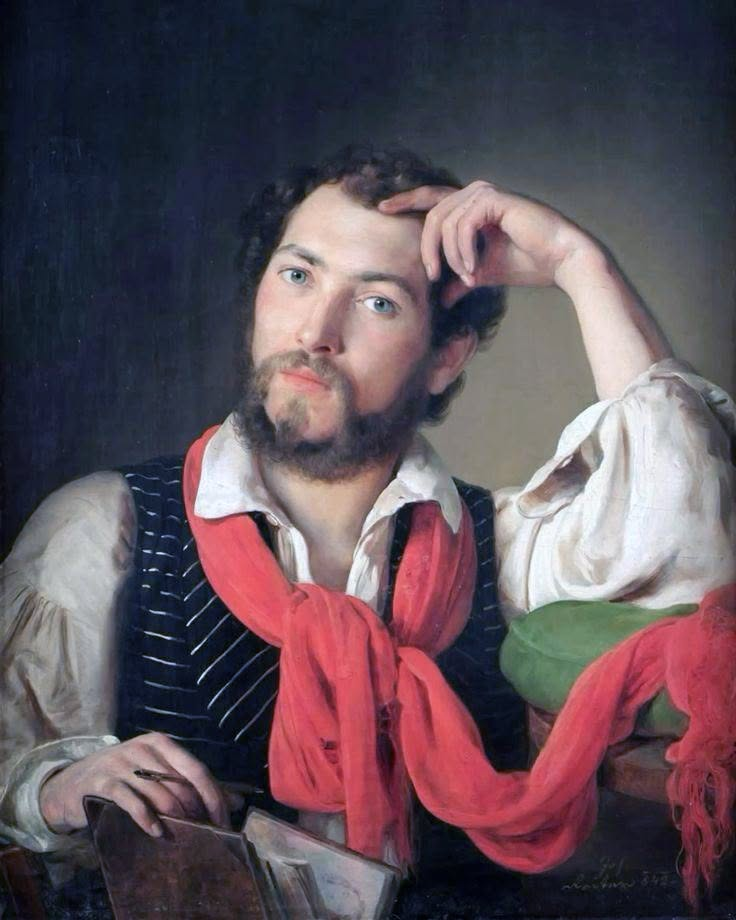
Self-portrait (1842)

Johann Baptist Reiter (28 May 1813 in Linz – 10 January 1890 in Vienna) was an Austrian portrait and genre painter of the Biedermeier period.

== Biography ==
His father was a master carpenter. He spent three years as an apprentice at his father's company, painting furniture, signs and crosses. Encouraged by the lithographer and art dealer, Josef Hafner, he enrolled at the Academy of Fine Arts, Vienna. His teachers there included Leopold Kupelwieser and Thomas Ender. After 1830, he largely earned his living as a porcelain painter.

Probably as the result of a recommendation by Kupelweiser, he was awarded a scholarship by the Upper Austrian Landstand that enabled him to continue his studies from 1834 to 1837. During this time, he also exhibited and won the Lampi-Preis for model drawing in 1836. He was married in 1839. Originally, he did genre and historical scenes, but he decided to switch to portraits and soon became so popular that he was able to purchase a large house in Vienna with a four-horse carriage and a Moor as a servant.

During the Revolution of 1848 he sided with the revolutionaries. Possibly due to the trouble this caused, his wife left him in 1850. From then until 1870, he was a regular participant at the exhibitions of numerous Austrian art societies.

It is unclear if he was divorced or his first wife died, but he was remarried in 1866. His new wife's extravagance eventually forced him to take more orders than he could handle, as well as turn to making copies of the Old Masters. She died in 1889, and he died the following year. He was interred at the Zentralfriedhof.

In 2013, a major retrospective was jointly hosted by the Schlossmuseum Linz and the Nordico Stadtmuseum. It included over 170 works gathered from museums in Vienna and Budapest and private collections.

== Gallery ==
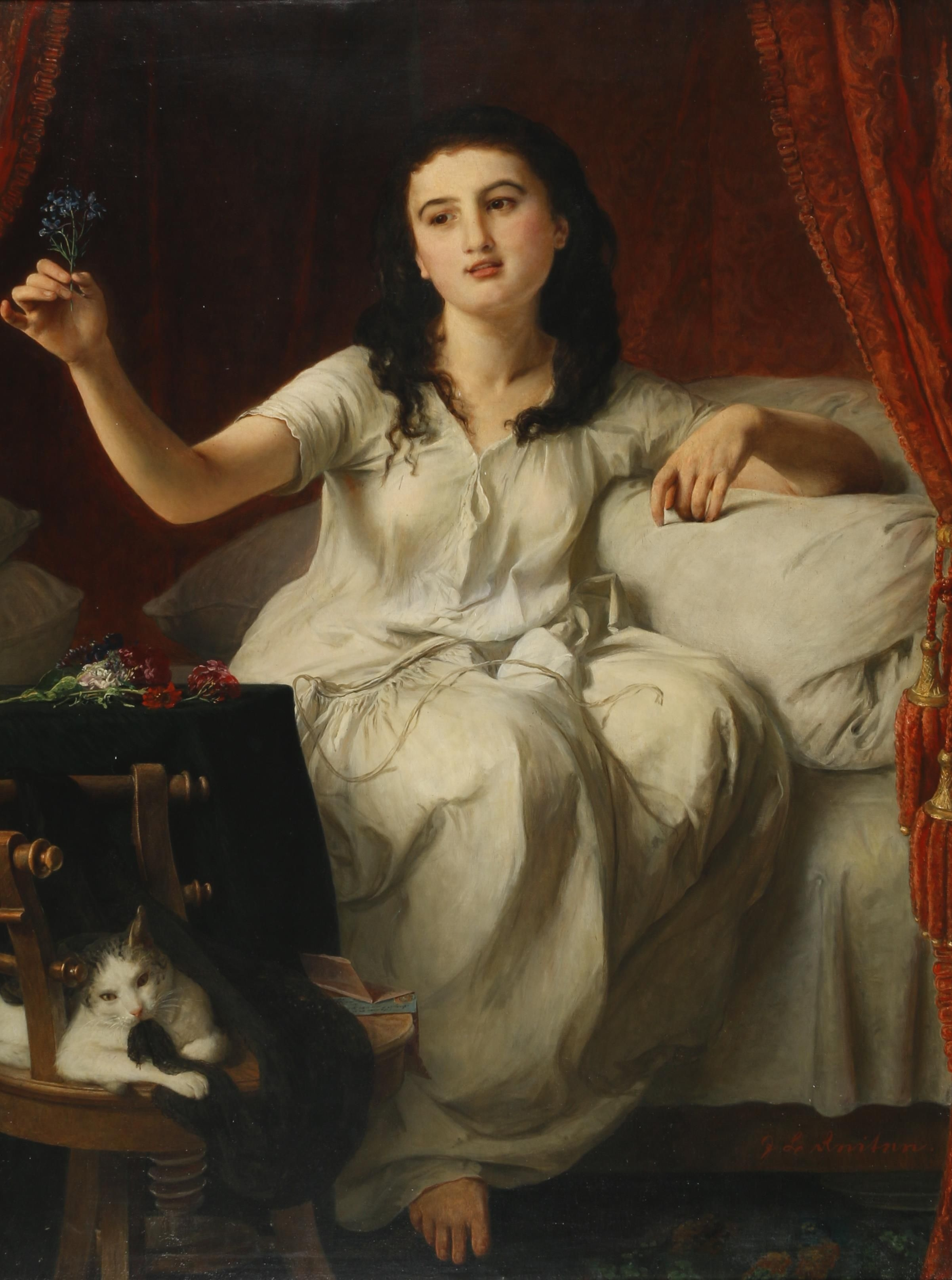
Floral Greeting in the Morning

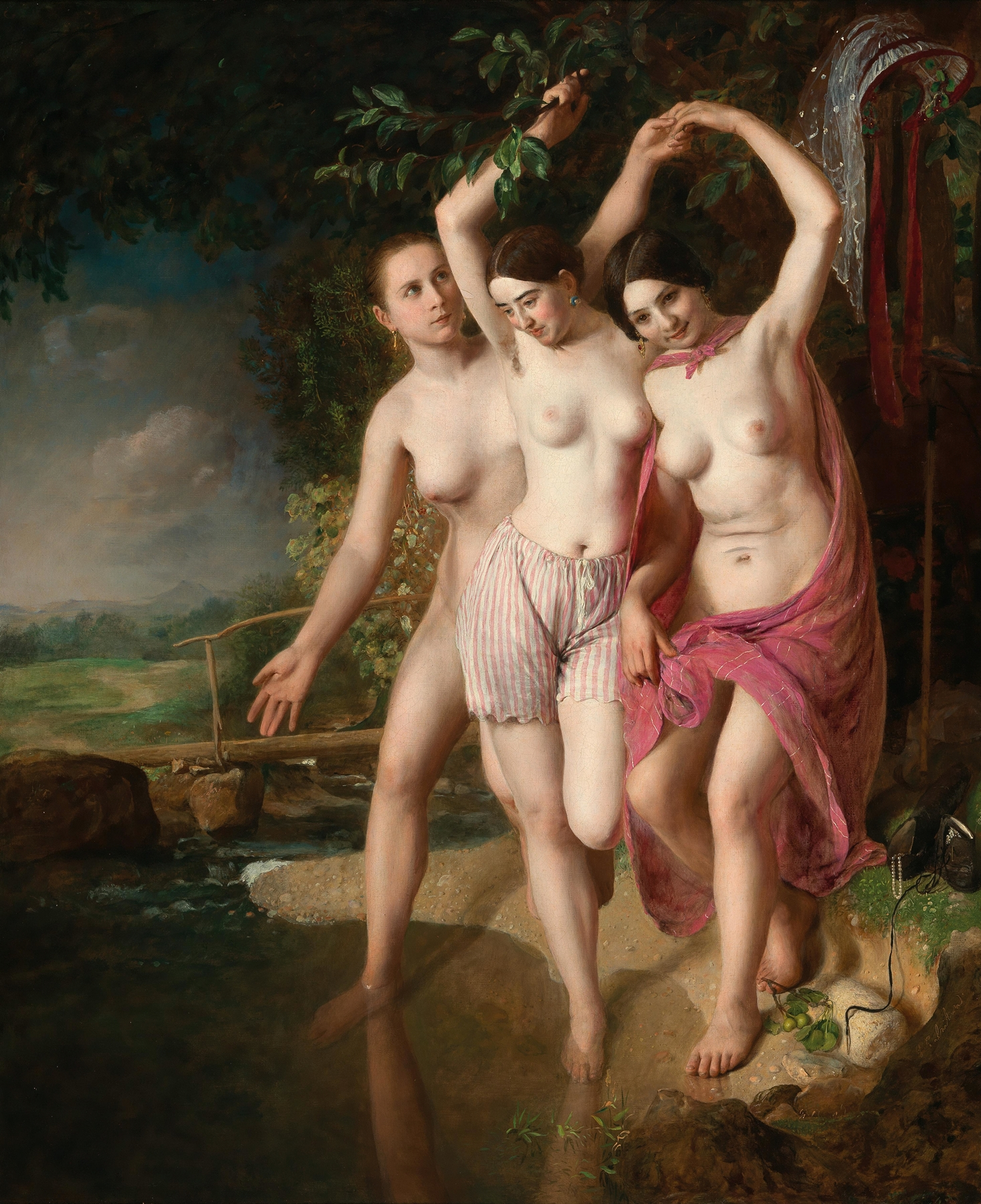
Three Bathers

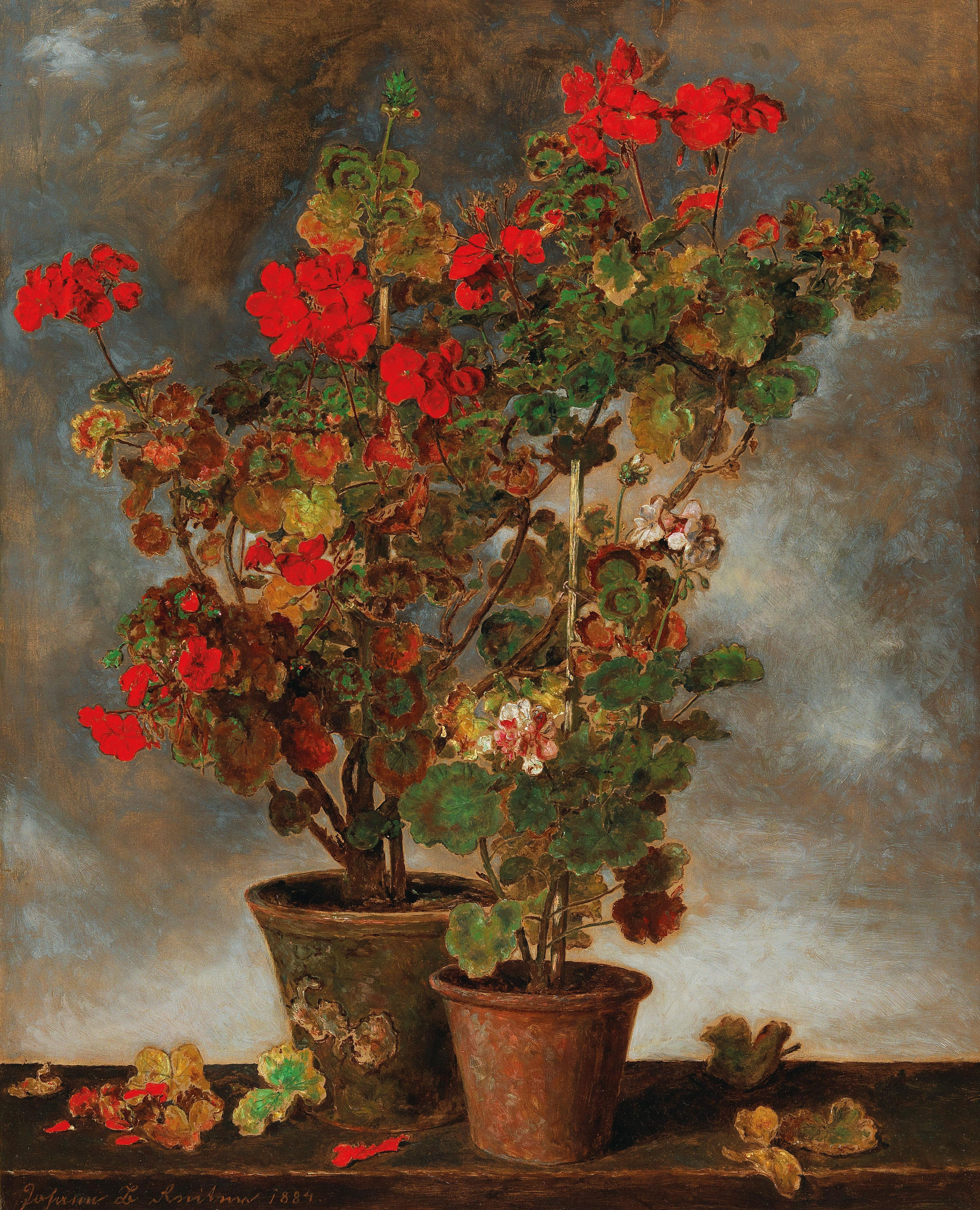
Geraniums

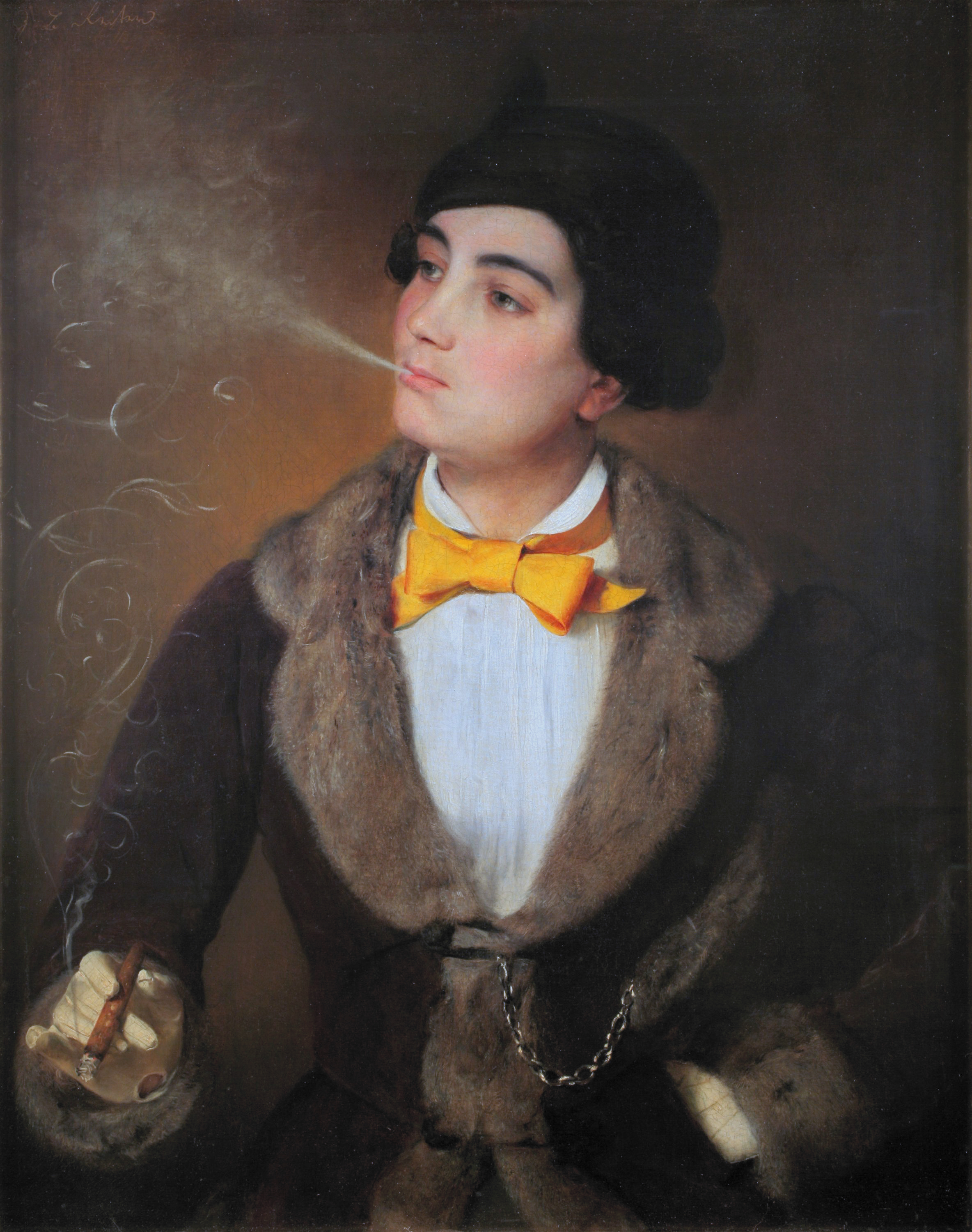
Luise Aston

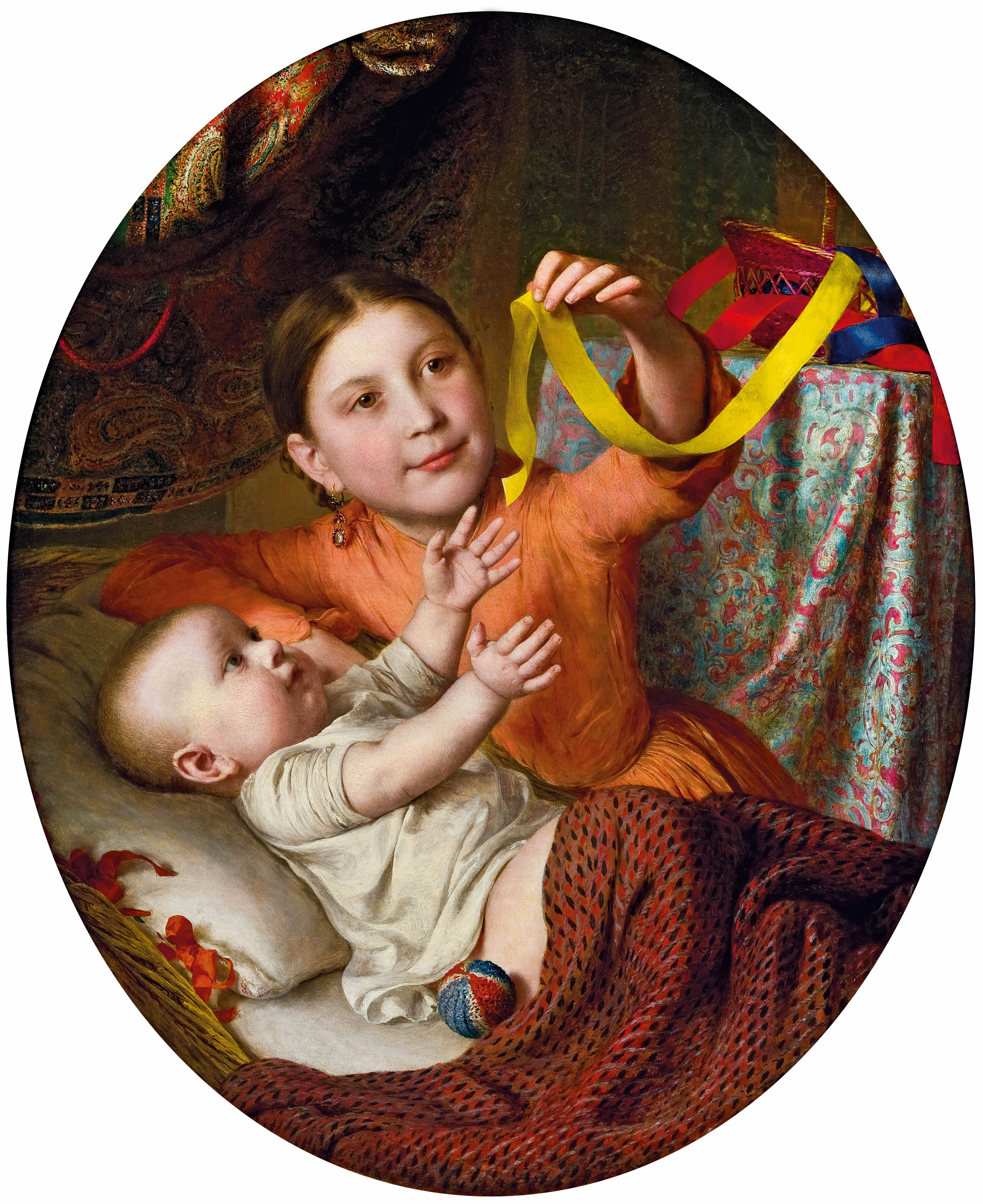
Two children playing with silk ribbons

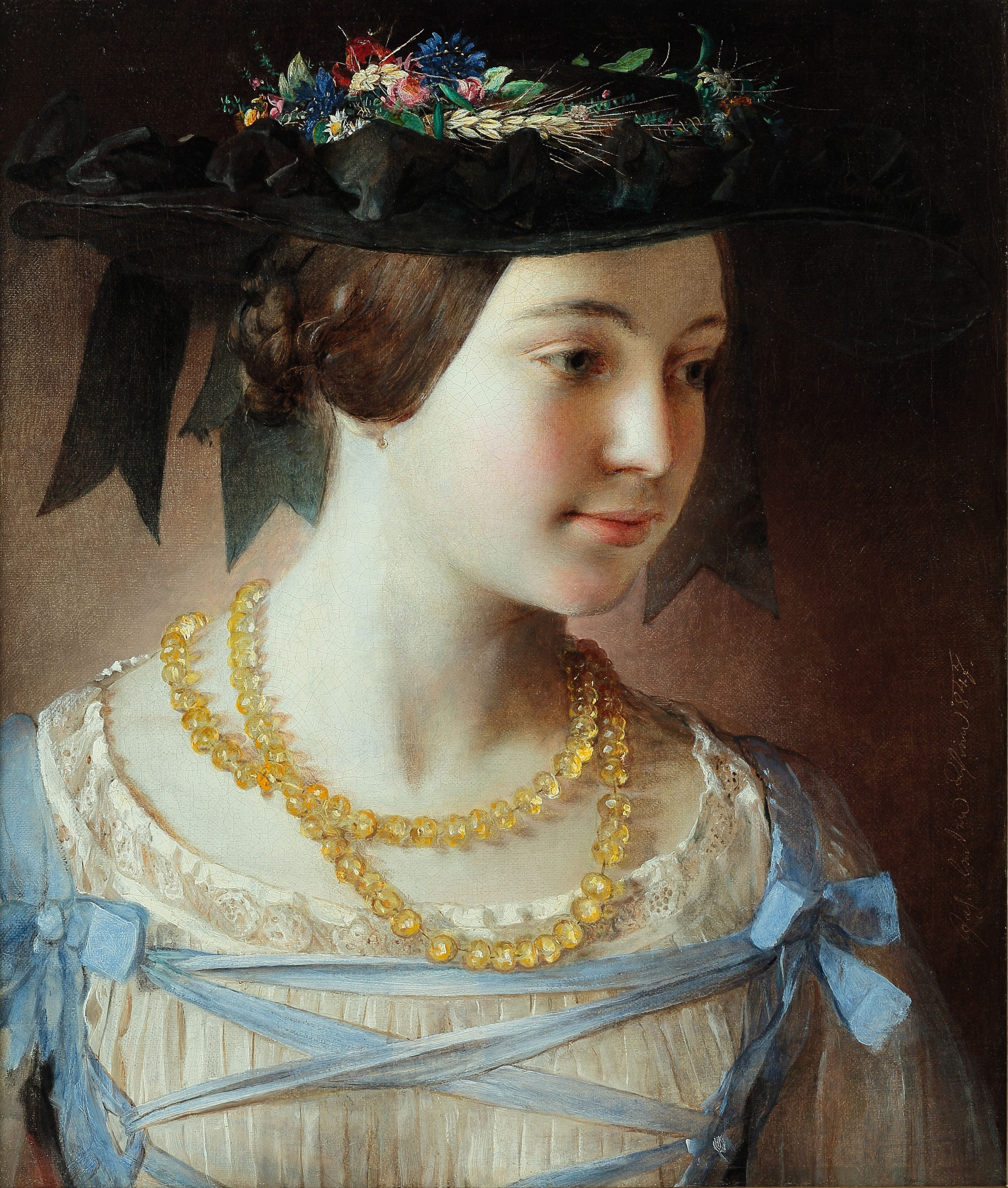
Girl with an amber necklace

== References/Sources ==
- G. Wacha: "Reiter Johann Bapt.". In: Österreichisches Biographisches Lexikon 1815–1950 (ÖBL). Vol. 9, Austrian Academy of Sciences, Vienna 1988, ISBN 3-7001-1483-4, p. 64.
- Alice Strobl: Johann Baptist Reiter, A. Scholl, 1963
- Lothar Schultes: Bilder des Lebens. Johann Baptist Reiter und der Realismus des 19. Jahrhunderts, (exhibition catalogue) Museum Francisco-Carolinum, 1990
- Lothar Schultes: Johann Baptist Reiter. A. Pustet, 2013 ISBN 978-3-7025-0718-3
