= McClennan =

McClennan is a surname. Notable people with the surname include:

- Alonzo Clifton McClennan (1855–1912), American physician
- Brian McClennan (born 1962), New Zealand rugby league player and coach
- Darren McClennan (born 1965), New Zealand soccer player
- Howie McClennan (1907–2002), American labor union leader
- Mike McClennan (1944–2019), New Zealand rugby league player and coach
- Tommy McClennan (1908–1962), American blues singer and guitarist
