= Haffner =

Haffner is a surname. Notable people with include:

- Antonio Maria Haffner (1654–1732), Italian painter of quadratura and priest
- Chris Haffner, member of Swiss pop-rock duo Myron
- Claude Haffner (born 1976), French-Congolese filmmaker
- Eduard Haffner (1804–1889), Baltic German educationist, rector of Tartu University
- Enrico Haffner (1640–1702), Baroque painter of quadratura active mainly in Bologna, Italy
- Ernst Haffner, German social worker, journalist, and novelist
- Harry Haffner (1900–1969), German lawyer and Judge-President of the Nazi People's Court
- Holger Häffner, German canoeist
- Jean Georg Haffner (1777–1830), founded the spa at Sopot, Poland
- Jon Haffner (born 1940), Norwegian surgeon and professor
- Karl Haffner (1804–1876), German dramaturge
- Mike Haffner (American football) (1942–2024), American football player
- Mike Haffner, American politician and businessman
- Paul Leopold Haffner (1829–1899), German Roman Catholic bishop
- Pierre Haffner (1943–2000), French film critic
- Sarah Haffner (1940–2018), German-British painter, author, and feminist activist
- Scott Haffner (born 1966), American basketball player
- Sebastian Haffner (1907–1999), German journalist and historian
- Victor Adetunji Haffner (1919–2015), Nigerian communications engineer
- Wolfgang Haffner (born 1965), German jazz drummer
- Wolfgang von Haffner (1810–1887), Danish military officer and politician
- Wolfgang Wenzel von Haffner (1806–1892), Norwegian naval officer and politician
- Yehuda Haffner (1928–2015), Israeli prime ministerial advisor, diplomat, and author

== See also ==
- Haffner (disambiguation)
