= John Gage (unionist) =

American labor leader (born 1946)

John W. Gage (born 1946) is a retired American labor union leader.

Born in Pittsburgh, Gage attended Central Catholic High School, then studied at Wheeling Jesuit University. In 1968, he became a professional baseball player, a catcher with the Baltimore Orioles, having been drafted in the 5th round, but did not play in a major league game, and was released at the end of the season.

In 1974, Gage became a disability examiner for the Social Security Administration (SSA), and joined the American Federation of Government Employees (AFGE). He became president of his union local in 1982, and a national vice president, in which role he instituted the "lunch and learns" organizing program. He stood down as national vice president in 1985, to focus on organizing SSA employees, against an attempt by another union to represent them.

Gage was elected as national president of AFGE in 2003, also becoming a vice-president of the AFL-CIO. As leader of the union, he focused on organizing new members, and arranging agreements with employers, the last one being with the Transportation Security Administration. He retired in 2012.

Trade union offices
Preceded by Bobby Harnage	President of the American Federation of Government Employees; 2003–2012	Succeeded by Jeffrey David Cox
