= John Sturdivant (unionist) =

American labor union leader (1938–1997)

John Nathan Sturdivant (1938 – October 28, 1997) was an American labor union leader.

Born in Philadelphia, Sturdivant grew up in Bridgeport, Connecticut. He studied at Antioch University and then George Washington University, where he graduated in law. He served in the US Air Force before, in 1961 becoming an electronics technician for the Army Interagency Communications Agency. He joined the American Federation of Government Employees (AFGE), and presided over its local in Winchester, Virginia for eight years.

Sturdivant began working full-time for the union as organizing director, based in Washington DC. In 1982, he became executive vice president of the union. In 1988, he defeated Kenneth T. Blaylock, the incumbent president, and became the leader of the union, which was facing bankruptcy. With his election, the AFGE became the largest union in the US to have been led by an African American.

As the leader of the union, Sturdivant cut costs sharply and enforced payment of dues more strongly, resolving the AFGE's financial issues. He campaigned to bring pay for government workers in line with their private sector equivalents, and helped amend the Hatch Act to permit off-duty government workers to engage in some political activities. He also publicized the problems arising from government shutdowns, when Congress failed to agree a budget. He campaigned against government work being outsourced to the private sector, but also opened union membership to some outsourced workers.

Sturdivant served on the National Partnership Council, but attracted criticism for asking union staff to put together a list of government employees who opposed government labor policy.

Sturdivant was diagnosed with leukemia in December 1996, and died of the cancer in October 1997, while still in office.

Trade union offices
Preceded by Ken Blaylock	President of the American Federation of Government Employees; 1988–1997	Succeeded by Bobby Harnage
