= First 100 days of the Trump presidency =

First 100 days of the Trump presidency may refer to:

- First 100 days of the first Trump presidency, 2017
- First 100 days of the second Trump presidency, 2025
