= Barbara Hutchinson =

American lawyer (born 1946)

- Born: November 23, 1946 (age 79); Braddock, Pennsylvania, U.S.
- Education: University of Pittsburgh; Dickinson School of Law

Barbara Bethune Hutchinson (born November 23, 1946) is an American lawyer and former labor union leader.

== Biography ==
Born in Braddock, Pennsylvania, Hutchinson studied at the University of Pittsburgh, and then at the Dickinson School of Law. She was admitted to the bar in both Pennsylvania and the District of Columbia. In 1977, she began working for the Equal Employment Opportunity Commission in Atlanta.

Hutchinson joined the American Federation of Government Employees, and in 1980 she ran for director of the union's women's department. Having decided to run only days before the election, she did not expect to be competitive, and left the union's congress before the results were announced. She won an unexpected victory, and stated that she would focus on increasing her budget, recruiting more women into the union, developing a handbook to inform women of their rights, and assisting women in finding more senior positions.

In 1981, black leaders of unions affiliated with the AFL-CIO proposed a shortlist of five potential candidates for the federation's vice presidential posts. The federation's leadership did not appoint any of the five, but instead unexpectedly appointed Hutchinson, who became the youngest ever member, and only the second African American, to sit on the federation's executive council.

Hutchinson resigned from her union post in 1988, to contest the union's secretary-treasurer position, but was heavily defeated by Allen Kaplan.
