= Jeffrey David Cox =

American labor union leader

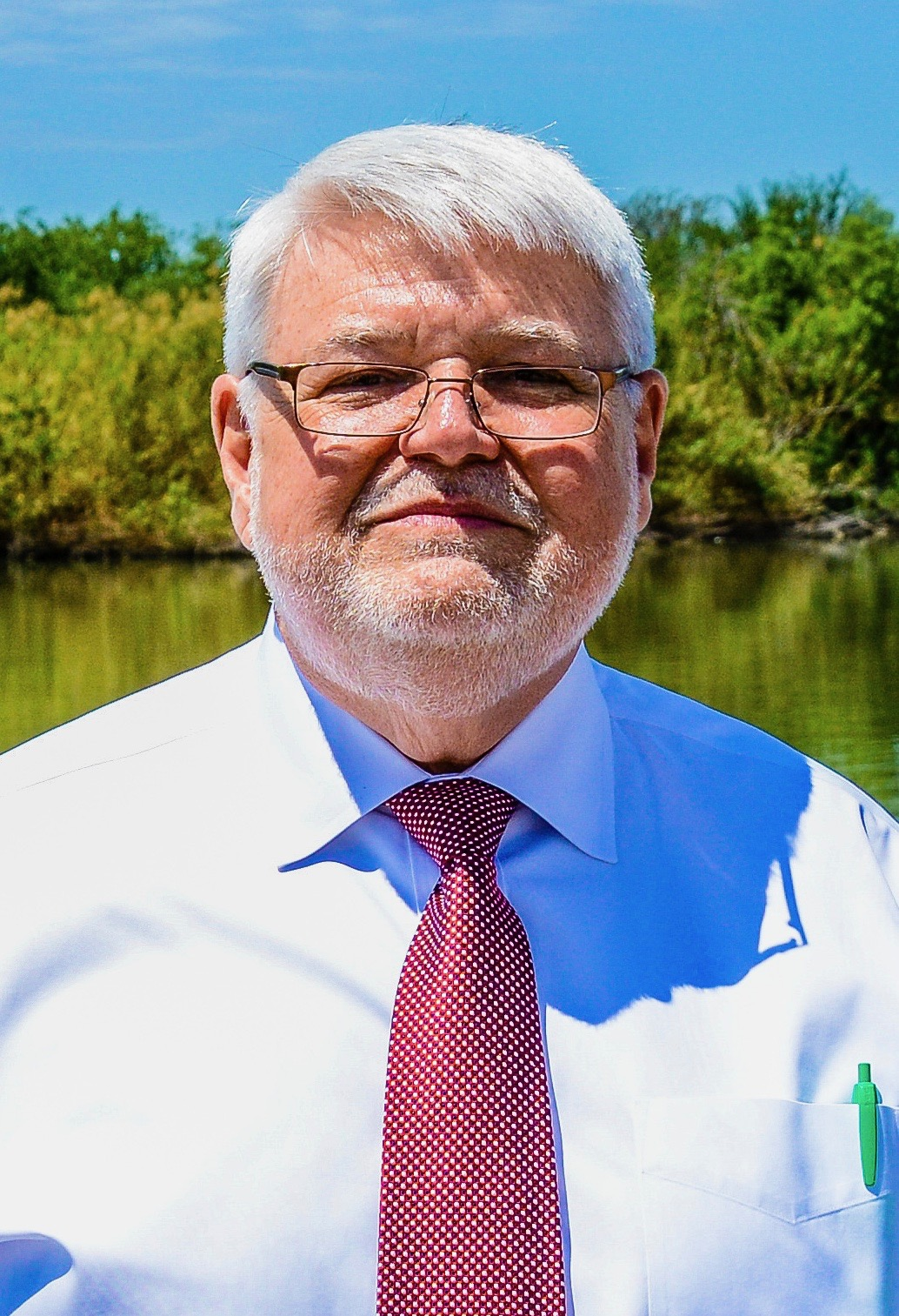
- Cox in 2014
- Born: 1951 (age 74–75)
- Education: Gardner–Webb University
- Occupation: Former President of AFGE

Jeffrey David Cox (born March 9, 1951) is the former National President of the American Federation of Government Employees (AFGE), AFL-CIO who resigned in February 2020, amid allegations of misusing union funds and sexual harassment.

== Summary ==
Jeffrey David Cox Sr. was elected National President at American Federation of Government Employees' 39th National Convention in Las Vegas in 2012. He was elected to a second term at the 40th National AFGE Convention in 2015. On February 28, 2020, Cox resigned his office effective at the close of business.

Cox had been on a leave of absence since Oct. 27, after current and former employees alleged he had sexually harassed them. One former communications director said that on a business trip in April 2017, Cox had stuck his tongue in his ear and told him he loved him. Another former assistant said that Cox told him he should be more open to sex with men.

== Early career ==
Cox began his career in healthcare in 1970. In 1983, Cox became a registered nurse and started a public-sector career with the Department of Veterans Affairs that lasted until September 2006 when he became AFGE secretary-treasurer Cox served two consecutive terms as AFGE's National Secretary-Treasurer, elected first in August 2006 and reelected by acclamation in August 2009.

Cox was appointed by President Barack Obama to serve on the Federal Salary Council and the Federal Prevailing Wage Council. He was a member of the AFL-CIO Executive Council and from 1993-2020 was Vice President of the North Carolina State AFL-CIO. Cox was unanimously elected chairman of the executive committee of the Department for Professional Employees (DPE), AFL-CIO. He also chaired the AFL-CIO's Union Veterans Council, which seeks to help veterans with employment opportunities through the VA and in the building trades.

== Personal life ==
Cox was born in 1951. He attended A.L. Brown High School in Kannapolis, North Carolina until 1969, before receiving his nursing degree at Gardner–Webb University.

Cox is a member of the United Methodist church. He grew up in a “very anti-union” community before moving to downtown Silver Spring.

Cox married his high school sweetheart Georgia Cox, on May 24, 1980. In October 2019, he was accused of sexual harassment by ten individuals, most of whom were male. Cox's former secretary Rocky Kabir said Cox urged him to shower with him, among other claims.

== Awards ==
In 2012, Cox won the Yitzhak Rabin Public Service Award from the American Friends of the Yitzhak Rabin Center. In 2013, Cox was honored with the AFL-CIO's At the River I Stand award, which is given annually to a national leader who has demonstrated an unyielding commitment to civil rights and workers’ rights. That year he was also honored by the Rev. Jesse Jackson with the Martin Luther King Labor Leader award. In 2014 he received the National Action Network Labor Award from the Rev. Al Sharpton and the Peggy Browning Award for Social Justice Advocacy from the Peggy Browning Foundation

Trade union offices
Preceded by Jim Davis	Secretary-Treasurer of the American Federation of Government Employees; 2006–2012	Succeeded by Eugene Hudson
Preceded by John Gage	President of the American Federation of Government Employees; 2012–2020	Succeeded by Everett Kelley
