= Public Employee Department =

The Public Employee Department was a division of the American Federation of Labor and Congress of Industrial Organizations (AFL-CIO), bringing together American unions representing government workers.

== History ==
The Government Employees' Council of the American Federation of Labor (AFL) was founded in 1945. When the AFL merged into the AFL-CIO, the council was maintained, and by 1963 it had more than 20 union affiliates. In 1974, a new Public Employee Department was founded, absorbing the council. On formation, it had 24 affiliated unions, representing more than 2 million public employees.

By the 1990s, the department's focus was on developing a framework for labour and management co-operation. It was dissolved in 1998.

== Presidents ==
1974: Howie McClennan
1981: Ken Blaylock
1985: Gerald McEntee
1988: Al Bilik
