= Bobby L. Harnage =

American labor leader (1939–2025)

- Born: October 2, 1939; Lakeland, Florida
- Died: July 14, 2025
- Education: Macon College and the University of Georgia
- Occupation: President of AFGE
- Years active: 1997-2003

Bobby Lamar Harnage (October 2, 1939 – July 14, 2025) was an American labor union leader.

== Life and career ==
Harnage was born in Lakeland, Florida, and grew up in Moultrie, Georgia. He attended Macon College and the University of Georgia. He served in the United States Air Force from 1959, then from 1963 was a civilian employee at Robins Air Force Base. He joined the American Federation of Government Employees, and in 1968 began working full-time for the union. He served as a district national representative, then as a vice-president.

In 1991, Harnage was elected as secretary-treasurer of the union, then in 1997 as president. The following year he was also elected as a vice-president of the AFL-CIO. As leader of the union, he increased membership, began using the internet to co-ordinate activities, and led an advertising campaign for recruitment. In 2003, he was narrowly defeated for re-election by John Gage, and he stood down from his AFL-CIO post the following year.

Harnage died at his home in Moultrie on July 14, 2025, at the age of 85.

Trade union offices
Preceded by Allen H. Kaplan	Secretary-Treasurer of the American Federation of Government Employees; 1991–1997	Succeeded by Rita Mason
Preceded by John Sturdivant	President of the American Federation of Government Employees; 1997–2003	Succeeded by John Gage
