= Ilse Häfner-Mode =

German painter

- Born: Ilse Mode; 24 December 1902; Kempen, Posen, Prussia, Germany
- Died: 15 March 1973 (aged 70); Düsseldorf, North Rhine-Westphalia, West Germany
- Occupations: Artist; Concentration camp survivor
- Spouse: Herbert Häfner
- Children: Thomas Häfner

Ilse Häfner-Mode (24 December 1902 - 15 March 1973) was a German-Jewish artist of what German commentators sometimes term the "lost (or forgotten) generation" ("Verschollene Generation"). Most of her work, which consists both of oil paintings and of watercolours, latterly sometimes enhanced through the artist's own embroidery using silk thread, is held in private collections. The organisers of an exhibition devoted to her work in 2013 were nevertheless able to get hold of approximately 100 of her paintings, on loan, from around 30 collectors.

On account of her Jewish provenance she and her family were subjected to increasing levels of persecution after 1933. She was nevertheless still living in Nazi Germany when the Second World War broke out in 1939, after which it was no longer possible to emigrate. She lived in Germany throughout the Holocaust years and survived. Häfner-Mode later boasted that the National Socialists had prevented her from exhibiting or selling her art: but they never succeeded in preventing her from painting.

Her son Thomas, who later also became an artist, was, according to one source, "given to a merchant who was travelling to India". The reality was a little less stark. Between 1938 and 1948 Thomas Häfner grew up in Ceylon while benefitting from education at a school for British children. He thereby survived the holocaust, albeit badly traumatised through the circumstances of his separation from his mother.

== Life ==
Ilse Mode was born in Kempen (as Kępno was known before 1920), a small market town and administrative centre which at the time of her birth was part of the Prussian Province of Posen. Her father worked as a pharmacist. Some months before her second birthday the family relocated to Berlin, then a rapidly expanding boom city. She lived in Berlin between 1904 and 1943.

In 1919, directly after leaving school, Häfner-Mode enrolled at a study workshop for painting and sculpture. A year later she moved on to the Berlin University of the Arts where she studied till 1925, and was taught by Erich Wolfsfeld. One of her fellow students was the artist, Herbert Häfner (1904-1954), whom in 1927 she married. The couple's son, Thomas Häfner (1928-1985), was born on Christmas Eve, 1928.

After leaving Art College she lived in Berlin as a free-lance artist. She produced portraits and other compositions rich in figures, both in oils and as watercolours. She also specialised in "needle paintings". In 1928 the critic-collector Paul Westheim reviewed a "mother and child" painting by Häfner-Mode in Das Kunstblatt: "... in ethos, in composition and in artistic theology, she removes any social empathy". (Note: "...das kommt von der Modersohn her, kompositorisch, auch im Ethos, auch in der Phrasenlosigkeit des sozialen Mitempfindens".) Her central theme was always people. The collector-connoisseur Ditmar Schmetz wrote that "she loved people: that tied in with her deep capacity for love. That is reflected not just in her life, but in her pictures. (Note: "Sie liebte Menschen, das hing mit ihrer tiefen Liebesfähigkeit zusammen. Diese spiegelt sich auch in ihren Bildern".) It was in the 1980s that the influential art historian Rainer Zimmermann classified her work in terms of the "expressive realism" of the "lost generation".

In 1933 the Nuremberg Laws enforced the Nazi boycott of Jewish businesses and her work was banned from exhibitions. The ban lasted throughout the twelve years of the Nazi regime. Under the racial policy of the government she was also excluded from the Association of Berlin women artists. Häfner-Mode at this stage resolutely refused to recognise what was happening to Germany and continued to paint in secret. Five years later her son was taken by her brother, Heinz Mode, to Basel, Switzerland, (where he had contacts, having studied at the university). The child was then handed over to Heinz Mode's friend, Prof. Dr. Lydowik, who took him to Marseille where the two of them boarded a French liner for the passage to Ceylon. When Häfner-Mode and her son were parted she promised him that she would arrange for Swiss friends in the art world to sell her paintings at a good price, and that she would be able to use the proceeds to join him in Ceylon. The first part of the exercise went according to plan, but by the time the necessary travel documents arrived the borders had been closed. Her last minute efforts to get out of Germany and be reunited with her child before the worst of the Hitler years unfolded had not succeeded.

During 1942 or 1943 (sources differ), as the tide of the European war turned decisively against the German army, the extent and savagery of persecution suffered by those who had been identified as Jewish, and who were still living in Germany, intensified. Häfner-Mode left Berlin and went to live with the family of her brother-in-law in the Leopoldshöhe countryside east of Bielefeld. There was an assumption that here, in the seemingly remote countryside, she would be safe. Contemporaries interviewed later recalled her as a friendly and likeable woman. She was able to obtain boards and other artists' materials from the village carpenter, and made a modest living through painting portraits of the wealthier inhabitants of the Lippe region in which she had ended up. In September 1944 officers from the Gestapo in Minden appeared and arrested her. Her presence had been reported to the authorities by a villager.

Häfner-Mode was transferred briefly to the Buchenwald concentration camp, and from there to the Elben labour camp, run under the auspices of Organisation Todt in the hills west of Kassel. The camp accommodated around 200 women identified by the government as "jüdische Mischlinge ersten Grades" - having one Jewish parent and one non-Jewish parent - or having ended up in other racially determined target categories. It had been set up to provide workers for an underground aircraft factory under construction at the adjacent village of Hardtkopf. Sources are, in most respects, silent about her work, which initially involved constructing huts for camp accommodation and then transferred the vast underground construction site, but it is known that Häfner-Mode was able to continue with her art in the camp, producing numerous pen and ink drawings. When the camp was liberated by American troops advancing from the west on 31 March or 1 April 1945 she was still alive.

By that time Häfner-Mode was badly weakened, both physically and spiritually. From something she wrote at that time, it appears that she did not expect to live for much longer, but nevertheless did not feel ready for death. (Note: "Lass mich, lieber Gott noch ein bisschen auf der Erde leben, der ich so viel Gutes abzugewinnen weiß.") Directly following the war she travelled to Switzerland and was able to undertake a lengthy period of recuperation while staying with friends.

At least one commentator expresses incredulity that Häfner-Mode then wished to return to Germany after her experiences in her homeland, but return she did. She moved back to the Leopoldshöhe countryside where she had briefly found refuge during the Hitler years. The entire north-west of Germany had been placed under British military occupation since May 1945, becoming part of the new Federal German Republic in May 1949. On a personal level, there was much unfinished business. The marriage to Herbert Häfner formally ended in divorce on 13 September 1946. Protracted arguments about compensation were only settled after a lawsuit and "diverse interventions". In the end she was awarded 6,000 Deutsche Mark in damages "for a twelve year ban on painting and on professional activity, and for eight months of detention in a camp". She remained in Leopoldshöhe, this time, for nearly ten years, during what became a happy and productive period of painting and recuperation in the little village where the family of her former husband's brother and other relatives still lived.

Meanwhile, in 1948 her son had returned from Ceylon. He successfully passed the admission exam for the prestigious Kunstakademie art academy in Düsseldorf. On completion of his studies he remained in Düsseldorf and built a successful career as a painter, while keeping in close contact with each of his parents. In 1954 his father died and Ilse Häfner-Mode relocated from the Lippe Uplands to Düsseldorf, where mother and son now lived together. She continued to pursue her career as an artist, and her work featured significantly in a number of important exhibitions, notably in the Stadtgeschichtliches Museum in 1969 and the city's Kunsthalle exhibition hall in 1972.

Ilse Häfner-Mode died at Düsseldorf on 15 March 1973.
