= Höffner =

Höffner, Hoffner or Hoeffner may refer to:

- Joseph Höffner (1906–1987), a German cardinal of the Roman Catholic Church
- Höffner (furniture retailer) in Germany
- Carleton Hoffner Jr. (1931–2020), American figure skater
- Charles Hoffner (1896–1981), American professional golfer
- Harry A. Hoffner (1934–2015), American professor of Hittitology
- Hoffner Historic District, Cincinnati, Ohio, U.S.
- Kyra Hoffner, American politician from Delaware
- Lou (German singer) (Louise Hoffner, born 1963)

== See also ==
- Höfner, German manufacturer of musical instruments
- Hefner (disambiguation)
