= Clyde M. Webber =

Clyde Mayo Webber (December 9, 1919 – June 15, 1976) was an American labor union leader.

Born in Siloam Springs, Arkansas, Webber was brought up in Green River, Wyoming and Ogden, Utah. He worked for the United States Department of Labor, and in 1949, he joined the American Federation of Government Employees (AFGE). In 1960, he became a vice-president of the union, representing five western states. He was elected as the full-time executive vice-president of the AFGE in 1966, and moved to Washington, D.C.

In 1972, Webber was elected as president of the AFGE. In 1975, he was additionally elected as a vice-president of the AFL-CIO. He died of cancer in 1976, while still in office.

Trade union offices
Preceded by John F. Griner	President of the American Federation of Government Employees; 1972–1976	Succeeded by Ken Blaylock
