= Lee Saunders =

American union leader

President of AFSCME
- In office 2012–2026
- Preceded by: Gerald W. McEntee
- Succeeded by: Patrick Moran

Secretary-Treasurer of AFSCME
- In office 2010–2012

Personal details
- Born: 1951 (age 74–75) Cleveland, Ohio, U.S.
- Spouse: Lynne Saunders
- Children: 2
- Education: Ohio University(BA); Ohio State University; (MA)

Lee A. Saunders is a labor movement leader in the United States. From June 2012 until September 2026, he served as president of the 1.6 million-member American Federation of State, County and Municipal Employees (AFSCME), one of the largest and most politically active unions in the AFL-CIO. Saunders was previously the union's secretary-treasurer from 2010 to 2012.

== Life and career ==
The son of a city bus driver, Saunders grew up in a union household in Cleveland, Ohio. He joined the Ohio Civil Service Employees Association (OCSEA) in 1974 while working for the Ohio Bureau of Employment Services. In 1978, he began working for AFSCME as a labor economist, subsequently holding positions related to the union's collective bargaining, community action and organizing services. He served as administrator of a number of AFSCME councils across the country, including District Council 37, New York's largest public employee union, representing 125,000 members.

Saunders was a vice president of the AFL-CIO Executive Council and chair of the labor federation's Political Committee. He is an at-large member of the Democratic Party's National Committee, treasurer of the Leadership Conference on Civil and Human Rights and president of Working America.

In 2002, he was awarded an honorary doctorate in Humane Letters by the College of New Rochelle.

Trade union offices
Preceded by Gerald W. McEntee	President of the AFSCME; 2012 - 2026	Succeeded by Patrick Moran
