= Ken Blaylock =

American labor union leader (1935–2018)

Kenneth T. Blaylock (July 15, 1935 – October 10, 2018) was an American labor union leader.

Born in North Carolina to a family with Cherokee origins, Blaylock became a plumber in Alabama. He served on the Maxwell Air Force Base, and became active in the American Federation of Government Employees (AFGE), serving as vice-president for the union's southern region, and then from 1976 as president. He was also elected as a vice-president of the AFL-CIO in 1977, and in 1981 as president of the federation's Public Employee Department.

As leader of the AFGE, Blaylock was a strong supporter of the controversial Civil Service Reform Act of 1978. Under his leadership, membership of the union fell as government employment contracted, and the union's finances suffered as members rejected Blaylock's proposals to consolidate districts and raise membership fees. He became known as an opponent for funding for the El Salvadoran government and Nicaraguan contras, in contrast to the AFL-CIO's leadership. In 1987, he was suspended from his government post for 60 days for violating the Hatch Act by speaking in support of Walter Mondale during the 1984 United States presidential election, although this had no effect as he had been on leave since becoming union president, and the charge was overturned in 1988.

In August 1988, Blaylock was defeated for re-election by John Sturdivant. He retired to Montgomery, Alabama, where he died in 2018.

Trade union offices
Preceded by Clyde M. Webber	President of the American Federation of Government Employees; 1976–1988	Succeeded by John Sturdivant
Preceded by Howie McClennan	President of the Public Employee Department; 1981–1985	Succeeded by Gerald McEntee
