= Haffner (disambiguation) =

Haffner may refer to:

== Music ==
- Haffner Serenade, K. 250 by Mozart
- Haffner Symphony, K. 385 by Mozart (his Symphony No. 35)
- Haffner Orchestra in Lancaster, England

== People ==
- Haffner, includes a list of people with the surname Haffner

== Places ==
- Haffner Bjerg, a mountain in Greenland
- Haffner Glacier, a glacier discharging into Robertson Bay, Antarctica
- Haffner Pass, a pass running between Gilbert Glacier and Mozart Ice Piedmont, Antarctica

== See also ==
- Hafner (disambiguation)
- Heffner (disambiguation)
