= Ludwig Häfner =

German fighter ace and Knight's Cross recipient (1921–1942)

- Born: 17 February 1921; Ingolstadt, Germany
- Died: 10 November 1942 (aged 21) north of Stalingrad, Soviet Union
- Cause of death: Killed in action
- Military career
- Allegiance: Nazi Germany
- Branch: Luftwaffe
- Service years: ?–1942
- Rank: Leutnant (second lieutenant)
- Unit: JG 3
- Commands: 3./JG 3
- Conflicts: World War II: Operation Barbarossa; Siege of Malta (World War II); North African Campaign; Battle of Stalingrad
- Awards: Knight's Cross of the Iron Cross

Ludwig Häfner (17 February 1921 – 10 November 1942) was a German Luftwaffe ace and recipient of the Knight's Cross of the Iron Cross during World War II. The Knight's Cross of the Iron Cross, and its variants were the highest awards in the military and paramilitary forces of Nazi Germany during World War II. On 10 November 1942, Ludwig Häfner was killed north of Stalingrad after he was attacked by a large number of Yakovlev Yak-1 fighters. He was posthumously awarded the Knight's Cross on 21 December 1942. During his career he was credited with 52 aerial victories, all on the Eastern Front.

== Career ==
On 26 June 1941, Häfner sustained a bullet wound in aerial combat resulting in a crash landing of his Messerschmitt Bf 109 F-1 (Werknummer 5728—factory number) at Berestechko. Following his convalescence on 7 September, Häfner was again injured when he crashed a Bf 109 F-4 on a shuttle flight at Przemyśl.

=== Squadron leader and death ===
On 1 October 1942, Häfner was appointed Staffelkapitän (squadron leader) of 3. Staffel of Jagdgeschwader 3 (JG 3—3rd Fighter Wing). He succeeded Oberleutnant Alfons Raich who was transferred. On 10 November, Häfner was shot down and killed in action in aerial combat with Yakovlev Yak-1 fighters. His Bf 109 G-2 (Werknummer 13631) crashed 5 kilometers (3.1 miles) west of the airfield at Kolobovka. Command of 3. Staffel was then handed to Leutnant Franz Daspelgruber.

== Summary of career ==
=== Aerial victory claims ===
According to US historian David T. Zabecki, Häfner was credited with 52 aerial victories. Obermaier also lists him 52 aerial victories. In addition, Spick lists him with a mission-to-claim ratio of 3.90. Mathews and Foreman, authors of Luftwaffe Aces — Biographies and Victory Claims, researched the German Federal Archives and found records for 47 aerial victory claims, all of which claimed on the Eastern Front.

Victory claims were logged to a map-reference (PQ = Planquadrat), for example "PQ 39411". The Luftwaffe grid map (Jägermeldenetz) covered all of Europe, western Russia and North Africa and was composed of rectangles measuring 15 minutes of latitude by 30 minutes of longitude, an area of about 360 square miles (930 km^{2}). These sectors were then subdivided into 36 smaller units to give a location area 3 km × 4 km (1.9 mi × 2.5 mi) in size.

Chronicle of aerial victories
This and the ? (exclamation mark) indicates information discrepancies listed by Prien, Stemmer, Rodeike, Bock, Mathews, and Foreman.
Claim	Date	Time	Type	Location	Claim	Date	Time	Type	Location
– 6. Staffel of Jagdgeschwader 3 – Operation Barbarossa — 22 June – 6 November 1941
1	24 June 1941	13:22	Potez 63	30 km (19 mi) east of Hostynne	2	25 June 1941	07:01	DB-3	10 km (6.2 mi) east of Włodzimierz
– 6. Staffel of Jagdgeschwader 3 "Udet" – Eastern Front – 26 April – September 1942
3	20 May 1942	14:25	Il-2	2 km (1.2 mi) southeast of Verhulivka	21	25 July 1942	09:55	Yak-1	Farupolina
4	29 May 1942	06:14	MiG-1	Balakliia	22	25 July 1942	10:12	MiG-1	Ruslow
5	13 June 1942	10:23	Il-2	2 km (1.2 mi) east of Nikolske	23	29 July 1942	17:52	Il-2	PQ 39411, Kalach; 5 km (3.1 mi) southeast of Kalach
6	13 June 1942	10:43	MiG-1	Bodomowka	24	30 July 1942	05:32	LaGG-3	PQ 39253, Kalach; 15 km (9.3 mi) northwest of Pitomnik Airfield
7	1 July 1942	12:05	LaGG-3	7 km (4.3 mi) east of Voronezh	25	30 July 1942	05:47	LaGG-3	PQ 39294, Kalach
8	2 July 1942	08:04	R-5	Stary Oskol	26? (Note: This claim is not listed by Mathews and Foreman.)	30 July 1942	05:48	LaGG-3	PQ 39411, Kalach
9	4 July 1942	13:37	Il-2	Malyschewo	27	30 July 1942	— ? (Note: According to Mathews and Foreman claimed at 05:55.)	Pe-2	Dmitriyevka; 5 km (3.1 mi) southeast of Kalach
10	6 July 1942	16:52? (Note: According to Mathews and Foreman claimed at 16:32.)	Yak-1	Panikorjez	28	31 July 1942	13:45	LaGG-3	PQ 39282, Kalach; 15 km (9.3 mi) west of Pitomnik Airfield
11	9 July 1942	17:55	LaGG-3	3 km (1.9 mi) east of Nowo Ushman	29	31 July 1942	13:55	Il-2	PQ 39192, Kalach; 10 km (6.2 mi) west of Kalach
12	9 July 1942	18:10	LaGG-3	6 km (3.7 mi) southwest of Demschtschinsk	30	31 July 1942	14:05	Il-2	PQ 39183, Skoworin; 20 km (12 mi) west of Kalach
13	9 July 1942	18:13	LaGG-3	3 km (1.9 mi) north of Mal Losowaja center of Lozow	31	6 August 1942	05:35	Pe-2	Stalingrad
14	9 July 1942	18:33	LaGG-3	Wislaja Poljana	32	7 August 1942	05:47	Il-2	PQ 49521, Slotowitoje
15	10 July 1942	04:37	P-39	3 km (1.9 mi) southeast of Rykanje; Voronezh	33	7 August 1942	10:25	LaGG-3	PQ 49521, Sklakatow
16	10 July 1942	09:17	MiG-1	Voronezh	34	20 August 1942	06:20	MiG-1	PQ 40471, Kalach
17	13 July 1942	04:55	Pe-2	Morozovsk (Morosowskaja)	33?	23 August 1942	—	MiG-1	Stalingrad
18	13 July 1942	11:55	R-5	Krasnaja-Jar	34?	23 August 1942	—	LaGG-3	Stalingrad
19	14 July 1942	11:22	Il-2	Gruzynow	37?	21 September 1942	—	LaGG-3	Rzhev
20	23 July 1942	09:30	Yak-1	Kalach	38?	21 September 1942	—	LaGG-3	Rzhev
– 3. Staffel of Jagdgeschwader 3 "Udet" – Eastern Front – September – 10 November 1942
39	29 September 1942	09:35	LaGG-3	7 km (4.3 mi) northwest of Cosmin Leninsk	46	27 October 1942	08:32	MiG-3	PQ 35 Ost 49283; 25 km (16 mi) east of Stalingrad
40	29 September 1942	12:10	MiG-3? (Note: According to Mathews and Foreman claimed as a Lavochkin-Gorbunov-Gudkov LaGG-3.)	12 km (7.5 mi) northeast of Akhtuba; 35 km (22 mi) east of Stalingrad	47	28 October 1942	15:09	LaGG-3	PQ 35 Ost 49223 vicinity of Werchne
41	9 October 1942	14:46	LaGG-3	10 km (6.2 mi) east of Kotluban train station 5 km (3.1 mi) north of Grebenka	48	30 October 1942	14:12	Il-2	PQ 35 Ost 49131 vicinity of Bassargino
42	9 October 1942	14:48	LaGG-3	PQ 35 Ost 49132, Kotluban train station 5 km (3.1 mi) north of Grebenka	49	1 November 1942	14:25	LaGG-3	PQ 35 Ost 59172
43	14 October 1942	07:10	LaGG-3	PQ 35 Ost 40751	50	2 November 1942	12:12	MiG-1	PQ 35 Ost 49422; 30 km (19 mi) east of Stalingrad
44	26 October 1942	11:40	Il-2	PQ 35 Ost 49474 north of Wassnoarmejsk	51	3 November 1942	11:08	Yak-1	PQ 35 Ost 59192
45	27 October 1942	08:12	LaGG-3	PQ 35 Ost 49443; 20 km (12 mi) southeast of Stalingrad	52	10 November 1942	11:54	Yak-1	PQ 35 Ost 59362, north of Kolobowka

=== Awards ===
- Iron Cross (1939) 2nd and 1st Class
- Honor Goblet of the Luftwaffe on 21 September 1942 as Leutnant and pilot
- German Cross in Gold on 25 September 1942 as Leutnant in the 6./Jagdgeschwader 3
- Knight's Cross of the Iron Cross on 21 December 1942 as Leutnant and pilot in the 6./Jagdgeschwader 3 (Note: According to Scherzer as a pilot in the I./Jagdgeschwader 3 "Udet".)
