= Haffner Orchestra =

The Haffner Orchestra is an orchestra based in Lancaster, England. Comprising amateur players and local professionals, the orchestra usually gives three concerts a year in November, February and June. These are held in the University of Lancaster's Great Hall and Lancaster Town Hall's Ashton Hall, often drawing audiences of around 500. In addition, workshops, masterclasses, open rehearsals and community events are part of the orchestra’s programme.

The orchestra was formed in 1976, starting as a chamber orchestra and expanding to a full symphony orchestra. It took its name from Mozart's Haffner Symphony, which in turn was named after one of Mozart's patrons, Sigmund Haffner der Elder.

It is a registered charity, number 509571, and its President is the cellist Raphael Wallfisch.
