= AFGE v. Trump =

2025 lawsuit

American Federation of Government Employees, AFL-CIO v. Trump
- Court: United States District Court for the Northern District of California
- Docket nos.: 1:25-cv-00352, 25-3293

Court membership
- Judge sitting: Susan Illston

American Federation of Government Employees, AFL-CIO, et al. v. Donald J. Trump, et al. is a lawsuit brought against U.S. president Donald Trump, United States federal executive departments, and Trump's second cabinet. Labor unions, non-profit organizations, and local governments sought to prevent the Trump administration from instituting mass layoffs and closing programs.

== Background ==
On February 11, 2025, President Donald Trump signed an executive order planning "large scale" reductions in the workforce of the United States federal government and requiring federal agencies—except those involved in law and immigration enforcement—to receive approval from a Department of Government Efficiency official to hire candidates.

== Lawsuit ==
On April 28, a coalition of labor unions, non-profit organizations, and local governments sued Trump, United States federal executive departments, and Trump's second cabinet in the District Court for the Northern District of California. The plaintiffs included the American Federation of Government Employees and the American Federation of State, County and Municipal Employees, the Alliance for Retired Americans and the Center for Taxpayer Rights, the cities of Baltimore, Chicago, and San Francisco, and the counties of Harris and King. The New York Times described the case as "poised to have the broadest effect yet".

== Case ==
The plaintiffs accused the Trump administration of violating the separation of powers under the United States Constitution. If the Court rules that the president may institute reductions in force, the plaintiffs must go through the Merit Systems Protection Board. On May 9, Judge Susan Illston granted a two-week restraining order hours after an emergency hearing, temporarily blocking the Trump administration's efforts to lay off employees and close programs. Lawyers for the federal government argued that a temporary restraining order was too broad and that the plaintiffs lacked timeliness. Illston disagreed with the federal government in her order, finding that the board had an insufficient number of members to issue decisions and that the federal government had not disclosed its plans to Congress or the plaintiffs.

On May 30, the Court of Appeals for the Ninth Circuit rejected the Trump administration's emergency request to stay the preliminary injunction. The Supreme Court stayed the preliminary injunction on July 8.

== Works cited ==
- Hassan Ali Kanu, Judge temporarily blocks Trump administration from laying off federal employees, Politico (May 9, 2025).
- Tim Fang, San Francisco, Chicago, Baltimore sue Trump administration over cuts to federal workforce, CBS News (April 29, 2025).
- Gary Grumbach, Judge pauses Trump's effort to reduce the size of the federal government, NBC News (May 9, 2025).
- Lauren Kaori Gurley, Unions, local governments sue to block Trump administration's workforce cuts, The Washington Post (April 28, 2025).
- Ian Kullgren & Isaiah Poritz, Ninth Circuit Allows Pause on Trump's Federal Workforce Layoffs, Bloomberg Law (May 30, 2025).
- Zach Montague & Eileen Sullivan, Judge Temporarily Blocks Trump Plans for Mass Layoffs and Program Closures, The New York Times (May 9, 2025).
- Parker Purifoy, Trump's Power Over Mass Layoffs Heads for Courtroom Showdown, Bloomberg Law (May 8, 2025).
- Theodore Schleifer & Madeleine Ngo, Trump Orders Plans for 'Large Scale' Work Force Cuts and Expands Musk's Power, The New York Times (February 11, 2025).
- Jonathan Stempel, Unions, cities, nonprofits sue to block Trump workforce cuts, Reuters (April 29, 2025).
- Abbie VanSickle, Supreme Court Clears Way for Mass Firings at Federal Agencies, The New York Times (July 8, 2025).
