= Veterans' Preference Act =

Veterans’ Preference Act
- Long title: An Act to give honorably discharged veterans, their widows, and the wives of disabled veterans preference in employment where Federal funds are disbursed.
- Enacted by: the 78th United States Congress

Citations
- Public law: Pub. L. Pub. L. 78–359
- Statutes at Large: 58 Stat. 387

Codification
- Acts amended: Multiple subsequent amendments extending preference and eligibility (including 82nd & 83rd Congress acts)
- Titles amended: Title 5, United States Code, § 2108 et seq.

Legislative history
- Introduced in the House as H.R. 4115 by Rep. Joe Starnes (D–AL) on February 3, 1944; Passed the House on or before June 27, 1944; Passed the Senate on or before June 27, 1944; Signed into law by President Franklin D. Roosevelt on June 27, 1944

The Veterans' Preference Act is a United States federal law passed in 1944. It required the federal government to favor returning war veterans when hiring new employees in an attempt to recognize their service, sacrifice, and skills.

== Preference before the Civil War ==
The use of preference in Federal appointments extends back to the days of the Revolutionary War. Though no legal basis existed to govern the treatment of war veterans, certain soldiers were rewarded for their service by the Federal government. Early forms of preference were often based on European models and featured the use of pensions, bonuses for service, disability allowance, and hospitalization for injuries incurred while in uniform, as rewards for service to one's country. It wasn't until the heyday of the spoils system, however, that appointments to Federal positions as a reward for military service become a popular practice. These appointments, however, were usually reserved for ex-officers, and not for the rank and file soldier.

== Civil War to the end of World War I ==
Towards the end of the Civil War, Congress passed the first significant veterans' preference legislation. This act provided that:

Persons honorably discharged from the military or naval service by reason of disability resulting from wounds or sickness incurred in the line of duty shall be preferred for appointments to civil offices, provided they are found to possess the business capacity necessary for the proper discharge of the duties of such offices.

Under this legislation, preference in appointments was limited to disabled veterans who were otherwise qualified for the work to be performed. This 1865 law stood as the basic preference legislation until the end of World War I. Along the way, however, several modifications were made to the 1865 legislation. An amendment in 1871 contained the first instance of "suitability" requirements for job seeking veterans. The language read as follows:

The President is authorized to prescribe such regulations for the admission of persons into the civil service of the United States as may best promote the efficiency thereof, and ascertain the fitness of each candidate in respect to age, health, character, knowledge, and ability for the branch of service into which he seeks to enter, and for this purpose he may employ suitable persons to conduct such inquiries, and may prescribe their duties, and establish regulations for the conduct of persons who may receive appointment in the civil service.

In 1876, another Congressional amendment gave preference for RIF retention to veterans, their widows, and their orphans. This amendment marked the introduction of the use of preference as RIF protection. It provided:

That in making any reduction in force in any of the executive departments the head of such department shall retain those persons who may be equally qualified who have been honorably discharged from the military or naval service of the United States and the widows and orphans of deceased soldiers and sailors.

Determination of the "equal qualifications" of a person entitled to preference under this law was left to the appointing officer.

In 1888, a Civil Service Commission regulation gave absolute preference to all disabled veterans over all other eligibles. In other words, they would qualify with a score of 65, when the minimum passing score for everyone else was a 70, and would be placed at the top of the certification list.

A year later, President Harrison issued an Executive Order allowing honorably discharged veterans who were former Federal employees to be reinstated without time limit. This was the first appearance of reinstatement eligibility as applied to veterans. In 1892, reinstatement rights were extended to the widows and orphans of veterans. The reinstatement provision was the last significant addition to preference legislation until 1919.

== Preference between the World Wars ==
The first major expansion of Veterans' Preference benefits occurred in 1919 in the form of the Census Act. This act, amended shortly thereafter by the Deficiency Act of 1919 granted preference to all honorably discharged veterans, their widows, and the wives of injured veterans. An excerpt reads as follows:

That hereafter in making appointments to clerical and other positions in the executive branch of the Government, in the District of Columbia or elsewhere preference shall be given to honorably discharged soldiers, sailors, and marines, and widows of such, and to the wives of injured soldiers, sailors, and marines, who themselves are not qualified, but whose wives are qualified to hold such positions.

This act is significant for two reasons: it no longer emphasized a service-connected disability as the primary basis for granting veterans' preference, and it introduced the concept of spousal preference in the appointing process. This act redefined eligible veterans to mean all persons who served in an active military capacity and were honorably discharged, whether the service was in wartime or peacetime. Added were their widows and the wives of those too disabled to qualify for government employment. This act remained the basic Federal law for appointment preference until June 27, 1944, when the Veterans' Preference Act of 1944 was enacted.

Two significant modifications were made to the 1919 Act. In 1923, an Executive Order was created which added 10 points to the score of disabled veterans and added 5 points to the scores of non-disabled veterans. This was the first time the points were added to the examination scores in the appointing process. Under this Executive Order, however, veterans were no longer placed at the top of the certification lists. In 1929, another executive order restored the placement of 10 point disabled veterans to the top of certification lists.

In 1938, a Civil Service Commission rule required that the decision by an appointing official to pass over a veteran and select a non-veteran for appointment be subject to review by the commission. Language regarding the pass-over of eligible veterans existed in earlier executive orders, but these early versions only required that the CSC be notified if a pass-over occurred. The 1938 rule strengthened this requirement and marked the first time that the Commission could overturn the pass-over if it did not regard the reasons as being adequate.

== Veterans' Preference Act of 1944 ==
Veterans' preference, as it exists today, derives from the Veterans' Preference Act of 1944. This act, to a large extent, resulted from the veterans organizations' desire to elevate the existing Executive and regulatory orders governing preference to the level of National policy. With a victorious end to World War II clearly in sight, both Congress and the Administration were sympathetic to the veterans organizations' objective. In his endorsement of the legislation, President Roosevelt wrote, "I believe that the Federal Government, functioning in its capacity as an employer, should take the lead in assuring those who are in the armed forces that when they return special consideration will be given to them in their efforts to obtain employment. It is absolutely impossible to take millions of our young men out of their normal pursuits for the purpose of fighting to preserve the Nation, and then expect them to resume their normal activities without having any special consideration shown them."

The act, in essence, was a consolidation of the various preference provision already in effect by the various Executive Orders and CSC regulations. It went a step further by broadening and strengthening existing veterans' preference rules by giving them legislative sanction. Thus, the Executive Branch could no longer change the provisions of veterans' preference. Any changes must now be sought through legislation. In addition, the act made clear that preference was to be a reward for patriotic duties by a grateful country willing to recognize the sacrifices of its servicemen when peace comes. The Act would help ensure that veterans obtain or regain an economic position they otherwise would have attained had they not served in the armed forces. The Veterans preference Act of 1944 defined to whom and under what circumstances preference would be granted. It provided that Preference be given in competitive examinations, in appointments to positions in the Federal service, in reinstatement to positions, in reemployment, and in retention during reductions in force. Preference would apply to civilian positions — permanent or temporary ;— in all departments, agencies, bureaus, administrations, establishments, and projects of the Federal Government, and in the civil service of the District of Columbia. Further, the law provided that preference apply to positions in the classified civil service (now the competitive service), the unclassified civil service (positions excepted from the competitive service), and in any temporary or emergency establishment, agency, bureau, administration, project and department created by acts of Congress or Presidential Executive order. The legislative and judicial branches of the Government, as well as positions in the executive branch, which are required to be confirmed by the United States Senate, except Postmaster-ships, in the first-, second-, and third-class post offices were exempt from the Act.

The Act originally granted preference to non-disabled veterans, disabled veterans, wives of disabled veterans, and the widows of disabled veterans. These were substantially the same groups granted preference under previous laws and regulations with two exceptions. Non-disabled veterans whose only service was performed during peacetime and the wives of non-service-connected disabled veterans over 55 years of age were no longer eligible for preference.

== Veterans' Preference since 1944 ==
In 1948, the Veterans Preference Act of 1944 was amended to include the mothers of veterans. Mother preference was granted to certain widowed, divorced, or legally separated mothers of veterans (men and women) who

- (a) died under honorable conditions while on active duty in any branch of the armed forces of the United States in wartime or in peacetime campaigns or expeditions for which campaign badges or service medals have been authorized; or
- (b) have permanent and total service-connected disabilities which disqualify them for civil service appointment to positions along the general line of their usual occupations.

In the case of such widowed mothers, preference was granted provided they were widowed at the time of death or disability of the veteran and had not remarried. The divorced or legally separated mothers were granted preference only if the veteran was the mother's only child. This provision was later amended in 1950 to allow preference to mothers who are living with their husbands but whose husbands are totally and permanently disabled.

In 1952, a bill (Pub. L. 78–346) was passed granting preference benefits to those honorably separated veterans who served on active duty in any branch of the armed forces of the United States during the period beginning April 28, 1952 and ending July 1, 1955 (the period after the termination of the state of war between the United States and the Government of Japan during which persons could be inducted under existing law for training and service in the armed forces). The bill also extended preference to the widows and mothers of such veterans.

The Vietnam War in the 1960s resulted in several modifications of the VP law of 1944. In 1966, legislation was passed which granted peace-time preference for Vietnam-era vets who served on active duty for more than 180 consecutive days between January 31, 1955 and October 10, 1976; National guard and reserve service was excluded from this legislation.

In 1967 legislation was passed which expanded preference to all veterans who served on active duty for more than 180 days (no requirement to serve during war, campaign, or conflict) between January 31, 1955 and October 10, 1976. As with the previous year's law, National guard and reserve service was not included in this expansion.

The end of the Vietnam War brought with it yet another law, passed in 1976. This law put added restrictions on veterans whose service begins after October 14, 1976. For post-Vietnam era veterans, preference was granted only if these veterans became disabled, or served in a declared war, a campaign, or expedition. This legislation was the result of the conclusion of the Vietnam War and its draft and the United States Department of Defense's desire to build a career military service.

The Civil Service reform act of 1978 created new benefits for veterans with a 30 percent or more disability. It also gave veterans extra protection in hiring and retention. Under this act, preference was no longer granted to nondisabled veterans who retired at the rank of major or above.

In 1988, a law was passed that required the Department of Labor to report agencies' violations of veterans' preference and failure to list vacancies with State employment services to the Office of Personnel Management for enforcement.

The last major legislation affecting veterans' preference occurred in the form of the Defense Appropriations act of 1997. Under this legislation, preference was accorded to anyone who served on active duty during the Gulf War period (August 2, 1990 through January 2, 1992). This law also granted preference to certain service members who earned campaign medals for service in Bosnia and Herzegovina in support of Operation Joint Endeavor (November 20, 1995 through December 20, 1996) or Operation Joint Guard (December 20, 1996 through a date designated by the Secretary of Defense).

== Timeline of veterans' preference in the Federal Civil Service ==
- 1865: First veterans' preference (VP) in appointment law; for Union veterans separated for wounds or illnesses. Vets must have been honorably discharged and qualified for job.
- 1876: First VP in reduction in force (RIF) law
- 1919: After World War I, law grants VP to all honorably discharged veterans, their widows, and the spouses of veterans too disabled to work
- 1921: To distinguish between the preference and granted by the 1865 and 1919 laws, an Executive Order grants disabled vets 10 points and other vets 5 points, to be added to their individual numerical ratings in examinations (pt system first introduced)
- 1929: Executive Order places disabled vets at the top of examination lists of eligibles and continues 10 extra points
- 1944: Veterans' Preference Act incorporates 1865, 1876, and 1919 laws, plus Executive Orders for extra points, passover protection, and rule of three. Continues to be cornerstone of veterans' civil service legislation today (applied preference to active duty service during war, expedition, or campaign for which badge was authorized, must be separated under hon cond, rule of three)
- 1952: Amendment extended 1944 law to include active duty service from 4/28/52 - 7/1/55 Korean War
- 1966: Peacetime preference for Vietnam-era vets added active duty for >180 consecutive days between January 31, 1955 and October 10, 1976; guard and reserve service not included
- 1967: Expanded 1967 act to all vets who served on active duty for >180 days (no req to serve during war, campaign, or conflict) between January 31, 1955 and October 10, 1976 (guard and reserve service not included)
- 1968: Executive Order creates Veterans' Transitional Appointment, a new way for Vietnam-era veterans to enter Federal service without public examination. Forerunner of Veterans Readjustment Appointment (VRA)
- 1974: VRA enacted into law
- 1976: By law, veterans whose service begins after October 14, 1976 are granted preference only if they become disabled, or serve in a declared war, a campaign, or expedition. (This resulted from the end of the Vietnam War and draft and Department of Defenses desire to build a career military service.
- 1978: Civil Service reform act creates new benefits for 30 percent or more disabled veterans; special appointing authority, and extra protection in hiring and retention. Preference ends for nondisabled retired majors and above. Efforts to broaden rule of three and make exceptions to numerical ratings in examinations defeated by veterans' groups
- 1988: Law requires Dept. of Labor to report agencies' violations of veterans' preference and failure to list vacancies with State employment services to OPM for enforcement
- 1990: VRA law amended to include post-Vietnam-era veterans, but end coverage of most Vietnam-era veterans
- 1992: VRA law revised to restore eligibility to Vietnam-era veterans
- 1997: Defense Appropriations Act grants preference to gulf war veterans and certain campaign medal holders in Bosnia (included guard or reserve service if for other than training)
