= Howie McClennan =

American labor union leader (1907–2002)

William Howard "Howie" McClennan (September 11, 1907 – October 7, 2002) was an American labor union leader.

Born in Boston, McClennan was educated at Boston High School and then Boston University. He became a manager for United Markets, then in 1942 became a firefighter, also joining the International Association of Fire Fighters. He served as the union's vice-president for its New England region, and was then elected as president in 1968. As leader of the union, he championed the Federal Fire Prevention and Control Act of 1974, and also served as director of the National Burn Center from 1972.

In 1974, McClennan was also elected as president of the AFL-CIO's new Public Employees' Department. He added the post of vice-president of the AFL-CIO in 1977. He retired as president of the fire fighters in 1980, becoming president emeritus, and then stood down from his other union posts in 1981.

Trade union offices
Preceded by William D. Buck	President of the International Association of Fire Fighters; 1968–1980	Succeeded by Jack Gannon
Preceded by Department founded	President of the Public Employee Department; 1974–1981	Succeeded by Kenneth T. Blaylock
