= Everett Kelley (unionist) =

American labor union leader

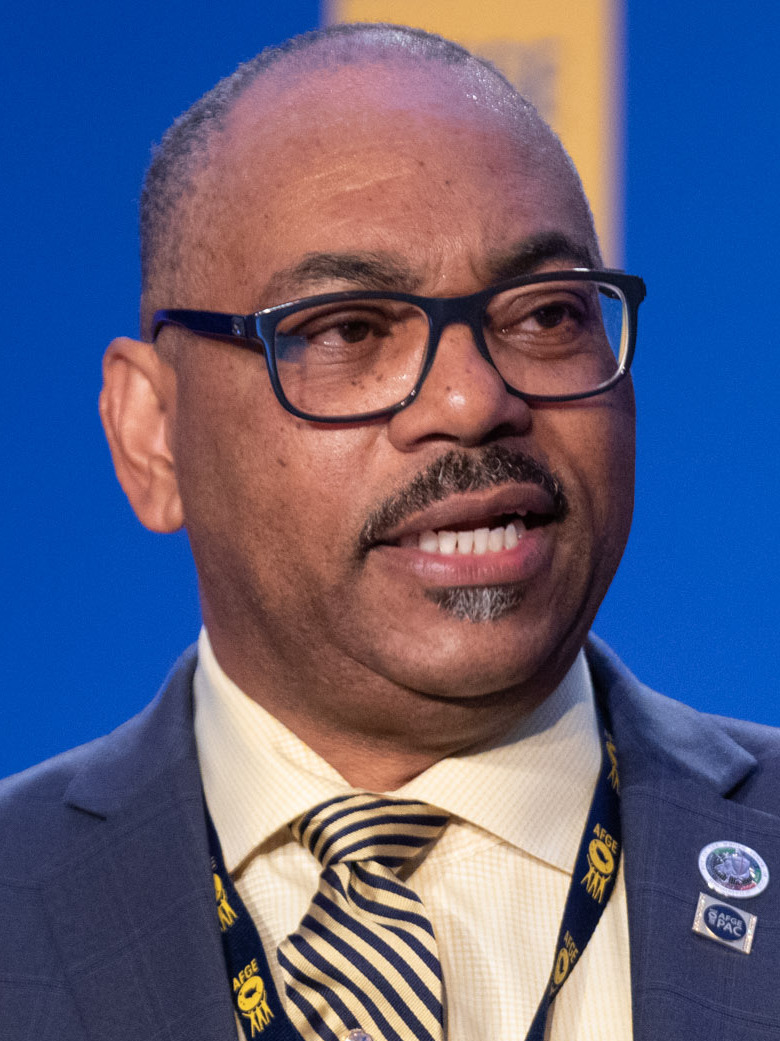
- Kelley in 2020
- Born: Goodwater, Alabama, U.S.
- Education: Central Alabama Community College (AA); Selma University (BTh); Rushing Springs School of Theology (ThM)
- Occupation: President of AFGE

Everett B. Kelley is an American labor union leader and president of the American Federation of Government Employees since 2020.

Born in Goodwater, Alabama, Kelley was educated at Sylacauga High School, then joined the United States Army, serving for three years, and then for a further eight in the reserve. After leaving the Army, he earned an associate's degree at Central Alabama Community College, a bachelor's of theology at Selma University, and a master's of theology at Rushing Springs School of Theology. He then became a professor at Rushing Springs, and also at the Birmingham-Easonian Baptist Bible College. He became senior pastor at the St. Mary Missionary Baptist Church in Lincoln, Alabama, serving for 31 years.

== Union activities ==
From 1981, Kelley worked at the Anniston Army Depot, where he joined the American Federation of Government Employees. He became president of his local in 2002, serving until 2011, in which time, he more than doubled its membership. He next became a national vice-president of the union, covering district 5, in which he also increased membership. He was elected as national secretary-treasurer of the union in 2018, and then as president in 2020. He was also elected as a vice-president of the AFL-CIO. In 2022, he won the AFL-CIO's Eyes on the Prize Award, and also the Alabama AFL-CIO's Labor Person of the Year Award.

Trade union offices
Preceded by Eugene Hudson	Secretary-Treasurer of the American Federation of Government Employees; 2018–2020	Succeeded by Eric Bunn
Preceded by Jeffrey David Cox	President of the American Federation of Government Employees; 2020–present	Succeeded by Incumbent
