= Jack Hafer =

American film producer and executive

Jack Hafer is an American film producer and film executive. As of 2015, he was the head of the production company Boulevard Pictures. Hafer was also department head of the Biola University Cinema & Media Arts Department.

== Career ==
Hafer Was the producer of the film, To End All Wars (2001) starring Kiefer Sutherland and Robert Carlyle. The film screened at the Cannes Film Festival, won Best Picture at the Heartland Film Festival, was awarded the Commander in Chief Medal of Service, Honor and Pride by the Veterans of Foreign Wars, and showcased at the 2003 Cannes Film Festival Cinema for Peace.

Hafer was vice president and general manager of GMT Studios in Culver City, California.

In 2005, Hafer received a Santa Barbara Award for Excellence in film at the Cinema in Focus Festival.

Hafer recently finished the narrative feature, Not That Funny, starring Tony Hale. He was also developing several features including James Dean: the Movie, Fallen Earth, and Gideon.

Their documentary work includes production on Wall of Separation (PBS), Lines That Divide and School's Out – all part of The Culture Wars: A Series.

In 2014 Hafer was an associate professor at Biola University, and a member of the Producers Guild of America. He produced the annual Biola Media Conference on the CBS Studio Lot, a conference for Christian industry professionals.
