= Jon Haffner =

Norwegian physician

Johan ("Jon") Fredrik Wilhelm Haffner (born 2 March 1940) is a Norwegian surgeon and Professor Emeritus at the University of Oslo. He served as president of the Norwegian Medical Association from 1988 to 1991. His research has focused on the excitatory adrenergic response in gastric smooth muscle, and he has authored several textbooks and articles in his field.

Haffner graduated as a physician in Glasgow in 1964 and earned a dr.med. (D.Sc.) degree in medicine at the University of Oslo in 1973. He became a specialist in general surgery in 1977 and gastroenterological surgery in 1981. He became a senior consultant at Oslo University Hospital, Ullevål in 1983. In 2003 he became professor at the University of Oslo.

He is a son of Johan Haffner, who was President of the Norwegian Medical Association 1954–1957.

Academic offices
Preceded by Bengt-Lasse Lund	President of the Norwegian Medical Association; 1988–1991	Succeeded by Knut Eldjarn
