= Berniece Heffner =

American labor unionist

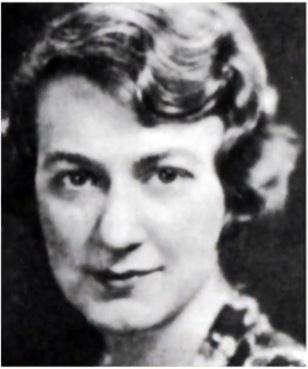
Heffner in about 1940

Berniece B. "Bunny" Heffner (1897 or 1898 – May 24, 1989) was an American labor unionist.

Born in Tiffin, Ohio, Heffner studied at Heidelberg College before in 1919 moving to Fort Sill, Oklahoma, to work as a typist. In 1935, she was appointed as the first secretary-treasurer of the American Federation of Government Employees, moving to Washington DC. In the role, she served on numerous government commissions and labor boards. She also served as acting president of the union on three occasions, when incumbents resigned or died.

In 1953, Heffner moved to become Director of Personnel for the International Brotherhood of Teamsters. She served in the post until her retirement in 1974.

Trade union offices
Preceded by New position	Secretary-Treasurer of the American Federation of Government Employees; 1935–1953	Succeeded by Henrietta E. Olding
