= Kolobovka =

Kolobovka Колобовка
- Selo
- Location within Volgograd Oblast Location within Russia
- Coordinates: 48°39′N 45°27′E
- Country: Russia
- Region: Volgograd Oblast
- District: Leninsky District
- Time zone: UTC+4:00

Kolobovka (Russian: Колобовка) is a rural locality (a selo) and the administrative center of Kolobovskoye Rural Settlement, Leninsky District, Volgograd Oblast, Russia. The population was 862 as of 2010. There are 23 streets.

== Geography ==
Kolobovka is located on the left bank of the Akhtuba River, between Solodovka and Stasov, 23 km southeast of Leninsk (the district's administrative centre) by road. Solodovka is the nearest rural locality.
