= Josef Anton Hafner =

German painter

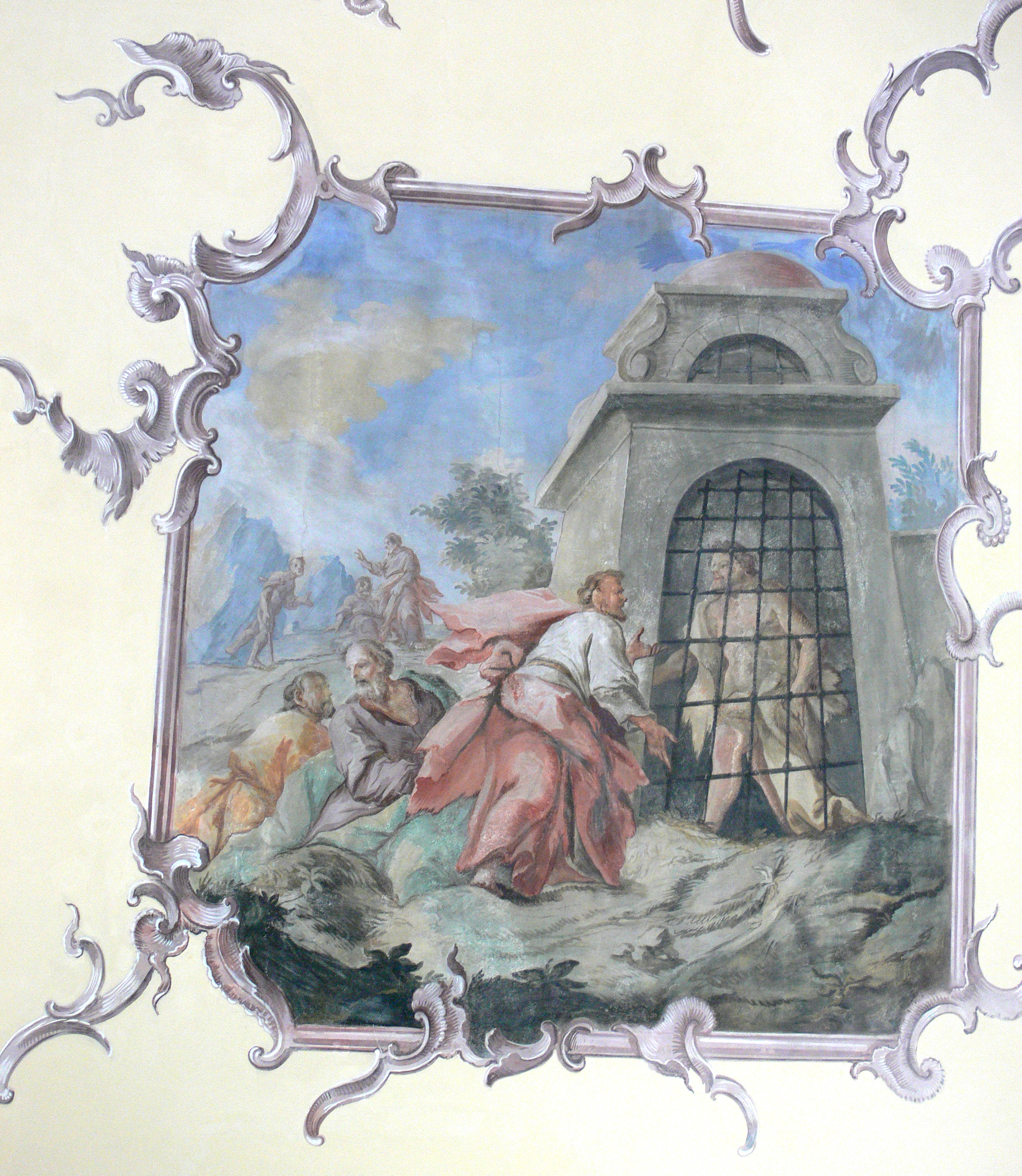
John the Baptist in prison (1750)

Josef Anton Hafner (15 August 1709 in Türkheim – 1756 in Türkheim) was a German decorative painter.

== Life and work ==
He was the son of a tailor, and probably studied in Augsburg with Johann Georg Bergmüller, who was also from Türkheim. His earliest attributed work is an altarpiece in Lindenberg im Allgäu, depicting Saint George. Records show that, in 1732, he was paid for several works at the Church of Saint Magnus in Rammingen, including some that are now lost.

Shortly after, he created a flag for the All Souls' Brotherhood in Türkheim, that depicted purgatory on one side, and was used for funerals until the early 20th century. This was followed by two ceiling paintings at the St. Peter und Paul chapel. In 1734, he created more flags for the Brotherhood. Two years later, he executed several works at the Mariä Himmelfahrt Parish Church.

His first large scale work was produced in 1740; a complex series of Biblical and hagiographic scenes at Klosterbeuren Abbey. This resulted in numerous orders for similar works. He was apparently involved in painting several church ceilings in the area around Lake Constance, c.1745. He may have also worked for private individuals, but this has not been firmly established. His greatest work is generally considered the high altar picture at the Holy Ghost Parish Church in Apfeldorf, showing Mary as Queen of the Rosary (1755).

He died of consumption sometime in 1756.

== Sources ==
- "Hafner, Josef Anton". In: Ulrich Thieme, Fred. C. Willis (Eds.): Allgemeines Lexikon der Bildenden Künstler von der Antike bis zur Gegenwart, Vol.15: Gresse–Hanselmann. E. A. Seemann, Leipzig 1922, pg. 449 (Online)
- Andrea Schaller: "Hafner, Josef Anton", In: Allgemeines Künstlerlexikon, Vol.67, de Gruyter, Berlin 2010, pg. 369 ISBN 978-3-598-23034-9
- Hermann Haisch, ed. (1987), Landkreis Unterallgäu, Memmingen: Memminger Zeitung Verlagsdruckerei GmbH, p. 820, ISBN 3-9800649-2-1
