= Josef Hafner =

Austrian painter and color lithographer

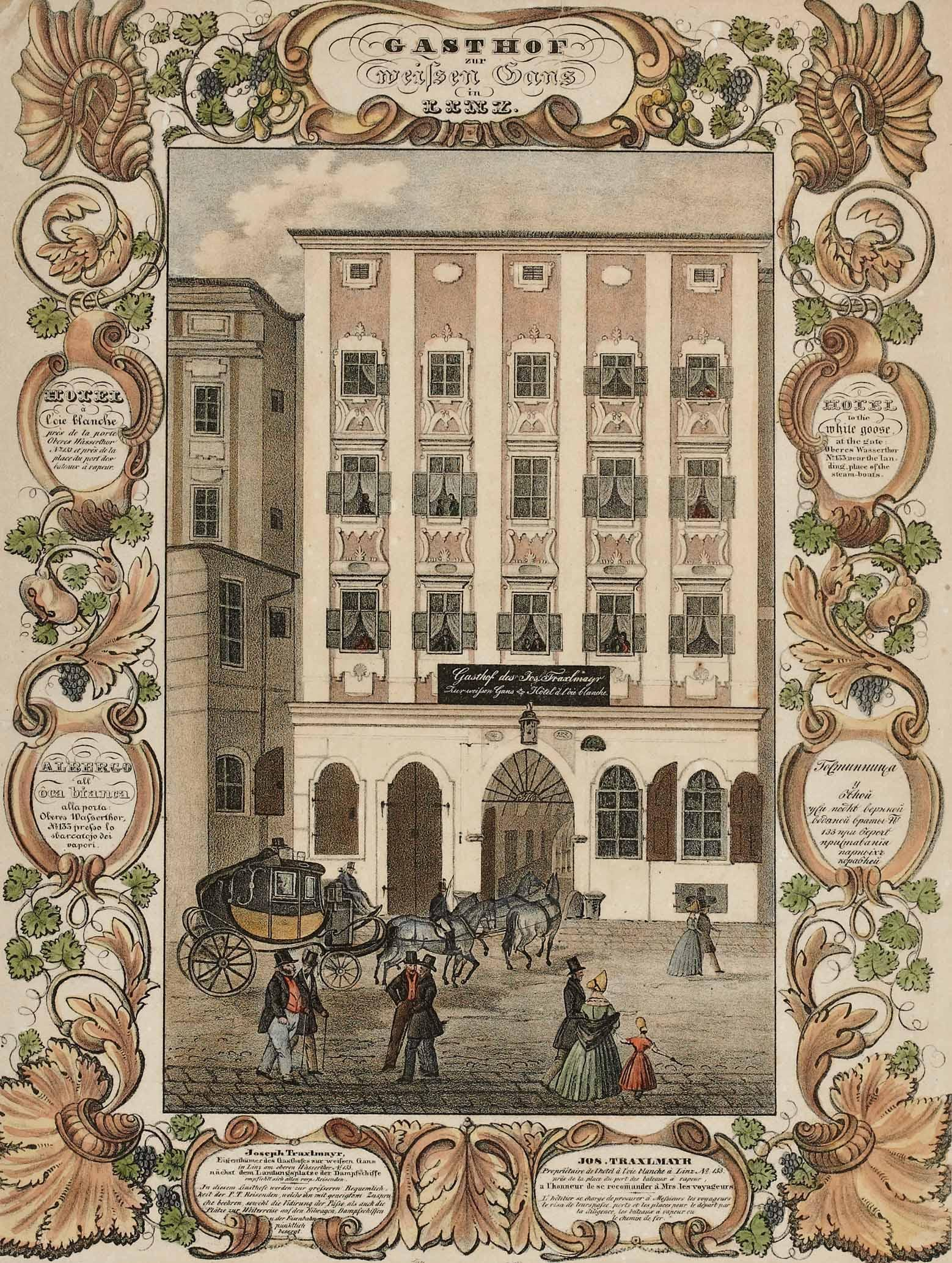
Inn of the White Goose, Linz

Josef Hafner (22 May 1799 – 10 April 1891) was an Austrian painter and color lithographer.

== Life and work ==
Hafner was born on 22 May 1799 in Enns. His father was the administrator of the prison at the old monastery in Baumgartenberg. In 1811, the prison was moved to Linz Castle and his family followed. There, he began to take drawing lessons at the elementary school. When he was old enough, his father allowed him to attend the Academy of Fine Arts in Vienna, where he won several awards.

After returning to Linz in 1827, he set up the first lithographic institute there. At first, he found it necessary to give private drawing lessons to maintain the institute, but it was eventually successful and would remain in business for thirty-six years, until photography became more popular.

He created over 180 views of Upper Austria, Salzburg, and Styria, as well as 200 of Linz; including panoramas, maps and portraits. In 1841, he received a special award for a map of the Diocese of Linz. He opened two shops to sell his works; one on the Main Plaza.

He served on the Municipal Council for twelve years, sat on the central committee of the General Savings Bank, and was head of the art department on the administrative board of the Upper Austrian State Museums. He was also an avid collector of watches. His collection was acquired by the State Museums in 1905.

Hafner died on 10 April 1891 in Linz.

== Sources ==
- "Hafner Josef". In: Österreichisches Biographisches Lexikon 1815–1950 (ÖBL). Vol. 2, Austrian Academy of Sciences, Vienna 1959, p. 141 f. (Direct links to "p. 141", "p. 142")
- Eduard Straßmayr: "Josef Hafner (Lebensbilder aus Oberösterreich)", In: Heimatland (Upper Austria), June 1959
- Else Giordani: Die Linzer Hafner-Offizin. Josef Hafner und seine lithographische Anstalt, Kulturverwaltung der Stadt Linz. 1962, pg.276
