= American Federation of Government Employees =

American labor union

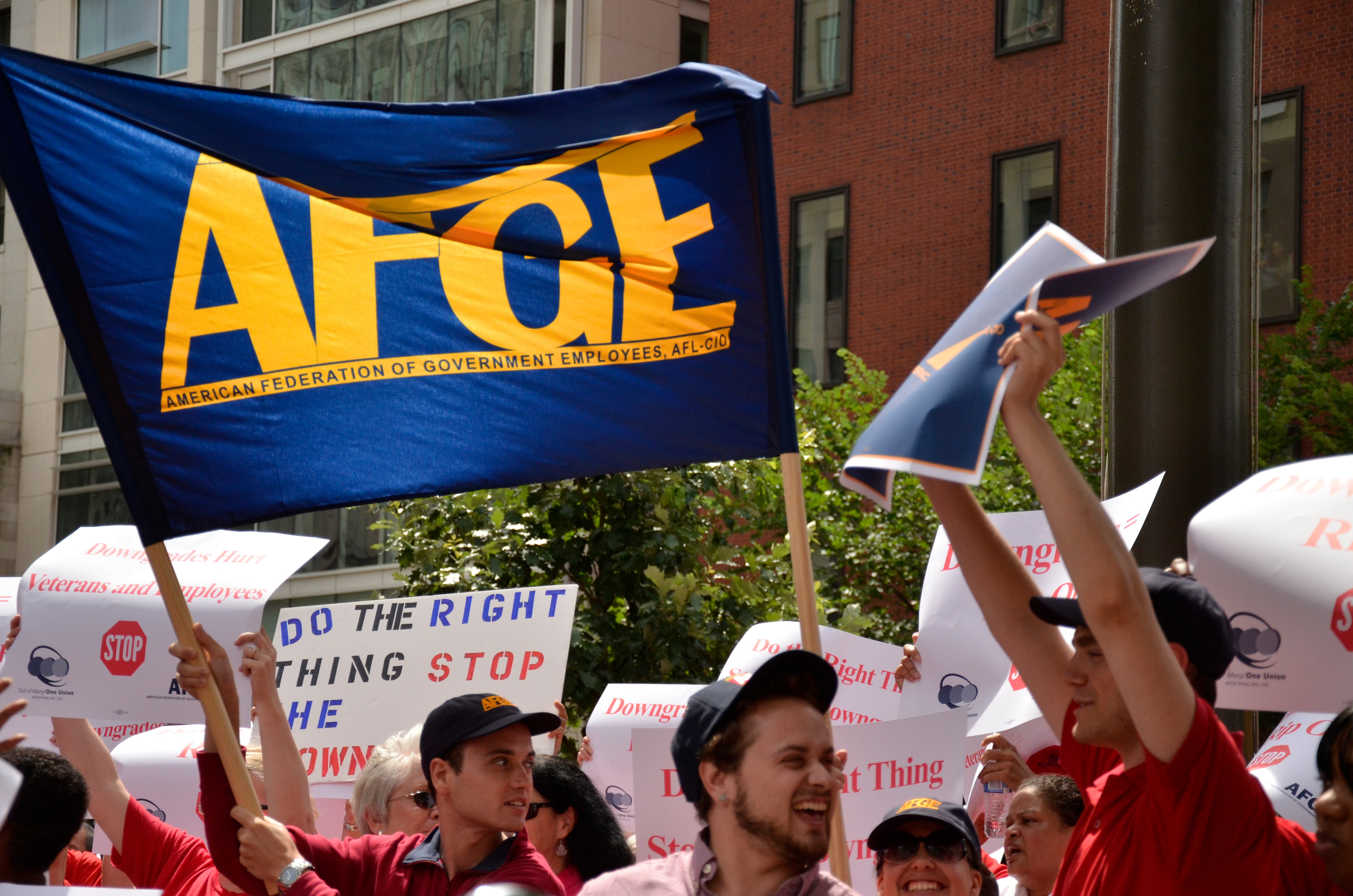
- AFGE rally against Department of Veterans Affair budget cuts in 2012
- Abbreviation: AFGE
- Founded: August 18, 1932
- Type: Labor union
- Headquarters: Washington, D.C.
- Location: United States
- Members: 225,355 (2025)
- President: Everett Kelley
- Affiliations: AFL–CIO
- Website: AFGE.org

The American Federation of Government Employees (AFGE) is an American labor union representing over 820,000 employees of the federal government and the District of Columbia as of 2022. AFGE is the largest union for civilian, non-postal federal employees and the largest union for District of Columbia employees who report directly to the mayor (i.e., outside of D.C. public schools). It is affiliated with the AFL-CIO.

AFGE is a federation of local unions, with each local maintaining autonomy through operating under local constitutions that comply with the AFGE national constitution ratified during its founding in 1932. Its headquarters is in Washington, D.C.

Labor relations in the federal sector are governed by the Federal Labor Relations Authority, an independent federal agency, and federal sector unions have recourse to binding arbitration and to the Federal Services Impasses Panel to resolve impasses. Under 5 U.S.C. § 7311 and 18 U.S.C. § 1918, federal employees are prohibited from striking against the United States government, and doing so is a criminal offense.

== History ==
=== Early history ===
Original AFGE logo

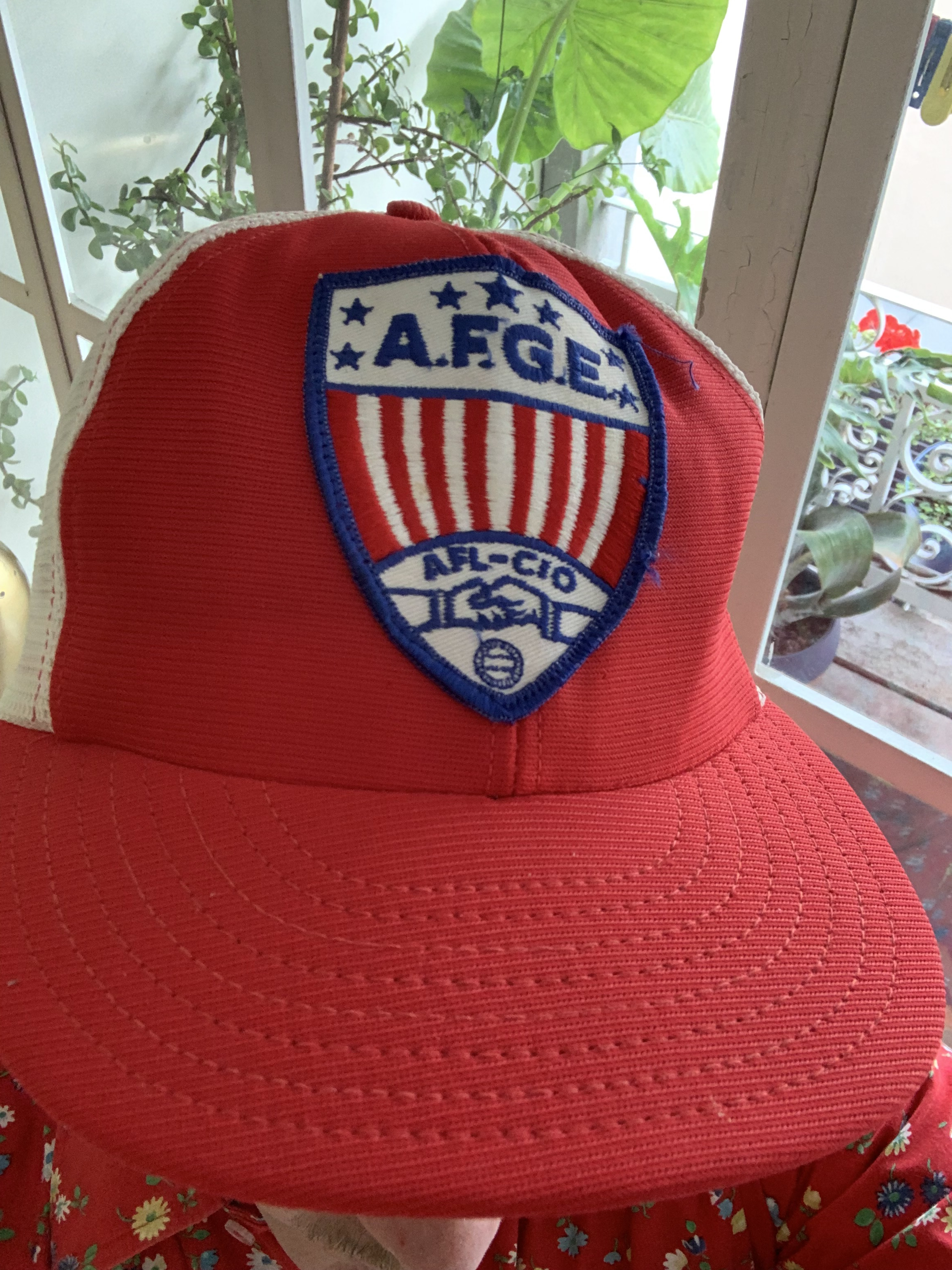
AFGE ball cap from the 1980s.

Federal and postal employees have been granted the right to join and form labor organizations since the Lloyd–La Follette Act of 1912. The act also prohibits federal employees from striking. Prior to the establishment of AFGE, a small number of federal workers were represented by the Knights of Labor and the National Federation of Federal Employees (NFFE). The NFFE received a charter from the American Federation of Labor (AFL) in 1917. AFGE was founded in August 1932 by local unions affiliated with the AFL that broke away from the NFFE after it became independent of the AFL. AFGE's motto was established as "To Do For All That Which No One Can Do For Oneself". Its original emblem was a shield with the stars and stripes and the words "Justice, Fraternity, Progress".

AFGE’s constituent units were referred to as lodges until 1968, when they were renamed locals. A local may represent a single bargaining unit or multiple bargaining units, depending on the agency.

In 1962, President John F. Kennedy issued Executive Order 10988, which first granted federal employees the right to collective bargaining. This right was later codified into law through the Civil Service Reform Act of 1978. Signed by President Jimmy Carter, the act also established the Federal Labor Relations Authority (FLRA) to oversee labor-management relations.

=== Recent history (2000–2025) ===
AFGE filed a series of lawsuits in the 2000s that resulted in the suspension of key components of the George W. Bush administration’s National Security Personnel System at the Department of Defense and the MaxHR personnel system at the Department of Homeland Security (DHS). The union also supported legislative changes intended to create a more balanced process for contracting-out decisions affecting federal employees.

Employees of the Transportation Security Administration, part of DHS, elected AFGE as their union representative in June 2011, adding approximately 39,000 workers to the union’s representation.

The union chose blue and gold as the union's official colors at its national convention in August 2015. Since then, the current emblem is three workers supporting a globe with a map of the United States and the words "Proud to Make America Work".

AFGE formally ended its representation of officers within Immigration and Customs Enforcement (ICE) in 2022. The affected employees had been represented by AFGE’s National ICE Council, which had experienced internal disagreements with the union’s national leadership. In July 2022, AFGE filed a disclaimer of interest with the FLRA, and in August 2022 the FLRA granted the request, revoking AFGE’s certification and dissolving the bargaining unit, thereby ending the formal relationship.

In April 2025, a coalition of labor unions including AFGE, non-profit organizations, and local governments sued President Donald Trump, United States federal executive departments, and Trump's second cabinet over the federal mass layoffs in his second term in the lawsuit AFGE v. Trump. The union also sued over Executive Order 14251, which removed collective bargaining rights for employees in over 40 federal agencies and subdivisions deemed to have primary missions in national security. During his second term, Trump also eliminated the option of automatic payroll deductions of dues for federal employees.

== Organization ==
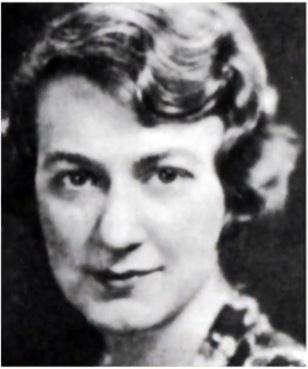
Berniece Heffner was the first national Secretary and Treasurer of AFGE.

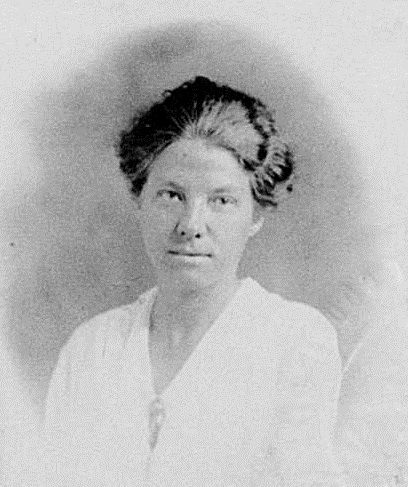
Henrietta Olding was an early vice president of District 2 and a labor and women’s rights activist.

AFGE is led by a National Executive Council, made up of a National President, National Secretary-Treasurer, National Vice President for Women's and Fair Practices, and 12 National Vice Presidents who oversee geographic districts and are elected at District caucuses.

=== Presidents ===
1932: David R. Glass
1932: John Arthur Shaw
1933: Claude Babcock
1936: Charles Irwin Stengle
1939: Cecil E. Custer
1939: James B. Burns
1948: James G. Yaden
1950: Henry C. Iler
1951: James A. Campbell
1962: John Griner
1972: Clyde M. Webber
1976: Ken Blaylock
1988: John Sturdivant
1997: Bobby Harnage
2003: John Gage
2012: Jeffrey David Cox
2020: Everett Kelley

=== Secretary-Treasurers ===
1935: Berniece Heffner
1953: Henrietta E. Olding
1956: Esther F. Johnson
1970: Douglas H. Kershaw
1974: Nicholas Nolan
1986: Allen H. Kaplan
1991: Bobby Harnage
1997: Rita Mason
2000: Jim Davis
2006: Jeffrey David Cox
2012: Eugene Hudson
2018: Everett Kelley
2020: Eric Bunn

== Districts ==
AFGE is divided into twelve geographic districts, each with its own regional office. The twelve districts are:

- District 2: Connecticut, Maine, Massachusetts, New Hampshire, New Jersey, New York, Rhode Island, Vermont
- District 3: Delaware, Pennsylvania
- District 4: Maryland, North Carolina, Virginia, West Virginia
- District 5: Alabama, Florida, Georgia, South Carolina, Tennessee, Puerto Rico, Virgin Islands
- District 6: Indiana, Kentucky, Ohio
- District 7: Illinois, Michigan, Wisconsin
- District 8: Iowa, Minnesota, Nebraska, North Dakota, South Dakota
- District 9: Arkansas, Kansas, Missouri, Oklahoma
- District 10: Louisiana, Mississippi, Texas, New Mexico, Panama
- District 11: Alaska, Colorado, Idaho, Montana, Oregon, Utah, Washington, Wyoming, Guam, Okinawa
- District 12: Arizona, Hawaii, California, Nevada
- District 14: D.C., Maryland (Prince George's County, Montgomery County), Virginia (Fairfax County, Prince William County), Europe

== Councils of Locals ==
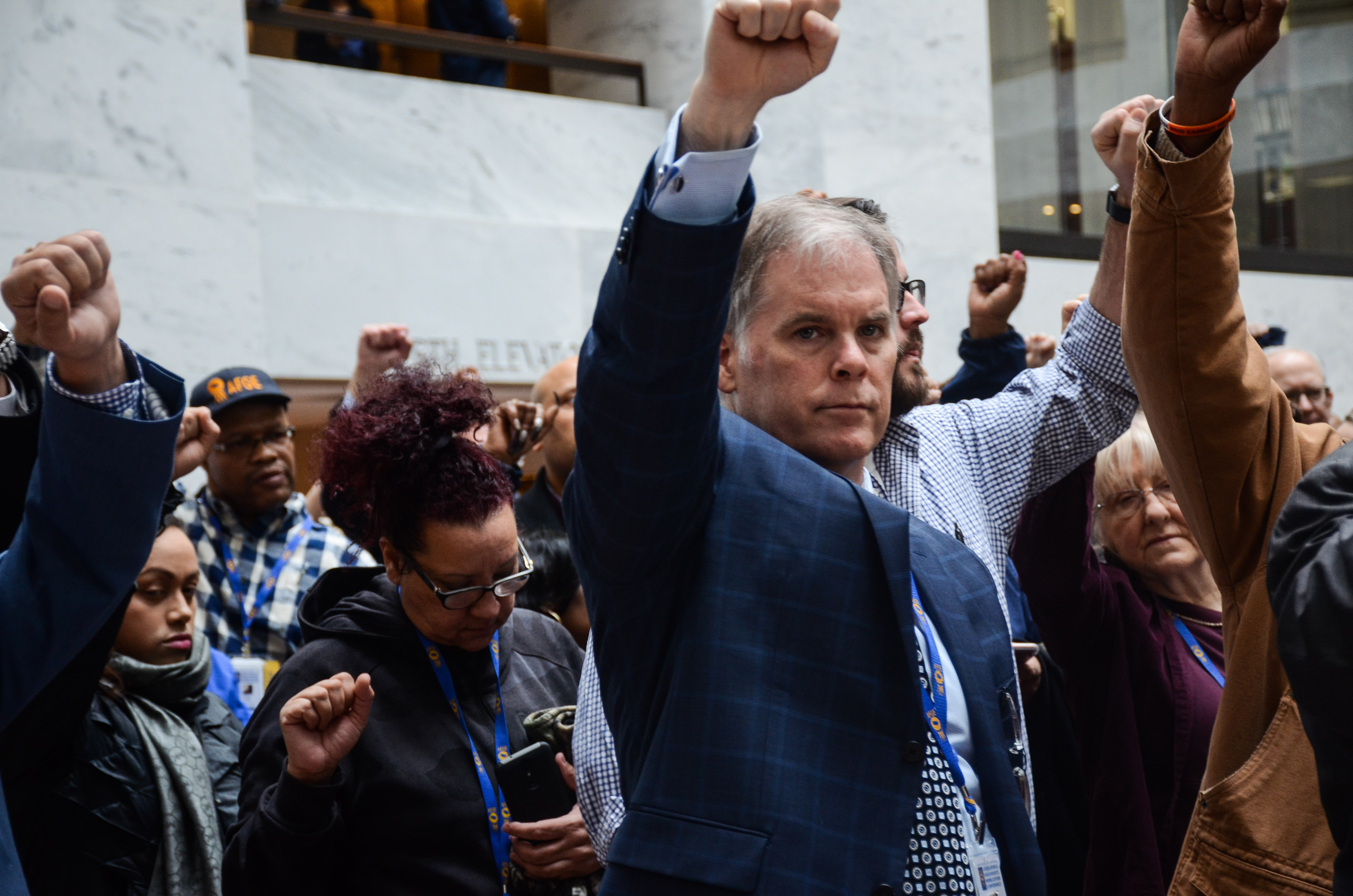
AFGE members hold a silent protest to demand that Congress avoid another government shutdown, 2019.

For AFGE, collective bargaining responsibilities are delegated to numbered "Councils of Locals" at major agencies, including the following:

- AFGE DEFCON
- AFGE Federal Law Enforcement Council
- AFGE Firefighters Steering Committee
- Federal Protective Service Council
- The Food Safety Inspection Service (USDA) Council
- National Border Patrol Council
- National Council of Prisons Locals
- National Joint Council of Food Inspection Locals
- National Council of VA Locals
- TSA Council
- CIS Council
- Coast Guard Council
- Defense Contract Management Agency
- DFAS Council of Locals
- Midwest Council of Food Inspection Locals
- Air Force Materiel Command Locals
- National Council of EEOC Locals
- National Council of SSA Field Operations Locals
- National Council of HUD Locals
- EPA Locals
- Council of NARA Locals

== Membership ==
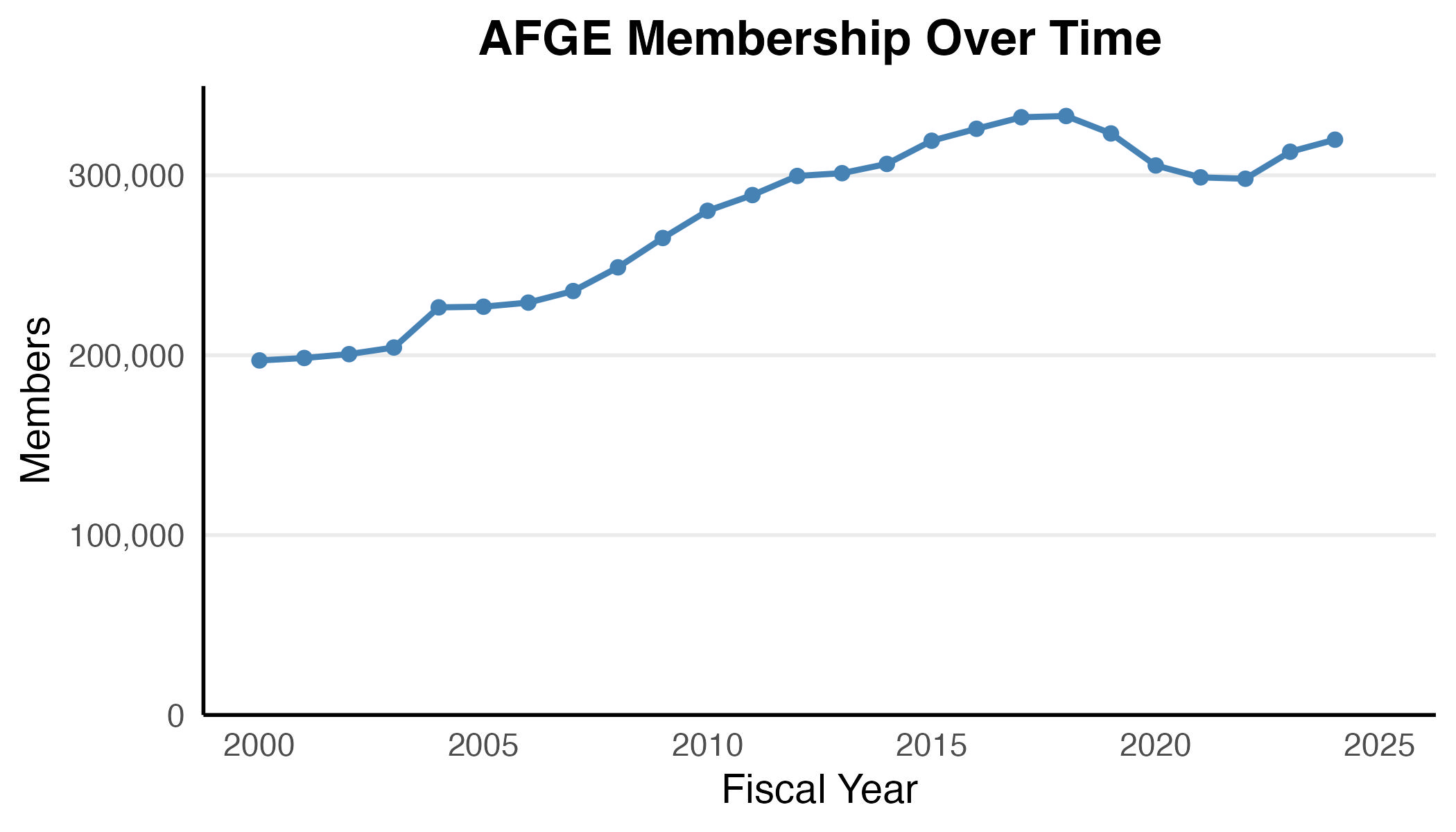
AFGE membership from 2000 to 2024.

AFGE began with 562 members in 1932 and grew to 37,199 members across 328 lodges (now locals) by 1936. By 1960, this number had grown to 70,000.

Dues-paying membership was reported as 197,096 at the end of fiscal year 2000. This number peaked in fiscal year 2018 with 332,977 members. In 2025, there were 225,355 members. Approximately 42% of AFGE membership came from the National VA Council in 2024.

All federal sector union membership is voluntary, as the law prohibits closed shops. Federal employees are barred from being candidates for partisan political office, and no dues money may be spent on partisan political campaigns.

== See also ==
- Barbara Hutchinson, former director of the women's department
- United Public Workers of America
- National Federation of Federal Employees
- American Federation of State, County and Municipal Employees
- National Treasury Employees Union
