= Thomas Häfner =

German painter

- Born: 1928; Germany
- Died: 1985 (aged 56–57); Germany
- Occupation: Painter

Thomas Häfner (1928–1985) was a realistic and fantastic art painter. Häfner was a member of a group of German artists who called themselves the Young Realists, formed in Düsseldorf in the mid-Fifties.

Escaping the horrors of the Second World War, he live for a decade in Ceylon (1938–1948). He studied at the Kunstakademie in Düsseldorf. Detail from his painting "Lucifer" is used to illustrate the novel "Moravagine" by Blaise Cendrars.
