= Shelley Appleton =

American trade union executive and attorney

- Born: Shelley Apfelberg; June 19, 1919; New York City, U.S.
- Died: July 27, 2005 (aged 86); New York City, U.S.
- Occupations: Union executive, attorney
- Known for: Leading International Ladies Garment Workers Union
- Spouse: Jean Dubinsky
- Relatives: David Dubinsky (father-in-law)

Shelley Appleton (né Apfelberg; June 11, 1919 - July 27, 2005) was an American trade union executive and attorney who served as vice-president and general secretary treasurer of the International Ladies' Garment Workers' Union.

== Early life ==
Appleton was born June 11, 1919 in New York City, the younger of two sons, to Isadore Apfelberg (1888-1959) and Sarah Apfelberg (née Somer; 1897-1976), both Jewish immigrants from Galicia. He and his brother, Stephen, americanized their names at some point from Apfelberg to Appleton. He graduated from New York University in 1940 with a Bachelor of Arts respectively LL.B.

== Career ==
Appleton was an organizer in the Eastern Out-of-Town Department from 1941 to 1942. After serving in the United States Army Air Forces in World War II and earning a Bronze Star for his service, Appleton became Business Agent in the ILGWU's Office and Distribution Employees Local 99 in 1946.

In 1951, Appleton was elected Assistant Manager of Local 99, and in 1953, Manager of Local 99. In 1959, Appleton left Local 99 to become manager of the Skirt and Sportswear Workers Local 23, a position he maintained through the merger of Local 23 and 25 to create Local 23–25. In 1961, he was elected a Vice-President of the ILGWU. He retired from the ILGWU in 1983.

In addition to his work with the ILGWU, Appleton served as chairman of the ILGWU's international affairs committee, member of the Women's American ORT (Organization for Rehabilitation through Training), board member of the National Committee for Rural Schools, treasurer of the Reunion of Old Timers, chairman of the World ORT Union (1980-1983), and president of the Tamiment Institute (1986-2005).

== Personal life ==
He married Jean Dubinsky (1919-2015), the only daughter of David Dubinsky, who was previously married to Captain Lester Narins by Fiorello La Guardia himself. She had a daughter from this previous marriage. Appleton resided on Bank Street in the West Village for the majority of his life. They sold their townhouse to the Arons family, who is known for co-founding of Kate Spade.

== Sources ==
ILGWU. Communication Department biography files. 5780/177. Kheel Center for Labor Management Documentation and Archives, Cornell University.

"Shelley Appleton, Garment Union Official, 86." New York Times. 29 Jul. 2005. Web. 26 Jan 2011.

Trade union offices
Preceded by Sol Chaikin	Secretary-Treasurer of the International Ladies' Garment Workers' Union; 1977–1983	Succeeded by Jay Mazur
