= Louis Stulberg =

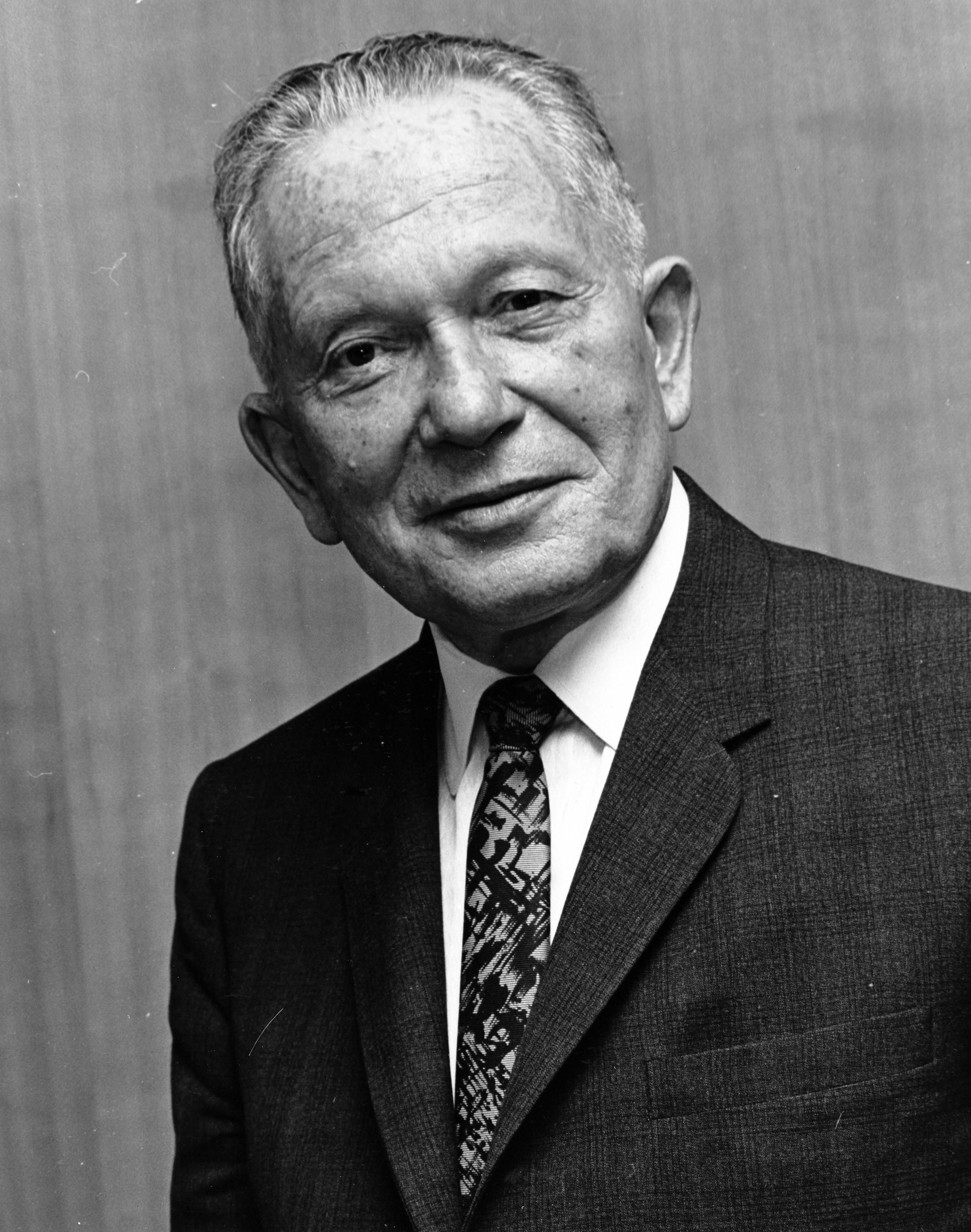
Stulberg c. 1960s

Louis Stulberg (1901–1977) was president of the International Ladies' Garment Workers' Union (ILGWU) from 1966 to 1975.

== Biography ==
=== Early life ===
Louis Stulberg emigrated with his parents from Poland to Canada in 1904. In 1915, he became a cutter and joined Local 83 of the ILGWU. He graduated from the Harbord Collegiate Institute in Toronto in 1918, and the next year, he moved to the United States.

Stulberg first moved to Chicago, where he attended school, worked as a cutter, and joined ILGWU Local 81. Stulberg moved around the country, working as a cutter and union organizer in Toledo, Ohio, and Chicago (1924–1927). He also played minor league baseball for the Memphis Chicks, a charter member of the Southern Association.

=== Work with the ILGWU ===
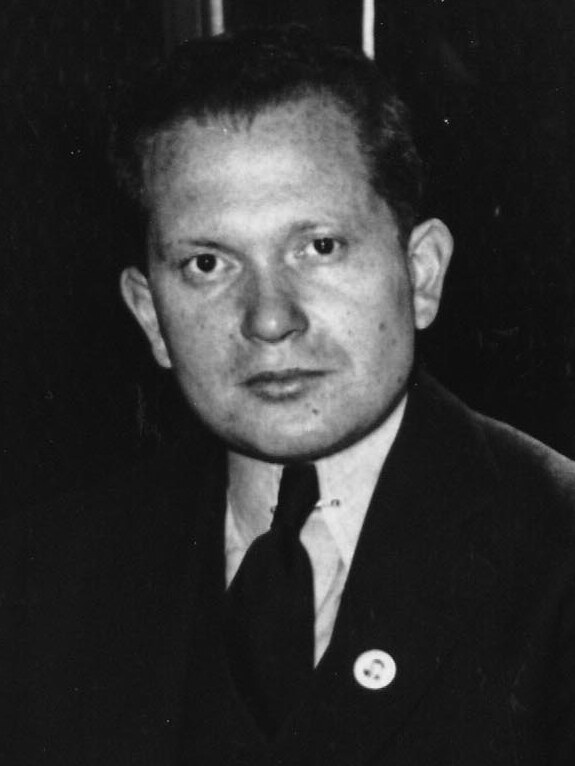
Stulberg c. 1930s

It was in New York that he finally settled, first working as business agent and assistant manager of Local 10 (1929–1945), then as manager of Local 62 (1947–1956). Stulberg began service at the international level as Assistant General Secretary (1945), followed by the positions of Vice President (1947), Executive Vice President (1956), and General Secretary Treasurer (1959). He was elected president of the union in 1966, succeeding David Dubinsky, and served until his retirement in 1975.

As president of the ILGWU, Stulberg became involved in national and international labor organization. In the United States, Stulberg was elected as a vice president and executive council member of the AFL-CIO. Internationally, he served on a United States delegation to the United Nations (1968), an AFL-CIO delegation to the British Trades Union Congress (1972).

Still, Stulberg's term was an inward-looking time, after the long tenure of David Dubinsky. A demographic shift in ILGWU membership, from largely Jewish and Italian workers to more Hispanic and African-American workers, had begun under Dubinsky, but accelerated rapidly during Stulberg's term. During this period, the ILGWU focused more heavily on organizing, and membership reached an all-time high in 1968. But by 1970, it had begun to fall dramatically, as more clothing manufacturers moved their operations abroad. The union also shed many of its political connections under Stulberg's leadership. In 1968 he led the union out of the Liberal Party of New York State, which it had helped to found, and he severed the ILGWU's ties to the Americans for Democratic Action.

== Sources ==
Biography of Louis Stulberg

Trade union offices
Preceded by David Dubinsky	Secretary-Treasurer of the International Ladies' Garment Workers' Union; 1959–1973	Succeeded by Sol Chaikin
Preceded by David Dubinsky	President of the International Ladies' Garment Workers' Union; 1966–1975	Succeeded by Sol Chaikin
Preceded by Paul Jennings; John Griner	AFL-CIO delegate to the Trades Union Congress; 1972; With: Frederick O'Neal	Succeeded by Peter Bommarito; Martin Ward
