= John F. Griner =

American labor union leader

John F. Griner (August 7, 1907 – April 22, 1974) was an American labor union leader.

Born in Camilla, Georgia, Griner went to work on the railroads in 1925, and joined both the Order of Railroad Telegraphers and the American Train Dispatchers Association. Alongside this, he studied law at Columbus University. In 1936, he began working for the Railroad Retirement Board, rising to become its labor relations officer, and he joined the American Federation of Government Employees (AFGE). He served on its executive council for 16 years.

In 1962, Griner was elected as president of the AFGE. Under his leadership, the union's membership tripled to more than 300,000, becoming by far the largest union representing government employees. The union also voted to remove a no strike clause from its constitution, against Griner's wishes. In 1969, he was also elected as a vice-president of the AFL-CIO, and in 1971 he was the federation's delegate to the British Trades Union Congress. He retired in 1972, and died two years later.

Trade union offices
Preceded by James A. Campbell	President of the American Federation of Government Employees; 1962–1972	Succeeded by Clyde M. Webber
Preceded by I. W. Abel; Teddy Gleason	AFL-CIO delegate to the Trades Union Congress; 1971; With: Paul Jennings	Succeeded by Frederick O'Neal; Louis Stulberg
