= Peter Schoemann =

American labor union leader

Peter Theodore Schoemann (October 26, 1893 – August 7, 1976) was an American labor union leader.

Born in Milwaukee, Schoemann completed an apprenticeship as a plumber, and joined the United Association (UA) union in 1914. He was recording secretary and then business representative of his local, then in 1928 became chair of the union's credentials committee, serving until 1932. That year, he became president of the Milwaukee Building and Construction Trades Council, and was also appointed to the city's school board, serving in both posts for around 20 years. During World War II, he served on the regional War Manpower Commission.

Schoemann served as a vice-president of the UA for several years. In 1953, the union's president, Martin Patrick Durkin, was appointed as United States Secretary of Labor, and Schoemann succeeded as president; however, Durkin returned to the post later in the year. Durkin died in 1955, and Schoemann was then re-elected to the post. As leader of the union, he signed an agreement to construct low-cost prefabricated housing.

In 1957, Schoemann was additionally elected as a vice-president of the AFL-CIO, and he chaired the federation's education committee. He retired from his union posts in 1971, and died five years later.

Trade union offices
Preceded by Martin Patrick Durkin	President of the United Association; 1953	Succeeded by Martin Patrick Durkin
Preceded by Martin Patrick Durkin	President of the United Association; 1955–1971	Succeeded by Martin Ward
