= Martin Patrick Durkin =

American politician

Martin Durkin
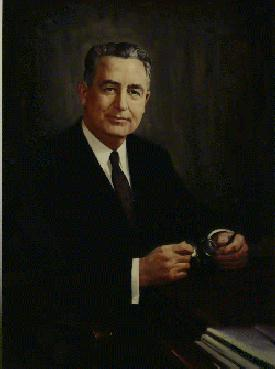

7th United States Secretary of Labor
- In office January 21, 1953 – September 10, 1953
- President: Dwight D. Eisenhower
- Preceded by: Maurice J. Tobin
- Succeeded by: James P. Mitchell

Illinois Director of Labor
- In office September 1, 1933 – September 29, 1941
- Governor: Henry Horner; Dwight H. Green
- Preceded by: Barney Cohen
- Succeeded by: Francis B. Murphy

Personal details
- Born: March 18, 1894 Chicago, Illinois, U.S.
- Died: November 13, 1955 (aged 61) Washington, D.C., U.S.
- Party: Democratic
- Spouse: Anna McNicholas
- Children: 3

Martin Patrick Durkin (March 18, 1894 – November 13, 1955) was a U.S. administrator. He served as secretary of labor from January 21, 1953, to September 10, 1953, where he was the "plumber" of President Dwight Eisenhower's "Nine Millionaires and a Plumber" cabinet.

== Biography ==
Durkin was born in Chicago, Illinois, on March 18, 1894, the son of James J. Durkin and Mary Catherine (née Higgins). At the age of 17, Durkin became involved in the plumbers' and pipe fitters' union. On August 29, 1921, Durkin married the former Anna H. McNicholas. They had three sons: Martin Bernard, William Joseph and John Francis Durkin.

He eventually became president of that union. He then served as Illinois's Director of Labor starting in September 1933, being appointed by Governor Henry Horner. He worked closely with the President Franklin D. Roosevelt's Secretary of Labor, Frances Perkins during this time. He resigned in September of 1941.

Durkin served as the secretary of labor during the Eisenhower administration. A Democrat among Republicans, he unsuccessfully pushed for his revisions in the Taft-Hartley Act. This led to his resignation after less than eight months in office, the shortest tenure of any secretary of labor.

He died in Washington D.C., from complications of cancer surgery. He was interred in St. Mary Catholic Cemetery in Evergreen Park, Illinois.

== See also ==
- List of U.S. political appointments that crossed party lines

Political offices
Preceded by Maurice J. Tobin	U.S. Secretary of Labor; Served under: Dwight D. Eisenhower; January 21–September 10, 1953	Succeeded by James P. Mitchell
Trade union offices
Preceded by George Masterton	President of the United Association; 1943–1953	Succeeded by Peter Schoemann
Preceded by Peter Schoemann	President of the United Association; 1953–1955	Succeeded by Peter Schoemann
