= United Association =

North American labor union

- United Association of Journeymen and Apprentices of the Plumbing and Pipe Fitting Industry of the United States and Canada
- Abbreviation: UA
- Formation: October 11, 1889; 137 years ago
- Type: Trade union
- Headquarters: Annapolis, Maryland, US
- Locations: Canada; United States
- Members: 392,000 (2014)
- President: Mark McManus
- Affiliations: AFL–CIO (North America's Building Trades Unions); Canadian Labour Congress
- Website: ua.org

The United Association of Journeymen and Apprentices of the Plumbing and Pipe Fitting Industry of the United States and Canada, commonly known as the United Association (UA), is a labor union which represents workers in the plumbing and pipefitting industries in the United States and Canada.

== History ==
Journeymen in the pipe trades in the 1880s worked in three basic crafts: plumbers, steamfitters and gasfitters.

The first truly successful national body, the United Association of Journeymen Plumbers, Gas Fitters, Steam Fitters, and Steam Fitters' Helpers of the United States and Canada, was officially founded on October 11, 1889.

Gradually, former members of rival unions joined the United Association. The depression of 1893–1897 slowed the development of a stronger organization. Membership in the United Association grew to 6,700 in 1893, but fell to 4,400 by 1897. Yet, by that year 151 local unions were listed on its rolls.

Starting in 1898, the construction industry entered a period of expansion and prosperity that lasted until 1914. From 1898 to 1906 the United Association quadrupled its membership.

During its first years, the United Association was essentially a federation of local unions, rather than a truly national union of the pipe trades. The major breakthrough toward a unified national organization came at the 1902 national convention in Omaha, when delegates approved a Nationalization Committee proposal establishing a comprehensive system of sick, death and strike benefits.

As such reforms to strengthen the national organization were being made in the early part of the century, however, some locals broke ranks to form a rival union. In August 1906, members of the secessionist union realized the futility of further rivalry and agreed to affiliate with the United Association.

From 1898 to 1914, the United Association went through several phases of a struggle with the International Association of Steam and Hot Water Fitters and Helpers, a prolonged and sometimes bitter dispute both over jurisdiction over a craft (steamfitting) and work assignments (plumbers vs. steamfitters). The conflict affected other building trades when walkouts by the rival steamfitting organizations, as a result of their jurisdictional dispute, led to work stoppages by other crafts.

The strength of the United Association, and favorable rulings by the American Federation of Labor, including the revocation of the International Association's charter in 1912, ended this jurisdictional battle, but other jurisdictional issues would continue to challenge the union.

New disputes arose over the construction of chemical plants and other manufacturing and service establishments that required extensive piping systems. Large volumes of newer types of pipefitting installation in the shift from World War I wartime industries to peacetime construction caused considerable difficulties. Jurisdictional problems also developed with other national unions, but the United Association retained jurisdiction over important, growing areas of work like construction of industrial plants, public utilities, petroleum facilities and residential buildings.

In the first half of the century, the United Association moved to formalize apprenticeship training programs, including making a five-year apprenticeship mandatory in 1921, and in 1938 holding that all apprentices be members of the United Association and attend related training classes. Its National Plumbing Apprenticeship Plan of 1936 was the first set of standards governing apprenticeship to win approval of the federal government.

In the Depression, United Association membership fell from its 1929 peak of 60,000 to 26,000 by 1933.

After several constitutional changes through the years, the 1946 convention changed the name of the organization to its present name: The United Association of Journeymen and Apprentices of the Plumbing and Pipe Fitting Industry of the United States and Canada.

Throughout World War II and after, the United Association made considerable gains in membership and prestige. Between 1940 and 1954 membership surged from 60,000 to 240,000 with veterans entering the skilled craftsmen field.

United Association member George Meany was elected in 1952 to be president of the newly formed AFL-CIO and was to provide a shaping force in the American labor movement until his death in 1980.

The New Frontier of President John F. Kennedy and Great Society of President Lyndon Johnson were movements supported by the United Association. With expanded training programs beginning in 1956, the UA was able to meet the demands of accelerated construction activity in the 1960s. With the increased work the slogan, "There is no substitute for UA skilled craftsmen" became widespread throughout the industry. By 1971 the UA was 320,000 strong.

== Composition ==
According to UA's reports to the Department of Labor since 2000, the union has consistently had about 93 percent members in "building trades.", the remaining 7 percent in "metal trades." Out of the total membership, most are considered "journeymen", with about 12 percent considered "apprentices." As of January 1, 2017, fourth- and fifth-year apprentices are eligible to vote in the union.

=== Alabama ===
- LU 91 BIRMINGHAM AL
- LU 372 TUSCALOOSA AL
- LU 548 MONTGOMERY AL
- LU 119 MOBILE AL
- LU 52 MONTGOMERY AL
- LU 760 SHEFFIELD AL

=== Alaska ===
- LU 367 ANCHORAGE AK
- LU 375 FAIRBANKS AK
- LU 262 JUNEAU AK

=== Arizona ===
- LU 469 PHOENIX AZ

=== Arkansas ===
- LU 155 STATE OF ARKANSAS

=== California ===
- LU 460 BAKERSFIELD CA
- LU 114 SANTA BARBARA CA
- LU 761 BURBANK CA
- LU 467 SAN MATEO CA
- LU 62 MONTEREY-SANTA CRUZ CA
- LU 364 COLTON CA
- LU 342 OAKLAND CA
- LU 345 LOS ANGELES CA
- LU 246 FRESNO CA
- LU 250 LOS ANGELES CA
- LU 483 SAN FRANCISCO CA
- LU 78 LOS ANGELES CA
- LU 159 MARTINEZ CA
- LU 228 MARYSVILLE CA
- LU 442 STOCKTON CA
- LU 582 SANTA ANA CA
- LU 398 POMONA CA
- LU 447 SACRAMENTO CA
- LU 230 SAN DIEGO CA
- LU 38 SAN FRANCISCO CA
- LU 393 SAN JOSE CA
- LU 403 SAN LUIS OBISPO CA
- LU 343 VALLEJO-NAPA CA
- LU 355 BURLINGAME CA
- LU 484 VENTURA CA
- LU 709 LOS ANGELES CA

=== Colorado ===
- LU 3 DENVER CO
- LU 58 COLORADO SPRINGS CO
- LU 208 DENVER CO
- LU 145 GRAND JUNCTION CO

=== Connecticut ===
- LU 777 STATE OF CONNECTICUT

=== Delaware ===
- LU 74 WILMINGTON DE

=== Florida ===
- LU 295 DAYTONA BEACH FL
- LU 123 TAMPA FL
- LU 719 BROWARD COUNTY FL
- LU 519 MIAMI FL
- LU 234 JACKSONVILLE FL
- LU 725 MIAMI FL
- LU 803 ORLANDO FL
- LU 630 WEST PALM BEACH FL
- LU 821 STATE OF FLORIDA

=== Georgia ===
- LU 72 ATLANTA GA
- LU 150 AUGUSTA GA
- LU 177 BRUNSWICK GA
- LU 473 JESUP GA
- LU 188 SAVANNAH GA

=== Hawaii ===
- LU 675 HONOLULU HI
- LU 811 HONOLULU HI

=== Idaho ===
- LU 296 BOISE ID
- LU 648 POCATELLO ID

=== Illinois ===
- LU 281 CHICAGO IL
- LU 101 BELLEVILLE IL
- LU 99 BLOOMINGTON IL
- LU 439 EAST ST LOUIS IL
- LU 653 CENTRALIA IL
- LU 130 CHICAGO IL
- LU 597 CHICAGO IL
- LU 360 EAST ST LOUIS IL
- LU 63 PEORIA IL
- LU 553 ALTON IL
- LU 160 CARBONDALE IL
- LU 353 PEORIA IL
- LU 25 ROCK ISLAND IL
- LU 23 ROCKFORD IL
- LU 149 CHAMPAIGN IL
- LU 137 SPRINGFIELD IL
- LU 551 HERRIN IL

=== Indiana ===
- LU 136 EVANSVILLE IN
- LU 166 FORT WAYNE IN
- LU 440 INDIANAPOLIS IN
- LU 210 HOBART IN
- LU 172 SOUTH BEND IN
- LU 157 TERRE HAUTE IN

=== Iowa ===
- LU 125 CEDAR RAPIDS IA
- LU 33 DES MOINES IA

=== Kansas ===
- LU 441 WICHITA KS

=== Kentucky ===
- LU 248 ASHLAND KY
- LU 452 LEXINGTON KY
- LU 502 LOUISVILLE KY
- LU 633 OWENSBORO KY
- LU 184 PADUCAH KY

=== Louisiana ===
- LU 247 ALEXANDRIA LA
- LU 198 BATON ROUGE LA
- LU 60 NEW ORLEANS LA
- LU 141 SHREVEPORT LA

=== Maine ===
- LU 716 STATE OF MAINE

=== Maryland ===
- LU 900 WASHINGTON DC
- LU 486 BALTIMORE MD
- LU 5 WASHINGTON DC
- LU 602 WASHINGTON DC
- LU 669 COLUMBIA MD
- LU 489 CUMBERLAND MD

=== Massachusetts ===
- LU 12 BOSTON MA
- LU 550 BOSTON MA
- LU 537 BOSTON MA
- LU 104 SPRINGFIELD MA
- LU 4 WORCESTER MA

=== Michigan ===
- LU 190 ANN ARBOR MI
- LU 174 WEST MICHIGAN
- LU 111 ESCANABA MI
- LU 636 DETROIT MI
- LU 370 FLINT MI
- LU 333 LANSING MI
- LU 98 DETROIT MI
- LU 671 MONROE MI
- LU 85 SAGINAW MI
- LU 357 KALAMAZOO MI
- LU 704 DETROIT MI

=== Minnesota ===
- LU 11 DULUTH MN
- LU 15 MINNEAPOLIS MN
- LU 340 MINNEAPOLIS MN
- LU 539 MINNEAPOLIS MN
- LU 6 ROCHESTER MN
- LU 417 MINNEAPOLIS MN
- LU 34 ST PAUL MN
- LU 455 ST PAUL MN
- LU 589 HIBBING MN

=== Mississippi ===
- LU 568 GULFPORT MS
- LU 436 PASCAGOULA MS
- LU 619 VICKSBURG MS

=== Missouri ===
- LU 562 ST LOUIS MO
- LU 8 KANSAS CITY MO
- LU 781 KANSAS CITY MO
- LU 314 KANSAS CITY MO
- LU 533 KANSAS CITY MO
- LU 178 SPRINGFIELD MO
- LU 45 ST JOSEPH MO
- LU 268 ST LOUIS MO

=== Montana ===
- LU 30 BILLINGS MT
- LU 41 BUTTE MT
- LU 459 MISSOULA MT

=== Nebraska ===
- LU 16 OMAHA NE
- LU 464 OMAHA NE

=== Nevada ===
- LU 525 LAS VEGAS NV
- LU 350 RENO NV

=== New Hampshire ===
- LU 131 CONCORD-MANCHESTER NH
- LU 788 PORTSMOUTH NH

=== New Jersey ===
- LU 9 CENTRAL NEW JERSEY
- LU 696 NEWARK NJ
- LU 274 JERSEY CITY NJ
- LU 855 JERSEY CITY NJ
- LU 475 NEWARK NJ
- LU 24 LODI NJ
- LU 322 SOUTHERN NEW JERSEY

=== New Mexico ===
- LU 412 ALBUQUERQUE NM

=== New York ===
- LU 112 BINGHAMTON NY
- LU 773 GLENS FALLS NY
- LU 7 ALBANY NY
- LU 1 NEW YORK NY
- LU 638 NEW YORK NY
- LU 373 ROCKLAND COUNTY NY
- LU 21 PEEKSKILL NY
- LU 15 ROCHESTER NY
- LU 200 NASSAU-SUFFOLK NY
- LU 128 SCHENECTADY NY
- LU 81 SYRACUSE NY
- LU 22 BUFFALO NY

=== North Dakota ===
- LU 300 NORTH & SOUTH DAKOTA

=== Ohio ===
- LU 219 AKRON OH
- LU 396 BOARDMAN OH
- LU 55 CLEVELAND OH
- LU 495 CAMBRIDGE OH
- LU 94 CANTON OH
- LU 392 CINCINNATI OH
- LU 120 CLEVELAND OH
- LU 189 COLUMBUS OH
- LU 162 DAYTON OH
- LU 776 LIMA OH
- LU 168 MARIETTA OH
- LU 50 TOLEDO OH
- LU 42 NORWALK OH
- LU 577 PORTSMOUTH OH
- LU 711 STATE OF OHIO

=== Oklahoma ===
- LU 344 OKLAHOMA CITY OK
- LU 430 TULSA OK
- LU 798 TULSA OK

=== Oregon ===
- LU 290 PORTLAND OR

=== Pennsylvania ===
- LU 27 PITTSBURGH PA
- LU 520 HARRISBURG PA
- LU 420 PHILADELPHIA PA
- LU 690 PHILADELPHIA PA
- LU 692 PHILADELPHIA PA
- LU 542 PITTSBURGH PA
- LU 449 PITTSBURGH PA
- LU 524 SCRANTON PA
- LU 600 READING PA
- LU 354 LATROBE PA

=== Rhode Island ===
- LU 51 PROVIDENCE RI

=== South Carolina ===
- LU 421 CHARLESTON SC

=== Tennessee ===
- LU 614 MEMPHIS TN
- LU 854 HENDERSON TN
- LU 43 CHATTANOOGA TN
- LU 538 JOHNSON CITY TN
- LU 102 KNOXVILLE TN
- LU 17 MEMPHIS TN
- LU 572 NASHVILLE TN
- LU 702 NASHVILLE TN
- LU 718 OAK RIDGE TN

=== Texas ===
- LU 286 AUSTIN TX
- LU 211 HOUSTON TX
- LU 146 FORT WORTH TX
- LU 68 HOUSTON TX
- LU 404 NORTHWEST TEXAS
- LU 100 DALLAS TX
- LU 142 SAN ANTONIO TX
- LU 529 WACO TX

=== Utah ===
- LU 140 SALT LAKE CITY UT

=== Vermont ===
- LU 693 BARRE VT

=== Virginia ===
- LU 851 HOPEWELL VA
- LU 110 NORFOLK VA
- LU 376 NORFOLK VA
- LU 10 RICHMOND VA
- LU 477 PORTSMOUTH VA
- LU 272 PORTSMOUTH VA

=== Washington ===
- LU 26 WESTERN WASHINGTON
- LU 598 PASCO WA
- LU 32 SEATTLE WA
- LU 699 SEATTLE WA
- LU 44 SPOKANE WA

=== West Virginia ===
- LU 625 CHARLESTON WV
- LU 521 HUNTINGTON WV
- LU 152 MORGANTOWN WV
- LU 565 PARKERSBURG WV
- LU 83 WHEELING WV

=== Wisconsin ===
- LU 400 APPLETON WI
- LU 118 RACINE WI
- LU 183 MILWAUKEE WI
- LU 75 MILWAUKEE WI
- LU 601 MILWAUKEE WI
- LU 434 CENTRAL & WESTERN WI

=== Wyoming ===
- LU 192 CHEYENNE WY
- 192 CHEYENNE WY

=== Alberta ===
- LU 496 CALGARY AB
- LU 488 EDMONTON AB

=== British Columbia ===
- LU 170 VANCOUVER BC
- LU 516 VANCOUVER BC
- LU 324 VICTORIA BC

=== Manitoba ===
- LU 254 WINNIPEG MB

=== New Brunswick ===
- LU 325 FREDERICTON NB
- LU 213 ST JOHN NB

=== Newfoundland and Labrador ===
- LU 740 ST JOHNS NL

=== Nova Scotia ===
- LU 56 HALIFAX NS
- LU 282 HALIFAX NS
- LU 682 SYDNEY NS

=== Ontario ===
- LU 401 EASTERN-CENTRAL ON
- LU 787 TORONTO ON
- LU 67 HAMILTON ON
- LU 853 TORONTO ON
- LU 71 OTTAWA/HULL ON
- LU 663 SARNIA ON
- LU 46 TORONTO ON
- LU 800 SUDBURY ON
- LU 628 THUNDER BAY ON
- LU 527 SOUTHWESTERN ONTARIO

=== Prince Edward Island ===
- LU 721 CHARLOTTETOWN PE

=== Quebec ===
- LU 827 CORNWALL ON
- LU 500 CHICOUTIMI QC
- LU 292 MONTREAL QC
- LU 144 MONTREAL QC
- LU 608 MONTREAL QC

=== Saskatchewan ===
- LU 179 REGINA SK

=== Yukon ===
- LU 310 WHITEHORSE YT

== Constitution ==
"The objects of this Association are to protect its members from unjust and injurious competition, and secure through unity of action among all workers of the industry throughout the United States and Canada, claiming, as we do, that labor is capital, and is the only capital that possesses power to reproduce itself or in other words, to create capital. Labor is the interest underlying all other interests; therefore, it is entitled to and should receive from society and government protection and encouragement."

== Leadership ==
=== Presidents ===
1889: P. J. Quinlan
1892: Patrick H. Gleason
1896: William F. Redmond
1897: John J. Kelley
1901: William M. Merrick
1906: John R. Alpine
1919: John Coefield
1940: George Masterton
1943: Martin Patrick Durkin
1953: Peter Schoemann
1953: Martin Patrick Durkin
1955: Peter Schoemann
1971: Martin Ward
1982: Marvin J. Boede
1997: Martin Maddaloni
2004: William P. Hite
2016: Mark McManus

=== Secretary-Treasurers ===
1889: Richard A. O'Brien
1891: H. D. McGhan
1892: Martin Counahan
1897: William J. Spencer
1900: L. D. Tilden
1906: Thomas Dooley
1908: John Love
1909: Thomas E. Burke
1941: Martin Patrick Durkin
1943: Edward J. Hillock
1958: William C. O'Neill
1966: Martin Ward
1969: William T. Dodd
1972: Joseph A. Walsh
1985: Charlie Habig
1991: Marion A. Lee
1997: Michael A. Collins
1998: Thomas Patchell
2005: Pat Perno
2011: Mark McManus
2017: Patrick H. Kellett
2024: Derrick Kualapai

== General Reference ==
- United Association of Journeymen And Apprentices of The Plumbing And Pipe Fitting Industry of The United States and Canada Local 105 Records, 1893-1972. M.E. Grenander Department of Special Collections and Archives, University Libraries, University at Albany, State University of New York (hereafter referred to as the United Association of Journeymen And Apprentices of The Plumbing And Pipe Fitting Industry of The United States and Canada Local 105 Records).
