= Sol Chaikin =

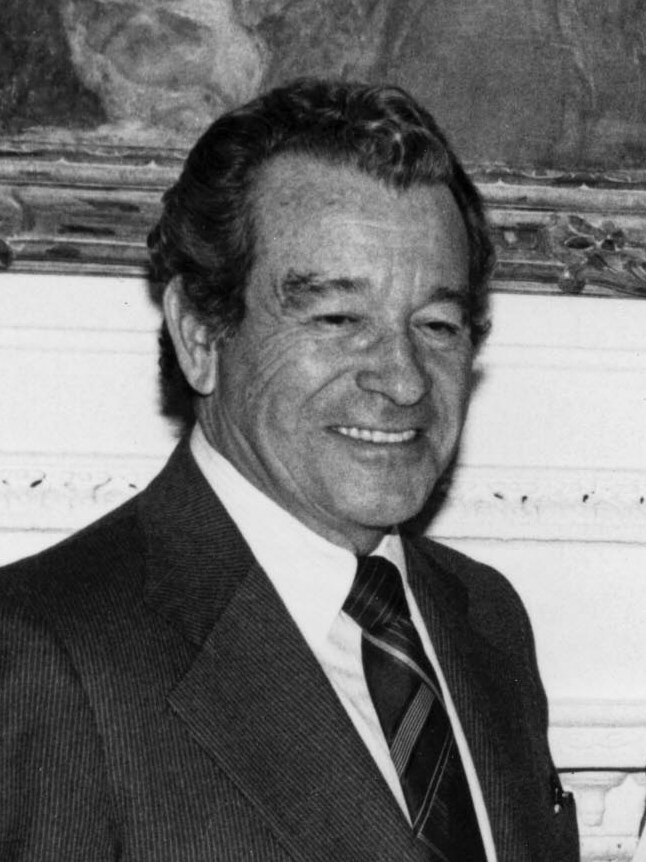

President of the International Ladies Garment Workers Union
- In office 1975–1986

Personal details
- Born: January 9, 1918
- Died: April 1, 1991 (aged 73)
- Education: Brooklyn Law School

Sol Chick Chaikin (9 January 1918 – 1 April 1991) was an American trade union organizer. He served as president of the International Ladies Garment Workers Union from 1975 until 1986.

He earned a law degree from Brooklyn Law School in 1940.

He was a Vice President of the AFL-CIO, and a member of its Executive Council and of its Trade and International Affairs Committees. He was also deputy member of the Executive Committee of the International Confederation of Free Trade Unions, and was a member of the U.S. delegation to the Belgrade and Madrid sessions of the Conference on Security and Cooperation in Europe.

In his later life, he was acting head of the Jacob K. Javits Convention Center.

The Sol C. Chaikin Professor of National Health Policy at the Florence Heller Graduate School for Social Policy, Brandeis University, is named in his honor.

Trade union offices
Preceded by Louis Stulberg	Secretary-Treasurer of the International Ladies' Garment Workers' Union; 1973–1975	Succeeded by Shelley Appleton
Preceded by Louis Stulberg	President of the International Ladies' Garment Workers' Union; 1975–1986	Succeeded by Jay Mazur
Preceded by Frederick O'Neal	AFL-CIO delegate to the Trades Union Congress; 1981	Succeeded by John Sweeney
