= Martin Ward (unionist) =

American labor union leader (1918–1982)

Martin Joseph Ward (September 25, 1918 – October 9, 1982) was an American labor union leader.

Born in Chicago, Ward attended the Washburne Trade School from 1937, studying plumbing, during which time, he joined the United Association (UA) union. Ward served in the military during World War II, then after the war became an apprentice instructor for his union local. From 1952, he was business manager of the local, then in 1958, he was elected as assistant secretary-treasurer of the international union. During this period, he also served as secretary of the Illinois Building Trades Association.

In 1966, Ward was elected as secretary-treasurer of the UA, becoming assistant to the president in 1969, and then president of the union in 1971. The following year, he was additionally elected as a vice-president of the AFL-CIO, and thereafter devoted much of his time to the federation. In particular, he was prominent in the federation's international affairs, in which he was a strong opponent of communism, and led negotiations for the federation to rejoin the International Confederation of Free Trade Unions. He was also an advisor to the U.S. workers' representative to the International Labour Organization.

Ward died in 1982, while still in office.

Trade union offices
| Preceded by William C. O'Neill | Secretary-Treasurer of the United Association; 1966–1969 | Succeeded by William T. Dodd |
| Preceded by Peter Schoemann | President of the United Association; 1971–1982 | Succeeded by Marvin J. Boede |
| Preceded by Frederick O'Neal; Louis Stulberg | AFL-CIO delegate to the Trades Union Congress; 1973; With: Peter Bommarito | Succeeded by Max Greenberg; James Housewright |
