= Martin Maddaloni =

American labour union leader

Martin J. Maddaloni
- Born: June 1939 (age 86); Philadelphia, United States
- Occupation(s): Pipefitter, manager and labor union leader
- Known for: Former president of the United Association labor union

Martin J. Maddaloni (born June 1939) is a former American labor union leader.

== Early life ==
Born in Philadelphia, Maddaloni completed an apprenticeship as a pipefitter, then was promoted to eventually run the mechanical department of Henkels & McCoy.

== Career ==
He joined the United Association union, and served as business manager of his local union for many years. In 1988, he was elected as a vice president of the union, then became a full-time international representative, before in 1996 winning election as the union's general president.

As leader of the union, Maddaloni focused on organizing more members, and maintaining high quality training programs. Maddaloni also served as a vice-president of the AFL-CIO from 1995.

=== Mismanagement ===
In 2004, Maddaloni and the union's secretary-treasurer Thomas H. Patchel were accused of mismanaging the union's finances. In particular, their decision to invest pension funds in a Florida hotel was questioned. The United States Department of Labor required them and two other trustees to resign from the union's pension fund, and pay $11 million in penalties. The union then bought both Maddaloni and Patchel out of their contracts, with the two resigning their posts, and in 2005 resigning from the union entirely.

Trade union offices
Preceded by Marvin Boede	President of the United Association; 1996–2004	Succeeded by William P. Hite
