= Marvin Boede =

American labor union leader

Marvin John Boede (April 6, 1928 – January 17, 2007) was an American labor union leader.

Born in Fond du Lac, Wisconsin, Boede served in Europe with the 11th Airborne Division during World War II. After the war, he studied at the Milwaukee School of Engineering, then completed an apprenticeship as a plumber, joining the United Association union. He worked in the industry, while also acting as an instructor for his union local's training program.

Boede held various positions in his local union, then in 1975 was elected as a full-time international representative, covering Michigan. In 1977, he won election as assistant general president of the union, and then in 1982 he was elected as the union's president. He also served on the executive council of the AFL-CIO.

Boede retired in 1996, becoming president emeritus of the union, and continuing to represent it on various regional construction industry bodies. He also served on the board of the Union Labor Life Insurance Company. He died of pancreatitis in 2007.

Trade union offices
Preceded by Martin Ward	President of the United Association; 1982–1996	Succeeded by Martin Maddaloni
