= Frederick O'Neal =

American actor and labor leader (1905–1992)

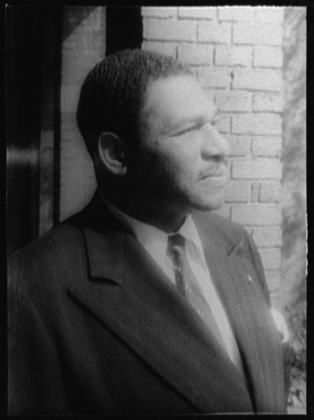
- O'Neal in 1958
- Born: Frederick Douglas O'Neal; August 27, 1905; Brooksville, Mississippi, U.S.
- Died: August 25, 1992 (aged 86); New York, New York, U.S.
- Occupations: Actor; Actors' Equity president; trade unionist
- Years active: 1927–1980

8th President of the Actors' Equity Association
- In office 1964–1973
- Preceded by: Ralph Bellamy
- Succeeded by: Theodore Bikel

Frederick O'Neal (August 27, 1905 – August 25, 1992) was an American actor, theater producer and television director. He founded the American Negro Theater, the British Negro Theatre, and was the first African-American president of the Actors' Equity Association. He was also known for his work behind the scenes as a revolutionary trade unionist.

== Early life and acting career ==
Born Frederick Douglas O'Neal in Brooksville, Mississippi, he was named after abolitionist Frederick Douglass. His father was a teacher and merchant. He had seven brothers and sisters. In 1919, when his father died, the family moved to St. Louis where he started acting professionally in 1927.

O'Neal moved to New York in 1936 and worked as a laboratory assistant while studying acting at night. He made his New York debut with the Civic Repertory Theatre. Unsatisfied with the state of black theater, he helped establish the American Negro Theater in 1940 and appeared in a number of its productions.

In 1944, he made his Broadway debut as the greedy brother-in-law in Anna Lucasta. For his performance, O'Neal won the Clarence Derwent Award as most promising newcomer of the theater season, the New York Drama Critics' Award for best supporting performance of 1944 and the Donaldson Award for the 1944-45 season. He recreated the role in Chicago and London, and in the film adaptation.

He also earned acclaim for his stage portrayal of Lem Scott in Take a Giant Step in 1953, and reprised the role on film. In films, O'Neal appeared in Pinky, No Way Out and Something of Value.

In 1953, O'Neal filmed a pilot for Sammy Davis Jr.'s ABC television show. The show presented African-Americans as struggling musicians, not the usual slapstick comedy or the stereotypical mammy roles of the time. The cast included actresses Ruth Attaway and Jane White, and Frances Davis who was the first black ballerina to perform for the Paris Opera. The network couldn't get a sponsor, so the show was dropped.

In 1955, O'Neal played the role of a detective in the mystery drama Danger. That year he portrayed a witch doctor in the Broadway musical House of Flowers.

On television, O'Neal was frequently on Kraft Suspense and Hallmark Hall of Fame productions. He also portrayed Officer Wallace on Car 54, Where Are You? from 1961 to 1963. In 1964 he played Matty Howard in a boxing-centered episode of the ABC drama Breaking Point titled "Never Trouble Trouble Till Trouble Troubles You" that boasted a primarily black cast, including Terry Carter, Diana Sands, Rex Ingram, and Mark Dymally.

He narrated, along with Hilda Simms, the educational record "Great Negro Americans" which was written and produced by Alan Sands (no relation to Diana).

== Organization and union work ==
In 1927, O'Neal organized the Aldridge Players in St. Louis, a black theater group named for Ira Aldridge. He helped organize Harlem's American Negro Theatre in 1940, which started the careers of Harry Belafonte, Ruby Dee, Sidney Poitier, Earle Hyman, and Alice Childress among others. In 1948, he co-founded the British Negro Theatre.

In 1958, O'Neal was named to Actors' Equity Association's council. He had lost the bid to become president, but six years later in 1964 he became president of the Actors' Equity Association. He was the first African-American president of Equity (1964–73). His work landed him on the master list of Nixon political opponents. After leaving office, he was named the organization's president emeritus.

O'Neal was elected president of the Associated Actors and Artistes of America in 1970 and retired from the position in 1988.

O'Neal was vice president of the AFL-CIO and a member of its executive council.

== Honors ==
O'Neal was inducted into the Black Film Makers Hall of Fame in 1975. The organization paid a special tribute to him in 1990.

The NAACP named him 1979 Man of the Year. He was also honored by the National Urban League and the Black Heritage Association.

O'Neal received several honorary degrees, including an Honorary Doctor of Human Letters from St. John's University in 1981.

== Death ==
O'Neal died at the age of 86 in his home in Manhattan after a lengthy illness on August 25, 1992. He was survived by his wife Charlotte Talbot Hainey.

Trade union offices
Preceded by Paul Jennings; John Griner	AFL-CIO delegate to the Trades Union Congress; 1972; With: Louis Stulberg	Succeeded by Peter Bommarito; Martin Ward
Preceded by John H. Lyons Jr.	AFL-CIO delegate to the Trades Union Congress; 1980	Succeeded by Sol Chaikin
