= David Dubinsky =

Belarusian-born American labor leader

- דאוויד דובינסקי
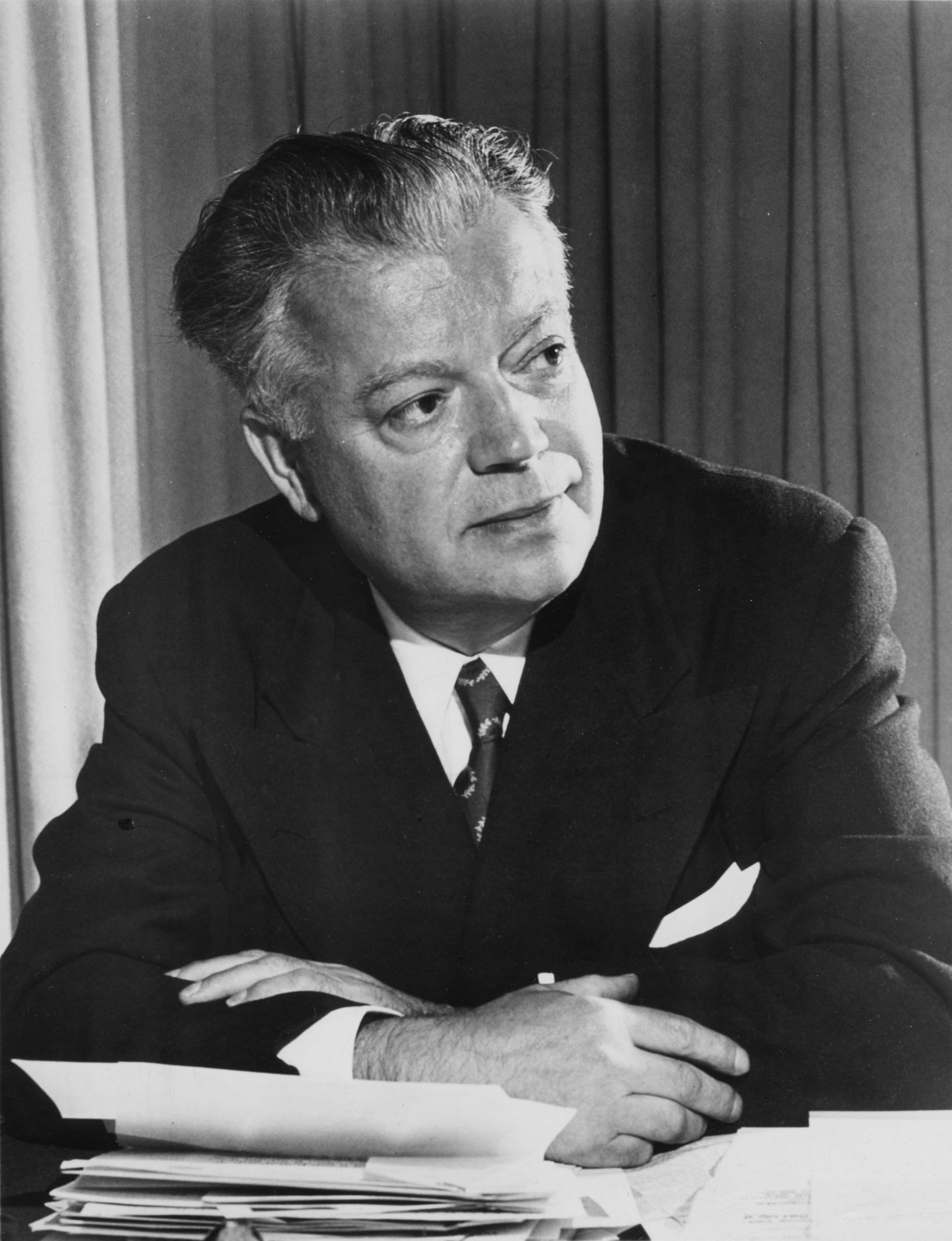
- Dubinsky c. 1934

President of the International Ladies Garment Workers Union
- In office June 16, 1932 – March 17, 1966
- Preceded by: Benjamin Schlesinger
- Succeeded by: Louis Stulberg

Secretary-Treasurer of the International Ladies Garment Workers Union
- In office December 11, 1929 – May 20, 1959
- Preceded by: Abraham Baroff
- Succeeded by: Louis Stulberg

Personal details
- Born: David Isaac Dobnievski; February 22, 1892 Brest, Russian Empire (now Belarus)
- Died: September 17, 1982 (aged 90) New York City, New York, U.S.
- Party: General Jewish Labor Bund (before 1911); Socialist Party of America (1910s–1920s); American Labor Party (1936–1944); Liberal Party of New York (after 1944)
- Awards: Presidential Medal of Freedom
- Nickname: "D.D."

David Dubinsky (Yiddish: דאוויד דובינסקי; born David Isaac Dobnievski; February 22, 1892 – September 17, 1982) was a Belarusian-born American labor leader and politician. He served as president of the International Ladies Garment Workers Union (ILGWU) between 1932 and 1966, took part in the creation of the CIO, and was one of the founders of the American Labor Party and the Liberal Party of New York.

== Early life and career in Russia ==
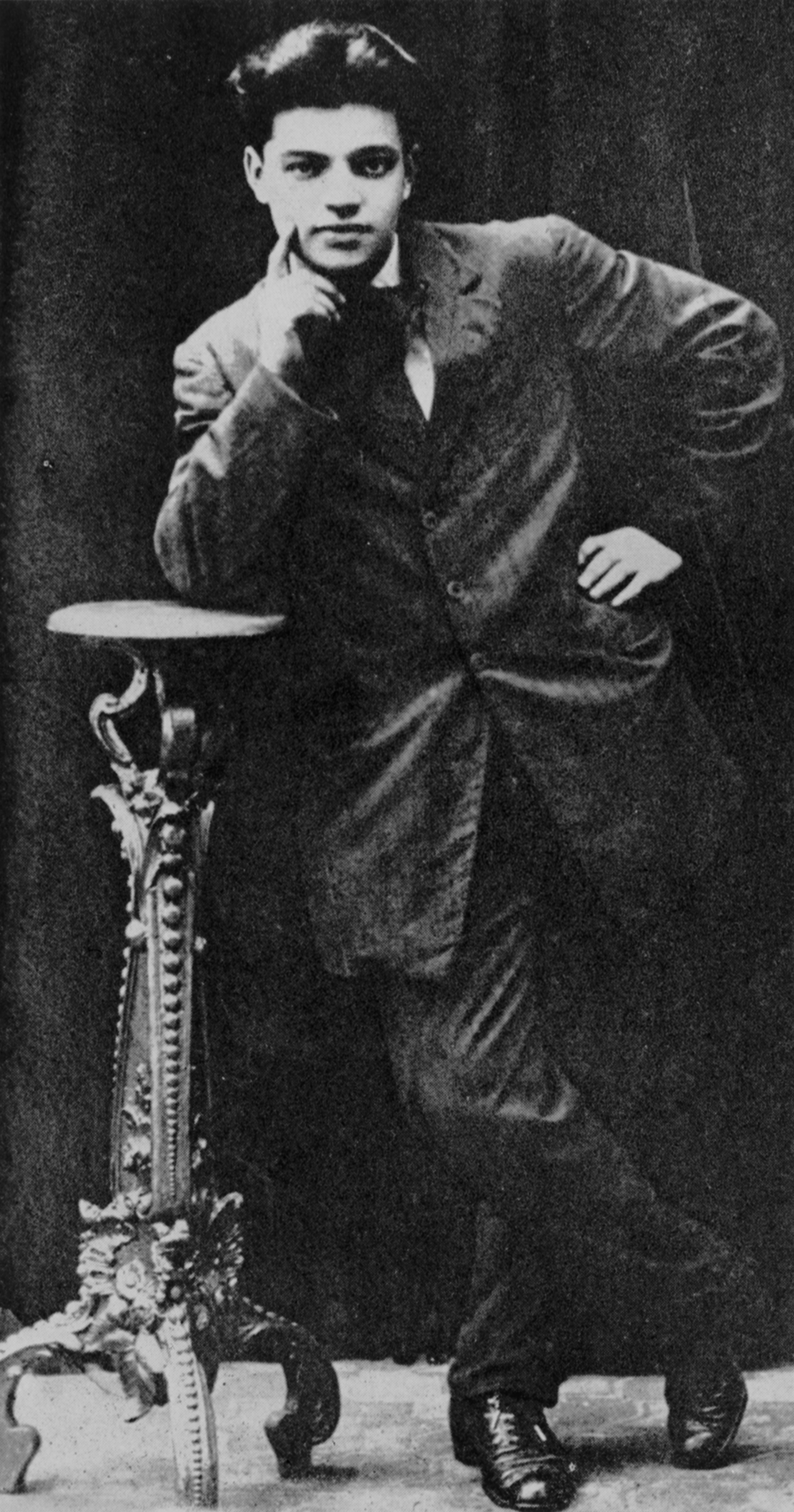
Dubinsky as a young man in Lodz, Poland, c. 1900s

David Isaac Dobnievski was born February 22, 1892, in Brest, in what was then the Russian Empire (and is now Belarus), as the youngest of five boys and three girls. Dubinsky and his family moved to Łódź, Poland, shortly before he turned three. David's father, Bezalel Dobnievski, a religious Jew, owned a bakery, but limited himself to administrative tasks related to the enterprise. David's mother Shaina Wyshengrad died when he was eight, with his father remarrying a year and a half later. David worked from early childhood delivering bread from his father's bakery to local shops, while attending a Hebrew school, where he studied Polish, Russian, and Yiddish. He was later forced to leave a semi-private school he attended to take work in his father's bakery to replace a brother who had left abruptly.

=== Early union activity, arrest, and emigration to United States ===
During the 1905 Russian Revolution, Dubinsky attended a mass meeting which led to his kinship, if not actual membership, with the General Jewish Labor Bund, a Jewish socialist labor organization. He joined the bakers' union, which was controlled by the Bund, and owing to his superior education and fluency in several languages, was elected assistant secretary within the union by 1906. By age 15, he was leader of the local labor union.

In 1906 or 1907, Dubinsky was arrested by the Okhrana, and was held for 18 months in prison before being sentenced to hard labor in Chelyabinsk, Siberia upon reaching the age of 16. On the way to Chelyabinsk, however, he escaped containment and fled to the United States, landing in New York City in 1911, at the age of 19.

== Early career in the United States ==
=== Joining the ILGWU ===
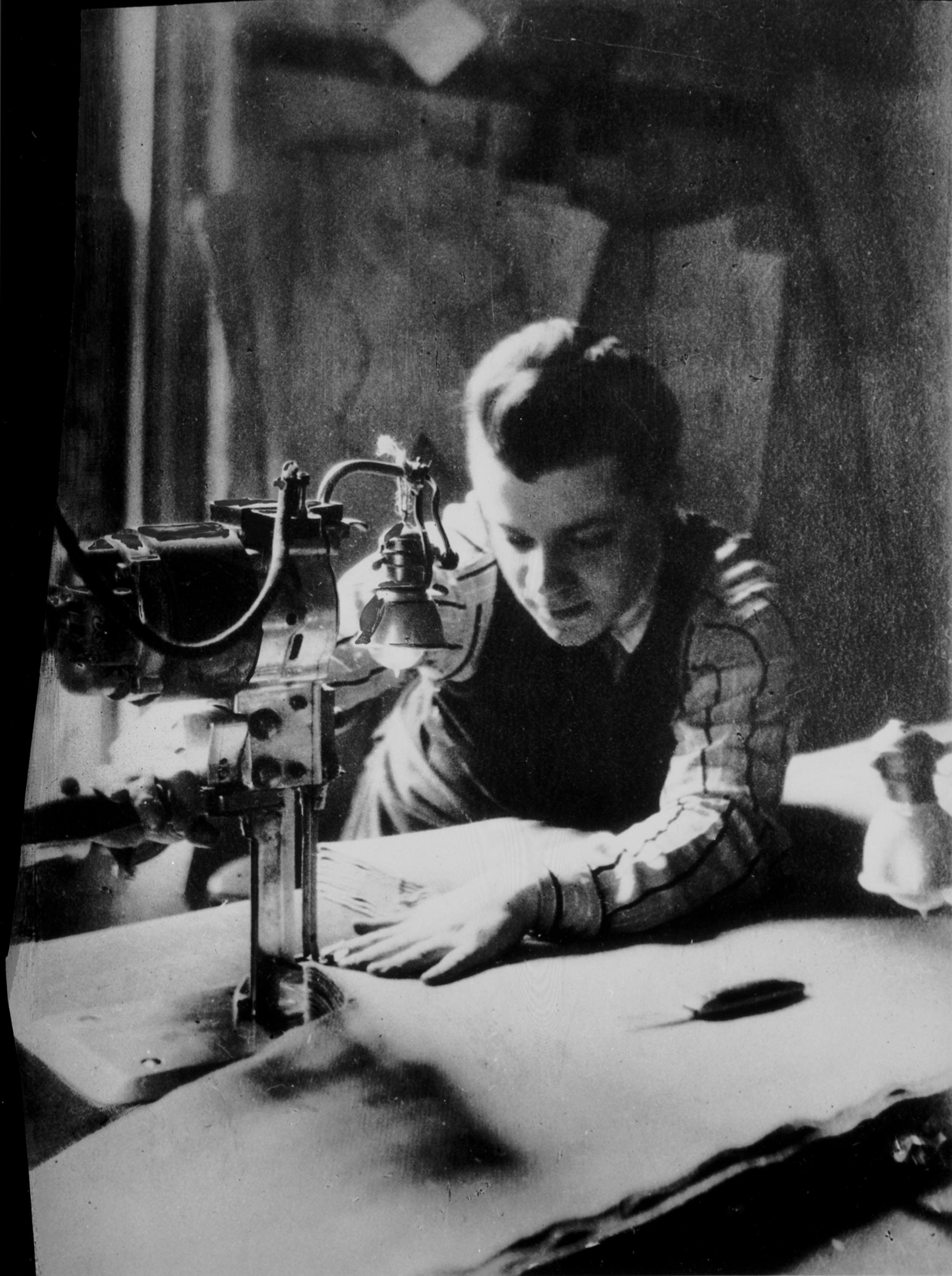
A young Dubinsky cutting fabric c. 1910s

When Dubinsky came to the United States in 1911, he began by working as a dishwasher. He quickly rose to become a sewing machine operator, but ignored requests from relatives that he pursue a career in the medical industry, and did not join his brother as a baker. Instead of these tasks, Dubinsky continued in the garments trade alongside tens of thousands of other Jewish workers, and became a member of Local 10, the ILGWU's cutter's union.

Within the ILGWU, Dubinsky's rise was swift, and he became president and general manager of Local 10 by 1921. The next year, he became a member of the ILGWU's General Executive Board, before becoming General Secretary-Treasurer in 1929.

=== Battles with the left ===
Shortly after Dubinsky was elected to the International Executive Board Benjamin Schlesinger, the International's president, resigned. Dubinsky campaigned hard for election of Morris Sigman, a former Industrial Workers of the World (IWW) member who took office in 1923. Sigman began to remove Communist Party USA members from leadership of locals in New York, Chicago, Philadelphia and Boston. Dubinsky supported Sigman's campaign.

Sigman could not, however, regain control of the New York locals, including Dressmakers' Local 22 and Cloak Finishers Local 9, where the Communist Party leadership and their left wing allies, some anarchists and some socialists, enjoyed strong support of the membership. Dubinsky, by his own account, thought that Sigman was too rash and appears to have urged him to call a truce after the left wing-led unions led a campaign to reject a proposed agreement that Sigman had negotiated with the industry in 1925, bringing more than 30,000 members to a rally at Yankee Stadium to call for a one-day stoppage on August 10, 1925.

The left wing won control of the New York Joint Board, the body that coordinated the activities of all of the New York City ILGWU locals in all aspects of the industry, that year. When it called a general strike on July 1, 1926, Dubinsky was given a nominal role in the strike, reflecting his power base in the cutters' union, but was largely sidelined. That strike was a disastrous failure, leading to the rout of leftist leadership from the Joint Board and ultimately from the industry, other than the independent International Fur Workers Union.

== Leadership of the ILGWU ==
=== Rise to power ===
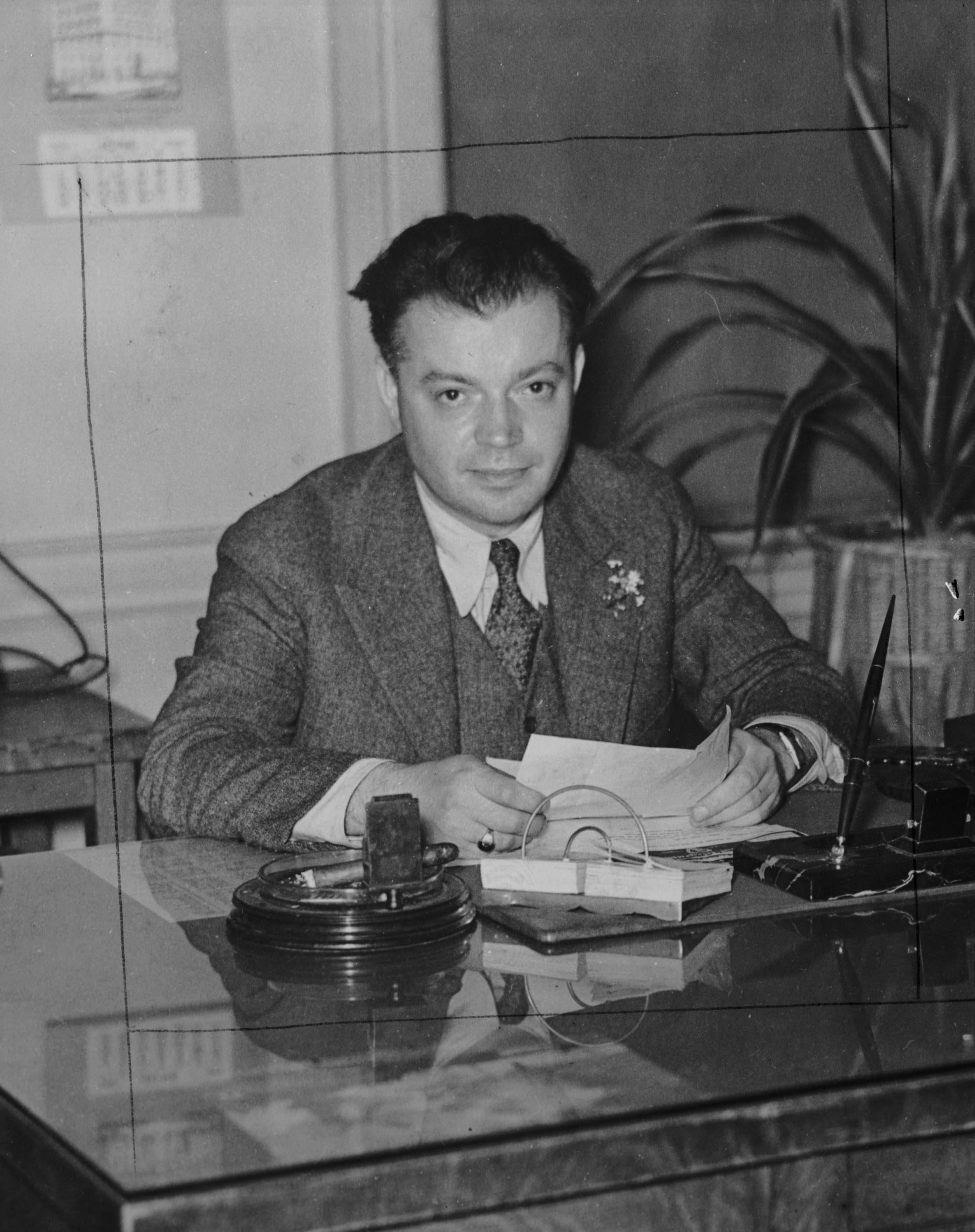
Portrait of Dubinsky at his desk upon assuming the office of ILGWU president

Dubinsky was somewhat disenchanted with Sigman's leadership by this point; while he was a wholehearted supporter of Sigman's attack on the Communist influence within the union, he thought that Sigman was too abrasive, alienating the right wing almost reflexively, given his dislike of "union bureaucrats" gained through his years in the Industrial Workers of the World (IWW). At the 1928 convention of the ILGWU he first proposed that Sigman resign in favor of Schlesinger – a suggestion seen by many as part of a plan by Dubinsky to become the eventual head of the union. Dubinsky denied any personal ambitions and rebuffed a proposal from Abraham Cahan of The Forward to promote him as Sigman's heir apparent.

When Morris Hillquit, the union's long-time counsel, advanced a proposal to create a new position of Executive Vice-president, which Schlesinger would hold, giving up his position as General Manager of the Forward, Sigman agreed. Five months later, after the union's executive board rejected an attempt by Sigman to merge two unions, Sigman resigned and Schlesinger returned to office.

By that point, however, the union was in a shambles, still struggling with the huge debts acquired during the failed strike, fighting expelled local leaders, some of whom had taken their unions out of the ILG, and facing an even more disorganized and piratical industry. Dubinsky set out to rebuild the ILGWU's base in New York City by striking a deal with the major manufacturers' group in 1929 that provided no pay raises but made it possible for the union to police the contract by cracking down on subcontractors who "chiseled", cheating workers out of pay or hours in order to gain a competitive advantage. The Communist Party USA opposed the new agreement but was by that time too weak to muster any effective resistance to Dubinsky.

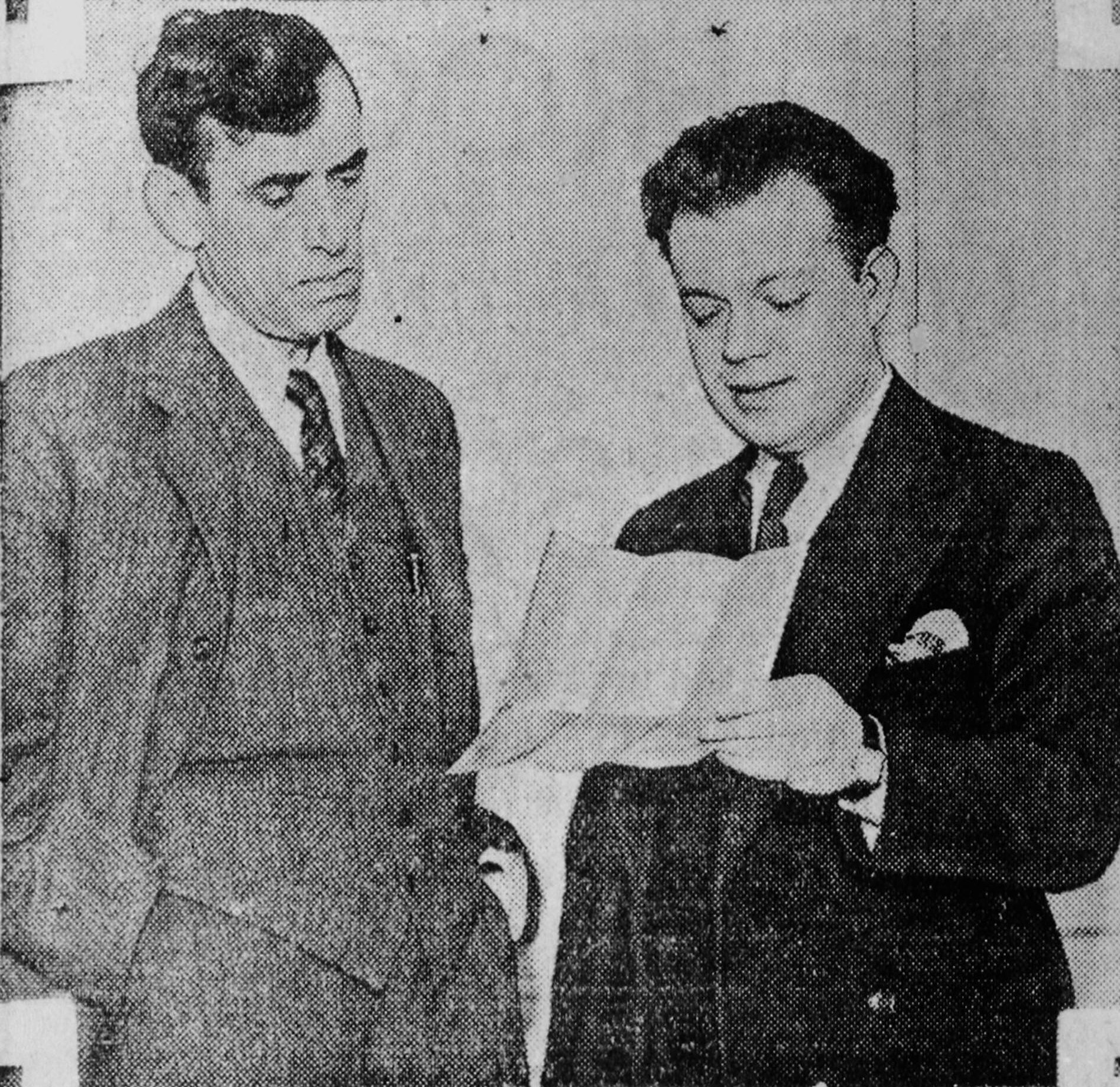
Dubinsky and Benjamin Schlesinger shortly before the latter's death

Dubinsky was elected Secretary-Treasurer of the ILGWU at the end of 1929. He was elected president after Schlesinger died in 1932, retaining the position of Secretary-Treasurer in order to avoid the sort of internecine battles that previous officers had waged in the past. He held the Presidency until 1966, while remaining Secretary-Treasurer until 1959.

Dubinsky proved to be far more durable than his predecessors. He did not brook dissent within the union and insisted that every employee of the International first submit an undated letter of resignation, to be used should Dubinsky choose to fire him later. He also acquired the power to appoint key officers throughout the union. As he explained his position at one of the union's conventions: "We have a democratic union – but they know who's boss."

Under his leadership the union, more than three fourths of whose members were women, continued to be led almost exclusively by men. Rose Pesotta, a longtime ILGWU activist and organizer, complained to Dubinsky that she had the same uncomfortable feeling of being the token woman on the ILGWU's executive board that Dubinsky had complained about when he was the only Jew on the AFL's board. The union did not, however, make any significant efforts to bring women into leadership positions during Dubinsky's tenure.

=== Organizing during the Great Depression ===
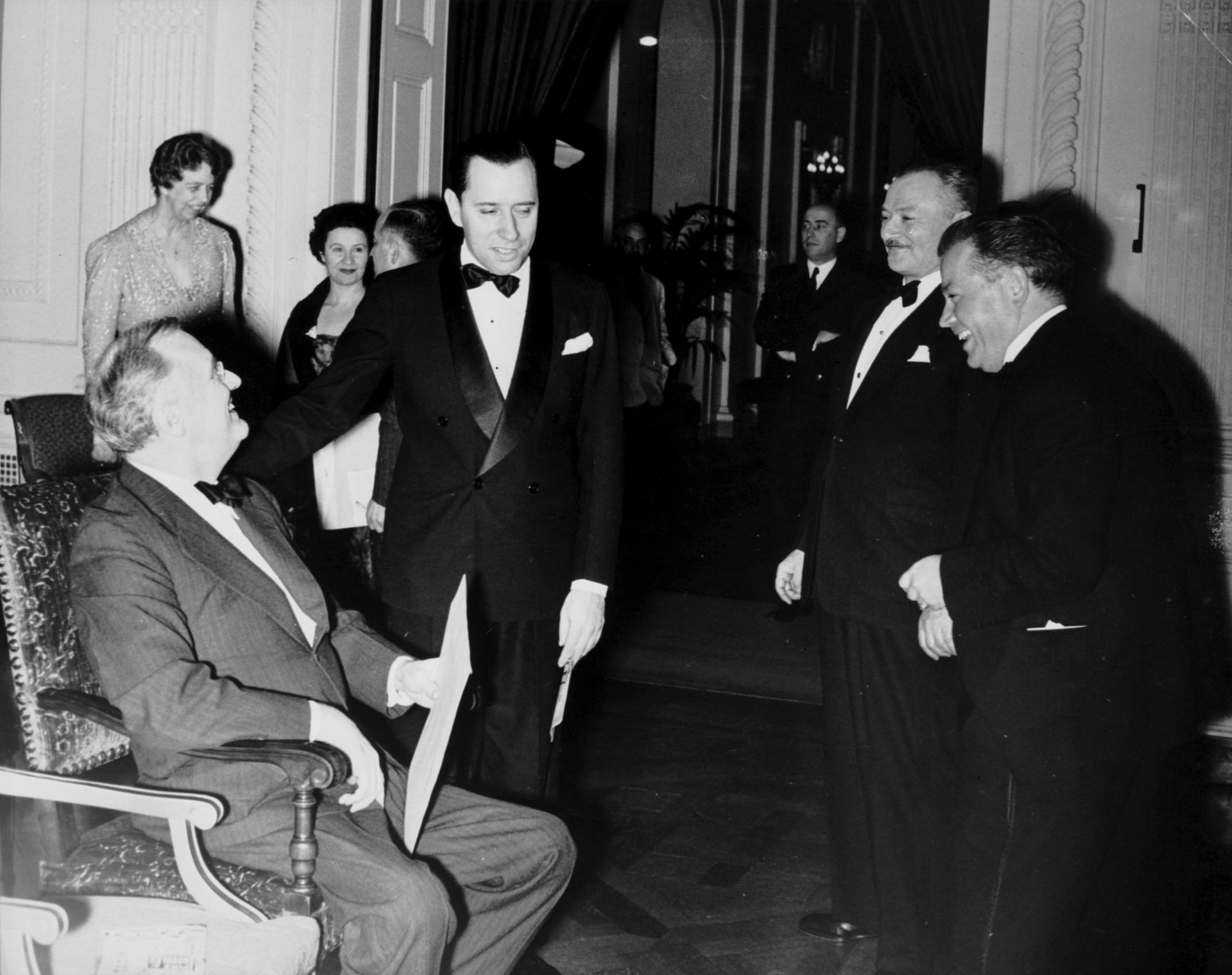
Dubinsky with Franklin D. Roosevelt, March 3, 1938

As weak as the ILGWU was in the aftermath of the 1926 strike, it was nearly destroyed by the Great Depression. Its dues-paying membership slipped to 25,000 in 1932 as unionized garment shops shut, abandoned unions, or stopped abiding by their union contracts.

The union recovered, however, after the election of Franklin D. Roosevelt and the passage of the National Industrial Recovery Act, which promised to protect workers' right to organize. As in the case in other industries with a history of organizing, that promise alone was enough to bring thousands of workers who had never been union members in the past to the union; when the union called a strike of dressmakers in New York on August 16, 1933, more than 70,000 workers joined in it – twice the number that the union had hoped for. It did not hurt, moreover, that the local leader of the NRA was quoted as saying – without any basis in fact – that President Roosevelt had authorized the strike. The union rebounded to more than 200,000 members by 1934, increasing to roughly 300,000 by the end of the Depression.

As one of the few industrial unions within the AFL, the ILGWU was eager to advance the cause of organizing employees in the steel, automobile and other mass production industries that employed millions of workers, many of them immigrants or children of immigrants, at low wages. The ILGWU was one of the original members of the Committee for Industrial Organization, the group that John L. Lewis of the United Mine Workers formed within the AFL in 1935 to organize industrial workers, and provided key financial support and assistance; Rose Pesotta played a key role in early organizing drives in the rubber and steel industries.

Dubinsky was unwilling, on the other hand, to split the AFL into two competing federations and did not follow Lewis and the Amalgamated Clothing Workers of America (ACWA) when they formed the Congress of Industrial Organizations as a rival to, rather than a part of, the AFL. Dubinsky also had personality differences with Lewis, whom he resented as high-handed.

In addition, Dubinsky was alarmed by the presence of Communist Party members on the payroll of the CIO and the fledgling unions it had sponsored. Dubinsky was opposed to any form of collaboration with communists and had offered financial support to Homer Martin, the controversial president of the United Auto Workers, who was being advised by Jay Lovestone, a former leader of the Communist Party turned anti-communist. Lewis, by contrast, was unconcerned with the number of communists working for the CIO; as he told Dubinsky, when asked about the communists on the staff of the United Steelworkers, "Who gets the bird? The hunter or the dog?"

The ILGWU began reducing its support for the CIO and, after a few years in which it attempted to be allies with both sides, reaffiliated with the AFL in 1940. Dubinsky regained his former positions as a vice president and member of the executive council of the AFL in 1945. He was the most visible supporter within the AFL of demands to clean house by ousting corrupt union leaders; the AFL-CIO ultimately adopted many of his demands when it established codes of conduct for its affiliates in 1957.

=== Electoral politics ===
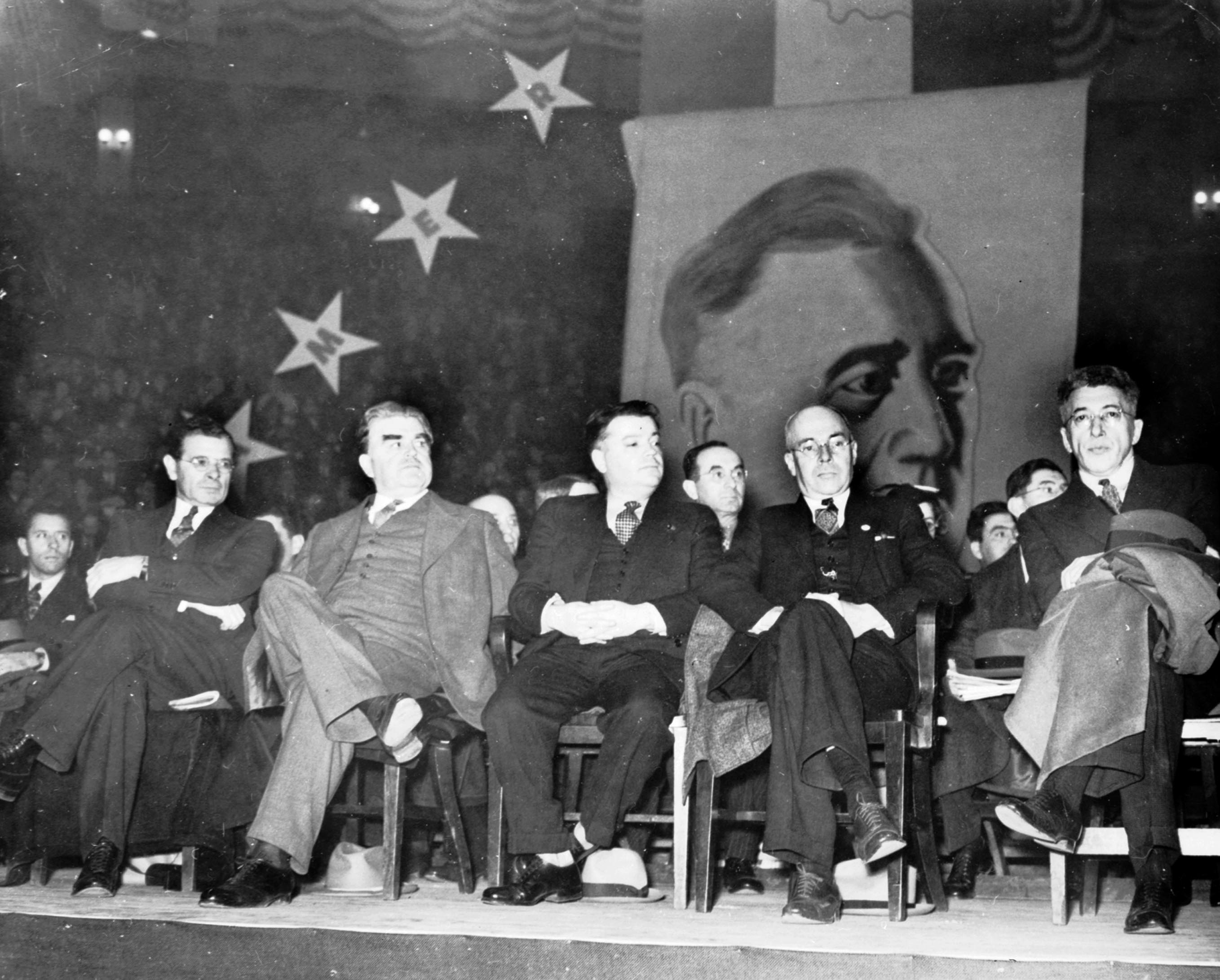
Sidney Hillman, John L. Lewis, Dubinsky, and Baruch Charney Vladeck at an American Labor Party rally

Dubinsky and Sidney Hillman, leader of the ACWA, helped found the American Labor Party in 1936. At the time Dubinsky and Hillman were both nominal members of the Socialist Party, although Dubinsky had, by his own admission, allowed his membership to lapse during the factional fighting of the 1920s. The Labor Party served as a halfway house for socialists and other leftists who were willing to vote for liberal Democratic politicians such as Roosevelt or Governor Herbert Lehman of New York, but who were not prepared to join the Democratic Party itself.

The new party was subject to many of the same fissures that divided much of the left in the late 1930s. For a while after the signing of the Molotov–Ribbentrop Pact, Communists within the ALP condemned Roosevelt as a warmonger because of his support for Britain. At one particularly stormy meeting Dubinsky and the other leaders were only able to hold their vote endorsing Roosevelt after moving from room to room and calling the police to arrest those who had disrupted the meeting.

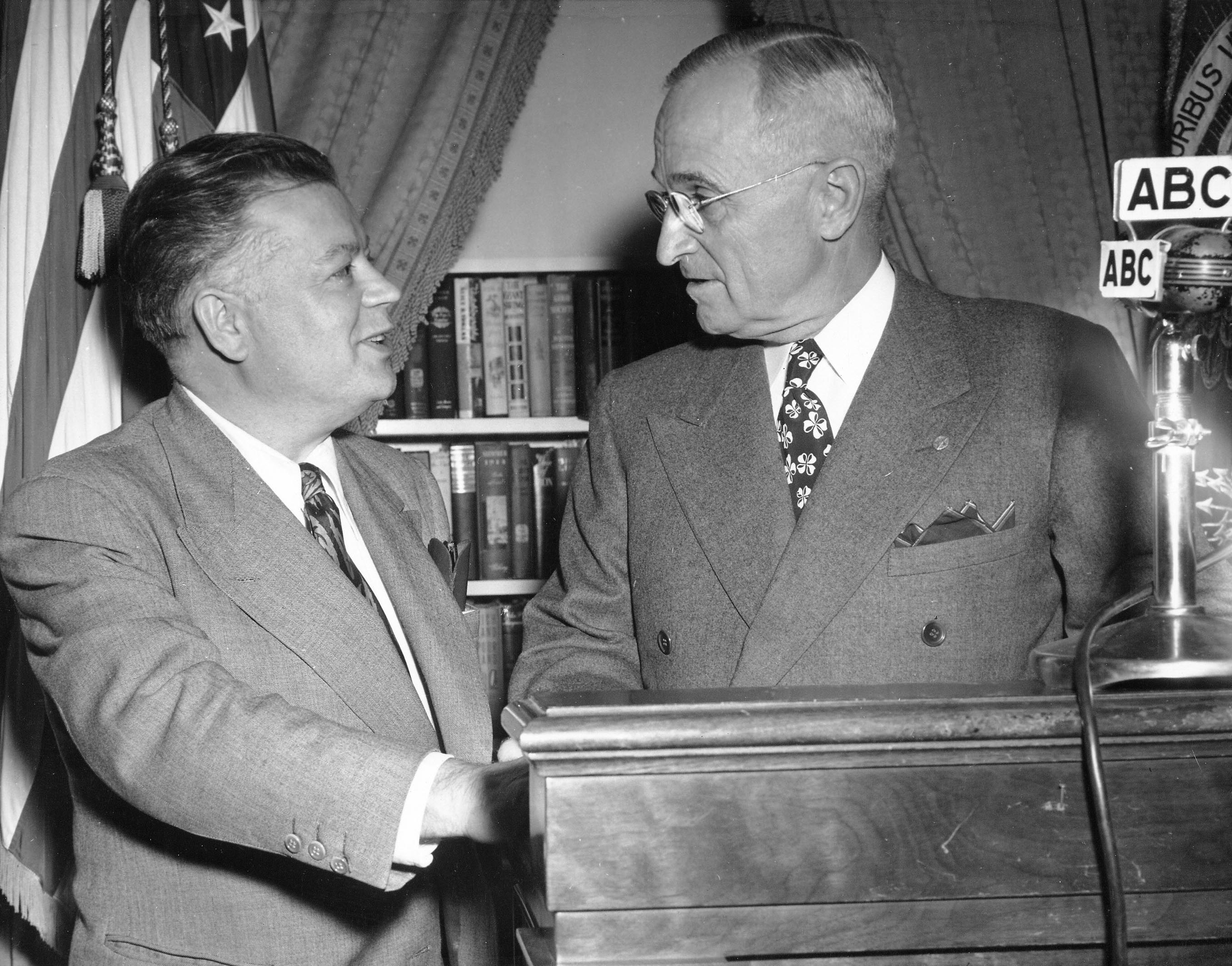
Dubinsky with Harry S. Truman

Dubinsky ultimately left the ALP in 1944 after a dispute with Hillman over whether labor leaders in New York, such as Mike Quill, who either were members of the Communist Party or were seen as sympathetic to it, should be given any role in the ALP. When Hillman prevailed, Dubinsky and his allies left to form the Liberal Party of New York. The ALP went on to endorse Henry Wallace in the 1948 presidential election, while the ILGWU campaigned energetically for Harry S. Truman, nearly bringing New York State into his column, despite it being the home state of the Republican nominee, Governor Thomas Dewey.

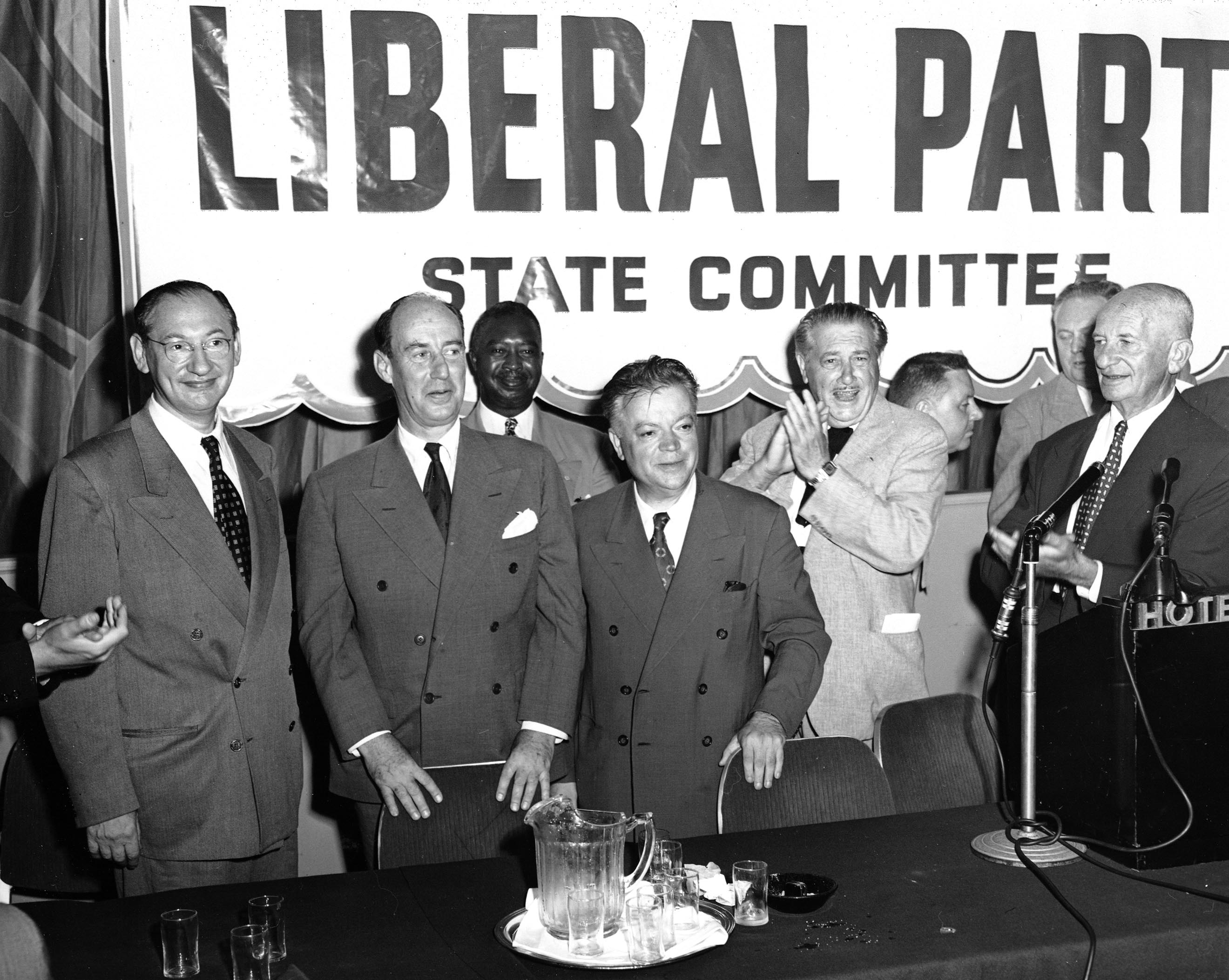
Liberal Party State Committee meeting with Adlai Stevenson, Dubinsky, Luigi Antonini, Alex Rose, and others

Dubinsky had hopes of launching a national liberal party, headed by Wendell Willkie, the Republican candidate for president in 1940 who had soured on the Republican Party after his defeat in the primaries in 1944. He proposed that Willkie begin by running for Mayor of New York City in 1945; Willkie, however, died before the plan could get off the ground.

Dubinsky and the ILGWU played an active role in the Liberal Party for most of the 1950s and up until his retirement in 1966. The ILGWU ended its support for the party after Dubinsky left office.

=== Post-war changes in the industry and the union ===
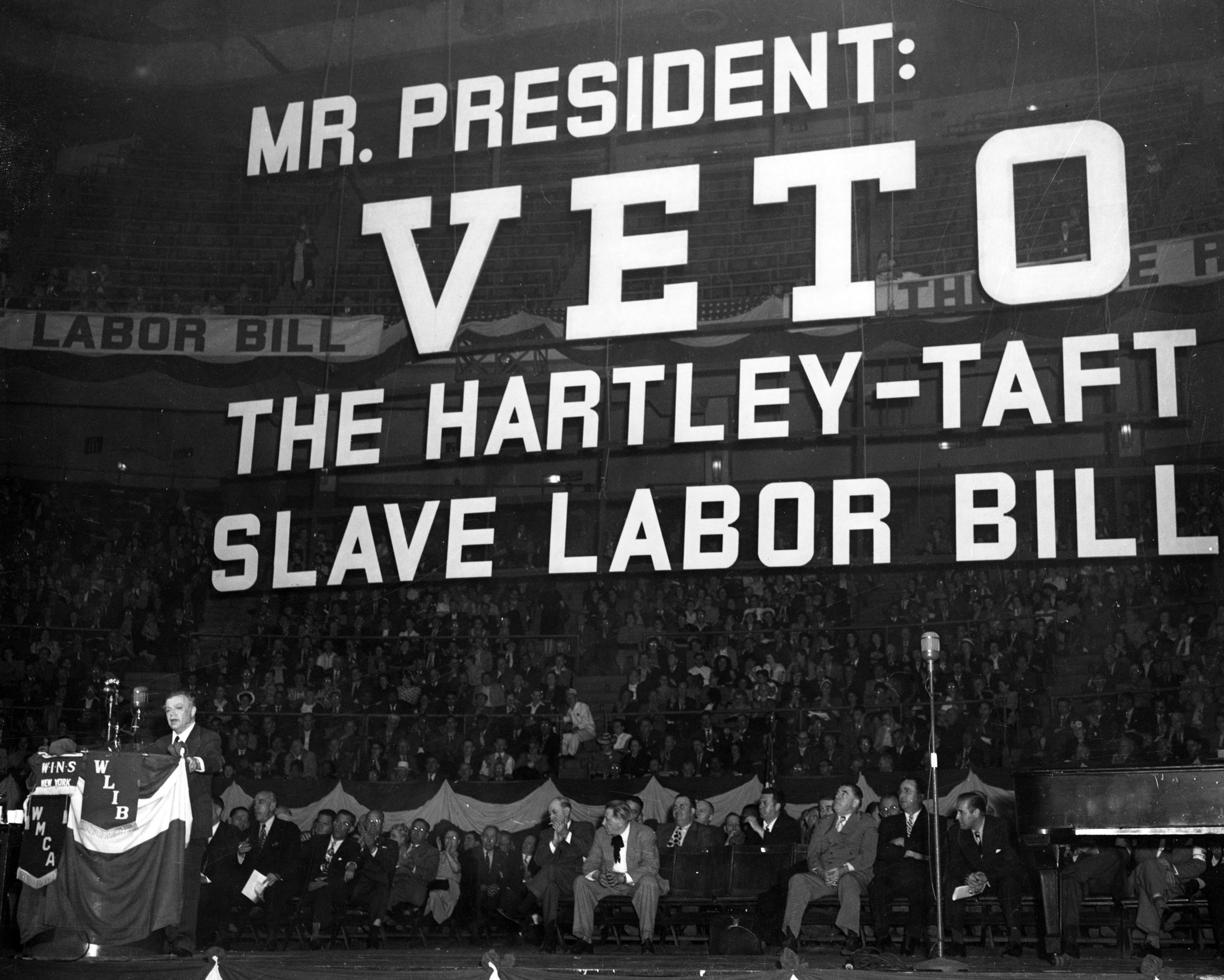
Dubinsky gives a speech against the Taft-Hartley Act, May 4, 1947

The union often saw itself, both before and during Dubinsky's years at the head of the union, as the savior of the industry, eliminating the cutthroat competition over wages that had made it unstable while making workers' lives miserable. Dubinsky took pride in negotiating a contract in 1929 that contained no raises, but allowed the union to crack down on subcontractors who "chiselled". Dubinsky even claimed to have once turned down an employer's wage offer in negotiations as too costly to the employers, and therefore harmful to employees. Dubinsky summarized his attitude by saying that "workers need capitalism the way a fish needs water."

Policing the industry became much harder, however, as gangsters invaded the garment district. Both the employers and the union had hired gangsters during the strikes of the 1920s. Some of them, such as Lepke Buchalter remained in the industry as labor racketeers who took over unions for the opportunities for raking off dues and extorting payoffs from employers with the threat of strikes. Some also became garment manufacturers themselves, driving away unions, other than those they controlled, by violence. While Dubinsky himself remained untouched by graft, a number of officers within the union were corrupted.

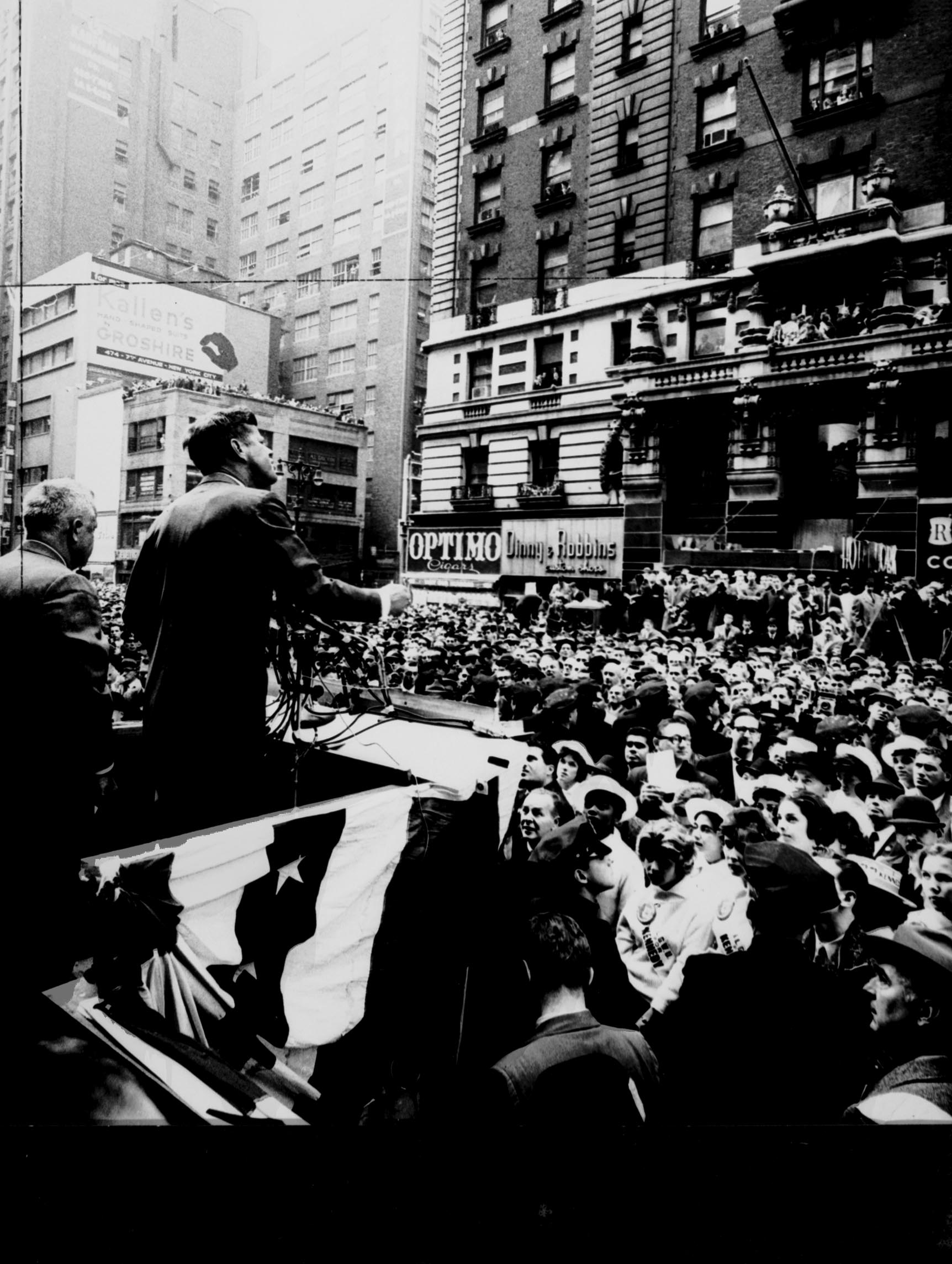
John F. Kennedy, at a street-side podium in New York, campaigns for ILGWU support with Dubinsky at his side

The industry changed greatly in the years after World War II; while it had once been concentrated in New York City and other eastern and Midwestern cities, with smaller outposts on the West Coast, the work done by formerly unionized shops fled to other parts of the US or abroad, where unions were non-existent and wages far lower. The ILGWU was unable to prevent these runaway shops or to organize workers at the new locations.

The union's membership also changed greatly in the years after World War II; what once had been a predominantly Jewish and Italian workforce became largely Latino, African-American and Asian. The leadership of the union had less and less in common with its membership and very often had no experience in the trade itself.

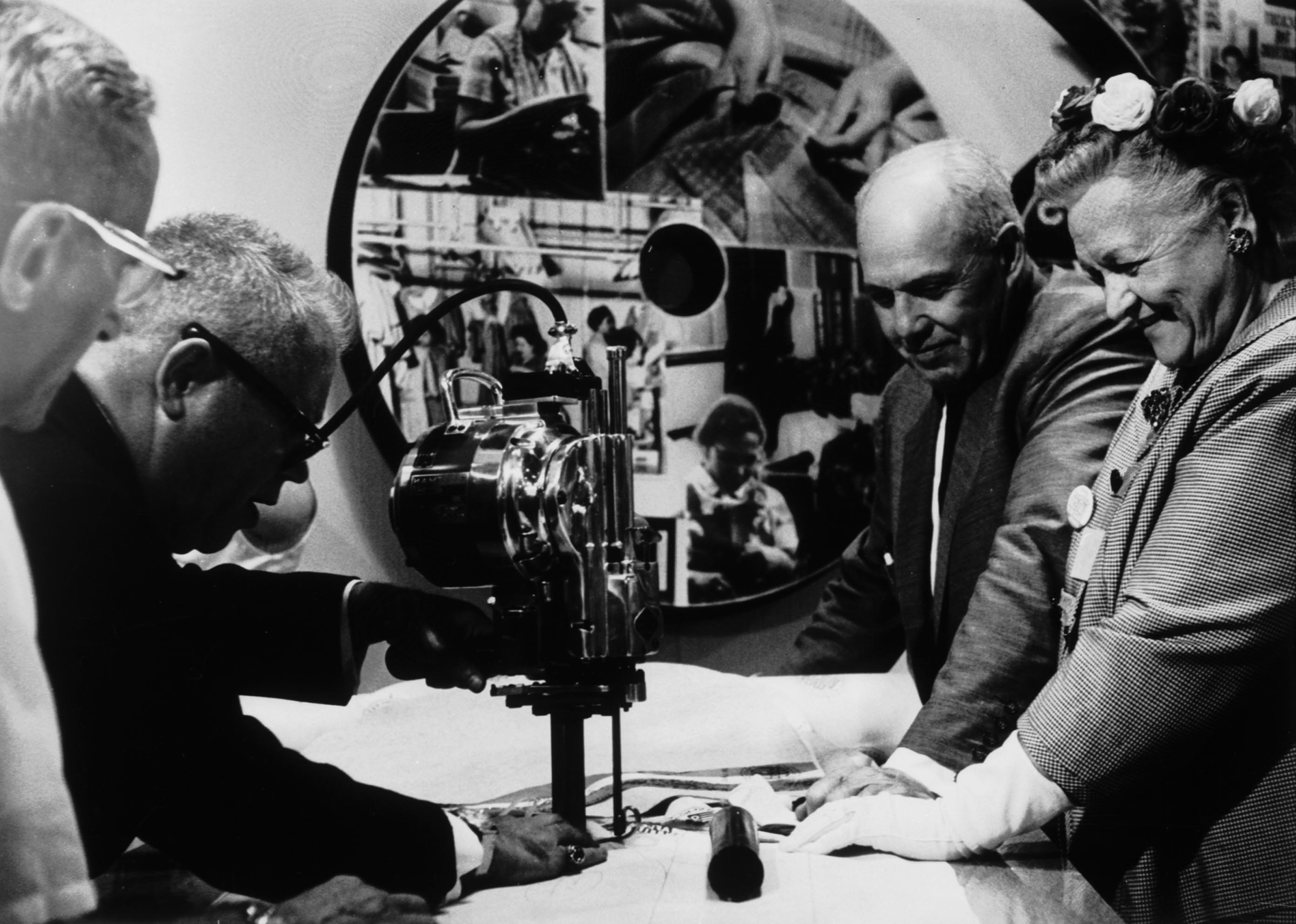
David Dubinsky demonstrates garment cutting for George Meany, Mrs. Meany, and others

In the last decade of Dubinsky's tenure some of these new members began to rebel, protesting their exclusion from positions of power within the union. That rebellion failed: the established leadership had too strong a hold on the official structure of the union, in an industry in which members were scattered across a number of small shops and in which power was concentrated in the upper echelons of the union, rather than in the locals. Without the support of a mass movement that would have given the majority an effective voice, individual insurgents were either marginalized or coopted.

The union continued to expand its membership after World War II, reaching its apex at 500,000 members in 1965, one year before Dubinsky's retirement. Dubinsky's focus on maintaining the stability of the industry and the union's place in it dampened the union's desire to gain significant wage increases for its members. The union gradually lost its ability to keep sweatshop conditions from returning, even in the former center of its strength in New York. While the union still had one-half million members in the years immediately after Dubinsky's retirement, the forces that brought about the decline and eventual disappearance of the ILGWU thirty years later, when it merged with the ACWA to form the union known as the Union of Needletrades, Industrial and Textile Employees (UNITE), were already at work. In his last years, Dubinsky was often accessible to the union's members.

== Retirement, death, and legacy ==
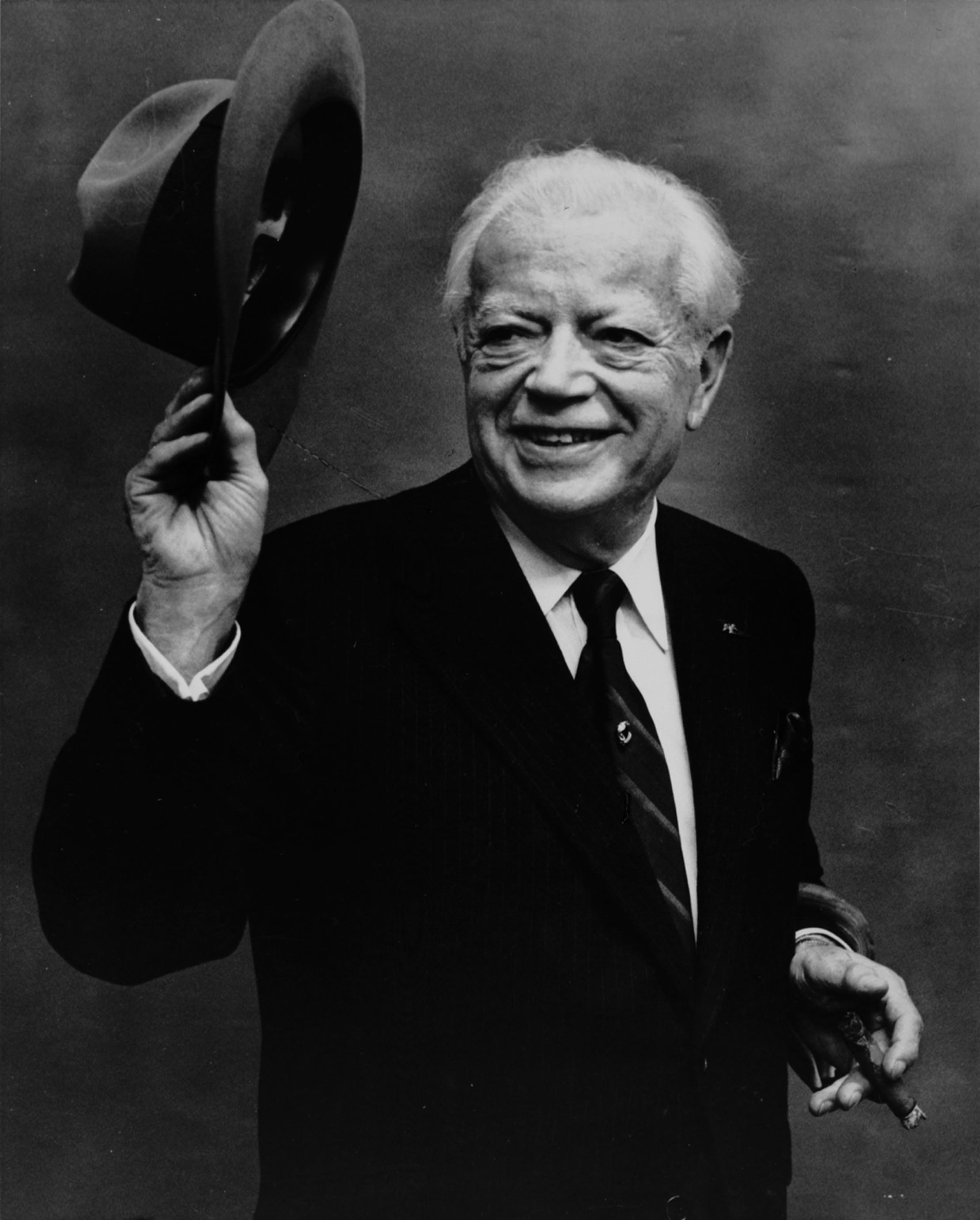
Dubinsky in retirement, 1972

On March 17, 1966, Dubinsky resigned as leader of the ILGWU at the age of 74. At the time of his retirement, he had led the ILGWU for 34 years. Nearly three years after his retirement, he received the Presidential Medal of Freedom on January 20, 1969, from President Richard Nixon. He died September 17, 1982, in New York City.

Dubinsky had a profound impact on the development of workers' rights, both in the garments industry and in general: among his achievements were the first garment industry pact for a 35-hour week, the first employer-contributed fund for worker vacations, affordable housing for workers, and initiatives in workers' health and training.

== Gallery ==
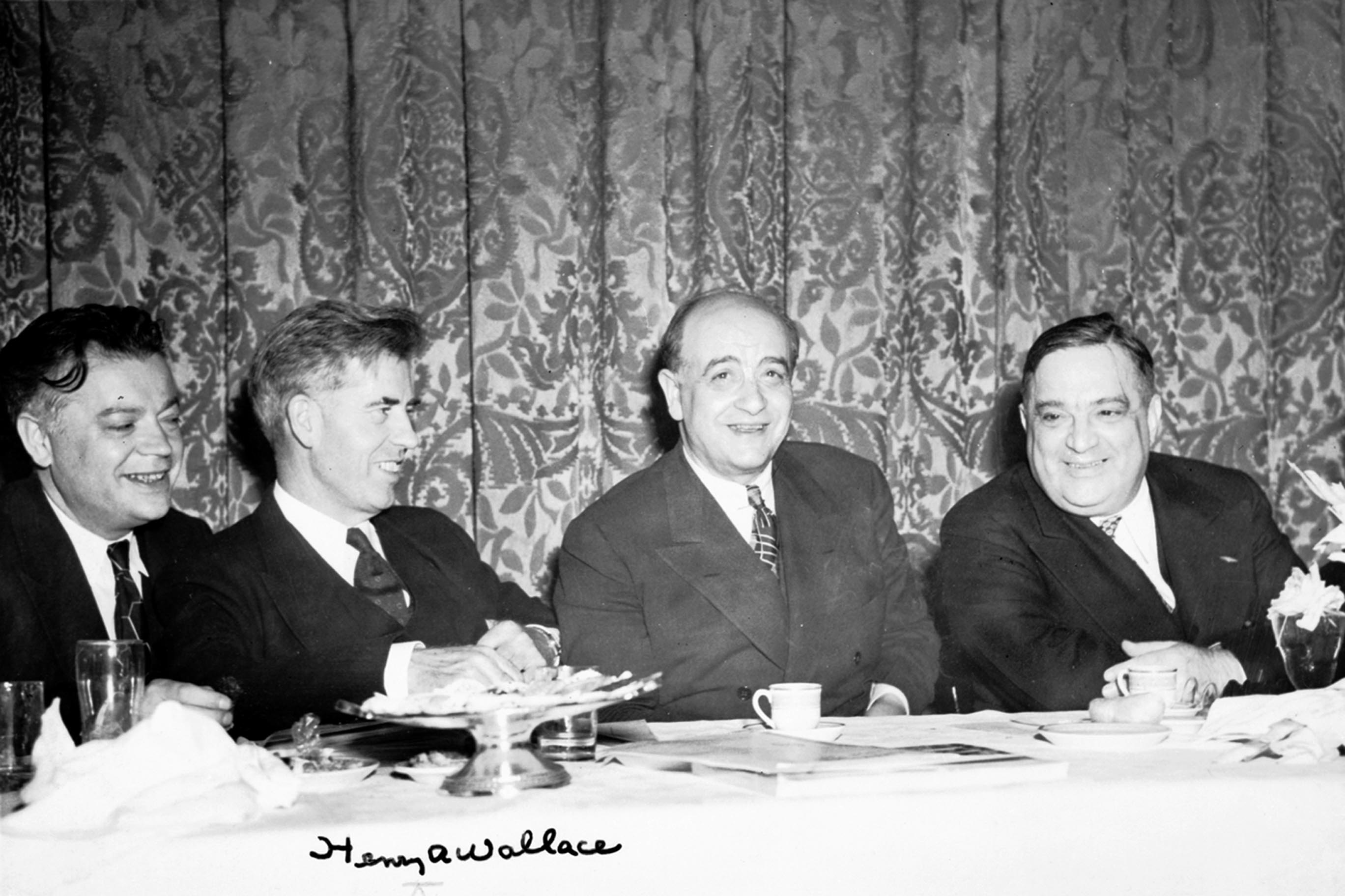
Dubinsky with Henry A. Wallace and Fiorello LaGuardia

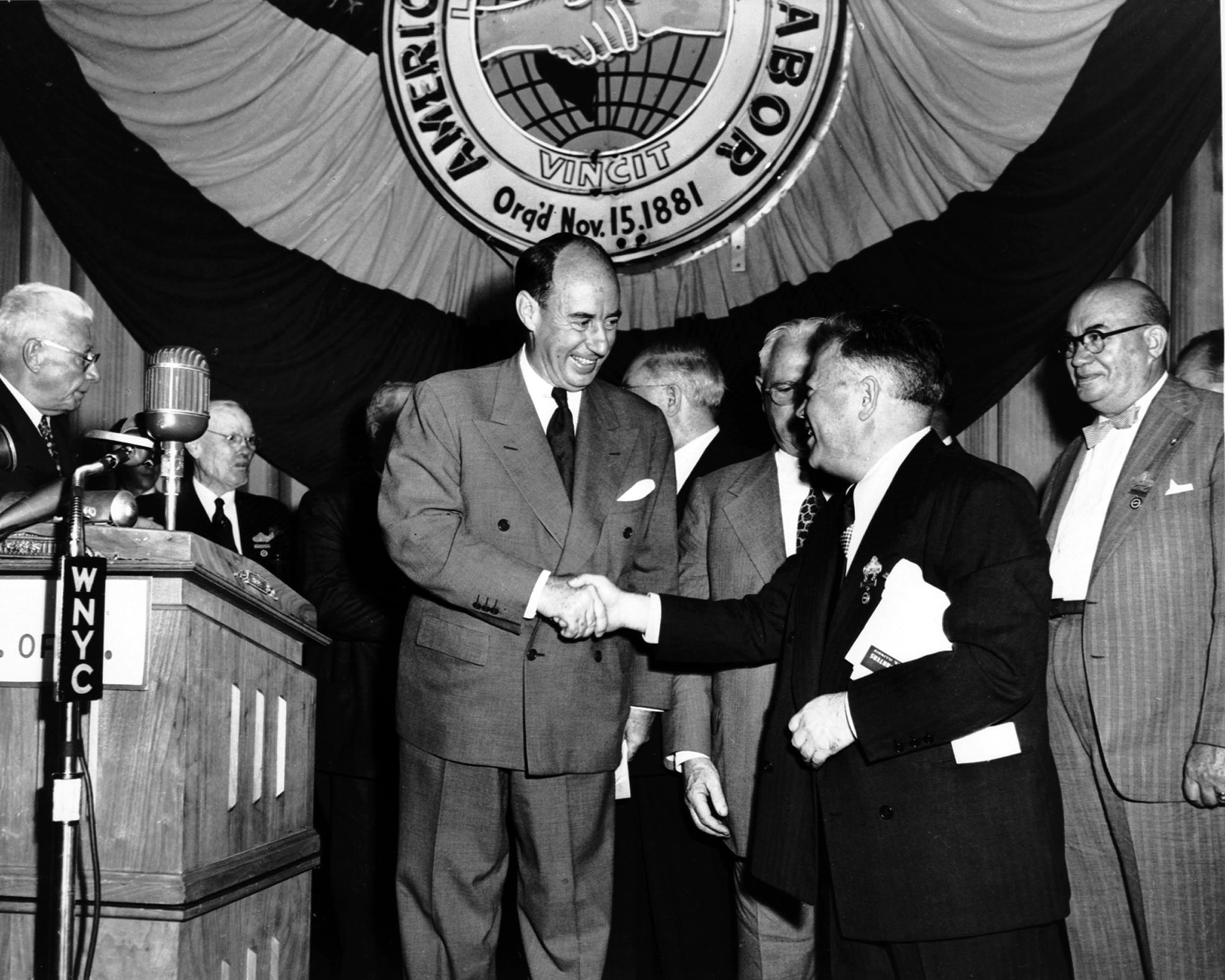
Dubinsky shaking hands with Adlai Stevenson II

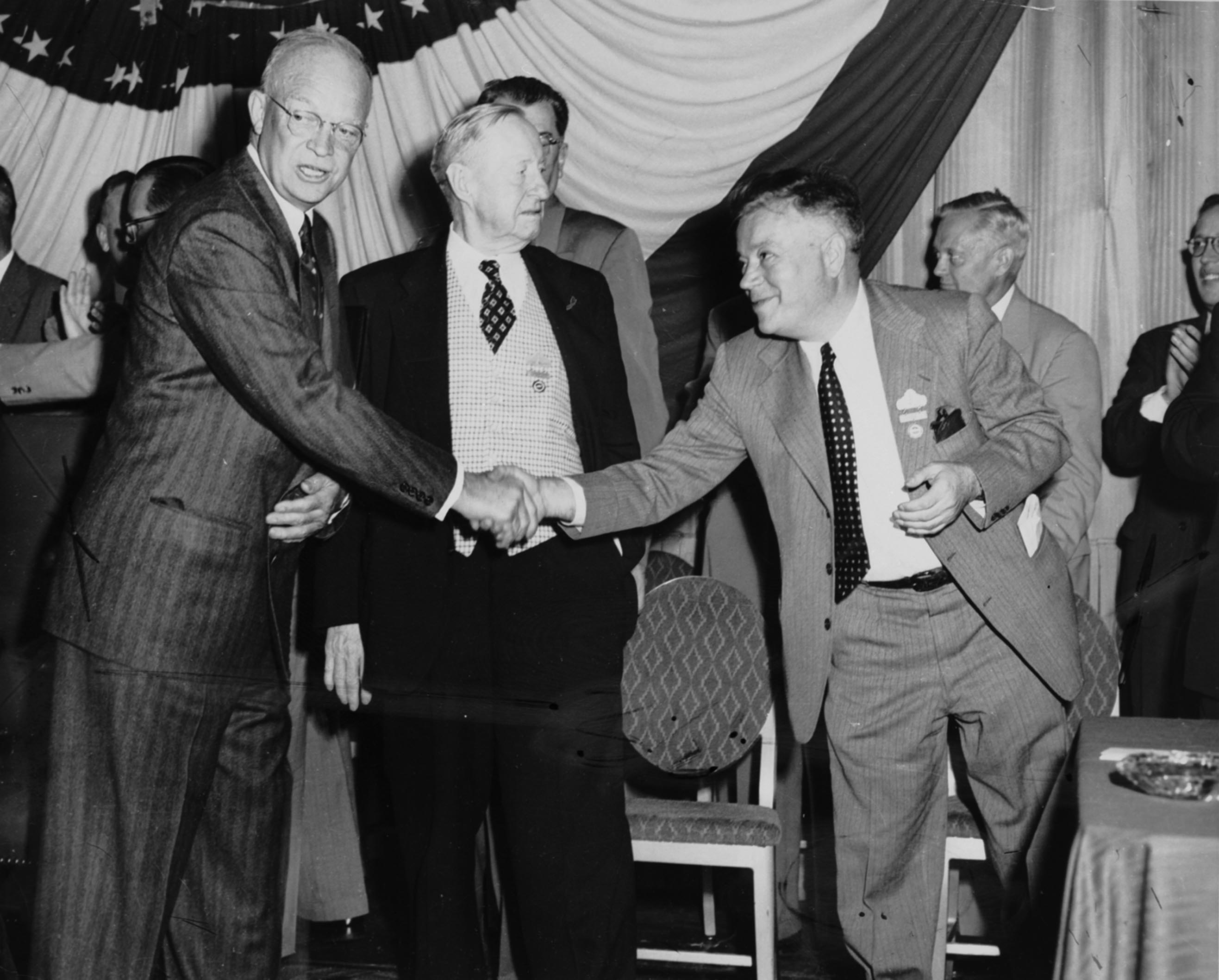
Dubinsky shaking hands with Dwight D. Eisenhower

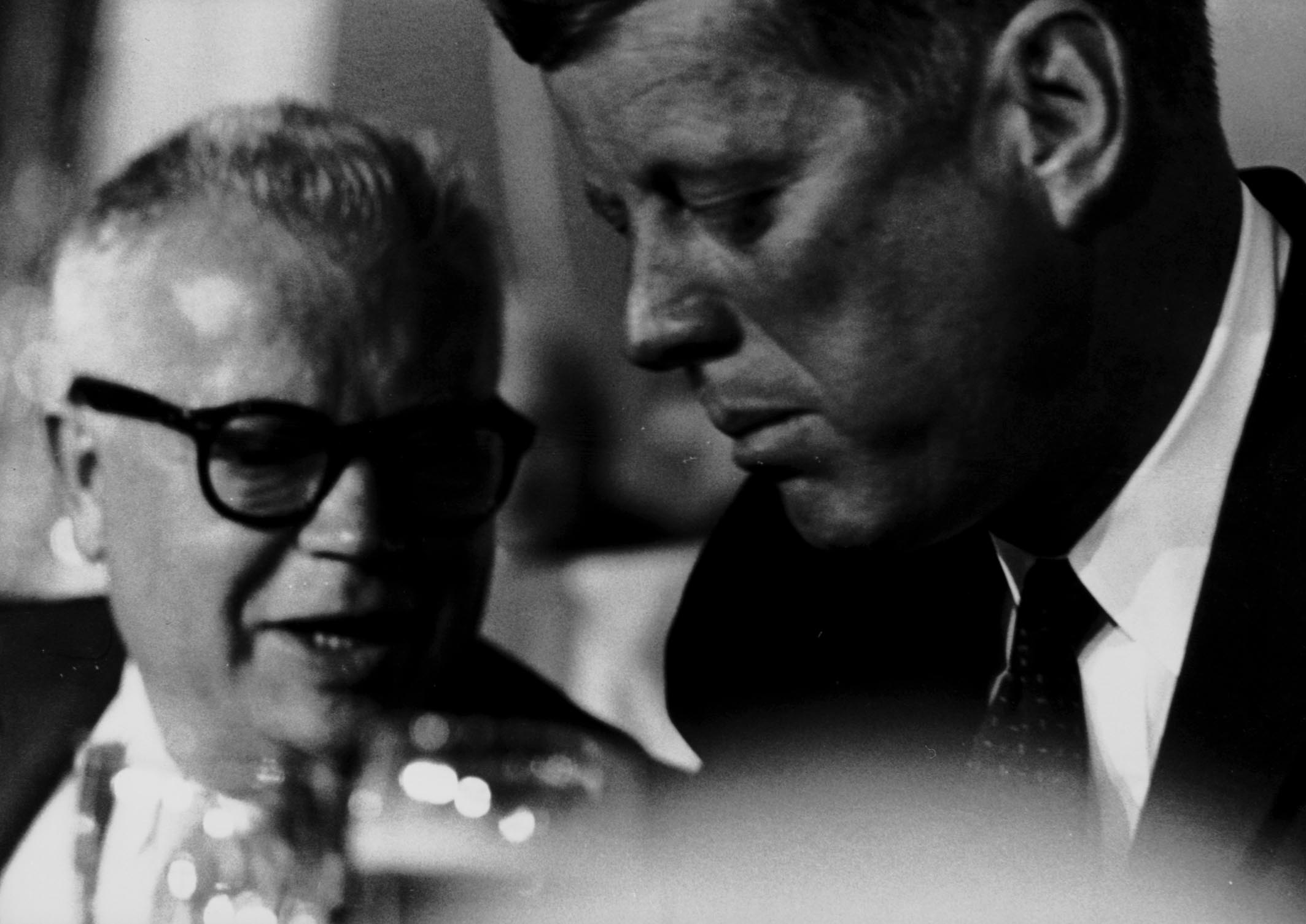
Dubinsky and John F. Kennedy

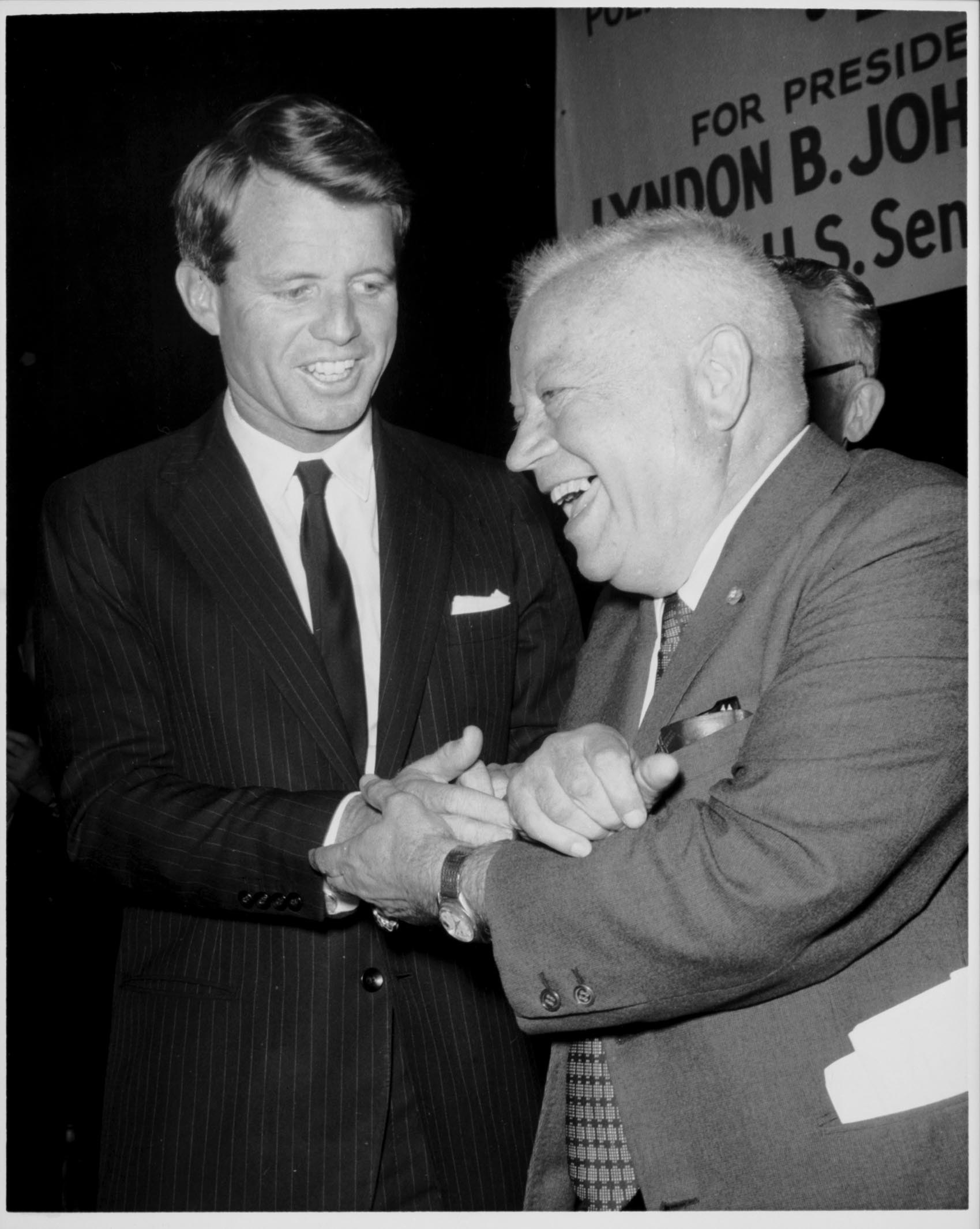
Dubinsky shaking hands with Robert F. Kennedy

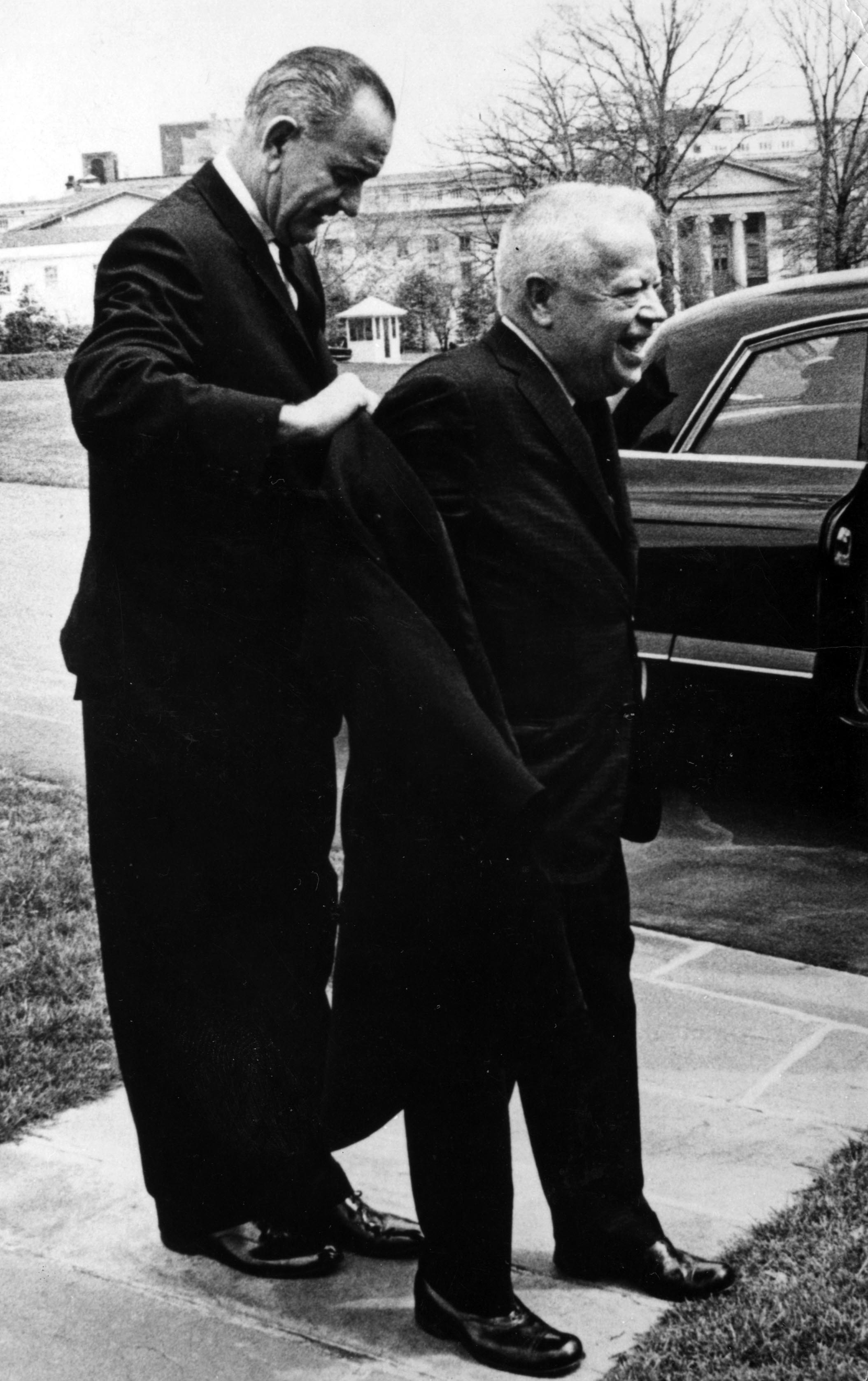
Lyndon Johnson helps Dubinsky with his coat

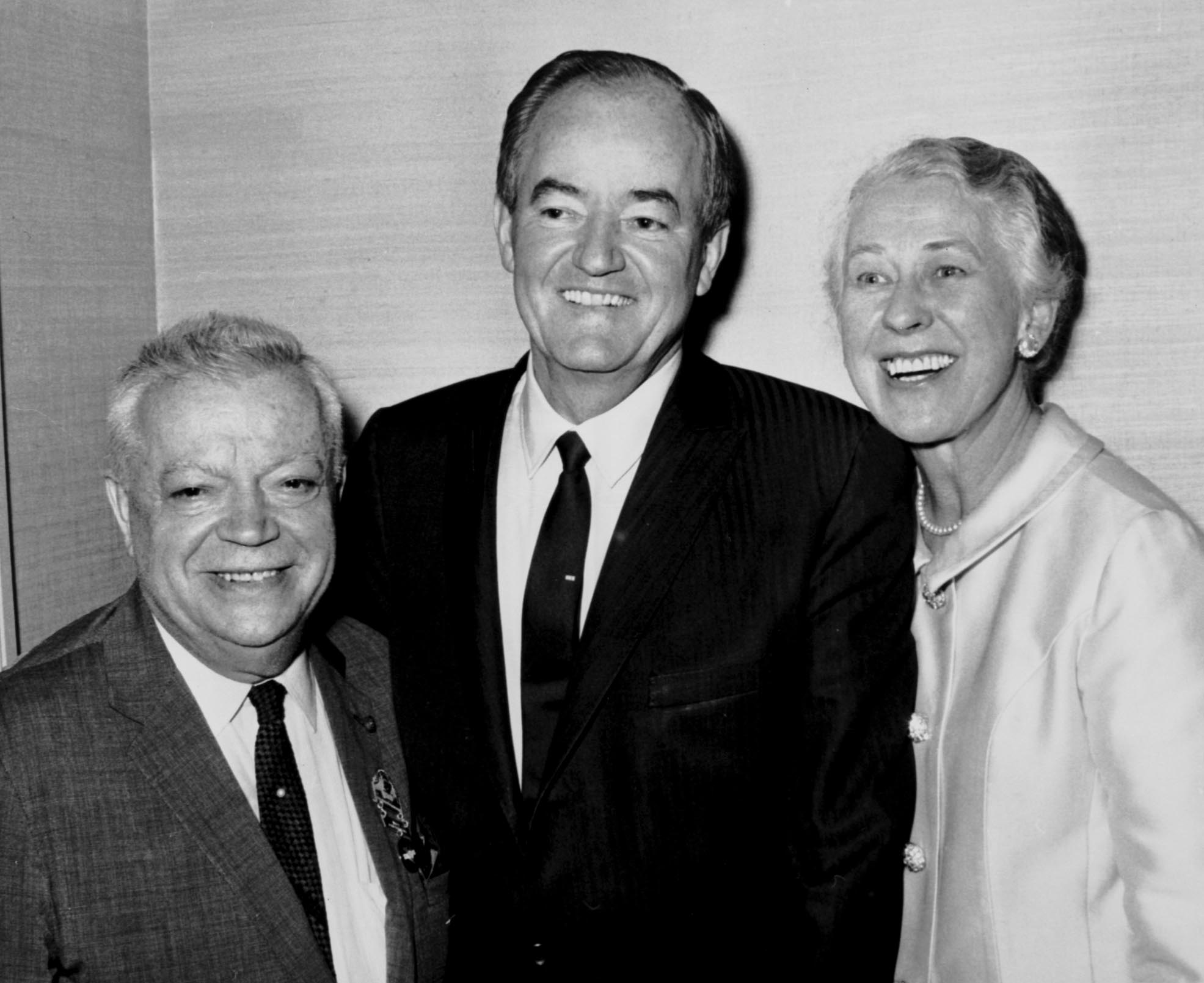
Dubinsky with Hubert Humphrey and Muriel Buck Humphrey

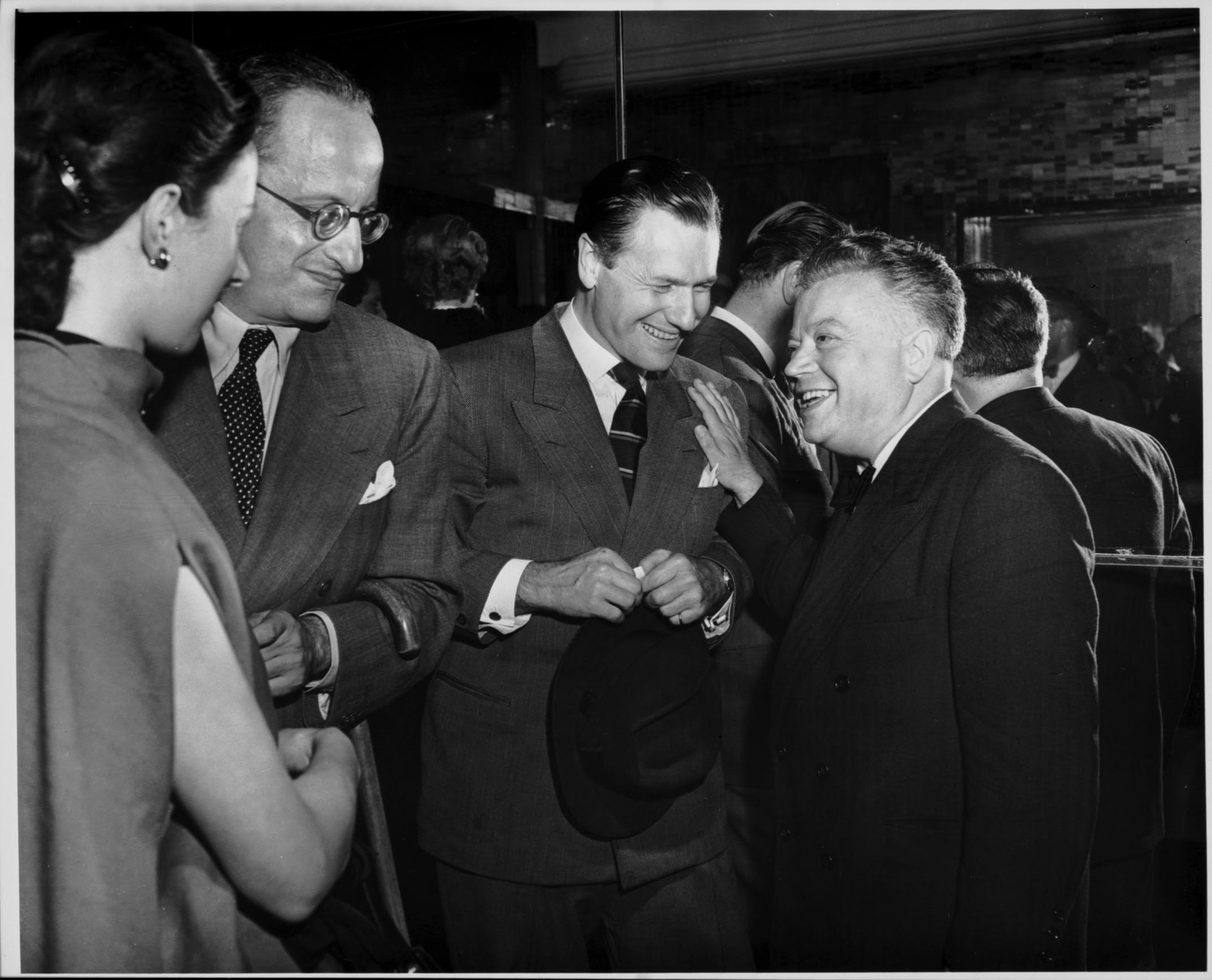
Dubinsky with Nelson Rockefeller

Trade union offices
Preceded by Abraham Baroff	Secretary-Treasurer of the International Ladies' Garment Workers' Union; 1929–1959	Succeeded by Louis Stulberg
Preceded by Benjamin Schlesinger	President of the International Ladies' Garment Workers' Union; 1932–1966	Succeeded by Louis Stulberg
