= Terence M. O'Sullivan =

American activist (born 1955)

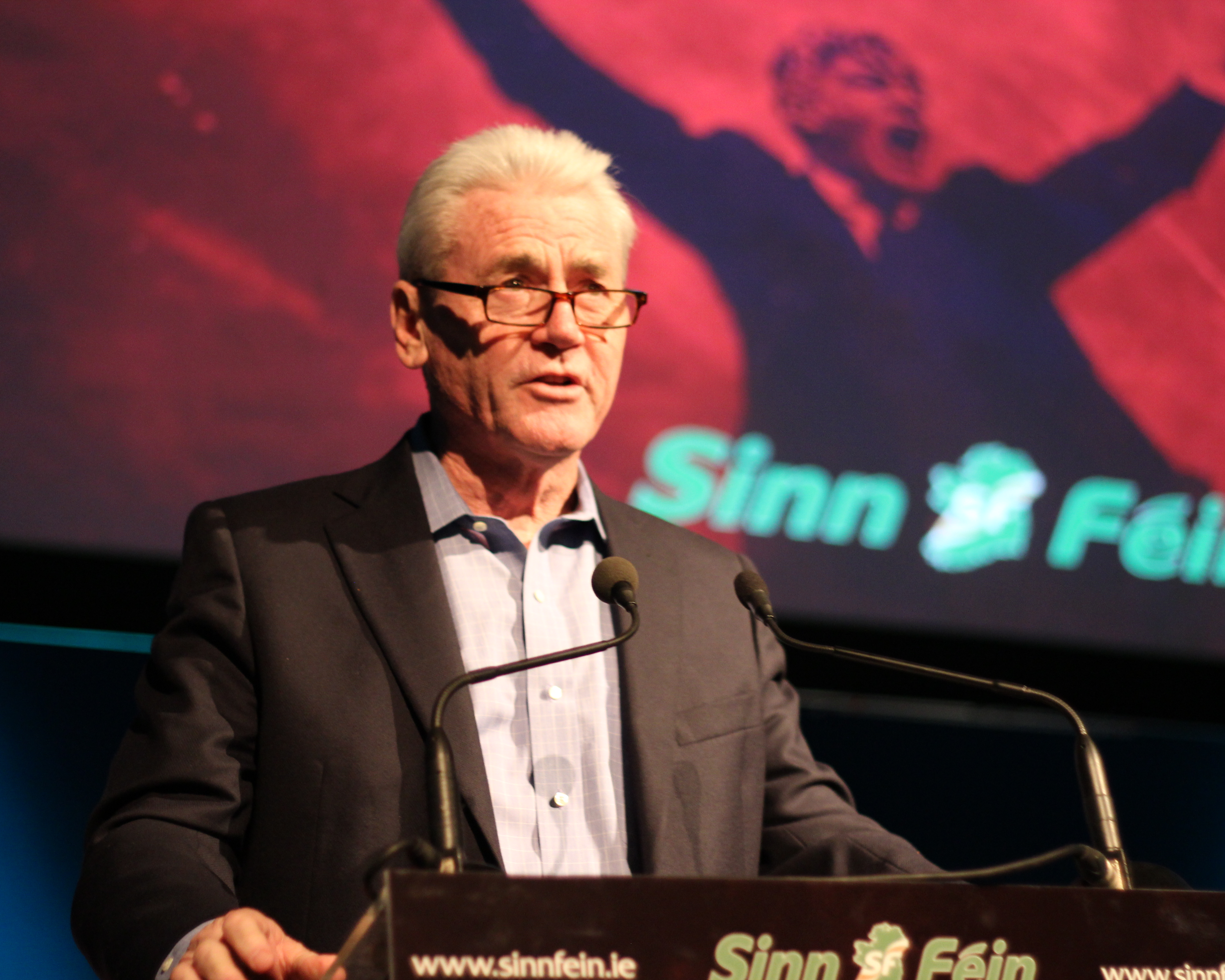
- O'Sullivan speaking in October 2013
- Born: June 29, 1955 (age 71); San Francisco, California, U.S.
- Education: American University
- Occupation: Activist

Terence M. O'Sullivan (born June 29, 1955) is a labor union activist who was president of the Laborers' International Union of North America (LIUNA) from 2000 until 2023.

== Early life and career ==
O'Sullivan was born on June 29, 1955, in San Francisco, California. His father, Terence J. O'Sullivan was an official in the Laborers' Union, and the family moved to Virginia in 1968 after his father was elected the international union's secretary-treasurer. In 1981, his father was indicted in a kickback scheme, but was acquitted.

O'Sullivan attended American University in Washington, D.C. He majored in business administration, and graduated with a bachelor's degree in 1974. While still in college, he earned money working as a laborer for a company building the city's subway system, Metro. It was during this time that he first joined the Laborers' Union (Local 456).

After matriculating, O'Sullivan was a high school teacher and baseball coach in Northern Virginia for three years. In 1978, O'Sullivan started a computer services company. He married and then later separated from his wife, and has a son, Brendan, and a daughter, Caitlin.

== Career ==
In 1987, O'Sullivan's teaching and computer interests converged when he was appointed an instructor at the West Virginia Laborers' Training Fund. In that position, he taught training seminars and helped blue-collar laborers learn how to program and operate new, computerized heavy machinery. As head of the training fund, O'Sullivan joined LIUNA Local 1353 in Charleston, West Virginia. In 1989, he became the fund's administrator.

In 1993, LIUNA president Arthur Coia appointed O'Sullivan assistant director of the international union's construction, maintenance and service trades department. O'Sullivan moved his family to Clifton, Virginia. During his tenure as assistant director of the department, O'Sullivan convinced the union to build a number of new training centers on the country.

In February 1999, O'Sullivan was elected an international vice president. O'Sullivan was appointed mid-Atlantic regional manager of the union and assistant to the president, and the union's chief of staff shortly thereafter.

=== LIUNA president ===
On December 6, 1999, LIUNA president Arthur Coia announced he would be retiring at the end of the year.

The United States Department of Labor (DOL) and United States Department of Justice (DOJ) had prosecuted the Laborers' Union in 1995 for racketeering, corruption and ties to organized crime. A consent decree permitted Coia (elected in 1992) to remain president so long as he made significant progress toward internal reforms. DOJ retained the authority to take over the union (appointing its own officers, setting its own budget, and making its own reforms) if Coia did not make what DOJ considered to be adequate progress toward reform. The agreement was modified and extended for one year in January 1998, and again in January 1999. By 1999, 226 individuals were expelled from the union, and 40 trusteeships of local unions established. A major reform was the first secret-ballot election for president and secretary-treasurer at the union's 1996 convention, which was also the first contested election for a LIUNA presidency.

Coia, had been cleared by federal and union officials of a number of serious crimes and violation of union rules in 1998, but new evidence pointed to more fraud. According to the government, Coia obtained three Ferraris from a luxury car dealer at a cost far below fair-market value. In return, he used his influence to steer union business to the dealer. Coia later pleaded guilty to federal tax evasion and fraud. He avoided a jail term, and was permitted to retire while still receiving a portion of his salary.

After being vetted by federal officials, the union's executive council elected O'Sullivan president to replace Coia.

On January 20, 2000, just weeks after his election, O'Sullivan, DOJ and DOL agreed to extend the government's oversight of the union another six years, until January 2006.

In 2001, O'Sullivan broke with the AFL-CIO and supported the drilling for oil in Arctic National Wildlife Refuge. He even co-authored an op-ed piece with United States Secretary of the Interior Gale Norton advocating increased oil production.

==== ULLICO scandal ====
In 2002, while O'Sullivan was a member of the board of directors of the Union Labor Life Insurance Company (ULLICO), the company was caught up in a share repurchase scandal. In 1999, ULLICO chairman, president and chief executive officer Robert Georgine proposed a stock trading scheme: ULLICO directors could sell falling shares of stock and buy ULLICO shares at a low price. Because ULLICO is a privately held company, the board of directors re-sets the stock price once a year. The directors could re-establish the stock price at a higher level, then vote to have the company repurchase their shares. They could then set the share price at its lower level, and net millions of dollars in profits. Although present at the November 2000 board meeting at which the repurchase plan was approved, O'Sullivan did not vote in favor of the plan and did not participate in the stock-trading scheme.

The scandal was reported by the press in March 2002. AFL-CIO president John Sweeney pushed the board to appoint an internal investigator. When the investigator's report was complete in November 2002, Sweeney pushed the board to make the report public. A majority of the board voted to keep the report secret. Sweeney resigned from the board, then threatened to bring the matter up before a public meeting of the executive council of the AFL-CIO. The board established an eight-member special advisory committee, headed by O'Sullivan, to decide whether to release the report. The committee unanimously agreed to release the report, but O'Sullivan was out-voted 6 to 2 to accept the report's recommendation that directors return their profits to ULLICO.

In a hastily organized board meeting late on April 23, 2003, Sweeney, O'Sullivan and Edwin D. Hill (president of the International Brotherhood of Electrical Workers) nominated a reform slate of 13 new board members. Georgine withdrew his name as a candidate for the board. O'Sullivan was only one of two incumbents to return to the board. O'Sullivan was elected ULLICO's new chairman, replacing Georgine.

O'Sullivan then led an investigation which revealed even more corruption and greater profits from the stock trading scheme then previously revealed. O'Sullivan demanded the return of these additional profits, and slowly brought ULLICO back to financial health. He remains the company's chairman and CEO as of January 2007.

=== AFL-CIO disaffiliation and reaffiliation ===
O'Sullivan broke with Sweeney over the need for and nature of reform of the AFL-CIO. Although not initially part of the coalition led by Andy Stern, president of SEIU, O'Sullivan eventually became part of the New Unity Partnership (which transformed into the Change to Win Federation). O'Sullivan was particular vocal in demanding that the AFL-CIO rebate up to 50 percent of all dues to international unions for use in new member organizing.

O'Sullivan threatened to disaffiliate from the AFL-CIO at its quadrennial convention in late July 2005, but did not do so. Nevertheless, he said his union would leave the federation in time.

In February 2006, O'Sullivan took the first step toward disaffiliation by withdrawing his union from the Building and Construction Trades Department (BCTD) of the AFL-CIO. The Laborers and the International Union of Operating Engineers (an AFL-CIO affiliate) quit the BCTD and formed a rival group, the National Construction Alliance. Joining the Alliance were the United Brotherhood of Carpenters and Joiners of America (not an AFL-CIO affiliate), the Teamsters (not an AFL-CIO affiliate), the Iron Workers (an AFL-CIO affiliate which remained part of BCTD) and the Bricklayers (an AFL-CIO affiliate which remained part of BCTD). O'Sullivan said BCTD had been ineffective in organizing new members and stopping the proliferation of nonunion contractors. O'Sullivan made four demands on BCTD: Its leaders must resign and new elections must be held; its budget must be trimmed to permit more money to be spent on organizing; it must alter its proportional representation rules, which give more delegates to smaller unions; and it must revise its rules for determining which unions have jurisdiction over various kinds of work. AFL-CIO officials say they agreed to all of O'Sullivan's demands except for the first, arguing that the constitutionally scheduled BCTD elections should occur on schedule.

Finally, on June 1, 2006, the Laborers' Union disaffiliated from the AFL-CIO and joined the Change to Win Federation.

The union announced that it would leave Change to Win on August 13, 2010, and the AFL-CIO said that the reaffiliation would be formalized in October 2010.

=== 2006 Convention ===
In September 2006, elected delegates to the union's 23rd General Convention passed several resolutions. One resolution focused on organizing and growth and mandated increased contributions to regional organizing funds. Based on a contribution formula of 25 cents per hour for every hour members work, the union will raise more than $100 million a year in new organizing resources. In addition, delegates elected O'Sullivan to his second full term as General President.

== Notes ==
Trade union offices
| Preceded by Arthur Coia | President of the Laborers' International Union of North America; 2000 - 2023 | Succeeded by Brent Booker |
Business positions
| Preceded by Robert Georgine | Chairman of the Board of Ullico; 2003–2006 | Succeeded by Joseph J. Hunt |
