= Moss Landing Power Plant =

Natural gas-fired power station in Moss Landing, California

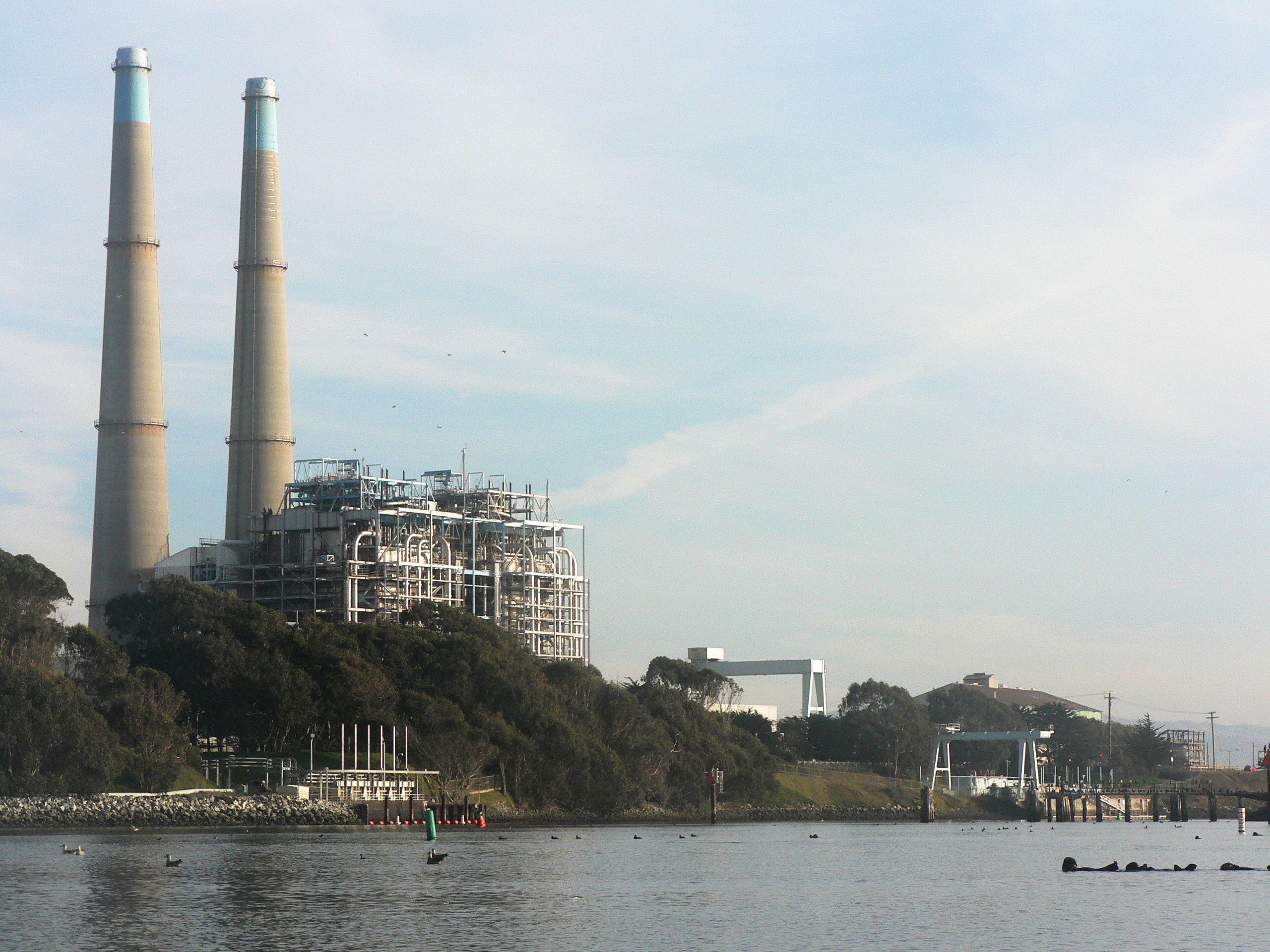
- Moss Landing Power Plant, with its highly visible stacks
- Country: United States
- Location: Moss Landing, California
- Coordinates: 36°48′17.54″N 121°46′55.19″W
- Status: Operational
- Commission date: 1950
- Owner: Vistra Corp

Thermal power station
- Primary fuel: Natural gas
- Combined cycle?: Yes

Power generation
- Units operational: 2 × 530 MW
- Units decommissioned: 7
- Nameplate capacity: 1,060 MW
- Capacity factor: 46% (2024)
- Annual net output: 4,026 GWh (2024)

External links
- Commons: Related media on Commons

Vistra Moss battery
- Country: United States
- Coordinates: 36°48′09″N 121°46′25″W
- Status: Mothballed
- Owner: Vistra Corp

Power generation
- Nameplate capacity: 450 MW (was 750)
- Storage capacity: 1800 MWh (was 3000)

External links
- Commons: Related media on Commons

PG&E Elkhorn battery
- Country: United States
- Coordinates: 36°48′28″N 121°46′56″W
- Status: Mothballed
- Owners: PG&E

Power generation
- Nameplate capacity: 182.5 MW
- Storage capacity: 730 MWh

External links
- Commons: Related media on Commons

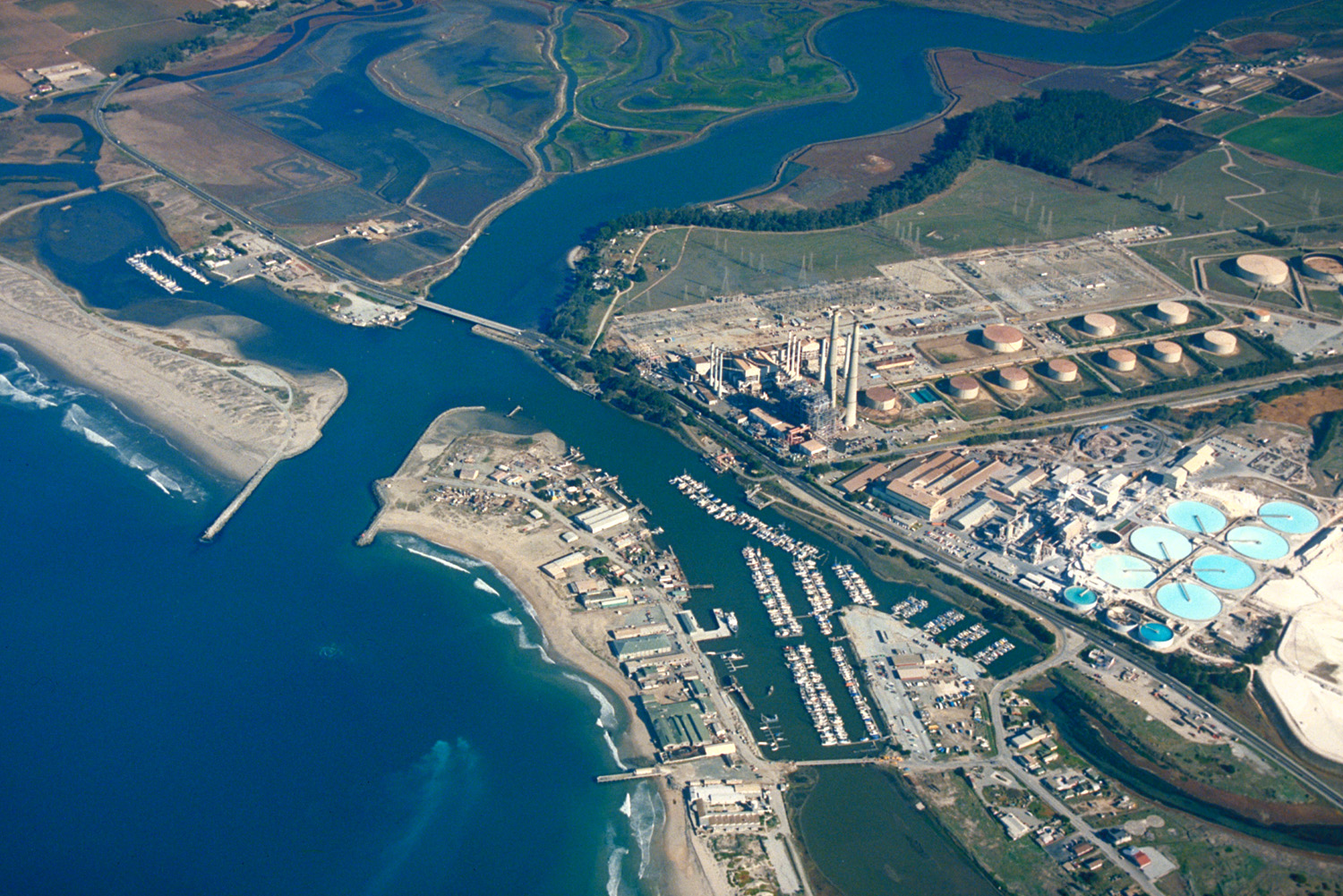
Aerial view of Moss Landing Power Plant, 2007

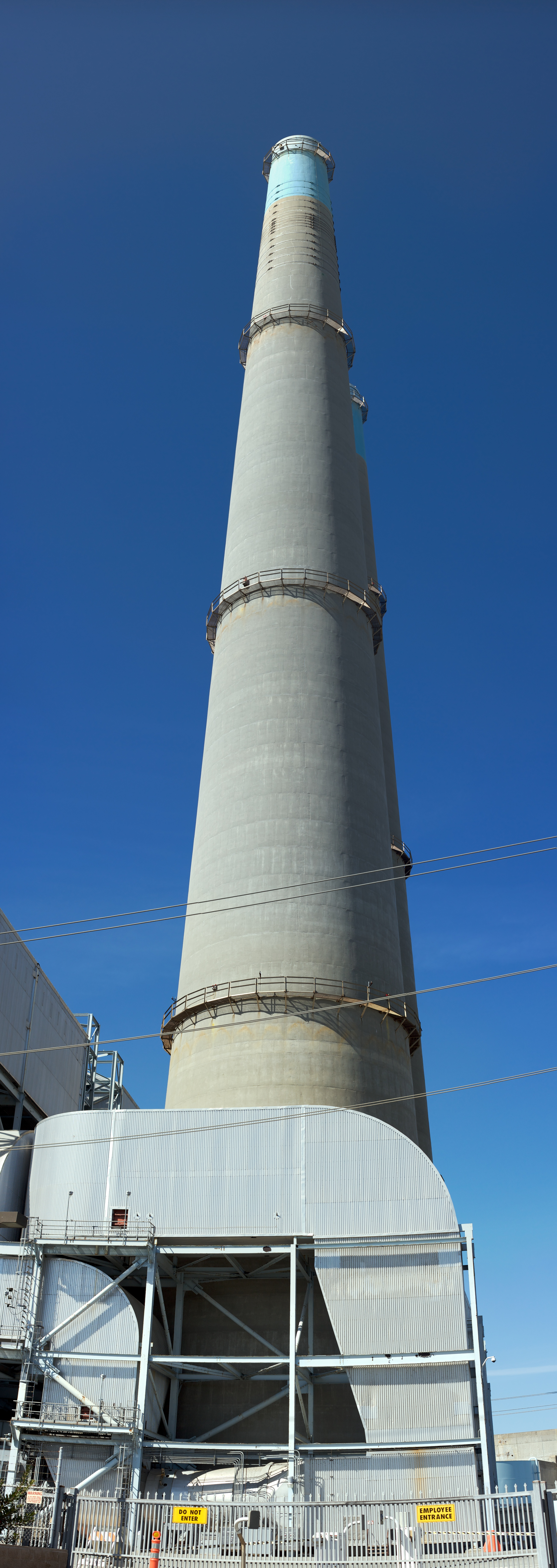
One of the stacks for units 6 and 7

The Moss Landing Power Plant is a natural gas powered electricity generation plant as well as a battery energy storage facility, located in Moss Landing, California, United States, at the midpoint of Monterey Bay. As of 2025, the site's battery storage facility is one of the largest in the world, at 630 MW (power) and 2,500 MWh (energy). The energy storage facility stores excess electricity (usually lower-price solar electricity during the daytime) for later use during periods of higher electricity demand (usually evening hours).

The battery energy storage facility at Moss Landing consists of two separate energy storage facilities. The first battery storage facility, known as the Vistra Energy Storage Facility is owned and operated by the Vistra Corp, and the second, known as the Elkhorn Battery Facility is owned and operated by California's PG&E utility company. The Elkhorn Battery Facility utilizes Tesla batteries to meet its energy storage needs.

The plant's two large 500′ tall stacks are local landmarks, visible throughout the Monterey Bay Area. Both the power generating plant and one of the battery storage facilities are owned and operated by the Irving, Texas based Vistra Corp. PG&E owns the second battery energy storage facility. The power generation plant currently has a capacity of 1020 MW (net) from its two combined cycle units. It was once the largest power plant in the state of California, with a generation capacity of 2560 MW, before its two large supercritical steam units were retired in 2016.

== History ==
In 1949, Pacific Gas & Electric (PG&E) began construction on the Moss Landing Power Plant. Five natural gas and oil powered steam units were built during the 1950s. Commercial generation started in 1950 with a capacity of 613 MW.

In 1964, the construction of two additional units began (6 and 7), with two new 500-foot (150 m) stacks. These two units had a capacity of 750 MW each for a total of 1500 MW, with 180 feet (55 m) tall boilers. They employed a newer technology using supercritical steam at 3,600 psi (25 MPa).

In 1995, the original five units were retired, and in 1997 PG&E let the permits lapse for these units.

As part of the Deregulation of Utilities in California, PG&E sold the plant to Duke Energy (DENA) in 1998. To comply with more restrictive pollution regulations, units 6 and 7 were upgraded in 1998 with a selective catalytic reduction unit and digital control systems.

Starting in 2000, the eight 225-foot (69 m) stacks and 19 fuel oil storage tanks were removed, and two new units were built on the former site. The new units 1 and 2 were brought online in 2002. They are combined cycle units, 50% more efficient than the other units, because they use two turbines: first, a pair of 170 MW gas turbines, then a 190 MW steam turbine, for a total of 530 MW each. When completed in 2002, the plant was the largest power plant in California by capacity, at 2560 MW.

In 2006, having invested over half a billion dollars in upgraded capacity, efficiency and emission control, Duke Energy sold the plant to LS Power Equity Partners. Dynegy purchased the plant in April 2007 along with other assets of LS partners.

In 2015, a transmission tower collapsed at the power plant, causing a major Monterey County area power outage.

On December 31, 2016, Dynegy retired supercritical steam units 6 and 7 as they were no longer economically competitive. Dynegy continued to maintain the permit on these units. The facility was being dismantled in 2023.

In February 2017 Dynegy announced that it may close Moss Landing, due to market conditions resulting from a glut of wholesale electricity capacity in California making it difficult to operate profitably. By 2018, California had 7,000 MW of surplus generating capacity, but a similar amount (mostly ocean cooled) would be retired by 2021. The glut in electricity capacity is partially a result of policies which guarantee utilities like PG&E (a regulated monopoly) a return on investment for building new power plants, even when they are not needed. Independent power producers like Dynegy, on the other hand, did not have a guaranteed return on their investment. Power production had dropped considerably, reducing taxes paid to Monterey County.

On April 9, 2018 Vistra Corp merged with Dynegy Inc, and thus also acquired the Moss Landing Power Plant. Vistra opted not to close the Moss Landing plant, but instead to expand it. In 2021 Vistra began to refer to its Moss Landing power plant facility as the "Vistra Moss Landing Energy Storage Facility".

== Connections to the California power grid ==
The plant has power lines that connect it to Path 15, and interconnections like Path 26 and Path 66 that allow power to flow to far-away regions. The plant is also connected to local loads and the San Jose region by transmission lines.

== Natural Gas power generation ==
Both the supercritical units and the combined cycle units use once-through cooling. The supercritical units have a cooling requirement of 600,000 US gallons (2,300 m^{3}) per minute, and the combined cycle units a requirement of 250,000 US gallons (950 m^{3}).

=== Supercritical Steam Units 6 and 7 ===
Units 6 and 7 used supercritical steam. These units were retired at the end of 2016. At the end of their life, units 6 and 7 were typically operated as peaking units when demand for electricity was highest. In 2016, the last year of operation, they only operated approximately 3% of the time.

The generation process for units 6 and 7 starts with natural gas injected at one end of the boiler to be burned. Primary water is injected at the other end of the boiler to receive the heat produced. The gas simply comes from a natural gas pipeline, and combustion products go up the stack and into the atmosphere. Water has a much more complicated path, and consists of two distinct systems: coolant water and primary (steam-generating) water. Cooling water is pumped out of the Monterey Bay or the nearby Elkhorn Slough. Then it is purified, used to cool down the water coming from the turbines, and discharged into the ocean. Steam for the turbines is created from the primary water flow, which is preheated before entering the boiler. From the boiler, the superheated steam is directed into a first turbine working at high pressure, then into a low pressure turbine. The turbines drive the generators.

=== Combined Cycle Units 1 and 2 ===
Combustion products drive the gas turbines directly. First, air is drawn from the air intake to the compressor (driven by the turbine axle), then it is burned with natural gas in the combustion chamber. The hot combustion gasses then go through the actual turbine (driving the axle). From a thermodynamic standpoint, this is the standard Brayton cycle.

At the output of the gas turbines, some of the remaining energy (heat) in the exhaust gas is recovered through a heat exchanger and transferred to water that feeds a steam turbine, similar to units 6 and 7.

On a smaller scale than the supercritical units, units 1 and 2 are also more flexible, with a start-up time of only an hour, against 24 hours for units 6 and 7.

== Battery energy storage facilities ==
Utilities in California are required by a 2013 law to provide significant battery storage by 2024. The Moss Landing Power Plant site has since been chosen as California's primary location to provide battery based energy storage in order to better utilize renewable energy sources such as solar and wind on a grid-wide commercial scale. On June 29, 2018 Vistra Corp announced that it planned on building at the Moss Landing Power Station site, what became the world's largest commercial electric battery energy storage site. The batteries use around 100 GWh/year as energy lost during the round-trip.

=== Planning and construction ===
==== Vistra Corp development ====
On June 29, 2018, Vistra Energy announced that it will develop a 300 MW / 1,200 MWh energy storage system to be located at Moss Landing, using the existing turbine building and existing interconnection from units 6 and 7, connecting to the 500 kV grid. Vistra Energy expected the energy storage system to begin commercial operation by the end of 2020, pending receipt of approval from California Public Utilities Commission (CPUC). This would be the largest lithium-ion battery energy storage system in the world. The project began construction in December 2019, and Phase 1 began operating at the end of 2020. It was made of LG JH4 cells in TR1300 racks in two storeys in the old turbine hall.

Phase 2 adding a further 100 MW / 400 MWh was completed in August 2021, bringing total capacity to 400 MW / 1,600 MWh.

In 2023, construction of Phase 3 (113,000 modules in 122 special containers in open air) with another 350 MW / 1,400 MWh was underway to bring total capacity to 750 MW / 3,000 MWh, and commissioned in August 2023.

An expansion to 1,500 MW / 6,000 MWh (also connecting to the 500 kV grid) was approved in August 2020, but the company stated it would only implement the expansion if market conditions were advantageous.

==== Elkhorn development ====
Utilities in California are required by a 2013 law to provide significant battery storage by 2024. Pacific Gas & Electric (PG&E) asked the CPUC to approve four energy storage projects located adjacent to the Moss Landing plant, including another large lithium-ion battery storage system of 182.5 MW / 730 MWh ("Elkhorn", located between the old turbine hall and Elkhorn Slough) to be provided by Tesla and owned and operated by PG&E, connecting to the regional 115 kV grid.

The Elkhorn Battery Facility was designed to improve energy reliability and to allow for more renewable energy sources to be used at the Moss Landing site by increasing electricity storage available in California. The project aimed to save costs by reducing PG&E's reliance on gas peaker power plants that come online during periods of increased demand. The facility was to deploy 256 Tesla Mega packs to meet its energy storage needs.

On July 3, 2019, in accordance with the California Environmental Quality Act, the County of Monterey Resource Management Agency published a Mitigated Negative Declaration, detailing actions that must be taken to mitigate potential environmental impacts of the project. The report concluded that the project would have a "Less than Significant Impact" on the environment, assuming the correct mitigating actions were taken. Specifically, it was found that mitigating actions were required to minimize the environmental impact of the project on "biological resources" such as wildlife habitat, and on "cultural resources", especially culturally-significant archaeological sites at the proposed location of the Megapack deployment.

The project was subsequently opened to public submissions on its environmental impact. California Unions for Reliable Energy argued that the County of Monterey failed to meet the standards of the California Environmental Quality Act when performing its environmental assessment. This same union group, with the same legal representation, used similar arguments against the California Flats solar project in order for organized labor to get concessions from the developer.

In February 2020, the Monterey County Planning Commission unanimously approved the project, which was initially scheduled to start construction in late March and be complete by 2021. The COVID-19 pandemic in California and subsequent stay-at-home order delayed the project. Construction with the Tesla Megapacks began in July 2020.

The PG&E Elkhorn Battery Facility was commissioned and went online on June 7, 2022.

=== Fires and high temperature safety incidents ===
==== Vistra Corp's high temperature safety incidents ====
In September 2021 Phase 1 was shut down after a high temperature safety incident (no fire) caused by a leak in a liquid cooling hose, while Phase 2 kept operating.

In February 2022 another high temperature safety incident (no fire) occurred at the Vistra site. During this event Phases 1 and 2 went offline. By July, 2022 most of the facility was back in operation.

==== 2022 Elkhorn Battery Facility fire ====
On September 20, 2022, a fire occurred at the Elkhorn Battery Facility (owned and operated by PG&E) when a single Tesla Megapack caught fire. Safety controls immediately disconnected the facility from the California power grid. PG&E customers were ultimately not affected by the shut-down and no injuries were reported from the mishap. Approximately three months later, on December 30, 2022, the Elkhorn Battery Facility was placed back online. After the Vistra fire in January 2025, the Elkhorn Battery was also taken offline. They attempted to restart the Elkhorn Battery on June 1, 2025 but aborted the restart due to a leak in the cooling system.

==== January 2025 fire ====
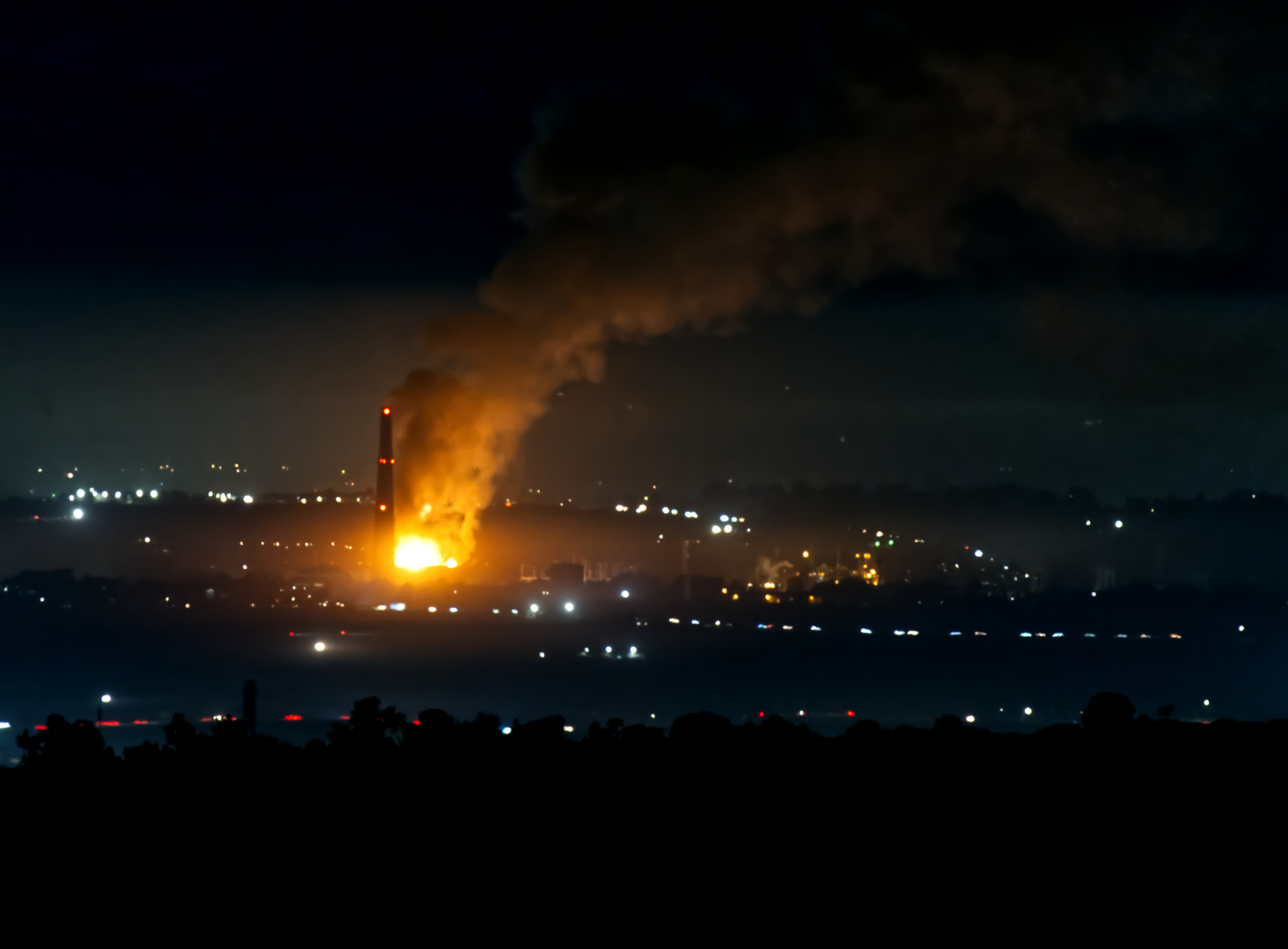
Moss Landing Battery Fire, 16 January 2025

At 3 pm on Thursday, January 16, 2025, a fire broke out in the Phase 1 building (300 MW / 1,200 MWh), the portion of the site managed by Vistra Corp. Battery systems (made of lithium nickel manganese cobalt oxides, an older technology not used in most newer stationary battery storage systems) ignited in the concrete hall, releasing large flames, reaching the fire's first peak between 8 and 10 pm. The building's fire suppression system failed to quench the fire, but the fire was contained within the area of the concrete building. The enclosed facility was inside the building, a condition that may have contributed to spread of the fire, as opposed to the majority of batteries which are located outside in separate modules, where fire spread is more difficult and easier to mitigate. Local authorities initiated the evacuation of 1,200 residents, who returned the next day.

As per lithium battery fire protocols, firefighters did not try to extinguish the blaze, but let it burn. These fires usually release toxic gasses and burn very hot. Local authorities expressed concerns regarding the release of hydrogen fluoride and other hazardous materials, however none were found. During the two days of the fire wind velocities were low, allowing the smoke plume to rise high into the atmosphere before much dispersion had occurred. By Friday morning the fire appeared to have largely gone out, however by early Friday afternoon the fires had increased in intensity once again. Later in the day the flames subsided. Air samples taken at ground level measured no hydrogen fluoride pollution. Around 80% of this battery section had burned. Near the end of January, San Jose State University's Moss Landing Marine Laboratories reported a dramatic increase in levels of nickel, magnesium, and cobalt heavy metals compared to baseline statistics.

On the evening of January 17, 2025, the fire diminished to a point where Monterey County officials allowed evacuated individuals to return to their homes. On January 22, Monterey County opened the last road in the vicinity. Some local authorities restricted battery projects due to the incident.

In February, the fire reignited, but within 24 hours was declared under control by the local fire chief.

As of March 2025, most of the damaged batteries have been disconnected, and cleanup may take more than a year. A cleanup plan was approved in July 2025, and American Battery Technology Company began the process in late 2025. The value of recycled materials could be $30 million. Vistra wrote off $400 million on the damage. The cause of the fire remains undetermined, but California has already adopted changes to its fire safety law and standards for battery energy storage facilities.

==== September 2026 fire ====
On September 18, 2026, a fire broke out in a structure that was previously damaged in the January 2025 fire.

== See also ==
- Energy in California
- List of power stations in California
- List of energy storage projects
