= California Assembly Bill 130 (2025) =

Modification to California Environmental Quality Act

California State Legislature
- Full name: An act to amend Sections 714.3, 5850, and 5855 of, and to add Section 2924.13 to, the Civil Code, to amend Sections 12531, 54221, 65400, 65584.01, 65584.04, 65589.5, 65905.5, 65913.10, 65913.16, 65928, 65941.1, 65952, 65953, 65956, 66323, and 66499.41 of, to amend and repeal Sections 65940, 65943, and 65950 of, to add Section 8590.15.5 to, and to repeal Section 66301 of, the Government Code, to amend Sections 17958, 17958.5, 17958.7, 17973, 17974.1, 17974.3, 17974.5, 18916, 18929.1, 18930, 18938.5, 18941.5, 18942, 37001, 50222, 50223, 50253, 50515.10, 50560, 50561, 50562, 53560, and 53562 of, and to add Sections 17974.1.5, 50058.8, 50406.4, 50410, and 53568 to, the Health and Safety Code, to amend Sections 21180, 21183, and 30603 of, and to add Sections 21080.43, 21080.44, 21080.66, 30114.5, and 30405 to, the Public Resources Code, to amend Section 17053.5 of the Revenue and Taxation Code, and to amend Section 5849.2 of the Welfare and Institutions Code, relating to housing, and making an appropriation therefor, to take effect immediately, bill related to the budget.
- Introduced: January 8, 2025
- Assembly voted: January 30, 2025 (62–3–15)
- Senate voted: June 30, 2025 (28–5–7)
- Signed into law: June 30, 2025
- Sponsor: Assem. Wicks
- Governor: Gavin Newsom
- Bill: AB 130
- Website: Bill Information

Status: Current legislation

California Assembly Bill 130 (AB 130) is a 2025 law which exempts most infill housing development from review under the California Environmental Quality Act (CEQA). The bill incorporated text from AB 609, drafted by Assemblymember Buffy Wicks, while the bill itself was a budget trailer bill intended to be mandatory in order for the state budget to take effect. The bill was signed into law by Governor Gavin Newsom on June 30, 2025.

The bill was signed by Newsom alongside California Senate Bill 131 (SB 131), another budget trailer law which incorporated text from SB 607 as drafted by Senator Scott Wiener. SB 131 exempts certain other projects from CEQA review, including advanced manufacturing in industrial districts, high-speed rail, and wildfire mitigation.

Both bills were pushed by Newsom, who required that both bills be incorporated into the state budget as a condition for his approval of the budget.

== Reception ==
The bills' passage was well received by supporters of the YIMBY movement, while environmental groups worried about potential environmental and health consequences from the bills' carve-outs of CEQA.

Earlier language in both bills instituted lower prevailing wages for construction on housing projects than is standard in non-housing construction projects, which drew the opposition of trade unions, including the North America's Building Trades Unions president Sean McGarvey and AFL-CIO president Liz Shuler, while gaining the support of the NorCal Carpenters Union. The language was removed on July 25, and opposing unions subsequently withdrew their opposition to the bills.
