= Mark Ayers =

American labor union leader (1949–2012)

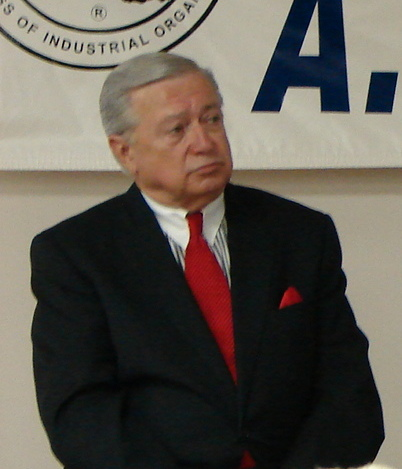
Mark Ayers at an AFL-CIO veterans' event in 2008.

Mark H. Ayers (January 22, 1949 – April 8, 2012) was an American labor leader who was president of the AFL-CIO Building and Construction Trades Department from 2007 until his death in 2012. He was described as "the second most powerful man in the labor movement" in this period.

== Biography ==
Mark Ayers was born in Canton, Illinois, in 1949. His father was a coal miner.

Ayers served as a U.S. Navy aviator for four years, including in the Vietnam War.

Having settled in Peoria, Illinois, in 1973 he started his career an apprentice with the International Brotherhood of Electrical Workers Local 34, working his way up to become business manager of the local.

In 1998, he married Deborah Lynn Selburg. That year, he moved to Washington, D.C., to become the director of the IBEW's Construction and Maintenance Department. He was elected president of the AFL-CIO Building and Construction Trades Department, one of the most powerful positions in the American labor movement, in 2007.

Ayers died on April 8, 2012. Shortly after his death, he was inducted into the U.S. Department of Labor's Labor Hall of Honor. A street in Peoria was named in his honor in 2015.

Trade union offices
Preceded by Ed Sullivan	President of the Building and Construction Trades Department; 2007–2012	Succeeded by Sean McGarvey
Business positions
Preceded by Ed Sullivan	Secretary-Treasurer of Ullico; 2007–2012	Succeeded by Sean McGarvey
