= Ed Sullivan (unionist) =

American labor union leader

14th President of the Building and Construction Trades Department
- In office 2000–2007
- Preceded by: Robert Georgine
- Succeeded by: Mark Ayers

13th President of the International Union of Elevator Constructors
- In office 1998–2000
- Preceded by: John N. Russell
- Succeeded by: Dana Brigham

Edward C. Sullivan is a former American labor union leader, who served as the 14th President of the Building and Construction Trade Department and the 13th President of the International Union of Elevator Constructors.

== Early career ==
Born in Boston, Sullivan became an assistant elevator mechanic in 1964, and joined the International Union of Elevator Constructors. In 1981, he was elected as business manager of his union local, campaigning on democratic reforms. By 1996, he was appointed as assistant to the union's president, and then in 1998 he won election as president of the union.

== Career ==
In 2000, Sullivan was elected president of the Building and Construction Trades Department, AFL-CIO. In the post, he created the Helmets to Hardhats to encourage military veterans to work in the industry, and he formed the Construction Users Roundtable to work with employers. On election, he faced opposition from some affiliates, which culminated in the resignation of the International Brotherhood of Teamsters and United Brotherhood of Carpenters and Joiners of America. However, he won over the remaining affiliates and solidified his position.

Sullivan was also elected as a vice-president of the AFL-CIO. From 2003, he served as secretary-treasurer of Ullico. He also chaired the boards of directors of the National Coordinating Committee for Multi-employer Plans and the Center to Protect Workers' Rights. He retired from all his posts in 2007, but accepted a general board seat on Ullico.

== Personal life ==
In 1997, Sullivan received the Gompers-Murray-Meany Award, the top award of the Massachusetts AFL-CIO.

Trade union offices
Preceded by John N. Russell	President of the International Union of Elevator Constructors; 1998–2000	Succeeded by Dana Brigham
Preceded by Robert Georgine	President of the Building and Construction Trades Department; 2000–2007	Succeeded by Mark Ayers
Business positions
Preceded by Bill Casstevens	Secretary-Treasurer of Ullico; 2003–2007	Succeeded by Mark Ayers
