= Peter Fosco =

Peter Fosco (May 13, 1892 – October 26, 1975) was a Polish-born American labor union leader.

Born in Poland, at the time governed by Russia, to Italian parents, Fosco emigrated to the United States in 1913 and settled in Chicago. There, he worked as a laborer, and joined the Laborers' International Union of North America (LIUNA). He was elected as financial secretary of his local union in 1916, and then as president in 1920. That year, he unsuccessfully put himself forward as a Republican Party candidate for Congress. In 1936, he was appointed as manager of the union's Chicago region. From 1938 to 1946, he additionally served on the Cook County Board of Commissioners, representing the Democratic Party.

Fosco was elected as international secretary-treasurer of the LIUNA in 1950, and then as the union's president in 1968. As leader of the union, he negotiated a merger with the National Association of Post Office and Postal Transportation Service Mail Handlers, Watchmen and Messengers, and worked to increase the union's organizational, training and educational capacity. From 1969, he also served as a vice-president of the AFL-CIO, and as first vice-president of the federation's Building and Construction Trades Department. In 1972, he was awarded a plaque by Richard Nixon at a Columbus Day dinner, with Nixon citing Fosco's support of the prosecution of the Vietnam War. The Fosco Park community center was also named for him.

Fosco died in 1975, while still in office. He was succeeded as president of LIUNA by his son, Angelo Fosco.

Trade union offices
Preceded by Achilles Persion	Secretary-Treasurer of the Laborers' International Union of North America; 1950–1968	Succeeded by Terence J. O'Sullivan
Preceded by Joseph V. Moreschi	President of the Laborers' International Union of North America; 1968–1975	Succeeded by Angelo Fosco
