= Thomas E. Burke =

Irish-born American labor union leader

Thomas E. Burke (1864 – October 23, 1941) was an Irish-born American labor union leader.

Born in Ireland, Burke emigrated to the United States after completing his primary schooling. Settling in Chicago, he attended the Illinois College of Law, then in 1882, was apprenticed as a plumber. As a journeyman, he worked internationally. He first joined a plumbers' union in 1886, and then in 1889 was a founding member of the United Association union.

In 1896, Burke was elected as president of his union local in Chicago. He began working full-time for the union in 1902, as a general organizer. The union's leadership was thrown out in 1906, but Burke was a supporter of new president John R. Alpine and remained in post. In 1909, he was elected as secretary-treasurer of the union, also becoming editor of its journal, the Plumbers', Gas and Steam Fitters' Journal.

Burke remained in post until his death, in 1941.

Trade union offices
Preceded by John Love	Secretary-Treasurer of the United Association; 1909–1941	Succeeded by Martin Patrick Durkin
Preceded by Joseph A. Franklin; E. E. Milliman	American Federation of Labor delegate to the Trades Union Congress; 1934; With: Christian Madsen	Succeeded by Michael J. Colleran; Edward Flore
