= Brotherhood of Maintenance of Way Employes =

Trade union

Brotherhood of Maintenance of Way Employes Division
- Brotherhood of Maintenance of Way Employes Division
- Founded: July 1887
- Location: United States
- Members: 36,025 (2014)
- Affiliations: International Brotherhood of Teamsters
- Website: www.bmwe.org

The Brotherhood of Maintenance of Way Employes (BMWE; later the Brotherhood of Maintenance of Way Employes Division of the International Brotherhood of Teamsters, BMWED) is a national union representing the workers who build and maintain the tracks, bridges, buildings and other structures on the railroads of the United States.

== History ==

In July 1887, American labor leader John T Wilson at age 26 founded the organization at Demopolis, Alabama. He was also the Grand Lodge President of the organization for 19 years before dying after being shot in the head by his brother-in-law, Frank J. Engleman.

Wilson met with other section foreman to discuss mutual problems of low wages, the hazards of their work, and the insecurity of their families. They decided to form, the Order of Railroad Trackmen to assist fellow railroad workers in times of sickness and financial trouble. Once an international union with over 350,000 members in the United States and Canada, automation, the rise of the trucking and airline industries, coupled with railroad mergers have depleted the ranks of the BMWED to under 40,000 members.

In 2004 the BMWE merged with the International Brotherhood of Teamsters and consolidated its strength with that of the 1.4-million-member Teamsters Union. They are in the Teamster Rail Conference along with the Brotherhood of Locomotive Engineers and Trainmen.

In April 2024, the BMWE announced its support to fire Norfolk Southern Railway CEO Alan Shaw, who was targeted for removal in an investor-led effort to replace the company's management and several of its directors. CNBC called the union's support of the plan "a significant endorsement in an industry unusually dependent on union support."

Organized labor is divided on the plan to get rid of Alan Shaw, with BMWE and BLET Teamsters voicing their opposition to Shaw, while AFL-CIO came out in support of Shaw.

== Leadership ==
Tony Cardwell was elected as President of the BMWED in June 2022, also elected was Staci Moody-Gilbert the first woman Vice President and Reese Saulter the first African American Vice President.

== Organization ==
=== Grand Lodge President ===
1887: John T Wilson
1908: A. B. Lowe
1914: T. H. Gerrey
1914: A. E. Barker
1920: E. F. Grable
1922: Fred Fljozdal
1940: E. E. Milliman
1947: T. C. Carroll
1958: Harold C. Crotty
1978: Ole M. Berge
1986: Geoffrey Zeh
1990: Mac A. Fleming
2004: Freddie Simpson
2022: Tony Cardwell
