= International Union of Pavers, Rammermen, Flag Layers, Bridge and Stone Curb Setters and Sheet Asphalt Pavers =

The International Union of Pavers, Rammermen, Flag Layers, Bridge and Stone Curb Setters and Sheet Asphalt Pavers was a labor union representing workers involved in roadway construction in the United States and Canada.

The union was chartered on August 28, 1905, as the International Union of Pavers and Rammermen, and was chartered by the American Federation of Labor. By 1925, it had about 2,000 members. It underwent numerous name changes. From about 1914, its official name was the International Union of Pavers, Rammermen, Asphalt Workers, Mastic Asphalt Workers, Asphalt Block, Brick, Iron Slag and Wood Block Pavers, Flaggers, Bridge and Stone Curb Setters. In 1931, it adopted its final, somewhat shorter, name. On February 9, 1937, it merged into the International Hod Carriers', Building and Common Laborers' Union of America.

== Presidents ==
T. M. Doherty
1926: Joseph Dillon
Michael Carrozzo
