= Joseph P. Ryan =

American labor union leader (1884–1963)

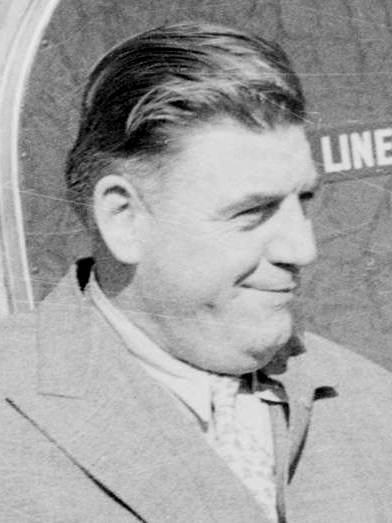
Ryan in 1934

Joseph Patrick Ryan (May 11, 1884 – June 26, 1963) was an American labor union leader.

Born in Babylon, New York, Ryan worked various jobs from the age of 12 and became in 1912 a longshoreman on the New York docks. He immediately joined the International Longshoremen's Association (ILA) and in 1913 became financial secretary of his local union.

In 1916, Ryan began working full-time for the union, and two years later, he was elected as president of the ILA's Atlantic Coast District. He was also elected as a vice-president of the international union, becoming first vice president in 1921. In 1927, he was elected as president of the union. Under his leadership, he came into conflict with union members on the West Coast, who split away to form the International Longshoremen's and Warehousemen's Union. He strongly opposed industrial unionism and communism. After World War II, he imposed a ban on ILA members handling cargo from the Eastern Bloc.

From 1928 to 1938, Ryan was the president of the Central Labor Council of Greater New York and Vicinity. He was appointed to lead an American Federation of Labor investigation into corruption in the International Seamen's Union, which indirectly led to that union's replacement by the Seafarers' International Union of North America.

In 1938, Ryan was elected as president for life of the ILA. However, the union was increasingly seen as corrupt, and was expelled from the AFL. In 1953, he stood down as its leader, and faced charges ranging from misappropriating union funds to evading income tax. In 1955, he was convicted of violating the Taft-Hartley Act by accepting money from a company that employed longshoremen, but that was overturned on appeal. By then, he was in poor health, but he maintained until his death that the ILA was entirely free of corruption.

Trade union offices
Preceded by Anthony Chlopek	President of the International Longshoremen's Association; 1927–1953	Succeeded by William Bradley
Preceded by John J. Manning; Thomas E. Maloy	American Federation of Labor delegate to the Trades Union Congress; 1931; With: Joseph V. Moreschi	Succeeded by Joseph A. Franklin; E. E. Milliman
Preceded by New department	President of the Maritime Trades Department; 1952–1955	Succeeded by Harry Lundeberg
