= International Union of Elevator Constructors =

North American trade union

- Abbreviation: IUEC
- Formation: July 18, 1901
- Type: Trade union
- Headquarters: Columbia, Maryland, US
- Locations: Canada; United States
- Members: 28,620 (2018)
- President: Frank J. Christensen
- Affiliations: AFL–CIO (North America's Building Trades Unions); Building and Wood Workers' International
- Website: iuec.org
- Formerly called: National Union of Elevator Constructors

The International Union of Elevator Constructors (IUEC) is a trade union in the United States and Canada that represents members who construct, modernize, repair, and service elevators, escalators, moving walkways, and other conveyances. The IUEC claims a membership of over 25,000.

The IUEC is a bargaining unit for its members who in turn pay quarterly dues to compensate for the representation. There are various locals throughout the United States and Canada made up of members from the same geographic areas. In conjunction with union employers, the union administers the National Elevator Industry Health Benefit Plans to offer pension benefits and healthcare.

Data indicates that elevator-related work is the highest paid trade in the United States, with a median wage $51.24 per hour in 2025.

== History ==
In 1932, the union threatened a strike, which prompted the Elevator Manufacturers Association to raise wages.

In 1972, the union was involved in a major elevator strike.

Historically, the union has excluded black members. In 1963, the head of the New York local of the union said it had "maybe three" black members and argued that this was because black people were "afraid of heights." In 1974, the union entered into an agreement with the Labor Department where it pledged to make a "good faith effort" to hire more minority workers.

In 1977, 1,500 union members went on strike against the Westinghouse Elevator Company.

In the early 2000s, Local 1 of the union, which represented 2,900 members, was subject to a federal labor racketeering investigation, leading to the indictment of several union leaders.

In 2005, the union was embroiled in a labor dispute with New York's elevator companies over wage increases and over proposals by the companies to streamline elevator construction guidelines. The union also sought to prevent companies from using what it said was unskilled people to make elevator repairs.

The union has lobbied for New York state legislation to require all elevator repairmen to be licensed.

== Presidents ==
1904: Frank Feeney
1905: William Havenstrite
1906: P. E. Cryder (acting)
1907: Joseph Murphy
1916: Frank Feeney
1938: John C. MacDonald
1955: Edward A. Smith
1959: Thomas Allen
1962: John Proctor
1966: R. Wayne Williams
1976: Everett A. Treadway
1991: John N. Russell
1998: Ed Sullivan
2000: Dana Brigham
2012: Frank J. Christensen

== See also ==
- Montanile v. Board of Trustees of Nat. Elevator Industry Health Benefit Plan
