= Robert Georgine =

Robert Anthony Georgine (July 18, 1932 – March 29, 2011) was an American labor union activist and leader, who served for a number of years as president, chairman and chief executive officer of the Union Labor Life Insurance Company.

== Early life and career ==
Robert Anthony Georgine was born in Chicago, Illinois on July 18, 1932 to Silvio and Rose (Hogue) Georgine. He married the former Mary Greener, and they had four children.

With only had a high school diploma and some college education (he never graduated), Georgine became a woodworker operating lathes and other wood working machinery. He joined the International Union of Wood, Wire and Metal Lathers (now part of the United Brotherhood of Carpenters and Joiners of America). He became his local union's business manager in 1962 and an international union representative in 1964.

Georgine's ascent in the union hierarchy was meteoric. After becoming a staff representative, he was appointed an assistant to the president of the Wood, Wire and Metal Lathers in 1965.

Georgine was elected president of the Wood, Wire and Metal Lathers in 1970. He served only one year: In 1971, he resigned union office after being elected secretary-treasurer of the Building and Construction Trades Department (BCTD) of the AFL-CIO In 1974, Georgine was elected president of the Department. In 1985 he was elected to the AFL-CIO Executive Council.

Georgine proved a highly effective and very popular BCTD president. In 1985, the AFL-CIO broke tradition by electing Georgine to the AFL-CIO executive council. He became the first constitutional department head to serve on the council.

Georgine was named chairman, president and chief executive officer of the Union Labor Life Insurance Company (ULLICO) in 1990.

In the latter years of his tenure as BCTD president, Georgine was confronted with a number of problems. In 1995, he was challenged for the presidency of BCTD by A. L. "Mike" Monroe, president of the International Union of Painters and Allied Trades. Sigurd Lucassen, president of the United Brotherhood of Carpenters and Joiners of America and the largest BCTD affiliate, opposed Georgine's re-election even though Georgine's running mate was Carpenters' first vice president Paschal McGuinness. Monroe, Lucassen and others argued that Georgine had failed to maintain the effectiveness of local BCTD councils, refused to fund organizing programs and allowed jurisdictional disputes to get out of hand. They also claimed that Georgine's role as chief executive officer of ULLICO left him little time to devote to BCTD business. In a close election, however, Georgine won. McGuiness resigned less than a year later, after being investigated by federal authorities for corruption.

In 1996, federal authorities questioned whether Georgine interfered in a union election. The United States Department of Labor (DOL) filed suit to overturn the October 1995 presidential election in the International Union of Bricklayers and Allied Craftworkers. A portion of the DOL lawsuit alleged that Georgine used BCTD funds and his position as president to support the re-election of the incumbent president (a Georgine supporter). Georgine was cleared, but the investigation put a cloud over his final term in office at BCTD.

Robert Georgine retired as BCTD president on April 15, 2000.

== Retirement from ULLICO ==
Although Georgine remained as president, chairman and CEO at ULLICO, he became caught up in a scandal with forced him to retire on May 8, 2003. He proposed a stock purchase deal to ULLICO's board of directors in which they would be able to buy ULLICO stock at a low price, then re-establish the stock price at a higher level. ULLICO would then repurchase their shares at that higher level, allowing them to reap millions in profits. After a lengthy scandal, Georgine was forced off the board and removed as CEO of ULLICO.

Robert Georgine settled with ULLICO in 2005, repaying millions to the company. He died from complications of a stroke on March 29, 2011, at the age of 78.

== Notes ==
Trade union offices
Preceded by Frank Bonadio	Secretary-Treasurer of the Building and Construction Trades Department; 1971–1974	Succeeded by Joseph F. Maloney
Preceded by Frank Bonadio	President of the Building and Construction Trades Department; 1974–2000	Succeeded by Ed Sullivan
Business positions
Preceded by Daniel E. O'Sullivan	Chair of the Board of the Union Labor Life Insurance Company; 1990–2003	Succeeded by Terence M. O'Sullivan
