= Joseph A. Franklin =

American labor union leader (1868–1948)

Joseph Anthony Franklin (October 31, 1868 – February 18, 1948) was an American labor union leader.

Born in Sedalia, Missouri, Franklin became a boilermaker in 1892. He joined the Brotherhood of Boiler Makers and Iron Ship Builders of America in Pittsburg, Kansas. In 1906, he was elected as vice-president of the union, then in 1908 as its president.

Franklin additionally worked as an organizer for the American Federation of Labor in 1912, and served on the committee of the Conference for Progressive Political Action from 1922 to 1925. He retired in 1944, and died four years later.

Trade union offices
Preceded by George F. Dunn	President of the International Brotherhood of Boilermakers; 1912–1944	Succeeded by Charles J. MacGowan
Preceded by Joseph V. Moreschi; Joseph P. Ryan	American Federation of Labor delegate to the Trades Union Congress; 1932; With: E. E. Milliman	Succeeded by Thomas E. Burke; Christian Madsen
