= Angelo Fosco =

Angelo Fosco (August 27, 1921 – February 11, 1993) was an American labor union leader.

Born in Chicago, Angelo was the son of Peter Fosco, an activist in the Laborers' International Union of North America (LIUNA). He was educated at Morgan Park Academy, and then at Loyola University, before working as an organizer for a LIUNA local. He led a successful organization drive at the Cook County Highway Department before, in 1951, becoming an international representative for the union.

In 1968, Peter Fosco became president of LIUNA, and he appointed Angelo as the union's international vice president, and manager of its Chicago region. In 1975, he succeeded his father as president of the union. As leader of the union, he focused on organizing workers in new areas, such as industrial and hazardous waste, and created the union's National Health and Safety Fund. He also served as a vice-president of the AFL-CIO.

Fosco was accused of conspiring with Tony Accardo of the Chicago Outfit to steal $2 million of union funds, but was acquitted at trial. He died in 1993, still in office.

Trade union offices
Preceded by Peter Fosco	President of the Laborers' International Union of North America; 1975–1993	Succeeded by Arthur Coia
