= Mac A. Fleming =

Mac A. Fleming (born September 22, 1945) is a former American labor union leader.

Born in Walnut Grove, Mississippi, Fleming began working for the Atchison, Topeka and Santa Fe Railway (AT&SF) in 1968, and joined the Brotherhood of Maintenance of Way Employees. He was soon elected as chair of his local union, and then became a system federation officer, serving for six years as general chair of the AT&SF system federation. He was elected as secretary-treasurer of the international union in 1986, and then as president of the union in 1990.

As leader of the union, Fleming campaigned for improved safety and security, protection of workers' rights, and better funding of Amtrak. He undertook the largest example of negotiated rulemaking at the time, producing a proposal to improve safety for rail maintenance workers. In 1995, he was additionally elected as a vice-president of the AFL-CIO. In 2004, he retired, due to poor health.

Trade union offices
Preceded by Geoffrey Zeh	President of the Brotherhood of Maintenance of Way Employees; 1990–2004	Succeeded by Freddie Simpson
