= Joseph V. Moreschi =

Labor union leader

Joseph V. Moreschi (1884 – March 11, 1970) was an Italian-born American labor union leader.

Born in Italy, Moreschi emigrated to the United States with his parents in 1892. They settled in Chicago, and Moreschi later became a laborer. In 1912, he joined the International Hod Carriers, Building and Common Laborers of America. He held various posts in his local union, before in 1921 winning election as a vice-president of the international union.

In 1926, Moreschi was elected as president of the union. Under his leadership, the union absorbed numerous smaller unions, and membership grew from 20,000 to 500,000. He introduced regional offices, a legal department, and a death benefit fund. In 1947, he launched a union newspaper, The Laborer, and became its editor.

Moreschi retired in 1968, moving to Hot Springs, Arkansas, where he died two years later.

Trade union offices
Preceded by Dominick D'Alessandro	President of the International Hod Carriers, Building and Common Laborers of America; 1926–1968	Succeeded by Peter Fosco
Preceded by John J. Manning; Thomas E. Maloy	American Federation of Labor delegate to the Trades Union Congress; 1931; With: Joseph P. Ryan	Succeeded by Joseph A. Franklin; E. E. Milliman
