= Sean McGarvey =

American labor union leader

Sean McGarvey is an American labor union leader.

McGarvey moved with his family to Philadelphia when he was two years old. In 1981, he completed high school and became a glazier. He joined the International Union of Painters and Allied Trades, becoming recording secretary of his local union in 1985, and then business agent in 1994.

In 2005, McGarvey was elected as secretary-treasurer of North America's Building Trades Unions, and in 2012, he won election as its president. As leader of the federation, he focused on increasing the diversity of its membership, and seeing the organization as selling its members' skills to business owners. He attended the Harvard Trade Union Program, and serves as a vice-president of the AFL-CIO. He is also secretary-treasurer of Ullico.

Trade union offices
Preceded by Joseph Maloney	Secretary-Treasurer of North America's Building Trades Unions; 2005–2012	Succeeded by Brent Booker
Preceded by Mark Ayers	President of North America's Building Trades Unions; 2012–present	Incumbent
Business positions
Preceded by Mark Ayers	Secretary-Treasurer of Ullico; 2012–present	Incumbent
