= Tunnel and Subway Constructors' International Union of North America =

Defunct labor union representing American tunnel and subway builders

The Tunnel and Subway Constructors' International Union of North America was a labor union representing workers involved in building tunnels, railroad cuttings, and other features of subways in the United States.

The union was founded on January 19, 1910, by several local unions which had been directly affiliated to the American Federation of Labor (AFL). The new union was similarly chartered by the AFL, and given jurisdiction over the whole of North America. However, it consisted entirely of workers based in New York City, along with its sole branch in New Jersey.

By 1925, the union had 4,000 members. On May 7, 1929, it merged into the International Hod Carriers', Building and Common Laborers' Union of America.

Throughout its existence, the union was led by president Thomas J. Curtis.
