= Arthur Coia =

American labor union leader (1943–2025)

Coia in April 2005

Arthur A. Coia (March 21, 1943 – July 10, 2025) was an American labor union leader.

== Life and career ==
Born in Providence, Rhode Island, Coia's father, Arthur E. Coia, was a prominent activist in the Laborers' International Union of North America (LIUNA). The younger Coia studied at La Salle Academy, Providence College, and Boston University School of Law and practiced as a lawyer.

Coia also became business manager of the Rhode Island Laborers' District Council. In 1981, he was charged, alongside his father, with conspiracy in dealing with union funds. The charges were dropped, and his union career progressed; he became manager of LIUNA's New England and Eastern Canada region, and then in 1989 succeeded his father as secretary-treasurer of the union.

In 1993, Coia was elected as president of the LIUNA. In the role, he was a supporter of Bill Clinton. In addition, he served as a vice-president of the AFL-CIO. While president of the union, he was noted for his collection of luxury cars. He suffered with Hodgkin's disease and prostate cancer, recovering from both. He was accused of ties to organized crime, but a three-year investigation cleared him of the charge. However, he was fined $100,000 for using a union supplier to facilitate purchasing a Ferrari.

Coia retired from his union posts in 1999. In 2001, he founded the Arthur Coia Group, a management and labor relations consultancy.

Coia died on July 10, 2025, at the age of 82.

Trade union offices
Preceded by Arthur E. Coia	Secretary-Treasurer of the Laborers' International Union of North America; 1989–1993	Succeeded by James Norwood
Preceded by Angelo Fosco	President of the Laborers' International Union of North America; 1993–1999	Succeeded by Terence M. O'Sullivan
