= E. E. Milliman =

American labor union leader

Elmer Edward Milliman (November 22, 1890 – January 1, 1947) was an American labor union leader.

Born in Mount Morris, New York, Milliman studied at the Rochester Institute of Technology but left without graduating due to his family's financial situation. He found work as a laborer on the Delaware, Lackawanna and Western Railroad, soon becoming a crew foreman. In 1918, he joined the Brotherhood of Maintenance of Way Employes, and in 1919 he won election as chair of his railroad's division of the union.

In 1922, Milliman was elected as secretary-treasurer of the international union. He was the American Federation of Labor's (AFL) delegate to the British Trades Union Congress in 1932, and from 1938 he served on the AFL's education committee. In 1940, he was elected as president of the union, also serving on the Railway Labor Executives' Association, and various government boards during World War II. In addition, he was president of the Workers' Education Bureau of America, and chair of the Committee on Consumer Co-operatives.

Milliman died on December 31, 1946 still in office.

Trade union offices
| Preceded by Fred Fljozdal | President of the Brotherhood of Maintenance of Way Employes; 1940–1947 | Succeeded by Thomas C. Carroll |
| Preceded by Joseph V. Moreschi; Joseph P. Ryan | American Federation of Labor delegate to the Trades Union Congress; 1932; With: Joseph A. Franklin | Succeeded by Thomas E. Burke; Christian Madsen |
