= Brent Booker =

American labor union leader (born 1975)

Brent Booker (born January 1975) is an American labor union leader.

Booker attended the University of Virginia. He then followed his father and grandfather in joining the Laborers' International Union of North America (LIUNA) in New Albany, Indiana. In 2001, he began working full-time for the union's construction department, and in 2007 was appointed as its director. In 2012, he moved to become secretary-treasurer of North America’s Building Trades Unions, in which role he negotiated numerous contracts. He also served as secretary-treasurer of Helmets to Hardhats, and on the boards of TradesFutures and the Center for Construction Research and Training.

In 2022, Booker returned to LIUNA, becoming special assistant to the president, and also a vice-president of the union. In 2023, he was elected as president of the union. He was also elected as a vice-president of the AFL-CIO.

Booker spoke at the 2024 Democratic National Convention on August 19, 2024.

Trade union offices
Preceded by Sean McGarvey	Secretary-Treasurer of North America's Building Trades Unions; 2012–2022	Succeeded by Brandon Bishop
Preceded by Terence M. O'Sullivan	President of the Laborers' International Union of North America; 2023–present	Succeeded by Incumbent
