= California Unions for Reliable Energy =

Coalition of California labor unions

California Unions for Reliable Energy (CURE) is a coalition of labor unions, mainly affiliated with the State Building & Construction Trades Council of California, that uses California Environmental Quality Act lawsuits (or threats thereof) to force developers of power plants, including new solar and other clean energy projects, to sign "project labor agreements", which require construction be done by union workers.

This practice has been described as "greenmailing".

Using union construction workers has been estimated to increase the cost of renewable energy projects by about 20%.
