= Laborers' International Union of North America =

Trade union

- Abbreviation: LIUNA
- Formation: 1903
- Type: Trade union
- Headquarters: Washington, DC, US
- Locations: Canada; United States
- Members: 557,999 (2013)
- President: Brent Booker
- Secretary-treasurer: Michael F. Sabitoni
- Affiliations: AFL-CIO (North America's Building Trades Unions); Canadian Labour Congress
- Website: liuna.org
- Formerly called: International Hod Carriers and Building Laborers' Union; International Hod Carriers and Common Laborers of America; International Hod Carriers' Building and Common Laborers of America

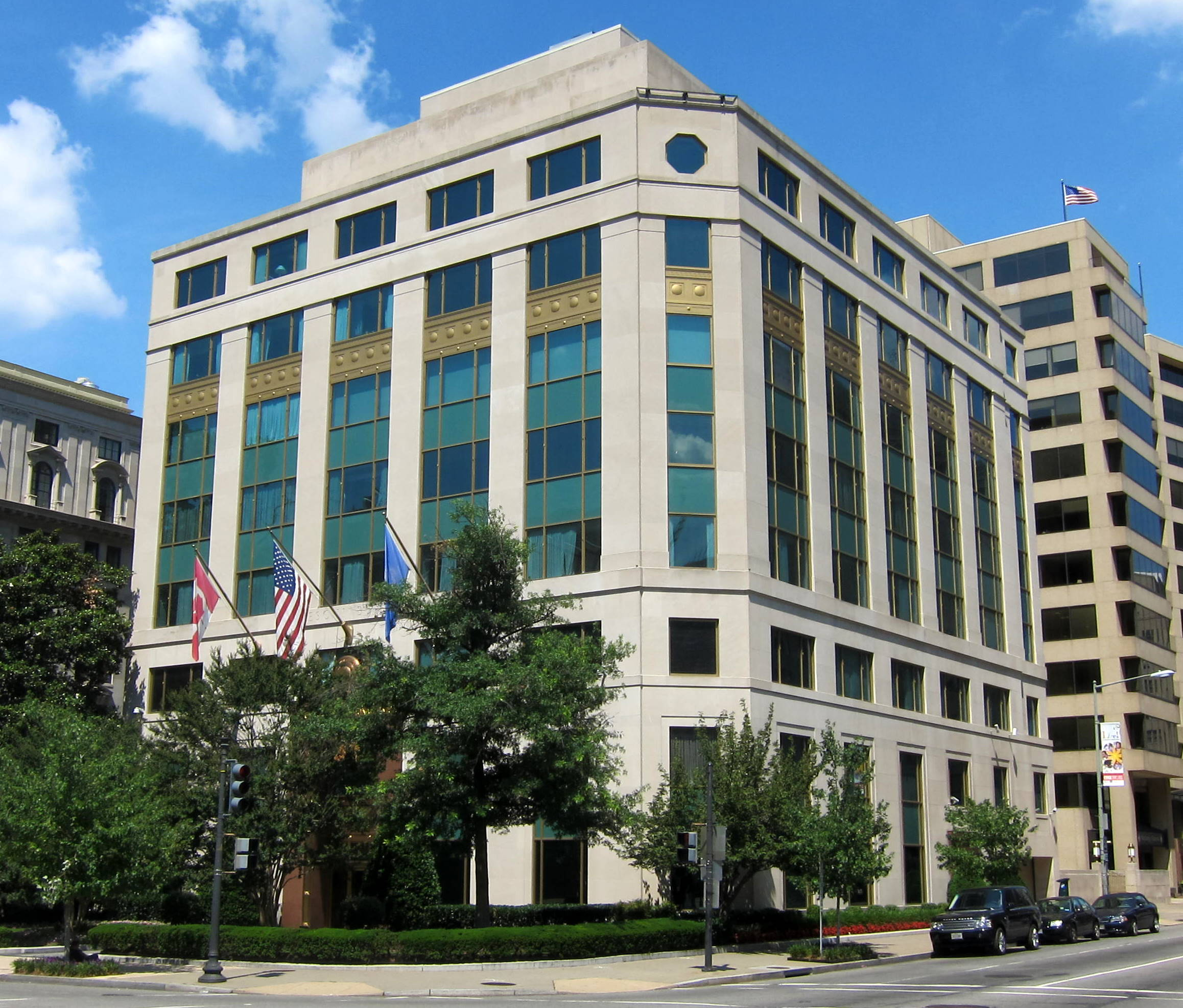
LIUNA's headquarters is in the Moreschi Building in downtown Washington, DC

The Laborers' International Union of North America (LIUNA, stylized as LiUNA!), often shortened to just the Laborers' Union, is an American and Canadian labor union formed in 1903. As of 2017, they had about 500,000 members, about 80,000 of whom are in Canada. The current general president is Brent Booker who was appointed in 2023. There are nine regions across North America; these regions are further divided into 500 local unions. LIUNA Local 183 of Toronto is the largest construction local union in North America, and is led by Joseph Mancinelli.

== History ==
=== 1900–1920 ===
LIUNA's origins stretch back to the 19th century when local construction unions began popping up across the United States. Then, in March 1903, Samuel Gompers, the President of the American Federation of Labor (AFL), successfully persuaded various local construction unions from across the US to unite in order to consolidate power in their fight against unfair labor practices.

As a result, on April 13, 1903, the International Hod Carriers and Building Laborers' Union (IHC and BLC) was established at its founding convention in Washington, DC. At the convention there were 25 delegates from 23 unions in 17 different cities in attendance. During the course of the convention the delegates elected a General President, Herman Lilien, a General Secretary-Treasurer, Harold Stemburgh, and adopted a Declaration of Principles. Also, the delegates were able to produce the union's first charter, which claimed jurisdiction over:

Wrecking of buildings, excavations of buildings, digging of trenches, piers and foundations, holes, digging, lagging, sheeting of said foundations, holes, and caisson work, concrete for buildings, whether foundations, floors or any other, whether done by hand or any other process, tending to masons, mixing and handling all materials used by masons (except stone setters), building of centers for fireproofing purposes, tending to carpenters, tending to and mixing of all materials for plastering, whether done by hand or any other process, clearing of debris from buildings, shoring, underpinning and raising of old buildings, drying of plastering, when done by salamander heat, handling of dimension stones.

Nine years later, in 1912, the IHC and BLC experiences two name changes. First, in September, the union's name was changed to the International Hod Carriers and Common Laborers of America. Then, in December, the name was changed again to the International Hod Carriers' Building and Common Laborers of America.

During the early 20th century, the union achieved considerable wage raises for members in Pittsburgh, New York City, New York and Chicago, and orchestrated strikes in Boston, St. Louis and Philadelphia. By 1920, membership had climbed to 96,000. The union backed calls by African-American workers to be allowed full and equal status as union members, denying permission for segregated unions to be founded in Kansas City and Cincinnati.

=== 1921–1940 ===
In 1929, the union expanded to include the Tunnel and Subway Constructors' International Union of North America. Then, eight years later, the union expanded again to include the International Union of Pavers, Rammermen, Flag Layers, Bridge and Stone Curb Setters and Sheet Asphalt Pavers. However, during the Great Depression of the 1930s, membership fell to under 30,000 as more and more people lost their jobs.

In 1940, the union moved its international headquarters from Massachusetts to Washington, DC. Also, in October of that year, union dues were suspended in support of the United States's impending involvement in WWII.

=== 1941–1960 ===
By 1942, despite the decline in union membership during the early years of the Great Depression, membership climbed back up to more than 400,000 – over half of which left their jobs to serve in World War II. In September 1946, at the general convention in Chicago, the union created a monthly journal called The Laborer. However, the first issue of The Laborer was not published until June 1947. A few months later, in September, the union signed its first national pipeline agreement, which protected wages, benefits, and safety conditions for pipeline workers.

During the 1950s, the union made significant gains concerning health and welfare benefits. For example, in 1956, laborers in Pittsburgh were able to form pension plans. Also, in 1955, the union helped establish the National Joint Heavy and Highway Construction Committee. The purpose of the committee was to ensure that union members could take advantage of the jobs created by the Interstate Highway Act of 1954.

=== 1961–1980 ===
In 1962, the Laborers met with President John F. Kennedy at the White House to pledge not to discriminate when hiring. Later, after President Kennedy was assassinated, the union went back to the White House yet again, this time to pledge support for President Lyndon B. Johnson's War on Poverty. Union members even participated in Martin Luther King Jr.'s 1963 March on Washington for Jobs and Freedom. In 1965, the union was renamed the Laborers' International Union of North America (LIUNA). A year later, LIUNA created the Laborers' Political League in order to both influence politics and encourage its members to participate in the political process. In 1968, the union expanded to include over 60,000 new workers from the National Association of Post Office Mail Handlers, Watchmen, Messengers and Group Leaders. Also, the Journeyman Stone Cutters' Association of North America joined with the union as well.

During the 1970s, LIUNA continued to push for improved education and training for its workers despite a slowdown in construction projects. For instance, in 1971, LIUNA's Laborers – Associated General Contractors Fund completed a film and held its first national training conference. In addition, LIUNA helped hospital workers organize under the AFL–CIO's Public Employee Department in 1974. Also in that year, LIUNA signed a national agreement with Bricklayers and Masonry contractors. In 1976, LIUNA began training women to work in construction with funds from the Comprehensive Employment and Training Act. Other notable achievements for LIUNA during the 1970s were newly established pension plans in central and southern states, legal services for members of Louisiana local 229, and a vision center for members in Massachusetts.

=== 1981–2000 ===
In 1981, LIUNA locals in New York sought to improve their benefits by offering drug and alcohol rehabilitation programs. Also, in that same year, LIUNA created the New England Laborers' Training Academy (NELTA). The purpose of NELTA was to spread awareness of the dangers of asbestos and teach union members how to safely remove it. Then, six years later, LIUNA signed a national agreement with the Asbestos Abatement Contractors Association ensuring safer working conditions for all its members. Two years prior to that, the union won another significant victory when the Department of Labor formally recognized highway flaggers as members of LIUNA. This was important because it gave the highway flaggers better protection for their wages. In 1988, LIUNA established the Laborers' Health and Safety Fund of North America, which was a co-venture between labor and management to help improved health and safety for workers. One year later, LIUNA locals in Baltimore and Washington, DC, followed the example set by New York unions and instituted drug and alcohol rehabilitation programs. These programs have since been expanded to unions across the rest of America.

During the 1990s, LIUNA experienced a number of new organizing initiatives to improve and expand the union. By 1994, the United States Department of Labor had recognized construction as an apprenticeable occupation, which allowed LIUNA to establish its own apprenticeship program. In 1998, LIUNA created its Public Employee Department. As a result, LIUNA added approximately 5,200 Riverside, California County workers along members of the Canadian Licensed Practical Nurses Association.

Branches of the LIUNA were found to have been infiltrated by organized crime in the 1990s. In one particular case, the Buffalo, New York wing of the Italian mafia controlled Local 210 of the LIUNA for decades. A protracted investigation into the union's operations over the course of a decade eventually drove the crime family out of the union by 2006.

=== 2001–present ===
In 2001, members of the LIUNA participated in the clean up at Ground Zero in New York following the September 11 terrorist attacks. In 2003, the same year the Laborers' Union celebrated its 100th anniversary, it also spearheaded the creation of its first construction charter school. The Cranston Public Schools Construction and Career Academy is a high school that teaches students about the construction industry and how to get into it. At the 2011 convention, LIUNA passed several resolutions to help invest in political activism through the organization's political action committee (PAC).

On June 1, 2006, O'Sullivan announced that LIUNA had disaffiliated from the AFL–CIO and joined the Change to Win Federation. However, LIUNA officials said on August 13, 2010, that the union would leave Change to Win and rejoin the AFL–CIO in October 2010.

In May 2016, in the midst of the 2016 United States presidential election, LIUNA donated US$1 million to Priorities USA Action, a SuperPAC which supports Democratic candidate Hillary Clinton's 2016 presidential campaign.

== Membership ==
According to LIUNA's Department of Labor records since 2005, when membership classifications were first reported, the union's membership has been in a slow decline across all categories except "retired" members, which reports a slight increase during the period. The most drastic decline, by over half, has been in "mail handlers associate" members, which is the second largest category of members and the only category reported as ineligible to vote in the union. LIUNA contracts also cover some non-members, known as agency fee payers, which since 2006 have numbered comparatively less than 1% of the size of the union's membership. Agency fee payers have also fallen by about half of its reported number, although comparatively marginal throughout. As of 2013 this accounts for about 90,000 "mail handler associates" (16%), 68,000 "retirees" (12%) and 38,000 "mail handler regulars" (7%), plus less than 2,000 non-members paying agency fees, compared to about 362,000 "regular" members (65%).

View source data.
View source data.

== Leadership ==
=== Presidents ===
1903: Herman Lilien
1905: Michael Knipfer
1905: August Palutze
1906: John Breen
1908: Dominic D'Alessandro
1926: Joseph V. Moreschi
1968: Peter Fosco
1975: Angelo Fosco
1993: Arthur A. Coia
2000: Terence M. O'Sullivan
2023: Brent Booker

=== Secretary-Treasurers ===
1903: Harold Stemburgh
1907: Jacob Talezaar
1907: Earnest Villiard
1910: Achilles Persion
1950: Peter Fosco
1968: Terence J. O'Sullivan
1979: Arthur E. Coia
1989: Arthur A. Coia
1993: James Norwood
1994: Bud Vinall
1998: Carl E. Booker
2001: Armand E. Sabitoni
2023: Michael F. Sabitoni

== Sports sponsorships ==
LIUNA sponsors three NASCAR races within different divisions — The LiUNA! in the O'Reilly Auto Parts Series at Las Vegas Motor Speedway; the LiUNA! 150 in the Craftsman Truck Series at Lime Rock Park; and another 150-lap race in the ARCA Menards Series at Lucas Oil Indianapolis Raceway Park. It also previously sponsored the LiUNA! 175, a Truck Series race at the Milwaukee Mile.

The union has held the naming rights for the LIUNA 4 Ice Centre in Hamilton, Ontario, Canada since 2025.

== See also ==
- LIUNA Station
- National Postal Mail Handlers Union
