= California Environmental Quality Act =

Law requiring review and disclosure of environmental impacts of land development

California State Legislature
- Full name: California Environmental Quality Act
- Acronym: CEQA
- Governor: Ronald Reagan
- Section: CA Pub Res Code §21000 et seq.

Status: Current legislation

The California Environmental Quality Act (CEQA /ˈsiː.kwə/) is a California statute passed in 1970 and signed in to law by then-governor Ronald Reagan, shortly after the United States federal government passed the National Environmental Policy Act (NEPA), to institute a statewide policy of environmental protection. CEQA does not directly regulate land uses, but instead requires state and local agencies within California to follow a protocol of analysis and public disclosure of environmental impacts of proposed projects and, in a departure from NEPA, adopt all feasible measures to mitigate those impacts. CEQA makes environmental protection a mandatory part of every California state and local (public) agency's decision making process.

In 1972, the California Supreme Court broadened CEQA by interpreting a "public" project as any development that needed government approval. Since then, CEQA has become the basis for anyone with a grievance against a project to file lawsuits to slow projects by years or kill projects by imposing delays and litigation costs that make projects infeasible.

CEQA has contributed to the California housing shortage. It has been criticized for being abused (used for reasons other than environmental ones) to block, downsize, delay, or gain other concessions from new development. CEQA has even been used to block or delay projects that have positive environmental impacts, such as solar plants, wind turbines, bike lanes on pre-existing roads, and denser housing. One study found that 85% of CEQA lawsuits were filed by organizations with no record of environmental advocacy and 80% of CEQA lawsuits targeted infill development. CEQA has also been used by NIMBYs to block homeless shelters, student housing and affordable housing projects, by businesses to try to block competition, and by unions to force developers to use union workers.

All governors since 1983 (George Deukmejian, Pete Wilson, Gray Davis, Arnold Schwarzenegger, and Jerry Brown), as well as current governor Gavin Newsom, have stated that CEQA needs to be reformed. In 2025, the state legislature passed two bills, with bipartisan support, that exempted various types of developments from CEQA environmental review, including most urban infill housing development.

== History ==
CEQA was signed into law in 1970 by governor Ronald Reagan, in a time of increasing public concern for the environment, caused by events such as the 1969 Cuyahoga River Fire. The statute required that for any "public" project, the government must conduct an environmental study to examine what impacts the project might have on things like air/water quality, noise, or nature, and then generate an EIR (Environmental Impact Report) documenting all these impacts as well as potential and planned mitigations. Fifteen other states followed California, generally modelling their laws after California's law.

However, in a departure from other states, in 1972 state courts interpreted a "public" project as any development that needed government approval. As of 2021, this application of the law is unique to California.

By 2021, the CEQA guidelines, which explain how CEQA reviews must be handled, had grown from an initial 10 page checklist to over 500 pages, including issues such as aesthetics.

=== National Environmental Policy Act ===
NEPA, a United States federal statute passed the year before CEQA, is similar to CEQA in that both statutes set forth a policy of environmental protection, and a protocol by which all agencies in their respective jurisdictions make environmental protection part of their decision making process.

NEPA is narrower in scope than CEQA. NEPA applies only to projects receiving federal funding or approval by federal agencies, while CEQA applies to projects receiving any form of state or local approval, permit, or oversight. Thus, development projects in California funded only by private sources and not requiring approval by a federal agency would be exempt from NEPA, but would likely be subject to CEQA.

The environmental impact statement (EIS) required under NEPA and the EIR required under CEQA are similar documents, yet have some crucial differences. For example, under NEPA, an agency can list all reasonable alternatives and their impacts, then choose their preferred project without regard to the severity of its impacts, even if it is more harmful to the environment. Under CEQA, the lead agency is required to mitigate all "significant" adverse environmental impacts to "the maximum extent feasible" and can approve a project only if the agency adopts a Statement of Overriding Considerations detailing the specific overriding economic, legal, social, technological, or other considerations that outweigh the project's significant, unavoidable impacts. If a major federal project, or project using federal funds is seeking approval in California, its lead agency must prepare both an EIS and an EIR, but both can be combined into one document (since the EIS and EIR have the same elements for the most part). Said document, however, must be processed through both the CEQA and NEPA approval steps.

=== 2025 reform bills ===
The California State Legislature, 2025–2026 session, passed bills AB 130 and SB 131 as part of the annual budgeting process; these bills exempt certain kinds of development, such as infill housing, advanced manufacturing in industrial districts, high-speed rail, and wildfire mitigation, from CEQA review.

== Policy ==
The CEQA statute, California Public Resources Code § 21000 et seq., codifies a statewide policy of environmental protection. According to the act, all state and local agencies must give major consideration to environmental protection in regulating public and private activities, and should not approve projects for which there exist feasible and environmentally superior mitigation measures or alternatives.

== CEQA process overview ==
CEQA mandates actions all state and local agencies must take to advance that policy. Specifically, for any project under CEQA's jurisdiction with potentially significant environmental impacts, agencies must identify mitigation measures and alternatives by preparing an Environmental Impact Report, and must approve projects with feasible mitigation measures and the environmentally superior alternative. The California Natural Resources Agency promulgates the CEQA Guidelines, California Code of Regulations Title 14 § 15000 et seq., which detail the protocol by which state and local agencies comply with CEQA requirements. Appendix A of the CEQA Guidelines summarizes this protocol in flowchart form. CEQA originally applied to only public projects, but California Supreme Court interpretation of the statute, as well as later revisions to the wording, have expanded the CEQA's jurisdiction to nearly all projects within California, including those accomplished by private businesses and individuals. § 21002.1: "Each public agency shall mitigate or avoid the significant effects on the environment of projects that it carries out or approves whenever it is feasible to do so." For private projects, CEQA applies when a discretionary government permit or other entitlement for use is necessary.

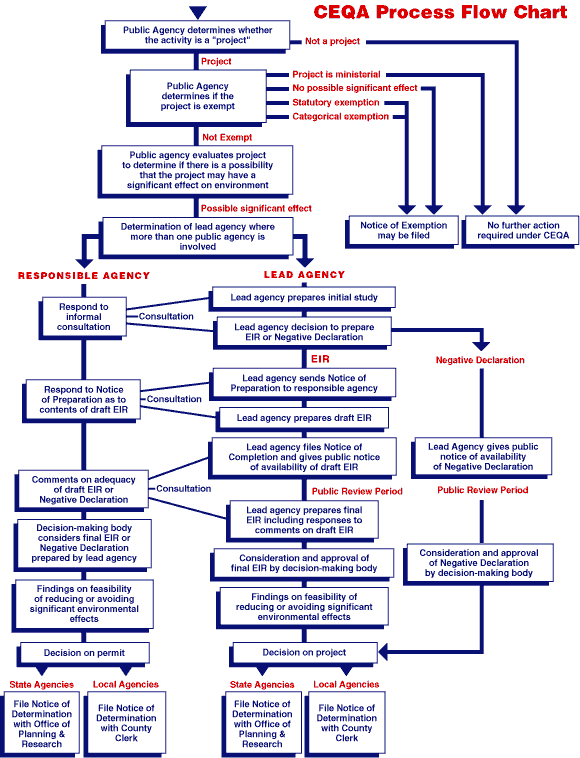
CEQA Process Flow Chart

=== Lead agency and responsible agencies ===
1. Lead Agency: The lead agency is responsible for conducting the CEQA review and has final approval of the project. They are responsible for coordinating with the project applicant, public and associated agencies during the CEQA process. When more than one agency is involved in a project, the agency with primary responsibility for approving a project is the lead agency, for purposes of following the CEQA protocol.
2. Responsible Agency: Other agencies with discretionary approval power over the project are called "responsible agencies". The lead agency has an obligation to consult with these agencies during the CEQA process to ensure their input is accounted for. Responsible agencies often have a vested interest in a specific environmental resource that they are charged with regulating.
3. Trustee Agency: An agency with jurisdiction over a resource held in trust for the people. This agency has no approval power over a project.

=== Initial study ===
If a project is not exempt from CEQA, a lead agency can conduct an initial study to preliminarily assess project impacts. Appendix G of the CEQA Guidelines lists types of environmental impacts to consider in checklist form. This initial study guides the lead agency to prepare either a negative declaration, mitigated negative declaration, or environmental impact report depending on the impact assessment. The initial study completion also gives the project applicant opportunity to change their project scope early in the CEQA process if the initial study indicates significant impact(s) are likely. If the lead agency determines the project clearly has significant impacts, they can skip the initial study phase and immediately conduct an Environmental Impact Report.

=== Thresholds of significance ===
Under CEQA, every agency in the state "is encouraged to develop and publish thresholds of significance" against which to compare the environmental impacts of projects. Such thresholds are to be published for public review and supported by substantial evidence before their adoption. A lead agency will normally consider the environmental impacts of a project to be significant if and only if they exceed established thresholds of significance. According to a 2001 survey, however, few agencies have actually developed thresholds of significance. The survey's analysts wondered, "if most agencies are not developing thresholds and publishing them for public review, then what criteria are they using?". In absence of thresholds of significance developed independently by lead agencies, impact assessments apply the significant criteria detailed in Appendix G, Environmental Checklist, of the CEQA Statutes and Guidelines, which is produced by the California Office of Planning and Research (OPR). Lead agencies can also defer to authority agencies that publish their recommended guidelines for the resources they regulate. Examples of this include the California Department of Conservation has threshold tests for assessing impacts to agricultural resources using the LESA model, and the Bay Area Air Quality Management District has published guidelines for air quality impacts.

== Environmental impact analysis ==
The lead agency must analyze project impacts to 18 different environmental resource factors detailed in Appendix G during their CEQA review.

Resource factors (in alphabetical order):

- Aesthetics
- Agriculture and Forestry Resources
- Air Quality
- Biological Resources
- Cultural Resources
- Energy
- Geology and Soils
- Hazards and Hazardous Materials
- Hydrology and Water Quality
- Land Use and Planning
- Mineral Resources
- Noise
- Population and Housing
- Public Services
- Recreation
- Transportation
- Tribal Cultural Resources
- Utilities and Service Systems
- Wildfire
- Mandatory Findings of Significance

=== Greenhouse gas emissions ===
Greenhouse gas emissions were not required to be analyzed as an impact to the environment when CEQA was originally adopted. The scientific community has since attributed greenhouse gases to climate change and resulting negative impacts to humans and the environment. The Intergovernmental Panel on Climate Change (IPCC) issued a report in 2007 stating that human activities are responsible for increased global temperatures. As a result of these assessments, the California Legislature passed Assembly Bill 32, the Global Warming Solutions Act of 2006 that mandated greenhouse gas emissions be reduced to 1990 levels by 2020. This assembly of legislation and evidence of environmental impact led to California enacting requirements for lead agencies to consider greenhouse gas emissions in their CEQA reviews.

The State Air Resources Board or California Air Resources Board is the state agency charged with monitoring and regulating sources of greenhouse gas emissions under AB32. California's 35 local air pollution control districts (APCDs) and air quality management districts (AQMDs) are the agencies primarily responsible for regulating stationary sources of air pollution. These air districts traditionally provide guidance to lead agencies, such as counties, cities and public utilities, on the evaluation of air pollutants under CEQA.

==== Analysis approach ====
The lead agency is the public agency which has the principal responsibility for approving a proposed project. The lead agency determines which type of environmental document will be prepared (Mitigated Negative Declaration, Environmental Impact Report, etc.) and has discretion to adopt significance criteria more conservative than those required by CEQA. §15064.4 provides a lead agency discretion to determine which type of analysis approach to utilize for a given project level GHG analysis:

"(1) Use a model or methodology to quantify greenhouse gas emissions resulting from a project, and which model or methodology to use. The lead agency has discretion to select the model or methodology it considers most appropriate provided it supports its decision with substantial evidence. The lead agency should explain the limitations of the particular model or methodology selected for use; and/or

(2) Rely on a qualitative analysis or performance based standards."

The lead agency is charged with making a good-faith effort to "describe, calculate, or estimate the amount of greenhouse gas emissions resulting from a project".

Lifecycle analysis of GHG includes the full aggregate quantity of GHG generated from the extraction, production, distribution and use of energy or fuel. If a lead agency had to complete a GHG lifecycle analysis under CEQA, they would have to quantify GHGs produced not only within the spatial boundary of the project site, but GHGs generated from transportation of products to the site and product supply chain production emissions. Several of these energy emissions could be produced overseas leading to difficulty by the lead agency in verification and enforcement of emission thresholds. CEQA guidance currently does not require lifecycle analysis of GHG emissions since the term is not well defined and too speculative, and the Office of Planning and Research (OPR) removed the term "Life Cycle" from CEQA guidelines in 2010. If any portion of the analysis is considered speculative by the lead agency and not supported by defensible and quantifiable scientific evidence, the impact must be eliminated pursuant to CEQA Guidelines 15145.

Thresholds of significance can be determined by reference of air quality management district CEQA guidelines, although the ultimate discretion for thresholds remains with the lead agency.

== Level of environmental review ==
Projects may be exempt from CEQA if they are ministerial in nature, have been exempted by the California Legislature through a statutory exemption, or fall within any of the classes of exemption by category that CEQA recognizes that do not have a significant impact on the environment. If the lead agency determines the project could have no significant environmental impacts after completing an initial study, no EIR will be necessary, but the lead agency must still prepare a Negative Declaration that discloses the impact analysis. If the project could have significant environmental impacts, but the lead agency has incorporated mitigation measures to lower those impacts to less than significant, no EIR will be necessary, but the lead agency must prepare a Mitigated Negative Declaration that demonstrates how all identified significant impacts will be mitigated to below the level of significance. Finally, if the lead agency determines the project may have significant environmental impacts, the lead agency must prepare an EIR.

=== Ministerial decision ===
CEQA applies to any action when a project requires discretionary approval by a state or local governmental body. Projects may also require ministerial permits that must comply with general plans and local ordinances such as building permits or marriage licenses. These decisions cannot be denied and provides the governmental body with no judgement as long as the proponent meets the specifications detailed in the permit or license requirements. CEQA does not apply when only ministerial approval is necessary.

=== Statutory exemptions ===
The California state legislature has, on occasion, abrogated CEQA such that specific projects or types of projects could proceed without an EIR. One such abrogation occurred in October 2009, with the passage of a union-backed law exempting the proposed construction of Los Angeles Stadium from CEQA's requirements. The abrogation mooted an ongoing lawsuit, brought by eight residents of a neighboring city, challenging the validity of the developer's EIR. The developer had originally prepared an EIR for a commercial development on the site, then prepared a supplemental EIR to include a proposed 75,000 seat stadium situated within 3,000 feet of homes in that neighboring city; the plaintiffs argued that a single new EIR studying the entire project was required. State officials said the abrogation ended an abuse of CEQA by individuals seeking to obstruct the project; at the signing ceremony, Governor Arnold Schwarzenegger said he would "terminate the frivolous lawsuit." A plaintiff in the lawsuit said the abrogation "opens up the door for other developers... to hire lobbyists... and get exemptions from the environmental laws." An environmental lawyer said that the slow economy would probably encourage developers to seek more abrogations, as legislators become more eager to stimulate job growth.

=== Categorical exemptions ===
Several categorical exemptions for projects are listed under Title 14 of the California Code of Regulations, Chapter 3, Article 19. These exemptions cover projects that do pose a significant impact to the environment and fit within the description of the several categories listed under Article 19. A common categorical exemption used by agencies is 15301 for maintenance of existing facilities. Since the project is already built, the project often has no significant new impacts. Agencies do not have to file any CEQA findings for categorically exempt projects. They can be legally challenged by the public on whether the project must undergo CEQA. The lead agency can file a Notice of Exemption (NOE) to trigger a 35-day statute of limitations period for legal challenge or, if no NOE is filed, a 180-day statute of limitations applies.

=== Negative Declaration (ND) / Mitigated Negative Declaration (MND) ===
After the initial study is completed, the lead agency can then determine if the project could have a significant impact on the environment. The lead agency must propose mitigation measures to reduce any impacts to less than significant "to the maximum extent feasible". The lead agency then prepares a draft Negative Declaration (ND) or Mitigated Negative Declaration (MND) and publishes the document for public review for at least 21 days. After comments are considered, the lead agency can either recirculate the ND/MND if public comments required the project scope to substantially change, or the lead agency can adopt the document. The Lead agency must file a Notice of Determination (NOD) after adopting the document with a 30-day statute of limitations for legal challenge. If the lead agency is presented with a fair argument that shows substantial evidence of the project having a significant environmental impact after mitigation measures are exhausted, the lead agency is required to prepare an Environmental Impact Report. Thus, in essence, an ND/MND may only be used to satisfy CEQA requirements for projects with no significant unmitigated adverse environmental impacts (ND) or for which all potentially significant adverse impacts have been "avoided, reduced or minimized" to below the threshold of significance (MND). If significant impacts remain, an EIR must be prepared and a Statement of Overriding Considerations are necessary.

=== Environmental Impact Report (EIR) ===
According to case law, the environmental impact report (EIR) is at "the heart of CEQA". An EIR serves to inform governmental agencies and the public of a project's environmental impacts. Further, an EIR is required to propose mitigations and alternatives which may reduce or avoid any significant adverse environmental impacts; as the EIR is considered the heart of CEQA, mitigation and alternatives are considered the heart of the EIR. One alternative that a lead agency must usually consider is the no project alternative, that is, cancellation of the project, with the future instead unfolding according to existing plans (i.e., the status quo). Among all the alternatives, the EIR identifies the environmentally superior alternative; if the environmentally superior alternative is the no project alternative, the EIR identifies the environmentally superior alternative among the other alternatives.

The EIR process begins with the circulation of a Notice of Preparation (NOP) which informs the public, responsible agencies, trustee agencies, and the OPR that an EIR will be prepared for a given project. The NOP must include sufficient project description details and likely environmental effects such that agencies and public citizens can provide meaningful comments on the proposed project for analysis in the EIR. The NOP comment period is no shorter than 30 days. After preparation of the draft EIR, a Notice of Completion (NOC) must be submitted to the Office of Planning and Research which includes project location, location of review copies, and public comment review period information. The lead agency must provide public notice of the draft EIR at the same time it issues the NOC. This notice must include the location of any public meetings intended to solicit comments on the draft EIR. If the draft EIR is circulated through the State Clearinghouse, then the public comment period must be 45 days minimum. The lead agency must prepare a final EIR before approving the project. The contents of a final EIR are specified in §15132 of the CEQA guidelines, but responses to draft EIR comments are the focus of the document. The lead agency then certifies the final EIR and issues its findings. Should significant and unavoidable impacts remain after mitigation, a Statement of Overriding Considerations must be prepared. Finally, the lead agency may decide whether or how to approve or carry out the project at which time a notice of determination (NOD) must be filed within five days of approval. Appeal periods and litigation avenues remain after the NOD.

== Litigation ==
CEQA's broad scope and lack of clear thresholds often lead to litigation, both by groups that support development, and individuals and agencies opposing such development.

CEQA plaintiffs such as community and environmental groups often challenge projects with negative declarations, on the grounds that EIRs should have been carried out. Litigation also occurs on the grounds that EIRs are too brief or overlooked possible impacts, as there are no guidelines for the length or content of the EIRs.

Plaintiffs also sometimes accuse developers of a practice called piece-mealing, by which projects are analyzed incrementally by parts to make the environmental impacts appear smaller to the overseeing agency.

CEQA plaintiffs succeeded on one such claim in June 2009, concerning an expansion of the Chevron Richmond Refinery, the largest employer in Richmond, California. The judge ruled that Chevron erred by defining the project inconsistently, and the city of Richmond erred in allowing Chevron to piece-meal its project, and in allowing Chevron to develop a mitigation plan after the project begins. The judge consequently ruled the EIR to be insufficient to meet CEQA's requirements, ordering the preparation of a new EIR covering the whole, accurately defined project before the refinery's expansion could proceed.

=== Settlements ===
Plaintiffs in CEQA lawsuits seek various forms of redress, such as amending the EIR, preparing a new EIR, agreeing to mitigation measures, or paying money to local agencies to offset environmental impacts.

== Criticisms ==
A 2015 study by the environmental and land-use law firm Holland & Knight, looking at all CEQA lawsuits filed during the three-year period 2010–2012, found that less than 15% were filed by groups with prior records of environmental advocacy. Instead, CEQA lawsuits (and threats of CEQA lawsuits) are frequently used by groups that want to block a proposed project for reasons other than its environmental impacts. In one case, anti-abortion activists filed a CEQA lawsuit to try to block Planned Parenthood from establishing a reproductive health clinic in an already constructed office building in San Francisco. The activists cited the noise caused by their own protests as the environmental impact requiring mitigation. This lawsuit delayed the clinic's tenancy by at least 18 months.

A report by the California Legislative Analyst's Office found that in the state's 10 largest cities, CEQA appeals delayed projects by an average of two and a half years.

CEQA's requirement that automobile congestion be considered as an "environmental impact" that must be mitigated has resulted in the law both preventing the creation of bicycle lanes on already existing streets and allowing lawsuits challenging new bike lanes before and even after they have passed environmental review and been created.

According to the Hoover Institution, environmentalists that are hostile to development can use CEQA as a "NIMBY" shield, dragging developers to court. Developers can use the law as a means of choking a rival's business. Labor interests use it as a form of legalized extortion to give them better terms so they don't invoke a CEQA delay.

=== Use by NIMBYs to attempt to block housing ===
Carol Galante, a professor at the UC Berkeley College of Environmental Design and former Assistant Secretary for the U.S. Department of Housing and Urban Development, stated that CEQA "has been abused in this state for 30 years by people who use it when it has nothing to do with an environmental reason, ... NIMBY-ism is connected to the fact that for everyone who owns their little piece of the dream, there's no reason to want development next door to them, CEQA gives them a tool to effectuate their interest ... We need to fundamentally rethink how the CEQA process works in this state."

CEQA has been used by residents in San Francisco and Los Angeles to attempt to block homeless shelters and affordable housing projects from being located in their neighborhoods.

While environmental groups largely agree that building dense housing in urban areas (infill development) is better for the environment than converting open space to new homes, 4 out of 5 CEQA lawsuits target infill development projects; only 20% of CEQA lawsuits target greenfield projects that would convert open space to housing.

In 2022, the potential impact of a larger incoming undergraduate class, based on hypothetical noise produced by students, combined with lack of timely environmental review, resulted in a successful lawsuit and court injunction against UC Berkeley. The university said it might have to rescind admission to about a third of its incoming students, but in the end successfully lobbied the state legislature to modify the law to give it more time to perform the required review.

In 2022, CEQA was used by the San Francisco Board of Supervisors to block the creation of 500 homes on a site next to a Bay Area Rapid Transit station that is currently occupied by a parking lot.

=== Use by businesses to attempt to block competition ===
Businesses have used the law to try to block competition. In one case a developer (Olen Properties Corp, owned by Igor Olenicoff) sued under CEQA to try to prevent another developer from building a 300 unit apartment complex adjacent to Olen's buildings.

In another case, Conquest Student Housing, which owns 17 residential rental buildings near USC, sued competitor Urban Partners using CEQA to stop their development of a new 1,600 unit housing complex. Conquest then proceeded to file similar lawsuits against other projects by Urban Partners in other state locations and one in Washington state under that state's environmental law, but dropped their lawsuits after Urban Partners responded with a federal racketeering lawsuit.

In another example in San Jose, when the Moe's Stop gas station added an additional island with four more pumps, they were sued under CEQA by the competing gas station on the same street corner, Gas & Shop, who claimed that the negative environmental impact would be increased traffic, even though the City had approved the project.

=== Use by labor unions to require union construction workers ===
Labor unions file CEQA lawsuits against projects to try to force them to pay prevailing wage and/or hire union workers.

California Unions for Reliable Energy is a coalition of labor unions, mainly affiliated with the State Building & Construction Trades Council of California, that uses CEQA lawsuits (or threats thereof) to force developers of power plants, including new solar and other clean energy projects, to sign "project labor agreements", which require construction be done by union workers. This practice has been described as "greenmailing", and has been estimated to increase the cost of renewable energy projects by about 20%.

=== Governors' statements ===
While CEQA's original intent must remain intact, now is the time to end reckless abuses of this important law – abuses that are threatening California's economic vitality, costing jobs and wasting valuable taxpayer dollars. ... Today, CEQA is too often abused by those seeking to gain a competitive edge, to leverage concessions from a project or by neighbors who simply don't want any new growth in their community – no matter how worthy or environmentally beneficial a project may be. - Former Governors George Deukmejian, Pete Wilson, and Gray Davis in a 2013 editorial in The Sacramento Bee

In 2010, in his signing message for two minor CEQA reform laws, Governor Arnold Schwarzenegger said:

[While these bills modify CEQA in] "the right direction, neither I nor the Legislature should fool ourselves into thinking that these bills even make a dent in the problems caused by CEQA's spaghetti-like requirements." and "Next year's crop of state lawmakers, including the next administration, will again face the unique challenge of reining in CEQA abuses in the face of blind opposition determined to maintain an unworkable status quo."

Governor Jerry Brown called CEQA reform "the Lord's work". In an interview with UCLA's Blueprint magazine, he commented on the use of CEQA for other than environmental reasons:

"But it's easier to build in Texas. It is. And maybe we could change that. But you know what? The trouble is the political climate, that's just kind of where we are. Very hard to — you can't change CEQA. [...] The unions won't let you because they use it as a hammer to get project labor agreements. The environmentalists like it because it's the people's document that you have to disclose all the impacts. And, of course, the developers have a problem because "impact," boy, that's a big word. Everything's an impact. I pound on the table, that's an impact [POUNDING ON THE TABLE]. You know what I mean?"

In 2023, after an appeals court blocked construction of additional student housing at UC Berkeley stating that it would have environmental impacts which require mitigation, Governor Gavin Newsom stated:

"Our CEQA process is clearly broken when a few wealthy Berkeley homeowners can block desperately needed student housing...California cannot afford to be held hostage by NIMBYs."

== See also ==
- 1970 in the environment
- California Environmental Protection Agency
