= North America's Building Trades Unions =

Department of the US trade union center AFL–CIO

- Building and Construction Trades Department
- Abbreviation: NABTU
- Formation: November 11, 1907; 119 years ago
- Type: Trade department of a trade union center
- Headquarters: Washington, DC, US
- Locations: United States; Canada
- Members: 14 affiliated unions (2018)
- President: Sean McGarvey
- Parent organization: AFL–CIO
- Website: nabtu.org
- Formerly called: Department of Building Trades

The Building and Construction Trades Department (BCTD), commonly known as North America's Building Trades Unions (NABTU), is a trade department of the American Federation of Labor and Congress of Industrial Organizations (AFL–CIO) with 14 affiliated labor unions in the building trades. It was originally founded by the American Federation of Labor in 1907.

== History ==
North America's Building Trades Unions was founded by the American Federation of Labor (AFL) at its November 1907 Convention in Norfolk, Virginia, as a Department of Building Trades. In 1937, its name was changed to Building and Construction Trades Department of the American Federation of Labor--Congress of Industrial Organizations.

== Affiliates ==
North America's Building Trades Unions is a labor federation of 14 North American unions in the building trade. Affiliates are the International Brotherhood of Electrical Workers (IBEW), International Brotherhood of Teamsters (Teamsters), International Union of Bricklayers and Allied Craftworkers (BAC), International Union of Elevator Constructors (IUEC), International Union of Painters and Allied Trades (IUPAT), Laborers’ International Union of North America (LIUNA), Operative Plasterers' and Cement Masons' International Association (OPCMIA), International Association of Sheet Metal, Air, Rail and Transportation Workers (SMART), United Association (UA), United Union of Roofers, Waterproofers and Allied Workers (Union Roofers), International Union of Operating Engineers (IUOE), International Brotherhood of Boilermakers, Iron Ship Builders, Blacksmiths, Forgers and Helpers (Boilermakers), International Association of Heat and Frost Insulators and Allied Workers (Insulators), International Association of Bridge, Structural, Ornamental and Reinforcing Iron Workers (IW) and The Canadian Building Trades Unions (CBTU)

NABTU has labor–management committees with workers in the biopharmaceutical industry, the oil and natural gas industries and the US chemical industry.

== Organization ==
The federation is organized in state, provincial and local councils. As of 2015, its funding consisted of an initiation fee, a per capita tax of 70 cents per member per month, an annual levy, agreements negotiated, sale of supplies and assessments.

As of 2012 Sean McGarvey has been President and Brent Brooker Secretary-Treasurer of the NABTU.

As of 2024 NABTU represents over 3 million skilled craft professionals in the United States and Canada.

=== Purpose ===
The NABTU was founded as a way to overcome the jurisdictional conflicts occurring in the building and construction trade unions. It was largely unsuccessful in this task; conflict ended only after the Taft–Hartley Act largely outlawed jurisdictional strikes.

The NABTU coordinates the activity of building and construction trade unions belonging to the AFL–CIO by establishing jurisdictional rules, coordinating how work is assigned at construction sites, mediating jurisdictional and work assignment disputes, and coordinating interaction between the AFL–CIO's construction unions and employers. It also coordinates the efforts of local unions in the building trades, including contract negotiations with employer organizations and apprenticeship and training programs.

The NABTU also conducts research into construction workplace health and safety issues. It lobbies the United States Congress and executive branch agencies (such as the Occupational Safety and Health Administration) on health, safety, wages (e.g., the Davis–Bacon Act of 1931), and other legislative and regulatory issues. The organization also helps its affiliate unions establish, coordinate and uphold minimum educational standards for apprenticeship and journeyman training programs.

The NABTU´s purpose is described in 13 sections as coordination, organization and formation of local councils, apprenticeship training, health and safety practices, dispute resolution and jurisdiction, engagement with industry, negotiations of wage and working conditions, legislative activity, research and public communications helping members to become elected officials.

=== Councils ===
The federation is organized through state, provincial, and local councils.

==== Affiliated Construction Trades of Ohio (ACT Ohio) ====
Affiliated Construction Trades of Ohio (ACT Ohio) is a nonprofit advocacy group that represents unionized construction workers across the state.

== Political positions ==
NABTU criticized President Obama's 2015 initiative of a tax-funded apprenticeship program, saying it was already doing its own.

In April 2016, NABTU and the presidents of eight building trade unions called on the AFL–CIO to cut its ties with environmentalist Tom Steyer, who founded NextGen America Climate Action, a super PAC to "prevent climate disaster and transition to clean energies", opposing fossil fuel pipelines.

In April 2017, NABTU President McGarvey applauded Donald Trump's plans for the Keystone Pipeline and other infrastructure projects, when Trump spoke at NABTU's 2017 legislative convention.

NABTU offered a $200,000 reward for information about the hanging of a rope noose at the Y-12 Uranium Processing Facility construction site in Oak Ridge, Tennessee. Nooses on construction sites had become common after the police murder of George Floyd in May 2020, with more than 20 nooses and other racist incidents on jobsites that year alone.

In April 2024, the NABTU endorsed Joe Biden for president of the United States. NABTU President McGarvey appeared in a video criticizing Donald Trump for failing to deliver on promises related to pensions and infrastructure projects and praising Joe Biden for "fixing our pension funds", "delivering" on promises with "monumental legislation" on infrastructure and "writing the rules so the rules work for working people".

== Leadership ==
=== Presidents ===
1908: James Kirby
1910: James A. Short
1913: John Donlin
1924: George F. Hendrick
1926: William J. McSorley
1930: Michael McDonough
1936: J. W. Williams
1937: Joseph McInerney
1939: John Coyne
1946: Richard J. Gray
1960: C. J. Haggerty
1971: Frank Bonadio
1974: Robert Georgine
2000: Ed Sullivan
2008: Mark Ayers
2012: Sean McGarvey

=== Secretary-Treasurers ===
1908: William J. Spencer
1924: William J. Tracy
1927: William J. Spencer
1934: Herbert Rivers
1951: Joseph D. Keenan
1954: Frank Bonadio
1971: Robert Georgine
1974: Joseph F. Maloney
1995: Paschal McGuinness
2000: Joseph Maloney
2005: Sean McGarvey
2012: Brent Booker
2022: Brandon Bishop

== See also ==
- List of construction trades
- Construction worker
- Civil engineering
- Index of construction articles
- Outline of construction

== Archives ==
- Building & Construction Trades Council (Seattle, Wash.) records. 1959-1974. 4 cubic ft. (4 boxes). At the Labor Archives of Washington, University of Washington Libraries Special Collections.
