= Ullico =

Financial services holding company in the United States

Ullico Inc.
- Formerly: Union Labor Life Insurance Company
- Type: Private
- Industry: Financial services
- Founded: May 1, 1927; 99 years ago
- Headquarters: Washington, D.C., United States
- Area served: United States
- Products: Insurance: life and health
- Website: ullico.com

Ullico Inc. is a privately held insurance and financial services holding company in the United States. Formerly known as Union Labor Life Insurance Company, it was founded in 1927 by the American Federation of Labor (AFL) and its then president, Samuel Gompers, to offer health and life insurance products specifically to working men and women. Matthew Woll, president of the International Photo-Engravers Union of North America, became the company's first president. Ullico is one of the largest insurance and investment services companies for trade union members in the United States.

== Overview ==
Ullico Inc.'s mission is to provide financial security to union members and their families. The company offers specialty insurance and investment products to labor organizations, union employers, municipalities and institutional investors, as well as union members and retirees. Ullico is a privately held, joint stock company. The company's constitution and bylaws permit shares to be held only by trade unions, union officials, union members and union benefit funds. The stock's value changes once a year when company directors set a new share price based on the advice of independent auditors.

As of 2009, the company insured more than two million union members and dependents through $25 billion in Life, Accidental Death and Dismemberment insurance. Further, more than six million members were served through $125 million in gross written Property and Casualty premiums. Ullico had $5.5 billion in assets and a consolidated GAAP Equity of nearly $240 million.

=== Divisions ===
Ullico Inc. consists of The Union Labor Life Insurance Company (Union Labor Life), Ullico Casualty Group Inc., Ullico Investment Advisers Inc. and Ullico Investment Company Inc. These companies fall into three divisions: Life and Health (Union Labor Life), Property and Casualty (Ullico Casualty Group) and Investment Services (Ullico Investment Advisers Inc. and Ullico Investment Company Inc.)

==== Life and health ====
More than 85 years ago, The Union Labor Life Insurance Company (Union Labor Life) became the founding unit of Ullico Inc. Today, Union Labor Life provides life and health solutions specifically tailored for the labor market. Through alliances with market leaders in risk protection, the company offers an array of insurance products for unions, jointly managed trust funds and organized employers as well as supplemental insurance programs that are directly marketed to union members, retirees and their families. Products including:

- Stop Loss Insurance: Protects self-funded, employer- or union-sponsored healthcare plans from incurring large or unforeseen catastrophic health expenses exceeding the plans predetermined dollar amounts. Union Labor Life helps each organization tailor their Stop Loss plans to each group's specific needs.
- Group Term Life and Accidental Death and Dismemberment Insurance: These offerings feature a unique Strike Waiver of Premium that allows premiums to be waived during sanctioned strikes when certain eligibility requirements are met.
- Voluntary Supplemental Insurance: Marketed directly to union members and retirees, options include Term and Whole Life, Accidental Death and Dismemberment, Accident and Hospital Indemnity Protection, Dental Insurance and Dental Discount programs.
- Union Labor Life also offers Group Vision Insurance, Group Prescription Benefit Management and Group Disability Insurance.

==== Property and casualty ====
Ullico Casualty Group creates insurance products that mitigate fiduciary risks to union workplaces and its trustees. Products include:

- Fiduciary Liability: As trustees and other fiduciaries of multi-employer and public benefit funds face significant personal liabilities, Ullico Casualty Group not only updates insurance coverage as these issues evolve, but knows how to resolve fiduciary claims to protect policyholders’ personal assets.
- Union Liability: Under federal labor law, officers and directors of labor unions can be exposed to personal liability, but must defend themselves, in certain circumstances, at their own expense. Union Liability covers the duty of fair representation, employment practices liability, financial management of the union and personal injury liability.
- Commercial Lines: The Property and Casualty portfolio includes Property, General Liability, Automobile, Umbrella and Workers’ Compensation coverage.
- Alternative Risk Solutions: The company's captive insurance programs, managed through Ullico Captive PCC and Ullico Risk Solutions LLC, help keep costs low by allowing policyholders with similar risk profiles to share in their own insurance risk.

==== Investment services ====
Ullico offers products and services designed for institutional investors through The Union Labor Life Insurance Company (Union Labor Life) and Ullico Investment Advisors Inc. (UIA). These products, including Ullico's real estate-related Separate Account J (also known as “J for Jobs”), are sold through the Ullico Investment Company (UIC).

Union Labor Life's Real Estate Investment Group (REIG) is responsible for originating, underwriting and managing the company's real estate mortgage and equity investments, while UIA, a registered investment advisor with the United States Securities and Exchange Commission (SEC), provides investment advice to institutional investors with a focus on jointly managed, multi-employer Taft-Hartley funds.

The UIC is a registered broker-dealer with the SEC and a member of the Financial Industry Regulatory Authority (FINRA) and the Securities Investor Protection Corporation (SIPC). The company markets and sells products managed through UIA and group annuity contracts offered through Union Labor Life.

Hearthstone Holdings, Inc., a portfolio company of Ullico's Infrastructure Fund that is headquartered in Morgantown, West Virginia, owns and operates natural gas distribution systems in Indiana, Ohio, North Carolina, Maine, Montana, and West Virginia. Hearthstone also owns and operates water and wastewater utilities in Arizona and Michigan.

== History ==
On May 1, 1927, in Washington, D.C., labor leaders formed the Union Labor Life Insurance Company (Union Labor Life), providing life insurance to union workers, which was unavailable at the time. Many Americans worked in hazardous jobs with few, if any, work safety laws in place to protect them. Railroads, construction sites and factories all presented too much risk for many companies’ underwriters. Life insurance was either priced out of reach of workers or insurance companies denied coverage because of the risks associated with their jobs. Union Labor Life aimed to provide a new level of stability for workers and increase their standard of living.

Samuel Gompers, the first president of the American Federation of Labor (AFL), saw the value in a union-owned insurance company. Matthew Woll, then president of the Photo Engravers Union, became Union Labor Life's first president. Soon more than 60 international unions, hundreds of local unions, and more than 300 individuals, including AFL president William Green, owned stock.

Over the years, as the needs of unions and their members evolved, Union Labor Life grew and diversified, offering health insurance, fiduciary liability insurance, investment products for pension funds and services for administering trust fund business. As other subsidiaries formed, it was clear that Union Labor Life needed another entity for future growth and diversification. In 1987, Ullico Inc. was created as a holding company for Union Labor Life and Ullico Casualty Company.

=== Timeline ===
1925: The AFL approves the creation of a union-owned insurance company.

1927: Union Labor Life opens for business on May 1, 1927, in Washington, D.C. Its first group policy was written for the Federal Employees Local 105 of Washington, D.C.

1932: Union Labor Life begins offering retirement annuities and issues its first stockholder and policyholder dividends.

1935: Company headquarters move to New York, New York.

1943: The organization begins offering group Accident, Health and Hospitalization insurance.

1946: Union Labor Life establishes company-paid-for insurance and pension plans for its own employees.

1957: The company purchases and merges with the American Standard Life Insurance Company, founded by the International Brotherhood of Electrical Workers in 1924.

1959: Group Dental and Prescription benefits are first offered.

1961: Group annuity actuarial and administration departments are created.

1966: Group Vision, Extended Care and an extended plan of Long-Term Disability are offered.

1977: Mortgage Separate Account J (J for Jobs) is introduced.

1979: Ullico Casualty Company is created to proceed with new kinds of insurance.

1983: Ullico headquarters move back to Washington, D.C.

1986: Ullico Casualty begins to market Fiduciary Liability insurance to funds and trustees as other carriers abandon the market.

1987: Ullico Inc. is established as a holding company for the company's subsidiaries and assets. A number of new ventures quickly follow.

1990: Trust Fund Advisors, a pension fund portfolio management company, is created.

1999: UlliCare®, a managed care health plan, is introduced. Ullico also buys Tri-City Brokerage, the largest and only independent national insurance wholesaler.

2006: Ullico becomes a registered broker and dealer with the National Association of Securities Dealers (NASD) and the SEC.

2008: Ullico Captive, PCC is established to offer alternative risk solutions through the Life and Health and Property and Casualty lines of business.

2009: Ullico Casualty Company posts a record $102 million in gross written in force premiums.

2010: In December 2010, the Ullico Board appoints Edward M. Smith as the company's new chief executive officer.

2020: Ullico Benefit Solutions, LLC has signed a strategic deal with Marathon Health, LLC.

== Scandals ==
Ullico expanded significantly in the 1990s, creating a large number of strategic alliances with other insurance companies and making a number of acquisitions. Beginning in the late 1990s, the organization experienced a range of problems and challenges, including a conflict of interest in pension fund management and insider trading.

=== AFL-CIO support for single-payer health care ===
Ullico's first conflict of interest occurred in 1991. In May of that year, the health care committee of the AFL-CIO executive council voted to reject a proposal to support a national single-payer health care plan. The stated reason was that the proposal had no chance of being enacted by Congress. But outside observers argued that the real reason was that government-supplied universal health care would have put union-run health insurance plans out of business. The deciding vote in the health committee was cast by Robert Georgine, chairman, president and chief executive officer of Ullico.

=== Conflict of interest in pension fund management ===
Ullico was caught up in a second conflict of interest scandal in 2002. In June 1998, the New York City local of the United Brotherhood of Carpenters and Joiners of America hired Zenith Administrators, a former Ullico subsidiary, to oversee the union's $1.7 billion pension and benefit funds. In 2002, federal prosecutors and the United States Department of Labor investigated the company for allegedly obtaining the contract through the influence of international union president Douglas J. McCarron—who was a director of Ullico. The Labor Department ended up suing Ullico and Zenith Administrators for mismanaging the union's funds.

=== Insider dealing scandal ===
A larger and more significant scandal also occurred in 2002, in which Ullico officers and directors were accused of engaging in insider dealing, stock price manipulation and other offenses.

==== Structure of the insider deal ====
In 1997, Gary Winnick, founder of telecommunications company Global Crossing, gave ULLICO officers and directors the chance to buy shares of his new company at substantially lower prices than offered to the public. All but two of Ullico's directors purchased 33 million shares for $7.6 million (or about 23 cents a share), with Ullico buying additional stock. Global Crossing went public, and the stock soared to $62 a share in 1999. This netted Ullico about $1.1 billion in profit.

For a variety of reasons, Global Crossing's stock price then began to decline sharply.

In December 1999, Georgine offered Ullico's officers and directors a chance to participate in its Global Crossing profits. Under Ullico's bylaws, Ullico officers and board members had the right to buy and sell Ullico stock. Georgine sent a confidential letter to board members inviting them to sell their Global Crossing shares and use the proceeds to purchase up to 4,000 Ullico shares at the then-current price of $53.94. The increase in Global Crossing share price had not yet been recorded by Ullico's auditors, PricewaterhouseCoopers. Unlike publicly traded companies, Ullico only set its stock price once a year, based on its prior year book value. When it was, the auditors were sure to recommend a significantly higher Ullico share price. Under the bylaws, the board members could then authorize a share repurchase plan. Board members would be able to redeem their Ullico shares at the higher price. When the Ullico shares were re-priced later to reflect the now-worthless Global Crossing shares, the company's stock price would return to near its previous level. It was a chance to sell their tumbling Ullico shares.

All Ullico shareholders, including union pension plans, could sell a prorated amount based on their total holding. Yet those with fewer than 10,000 shares—mostly the directors—could sell all their stock. Ullico did not offer the deal to others. rank and file union members, who owned the bulk of Ullico stock through professionally managed union pension plans, were not told of the stock offering and would not be permitted to buy stock at the $53.94 price (had they known about the stock offering).

A majority of the Ullico board approved the plan. Many board members duly sold their tumbling Global Crossing shares and bought Ullico stock at the price of $53.94 a share. In May 2000, acting on the auditor's recommendation, the Ullico board of directors approved a share price of $146. On November 2, 2000, Ullico's board approved a plan to repurchase $30 million worth of Ullico stock at $146 a share. Board members were permitted to sell all of their shares, making nearly $13.7 million in profits, while the unions and their pension plans were allowed to sell only a fraction of their shares. In May 2001, the Ullico board, acting on the recommendation of its auditor, set the company's share price at $74 (a new, lower price established almost exclusively by the drop in Global Crossing shares).

Meanwhile, Ullico began losing money. The company lost $22 million in 2001, and $74 million in 2002. Ullico's combined capital and surplus—a key measure of an insurance company's financial health—fell from $51.8 million in 2001 to $17.95 million in 2002. PricewaterhouseCoopers expressed doubt about Ullico's financial solvency. Ullico then issued more stock, raising $50 million from its shareholders, and agreed to sell its newly completed downtown office building near the White House to raise another $160 million.

==== Scandal exposed ====
Beginning March 15, 2002, the Wall Street Journal published a series of articles about Ullico's insider stock deal. Global Crossing had filed for bankruptcy in January 2002, and a number of investors suffered significant financial setbacks. Ullico's investment in Global Crossing was well known, and the newspaper's reporters wondered how severely union members' investments had suffered from the bankruptcy. The paper also discovered that a federal grand jury was already investigating the stock transactions.

On April 29, 2002, Ullico's board of directors agreed to conduct an investigation into the legality and ethics of the stock sales. The board meeting which preceded the vote was a contentious one, and the all-day meeting ended very late in the afternoon. But in the end, the board unanimously voted to ask James R. Thompson, former Republican governor of Illinois and chairman and CEO of Winston & Strawn LLP (a large and prestigious D.C. law firm), to review the sales.

Thompson's report was completed in November 2002, but its release was hotly debated. Thompson and two investigators, Robert W. Tarun and Stephen J. Senderowitz (both former prosecutors with the United States Department of Justice and both now attorneys at Winston & Strawn), issued a 100-page report just before Thanksgiving. The report harshly criticized Georgine and the secretive, manipulative nature of the stock trades. The report also concluded that the officers and directors had breached their fiduciary duties and probably violated some states' securities laws. The report noted that the board's compensation committee had approved the repurchase plan even though its members were prohibited from making decisions relating to their own compensation. Although the report said no Ullico directors or officers had violated criminal laws, it did strongly recommend that all board members return any profits to the company. Finally, the report found that Ullico officers may also have made millions of dollars in profits in special purchases and other bonuses, which may not have been properly approved.

==== Debate over Thompson report ====
A fight broke out over whether to make the report public. Thompson made the report available to Ullico's board of directors, and required board members to sign statements promising to keep the findings confidential. Without a board vote to release the report, it would have remained secret. A number of board members did not want their role in the stock scandal made public. Board member John J. Sweeney, then president of the AFL-CIO and one of the board members who did not participate in the stock trading scheme, demanded the release of the report. Georgine and Sweeney engaged in numerous heated arguments for several weeks, debating whether to release the Thompson report. Finally, on December 1, 2002, Sweeney resigned from the Ullico board in protest. Four other members of the board followed suit over the next month.

The fate of the Thompson report led to a number of lawsuits. The Maryland Insurance Administration subpoenaed the report, forcing Ullico to challenge the subpoena in court. The United Auto Workers also filed suit to force Ullico to release the report. Even the U.S. Department of Labor filed suit to force the report into public.

In late February 2003, Sweeney threatened to debate the Ullico stock sale in an open meeting of the AFL-CIO executive council in May.

Sweeney's threat, worsening public opinion and continued media scrutiny of the affair led the Ullico board to make the report public. On March 25, 2003, the Ullico board of directors created a special advisory committee to debate the report's release. The advisory committee voted unanimously to accept the report and release it to the public, but voted against acceptance of the report's demand that board members surrender their profits.

At a Ullico board meeting on March 28, Georgine proposed returning his profits to the company. But other board members argued this would pressure them to return their profits, too—something they did not wish to do. The scandal was causing a split in the AFL-CIO's member unions. Sweeney and some unions argued that surrendering profits was the only way to restore confidence in the labor movement. But other unions, led by Martin Maddaloni, president of the United Association of Journeymen and Apprentices of the Plumbing and Pipefitting Industry (the plumbers' union), said they did nothing that directors in other companies had not also done. Meanwhile, an aggravated Thompson issued a public statement accusing Ullico and its legal counsel of making defamatory statements about him and his inquiry and misrepresenting the report's findings.

==== New board and new investigation ====
Three weeks later, at Ullico's annual meeting, Georgine was forced out and a new board of directors installed. In a hastily organized board meeting late on April 23, 2003, Sweeney, board member Terence M. O'Sullivan Jr. (president of the Laborers' International Union of North America) and Edwin D. Hill (president of the International Brotherhood of Electrical Workers) nominated a reform slate of 13 new board members. Georgine withdrew his name as a candidate for the board. O'Sullivan and Maddaloni (who agreed in mid-April to return his $418,880 profits) were the lone incumbents to return to the board.

Georgine attempted to stay on as president and CEO of Ullico, but resigned on May 8 after the new board indicated it would attempt to fire him. Georgine subsequently claimed Ullico owed him $2 million in severance pay, a claim Ullico disputed. O'Sullivan was elected Ullico's new chairman, replacing Georgine.

A deeper investigation by the new board found additional problems. Georgine's profits from the stock trade were found to be far higher than anyone had guessed—nearly $8.8 million. Georgine and other Ullico executives also received millions of dollars in special bonuses and deferred compensation never approved by the board. O'Sullivan also disclosed that Ullico officers had loaned Georgine $2.2 million to purchase 40,000 shares of low-priced Ullico stock prior to the stock trading scheme, further enlarging his profits, and that Georgine's salary had risen from $900,000 in 1996 to $5.4 million in 2000. Ullico's compensation committee lacked the authority to approve both the loan and the salary increases but did so anyway. O'Sullivan then issued letters to Georgine and the other officers demanding that they refund this money.

These revelations led to an investigation by the United States Congress. The United States House Committee on Education and Labor subpoenaed Georgine to testify about the Ullico stock trading scheme, but Georgine asserted his Fifth Amendment right against self-incrimination and refused to testify.

==== Regaining financial stability ====
In 2001 and 2001, the company issued more stock and sold its newly completed Washington, D.C. office building to raise funds. By Spring 2003, with Terence M. O'Sullivan as the chairman of the new board of directors, Ullico began rectifying its finances.

By year-end 2010, under new day-to-day management and a revamped Board of Directors, the company has returned to its solid financial footing with $6 billion of assets under management.

On May 11, 2013, the financial woes of Ullico Casualty Company (a Ullico subsidiary) led to a court order declaring the entity insolvent. The other Ullico subsidiaries and the Ullico holding company are not directly impacted by that order.

On May 24, 2017, the Florida Third District Court of Appeal reversed a final summary judgment entered in favor of Ullico, concluding that a real estate broker had an ownership interest in purchase money deposits held in an escrow trust account.
