= Il Nuovo Mondo =

Italian language newspaper in the United States (1925–1931)

- Publisher: Avanti News Company
- Founded: 16 November 1925
- Ceased publication: 29 November 1931
- Political alignment: Anti-Fascism; Socialism
- Language: Italian
- Headquarters: New York; Chicago
- Country: United States

Il Nuovo Mondo was an Italian language anti-Fascist daily newspaper which was published in New York City and then, in Chicago between 1926 and 1931. The paper was the first anti-Fascist daily published abroad by the Italians.

== History and profile ==
Il Nuovo Mondo was started in New York City in 1925, and the first issue appeared on 16 November. Frank Bellanca was the founder and also, served as its director. The members of the Anti-Fascist Alliance of North America, a socialist-syndicalist group, were also instrumental in the establishment of the paper. The financier of the paper was Local 89 which was a unit of the International Ladies Garment Workers Union. The general secretary of the Local 89 was an Italian, Luigi Antonini. The paper was published by Avanti News Company daily except for Mondays.

Il Nuovo Mondo mostly featured the articles written by the Italian exiles who left Italy due to the oppression of the Fascist rule in Italy. The paper also covered writings of the American critics of Fascism. It published the manifesto of the North American Anti-Fascist Alliance on 26 August 1926.

Il Nuovo Mondo was initially a labor organ, but it was sold to the Italian socialist exiles in April 1929. From 2 October 1929 to 8 February 1930 the paper was published in Chicago. The final issue of Il Nuovo Mondo was 282 which was published on 29 November 1931.
