= Salvatore Ninfo =

20th-century labor leader

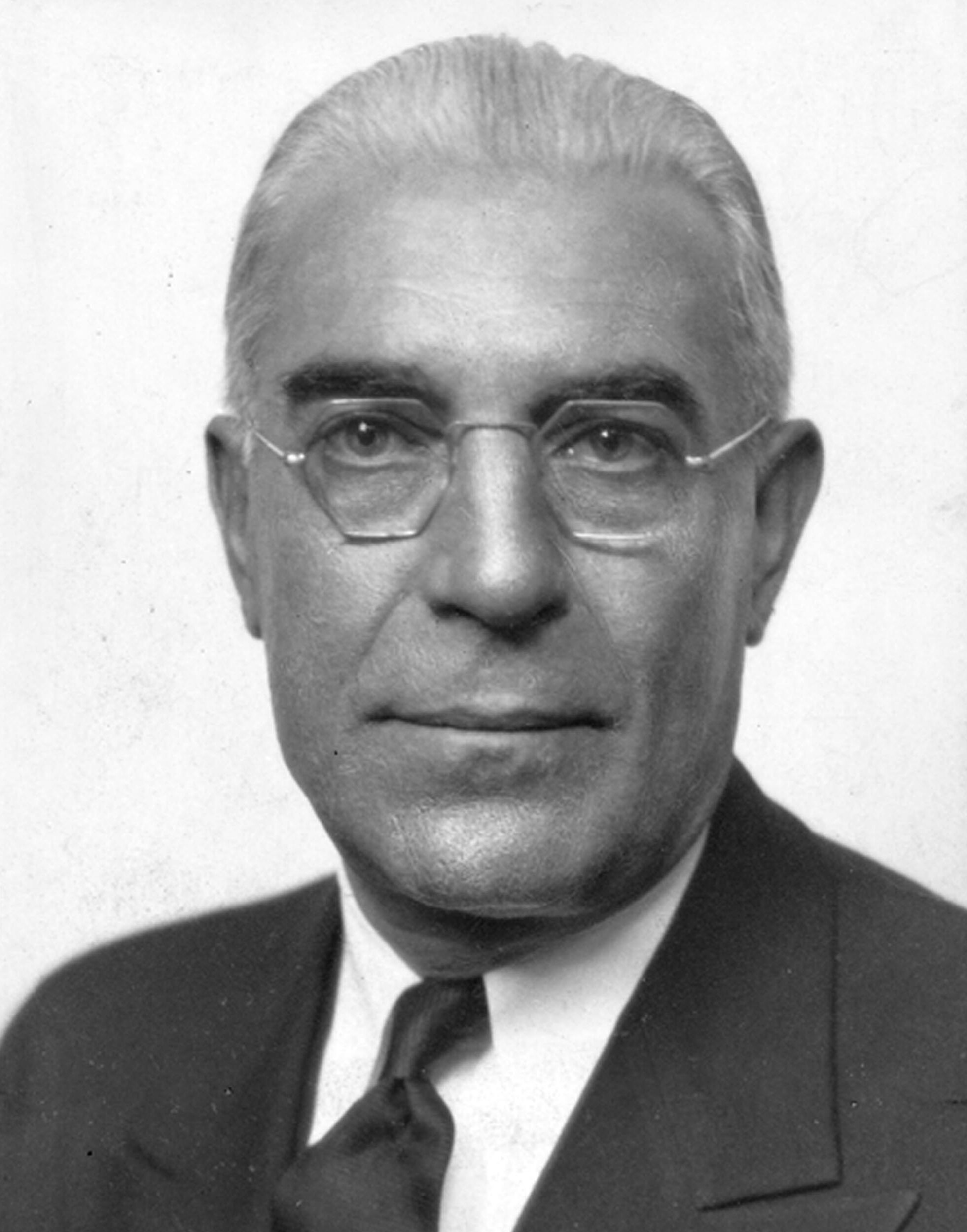
- Ninfo c. 1938

Acting President of the International Ladies Garment Workers Union
- In office January 1923 – February 1923
- Preceded by: Benjamin Schlesinger
- Succeeded by: Morris Sigman

First Vice President of the International Ladies Garment Workers Union
- In office May 19, 1922 – June 9, 1934
- President: Morris Sigman; Benjamin Schlesinger; David Dubinsky
- Preceded by: Morris Sigman
- Succeeded by: Luigi Antonini

Vice President of the International Ladies Garment Workers Union
- In office 1916–1923
- Preceded by: Multi-member position
- Succeeded by: Multi-member position

Member of the New York City Council from The Bronx At-Large
- In office January 1, 1938 – December 31, 1943
- Preceded by: Constituency established
- Succeeded by: Multi-member district

Personal details
- Born: May 13, 1883 Sicily, Kingdom of Italy
- Died: January 1, 1960 (aged 76) New York City, New York, U.S.
- Party: Socialist (before 1936); American Labor (after 1936)
- Occupation: Labor leader

Salvatore Ninfo (May 13, 1883 – January 1, 1960) was a union organizer and officer for the International Ladies' Garment Workers' Union (ILGWU).

== Biography ==
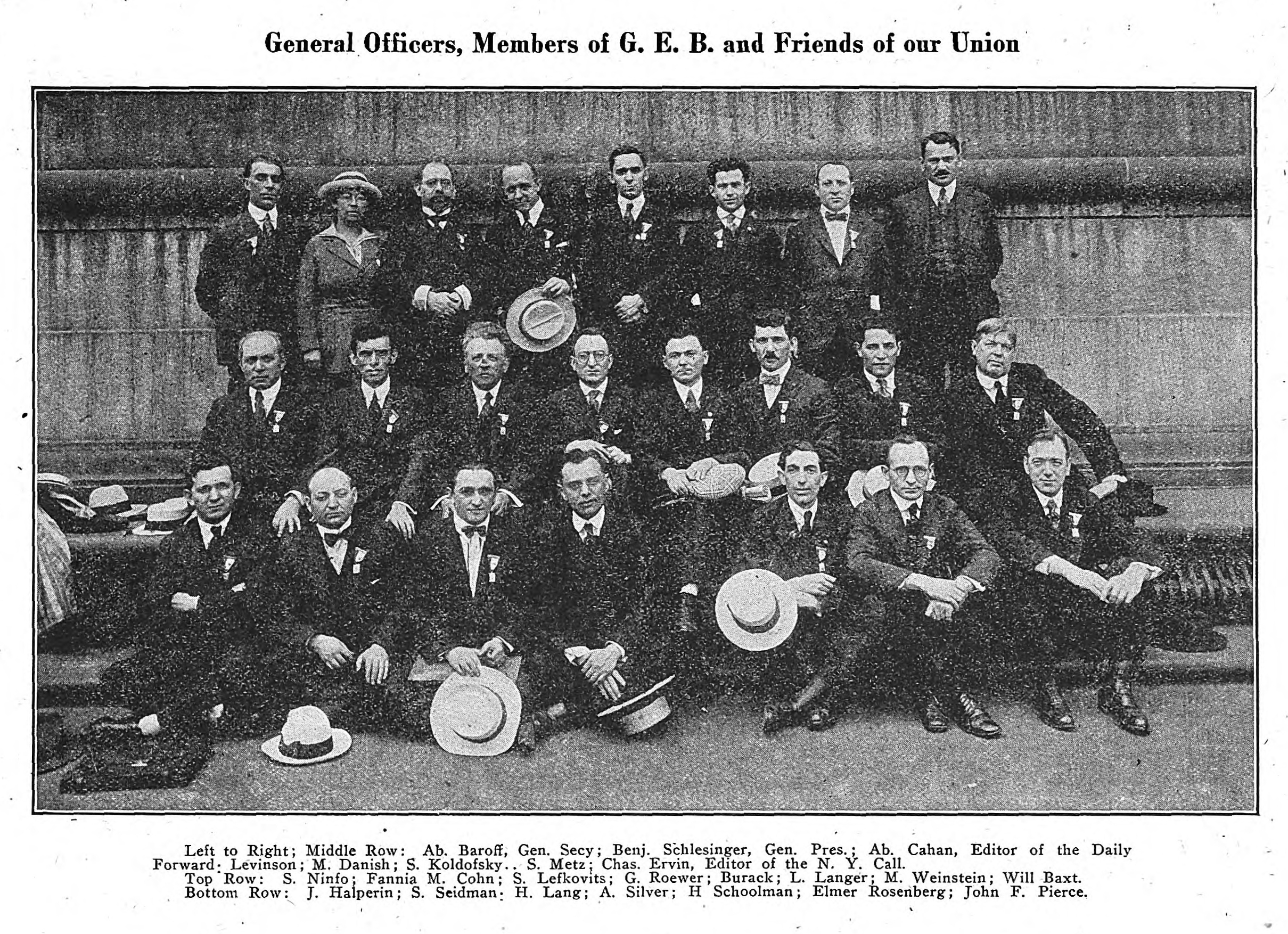
General Officers, Members of the General Executive Board, and Friends of the International Ladies Garment Workers Union, June 1918. Ninfo stands in the back row, far left.

Born in Sicily, Ninfo immigrated to the United States in 1899. For the next decade, Ninfo worked to organize Italian workers and lead in the garment industry's major early strikes. Except for a period (1903-1906) when he worked to organize Italian craft workers in New York, Philadelphia, and Boston for the American Federation of Labor (AFL), Ninfo worked with the ILGWU.

In 1902, Ninfo joined Local 9, the New York Cloak Finishers' and Tailors' Union. In 1906, when he returned from organizing for the AFL, he served as a member of the executive board of Local 9, and in 1908, he was both a delegate to the Cloak Joint Board and a general organizer for the ILGWU. Ninfo was deeply involved in the dressmakers' strike (1909) and the cloakmakers' strike (1910), also known as the "Uprising of the 20,000" and "The Great Revolt," and after the Protocol of Peace, he served as a business agent for the New York Cloak Joint Board and manager of Local 48.

Ninfo was elected vice president (1916) and then for a brief period of about four months, between Benjamin Schlesinger's resignation and Morris Sigman's election, he served as Acting President of the ILGWU (1923). After Sigman's election, Ninfo became first vice president (1923-1934) and later (1936), manager of Local 145 in Passaic, New Jersey.

Ninfo ran for Congress on the Socialist ticket in 1922, polling 14% of the vote against the Democrat Frank A. Oliver.

Ninfo left the ILGWU when he was elected to the New York City Council on the American Labor Party ticket in 1937. He served on the city council until 1943.

In 1939, just days after the outbreak of World War II, Ninfo's 29-year-old son Ralph was convicted of "inciting to a breach of the peace" by making sidewalk speeches calling for all American Jews to be killed. The elder Ninfo said he hoped his son would be "put in jail for the rest of his life," adding that he had washed his hands of his son. Ralph Ninfo said he had joined the Coughlinite Christian Citizens Committee.

== Sources ==
- Biography of Salvatore Ninfo
