= Benjamin Schlesinger =

Lithuanian-born American trade union official and newspaper office manager

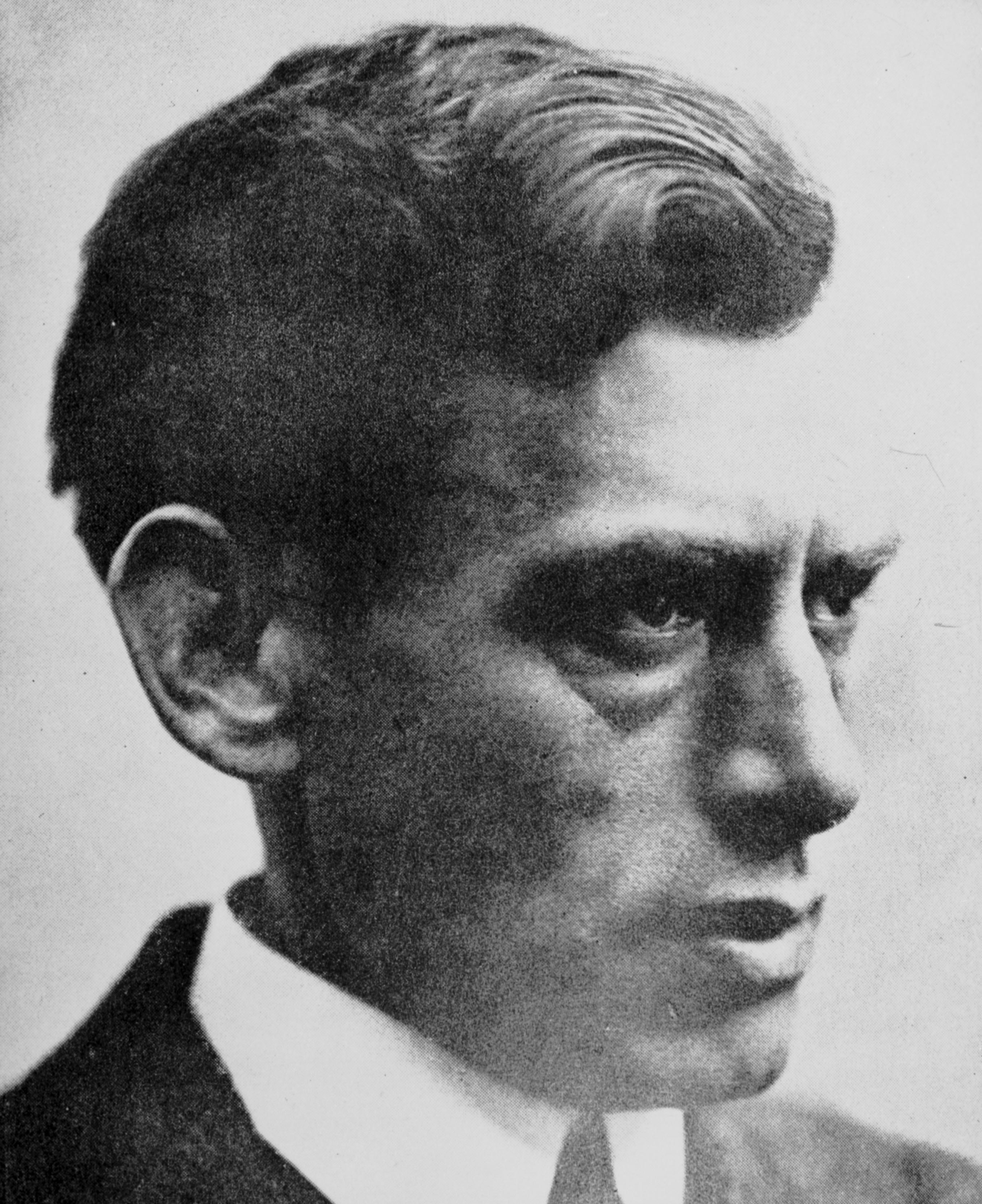
Schlesinger c. 1925

Benjamin "Ben" Schlesinger (December 25, 1876 – June 6, 1932) was a Lithuanian-born American trade union official and newspaper office manager. Schlesinger is best remembered as the nine-time president of the International Ladies Garment Workers Union (ILGWU), serving from 1903 to 1907, again from 1914 to 1923, and finally from 1928 until his death in 1932. He was also the managing editor of The Jewish Daily Forward from 1907 to 1912 and the resident manager of the Chicago edition of that publication beginning in 1923.

== Biography ==
=== Early years ===
Benjamin Schlesinger was born December 25, 1876, in Kaidan, Lithuania, which was then part of the Russian Empire. He was the son of Nechemiah Ariowitz and Judith Schlesinger, and attended the local Cheder. His grandfather, Simcha, was Rabbi in Racinn, Lithuania. His father died when he was four and his mother some years later in 1909.

He emigrated with an older brother to this country in 1891, settling in Chicago. Schlesinger's first job after his arrival in Chicago was peddling matches but, a few weeks later, he was employed as a "floor boy" in a cloak shop. Two years later, when he was 17, and a sewing machine operator on ladies cloaks and suits, he led his first strike, a successful one, in his shop.

He was a delegate from Chicago to the convention which founded the International Cloak Makers Union of America on May 1, 1892. Schlesinger, then only 16 years old, was elected treasurer. In 1895 he was elected recording secretary of the Chicago Cloak Makers Union, a post he held for at least three years. He became business manager and organizer of Local 5 of the Chicago Cloakmakers' Union in 1902 and, when the five Chicago locals united under a Joint Executive Board, he became manager of that organization.

=== Political activity ===
Schlesinger joined the Socialist Labor Party of America in 1895, remaining in that organization until the party split of 1899. Schlesinger later joined the Socialist Party of America, of which he remained a member until the time of his death.

Schlesinger was also an active member of the Workmen's Circle, a Jewish mutual aid and social benefit society.

=== Trade union career ===
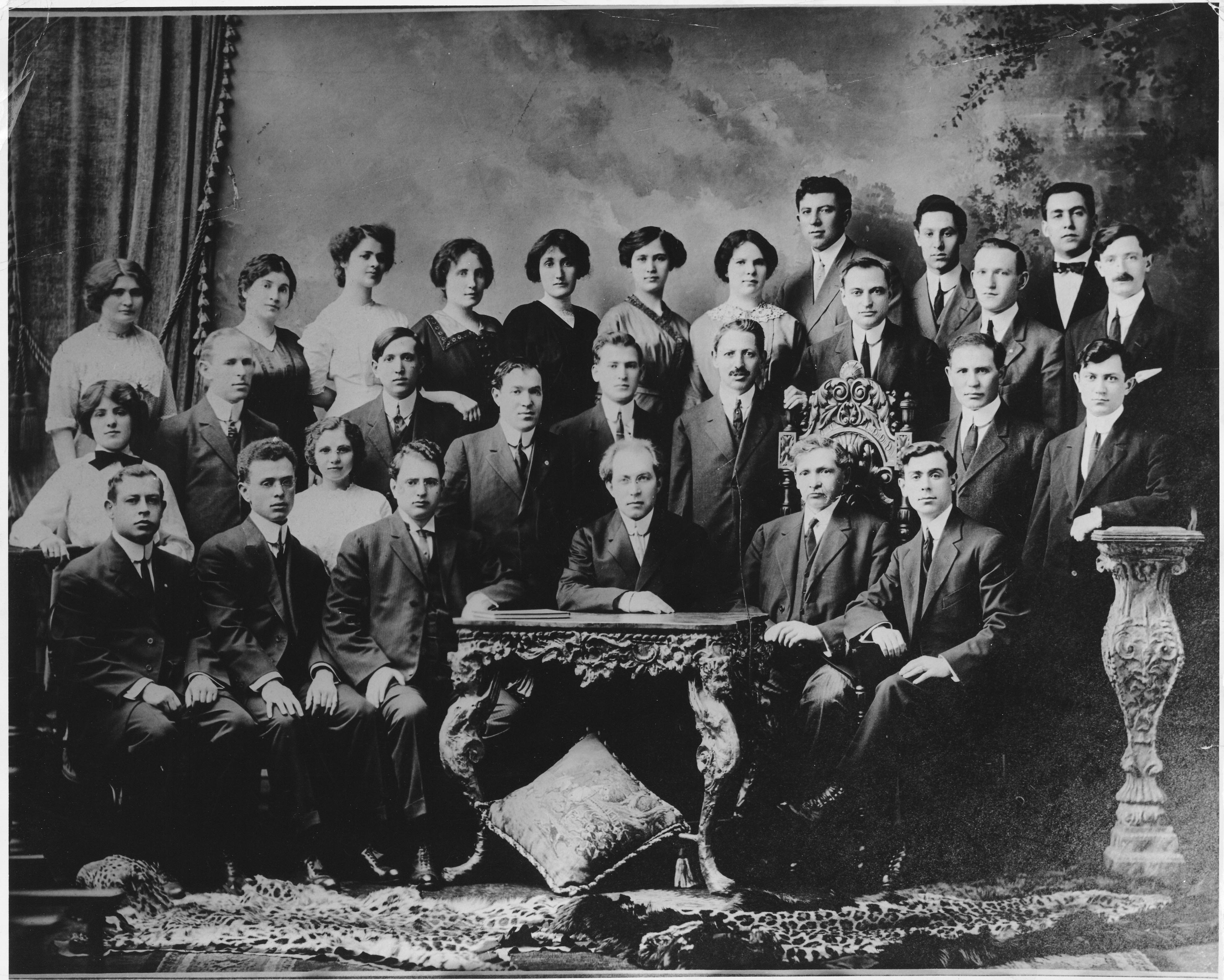
ILGWU Local 25 Executive Board in 1910. Schlesinger is seated in the front row, second from left.

Schlesinger's first position as a trade union functionary came when he was elected business manager of the Chicago Cloakmakers' Union in 1902, aged just 17.

In May 1903, Schlesinger was elected president of the ILGWU and, after only a brief term, became organizer for the New York locals in January 1904, in which post he stayed until 1907.

From 1909 to 1912, Schlesinger served as business manager of the Yiddish language Jewish Daily Forward. While still in that position, he served as a member of the Strike Committee in the 1910 strike.

In June 1914, Schlesinger was once more elected president of the ILGWU and served until January 1923. During this period, other offices he held included the following: manager of the New York Joint Board, "without pay, temporarily," (1914); president, Needle Trades Workers Alliance (1920); member, general executive board, International Clothing Workers' Federation, Amsterdam (1919–23); delegate, American Federation of Labor, to British Trades Union Congress (1922); and member, People's Relief Committee (1917–22). Schlesinger served (1923–28) as manager of the Chicago office of the Jewish Daily Forward and was elected, for the last time, as president of the ILGWU in October 1928, serving until his death in June 1932. Benjamin Schlesinger was, at various times, a member of the Workmen's Circle, Forward Association, Socialist Labor Party and Socialist Party.

Among the proposals which Benjamin Schlesinger initiated and which were then or later adopted as policy by the Union, were the following: he introduced at the convention of 1902 a resolution urging locals to arrange bimonthly or at least monthly lectures and discussions on all educational subjects.

At the 1903 convention, he introduced a resolution urging locals to establish sick-benefit funds. In 1914, he proposed special training of active workers for the Union and the International entered into an arrangement with the Rand School of Social Science for a course of studies for members of the New York locals. The program lasted for one year. The following year, June 28, 1915, in the midst of demonstrations and strike demands on the question of "hiring and firing," Schlesinger asked the Protective Association to submit the dispute to a committee of unbiased persons. As a result, a Council of Conciliation was appointed by Mayor Mitchel and the strike was avoided. Another strike in Chicago that same summer was similarly avoided.

In 1918, he successfully proposed that business agents be considered "experts" and appointed by the elected officers. He was also successful, in the period 1920-21, in dividing Local 25 into two groups of waistmakers and dressmakers, to accommodate the growing dressmaking section of the industry, resulting in the establishment of the New York Dress Makers' Union, Local 22, then the largest local union in the International. On July 1, 1920, Schlesinger addressed a letter to the Neckwear Workers' Union of New York, the International Journeymen Tailors' Union of America, the International Fur Workers' Union, the United Garment Workers of America, the Amalgamated Clothing Workers of America, and the United Cloth Hat, Cap Makers and Millinery Workers' Union of America, proposing an alliance of all garment workers unions. Discussions dragged on for several years but with only limited success.

Schlesinger was the author of several pamphlets on the garment industry.

In 1923 Schlesinger returned to the Jewish Daily Forward, working as the resident manager of the Chicago edition of that publication.

=== Personal life ===
Schlesinger became an American citizen in that city on March 19, 1898. He was married to Rae Schenhause on August 27, 1899, in Chicago. At the time of his death he was survived by his widow, Ray, and three children, two boys and a girl.

=== Death and legacy ===
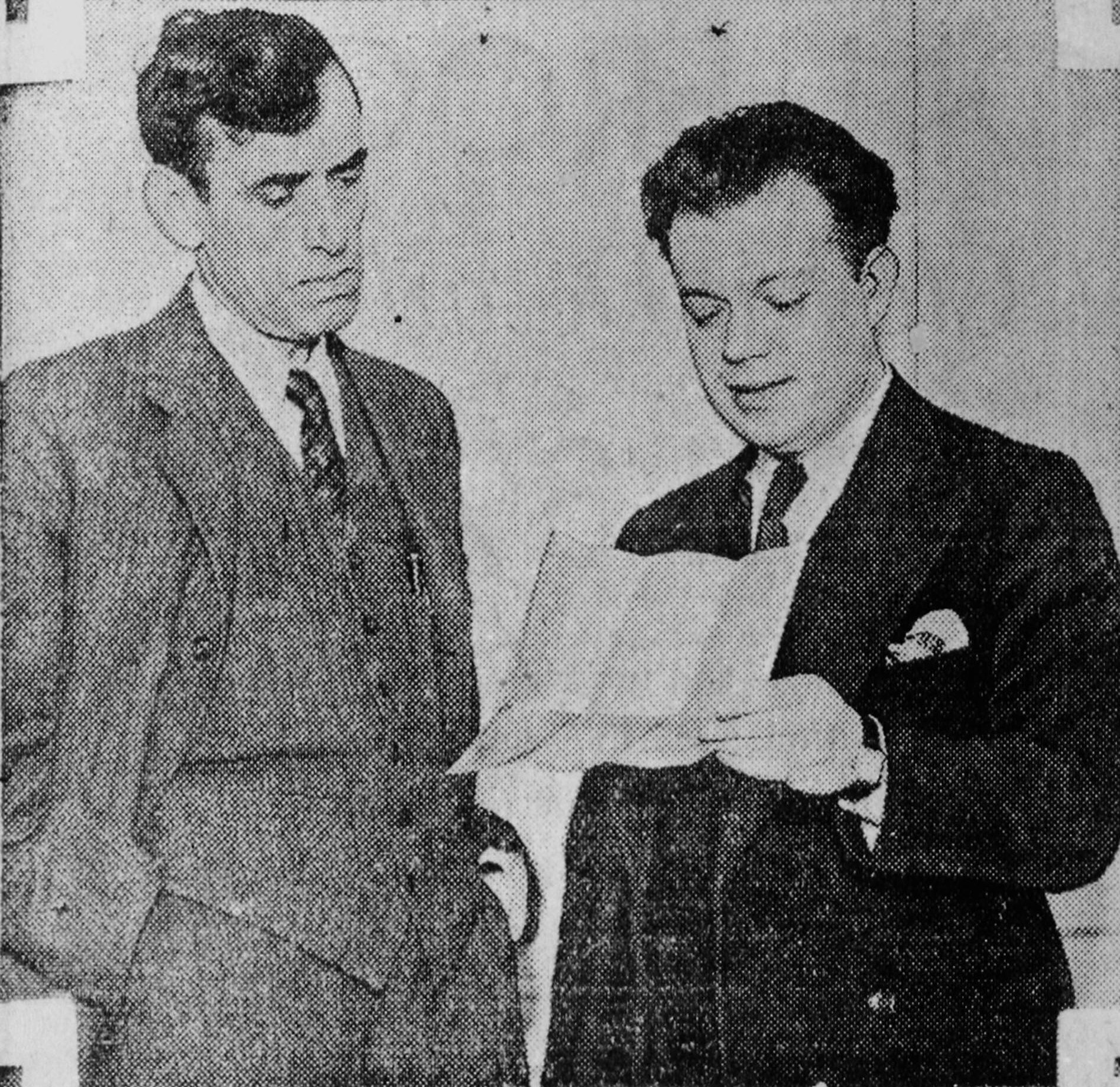
Schlesinger and David Dubinsky shortly before the former's death

Schlestinger died on June 6, 1932, in a sanitarium in Denver, Colorado, where he had been undergoing treatment for tuberculosis. His body was immediately taken east by his son. Great masses of workers turned out for memorial services held in Schlesinger's honor in Chicago and New York City, with more than 10,000 people surrounding ILGWU headquarters at 3 West 16th Street, the crowd flowing into nearby Fifth Avenue.

In 1967, the junior high school on New York Blvd., Jamaica, Queens, was named the Benjamin Schlesinger Junior High School in his honor.

In 1982, Benjamin Schlesinger Junior High School was renamed the Catherine and Count Basie Middle School 72.

== Footnotes ==
Trade union offices
| Preceded by Herman Grossman | President of the International Ladies' Garment Workers' Union; 1903–1904 | Succeeded by James McCauley |
| Preceded by Abraham Rosenberg | President of the International Ladies' Garment Workers' Union; 1914–1923 | Succeeded by Salvatore Ninfo |
| Preceded by Morris Sigman | President of the International Ladies' Garment Workers' Union; 1928–1932 | Succeeded by David Dubinsky |
| Preceded by James J. Forrester; William J. Spencer | American Federation of Labor delegate to the Trades Union Congress; 1922; With: Edward J. McGivern | Succeeded by Anthony Chlopek; Peter S. Shaughnessy |
