= Min Matheson =

American labor organizer (1909-1992)

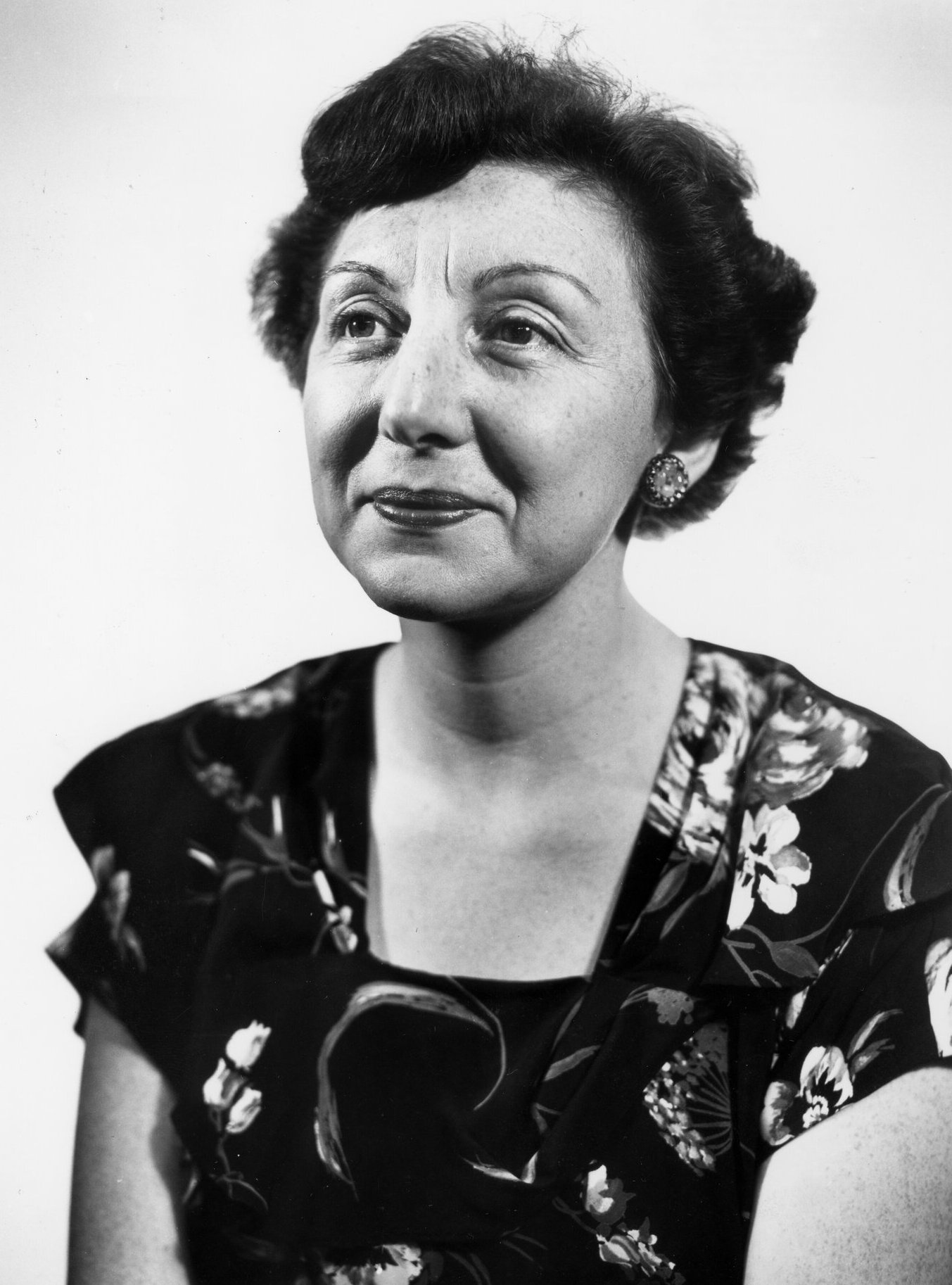
Min Matheson (1909-1992) portrait

Minnie Hindy "Min" Matheson (née Lurye; January 9, 1909 – December 8, 1992) was a labor organizer for the International Ladies’ Garment Workers Union (ILGWU) in northeastern Pennsylvania silk and textile mills who successfully stood up to organized crime. Min was also a founding member of the National Organization for Women.

== Early life ==
Born in Chicago on January 19th, 1909, Minnie Hindy Lurye's parents were Max and Anna (Kahn) Lurye, Jewish immigrants from Russia. She was one of eight children. Min's father was a cigar maker, and a prominent labor leader who often staged rallies and strikes in the cigar industry. Min saw much of the violence within the mafia controlled labor industries, and her father's career in organizing labor workers inspired her to do the same.

Min met her husband-to-be, Bill Matheson, when she was 19. The two moved east to join a textile workers’ strike in Paterson, N.J, settling in New York City and began careers with in the garment industry. Min worked within a dress factory, and became the head of a 32,000-member ILGWU local in New York in 1937. Min and her husband had two children, Marianne, born in 1941, and Betty, born in 1943.

== The ILGWU ==
The ILGWU was one of the largest labor unions within the United States and had branches in many states including Pennsylvania and New York. Women had significant involvement within the ILGWU. The organization branched from so-called run-away shops. These shops got their name because they deviated from the manufacturer-contractor system that was the norm in the 20th century. In this system, wholesalers received orders from retailers directly, and independently run sub-manufacturers filled the orders. Competition between sub-manufacturers allowed for the wholesalers to lower prices.

Min and her husband were both working for the ILGWU in 1944 when the two left for northeastern Pennsylvania. The two were ordered simply "to clean up the mess down there" amid strife among garment workers and a strong presence of organized crime. Runaway shops began to take hold of northeastern Pennsylvania due to the declining economic landscape of the area and due to the close proximity to New York.

Min faced opposition from organized crime bosses including Russell Alfred Bufalino. These crime bosses ensured prevention of union protests and the like which served to harm local businesses despite worker grievances. Crime bosses such as Bufalino often used garment factories as fronts for various illegal activities. Crime bosses also often bribed the police as an attempt to weaken the unions.

When Min came to Wilkes-Barre in 1944, there were only six organized businesses with a total of 650 union members. Upon her departure in 1963, Min left Wilkes-Barre with 168 organized factories and over 11,000 ILGWU members.

The ILGWU contributed to workers’ personal lives in addition to their work lives. Education opportunities were presented in the form of scholarships and classes offered at Wilke’s College. Health benefits such as a health center, maternity benefits, and death benefits were also offered to members of the ILGWU with Min’s help.

== Later career ==
Min was one of the founding members of the National Organization for Women, or NOW. The group’s main goal is equal rights for women by bringing women into mainstream American society. Upon retirement, Min and her husband returned to northeastern Pennsylvania in 1972, only one year before a catastrophic flood of the Susquehanna River devastated the area. Once the flood hit, Min, despite being retired, played a key role in organizing the Flood Victims Action Council and pressuring George Romney, the U.S. Secretary of Housing and Urban Development. Min's efforts resulted in relief efforts supported by the Federal government to aid reconstruction of Wyoming Valley.

== Death ==
Min died on December 8, 1992, at age 83 in the Wilkes-Barre General Hospital. Min now has a historical marker dedicated in her name for her accomplishments in Wilkes-Barre with the ILGWU. The marker was dedicated on September 24, 1999, and it is located in Wilkes-Barre’s Public Square.
