= Luigi Antonini =

Italian-American trade union leader and anti-fascist organizer (1883–1968)

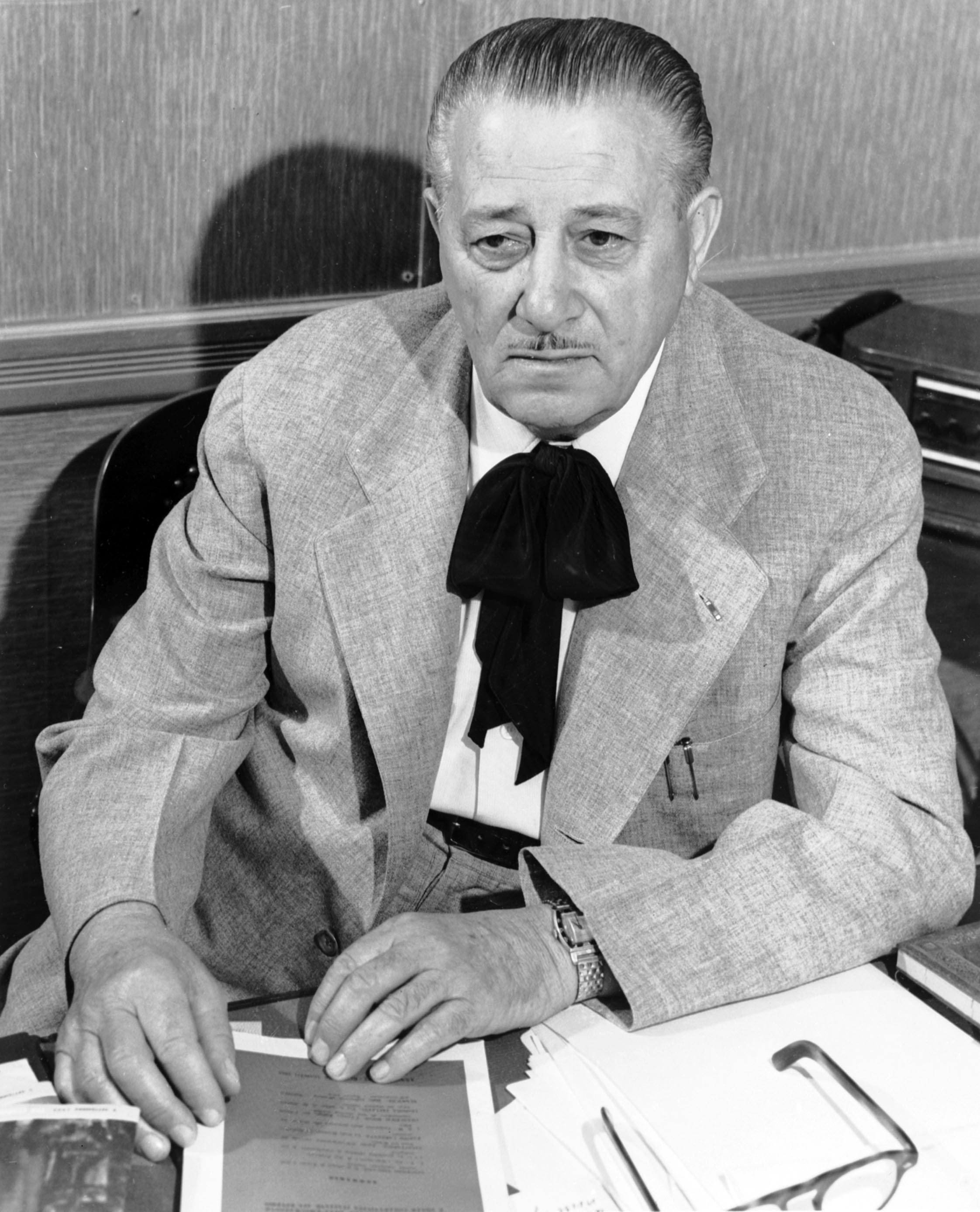
- Antonini in 1934

New York State Chairman of the American Labor Party
- In office July 16, 1936 – August 21, 1942
- Preceded by: Position established
- Succeeded by: George Counts

First Vice President of the International Ladies Garment Workers Union
- In office June 9, 1934 – May 30, 1968
- President: David Dubinsky; Louis Stulberg
- Preceded by: Salvatore Ninfo
- Succeeded by: Howard Molisani

Personal details
- Born: September 11, 1883 Vallata, Italy
- Died: December 30, 1968 (aged 85) New York City, New York, United States
- Party: American Labor; Liberal
- Occupation: Labor leader

Luigi Antonini (September 11, 1883 – December 30, 1968) was an Italian-American trade union leader and anti-fascist organizer. He was the first Vice President of the International Ladies Garment Workers Union, and organizer of the Italian-American Labor Council (IALC). He was one of the first to organize the Italian-American anti-fascist movement. Antonini joined the Anti-Fascist Alliance of North America in 1923. The group revolved around a newspaper published in New York, Il Nuovo Mondo.

== Life in Italy ==
Luigi Antonini was born in Vallata in the province of Avellino in 1883. His father Pietro Valerio Antonini (born in Gaggiano, Milan in 1848) was a Milanese teacher who had come to teach in the local school; in Milan he had studied at the conservatory with Giuseppe Verdi and had played the organ in its cathedral. The Antonini family had solid liberal and Risorgimento traditions, counting among its members the general Giacomo Antonini who had fought with Napoleon and then with the Savoy. His mother Maria Francesca Netta (born in Vallata in 1853) belonged to the local minor nobility.

Upon the premature death of his wife in 1892, Pietro Valerio returned with his seven children to Northern Italy. Luigi attended schools in Tortona in Piedmont and between 1902 and 1906 served as an infantryman in the Italian Army.

== Life in the United States ==
In 1908 Luigi Antonini and his brother Paolo moved to New York. Like many Italians, Luigi began his American life by adapting to various job offers. He worked in a tobacco factory, then in a piano company, and finally in a shirt factory in Manhattan. Contact with hard daily work soon transformed Luigi into an active defender of workers' rights, at a time when trade unions, already established in Europe, were still in their infancy in the United States.

Luigi Antonini first linked his name to the union during the 1913 textile workers' strike as a member of the International Ladies Garment Workers Union (ILGWU), a trade union organization founded in 1900 in New York. His oratory and passion quickly transformed him into the champion of Italian workers and an authoritative representative of the textile union. Thanks to his activism, the following year in 1914 he was elected to the executive board of the ILGWU.

Antonini soon understood the importance that the press could have in the union struggle. In 1916 he became the editor of the Italian-language periodical L'Operaia, which promoted the unionization of Italian women workers, significantly increasing their membership in the ILGWU. He also founded the Italian edition of the ILGWU's periodical, Giustizia.

=== Interwar Period ===
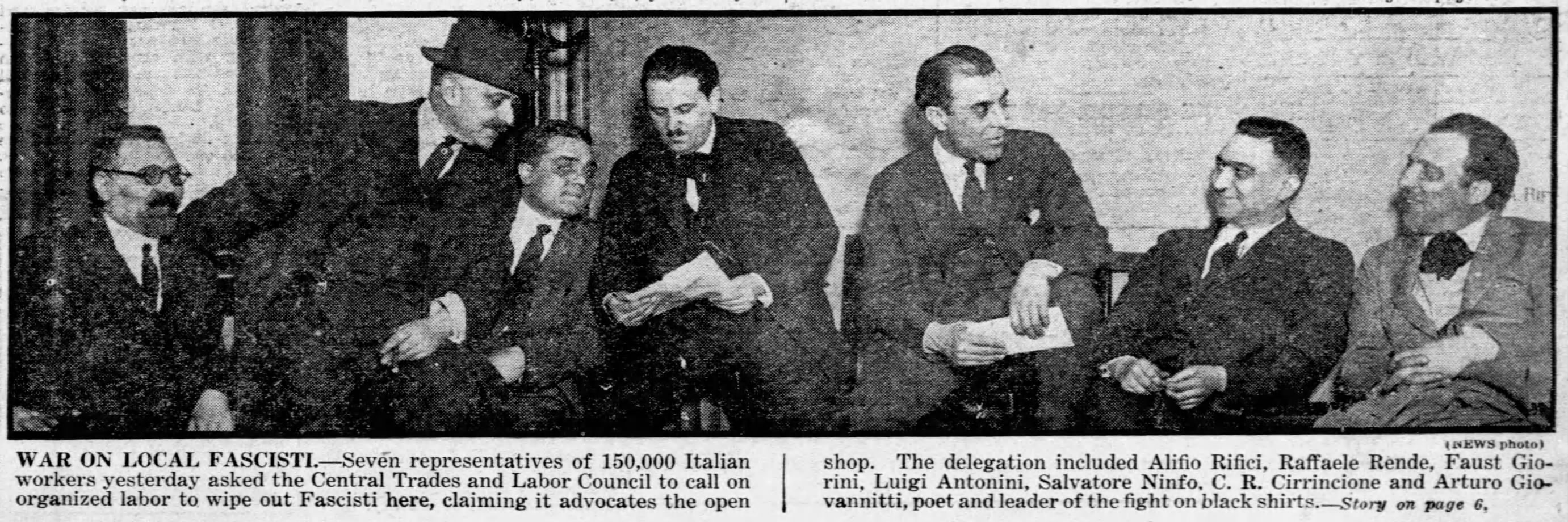
Antonini (center) alongside Salvatore Ninfo, Arturo Giovannitti, and other anti-fascist Italian labor leaders, 1923

In 1919, Italian workers formed an autonomous section within the ILGWU, which was given the name of "Local 89" (the number 89 was a reference to the year of the French Revolution). The weight of "Local 89", with its 25,000 members out of a total of 45,000 members of the ILGWU, became so significant that Antonini was appointed vice-president in 1925 (and from 1934 First Vice President) of the ILGWU itself, a position he held for the next 34 years until 1968.

Antonini increasingly became a spokesman for the entire Italian-American community on issues that went beyond union demands, addressing broader political issues. La Voce della Locale 89, a radio program of music and politics hosted by Antonini himself since 1934, allowed him to reach the general public and gave him wide popularity. It also became the pulpit from which Antonini attacked fascism and fought for racial tolerance, even if this put him at odds with large sectors of the Italian-American community itself. Antonini was a supporter of Democratic President Franklin D. Roosevelt but in New York he supported the election of Republican mayor Fiorello La Guardia, also an Italian-American, against the local Democratic establishment, controlled by Generoso Pope who was in favor of the Mussolini regime.

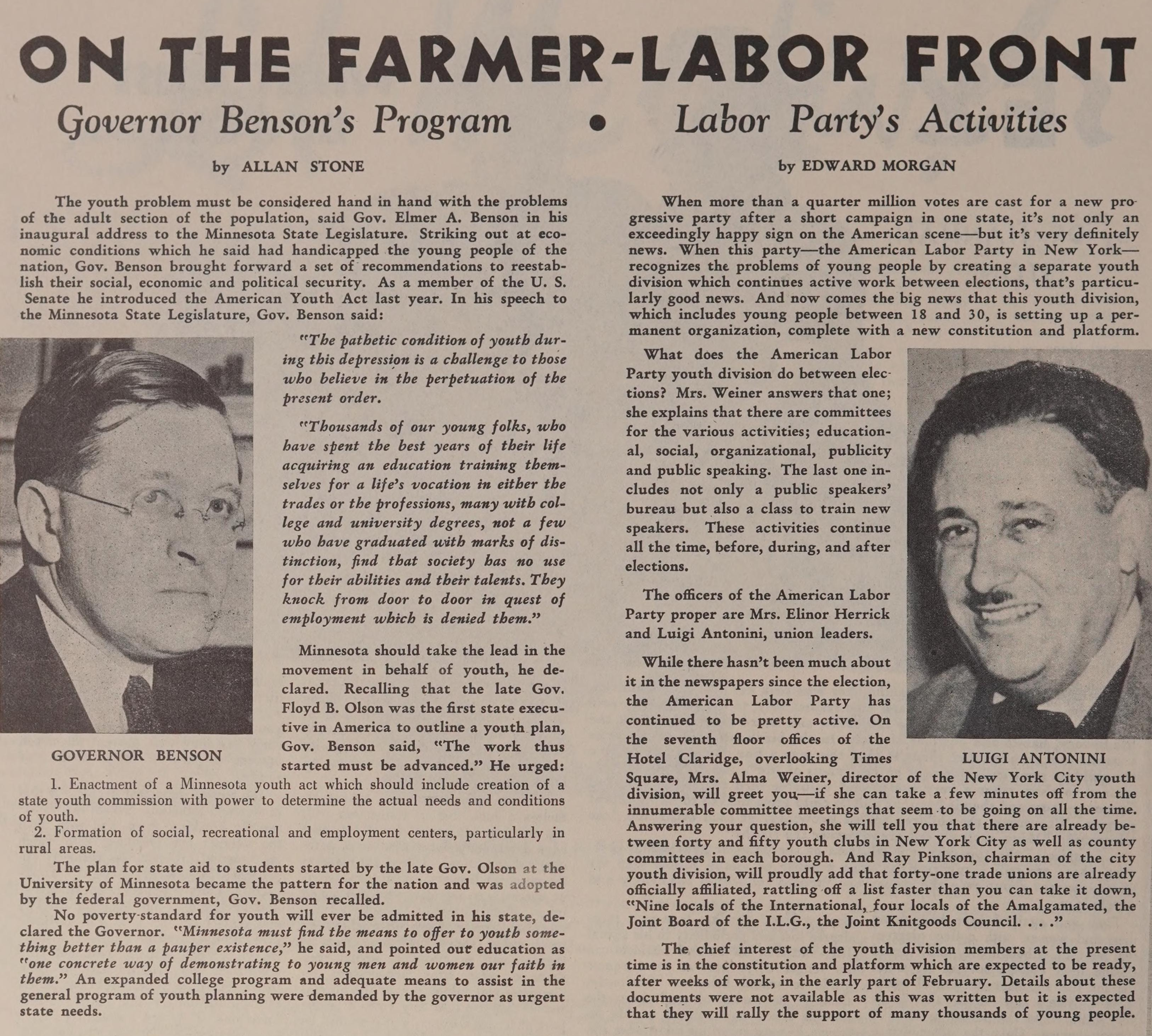
"On The Farmer-Labor Front," an article for the Champion of Youth detailing the activities of Antonini and Elmer A. Benson, published February 1937

In 1936 Antonini was one of the founders of the American Labor Party (ALP), and was elected secretary of the party in the State of New York. He distanced himself from it, however, when in his opinion it assumed too maximalist positions; he then founded with other union leaders the influential Liberal Party of New York. Local 89, however, always remained at the center of his activity, reaching 35,000 members in 1940.

Antonini's international fame also grew in those years. In 1935, he was called to represent the American labor movement in Brussels, Belgium. In 1939, he participated in the Pan-American Congress for Democracy in Montevideo, Uruguay.

=== World War II ===
During World War II, Antonini was resolute in his support of the United States war effort and firm in his condemnation of fascism. In December 1941, a few days after the attack on Pearl Harbor, he was the principal founder of the "Italia-American Labor Council" (IALC), which under his presidency, with over 300,000 registered workers, worked to help America win the war and the Italian people regain their freedom from fascist dictatorship. As early as January 31, 1942, he organized the "Freedom Rally" at Madison Square Garden, attended by over 2,000 people, to demonstrate the loyalty of Italian-Americans to the American cause. The IALC also helped Italian-Americans not to suffer total social marginalization due to the belligerence between the two nations. Thanks to his activism, at least six hundred thousand Italian-Americans were exempted from internment camps and from being expelled from their jobs and residences. The IALC itself financed anti-fascist resistance movements and paid the expenses to support the numerous anti-fascist refugees from Italy.

Attentive to political issues, and having become a member of the Anglo-American Trade Union Committee, Antonini gave life in 1943 to the "Four Freedom Award", created to honour meritorious services rendered to the cause of freedom in the world, awarding the important recognition to Roosevelt, Truman and Supreme Court Justice Francis Biddle (the first recipient of this award).

=== After World War II ===
Already in 1944 Antonini was chosen by the American Federation of Labor (AFL) to go to liberated Italy as a member of the Anglo-American trade union committee to assist Italian workers in the reconstruction of free trade union associations.

Antonini gave concrete help to his fellow countrymen in Italy during the very difficult years of the Second World War. Called to plead the Italian cause, he participated in the Paris Peace Conference of 1947, fighting for fair treatment in the post-war conditions. Antonini also supported the cause of war orphans and contributed with his support to the birth and growth of the Roosevelt Institute, a school for orphans established in Palermo in honor of the late American president.

His collection and sending to Italy of money, medicines, food, clothes and other basic necessities and comforts earned him the respect of numerous Italian political figures, from Presidents De Nicola, Einaudi and Gronchi to Prime Ministers De Gasperi, Scelba and Segni.

The 1950s saw the Avellino native engaged as a delegate of the American Federation of Labor (of which he had become president) at the Milan Conference of 1951. In 1956 he led a delegation of union representatives in Italy and Israel. It was on that occasion that the Haifa stadium took his name in honor of his battles for workers' rights.

Decorated by the Italian Republic with the Star of Solidarity, second and first class, awarded the title of Commander and Grand Officer of the Republic, Antonini also earned a gold medal from the city of Trieste, the title of Knight and Grand Officer of the Republic of San Marino and a gold medal from the Sicilian Region, in addition to obtaining honorary citizenship of Molinella. In 1963, on the occasion of his eightieth birthday, the leading figure of the labor movement was given the keys to the city of New York and for that day Seventh Avenue changed its name to Luigi Antonini Avenue.

Antonini remained active in the union until his death in 1968.

=== Works ===
- Dynamic democracy (New York, 1947)
- Thirtieth anniversary italian dressmakers' union local 89, ILGWU (New York, 1949)
- The Word of the People: Fiftieth Anniversary, 1908-1958 (Chicago, 1959)

== See also ==
- Labor history of the United States
