= Morris Sigman =

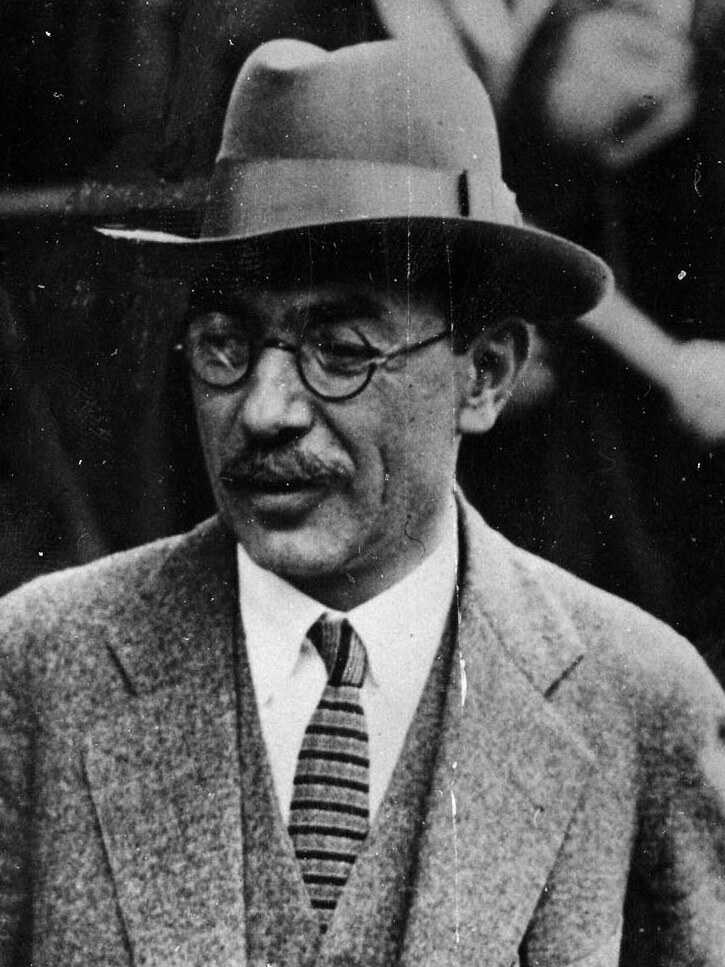
Morris Sigman

Morris Sigman (1881–1931) was president of the International Ladies' Garment Workers' Union from 1923 to 1928.

== Biography ==
=== Early life ===
Born in Akkerman (then in Bessarabia Province of the Russian Empire), Morris Sigman spent his youth working as a lumberjack before moving to London in 1902. In 1903, Sigman emigrated to New York City and began work as a presser in the cloak industry. He organized the Independent Cloak and Skirt Pressers' Union (1904) and allied it with the Socialist Trade and Labor Alliance. In 1905, the Independent Cloak and Skirt Pressers' Union was one of the founding unions of the Industrial Workers of the World (IWW), but by 1908, the union had left the IWW and joined the ILGWU.

=== Work with the ILGWU ===
Shortly after joining the ILGWU, Morris Sigman began to hold local and national roles within the union. Sigman had been heavily involved in the garment workers' strikes of 1910, and was later arrested for murder in what became known as the "Trial of Seven Cloakmakers." With Morris Hillquit as their defense attorney, he and other cloakmakers were found not guilty in 1915. Sigman served as the manager of Local 35 New York Cloak Pressers Union (1913), and then general manager of the Joint Board of Cloakmakers in New York City (1917–1921). At the international level, Sigman was a vice president of the ILGWU (1910–1913), before becoming Secretary-Treasurer (1914–1915) and first vice president (1920–1923). He was elected president of the ILGWU in 1923.

In 1923, the ILGWU president Benjamin Schlesinger resigned and the convention elected Morris Sigman, who had served as the Secretary Treasurer of the ILGWU. Sigman had served as Secretary Treasurer before resigning after a dispute with Schlesinger. As a former IWW member and anti-communist, Sigman immediately began to remove Communist Party members from leadership positions in prominent cities such as Chicago, Philadelphia, New York City, and Boston. Consequently, Sigman was unable to regain control of the New York locals, including Dressmakers’ Local 22, where the Communist Party membership support prevailed.. As a result, the left wing allies, which included many anarchists, and socialists rallied to prevent the ILGWU from physically retaking their union hall. Sigman then proposed an agreement that he later negotiated with the industry in 1925, but the defiant unions led a campaign to reject the proposal. This union-led campaign resulted in more than 30,000 union members gathering at Yankee Stadium to call for a single day work stoppage on August 10, 1925. As the union leadership battled internally, the manufacturers hired gangsters to break the long 1926 general strike on the part of a New York local led by Communist Party members. This ended negotiations with the employers and kept the strike going another four months, at the end of which the union was nearly bankrupt and the left-wing leadership almost fully discredited. Morris Sigman took over negotiations, settled the strike and then proceeded to prevent the Communist Party from obtaining any positions of influence within the ILGWU.

Morris Sigman then called for a truce in the internal dispute with the rallied left-wing members. The agreement followed up with a reform of the ILGWU's internal governance system, which gave proportional influence to locals based on the sizes of their memberships, despite the left wing of the union growing increasingly stronger. With the election at the 1925 convention, Sigman increasingly relied on the support of David Duninsky's cutters union, Italian locals, and many ‘out-of-town’ locals’ to hold on to his presidency. He declared that elections by the membership at this time would be undesirable, although he stated in reply to a question that he had favored the idea in principle at the Philadelphia convention. "What the workers of New York want," Sigman claimed, "is bread, not referenda. What they want are jobs, not referenda." Sigman also attributed the decreasing union standards in New York to not be from ILGWU officials, but instead a result of general industrial depression complicated by Communists. In addition, Sigman alleged that it was the duty of the New York Joint Board, which his opponents control, to improve conditions, secure the jobs for workers and protect union standards. Sigman announced his intention to be a candidate for re-election, marking the first time in his association with the ILGWU that he had done so. His efforts proved inadequate as the failed 1926 strike had nearly bankrupted the ILGWU, and consequently the International also lost a proportion of the locals that had decided to follow their expelled leaders out of the ILGWU rather than stay within the union. Morris Sigman's preference toward the right-wing within the ILGWU led David Dubinsky to suggest in 1928 that the union bring back Benjamin Schlesinger. In response, Morris Sigman did not support the proposal, but acceded to it and resigned in a dispute with the union's executive board. Benjamin Schlesinger later replaced Morris Sigman and David Dubinsky was named Secretary-Treasurer. Following Schlesinger's death in 1932, Dubinsky succeeded in gaining the presidency. Dubinsky later became the longest serving president of the ILGWU (1932-1966). Dubinsky had previously been a supportive advocate in Sigman's efforts to keep the Communist Party influence out of the union's leadership.

=== Legacy ===
Sigman's tenure as president of the ILGWU was a tempestuous one in which the union faced a long and bitter internal struggle with Communist members for control of the organization. A lengthy strike of New York Cloakmakers in 1926 proved to be another costly battle for the union during this period. But Sigman's term was also marked by some significant accomplishments, including a reform effort that made possible substantial union contributions to the restructuring of the garment industry.

== Sources ==
Biography of Morris Sigman

https://www.jta.org/1928/05/16/archive/sigman-group-victorious-on-question-of-election-by-national-referendum https://www.ilr.cornell.edu/ILGWU/presidents/MorrisSigman.html http://womenshistory.about.com/od/worklaborunions/a/ilgwu.htm

Trade union offices
| Preceded by John Alexander Dyche | Secretary-Treasurer of the International Ladies' Garment Workers' Union; 1914–1915 | Succeeded by Abraham Baroff |
| Preceded by Salvatore Ninfo | President of the International Ladies' Garment Workers' Union; 1923–1928 | Succeeded by Benjamin Schlesinger |
