= International Ladies Garment Workers Union =

20th-century American labor union

International Ladies' Garment Workers' Union

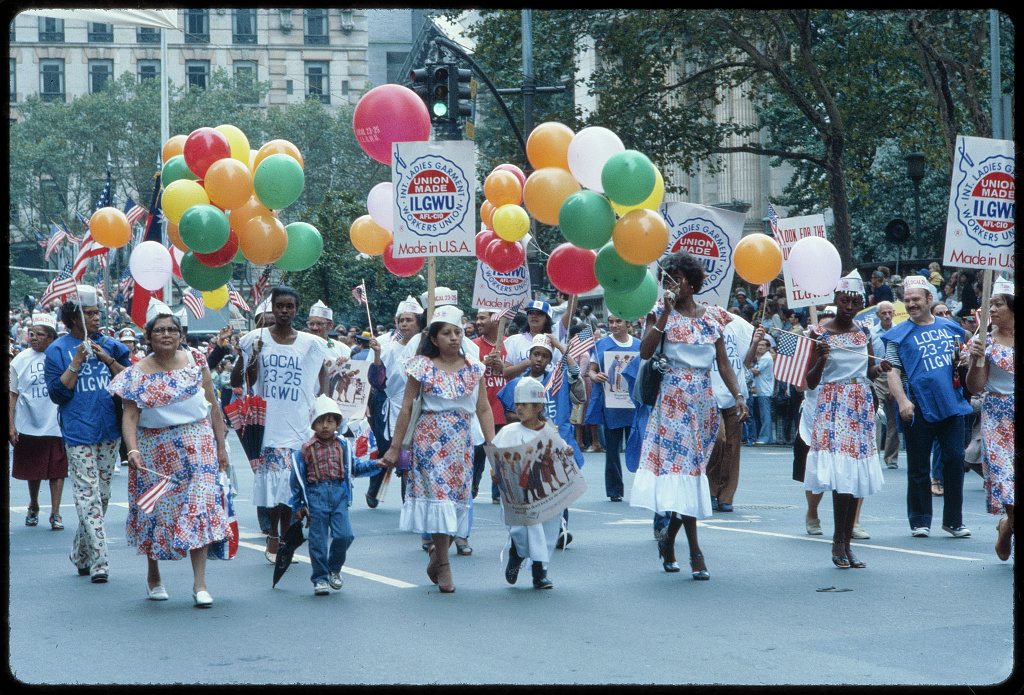
- 1981 New York City Labor Day Parade
- Abbreviation: ILGWU
- Merged into: Union of Needletrades, Industrial and Textile Employees
- Formation: June 3, 1900
- Dissolved: 1995
- Type: Trade union
- Locations: Canada; United States
- Members: 450,000 (1969); 250,000 (1995)
- Affiliations: American Federation of Labor (until 1955); AFL–CIO (from 1955); Canadian Labour Congress

The International Ladies' Garment Workers' Union (ILGWU) was a labor union for employees in the women's clothing industry in the United States. It was one of the largest unions in the country, one of the first to have a primarily female membership, and a key player in the labor history of the 1920s and 1930s. The union, generally referred to as the "ILGWU" or the "ILG", merged with the Amalgamated Clothing and Textile Workers Union in the 1990s to form the Union of Needletrades, Industrial and Textile Employees (UNITE). UNITE merged with the Hotel Employees and Restaurant Employees Union (HERE) in 2004 to become UNITE HERE. The two unions that formed UNITE in 1995 represented 250,000 workers between them, down from the ILGWU's peak membership of 450,000 in 1969.

The union published its official newspaper, Justice, in Jersey City, New Jersey.

== Early history ==
The ILGWU was founded on June 3, 1900, in New York City by seven local unions, with a few thousand members between them. The union grew rapidly in the next few years but began to stagnate as the conservative leadership favored the interests of skilled workers, such as cutters. This did not sit well with the majority of immigrant workers, particularly Jewish workers with a background in Bundist activities in Tsarist Russia, or with Polish and Italian workers, many of whom had strong socialist and anarchist leanings.

== The Uprising of 20,000 and the Great Revolt ==
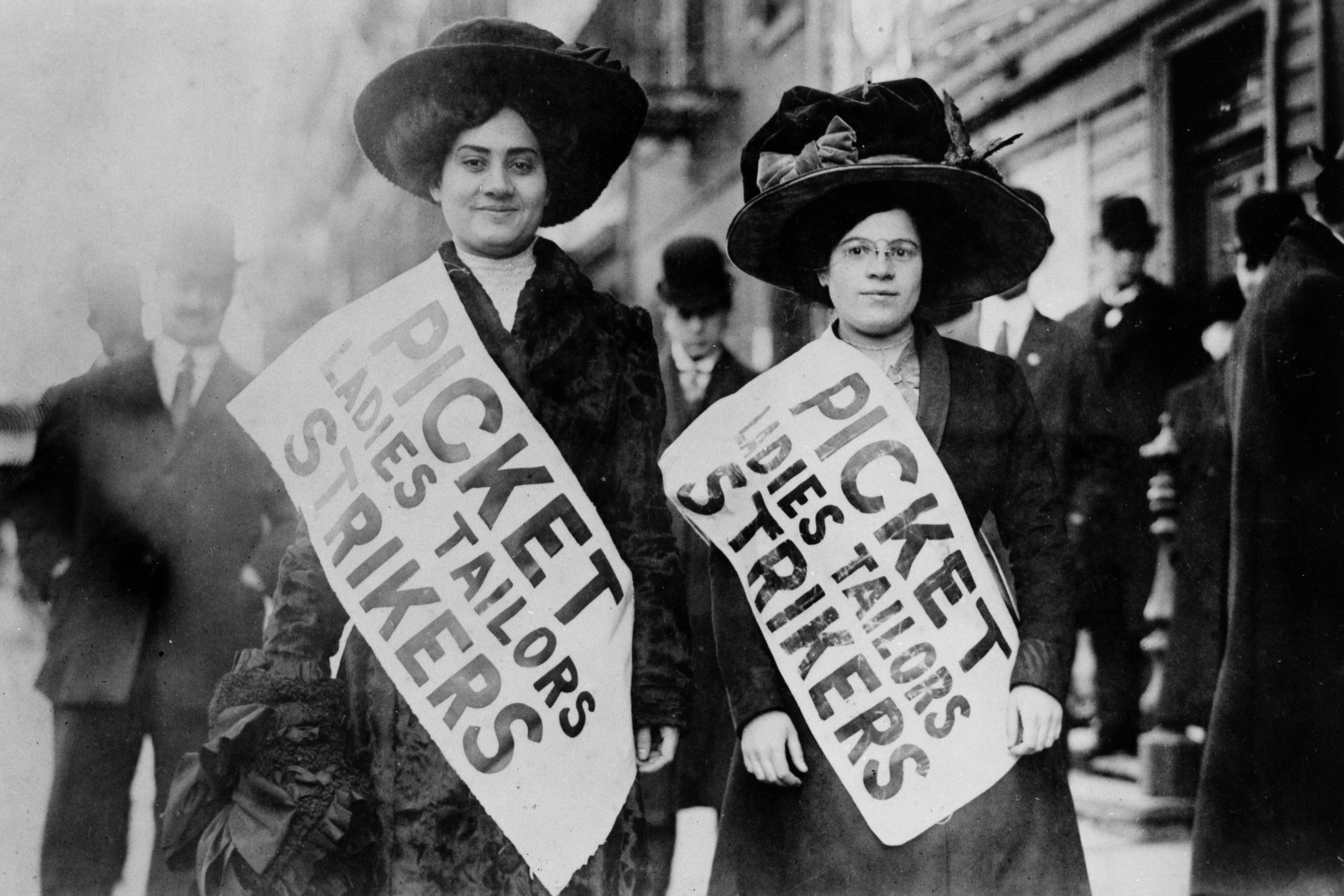
Two women strikers on picket line during the "Uprising of the 20,000", garment workers strike, New York City

The ILGWU had a sudden upsurge in membership that came as the result of two successful mass strikes in New York City.

The first, in 1909, was known as the "Uprising of 20,000" and lasted for thirteen weeks. It was largely spontaneous, sparked by a short walkout of workers of the Triangle Shirtwaist Factory involving only about 20% of the workforce. That, however, prompted the rest of the workers to seek help from the union. The firm locked out its employees when it learned what was happening.

The news of the strike spread quickly among New York garment workers. At a series of mass meetings, after the leading figures of the American labor movement spoke in general terms about the need for solidarity and preparedness, Clara Lemlich rose to speak about the conditions she and other women worked under and demanded an end to talk and the calling of a strike of the entire industry. The crowd responded enthusiastically and, after taking a biblical oath in Yiddish, "If I turn traitor to the cause I now pledge, may this hand wither from the arm I now raise", voted for a general strike. Approximately 20,000 out of the 32,000 workers in the shirtwaist trade walked out in the next two days.

Those workers—who were primarily women and immigrants—defied the preconceptions of many conservative labor leaders, who thought that immigrants and women in general could not be organized. Their slogan, "We'd rather starve quick than starve slow", summed up the depth of their bitterness regarding the sweatshops in which they labored.

The strike was a violent one. Police routinely arrested picketers for trivial or imaginary offenses, while employers hired local thugs to beat them as police looked the other way.

A group of wealthy women, among them Frances Perkins, Anne Morgan, and Alva Vanderbilt Belmont, supported the struggles of working class women with money and intervention with officials and often picketed with them. Newspapers dubbed them "the mink brigade" because they used their wealth and privilege to try to protect the strikers. The strikers did not always welcome their help; Emma Goldman told the press that, "If the strike is won, it will be on its merits, not because it was assisted by wealthy ladies."

The strike was only partially successful. The ILGWU accepted an arbitrated settlement in February 1910 that improved the workers' wages, working conditions, and hours, but the settlement did not provide union recognition. A number of companies, including the Triangle Shirtwaist Factory, refused to sign the agreement. Even so, the strike won a number of important gains. It encouraged workers in the industry to take action to improve their conditions and brought public attention to the sweatshop conditions. With some 20,000 shirtwaist workers as new members, Local 25 became the largest local affiliate of the ILGWU.

Several months later, in 1910, the ILGWU led an even larger strike, later named "The Great Revolt", of 60,000 cloakmakers. After months of picketing, prominent members of the Jewish community, led by Louis Brandeis, mediated between the ILGWU and the Manufacturers' Association. The employers won a promise that workers would settle their grievances through arbitration rather than strikes during the term of the agreement (a common clause in union contracts today). It did also manage to include provisions for the establishment of the Joint Board of Sanitary Control, Committee on Grievances, and a Board of Arbitration.

== The Triangle Shirtwaist Factory fire and its aftermath ==
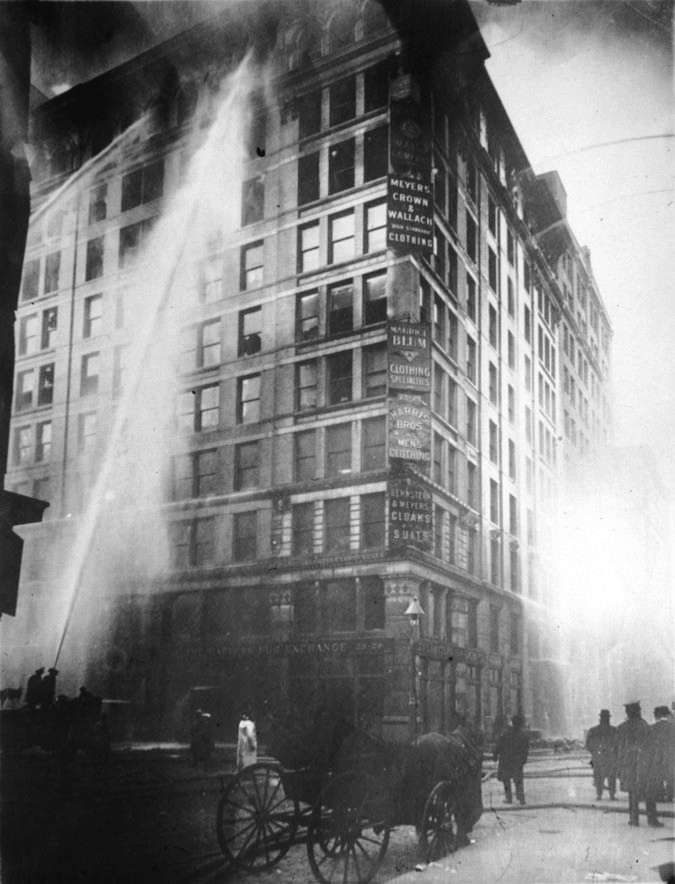
Firefighters spraying water at the Triangle Shirtwaist Factory Building during the fire

The union also became more involved in electoral politics, in part as a result of the Triangle Shirtwaist Factory fire on March 25, 1911, in which 146 shirtwaist makers (most of them young immigrant women) either died in the fire that broke out on the eighth floor of the factory, or jumped to their deaths. Many of these workers were unable to escape because the doors on their floors had been locked to prevent them from stealing or taking unauthorized breaks. More than 100,000 people participated in the funeral march for the victims.

The fire had differing effects on the community. For some it radicalized them still further; as Rose Schneiderman said in her speech at the memorial meeting held in the Metropolitan Opera House on April 2, 1911, to an audience largely made up of the well-heeled members of the Women's Trade Union League (WTUL):

I would be a traitor to these poor burned bodies if I came here to talk good fellowship. We have tried you good people of the public and we have found you wanting. The old Inquisition had its rack and its thumbscrews and its instruments of torture with iron teeth. We know what these things are today; the iron teeth are our necessities, the thumbscrews are the high-powered and swift machinery close to which we must work, and the rack is here in the firetrap structures that will destroy us the minute they catch on fire.

This is not the first time girls have been burned alive in the city. Every week I must learn of the untimely death of one of my sister workers. Every year thousands of us are maimed. The life of men and women is so cheap and property is so sacred. There are so many of us for one job it matters little if 146 of us are burned to death.

We have tried you citizens; we are trying you now, and you have a couple of dollars for the sorrowing mothers, brothers and sisters by way of a charity gift. But every time the workers come out in the only way they know to protest against conditions which are unbearable the strong hand of the law is allowed to press down heavily upon us.

Public officials have only words of warning to us – warning that we must be intensely peaceable, and they have the workhouse just back of all their warnings. The strong hand of the law beats us back, when we rise, into the conditions that make life unbearable.

I can't talk fellowship to you who are gathered here. Too much blood has been spilled. I know from my experience it is up to the working people to save themselves. The only way they can save themselves is by a strong working-class movement.

Others in the union drew a different lesson from events: working with local Tammany Hall officials, such as Al Smith and Robert F. Wagner, and progressive reformers, such as Frances Perkins, they pushed for comprehensive safety and workers' compensation laws. The ILG leadership formed bonds with those reformers and politicians that would continue for another forty years, through the New Deal and beyond.

== Growth and turmoil ==
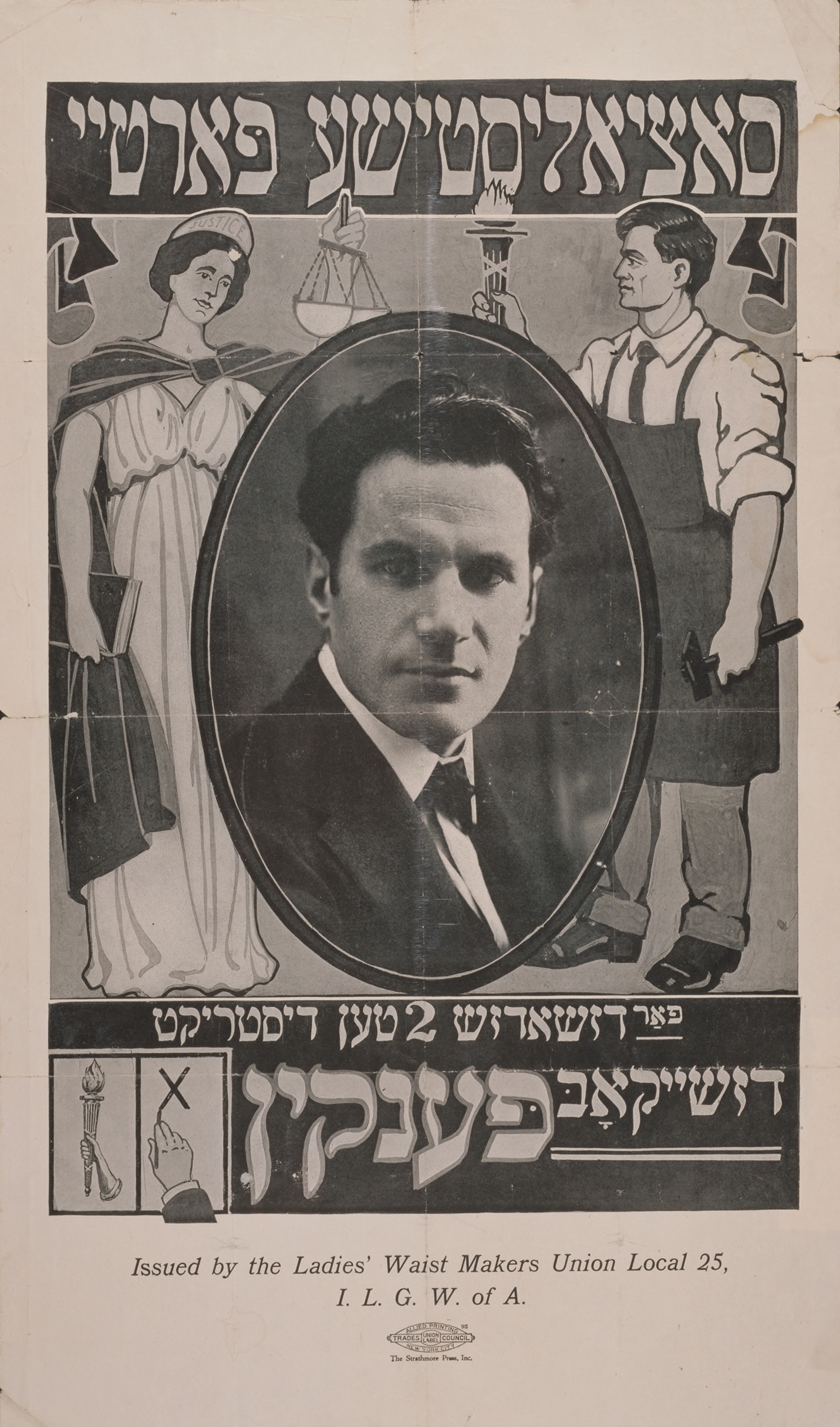
Socialist Party campaign poster, issued by the ILGWA, featuring Jacob Panken as a candidate for Judge of the New York City Municipal Court in the 2nd District, 1917

The ILGWU was able to turn the partial victory of the Great Revolt into a lasting victory; within two years it had organized roughly ninety percent of the cloakmakers in the industry in New York City. It improved benefits in later contracts and obtained an unemployment insurance fund for its members in 1919.

At the same time political splits within the union were beginning to grow larger. The Socialist Party split in 1919, with its left wing leaving to form various communist parties that ultimately united under the name of the Communist Party USA. Those left wing socialists, joined by others with an IWW or anarchist background, challenged the undemocratic structure of the ILGWU, which gave every local an equal vote in electing its leaders, regardless of the number of workers that local represented, and the accommodations that the ILGWU leadership had made in bargaining with the employers. Left wing activists, drawing inspiration from the shop stewards movement that had swept through British labor in the preceding decade, started building up their strength at the shop floor level.

The Communist Party did not intervene in ILGWU politics in any concerted fashion for the first few years of its existence, when it was focused first on its belief that revolution in the advanced capitalist countries was imminent, followed by a period of underground activity. That changed, however, around 1921, as the party attempted to create a base for itself in the working class and, in particular, in the unions within the AFL.

The party had its greatest success and failure in that effort in the 1920s in the garment trades, where workers had experience with mass strikes and socialist politics were part of the common discourse. Party members had won elections in some of the most important locals within the ILGWU, particularly in New York City, in the early years of the decade and hoped to expand their influence.

In the late 1920s, the ILGWU began focusing on recruiting African-American women, specifically. Floria Pinkney, a dressmaker from Connecticut who lived in Brooklyn, was instrumental in this focus. Pinkney spoke alongside Brotherhood of Sleeping Car Porters president A. Philip Randolph at a 1929 ILGWU meeting in Harlem focused on enrolling black women.

== Internal battles ==
In 1923, Benjamin Schlesinger, the International's President, resigned. The convention elected Morris Sigman, who had previously been Secretary-Treasurer of the International before resigning in a dispute with Schlesinger, as its new President. Sigman, a former IWW member and anti-communist, began to remove Communist Party (CP) members from leadership of locals in New York, Chicago, Philadelphia and Boston.

Sigman could not regain control of the New York locals, including Dressmakers' Local 22, headed by Charles S. Zimmerman, where the CP leadership and their left-wing allies, some anarchists and some socialists, enjoyed strong support of the membership. Local 22 rallied to prevent the International from physically retaking their union hall. Those unions led the campaign to reject a proposed agreement that Sigman had negotiated with the industry in 1925, bringing more than 30,000 members to a rally at Yankee Stadium to call for a one-day stoppage on August 10, 1925.

After Sigman called a truce in the internecine war with the left-led locals, followed up by a reform of the ILGWU's internal governance system that gave proportional weight to locals based on the size of their membership, the left wing of the union was even stronger than before. Sigman depended on the support of David Dubinsky's cutters union, many of the Italian locals, and the "out-of-town locals", many of which were mere paper organizations, to retain his presidency at the 1925 convention.

The showdown came the next year. The International supported the recommendations of an advisory board appointed by Governor Al Smith that supported the union's demands that wholesale jobbers be financially responsible for the wages owed by their contractors and that workers be guaranteed a set number of hours per year, while allowing employers to reduce their workforces by up to 10% in any given year. While Sigman and Dubinsky supported the proposal, the CP-led and CP-influenced locals denounced it. The New York Joint Board called a general strike on July 1, 1926.

The left-wing locals may have hoped that a general strike, which had the support of the right-wing locals loyal to Sigman, would be a quick success; it was not. Employers hired "Legs" Diamond and other gangsters to beat up strikers. The union hired their own protection, led by "Little Augie" Orgen, to retaliate. When the strike entered its third month, the left wing leadership went to A.E. Rothstein, a retired manufacturer, to ask him to intercede. He suggested they talk to his estranged son, Arnold Rothstein, a gambler with widespread influence in the New York underworld.

Rothstein was able to get the hired gangsters on both sides to withdraw. The local leadership was then able to negotiate a modified version of the agreement they had rejected before the strike began. While they had reservations about the concessions they were accepting, the left wing recommended it.

Factional divisions within the CPUSA led the party leadership to reject the offer. As one member of the CPUSA and a leader in Local 22 recalled the scene, one of the members of the committee said, when presenting the agreement to a meeting of the shop floor leaders, "Maybe we could have gotten more, but ...", at which point a party leader interjected, "They didn't get more. If there is a possibility of getting more, go and get more." The rest of the leadership, unwilling to appear less militant, joined in urging rejection of the deal. That ended negotiations with the employers and kept the strike going another four months, at the end of which the union was nearly bankrupt and the left leadership almost wholly discredited. Sigman took over negotiations, settled the strike and then proceeded to drive the Communist Party from any positions of influence within the ILG.

== Dubinsky's rise to power ==
The failed 1926 strike nearly bankrupted the ILGWU. The International also lost, for a time, some of the locals that chose to follow their expelled leaders out of the ILGWU rather than remain within it. Sigman also proved nearly as abrasive, although not as fierce, toward the right wing within the ILGWU, leading Dubinsky to suggest in 1928 that the union should bring back Schlesinger, who had gone on to become General Manager of the Forward, the highly influential Yiddish newspaper in New York, as Executive Vice-President of the union.

Sigman did not like the proposal, but acceded to it. Five months later he resigned in a dispute with the union's executive board and Schlesinger replaced him, with Dubinsky named as Secretary-Treasurer. Schlesinger died in 1932 and Dubinsky, still Secretary-Treasurer, became President of the ILGWU as well.

Dubinsky proved to be far more durable than his predecessors. He did not tolerate dissent within the union, and insisted that every employee of the International first submit an undated letter of resignation, to be used should Dubinsky choose to fire him later. He also acquired the power to appoint key officers throughout the union. As he explained his position at one of the union's conventions: "We have a democratic union – but they know who's boss."

Under his leadership the union, more than three fourths of whose members were women, continued to be led almost exclusively by men. Rose Pesotta, a longtime ILGWU activist and organizer, complained to Dubinsky that she had the same uncomfortable feeling of being the token woman on the ILGWU's executive board that Dubinsky had complained about when he was the only Jew on the AFL's board. The union did not make any significant efforts to allow women into leadership positions during Dubinsky's tenure.

== The Great Depression and the CIO ==
As weak as the ILGWU was in the aftermath of the 1926 strike, it was nearly destroyed by the Great Depression. Its dues-paying membership slipped to 25,000 in 1932 as unionized garment shops shut or went nonunion or stopped abiding by their union contracts.

The union recovered after the election of Franklin Delano Roosevelt and the passage of the National Industrial Recovery Act, which promised to protect workers' right to organize. As in the case in other industries with a history of organizing, that promise alone was enough to bring thousands of workers who had never been union members in the past to the union. When the union called a strike of dressmakers in New York on August 16, 1933, more than 70,000 workers joined in it – twice the number that the union had hoped for. It did not hurt that the local leader of the National Recovery Administration was quoted as saying – without any basis in fact – that President Roosevelt had authorized the strike. The union rebounded to more than 200,000 members by 1934, increasing to roughly 300,000 by the end of the Depression.

At the same time in Los Angeles, Rose Pesotta was organizing women dressmakers, primarily from the Latina community, to create a union and demand better pay and working conditions. After a strike and resistance from the Merchand and Manufacturers Association, workers received some improved pay, but not all of their conditions were met.

As one of the few industrial unions within the AFL, the ILGWU was eager to advance the cause of organizing employees in the steel, automobile and other mass production industries that employed millions of low-wage workers, many of them immigrants or children of immigrants. The ILGWU was one of the original members of the Committee for Industrial Organization, the group that John L. Lewis of the United Mine Workers formed within the AFL in 1935 to organize industrial workers, and provided key financial support and assistance. The organizing momentum gained over the Depression would carry over into the new decade. By the end of the 1940s, the ILGWU had added roughly 70,000 new members and expanded out of its traditional enclaves of New York, Philadelphia, and Chicago. During this drive the ILGWU chased down and organized manufacturers' "runaway shops" and established a strong foothold in the hinterlands of the Midwest and East Coast. Rose Pesotta played a key role in early organizing drives in the rubber and steel industries.

Dubinsky was unwilling to split the AFL into two competing federations and did not follow Lewis and the Amalgamated Clothing Workers when they formed the Congress of Industrial Organizations as a rival to, rather than a part of, the AFL. Dubinsky also had personality differences with Lewis, whom he resented as high-handed.

Dubinsky was alarmed by the presence of Communist Party members on the payroll of the CIO and the fledgling unions it had sponsored. Dubinsky was opposed to any form of collaboration with communists and had offered financial support to Homer Martin, the controversial president of the United Auto Workers, who was being advised by Jay Lovestone, a former leader of the Communist Party turned anti-communist, in his campaign to drive his opponents out of the union. Lewis was unconcerned with the number of communists working for the CIO. He told Dubinsky, when asked about the communists on the staff of the Steel Workers Organizing Committee, "Who gets the bird? The hunter or the dog?"

The ILGWU began reducing its support for the CIO and, after a few years in which it attempted to be allies with both sides, reaffiliated with the AFL in 1940. Dubinsky regained his former positions as a vice president and member of the executive council of the AFL in 1945. He was the most visible supporter within the AFL of demands to clean house by ousting corrupt union leaders. The AFL–CIO ultimately adopted many of his demands when it established codes of conduct for its affiliates in 1957.

== Electoral politics ==
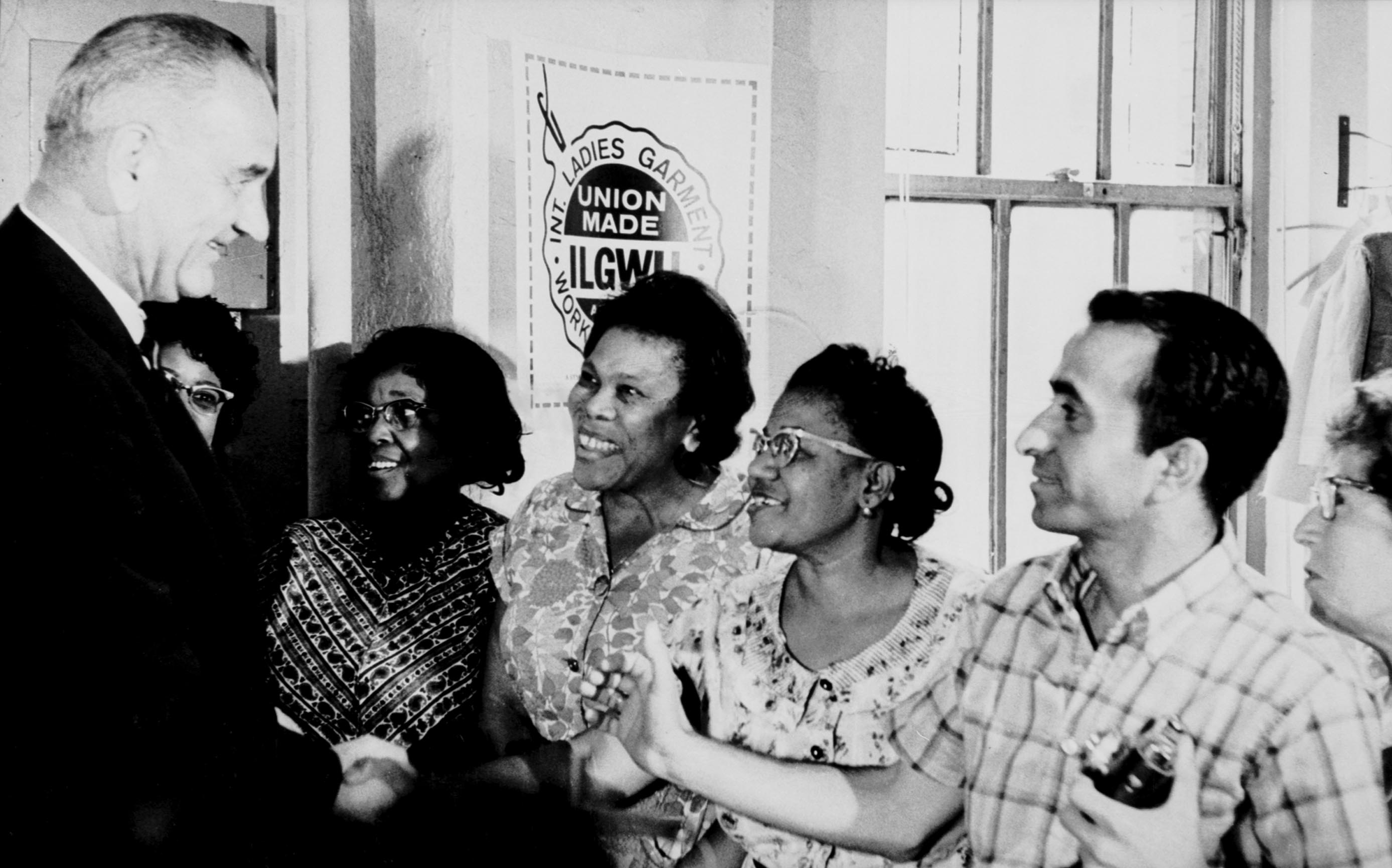
Lyndon Johnson meets with ILGWU members.

Dubinsky and Sidney Hillman, leader of the Amalgamated Clothing Workers, helped found the American Labor Party in 1936. At the time Dubinsky and Hillman were both nominal members of the Socialist Party, although Dubinsky had, by his own admission, allowed his membership to lapse during the factional fighting of the 1920s. The Labor Party served as a halfway house for socialists and other leftists who were willing to vote for liberal Democratic politicians such as Roosevelt or Governor Herbert Lehman of New York, but who were not prepared to join the Democratic Party itself.

The new party was subject to many of the same fissures that divided the left in the late 1930s. For a while after the signing of the Molotov–Ribbentrop Pact, CPUSA members within the ALP condemned FDR as a warmonger because of his support for Britain. At one particularly stormy meeting Dubinsky and the other leaders were only able to hold their vote endorsing Roosevelt after moving from room to room and calling the police to arrest those who had disrupted the meeting.

Dubinsky ultimately left the Labor Party in 1944 after a dispute with Hillman over whether labor leaders in New York, such as Mike Quill, who either were members of the Communist Party or were seen as sympathetic to it, should be given any role in the ALP. When Hillman prevailed, Dubinsky and his allies left to form the Liberal Party. The ALP went on to endorse Henry Wallace in the 1948 presidential election, while the ILGWU campaigned energetically for Harry S. Truman, nearly bringing New York State into his column.

Dubinsky had hopes of launching a national liberal party, headed by Wendell Willkie, the Republican candidate for President in 1940 who had soured on the Republican Party after his defeat in the primaries in 1944. In Dubinsky's eyes this new party would attract the internationalists in the Republican Party and the bulk of the Democratic Party, without the white Southern conservative bloc that commanded so much power in Congress. He proposed that Willkie begin by running for Mayor of New York City in 1945; Willkie, however, died before the plan could get off the ground.

Dubinsky and the ILGWU played an active role in the Liberal Party for most of the 1950s and up until his retirement in 1966. The ILGWU ended its support for the party after Dubinsky left office.

== Management experiments ==
The ILGWU established its own industrial engineering office, called the Management Engineering Department, in 1941. This followed two unsuccessful attempts to begin such a program in 1916 and 1919. The 1916 attempt had been suggested by future Supreme Court Justice Louis Brandeis and Morris Hillquit, who invited Taylor Society co-founder R. G. Valentine to set up an experiment to demonstrate the techniques of scientific management. However, Valentine died before the experiment could be carried out. This was followed by a demonstration program carried out in Cleveland from 1919 to 1931 under Morris L. Cooke and Francis P. Goodell.

The ILGWU listed its objectives in setting up the management engineering department as: "1. To assist in improving the manufacturing techniques and operating methods of all branches of the industry with which our workers' earnings are intimately bound ... 2. To serve as a central information agency: (a) To determine the level of 'fair piece rates.' (b) To record the production system and manufacturing techniques, under which these rates are paid. (c) To assist in training shop members and committees in distinguishing bad time study practices and good time study practices in the determination of rates." This emphasis on cooperation between labor and management using the techniques of scientific management in order to improve the workers' conditions and pay came to be known as the "mutual gains strategy" but was largely abandoned in the wake of the Wagner Act.

== Other social and cultural efforts ==
The ILGWU turned its attention to social and cultural matters at an early stage in its history. A resort called "Unity House" was opened in the Pocono Mountains in Forest Park, PA for union workers. An educational department offered courses in union leadership skills, citizenship and the English language, law, and pattern-making. Health centers provided medial care for union members and their families. The Union also sponsored sports teams and musical groups, while union members staged the topical musical Pins and Needles (1937–1940). The ILGWU, following the lead of the Amalgamated Clothing Workers, also developed housing for its members. The ILGWU, for a time, also owned radio stations in New York City (WFDR-FM 104.3, now WAXQ), Los Angeles (KFMV 94.7, now KTWV), and Chattanooga, Tennessee (WVUN 100.7, now WUSY).

Dubinsky was also active in the Jewish Labor Committee, which the ILGWU, along with the Amalgamated Clothing Workers, the Workmen's Circle and other groups, helped establish in 1934 to respond to Hitler's rise to power and to defend the rights of European Jewry. After the war the ILGWU and other groups affiliated with the JLC helped arrange for adoptions of orphaned children who had survived the war. The JLC also played a part in the work of the AFL–CIO's Civil Rights Department.

=== "Look for the Union Label" ===
The first union label signifying the labor was performed by union members was put on products in 1869. The ILGWU's label debuted in 1900. From the 1960s through the 1990s, the ILGWU promoted their label on swag such as totes and keychains in an attempt to draw consumer attention to the labor issue. The "Look for the Union Label" song premiered in 1975 and then continued to appear in advertisements for about a decade. Four versions were recorded. In each commercial, one or two union workers would speak to the camera, followed by a shot of the ILGWU label, then a growing number of union members singing the jingle until a full chorus has joined in. The "jingle achieve[d] both a sonic timelessness and a lyrical directness" that led many to assume it was an older anthem. The lyrics were written by Paula Green and the music by Malcolm Dodds.

"Look for the Union Label" became an anthem for the broader labor movement more broadly. President Jimmy Carter claimed he was uncertain whether he preferred it to "Hail to the Chief," and Al Gore sang it to Teamsters while campaigning for president.

It has been parodied by Saturday Night Live and South Park.

It frequently appears in collections of labor anthems.

== Decline of the union ==
The Garment Worker (1984) by Judith Weller was commissioned by the ILGWU and the Public Art Fund, and donated to the City of New York. It is on permanent display outside 555 Seventh Avenue, between West 39th and 40th Streets in the Garment District of Midtown Manhattan. It portrays a garment worker at a sewing machine and is intended as a reminder of the role of the ILGWU's members in making New York one of the garment and fashion centers of the world.

The union often saw itself, both before and during Dubinsky's years at the head of the union, as the savior of the industry, eliminating the cutthroat competition over wages that had made it unstable while making workers miserable. Dubinsky took pride in negotiating a contract in 1929 that contained no raises, but allowed the union to crack down on subcontractors who "chiseled". Dubinsky even claimed to have once turned down an employer's wage offer in negotiations as too costly to the employers, and therefore harmful to employees. Dubinsky summarized his attitude by saying that "workers need capitalism the way a fish needs water."

Policing the industry became much harder, however, as gangsters invaded the garment district. Both the employers and the union had hired gangsters during the strikes of the 1920s. Some of them, such as Louis "Lepke" Buchalter, remained in the industry as labor racketeers who took over unions for the opportunities for raking off dues and extorting payoffs from employers with the threat of a strike. Some also became garment manufacturers themselves, driving away unions, other than those they controlled, by violence. While Dubinsky himself remained untouched by graft, a number of officers within the union were corrupted.

The ILGWU was unable, on the other hand, to prevent the flight of formerly unionized shops to other parts of the US or abroad, where unions were nonexistent and wages far lower, though there were exceptions, for example, the successful unionization of runaway shops by organizer Min Matheson in northeastern Pennsylvania in the 1950s. The garment industry is an exceptionally mobile one, requiring little capital, using easily carried equipment, and able to relocate its operations with little or no advance warning. The union lost nearly 300,000 members over twenty years to overseas manufacturing and runaway shops in the south.

In the meantime, the membership of the union changed from being predominantly Jewish and Italian to drawing on the latest wave of immigrant workers: largely from Puerto Rico, the Dominican Republic and China in New York and other east coast cities and from Mexico, Central America, and Asia in Los Angeles and other western and southern centers of the industry. The leadership of the union had less and less in common with its membership and very often had no experience in the trade itself. The union won few gains in workers' wages and benefits in the years after World War II and gradually lost its ability to keep sweatshop conditions from returning, even in the former center of its strength in New York.

In the last decade of Dubinsky's tenure some of these new members began to rebel, protesting their exclusion from positions of power within the union. That rebellion failed: the established leadership had too strong a hold on the official structure of the union, in an industry in which members were scattered across a number of small shops and in which power was concentrated in the upper echelons of the union, rather than in the locals. Without the support of a mass movement that would have given the majority an effective voice, individual insurgents were either marginalized or co-opted.

The union also found it nearly impossible to organize garment workers in communities such as Los Angeles, even when going after established manufacturers such as Guess?. Organizing on a shop by shop basis proved largely futile, given the proliferation of "fly by night" contractors, the number of workers willing to take striking or fired workers' jobs, the uncertain immigration status of many workers and the kinship connections that bound many workers to their foremen and other low-level managers. The union found itself in 1995 in nearly the same position that it had been in more than ninety years earlier, but without any prospect of the sort of mass upsurge that had produced the general strikes of 1909 and 1910.

The ILGWU merged with the Amalgamated Clothing and Textile Workers Union in 1995, to form UNITE. In 2004, that organization merged with the Hotel Employees and Restaurant Employees union to form UNITE HERE.

== Union label ==
The ILGWU adopted an optional union label at its first convention. Labeling was briefly made compulsory in all industries under the National Recovery Act label from 1933 to 1935, after which the ILGWU established its Union Label Office. A campaign in the 1950s to make the union label mandatory culminated in a garment-industry–wide label, launched in 1959 with appearances by Mary Rockefeller, Eleanor Roosevelt and other notable women around the country.

In the 1970s, in response to competition from an increase in imported goods, the union label was redesigned to emphasize American patriotism, adding the words "Made in the U.S.A." (a phrase that was made mandatory in 1985 under the Textile Fiber Products Identification Act). The 1975 "Look For the Label" campaign's eponymous advertising jingle, written by Paula Green and Malcolm Dodds, was a popular, enduring anthem. This "iconic" catchiness comes from its striking similarity to the 1919 Jerome Kern hit song "Look For the Silver Lining". Where earlier campaigns had invoked the Culture of Domesticity to associate union products with family values and traditional gender roles, the 1975 campaign embraced women's liberation, depicting the working, rank-and-file members of the ILGWU.

The commercial featuring the famous song was parodied on a late-1970s episode of Saturday Night Live in a fake commercial for The Dope Growers Union; the March 19, 1977, episode (#10.22) of The Carol Burnett Show; and the South Park episode "Freak Strike" (2002).

== Leadership ==
=== Presidents ===
1900: Herman Grossman
1903: Benjamin Schlesinger
1904: James McCauley
1905: Herman Grossman
1907: Julian Mortimer
1908: Charles Jacobson (acting)
1908: Abraham Rosenberg
1914: Benjamin Schlesinger
1923: Salvatore Ninfo (acting)
1923: Morris Sigman
1928: Benjamin Schlesinger
1932: David Dubinsky
1966: Louis Stulberg
1975: Sol Chaikin
1986: Jay Mazur

=== Secretary-Treasurers ===
1900: Bernard Braff
1904: John Alexander Dyche
1914: Morris Sigman
1915: Abraham Baroff
1929: David Dubinsky
1959: Louis Stulberg
1973: Sol Chick Chaikin
1977: Shelley Appleton
1983: Jay Mazur
1986: Irwin Solomon

== See also ==
- Luigi Antonini
- International Ladies Garment Workers Union leaders
- Women in labor unions
